= The English Disease (album) =

Studio album by Barmy Army
- Released: October 1989
- Studio: Southern Records, The Manor and Matrix Studios, United Kingdom
- Genre: Dub; rock; electronica; funk; reggae; indie dance; collage
- Length: 40:28 (LP); 53:24 (CD)
- Label: On-U Sound
- Producer: Adrian Sherwood

Adrian Sherwood chronology
Very Big in America Right Now (1984)	The English Disease (1989)	Never Trust a Hippy (2003)

Singles from The English Disease
- 1. "Sharp as a Needle" Released: January 1988

The English Disease is the only album by the Barmy Army, a moniker for British producer Adrian Sherwood. Released in October 1989 through the musician's label On-U Sound Records, it features bassist Doug Wimbish and guitarist Skip McDonald from Tackhead, whom Barmy Army are sometimes described as an alias of, and drummer Style Scott among other musicians and contributors.

Described by Steve Barker as a 'sonic documentary', the album is a homage to football, and was recorded amid, and in response to, a period of turmoil for the sport in the United Kingdom, following numerous tragedies in the 1980s, the banning of English clubs in European tournaments and a social paranoia surrounding the game. The record combines electronic rhythms and styles of dub, rock, noise and funk with taped samples and found sound snippets of football commentators, crowds, terrace chants, players and managers, lending the album an anthropological feel. While joyful, the recording also features political undertones, with certain tracks focusing on football-related issues such as crowd safety, commercialisation and ID cards.

One track, the Kenny Dalglish tribute "Sharp as a Needle", was released as a single in January 1988. On release, The English Disease was packaged in a Subbuteo-style sleeve designed by Steve Hardstaff. Music critics drew attention to the album's mixture of dub music and football chants. The record has since been cited as part of the 'footballisation' of pop music from the mid-1980s to the early 1990s, and specifically the rave culture-propelled indie dance crossover of 1989-1990 that saw football's reputation rise in the United Kingdom.

== Background and recording ==
As with Tackhead and Dub Syndicate, Barmy Army are considered to be one of several bands overseen by producer and On-U Sound label head Adrian Sherwood, with bands often sharing personnel. Barmy Army has been referred to both as Sherwood's "football-themed" alter ego, and a pseudonym for Tackhead, who were formed in 1984 by Sherwood and the former Sugarhill Records rhythm section and signed to On-U Sound. The name Barmy Army was a deliberately ironic choice, as the term had been shouted by football fans across English grounds for many years, turning the chant into a 'brand'. The act's only album, The English Disease has been described as a Sherwood album, with typical appearances from bassist Doug Wimbish, guitarist Skip McDonald, drummer Style Scott and others. Danny Kelly describes the personnel as "the usual gang of McDonald, Wimbish and Scott but not LeBlanc". Bortwhick writes that Tackhead, of whom Wimbish and McDonald were also members, contributed to what was ultimately a Sherwood-controlled album. Previously, Tackhead worked with Gary Clail as the On-U Sound System and issued three critically acclaimed records of their own.

The English Disease was recorded at the height of, and served as a response to, the social paranoia around football in the United Kingdom as the game was placed under increasing scrutiny. By the end of the 1980s, football's public reputation in the UK was at its lowest; the era had been tarnished by the Bradford City fire and Heysel Stadium disaster, both in 1985, and the Hillsborough disaster in 1989. Due to violent fans, English football teams were banned from competing in European tournaments, while the British government – according to Dave Thompson – "regarded soccer as a disease, and its supporters less than animals". At the time, football's "sole cheerleaders" appeared to be fanzine editors, whereas politicians and conventional celebrities distanced themselves from the sport. This atmosphere inspired Sherwood in the project. The album's recording sessions were considered overtly lengthy. Part of it was recorded at Matrix Studios with engineers Deptford Dave and Andy Montgomery, while other parts were worked on at Southern and The Manor, Oxfordshire, with engineer Steve 'Barny' Chase.

On-U Sound's first football-themed release, and a precedent for The English Disease, was Tackhead's early 1987 single "The Game", with its samples of ITV football commentator Brian Moore and the message "Where's the Barmy West Ham Army?" etched into the vinyl pressing. This was followed in January 1988 by the first Barmy Army release, the single "Sharp as a Needle", which sampled the traditional Wembley and Anfield Kop anthems, "Abide with Me" and "You'll Never Walk Alone", respectively, over a rhythm originally slated for Mark Stewart and the Maffia. Later featured on the album, the track also features keyboards from Ministry's Al Jourgensen, who recorded their album Twitch (1986) with Sherwood, and bass from Rolo McGinty of the Woodentops.

== Composition ==
A musical homage to football, The English Disease was described by On the Wire presenter Steve Barker as Sherwood responding to the contemporary troubles of English football with "a passionately produced sonic documentary", where supporters of different teams collaborate in "a joyful celebration of the game whilst levelling a number of incisive jibes against the game's establishment, both at club and organisational levels". As described by Steve Redhead, the record mixes recordings of terrace chants and singing, both typically captured inside football grounds using Sony Walkman recorders, with "electronic rhythms and instrumental improvisation", particularly on the Kenny Dalglish tribute track "Sharp as a Needle". According to Thompson, the Barmy Army were "an anarchic electro-punk dance monster" cast firmly within "the mutant rave culture of the age", while The English Disease employs "throbbing rhythms, scything guitars, raucous chants, and sampled crowd and commentary to paint the most dramatic aural portrait possible of the state of the game in the UK at the end of the eighties."

Music author Stuart Bortwhick refers to it as a reggae-influenced album, whereas reviewer Stephen Cook considers its "rock and electronica-dominated mix" to be a departure from the reggae and dub-centric style that characterised Sherwood's earlier productions. Music writer Tom Ewing says it "mixes found commentary and chants into Sherwood's typically mechanical take on dub", while Barker considers the album's tough rhythms to be rooted in reggae and funk. Kelly comments that Sherwood mixes his distinctive "meshes of gnarled noise and fluid funk" with football, calling it "a sweeter, more flowing, less martially percussive version" of the producer's sound. He added that the "mind-jiggling selection" of football sounds include commentators, players, managers and crowds of fans, including supporters of Blackburn Rovers, Stockport County, Leyton Orient, Crewe Alexandra and others. Sounds of the team Sherwood supports, West Ham United F.C., are high in the mixes. Redhead's taped field recordings feature on the record, cut-up in a manner he described as "William Burroughs-like". Cook notes the consistent use of English football references in the track names and "a dizzying and sympathetic array of game-day samples from crowd chants to broadcast-booth snippets".

The individual tracks, which all feature snippets of football commentary, typically focus on one team each. Borthwick wrote that the use of commentary and "the sounds of miscellaneous crowds at English football games" lend the record an anthropological feel. Barker agrees, believing the slant to stem from the use of television and radio samples and terrace chants, comparing them to the ethnic and tribal material sampled on Sherwood's African Head Charge records. Kelly highlighted the album's political edge as being evident in songs like "Mind the Gap" and "Civil Liberty", which address issues that plagued the sport such as "ID cards, crowd safety and commercialisation". Ewing, discussing the record's politically charged samples, highlights "then-beleaguered England manager Bobby Robson" and "the voices of the Kop, of Wimbledon fans, of politicians, of the older school of sports commentator whose style was less banter, more orator."

== Release and reception ==
Professional ratings
Review scores
Source	Rating
AllMusic	4/5 stars
NME	9½/10

The English Disease was released on vinyl in October 1989 by On-U Sound. The name of the album is a parodic reference to 'the English disease', a name given by the media to football following the tragedies at Birmingham, Bradford and Heysel in May 1985. The album sleeve, designed by Steve Hardstaff, is a cartoon depicting hobby horse donkeys playing football. Barker considers the "mutant-subbuteo artwork" to be a departure from earlier On-U Sound sleeves. The record was re-released on 21 July 1998, and later appeared on Bandcamp.

In his review for The Observer, Simon Frith considered Sherwood to be a unique figure in British pop due to him "applying an indie sensibility to the deeper, more avant-garde end of dub and funk production." He adds that, on the album, Sherwood concentrates his quirky approach on "football fervour, sampling crowd noises and terrace songs, managerial banality and politicians' idiocy", making it "necessary listening for Colin Moynihan." Reviewing the album for NME, Kelly repeatedly described Sherwood as a genius and wrote that, although arriving late in his career, The English Disaster was one of the producer's very best ideas for how it combines their extraordinary music and football, the two "most beautiful, precious and important [things] in the world". He applauded the unique political aspects and wrote that, if created by a lesser producer, the album would have been a mess akin to "Jive Bunny in a striped scarf", but Sherwood "understands that human speech, chanting, commentaries, everything, has a rhythm of its own, and he's the complete master of matching rhythms and sounds, making them inseparable, and their combination inspired." He concluded that the record deserves "your immediate adoration."

Reviewing the album retrospectively for AllMusic, Cook describes The English Disease as an "often riveting" record which is "perfect for a few pre-game pints at the pub with your fellow football hooligans." He adds that, due to the "strategic placing of telling fan quotes and 'the nature of sport' sound bytes, this love letter also works as a provocative meditation on soccer's place in England's collective social conscience." In their review of Tackhead's discography, Trouser Press contributors Tony Fletcher and Megan Frampton note the album's application of football chants to "deep, dubby music" and wrote: "It's a fun idea for a couple of tracks, but the repetition turns tiresome by record's end."

== Legacy ==
Redhead situates The English Disease as part of the "footballisation" of pop music which occurred "from the mid-1980s to the early 1990s in Conservative Britain", believing that with the album and Sherwood's other "extraordinary records" as the Barmy Army, the producer exemplified the crossover between football and cutting-edge dance music later taken up by New Order's hit single "World in Motion" (1990). He has also described it as "the best 'football' record ever made", and includes the album in his soccer pop playlist, saying that "On-U Sound, through Adrian Sherwood, define the soccer/music crossover". Jon Savage of The Guardian wrote that, throughout 1989-90, football in the UK became part of the cultural zeitgeist, and that this change was first evident to pop fans via the era's "E culture indie/dance marriage", particularly on The English Disease, Gary Clail's End of the Century Party (1989) and New Order's "World in Motion", the latter released as the transformation was complete. Mark Stewart used the rhythm of "Devo" for his song "These Things Happen", found on the album Metatron (1990).

In an article for Freaky Trigger, Ewing wrote that, as with other albums that mix rhythms and found sounds, "the magic is in how the stiffer machine rhythms co-exist with the looser, unplanned patterns of speech, and in this case, the rough choral blizzard of voices in a football crowd", likening it to a "terrace" equivalent of Brian Eno and David Byrne's My Life in the Bush of Ghosts (1981). He also noted its "powerful sense of place of time", writing that The English Disease appeared between the Hillsborough tragedy and the 1990 FIFA World Cup, "a season of tension and change in English football and society which the LP addresses head on". He commented: "How it might have sounded in 1989 – stirring? corny? – I can't know. The formal argument it makes – that a collage of samples and beats can capture the truth of a moment – has fallen out of fashion. The specific arguments it makes or hints at are long since won or lost. But for an hour it captured me."

== Track listing ==
1989 vinyl release

Side one
No.	Title	Writer(s)	Length
1.	"Leroy's Boots"	Skip McDonald, Adrian Sherwood, Doug Wimbish	4:17
2.	"Sharp as a Needle"	Adrian Sherwood	3:35
3.	"Stadium Rock"	Skip McDonald, Adrian Sherwood	4:25
4.	"Bobby Just Can't Win"	Carlton "Bubblers" Ogilvie, Adrian Sherwood, Doug Wimbish	3:55
5.	"Psycho + The Wombles of Div.1"	Adrian Sherwood, Kishi Yamamoto	3:12

Side two
No.	Title	Writer(s)	Length
6.	"Brian Clout"	Skip McDonald, Adrian Sherwood, Doug Wimbish	3:43
7.	"Devo"	David Harrow, Adrian Sherwood, Doug Wimbish	5:25
8.	"Mind the Gap"	David Harrow, Skip McDonald, Adrian Sherwood, Doug Wimbish	4:09
9.	"Civil Liberty"	Adrian Sherwood, Doug Wimbish, Kishi Yamamoto	4:43
10.	"Que Sera, Sera"	Livingston & Evans	3:04

1990 CD release

CD track listing
No.	Title	Writer(s)	Length
1.	"Leroy's Boots"	Skip McDonald, Adrian Sherwood, Doug Wimbish	4:17
2.	"Sharp as a Needle"	Adrian Sherwood	3:35
3.	"Stadium Rock"	Skip McDonald, Adrian Sherwood	4:25
4.	"Bobby Just Can't Win"	Carlton "Bubblers" Ogilvie, Adrian Sherwood, Doug Wimbish	3:55
5.	"Psycho + The Wombles of Div.1"	Adrian Sherwood, Kishi Yamamoto	3:12
6.	"Brian Clout"	Skip McDonald, Adrian Sherwood, Doug Wimbish	3:43
7.	"Devo"	David Harrow, Adrian Sherwood, Doug Wimbish	5:25
8.	"Mind the Gap"	David Harrow, Skip McDonald, Adrian Sherwood, Doug Wimbish	4:09
9.	"Civil Liberty"	Adrian Sherwood, Doug Wimbish, Kishi Yamamoto	4:43
10.	"England 2 Yugoslavia 0"	Adrian Sherwood, Doug Wimbish, Kishi Yamamoto	4:39
11.	"Liquidator"	Harry J	2:14
12.	"Billy Bonds M.B.E." (extended remix)	Adrian Sherwood	6:02
13.	"Que Sera, Sera" (remix)	Livingston & Evans	3:05

== Personnel ==
Adapted from the liner notes of The English Disease

Musicians

- David Harrow – keyboards (A4), programming (B2), drum programming (B3)
- Al Jourgensen – keyboards (A2)
- Skip McDonald – guitar (A1, A3, B1-B3), producer (A1, B1, B5)
- Mike – keyboards (A5)
- Bonjo Iyabinghi Noah – percussion (A1, A3, A4, B1, B4)
- Carlton "Bubblers" Ogilvie – bass guitar (A3, A4)
- Rolo – bass guitar (A2)
- Style Scott – drums (A2, A3-A5, B4)
- Adrian Sherwood – effects (A2), producer, recording
- Doug Wimbish – bass guitar (A1, A4, B1-B5), drum programming (A1, B1, B5), producer (A1, B1, B5)
- Jah Wobble – percussion (A5, B4)
- Kishi Yamamoto – bass guitar (A5, B4), keyboards (A4)

Technical personnel

- Steve Barker – recording
- Steve "Barney" Chase – engineering
- Kevin Metcalfe – mastering
- Andy Montgomery – engineering
- Dave Pine – engineering
- Steve Redhead – recording
- Marc Williams – recording

== Release history ==
Region	Date	Label	Format	Catalog
United Kingdom	1989	On-U Sound	LP	ON-U LP48
United Kingdom	1990	On-U Sound	CD	ON-U CD8
United Kingdom	1998	On-U Sound	CD	ON-U CD 0048

== See also ==
- Association football culture
