= Time Boom X De Devil Dead =

Studio album by Lee "Scratch" Perry + Dub Syndicate
- Released: 1987
- Recorded: 1987
- Genres: Reggae, dub
- Label: On-U Sound
- Producers: Adrian Sherwood, Lee Perry

Lee "Scratch" Perry + Dub Syndicate chronology
Battle of Armagideon (Millionaire Liquidator) (1986)	Time Boom X De Devil Dead (1987)	On the Wire

Professional ratings
Review scores
Source	Rating
AllMusic	3/5 stars
The Encyclopedia of Popular Music	3/5 stars
(The New) Rolling Stone Album Guide	3/5 stars

Time Boom X De Devil Dead is a 1987 studio album by Lee Perry and Dub Syndicate. It was re-released in 1994 by On-U Sound and in 2001 by EMI Records.

The album was something of a comeback for Perry.

== Critical reception ==
Trouser Press wrote that "while perhaps lacking the eccentric edge of Perry’s own work, the LP is still weird and wonderful, a sample of some of the best avant-garde groove music being made today." Exclaim! called it Perry's best album of the 1980s. NME ranked it No. 34 on its "50 Best Albums of 1987" list.

== Track listing ==
Side A

1. "S.D.I." (6:27)
2. "Blinkers" (4:58)
3. "Jungle" (7:33) (Bass – Evar Wellington, guitar – Martin Frederix, keyboards – Kishi Yamamoto, vocals – Akabu)
4. "De Devil Dead" (4:29) (Vocals – Akabu)

Side B

1. "Music + Science Lovers" (5:05) (Bass – Doctor Pablo, guitar – Doctor Pablo)
2. "Kiss the Champion" (7:13)
3. "Allergic to Lies" (3:53) (Keyboards – Kishi Yamamoto)
4. "Time Conquer" (4:31) (Guitar – Martin Frederix, keyboards – Kishi Yamamoto, piano – Kishi Yamamoto)

1994 release

9. "Jungle (Original 7" Version)" (3:46)
10. "Jungle (Wall of China)" (2:52)
11. "Night Train" (3:04)

== First release ==
The album was first released in 1987.

- Bass – Errol "Flabba" Holt
- Drums – Lincoln "Style" Scott
- Engineer – A.M. Sherwood, Derek Birket
- Guitar – Bingy Bunny, Dwight Pinkney
- Keyboards – Peter "Doctor Pablo" Stroud
- Percussion – Bonjo Iyabinghi Noah
- Piano – Steely
- Saxophone – "Deadly" Headley Bennett
- Artwork and sleeve concept – Lee Perry
- Mastered by Kevin Metcalfe
- Photography, artwork, sleeve design – Kishi

== Second release ==
A version with electronic remixes was released in 1994 in On-U Sound.

- Bass – Errol "Flabba" Holt
- Bass, guitar, keyboards – Doctor Pablo
- Drums – Style Scott
- Guitar – Bingy Bunny, Dwight
- Keyboards – Kishi Yamamoto (tracks: 3,7,8,9,10)
- Percussion – Bonjo Iyabinghi Noah
- Piano – Steely
- Saxophone – "Deadly" Headley Bennett
- Vocals – Akabu (tracks: 3,4,9,10)
