= If You Want Loyalty Buy a Dog =

Studio album by Little Axe
- Released: October 24, 2011
- Recorded: Channell One Studio, Jamaica, Livingston Studio, London, On-U Studio, Crouch End/Hornsey, London and Southern Studio, Wood Green, London
- Genre: Blues; dub
- Length: 53:59
- Label: On-U Sound
- Producer: Skip McDonald, Adrian Sherwood

Little Axe chronology
| Bought for a Dollar, Sold for a Dime (2010) | If You Want Loyalty Buy a Dog (2011) | Return (2013) |

Professional ratings
Review scores
| Source | Rating |
|---|---|
| Allmusic | 4/5 stars |
| Uncut | 4/5 stars |

If You Want Loyalty Buy a Dog is the seventh album by Little Axe, released on October 24, 2011, by On-U Sound. It was the first album Skip McDonald produced without the aid of fellow Tackhead members Keith LeBlanc and Doug Wimbish.

== Track listing ==
| No. | Title | Writer(s) | Length |
|---|---|---|---|
| 1. | "Song to Sing" | Skip McDonald, Adrian Sherwood | 3:19 |
| 2. | "Keep on Drinking" | Skip McDonald, Huddie Ledbetter | 4:10 |
| 3. | "Come Here Dog and Get Your Bone" | Skip McDonald, Style Scott | 4:17 |
| 4. | "I Got Da Blues" | Skip McDonald, Style Scott | 4:12 |
| 5. | "Call It What You Like" | Skip McDonald, Style Scott | 3:55 |
| 6. | "I Ain't Going Down" | Skip McDonald, Adrian Sherwood | 4:15 |
| 7. | "Grace" | William Walker, John Newton | 3:59 |
| 8. | "Down and Dirty" | Skip McDonald, George Oban | 3:47 |
| 9. | "Seeing Red" | Skip McDonald, Adrian Sherwood | 3:46 |
| 10. | "Moaning and Groaning" | Skip McDonald, Adrian Sherwood | 3:31 |
| 11. | "Garfield Elementary" | Skip McDonald, George Oban | 3:14 |
| 12. | "National Style" | Skip McDonald, George Oban | 3:20 |
| 13. | "Early in the Morning" | Skip McDonald, Style Scott | 3:53 |
| 14. | "Where From Here?" | Skip McDonald, Style Scott | 4:21 |

== Personnel ==
Musicians

- Alan Glen – harmonica
- Skip McDonald – vocals, guitar, keyboards, producer, bass guitar (2, 7)
- George Oban – bass guitar (1, 6, 8, 9, 11, 12)
- Style Scott – drums

Additional personnel

- Steve Barker – spoken word
- Dub Syndicate – backup band (4, 5, 10, 13)
- Madeline Edgehill – vocals (7)
- The Roots Radics – backup band (3, 14)
- Valerie Skeete – vocals (7)

Technical personnel

- Lincoln "Style" Scott – co-producer
- Adrian Sherwood – producer

== Release history ==
| Region | Date | Label | Format | Catalog |
|---|---|---|---|---|
| United Kingdom | 2011 | On-U Sound | CD | On-UCD1019 |
