= Hard Grind =

Studio album by Little Axe
- Released: June 11, 2002
- Recorded: On-U Sound Studios and Konk Studios, London, England
- Genre: Blues; dub
- Length: 48:35
- Label: On-U Sound
- Producer: Skip McDonald, Adrian Sherwood

Little Axe chronology
Slow Fuse (1996)	Hard Grind (2002)	Champagne & Grits (2004)

Professional ratings
Review scores
Source	Rating
Allmusic	4/5 stars
Alternative Press	3.5/5 stars
NME	8/10
Q	3/5 stars
Vibe	4/5 stars

Hard Grind is the third album by Little Axe, released on June 11, 2002 by On-U Sound Records.

== Track listing ==
All tracks are written by Skip McDonald and Adrian Sherwood.

No.	Title	Length
1.	"Dark as the Night Cold as the Ground"	2:52
2.	"Blues Story II"	5:13
3.	"Run Here Boy"	5:34
4.	"One Drop Blues"	3:41
5.	"All Night Party"	3:45
6.	"Midnight Dream"	4:03
7.	"A Long Way to Go"	4:04
8.	"Walk Right Shoes"	3:37
9.	"Down to the Valley"	5:31
10.	"Tight Like That"	5:28
11.	"Seek That Truth"	4:47

== Personnel ==
Musicians

- Tony Duffy – guitar (1)
- Alan Glen – harmonica (2, 3, 5, 6, 10)
- Kieran Kiely – pipes (3)
- Keith LeBlanc – drums (2, 6–11)
- Carlton "Bubblers" Ogilvie – keyboards, melodica, backing vocals (4, 10)
- Jayme McDonald – vocals (6)
- Skip McDonald – guitar, bass guitar, keyboards, backing vocals, producer
- Nick Plytas – keyboards (2)
- Ghetto Priest – backing vocals (7, 9–11)
- Bim Sherman – vocals (11), backing vocals (9)
- Doug Wimbish – bass guitar (3, 5–9, 11)

Technical personnel

- Alan Branch – engineering
- Nick Coplowe – engineering
- Darren Grant – engineering
- Kevin Metcalfe – mastering
- Adrian Sherwood – producer

== Release history ==
Region	Date	Label	Format	Catalog
United Kingdom	2002	On-U Sound	CD	ON-U CD 1001
United States	2002	Fat Possum	CD	80357-2

== In pop culture ==
The song "Down to the Valley" was featured in the 2003 Disney film Holes.
