= Don Campbell (musician) =

British reggae singer

- Origin: London, England
- Genres: Reggae; Roots Reggae; Dub; lovers rock; R&B
- Occupations: Singer, songwriter
- Instrument: Vocals
- Years active: 1980s–present
- Labels: Jet Star; VP; Mango; Island Records; Ruff Cutt; Charm

Don Campbell is a British reggae singer from north-west London, best known for his lovers rock records released since the mid-1990s.

== Biography ==
Don Campbell was a member of Carlton 'Bubblers' Ogilvie and Tony 'Ruff Cutt' Phillips' Undivided Roots band, Creation Rebel, Singers and Players and Dub Syndicate in the early 1980s before embarking on a solo career. Campbell also played drums on Vivian Jones (singer) works, which proved much in demand in the Jah Shaka dances of that spiritually conscious, roots and culture period.

Don Campbell also played drums on Bim Sherman's Across the Red Sea album, which included Sherman's take on the 19th-century hymn, When The Roll Is Called Up Yonder. as well as Bim Sherman's cover of Stranger Cole and Gladstone Anderson's Just Like a River tune. Notably, Don Campbell also played drums and percussion on the first groundbreaking Dub Syndicate album, The Pounding System (Ambience In Dub), released in 1982. Amongst a mostly original collection of compositions, the album featured versions of contemporaneous Prince Far I tracks, in particular, one vocal and dub song being an account of the life of Pan Africanist Jamaican Revivalist Preacher, Alexander Bedward. The album also features a dub take on The Techniques and Pat Kelly Sonia Pottinger High Note label hit, "You Don't Care." In the same year, Don Campbell also played drums on Creation Rebel's Lows and Highs album, which featured the Discomix entitled Independent Man, which was a take on Dennis Brown's Easy Take it Easy and Bob Andy's Unchained AKA Set Me Free. The same album featured a version of John Holt's A Love I Can Feel, which was based on The Temptations tune, I Want a Love I Can See.

In 1983, Don Campbell played drums on the Singers and Players Staggering Heights release, with vocalist Congo Ashanti Roy of The Congoes, The Roots Radics, and George Oban, who had also played bass for Aswad and Burning Spear. Renowned veteran foundation horns player Headley Bennett, who had gained a reputation from decades of work at Coxsone Dodd's Studio One and from playing with The Revolutionaries at Maxwell Avenue Channel One Studios, features on both albums, which were recorded at Berry Street Studio and The Manor Studio, locations which at the time were developing growing reputations for reggae musicians as well as with artists from other genres.

He released his first single in 1993 and immediately entered the British reggae charts. His first three singles and debut album all topped the charts, and he received six awards at the 1994 British Reggae Industry Awards. He then teamed up with General Saint and released a series of records, including a version of Neil Sedaka's "Oh! Carol", which was a minor UK Singles Chart hit, reaching number 54. They followed this with "Save the Last Dance for Me", which was also a hit, reaching number 75, and "Stop That Train" ( originally by The Spanishtonians, then popularised by Keith & Tex. The song has also been covered by Bim Sherman and Style Scott with Dub Syndicate ). Their collaborations were collected together on the 1995 album Time on the Move. In 1997 Campbell teamed up with UK roots saxophonist Winston Rose to record "Give Thanks" Dubplate, later released on Saxon Studio International sound system's record label, receiving significant attention from the followers of Jah Shaka and Lloyd Coxsone sound systems. He has recorded several albums since, including a version of the Bee Gees's "Islands in the Stream" with J. C. Lodge, and performed at the Bob Marley Day Festival in Long Beach, California in 2003.

== Discography ==
- Bim Sherman – Across The Red Sea (1982) ( plays drums )
- Dub Syndicate The Pounding System (Ambience in Dub) (1982) ( plays drums )
- Creation Rebel – Lows & Highs (1982) ( plays drums )
- Creation Rebel – Independent Man (Pts. 1/2) Discomix (1982) ( plays drums )
- Undivided Roots – England Cold Discomix (1982) ( plays drums )
- Undivided Roots – Roots Rockers Discomix (1982) ( Vocals-drums )
- Singers & Players Staggering Heights (1983) ( plays drums )
- Dub Syndicate – One Way System (1983) ( plays drums on Independence, which is a version of Independent Man)
- On-U Sound Records compilation, Various – Pay It All Back Vol.1 ( 1985 ) ( plays drums on Singers & Players–Prince Far I's track,Bedward The Flying Preacher)
- Prince Hammer – Vengeance (1985) ( Rhythm Guitar, drums )
- Undivided Roots – Rock Dis Ya Music Discomix (1982) ( Vocals-drums )
- Undivided Roots – Undivided Roots (1990) Vocals, Drums, Guitar
- The Album (1994), Juggling
- Undivided Roots- Ruff Cutt-Starkey Banton-Lloydie Crucial – Its A Roadblock (1994) Vocals
- Undivided Roots – Hands & Heart - Together (1995) Vocals
- Time on the Move (1995), Copasetic – with General Saint
- Give Thanks (1997) Saxon Studio International Saxon Records
- Rise Up (2001), Artists Only
- Reggae Max (2001), Jet Star
- Flex (2001), Angella
- Any Day Now (2003), VP
- Door No. 1 (2003), Jet Star
