= Headley Bennett =

- Also known as: Deadly Headley
- Born: Felix Headley Bennett; 29 May 1931; Kingston, Jamaica
- Died: 21 August 2016 (aged 85)
- Genres: Ska; rocksteady; reggae; roots reggae dub
- Instrument: Saxophone
- Years active: Late 1950s–2016

Felix Headley Bennett OD (29 May 1931 – 21 August 2016), also known as Deadly Headley, was a prolific Jamaican saxophonist who performed on hundreds, possibly thousands, of recordings since the 1950s.

== Biography ==
Born in Kingston, Jamaica, Bennett attended the Alpha Boys School from the age of five, where he learned to play the saxophone. He left Alpha aged fifteen. Since the 1950s, Bennett has worked as a session musician in Jamaica, playing in the Studio One house band as well as in Lynn Taitt's band The Jets, The Mighty Vikings, and in The Revolutionaries.

In 1962, as a member of The Sheiks, he performed at Palisadoes Airport to greet Princess Margaret on her visit to the island to mark Jamaica's independence.

In the ska era of the late 1950s and 1960s, Headley Bennett played on many recordings for a variety of studios including Bob Marley's first recording, "Judge Not", for Leslie Kong, and Derrick & Patsy Todd's "Housewives Choice". Headley also played on The Wailers' Dancing Shoes, Delroy Wilson's Dancing Mood and Sound Dimension's Full Up, later versioned by Freddie McGregor as Africa Here I Come.

Prince Buster claimed Bennett's solo in Derrick Morgan's song "Forward March" was stolen from Lester Sterling's solo in Buster's own track "They Got to Come", leading to a feud between Buster and Morgan. In 1967, he recorded with Bob Andy, releasing the conscious rocksteady tune, I've Got To Go Back Home, and then in 1969, he recorded a version of Slim Smith's Everybody Needs Love, with the 'a' side entitled Sun Valley and attributed to Peter Tosh, with Headley's 'b' side entitled The Drums of Fu Manchu.

He went on to record with The Abyssinians, Soul Syndicate, Lloyd Parks' Skin Flesh and Bones and We the People Band, The Professionals, Alton Ellis, Ja-Man Allstars and Prince Far I, notably on Cry Tuff Dub Encounter Chapter IV, which versioned tunes from Ras Michael & The Sons Of Negus Revelation album, amongst many others.

In the late 1960s Headley Bennett moved to Canada, returning to Jamaica in 1977, playing in the late 70s on Horace Andy's Tappa Zukie Stars label discomix, If I wasn't a Man, built around a variation on the horns refrain from Sound Dimension's Real Rock rhythm, as well as playing on Mikey Dread's Dread at the Controls releases, also contributing to records by Frankie Paul, Al Campbell, Ossie Hibbert, U Brown, Errol Scorcher and Ernest Wilson.

Throughout the late 1970s and early 1980s, Bennett was consistently in demand and he worked prolifically, featuring on King Tubby's, Prince Jammy and Scientist produced albums by Hugh Mundell, Sonya Spence, Augustus Pablo, Leonard Dillon, The Gladiators, Barrington Levy and The Chantells.

Whilst the majority of his recordings have been as a session musician, he has released two albums where he is credited as the main artist : in the late 1970s he released an album of instrumental versions of R&B, doo wop compositions and soul music ballads with Ossie Scott, entitled Deadly Headly Bennett Meets The Magnificent Ossie Scott, and then in 1981 he recorded a spiritually conscious roots reggae dub album, 35 Years From Alpha, with producer Adrian Sherwood, Style Scott of The Roots Radics, Creation Rebel, Eskimo Fox ( also a graduate of Alpha School ), Carlton Bubblers Ogilvie, Tony Philips and Bim Sherman, featuring versions of The Abyssinians' Satta Massagana as well as Discomix takes on Dennis Brown's Easy Take it Easy and Bob Andy's Unchained AKA Set Me Free. The album was recorded at Harry J's in Jamaica, Gooseberry Sound Studios, Berry Street Studio and The Manor Studio in England, and in 1981 and 1982, he also played on Singers and Players, Creation Rebel, African Head Charge and Dub Syndicate Discomixes and albums.

In the 1990s, noted British reggae historiographer, chronologist and archivist Steve Barrow and Simply Red’s Mick Hucknall collected some of Headley Bennett’s Prince Alla and Soul Syndicate discomixes, drawn from Heaven is my Roof and Freedom Sounds releases, and reissued them on their Blood and Fire (record label), thereby introducing Headley Bennett’s work to new generations of listeners worldwide, and in 2005, aged 74, Bennett was awarded the prestigious Order of Distinction in the esteemed rank of Officer for his contribution to the development of music by the Jamaican government.

He was revealed to be in financial difficulties in 2013, suffering from back and prostate problems due to mounting medical bills.

Bennet died on 21 August 2016, having recently been diagnosed with prostate cancer.

== Album discography ==
- Deadly Headly Bennett Meets The Magnificent Ossie Scott (197?), Carl's/Gorgon – with Ossie Scott
- 35 Years From Alpha (1982), On-U Sound
- Victory (2001), Sonic Sounds produced by Headley Bennett, co-produced by Danny Thompson.
- Starring Deadley Headley, Danny Thompson and Pam Hall.
- songs include; I'm Still in Love, Victory, Latin Goes Ska, Dancing Mood, Jam Rock, Movie Star, Garden of Love, Roof, Green Green Grass, Rain From the Sky, Red Red Wine, Rocket Ship, Swing Easy and Jackson.
