= Very Big in America Right Now =

Studio album by Voice of Authority
- Released: October 1984
- Recorded: Southern Records and Berry Street Studio, UK
- Genre: Industrial hip hop, electro
- Length: 41:01
- Label: Cherry Red, On-U Sound
- Producer: Adrian Sherwood

Adrian Sherwood chronology
Very Big in America Right Now (1984)	The English Disease (1989)

Professional ratings
Review scores
Source	Rating
AllMusic	3.5/5 stars

Very Big in America Right Now is an album by Adrian Sherwood issued under the moniker Voice of Authority. It was released in October 1984 by Cherry Red Records and On-U Sound Records. "Knock the House Down" is a remixed version of "Blessed Are Those Who Struggle" from Mark Stewart's 1983 debut album Learning to Cope with Cowardice.

== Track listing ==
No.	Title	Writer(s)	Length
1.	"(Short Intro) Knock the House Down"	Mark Stewart	1:35
2.	"Very Big in America Right Now"	Nick Plytas, Adrian Sherwood	6:55
3.	"Middle East Power Station"	Adrian Sherwood	4:35
4.	"In Another World"	Shara Nelson, Kishi Yamamoto	7:12

Side two
No.	Title	Writer(s)	Length
1.	"Stopping and Starting"	Nick Plytas, Adrian Sherwood	5:56
2.	"Technical Miracle"	Adrian Sherwood	5:08
3.	"Slipped Disco"	Nick Plytas, Adrian Sherwood	1:57
4.	"Grand Prix"	Evar Wellington, Kishi Yamamoto	2:47
5.	"Feeling Wild"	Evar Wellington, Kishi Yamamoto	4:56

== Personnel ==
Musicians

- Keith Logan – vocals (B1)
- Eskimo Fox – drums (B4)
- Shara Nelson – vocals (A4)
- Nick Plytas – keyboards
- Adrian Sherwood – vocals, drums, producer
- Evar Wellington – bass guitar (B4, B5)
- Kishi Yamamoto – keyboards

Technical personnel

- Kevin Metcalfe – mastering

== Release history ==
Region	Date	Label	Format	Catalog
United Kingdom	1984	Cherry Red	LP	BRED 62
France	1984	On-U Sound	LP	On-U LP 35
Germany	1988	Trance	LP	TCLP 4.00609 J
United Kingdom	1991	Cherry Red	CD	CD BRED 62
