= Dub Setter =

Remix album by Lee "Scratch" Perry and Adrian Sherwood
- Released: January 2009
- Recorded: On-U Sound Studios, London, UK
- Genre: Dub
- Length: 45:12
- Label: Beat, On-U Sound
- Producer: Adrian Sherwood

Adrian Sherwood chronology
Becoming a Cliché (2006)	Dub Setter (2009)	Survival & Resistance (2012)

Professional ratings
Review scores
Source	Rating
AllMusic	4/5 stars

Dub Setter is a remix album by Jamaican reggae producer Lee "Scratch" Perry and British producer Adrian Sherwood, released January 2009 on Beat Records. The release comprises remixed tracks from Perry's 2008 album The Mighty Upsetter.

== Track listing ==
No.	Title	Writer(s)	Length
1.	"His Master's Voice"	Lee "Scratch" Perry	4:15
2.	"Wake Up Call"	Lee "Scratch" Perry	5:01
3.	"Lucky Tarzan"	Lee "Scratch" Perry, Adrian Sherwood	5:59
4.	"Pick 'n' Mix"	Skip McDonald, Lee "Scratch" Perry	3:05
5.	"Elixir of Life"	Nadaka, Lee "Scratch" Perry, Zilverzurfarn	5:09
6.	"Yellow Fever"	Lee "Scratch" Perry	4:42
7.	"Taboo"	Margarita Lecuona	4:29
8.	"Flush It"	Skip McDonald, Lee "Scratch" Perry, Adrian Sherwood	3:51
9.	"All Will Be Well in the Garden"	Lee "Scratch" Perry, Leroy Sibbles	3:56
10.	"Kingston Tower"	Lee "Scratch" Perry	3:56

== Personnel ==
- Lee "Scratch" Perry – vocals
- Adrian Sherwood – producer

== Release history ==
Region	Date	Label	Format	Catalog
Japan	2009	Beat	CD	BRC-219
United Kingdom	2010	On-U Sound	CD	ONUCD1006
United Kingdom	2010	On-U Sound	LP	ONULP126
