= Jah Woosh =

Jamaican musician

- Born: Neville Beckford; 1952
- Origin: Kingston, Jamaica
- Died: 21 February 2011 (aged 58)
- Genres: Reggae
- Instrument: Vocals

Neville Beckford (1952 – 21 February 2011), better known as Jah Woosh, was a Jamaican reggae deejay and record producer, primarily known for his work in the 1970s.

== Biography ==
Born in Kingston, Jamaica, Beckford served an apprenticeship as a mechanic before forming a duo with Reggae George, Neville & George, and auditioning for Jamaica's top producers. Unsuccessful as a duo, they both went on to solo careers. Beckford became the resident deejay on Prince Lloyd's sound system, and was noticed by producer George Bell, who took him into the studio to record "Angela Davis", now under the pseudonym Jah Woosh. Although the single was not a hit, it prompted Rupie Edwards to produce the debut album, Jah Woosh, released in 1974 on the United Kingdom Cactus label. Chalice Blaze and Psalms of Wisdom followed in 1976, these three albums establishing a reputation in the UK. A string of albums and singles followed through the 1970s and early 1980s.

Woosh also contributed to Adrian Sherwood's Singers & Players collective, appearing on albums by Creation Rebel, Prince Far I, Bim Sherman, and Style Scott's Dub Syndicate.

Beckford also worked as a producer, self-producing much of his work from 1976 onwards, and producing other artists such as Bim Sherman, Horace Andy, Larry Marshall, and his old friend Reggae George. He set up the "Original Music" record label, through which he has reissued some of his 1970s material.

He died on 21 February 2011, aged 58.

== Albums ==
- Jah Woosh (1974) Cactus
- Psalms of Wisdom (1976) Ja-Man/Black Wax
- Chalice Blaze (1976) Midnite/Student
- Dreadlocks Affair (1976) Trojan
- Loaded with TNT (1976) Trenchtown
- Jah Jah Dey Dey (1976) Cactus
- Lick Him with the Dustbin (1977) K&B
- Gathering Israel (1978) Dread & Dread
- Religious Dread (1978) Trojan
- Spiderlemon (1978) JP Records
- Gun Fight at OK Karrol (1978) Pioneer International
- Ital Movement (197?) Abraham
- Marijuana World Tour (1979) Creation Rebel
- Rebellion (1981) Form (with Sis Bee)
- Rastaman (1981) German LP
- Sing And Chant Jah Woosh (1982) September
- Some Sign (1985) Sky Juice
- Jah bless the children (1986) produced by Neville Beckford aka Jah Woosh on Sky Juice
- Fire in a Blackamix (1993) Blackamix (with Mixman)

=== Compilations ===
- We Chat You Rock (1987) Trojan (with I-Roy)
- The Best of Jah Woosh (1993) Rhino
- Dub Plate Special (1993) Original Music
- Jah Woosh Meets Jah Stitch at Leggo Sounds (1995) Leggo (with Jah Stitch)
- DJ Legend Original Music
- Collection (2001) Original Music
