= Sharp as a Needle =

Single by Barmy Army
- B-side: "England 2 Yugoslavia 0"
- Released: January 1988
- Genre: Industrial hip hop, electro
- Length: 6:27
- Label: On-U Sound
- Songwriter: Adrian Sherwood
- Producer: Adrian Sherwood

"Sharp as a Needle" is a single by British producer Adrian Sherwood, issued under the moniker "The Barmy Army". It was released in January 1988 by On-U Sound Records and would appear on Barmy Army's sole album The English Disease, released in 1989. Continuing the sports theme established on Tackhead's "The Game", Sherwood released "Sharp as a Needle" single as a tribute to Scottish football player Kenny Dalglish, who is represented on the front cover holding the European Cup.

== Formats and track listing ==
UK 12" single (ON-U DP 18)

1. "Sharp as a Needle" (Adrian Sherwood) – 6:27
2. "England 2 Yugoslavia 0" (Adrian Sherwood, Doug Wimbish, Kishi Yamamoto) – 4:40

== Personnel ==
- Adrian Sherwood – producer

== Charts ==
Chart (1987)	Peak position
UK Indie Chart	4
