= African Head Charge =

Psychedelic dub ensemble

African Head Charge is a psychedelic dub ensemble active since 1981, when they released their debut album, recorded at Berry Street Studio in London, which was, at the time, run by Dennis Bovell.

The group was formed by percussionist Bonjo Iyabinghi Noah, and featured a revolving cast of members, including the original members of Creation Rebel, Undivided Roots, Carlton "Bubblers" Ogilvie and Crucial Tony Phillips of Ruff Cutt, Style Scott of The Roots Radics and The Dub Syndicate, George Oban (bassist who had played with Aswad and Burning Spear, also working with Karl Pitterson), Headley Bennett, Prisoner, Crocodile (both pseudonyms for Adrian Sherwood), Nick Plytas (originally from 1970s pub rock band Roogalator), Sonny Akpan (aka Jah Wisdom) of The Funkees, Steve Beresford of General Strike and Brian Eno's Portsmouth Sinfonia, Bruce Smith of Public Image Ltd, Junior Moses (aka Reuben Moses, who had previously played with Ijahman Levi), Evar Wellington of British roots reggae band The Makka Bees, Skip McDonald, Gaudi and Jah Wobble. Martin Frederix, sound engineer and live-mixer for This Heat also contributed to the band, playing bass and mixing some of the tracks on Songs of Praise.

The group released most of its albums on Adrian Sherwood's label, On-U Sound, with much of the iconic sleeve-design artwork provided by photographer, Kishi Yamamoto, who also played keyboards, Guzheng Chinese Harp and Pipa Chinese lute on some of the compositions.

Journalist David Stubbs, writing in The Wire, said, "The notion of African Head Charge was hatched when Adrian Sherwood read Brian Eno's comment about his vision for a 'psychedelic Africa'".

All of their early work has been re-released as double albums on vinyl and CD.

== Discography ==
- My Life in a Hole in the Ground (On-U Sound, 1981). Line up included Sherwood, Style Scott, Keith Logan (“Lizard”) and Charlie "Eskimo" Fox (“Mus’come”)
- Environmental Studies (On-U Sound, 1982)
- Drastic Season (On-U Sound, 1983)
- Off the Beaten Track (On-U Sound, 1986 Anthology Recordings, 2006)
- Great Vintage Volumes 1 & 2 (On-U Sound, 1989) (compilation)
- Songs of Praise (On-U Sound, 1990)
- Live:Pride and Joy (On-U Sound, 1991)
- In Pursuit of Shashamane Land (On-U Sound, ON-U LP65, 1993)
- All Mighty Dread (Beat Records, 1994) (compilation)
- Touch I EP (On-U Sound, 1994)
- Akwaaba (Acid Jazz Records, 1995)
- Sankofa (Bonjo I, 1997)
- Drums Of Defiance: African Head Charge Versus Professor Stretch (On-U Sound, ON-ULP93, 1998)
- Noah House of Dread (Bonjo I, 1998)
- Live Goodies (Bonjo I, 2001)
- Shrunken Head (On-U Sound, 2003) (compilation)
- Vision of a Psychedelic Africa (On-U Sound, 2005)
- In Charge:Live in Japan EP (On-U Sound, 2005)
- Voodoo of The Godsent (On-U Sound, 2011)
- Return Of The Crocodile (On-U Sound, 2016)
- Churchical Chant Of The Iyabinghi (On-U Sound, 2020)
- A Trip to Bolgatanga (On-U Sound, 2023)
