= The Collapse of Everything =

Studio album by Adrian Sherwood
- Released: 22 August 2025
- Length: 38:07
- Label: On-U Sound
- Producer: Adrian Sherwood

Adrian Sherwood chronology
Fire (2023)	The Collapse of Everything (2025)

The Collapse of Everything is the ninth studio album by English dub record producer Adrian Sherwood. It was released on 22 August 2025 via his On-U Sound Records label. It is Sherwood's first non-collaborative release since 2012 when he released Survival & Resistance.

== Reception ==
Professional ratings
Review scores
Source	Rating
AllMusic	4/5 stars
The Arts Desk	3/5 stars
MusicOMH	4/5 stars

MusicOMH's Ben Hogwood rated the album four stars and commented, "For in spite of the occasional loss of focus this is a sonic melting pot, welcoming all styles and colours that interact with the legendary producer's instincts."

The album received a four-star rating from AllMusic, whose reviewer Paul Simpson described it as "a powerful, sometimes harrowing work that lives up to Sherwood's lofty standards."

The Arts Desk assigned it a rating of three stars, noting it "shows that Adrian Sherwood is more than capable of bringing plenty to the party without having to rely on the big names."

== Track listing ==
The Collapse of Everything track listing
No.	Title	Writer(s)	Length
1.	"The Collapse of Everything"	Adrian Sherwood; Mark Bandola; Alex White	3:53
2.	"Dub Inspector"	Sherwood	3:32
3.	"The Well Is Poisoned (Dub)"	Brian Eno	3:53
4.	"Body Roll"	Sherwood; Doug Wimbish; White	3:35
5.	"Battles Without Honour and Humanity"	Sherwood; Paul Yebuah	4:15
6.	"Spaghetti Best Western"	Sherwood; Peter Harris; Wimbish	4:33
7.	"The Great Rewilding"	Sherwood; Bandola	4:00
8.	"Spirits (Further Education)"	Sherwood; Bandola	3:24
9.	"Hiroshima Dub Match"	Sherwood; Bandola; Wimbish	3:54
10.	"The Grand Designer"	Sherwood; Bandola; Wimbish	3:08
Total length:			38:07

Japanese edition (bonus tracks)
No.	Title	Writer(s)	Length
11.	"Let's Come Together" (featuring Lee "Scratch" Perry)	Sherwood; Lee Perry; Wimbish	3:13
12.	"Russian Oscillator"	Sherwood	3:30
13.	"Cold War Skank"	Sherwood; Bandola; Wimbish	3:24
Total length:			48:27

== Personnel ==
Credits adapted from Bandcamp and Tidal.

- Adrian Sherwood – production, mixing
- Matthew Smyth – engineering (all tracks), drum programming (track 5)
- Frank Merritt – mastering
- Peter Harris – artwork; guitar, vocals (6)
- Doug Wimbish – bass (1–4, 6, 9, 10)
- Mark Bandola – guitar (1, 4, 7, 9, 10), synthesizers (2, 5, 8, 10), bass (7)
- Alex White – saxophone (2, 4), flute (1, 4), reed organ (4)
- Cyrus Richards – piano, keyboards (1, 2, 7)
- Keith LeBlanc – drums (4, 8)
- Chris Joyce – drums (7, 9)
- Ivan "Celloman" Hussey – cello (3, 8, 10)
- Jazzwad – synthesizers (5, 8)
- Gaudi – synthesizer (2), piano (9)
- Horseman – percussion (2, 10)
- Brian Eno – guitar, vocals, effects (3)
- Dave Fullwood – flugelhorn (2)
- Alan Glen – harmonica (6)
- Crocodile – effects

== Charts ==
Chart performance for The Collapse of Everything
Chart (2025)	Peak position
Scottish Albums (OCC)	89
UK Albums Sales (OCC)	54
UK Independent Albums (OCC)	20
