= Becoming a Cliché =

Studio album by Adrian Sherwood
- Released: 9 October 2006
- Recorded: On-U Sound Studios, London, UK
- Genres: Electro, dub
- Length: 66:55
- Labels: Real World, Virgin
- Producer: Adrian Sherwood

Adrian Sherwood chronology
Never Trust a Hippy (2003)	Becoming a Cliché (2006)	Dub Setter (2009)

Professional ratings
Review scores
Source	Rating
AllMusic	4/5 stars

Becoming a Cliché is the second solo album by British producer Adrian Sherwood. It was released on 9 October 2006 on Real World and Virgin Records.

== Accolades ==
Publication	Country	Accolade	Year	Rank
Q	United Kingdom	Albums of the Year	2006	90

== Track listing ==
No.	Title	Writer(s)	Length
1.	"Animal Magic"	Adrian Maxwell; Lee "Scratch" Perry	4:21
2.	"Two Versions of the Future"	Maxwell	3:57
3.	"A Piece of the Earth"	Earl Lowe	5:26
4.	"Monastery of Sound"	Maxwell	4:53
5.	"Dennis Bovine Part 1 (Tribute to Blackbeard)"	Maxwell; Dennis Bovell	4:55
6.	"J'Ai Changé"	Maxwell; Samia Farah	5:36
7.	"You Wonder Why"	Maxwell; Leigh Kenny	5:21
8.	"The House of Games"	Maxwell	4:40
9.	"Nu Rizla"	Maxwell	4:29
10.	"St. Peter's Gate"	Maxwell; Kenny	5:33
11.	"Home Sweet Home"	Maxwell; Angel Salvador	4:34
12.	"Forgive Yourself"	Maxwell	3:41
13.	"All Hands on Desk"	Maxwell; Nick Coplowe	3:59
14.	"Stop the Bloodshed"	Maxwell; Raiz	5:30

Limited edition bonus CD (Dub Cliché)
No.	Title	Writer(s)	Length
1.	"Monkey See, Monkey Dub"	Maxwell	4:02
2.	"Dubshed"	Maxwell; Dennis Alcapone	4:44
3.	"Zoo Time"	Maxwell; Kishi Yamamoto	4:31
4.	"Clichéd Dub Slave"	Maxwell; Bovell	3:52
5.	"The Noise From Brazil"	Maxwell; Farah	4:41
6.	"Stepping Crowd"	Maxwell; Carlton Ogilvie	5:06
7.	"Sans Toupee"	Maxwell	3:58
8.	"Silly Billy" (Activator remix)	Maxwell; Ogilvie; Simon Bogle	4:41
9.	"Moving House"	Maxwell	5:15
10.	"J'Ai Dubé"	Maxwell	3:58
11.	"Dennis Bovine Part 2"	Maxwell; Bovell	3:59
12.	"Silly Old Dub"	Maxwell; Ogilvie	4:29

== Personnel ==
Musicians

- Richard Doswell – saxophone
- Dave Fullwood – trumpet
- Jazzwad – drum programming, piano (6, 7)
- Chris Petter – trombone
- Nick Plytas – Clavinet, organ
- Filip Tavares – violin

Additional musicians

- Dennis Bovell – vocals (5)
- Congo Natty – drum programming (3), co-producer (3)
- Doctor Pablo – melodica (12)
- Samia Farah – backing vocals, vocals (6), melodica (6)
- Emily Sherwood Hyman – spoken word (1)
- Eric Johnson – trombone (9)
- Little Roy – vocals (3)
- Peter Lockett – percussion (2, 9, 13)
- LSK – vocals (7, 10)

Additional musicians (cont.)

- Steven "Lenky" Marsden – drum programming (12)
- Skip McDonald – guitar (1, 4, 6–8, 11)
- Natijah – backing vocals (3)
- Carlton "Bubblers" Ogilvie – drum programming (3), bass guitar (10), piano (14)
- Lee "Scratch" Perry – vocals (1)
- Raiz – vocals (14)
- Prithpal Rajput – percussion (5, 12)
- Bim Sherman – vocals (9)
- Denise Sherwood – backing vocals
- Mark Stewart – vocals (11)

Technical personnel

- Nick Coplowe – engineering, backing vocals, guitar (12, 13), piano (8)
- Adrian Sherwood – producer

== Release history ==
Region	Date	Label	Format	Catalog
United Kingdom	2006	Real World, Virgin	CD	CD RW 141
Japan	2006	Beat	CD	BRC-162LTD
