= Neal Snyman =

Neal Snyman (born 23 March 1971) is one of South Africa's pre-eminent recording engineers.

London: 1987–1995

After moving to London in 1987, Snyman engineered at Butterfly Studio for record-producer and ex-Killing Joke bassist Youth. He worked with Crowded House, Tom Jones, David Bowie, Boy George, Rollo, Faith No More, Heather Nova, Björk, System 7, Steve Hillage and Naomi Campbell.

In the early 1990s Snyman began a long-standing and continuing working-relationship with record-producer Kevin Porée and Berry Street Studio, working with Mark Hole, Joy Tobing, Charlotte Gordon Cumming, Hiding in Public, George Stiles and Anthony Drewe and Freakin Habit Forms.

South Africa: 1995–present

Returning to South Africa in 1995 Snyman continued as a freelance, setting up a working base within the SABC complex. Either as producer or engineer, he has recorded Mango Groove, Springbok Nude Girls, Brenda Fassie, Bayete, Stimela, Prime Circle, The Parlotones, Josie Field, Kaolin Thompson, Collective Soul, Live, Arno Carstens, Colin Vearncombe (Black), Callum MacColl, Christie Henessy, Tananas, Wendy Oldfield, Ian Herman, Eminent Child, Johannes Kerkorrel, Johnny Clegg, Freshly Ground, Karen Zoid, Van Coke Kartel, Chris Chameleon, Frank Opperman and Cassette.

Between 2000 and 2005 Snyman produced the acclaimed direct-to-broadcast Live on Five sessions from the SABC.

As producer, Snyman has won Best Rock Album at the South African Music Awards (SAMA) with Springbok Nude Girls, Arno Carstens and Cassette; and Best Adult Contemporary Album with Wendy Oldfield.

In 2009, Snyman worked alongside New Holland, producing their second album Exploded Views.
