= Stone Cold Ohio =

Studio album by Little Axe
- Released: August 14, 2006
- Recorded: On-U Sound Studios, London, England and Studio Molière, Brussels, Belgium
- Genre: Blues; gospel; dub
- Length: 47:21
- Label: Real World/Virgin
- Producer: Skip McDonald, Adrian Sherwood

Little Axe chronology
Champagne & Grits (2004)	Stone Cold Ohio (2006)	Bought for a Dollar, Sold for a Dime (2010)

Professional ratings
Review scores
Source	Rating
Allmusic	4/5 stars
Mojo	4/5 stars

Stone Cold Ohio is the fifth album by Little Axe, released on August 14, 2006, by Real World Records and Virgin Records.

== Track listing ==
No.	Title	Writer(s)	Length
1.	"If I Had My Way"	Skip McDonald, Mark Stewart	4:10
2.	"Jive Talk"	Skip McDonald, Adrian Sherwood	1:42
3.	"Same People"	Allen Toussaint	3:53
4.	"Rockin' Shoes"	Skip McDonald	3:48
5.	"Pray"	Skip McDonald	2:54
6.	"Prisoner"	Skip McDonald	1:10
7.	"Victims"	Skip McDonald, Adrian Sherwood	4:38
8.	"Let Me Ride"	Skip McDonald	3:17
9.	"Trouble in Mind"	Skip McDonald	3:20
10.	"Blueneck Dub"	Skip McDonald, Adrian Sherwood	3:33
11.	"Hard Times"	Skip James	4:21
12.	"Almighty"	Skip McDonald	3:41
13.	"No Bottom"	Skip McDonald, Adrian Sherwood	3:46
14.	"She"	Will Calhoun	1:54
15.	"No More Mourning"	Skip McDonald	1:14

== Personnel ==
Musicians

- Will Calhoun – drums and percussion (3, 14)
- Madeline Edgehill – backing vocals
- Paget King – keyboards (1, 4, 5, 8)
- Ghetto Priest – backing vocals (1, 4, 5, 8, 12)
- Keith LeBlanc – drum programming (1, 4, 5, 7, 8, 11)
- Skip McDonald – vocals, guitar, producer
- Carlton "Bubblers" Ogilvie – backing vocals
- Denise Sherwood – backing vocals
- Valerie Skeete – backing vocals
- Doug Wimbish – bass guitar (1–5, 8, 9, 11, 12, 14), engineering

Technical personnel

- Nick Coplowe – engineering, mixing, drum programming (2, 3, 6, 9, 10, 12–15)
- Jim Dobson – engineering
- Axel Hirn – engineering
- Kevin Metcalfe – mastering
- Eric Renwart – engineering
- Adrian Sherwood – producer

== Release history ==
Region	Date	Label	Format	Catalog
Europe	2006	Real World/Virgin	CD	CD RW 140
United States	2008	Real World	CD	USCDRW140
