= Survival & Resistance =

Studio album by Adrian Sherwood
- Released: 21 August 2012
- Recorded: On-U Sound Studios, London, UK
- Genre: Electro, dub
- Length: 39:43
- Label: On-U Sound
- Producer: Adrian Sherwood

Adrian Sherwood chronology
Dub Setter (2009)	Survival & Resistance (2012)

Professional ratings
Review scores
Source	Rating
AllMusic	4/5 stars
Mojo	3/5 stars

Survival & Resistance is the third solo album by British producer Adrian Sherwood. It was released on 21 August 2012 on On-U Sound Records.

== Track listing ==
No.	Title	Writer(s)	Length
1.	"Balance"	Adamski, Adrian Sherwood	3:21
2.	"Trapped Here"	Adrian Sherwood	3:59
3.	"U.R.Sound"	Timothy Leary, Adrian Sherwood	4:03
4.	"Starship Bahia"	Guilherme Arantes, Adrian Sherwood	5:25
5.	"Effective"	Skip McDonald, Adrian Sherwood	4:06
6.	"We Flick the Switch"	Ken Downie, Skip McDonald, Adrian Sherwood	4:19
7.	"Bossa 2"	Adrian Sherwood	3:40
8.	"Two Semitones and a River"	Skip McDonald, Adrian Sherwood	4:47
9.	"Last Queen of England"	Adrian Sherwood	3:01
10.	"Greenleaves"	Adrian Sherwood	3:02

== Personnel ==
Musicians

- Kerry Ava – violin, cello
- Skip McDonald – guitar, piano, keyboards
- George Oban – bass guitar
- Adrian Sherwood – sampler, effects, programming, arrangements, producer, mixing

Additional musicians

- Adamski – synthesizer (1, 5)
- Guilherme Arantes – piano (4)
- Crucial Tony – guitar (1, 10)
- Anneli Drecker – vocals (7)
- Ghetto Priest – vocals (2)
- Alan Glen – harp (10)
- Jazzwad – drum programming (9)
- Dr. Timothy Leary – spoken word (3)
- Wayne Maxted – drum programming (4, 8)
- Simone Soul – percussion (4, 8)

Technical personnel

- Rika Ishii – design
- Kevin Metcalfe – mastering
- Dave McEwen – co-producer, mixing

== Release history ==
Region	Date	Label	Format	Catalog
United Kingdom	2012	On-U Sound	CD	ONULP1022
United Kingdom	2012	On-U Sound	LP	ONULP1022
Japan	2012	Beat	CD	BRC-342
