= Forward (The Abyssinians album) =

Studio album by The Abyssinians
- Released: 1982
- Recorded: Dynamic, Joe Gibbs, Harry J., Channel One and Studio One Studios, Kingston, Jamaica
- Genre: Reggae
- Length: 38:33
- Label: Alligator
- Producer: The Abyssinians

The Abyssinians chronology
Arise (1978)	Forward (1982)	Declaration of Dub (1998)

Professional ratings
Review scores
Source	Rating
Allmusic	4.5/5 stars
The Encyclopedia of Popular Music	3/5 stars

Forward is The Abyssinians' third album, released in 1982 (see 1982 in music).

== Track listing ==
1. "Forward Jah" - 3:28
2. "Prophesy" - 3:24
3. "This Is Not the End" - 6:14
4. "Satta Massagana" (Collins, Manning, Manning) - 3:26
5. "Mabrak" - 3:51
6. "Forward Onto Zion" - 3:49
7. "Praise Him" - 3:30
8. "Peculiar Number" (Manning) - 3:48
9. "Peculiar Dub" (Manning) - 4:43
10. "Jerusalem" - 2:20

== Personnel ==
- Bernard Collins - vocals
- Donald Manning - vocals
- Lynford Manning - vocals
- Richard Ace - Keyboards
- Headley Bennett - Alto Saxophone
- Pablove Black - Keyboards
- Fred Breitberg - Engineer
- Tony Chin - Guitar
- Donna Cline - Design
- Glen DeCosta - Flute
- Bobby Ellis - Trumpet
- Eric Frater - Guitar
- "Dirty" Harry Hall - Tenor Saxophone
- Bongo Herman - Percussion
- Clive "Azul" Hunt - Arranger
- Jah Jerry Haynes - Guitar
- Janhor Mwangi JaJa - Photography
- Don D Junior - Trombone
- Eric "Bingy Bunny" Lamont - Guitar
- Wire Lindo - Keyboards
- Robert Lyn - Keyboards
- Carlton Manning - Guitar
- Herman Marquis - Alto Saxophone
- David Martin - Trumpet
- Sylvan Morris - Engineer
- Ozzie - Keyboards
- Lloyd Parks - Bass
- Devon Richardson - Drums
- Carlton "Santa" Davis - Drums
- Eric Schilling - Post Production
- Robbie Shakespeare - Bass, Guitar
- Leroy Sibbles - Bass
- Zoot "Skully" Simms - Percussion
- Earl "Chinna" Smith - Guitar
- Ruddy Thomas - Percussion
- Errol Thompson - Engineer
- Leroy "Horsemouth" Wallace - Drums
- Franklyn Waul - Keyboards
