= Hostile Environment (album) =

Studio album by Creation Rebel
- Released: 6 October 2023
- Label: On-U Sound

Creation Rebel chronology
Lows and Highs (1982)	Hostile Environment (2023)

Hostile Environment is a studio album by English reggae band Creation Rebel. It was released on 6 October 2023 by On-U Sound.

== Critical reception ==
Professional ratings
Aggregate scores
Source	Rating
Metacritic	81/100
Review scores
Source	Rating
AllMusic	4/5 stars
Spill Magazine	4.5/5 stars

Hostile Environment was met with "universal acclaim" reviews from critics. At Metacritic, which assigns a weighted average rating out of 100 to reviews from mainstream publications, this release received an average score of 81, based on 4 reviews.

== Track listing ==
Hostile Environment track listing
No.	Title	Length
1.	"Swiftly (The Right One)"	4:18
2.	"Stonebridge Warrior"	4:44
3.	"Under Pressure"	3:38
4.	"That's More Like It"	4:20
5.	"Jubilee Clock"	3:01
6.	"This Thinking Feeling"	5:04
7.	"Whatever It Takes"	3:13
8.	"Salutation Gardens"	3:29
9.	"Crown Hill Road"	3:41
10.	"The Peoples' Sound"	3:19
11.	"Off the Spectrum"	3:26

== Charts ==
Chart performance for Hostile Environment
Chart (2023)	Peak position
Scottish Albums (OCC)	72
UK Independent Albums (OCC)	18
