= Champagne & Grits =

Studio album by Little Axe
- Released: September 21, 2004
- Recorded: On-U Sound Studios, London, England and Treehouse, Mansfield, CT
- Genre: Blues; dub
- Length: 53:23
- Label: Real World/Virgin
- Producer: Skip McDonald, Adrian Sherwood

Little Axe chronology
Slow Fuse (2002)	Champagne & Grits (2004)	Stone Cold Ohio (2006)

Professional ratings
Review scores
Source	Rating
Allmusic	4.5/5 stars
Down Beat	4/5 stars

Champagne & Grits is the fourth album by Little Axe, released on September 21, 2004, by Real World Records and Virgin Records.

== Track listing ==
No.	Title	Writer(s)	Length
1.	"Grinning in Your Face"	Son House, Skip McDonald	3:57
2.	"Finger on the Trigger"	Skip McDonald, Adrian Sherwood, Mark Stewart	5:09
3.	"Mean Things"	Skip McDonald, Mark Stewart	6:17
4.	"The Way I See It"	Skip McDonald	0:37
5.	"Walk on Water"	Skip McDonald, Adrian Sherwood	4:49
6.	"Go Away Devil"	Skip McDonald, Adrian Sherwood	4:43
7.	"Say My Name"	Skip McDonald, Shara Nelson	4:44
8.	"Take Me Back to the Country"	Skip McDonald	1:00
9.	"All in the Same Boat"	Chris Difford, Skip McDonald, Adrian Sherwood	4:10
10.	"Living and Sleeping in a Dangerous Time"	Skip McDonald, Mark Stewart	5:44
11.	"Will I Ever Get Back Home Again?"	Skip McDonald, Adrian Sherwood	4:21
12.	"Cloud"	Skip McDonald, P. K. CLoud	3:10
13.	"Sinners"	Justin Hinds, Huddie Ledbetter, Skip McDonald	4:42

== Personnel ==
Musicians

- Clubfoot – guitar (7)
- Chris Difford – vocals (9)
- Bernard Fowler – vocals (1, 10, 11)
- Dave Foster – harmonica (3)
- Ghetto Priest – vocals (3, 13)
- Alan Glen – harmonica (2, 6, 11)
- Dorie Jackson – backing vocals (9)
- Junior Delgado – vocals (6, 13)
- Keith LeBlanc – drums (1–3, 5, 6, 11)
- Skip McDonald – vocals, guitar, producer
- Shara Nelson – vocals (7)
- Bernard O'Neill – double bass (13)
- Prithpal Rajput – tabla (5, 10)
- Denise Sherwood – backing vocals (9)
- Doug Wimbish – bass guitar (1–3, 5, 6, 9)

Technical personnel

- Nick Coplowe – programming, engineering
- Adrian Sherwood – producer, mixing
- Chris Weinland – programming, engineering

== Release history ==
Region	Date	Label	Format	Catalog
United States	2004	Real World/Virgin	CD	7243 5 76746 2 1
Europe	2004	Real World	CD	708766 18877 2 3
