= The Wolf that House Built =

Studio album by Little Axe
- Released: 1994
- Recorded: On-U Sound Studios, Roundhouse Studios and The Manor, London, England
- Genre: Blues; dub
- Length: 63:31
- Label: Okeh/Wired
- Producer: Skip McDonald, Adrian Sherwood

Little Axe chronology
The Wolf that House Built (1994)	Slow Fuse (1996)

Professional ratings
Review scores
Source	Rating
AllMusic	4.5/5 stars
Robert Christgau	(1-star Honorable Mention)
NME	8/10
Rolling Stone	4/5 stars

The Wolf That House Built is the debut album of Little Axe, released in 1994 by Wired Recordings. The album was re-issued as a digital download in 2014 featuring additional tracks.

== Accolades ==
Publication	Country	Accolade	Year	Rank
Mojo	United Kingdom	Albums of the Year	1995	14

== Track listing ==
All tracks are written by Skip McDonald and Adrian Sherwood, except where noted.

No.	Title	Writer(s)	Length
1.	"Ride On (Fight On)"	Huddie Ledbetter, Skip McDonald, Adrian Sherwood	5:22
2.	"The Time Has Come"	Skip McDonald, Adrian Sherwood, Doug Wimbish	5:04
3.	"Out in the Rain and Cold"	Skip McDonald, Adrian Sherwood, Doug Wimbish	4:37
4.	"Back to the Crossroads"		6:36
5.	"Never Turn Back" (parts 1 & 2)	Alan Lomax, Skip McDonald, Adrian Sherwood	7:19
6.	"Another Sinful Day"		4:06
7.	"Crossfire"		4:29
8.	"Wolf's Story"		7:01
9.	"Hear My Cry"	Skip McDonald, Adrian Sherwood, Doug Wimbish	4:22
10.	"Dayton"		6:12
11.	"Falling Down"		4:28
12.	"Wake the Town"		3:55

== Personnel ==
Musicians

- Saz Bell – vocals
- Kevin Gibbs – vocals
- Keith LeBlanc – drums
- Skip McDonald – vocals, guitar, keyboards, bass guitar, programming, producer
- Talvin Singh – tabla, percussion
- Doug Wimbish – bass guitar

Technical personnel

- Paul Beckett – engineering
- Alan Branch – engineering
- Dave Pine – engineering
- Adrian Sherwood – producer
- Frédéric Voisin – illustrations

== Release history ==
Region	Date	Label	Format	Catalog
United Kingdom	1994	Wired Recordings	CD	WIRED 27
United States	1994	Okeh/Epic	CD	7464-64254-2
