= Bought for a Dollar, Sold for a Dime =

Studio album by Little Axe
- Released: June 7, 2010
- Recorded: Real World Studios, Wiltshire, England
- Genre: Blues; dub
- Length: 58:55
- Label: Real World
- Producer: Skip McDonald, Adrian Sherwood

Little Axe chronology
Stone Cold Ohio (2006)	Bought for a Dollar, Sold for a Dime (2010)	If You Want Loyalty Buy a Dog (2011)

Professional ratings
Review scores
Source	Rating
Mojo	4/5 stars

Bought for a Dollar, Sold for a Dime is the sixth album by Little Axe, released on June 7, 2010, by Real World Records. The album was originally issued as in demo form as digital download in May 2008.

== Track listing ==
No.	Title	Writer(s)	Length
1.	"Guide My Feet"	Skip McDonald	0:56
2.	"Soul of a Man"	Skip McDonald, Adrian Sherwood	4:14
3.	"Grinning"	Skip McDonald	3:27
4.	"Take a Stroll"	Keith LeBlanc, Skip McDonald	3:59
5.	"Hands Off"	Skip McDonald	0:51
6.	"Can't Sleep"	Skip McDonald	5:19
7.	"Hammerhead"	Skip McDonald, Adrian Sherwood	5:22
8.	"Can't Stop Walking Yet"	Keith LeBlanc, Skip McDonald	5:55
9.	"Hear Me Cry"	Skip McDonald	5:37
10.	"Too Late"	Skip McDonald, Adrian Sherwood	5:30
11.	"Another Friend Gone"	Skip McDonald, Adrian Sherwood	5:55
12.	"Tell Me Why"	Skip McDonald	6:18
13.	"Return"	Skip McDonald	4:42
14.	"When the Sun Goes Down"	Skip McDonald	0:50

2008 digital download
No.	Title	Writer(s)	Length
1.	"Take a Stroll"	Keith LeBlanc, Skip McDonald	4:19
2.	"Soul of Man"	Skip McDonald, Adrian Sherwood	4:20
3.	"Hammerhead"	Skip McDonald, Adrian Sherwood	5:24
4.	"Can't Stop Walking"	Keith LeBlanc, Skip McDonald	6:02
5.	"Come Back Home"	Skip McDonald	4:45
6.	"Temptation"		5:52
7.	"Can't Sleep at Night"	Skip McDonald	5:42
8.	"2 Late"	Skip McDonald, Adrian Sherwood	5:31
9.	"Another Friend"	Skip McDonald, Adrian Sherwood	6:05

== Personnel ==
Musicians

- The Crispy Horns – brass
- Richard Doswell – saxophone
- Bernard Fowler – vocals (2–4, 8, 10, 13)
- Dave Fullwood – trumpet
- Alan Glen – harmonica
- Keith LeBlanc – drums (2, 4, 6–8, 11)
- Skip McDonald – guitar, producer, vocals (2, 7, 9, 11, 12, 14)
- Chris Petter – trombone
- Doug Wimbish – bass guitar

Additional musicians

- Cyril Atef – drums (6)
- Sas Bell – vocals (1, 11, 14)
- Ken Boothe – vocals (6)
- Madeline Edgehill – vocals (11)
- Kevin Gibbs – vocals (1, 11, 14)
- Hugh Marsh – violin (12)
- Andy Pask – bass guitar (12)
- Valerie Skeete – vocals (11)
- Daby Touré – vocals (12)

Technical personnel

- Marco Migliari – engineering
- Adrian Sherwood – producer

== Release history ==
Region	Date	Label	Format	Catalog
United Kingdom	2010	Real World	CD	CDRW178
