= Bim Sherman =

Jamaican musician and singer-songwriter

- Born: Jarret Lloyd Vincent; 12 February 1950
- Origin: Westmoreland, Jamaica
- Died: 17 November 2000 (aged 50) London, England
- Genres: Roots Reggae, Dub

Jarret Lloyd Vincent (12 February 1950 – 17 November 2000), better known by one of his stage aliases Bim Sherman (others include Jarrett Tomlinson, Jarrett Vincent, Lloyd Vincent, J. L. Vincent, and Lloyd Tomlinson), was a Jamaican musician and singer-songwriter.

== Biography ==
Rooted in profoundly spiritual reggae, his music developed in later years in many directions, combining influences from all around the world, notably India. Sherman was also hailed as "reggae's sweetest voice". In the mid-1970s, he recorded a series of spiritual roots and dub tunes in Jamaica, backed by Lloyd Parks Skin Flesh and Bones band, Soul Syndicate and Sly and Robbie. Notably, Bim Sherman also provided backing vocals on Dr Alimantado's Born for a Purpose, a record which introduced British punk rockers to reggae when John Lydon played the discomix on Capital Radio whilst in The Sex Pistols.

Sherman also recorded a number of cover versions of standard blues and Rhythm and blues tunes, as well as incorporating elements of hymn and folk-rooted melodies into his compositions, such as his take on the 19th century hymn, When The Roll Is Called Up Yonder, referencing The Book of Life, and Wings of a Dove, lyrically based on the King James Bible version of Psalm 55:6. He also recorded versions of Valley of Tears, made famous by Fats Domino, and Bewildered, a standard popularised by Mickey and Sylvia, Skiffle guitarist Lonnie Donegan, Doo Wop artists The Ink Spots, jump blues singer Amos Milburn and James Brown. On his solo album, Across the Red Sea, Bim Sherman also recorded Just Like A King, his take on Stranger Cole and Gladstone Anderson's Rocksteady tune, Just Like a River, featuring Undivided Roots and Lovers Rock artist Don Campbell (musician) on drums.

Sylvia Robinson of Mickey and Sylvia later became known for her work as founder and CEO of the hip hop label Sugar Hill Records. Robinson is credited as the driving force behind two landmark singles in the hip hop genre: Rapper's Delight (1979) by the Sugarhill Gang, and The Message by Grandmaster Flash and the Furious Five, both of which she produced. Bim Sherman went on to work with members of The Sugarhill Gang later in his career in the 1980s when he diversified his sound after the death of Prince Far I.

In 1981, Bim Sherman also did a re-working of The Abyssinians Satta Massagana composition ( the title of which translates from the Amharic language "አመሰገነ" as "Thank you" ) with only the dub version released by New Age Steppers and Creation Rebel on the Threat to Creation album under the title of Ethos Design. The album was recorded at The Manor Studio and Berry Street Studio. The drumming was provided by Eskimo Fox, who had been trained at the renowned Alpha Boys' School, the academy led and mentored by Sister Mary Ignatius Davies, recognised as a major factor in the strength of Alpha's programme and that of Jamaican music more broadly.

Bim Sherman later moved to London where, as part of the post-punk reggae infatuation, he made a name for himself recording with Adrian Sherwood's On-U Sound label. He became part of various musical collectives associated with On-U Sound, such as New Age Steppers alongside Ari Up, (formerly of The Slits) and Neneh Cherry, (step-daughter of Don Cherry), and Bruce Smith ( son of avant-garde modernist artist Hassel Smith, now drummer with Public Image Ltd ) , Singers & Players, with Congo Ashanti Roy, and the late Prince Far-I alongside Dub Syndicate.

In 1993, Bim Sherman formed the Justice League of Zion project, with Rastafari chanters Sister Tembeka (who also held a community role managing stalls and cultural artifacts at Jah Shaka dances) and Sister Tandeka, with whom he recorded two albums, a vocal entitled Discoverers, followed by a dub showcase, Discoverers (Part 2 Dubwise). Both were released on Sherman's Century Records label, with Sister Tembeka's Dubplate version of the Discoverers album track Hallelujah getting play on Jah Shaka's sound system.

Sherman also worked consistently throughout his career with renowned veteran foundation horns player Headley Bennett( who had gained a reputation from decades of work at Coxsone Dodd's Studio One and from playing with The Revolutionaries at Maxwell Avenue Channel One Studios), Style Scott of the Roots Radics and Jah Woosh, as well as releasing work with Mad Professor, Crucial Tony Philips and Carlton "Bubblers" Ogilvie, both prolific composers, producers and sound engineers from the UK reggae bands Creation Rebel, Ruff Cutt and Undivided Roots.

Sherman's Devious Woman track, recorded with Singers & Players and Keith Levene of The Clash and John Lydon's Public Image Ltd, featured on the soundtrack of Richard Hell's film, Smithereens in 1982, the dub version of which was released by New Age Steppers and Creation Rebel on the Threat to Creation album, and in 1983, Sherman released music on the Jah Shaka label, producing the Happiness vocal and dub discomix.

In 1989, Sherman recut "It Must be a Dream" (originally recorded with Prince Jammy for Jah Woosh's record label) for WAU! Mr. Modo Recordingsand Sound Iration, engineered by Nick Manasseh. In 1992, he recut the Niney the Observer and Freddie McGregor tune, "We Need More Love (In The Ghetto)" for The Groove Corporation, who were an ambient and drum and bass collective made up of previous members of Rockers Hi-Fi and Electribe 101.

Sherman also featured on Clear with the track "Sleepyhead", released on 3 April 1995 by 4th & B'way Records, a subsidiary of Chris Blackwell's Island Records and a sister label Def Jam Recordings. Sherman also recorded a handful of solo reggae LPs. Towards the end of his life, Sherman took a whole new musical direction. He went to India and re-recorded his 1970s roots tunes alongside a full Indian classical orchestra in Bombay, creating his LP, Miracle (1996). This opened Sherman up to an entire new audience. It Must Be a Dream, an entire remix of Miracle was released with dance mixes by top UK DJs, followed by another notable Indian/reggae crossover LP What Happened?

Sherman was diagnosed with cancer and died at the age of 50 in November 2000, within weeks of his diagnosis. He received an obituary in The Times, a rare accolade for an underground reggae singer.

== Discography ==
=== Albums ===
Year	Title
1979	Lovers Leap Showcase
1978	Love Forever
1982	Across the Red Sea
1984	Danger
1988	Ghetto Dub
1989	Exploitation
1990	Matrix Dub
1990	Too Hot
1991	Got to Move Pt. 2
1992	Crazy World
1996	Miracle
1997	It Must Be a Dream
1998	What Happened?
2002	The Need to Live

=== Singles ===
Year	Title
1975	Tribulation
1975	Golden Stool
1975	Valley of Tears
1975	100 Years
1975	Trying
1976	My Bretheren
1977	Mighty Ruler
1977	Ever Firm
1979	Golden Locks / Tribulation
1979	Lightning and Thunder
1979	My Woman
1979	Love Jah Only
1983	Happiness / Exile Dub
1989	The Power
1993	Winey Winey
1996	Solid As a Rock
1996	Bewildered
1997	It Must Be a Dream
1997	Can I Be Free from Crying
1998	Earth People
1998	Heaven
