= Carlton and The Shoes =

Jamaican vocal group

- Genres: Reggae
- Label: Studio One
- Members: Carlton Manning; Donald Manning; Alexander Henry
- Past members: Lynford Manning

Carlton and The Shoes (sometimes credited as Carlton & His Shoes) are a Jamaican vocal group who had their greatest success in the late 1960s as rocksteady gradually became reggae and were still active in 2008, most notably in Japan and Jamaica. The group had several Studio One recorded hits in Jamaica, most notably "Love Me Forever" in 1968.

The group is led by Carlton Manning, and the line-up was originally completed by his younger brothers Donald and Lynford (both members of The Abyssinians), and Alexander Henry. Manning originally named the group Carlton and his Shades, but a printer's mistake on their debut release (for Sonia Pottinger) led to the "Shoes" name sticking. Although their debut release made little impact, they moved on to work with Clement "Coxsone" Dodd at Studio One, where they enjoyed a massive rocksteady hit with "Love Me Forever".

"Love Me Forever" has been re-released and covered many times since, and the single's B-side, "Happy Land", formed the basis for The Abyssinians' "Satta Massagana", one of the most covered songs in the history of reggae. When Donald and Lynford formed The Abyssinians, Carlton remained at Studio One, continuing to make records and working as a session guitarist. He continued to record through the 1970s and early 1980s, though never repeated his early success.

Lynford Manning died on 25 June 2024.

== Albums ==
- Love Me Forever (1978 - Studio One)
- This Heart of Mine (1982 - Quality Records)
- Sweet Feeling (1996 - Overheat Records)
