= Never Trust a Hippy (Adrian Sherwood album) =

Studio album by Adrian Sherwood
- Released: 25 February 2003
- Recorded: On-U Sound Studios and Real World Studios, UK
- Genre: Electro, dub
- Length: 57:44
- Label: Real World
- Producer: Adrian Sherwood

Adrian Sherwood chronology
The English Disease (1989)	Never Trust a Hippy (2003)	Becoming a Cliché (2006)

Professional ratings
Review scores
Source	Rating
AllMusic	3/5 stars
Robert Christgau	(2-star Honorable Mention)
Entertainment Weekly	B+
Mojo	4/5 stars

Adrian Sherwood feat. Shara Nelson - Hari Up Hari (2003)

Never Trust a Hippy (or NTAH) is the first solo album by Adrian Sherwood. It was released on Peter Gabriel's Real World Records label. It includes guest performances by Sly Dunbar and Robbie Shakespeare and S. E. Rogie (sampled from the title track of the album Dead Men Don't Smoke Marijuana). The album also contains Sherwood's remix of the track "Paradise of Nada" by Rizwan Muazzam Qawwali and Temple of Sound.

The song "Hari Up Hari", featuring vocals by Shara Nelson, was released as a single.

== Track listing ==
No.	Title	Writer(s)	Length
1.	"No Dog Jazz"	Adrian Sherwood	4:54
2.	"Hari Up Hari"	Steven "Lenky" Marsden, Adrian Sherwood	5:09
3.	"Haunted by Your Love"	Adrian Sherwood	4:08
4.	"X-Plantation"	Adrian Sherwood	5:16
5.	"Strange Turn"	Adrian Sherwood	5:30
6.	"Dead Man Smoking"	S. E. Rogie, Adrian Sherwood	3:55
7.	"Paradise of Nada"	Count Dubulah, Rizwan Mujahid Ali Khan, Adrian Sherwood, Neil Sparkes	7:52
8.	"Boogaloo"	Adrian Sherwood	5:19
9.	"Processed World"	Steven "Lenky" Marsden, Adrian Sherwood	5:11
10.	"The Ignorant Version"	Carlton "Bubblers" Ogilvie, Adrian Sherwood	5:15
11.	"Majestic 12"	Nick Coplowe, Adrian Sherwood	5:11

== Personnel ==
Musicians

- Harry Beckett – trumpet
- Crucial Tony – guitar (4)
- Sly Dunbar – drums (3, 5)
- Ghetto Priest – vocals (6)
- Emily Sherwood Hyman – vocals (10)
- Jazzwad – keyboards (1, 4, 8), bass guitar (1, 4, 8), drum machine (1, 4, 8)
- Hariharan – vocals (2, 9)
- Keith LeBlanc – drums (6, 11)
- Steven "Lenky" Marsden – drums (2, 9)
- Skip McDonald – guitar (1–3, 5–11)
- Michael Mondesir – bass guitar (8)
- Simon Mundey – sequencer (4), bass guitar (4)
- Bonjo Iyabinghi Noah – percussion (11)
- Carlton "Bubblers" Ogilvie – piano (1, 3, 5, 6, 8), bass guitar (6, 10), vocals (10), drums (10)
- Rizwan-Muazzam Qawwali – vocals (7)
- S. E. Rogie – vocals (6)
- Robert "Robbie" Shakespeare – bass guitar (3, 5)
- Denise Sherwood – vocals (9, 10)
- Temple of Sound – bass guitar (7), percussion (7)
- Sorra Wilson-Dickson – violin (6)

Technical personnel

- Nick Coplowe – engineering, keyboards (1), bass guitar (1)
- Paul Grady – mixing, recording
- Kevin Metcalfe – mastering
- Adrian Sherwood – producer

== Release history ==
Region	Date	Label	Format	Catalog
United Kingdom	2003	Real World	CD	CDRW110
United Kingdom	2003	Real World	LP	LPRW 110
United States	2003	Real World, Virgin	CD	70876 17640 2 4
Japan	2003	Real World	CD	VJCP-68426
United Kingdom	2012	Real World	CD	CDRWG110
