= Kevin Porée =

Irish/British musician

Kevin Porée (born 11 February 1965) is an Irish/British record producer, songwriter, composer, arranger and recording engineer. He is best known for his work with Mark Hole, Paul Young, Dr. Feelgood), Wilko Johnson, Cockney Rejects, Brian McFadden, Los Pacaminos, Sulo, Breathless, Senser, Larz-Kristerz, Cheryl Baker, Kikki Danielsson, Joy Tobing, Hiding in Public, George Stiles and Anthony Drewe, Charlotte Gordon Cumming and for his associations with the composer / arranger Matheson Bayley and the South African producer Neal Snyman.

Born on the Channel Island of Jersey, Porée attended Douai School from 1978–1983, and achieved a first class degree and an MA from the University of Kent at Canterbury. He initially pursued an academic career, working as a university lecturer at the University of Kent, London University Royal Holloway College, and City University, London, in the fields of theatre studies, communication theory and popular arts.

Working as a musician and producer in the late 1980s and early 1990s, Porée took over Berry Street Studio in London in 1993, and used it as a base for his production work as well as running it as a commercial recording studio until the studio closed in 2014.
