= Slow Fuse =

Studio album by Little Axe
- Released: September 30, 1996
- Genre: Blues; dub
- Length: 54:24
- Label: Wired
- Producer: Skip McDonald, Adrian Sherwood

Little Axe chronology
The Wolf that House Built (1994)	Slow Fuse (1996)	Hard Grind (2002)

Professional ratings
Review scores
Source	Rating
Allmusic	3/5 stars
Muzik	2.5/5 stars

Slow Fuse is the second album by Little Axe, released on September 30, 1996 by Wired Recordings. The album was re-issued as a digital download in 2014 featuring additional tracks.

== Track listing ==
All tracks are written by Skip McDonald and Adrian Sherwood, except "Too Late" by Willie Dixon.

No.	Title	Length
1.	"Blue"	2:10
2.	"On the Beat Sound"	3:44
3.	"Storm Is Rising"	5:12
4.	"Black Diamond Train"	4:12
5.	"Short Fuse"	5:09
6.	"Going Down Slow"	3:56
7.	"Must Have Been the Devil"	4:45
8.	"People Do"	5:14
9.	"Amber"	2:13
10.	"Chains"	3:40
11.	"Return"	5:21
12.	"Too Late"	5:04
13.	"Speak Easy"	3:44

Limited edition bonus CD
No.	Title	Length
1.	"On the Beat Sound"	4:37
2.	"Storm Is Rising"	4:24
3.	"Too Late"	5:33
4.	"Going Down Slow"	4:51
5.	"Lift Off"	5:23
6.	"Falling Down"	6:05
7.	"Must Have Been the Devil"	5:24
8.	"Judgement"	5:13
9.	"Fallen Grace"	5:18
10.	"On the Beat Sound"	4:37

== Personnel ==
Musicians

- Saz Bell – vocals
- Scott Firth – bass guitar
- Bernard Fowler – vocals
- Kevin Gibbs – vocals
- Alan Glen – harmonica
- Keith LeBlanc – drums
- Skip McDonald – vocals, guitar, keyboards, producer
- Tom McManamon – banjo, mandolin
- Talvin Singh – tabla
- Doug Wimbish – bass guitar

Technical personnel

- Adrian Sherwood – producer

== Release history ==
Region	Date	Label	Format	Catalog
United Kingdom	1996	Wired Recordings	CD	74321 40307 2
United Kingdom	1996	Wired Recordings	CD	WIRED 0233
