= Zap Pow =

Jamaican reggae band

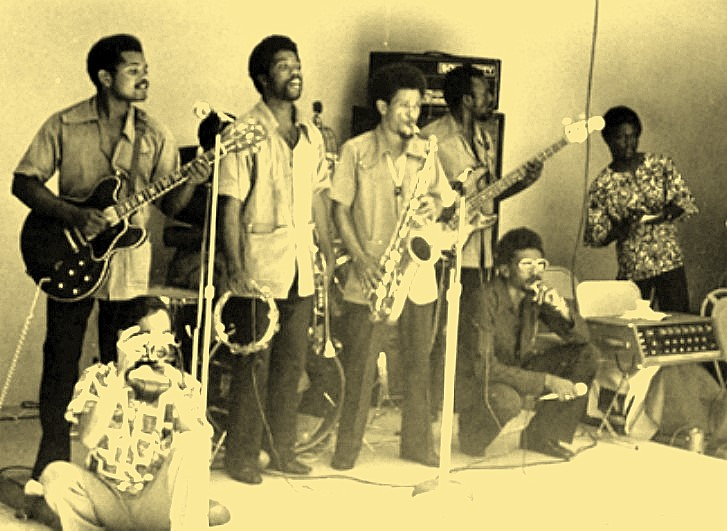
- Jazz and reggae concert on the street in Spanish Town, Jamaica (1979)

Background information
- Origin: Kingston, Jamaica
- Genres: Reggae
- Years active: 1969–1979, 2016–present
- Labels: Trojan, Island, VP
- Members: Dwight Pinkney; Glen DaCosta; Lebert "Gibby" Morrison; Richard "T Bird" Johnson; Lando Bolt; Everol Wray; Geoffrey Forrest; Fiona
- Past members: Max Edwards; Mike Williams; Joe McCormack; David Madden; Beres Hammond; Danny McFarlane; Larry McDonald; Cornell Marshall; Winston "King" Cole; Prilly Hamilton; Bunny Rugs; Jacob Miller

Zap Pow is a Jamaican reggae band, founded by singer/bassist Michael Williams aka Mikey Zappow and guitarist Dwight Pinkney. Members also included singer Beres Hammond, trumpeter David Madden, saxman Glen DaCosta, and drummer Cornell Marshall. They originally existed from 1969 to 1979; they re-formed in 2016.

== History ==
The band was formed in 1969, by musicians Michael Williams (bass, guitar, vocals, songwriter, former drummer of Bobby Aitken's Caribbeats),) and Dwight Pinkney (guitar, vocals, formerly of The Sharks and guitarist on a 1966 session by The Wailers), Max Edwards (drums), Glen DaCosta (tenor saxophone, vocals, flute, a former pupil at Alpha Boys School), Joe McCormack (trombone), and David Madden (trumpet, vocals, another former pupil at Alpha Boys School, who had previously recorded with Cedric Brooks under the name 'I'm and Dave'). Pinkney and Williams had previously played together in the band Winston Turner & the Untouchables. The band's name came from a comic book that Williams had read. Several singles were released in 1970-71 including the hit "This is Reggae Music", and in 1971 their debut album, Revolutionary Zap Pow, was released on the Harry J label.

In 1975, Beres Hammond joined as lead singer (other singers with the band included Winston "King" Cole, Milton "Prilly" Hamilton, Bunny Rugs and Jacob Miller), and their Tommy Cowan-produced 1976 album, Zap Pow Now topped the reggae chart in the UK. Trojan Records issued Revolution in the same year. Edwards left in 1977, to be replaced by Cornell Marshall. The band split up in 1979 with Hammond going on to a successful solo career. Pinkney went on to play with Roots Radics, and Edwards also pursued a solo career. Williams recorded and performed solo as Mikey Zappow. The horn section of DaCosta, McCormack and Madden were regularly used in recording sessions for other artists including Bob Marley & the Wailers, and they also recorded prolifically as individual session musicians, often being used by Lee "Scratch" Perry for sessions at his Black Ark studio. Madden went on to release solo albums, as did DaCosta.

Williams died in 2005, aged 61. In 2007 the band were honoured at the Prime Minister's Gala on Jamaican Independence Day.

Pinkney and DaCosta re-formed Zap Pow in 2016, and by 2017 the band also included Lebert "Gibby" Morrison (bass), Richard "T Bird" Johnson (keyboards), Lando Bolt (drums), Everol Wray (trumpet), and singers Geoffrey Forrest and Fiona. They recorded a new album, Zap Pow Again, released in October 2017.

== Discography ==
=== Albums ===
- Revolutionary Zap Pow (1971), Harry J
- Zap Pow Now (1976), Vulcan
- Revolution (1976), Trojan
- Zap Pow (1978), Island
- Zap Pow Again (2017), VP

=== Compilation albums ===
- Beres Hammond Meets Zappow in Jamaica, Rhino
- Jungle Beat, Lagoon
- Love Hits, LMS
- Reggae Rules, Rhino
- Revolution (the best of) (2007), Trojan
