= New Holland (band) =

- Origin: Bellville, South Africa
- Genres: Indie rock, pop, electronic
- Years active: 2007–present
- Labels: Rhythm Records
- Members: TeeJay Terblanche; Gerdus Oosthuizen; Buckle Boy; Odendaal Esterhuyse
- Website: Official Website

New Holland is an indie rock band originating from South Africa.

== History ==
=== 01 ===
The band recorded their debut album, 01, in March 2008 with engineer Jurgen von Wechmar at Sunset Studios. 2008 also saw New Holland tour along with the Ubuntoer: Rock Against Racism, as well as feature on MK's Studio 1 show.

=== Exploded Views ===
New Holland's second album, Exploded Views, was recorded at vocalist TeeJay's recording studio, CoffeeStainedVinyl, and produced by internationally acclaimed recording engineer Neal Snyman.

Before the release of the album, the band made the first single, 'Something To Believe In', available for free download from their record label's site.

Exploded Views was released on 21 September 2009 followed by a South African tour in October.

== Members ==
- TeeJay Terblanche (vocals, rhythm guitar, synth)
- Gerdus Oosthuizen (backing vocals, lead guitar, synth)
- Buckle Boy (bass)
- Odendaal Esterhuyse (drums)

== Discography ==
=== Albums ===
- 01 (2008)
- Exploded Views (2009)

=== Compilations ===
- Bellville Rock City (2009)

== Music videos ==
- "Shine" - directed by 187 Pictures
- "Uhuru" - directed by Natasja Fourie
- "Something To Believe In" - directed by Morgan Dingle
- "Freedom" - Directed by 187 Pictures
