= Singers & Players =

- Origin: Jamaica and England
- Genres: Reggae, Dub music,
- Years active: 1981–1988
- Labels: On-U Sound Records; Situation Two

Singers & Players were a reggae collective made up of vocalists and musicians associated with Adrian Sherwood's On-U Sound Records. They recorded five albums between 1981 and 1988.

Including artists such as Bim Sherman, Style Scott, Don Campbell (musician), Roots Radics, Roydel Johnson, better known as Congo Ashanti Roy from the band The Congos and Ras Michael's Sons of Negus, George Oban, who had previously played with Burning Spear and Aswad, Errol Flabba Holt, Headley Bennett, Jah Woosh, Keith Levene, Steely of Steely & Clevie, Prince Far I and Mikey Dread they were regarded as a dub music supergroup. There was never any fixed line up to the group, and many different artists featured on each track and each album. The artwork and sleeve-designs were usually provided by noted photographer, Kishi Yamamoto.

The band's third album, Staggering Heights, received a four-star rating from Record Collector.

== Discography ==
=== Albums ===
- War of Words (1981)
- Revenge of the Underdog (1982)
- Staggering Heights (1983)
- Leaps and Bounds (1984)
- Vacuum Pumping (1988)
- Golden Greats Volume 1 (1989)
- Golden Greats Volume 2 (1995)

=== Details ===
==== War of Words ====
War of Words was the first album by Singers & Players. It was released in the U.S. on 99 Records in November 1981 and then in the U.K. on On-U Sound Records in August 1982. It was produced by Adrian Sherwood and engineered by Dennis Bovell, John Walker, Nobby Turner, Richard Manwaring and Steve Smith.

===== Track listing =====
Side One

1. "Devious Women" (Jarrett Tomlinson)
2. "Quante Jubila" (Michael Williams, Antonio Phillips)
3. "Sit and Wonder" (Jarrett Tomlinson)
4. "Fit To Survive" (Jarrett Tomlinson)

Side Two

1. "Reaching The Bad Man" (Adrian Maxwell, Jarrett Tomlinson)
2. "World of Dispentation" (Jarrett Tomlinson)
3. "91 Vibrations" (Adrian Maxwell, Jarrett Tomlinson)

==== Staggering Heights ====
Staggering Heights was the group's third album. It was released in July 1983 on On-U Sound Records, and was produced by Adrian Sherwood.

===== Track listing =====
Side One

1. "African Blood" (Roydel Johnson)
2. "Bedward The Flying Preacher" (Michael Williams)
3. "Snipers in the Streets" (Roydel Johnson)
4. "A Matter of Time" (Jarrett Tomlinson)

Side Two

1. "School Days" (Mikey Dread)
2. "Socca" (Jarrett Tomlinson)
3. "Autobiography" (Michael Williams)
4. "This Assembly" (Desmond "Fatfingers" Coke)

== Band personnel and collaborators ==
- Bim Sherman - vocals
- Prince Far I - vocals
- Antonio "Crucial Tony" Phillips - bass, guitar, keyboards, vocals
- Jah Woosh - vocals
- Don Campbell (musician)
- Charles "Eskimo Fox" Kelly - drums, percussion, backing vocals
- George Oban - bass
- Keith Levene - guitar
- Keith "Lizard" Logan - bass, vocals
- Veral "Mr. Ranking Magoo" Rose - percussion
- Ari "Stepper" Up - keyboards
- Clifton "Bigga" Morrison - keyboards
- Peter "Doctor Pablo" Stroud - keyboards
- Nick Plytas - keyboards
- Lincoln "Style" Scott - drums
- Mikey Dread - vocals
- "Congo Ashanti" Roy Johnson - vocals, percussion, guitar
- Errol "Flabba" Holt - bass
- Eric "Bingy Bunny" Lamont - guitar
- Bloodvessel - guitar
- Dwight Pinkney - guitar
- Martin "Frederex" Harrison - guitar
- Carlton "Bubblers" Ogilvie - keyboards
- Akabu (Vyris Edghill & Valerie Skeete) - backing vocals
