= Creation Rebel =

Compilation album by Burning Spear
- Released: 2004
- Genre: Reggae
- Length: 56:22
- Label: Heartbeat Records
- Producer: Clement Dodd

Professional ratings
Review scores
Source	Rating
AllMusic	4/5 stars
Robert Christgau	A−
Pop Matters	9/10

Creation Rebel is a 2004 compilation album by reggae artist Burning Spear.

== Track listing ==
1. "Door Peeper"
2. "This Race"
3. "This Population"
4. "Bad to Worst"
5. "New Civilization"
6. "Pick Up The Pieces"
7. "Zion Higher"
8. "Swell Headed"
9. "Foggy Road"
10. "Creation Rebel"
11. "Ethiopians Live It Out"
12. "Rocking Time"
13. "Get Ready"
14. "What a Happy Day"
15. "Call on You"
16. "Free" (a.k.a. We Are Free)
17. "Down by the River" (a.k.a. Down by the Riverside)
18. "Weeping and Wailing"
19. "He Prayed"
20. "Rocking Time" (Original Single Mix)
21. "He Prayed / Joe Frazier" (Part 2) w/Dennis Alcapone (Single) - LP only
22. "Rocking Time / Pepper Rock w/Prince Jazzbo" (Single) - LP only

== Musician ==
- Winston Rodney – lead vocals, harmony vocals
- Fil Callender – drums, guitar
- Leroy "Horsemouth" Wallace – drums
- Boris Gardiner – bass
- Earl "Bagga" Walker – bass
- Leroy Sibbles – bass
- Carlton Manning – bass, guitar
- Eric Frater – guitar
- Patrick McDonald – guitar
- Albert Griffiths – guitar
- Ernest Ranglin – guitar
- Robbie Lyn – keyboards
- Richard Ace – keyboards
- Denzil Laing – percussion
- Enid Cumberland – percussion
- Cedric Brooks – horns
- David Madden – horns
- Vincent Gordon – horns
- Hedley Bennett – horns
- Jo Jo Bennett – horns
- Larry Marshall – harmony vocals (tracks 2 and 5)
- Rupert Willington – harmony vocals (tracks 1, 6, 7, 11 and 16)
- Al Campbell – harmony vocals (track 3)
- Clement Dodd – DJ (track 20)
