= The Abyssinians =

Jamaican roots reggae group

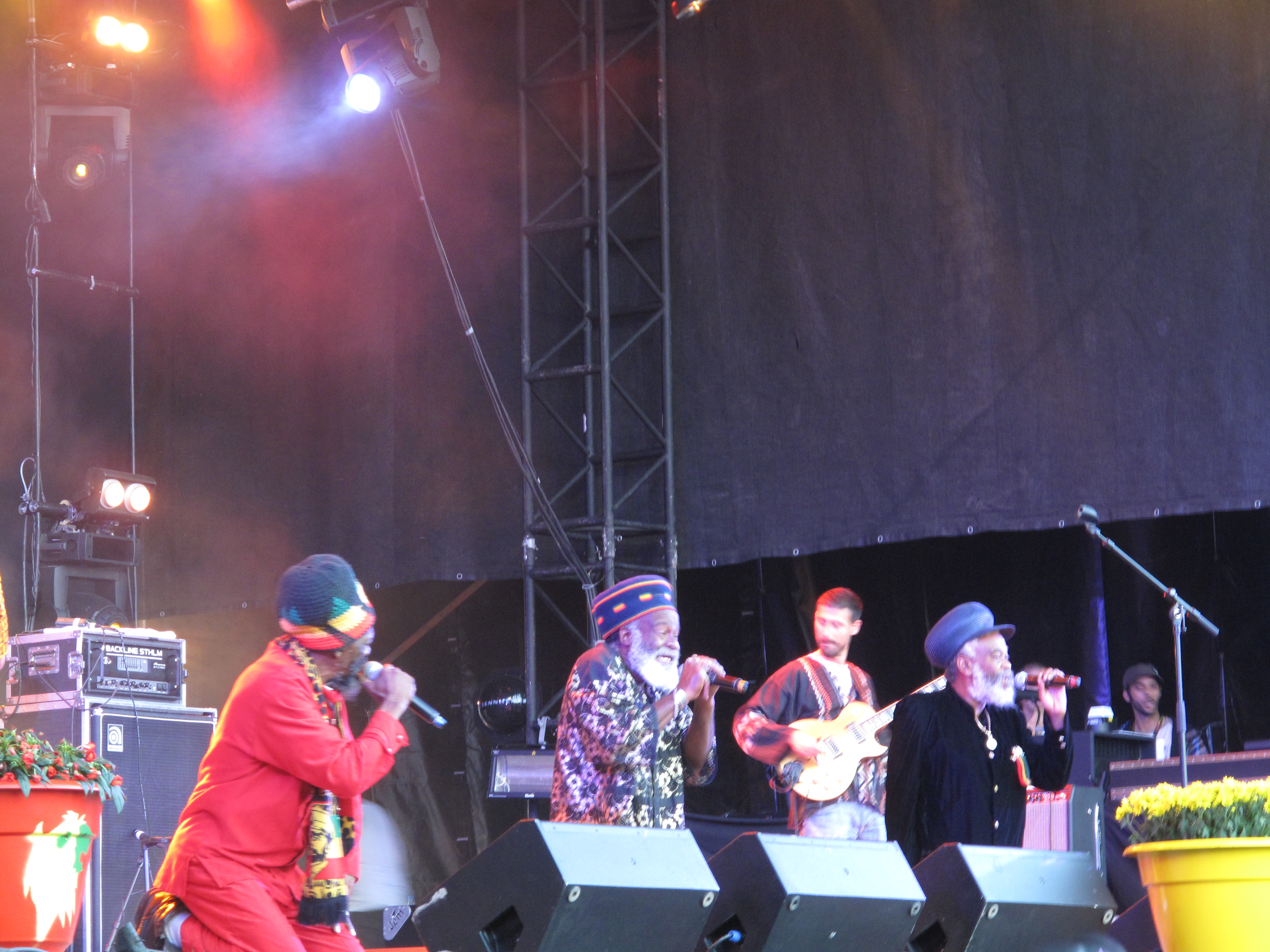
- Performing at the Uppsala Reggae Festival, 2010

Background information
- Origin: Jamaica
- Genres: Roots reggae
- Years active: 1969–present
- Past members: Bernard Collins; Donald Manning; Lynford Manning; Carlton Manning
- Website: Abyssiniansmusic.com

The Abyssinians are a Jamaican roots reggae group, famous for their close harmonies and promotion of the Rastafari movement in their lyrics.

== History ==
The vocal trio was originally formed in 1968 by Bernard Collins and Donald Manning. Their first song was "Satta Massagana", which was strongly influenced by Carlton Manning's "Happy Land". "Satta Massagana" is a Rastafarian hymn sung partly in the Ethiopian Amharic language. They recruited a third vocalist, who was still at school and often unable to attend rehearsals; he was soon replaced by Donald's brother Lynford Manning, who like Donald had previously been a member of their brother Carlton Manning's group Carlton and The Shoes.

"Satta Massagana" was first recorded for producer Clement "Coxsone" Dodd in March 1969, but he decided against releasing it, seeing no commercial potential for what he saw as a song constituting cultural subversion. In 1971, the group purchased the master tapes from Dodd for £90 and released it on their own Clinch label, the single becoming a massive success, prompting Dodd to release his own instrumental and deejay versions. The group released further takes on the song on Clinch by Tommy McCook, Big Youth, and Dillinger, as well as their own "Mabrak", featuring the group reciting passages from the Old Testament. It has since been recorded by dozens of artists. The group's second release, "Declaration of Rights", featured Leroy Sibbles on backing vocals, and like their first was a huge hit in Jamaica, (and subsequently in the international market) and has been covered several times since. Their 1973 single "Y Mas Gan" was similar to "Satta" in its use of Amharic.

The group continued to record throughout the 1970s for producers including Lloyd Daley, Tommy Cowan, and Geoffrey Chung, and their debut album, Forward on to Zion was produced by Clive Hunt and released in 1976. The follow-up, Arise (1978), was recorded under stressful conditions with internal rivalries threatening to break up the group, and after the album's release, Collins left the band, to be eventually replaced by Carlton Manning. This line-up performed at the 1979 Reggae Sunsplash festival, but split up the following year.

Donald Manning had a brief solo career in the early 1980s, in which he recorded as Donald Abyssinian.

Bernard Collins launched his own version of the group in the late 1980s, with two versions of the group existing for a time. The original line-up reunited in 1998 and went on to record new material, including the singles "African Princess" and "Swing Low" and the album Reunion, although Collins was not involved in songwriting at this time. Collins left again in 1999 and released material as Bernard Collins & the Abyssinians, releasing an album the same year.

The Abyssinians are credited on "Slave Song", from Sade's 2002 album, Lovers Live, which starts with a sample from the Abyssinians' song "African Race".

Lynford Manning died on 25 June 2024.

== Discography ==
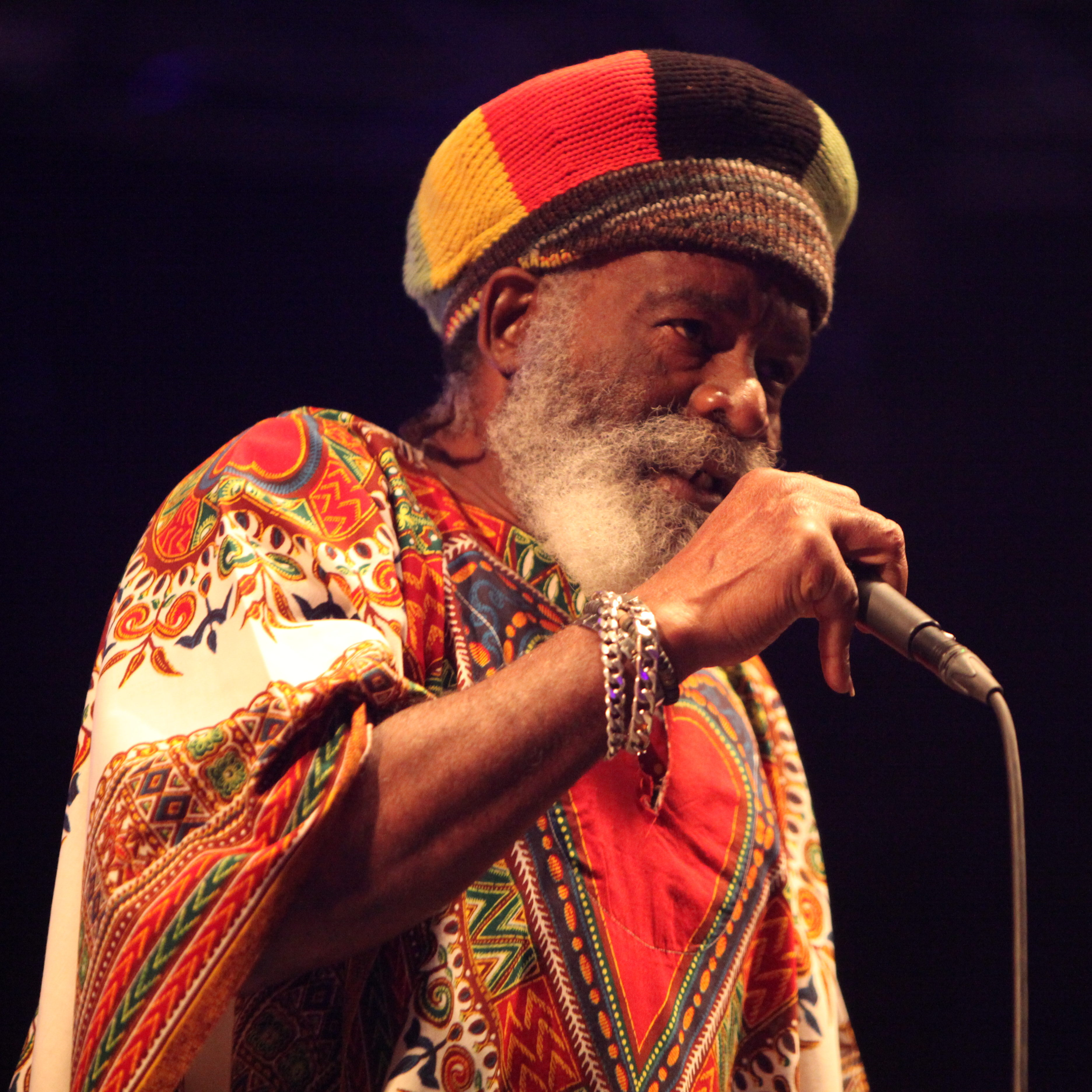
Bernard Collins

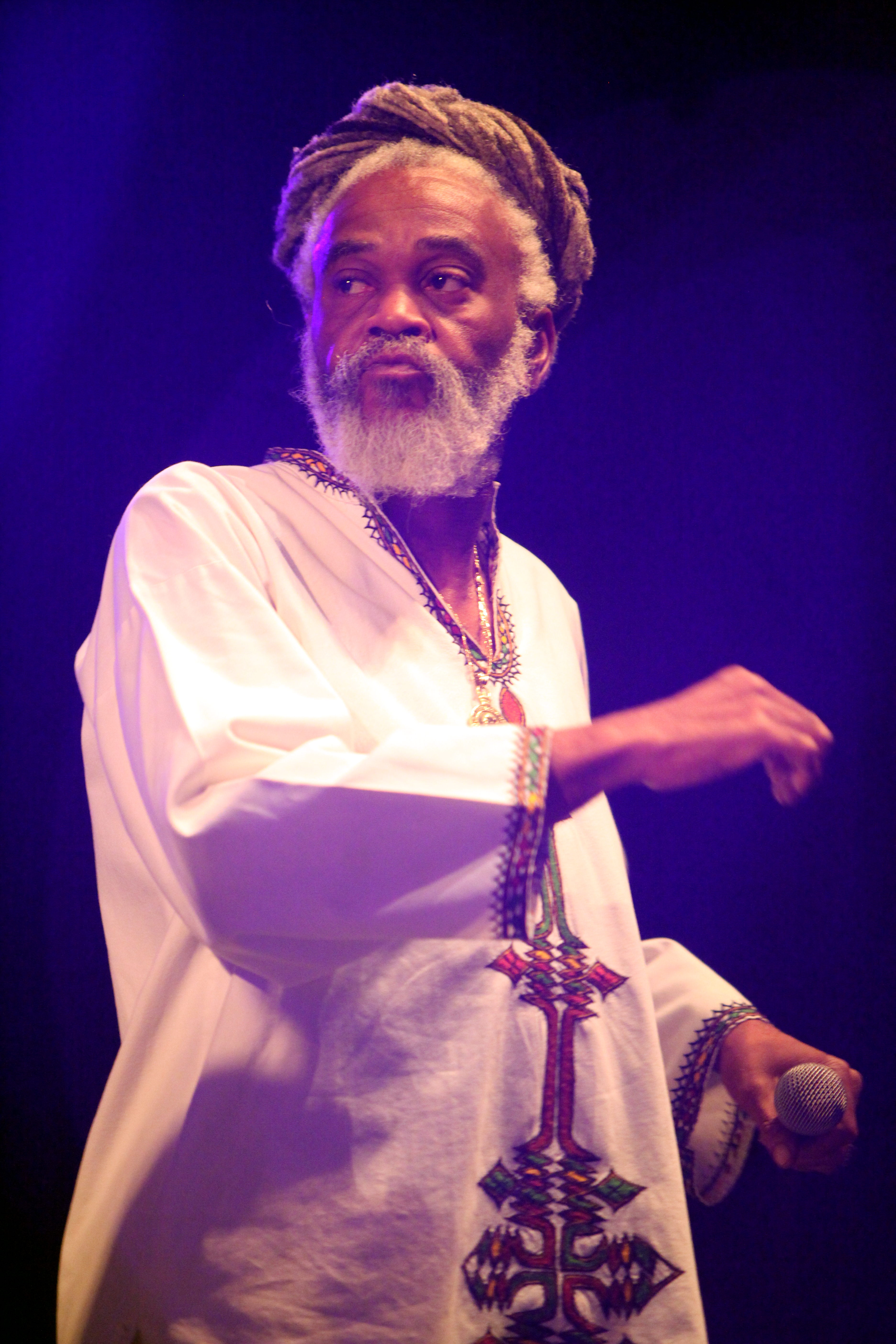
David Morrison

=== Studio albums ===
- 1976 : Satta Massagana - Jam Sounds (reissued 1988 on Clinch, 1993, 2007 on Heartbeat, also released as Satta and Forward on to Zion)
- 1978 : Arise - Tuff Gong/Virgin/Clinch
- 1982 : Forward - Aligator records (reissued 1988 on Clinch)
- 1998 : Reunion - Artists Only

=== Compilation albums ===
- 1982 : Forward - Alligator
- 1994 : Best of the Abyssinians - Musidisc
- 1996 : 19.95 + TAX
- 1998 : Satta Dub - Tabou 1
- 1998 : Declaration of Dub - Heartbeat
- 1999 : Last Days - Clinch (credited to Bernard Collins)
- 2003 : Abyssinians & Friends Tree of Satta vol. 1 - Blood & Fire

=== Live albums ===
- 2002 : Live in San Francisco - 2b1 II
