= Dwight Pinkney =

Jamaican guitarist

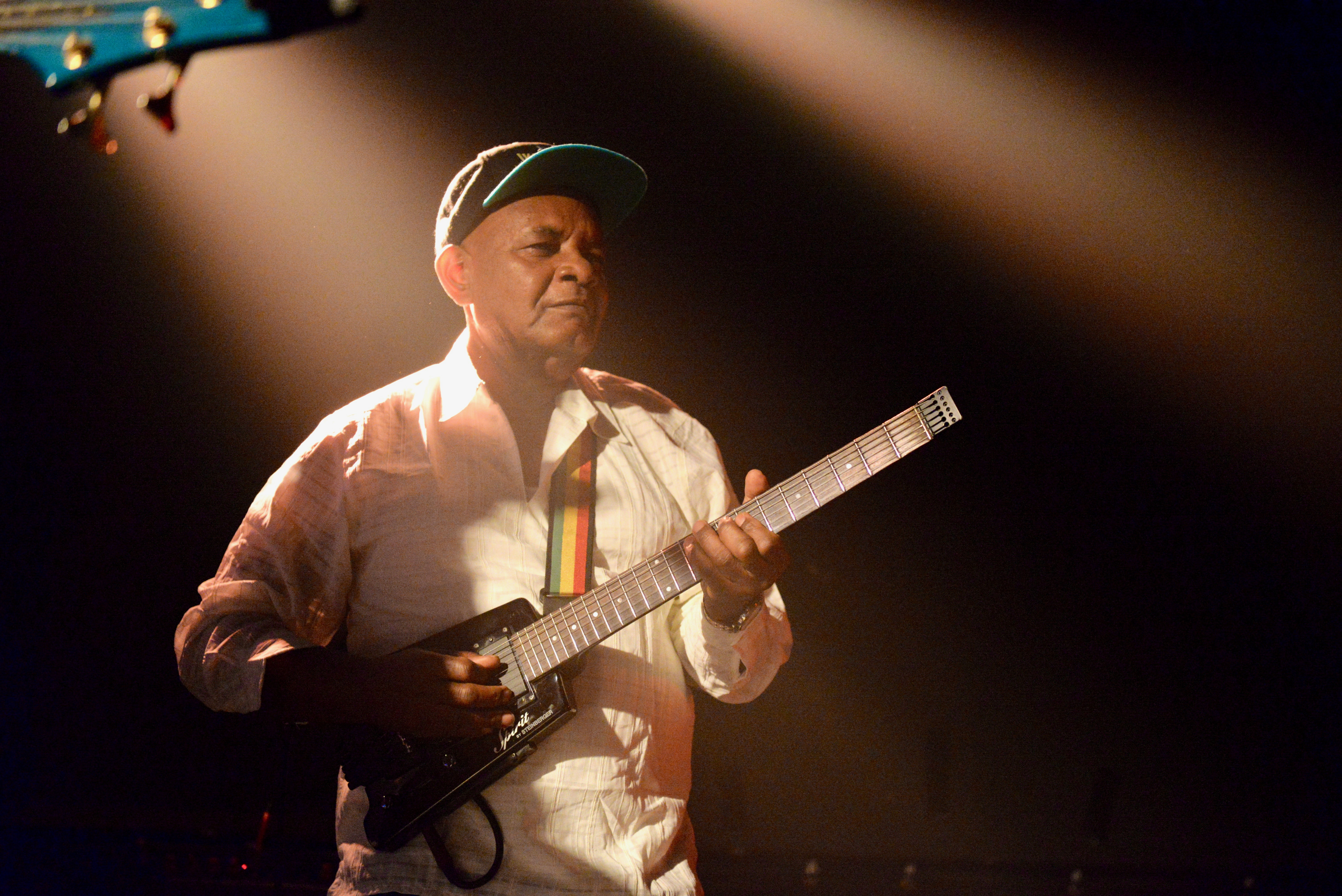
- Dwight Pinkney in concert in Antwerp in 2018

Background information
- Born: 1945 (age 80–81); Manchester Parish, Jamaica
- Genres: Ska, Rocksteady, Reggae
- Instrument: Guitar
- Years active: 1963 – present

Dwight Pinkney OD (born 1945), also known as Brother Dee, is a Jamaican guitarist best known for his work as a session musician and as a member of Zap Pow and the Roots Radics, who since 1999 has recorded as a solo artist.

== Biography ==
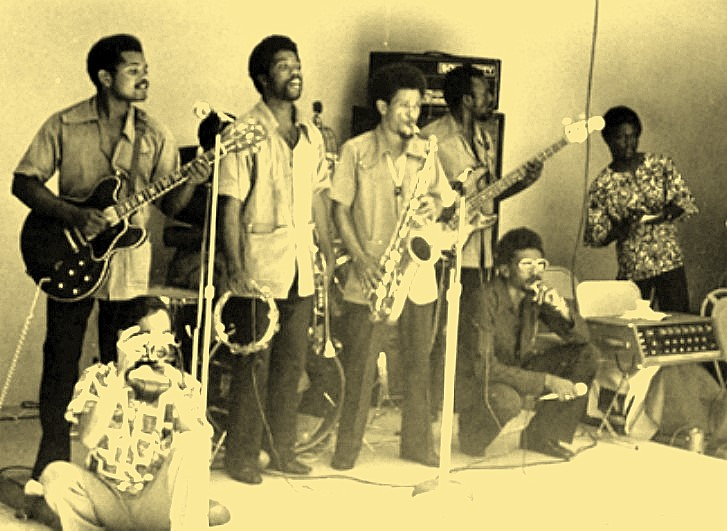
Zap-Pow in the street in Spanish Town, Jamaica. 1979

Dwight Pinkney was born in Manchester Parish, Jamaica, moving to Kingston as a youth. In the mid-1960s he formed The Sharks as guitarist, the band recording for Studio One and backing The Wailers on their 1965 Jamaican hit single "Put It On", also providing backing for recordings by Ken Boothe and The Gaylads. One of Pinkney's most successful songs, written in 1967 while a member of The Sharks, is "How Could I Live", which was originally released as the b-side of Jeff Dixon and Marcia Griffiths' "Words" single, and has since been recorded by artists including Myrna Hague, The Heptones, Richie Stephens, George Nooks, and Dennis Brown (as "How Could I Leave"). Pinkney moved on along with Michael Williams to form Zap Pow in 1969, a band with members later included Beres Hammond, David Madden, and Glen DaCosta. Zap Pow recorded several albums and their best-known song, "This is Reggae Music", was co-written by Pinkney. In the mid-1970s, Pinkney put his recording career on hold to attend the Jamaican School of Music, undertaking a course in Afro-American music, and studying arranging, and later taking on a teaching role. In the early 1980s he joined the Roots Radics, replacing Sowell Radics, and he also worked on dozens of albums by artists including Barry Brown, Bunny Wailer, Culture, Frankie Paul, The Itals, Yellowman, Gregory Isaacs, Lee Scratch Perry, Israel Vibration, Beres Hammond, Marcia Griffiths, Freddie McGregor, Toots, Charlie Chaplin and many others.

In 1999 he released his debut solo album, the award winning Jamaican Memories by the Score, which includes an updated version of "How Could I Live". Further albums followed in 2000 and 2002. In 2004 he contributed to the album Is it Rolling Bob? A Reggae Tribute to Bob Dylan. In 2008 he released an album of instrumental versions of Bob Marley songs, Dwight Pinkney Picks Marley Melodies.

In 2000, he formed a new band, the Distinguished Personalities Band (aka the DP Band) along with Keith Francis and Earl Fitzsimmons.

In 2012 he released Dwight Pinkney and D.P. Band Plays the Ventures+ Jamaican Style, an album of instrumentals featuring reggae versions of surf instrumentals and film and television themes. It was included in the provisional list of 50 albums in contention for the Grammy Award for Best Reggae Album.

In 2016, Pinkney released the album Reggae Christmas Hits, including contributions from Bob Andy, Ken Boothe, Boris Gardiner, Pam Hall, Ansel Collins, and Dean Fraser.

Pinkney has also appeared in the films Smile Orange, Land of Look Behind, and Holyland.

In August 2014 it was announced that Pinkney would receive the Order of Distinction in October that year for his contribution to the development of Jamaican music.

== Solo discography ==
- Jamaican Memories by the Score (1999) RAS/TP
- All Occasions (2000)
- More Jamaican Memories (2002) VP
- Home Grown Jamaican (2005)
- Reggae Chronicles (2006) Hallmark
- Love & Peace (2007)
- Dwight Pinkney Picks Marley Melodies (2008) VP
- Dwight Pinkney and D.P. Band Plays the Ventures+ Jamaican Style (2012), Tad's
- Reggae Christmas Hits (2016), Abengg International
- Knockout (2021) VP

== Awards ==
- Jamaica Federation of Musicians Union (JFMU) Award for Jamaican Memories by the Score
- Reggae-Soca Music Award for Jamaican Memories by the Score
- Canadian Pippers Award, 2002
- International Reggae and World Music Award (IRAWMA) of Honour for contribution the development of Jamaican music, 2008.
- Order of Distinction -Officer class from Government of Jamaica 2014
