= David Madden (musician) =

Jamaican trumpeter (born 1943)

- Born: 7 December 1943 (age 82); Kingston, Jamaica
- Origin: Kingston, Jamaica
- Genres: Reggae, ska, rocksteady, dance hall
- Occupations: Musician, singer, composer, trumpeter, record producer
- Instrument: Trumpet
- Years active: Early 1960s-present
- Label: LMS Music
- Formerly of: Im & Dave, Zap Pow
- Website: www.davidpmadden.com

David Madden (born 1943) is a Jamaican trumpeter known for his solo recordings and as a member of Zap Pow, as well as playing on records of Bob Marley and many other great reggae artists.

== Biography ==
David Madden has been around for many years in the Jamaican music business – composing, arranging, singing, and playing the trumpet. He has recorded with artists such as Bob Marley & the Wailers, Ernest Ranglin, Freddie McGregor, Jimmy Cliff, Burning Spear, Bob Andy, Peter Tosh, Beres Hammond, Ziggy Marley, Dawn Penn, Dennis Brown, and Sean Paul.

Madden began playing the trumpet at Alpha Boys School. By age 17, he went to Jamaica Military Band, then on to the Jamaican entertainment pop scene.

Madden teamed with saxophonist Cedric "Im" Brooks as the duo Im and David to record for producer Coxsone Dodd at the famous Studio One. "Money Maker" and "Candy Eye" were both hits, reaching number one and number ten respectively on the Jamaican charts. Madden also worked as a session musician and arranger at Studio One.

Madden then went on to become a co-founder of the progressive-reggae group, Zap Pow for which he penned another chart-topper "Mystic Mood" that catapulted the group into stardom. Other hits were to follow such as "Tonight We Love", "Scandal Corner", "This is Reggae Music", and "Sweet Loving Love". While with Zap Pow, Madden, as a studio musician, was featured on at least nineteen of Bob Marley's hit songs, and was a floor member of the Wailers in 1982–83 when Zap Pow disbanded.

In 1979 Madden was made an honorary citizen of the city of Atlanta, Georgia, while touring with Bob Marley & the Wailers.

Resuming his solo career with his debut album, Going Bananas, Madden released his first single as a solo performer, titled "Chained", on his own Large, Medium and Small Music (LMS) label. "Chained" was co-produced by the Wailers' keyboardist, Tyrone Downie. Since 1983 Madden has recorded several albums such as Reggae Trumpetaa, Changing Times, and Dance Haawan. With four albums to his credit, David then released his first CD, Cyber-Charged Ska, which he took to Midem, France to introduce his cyber-ska to the audiences. He then released the compilation set Horny Reggae Horn: The Best of David Madden. On this retrospective set, can be found Madden's work from the early 1980s, including "Lonely People", "She She Mugae", "Mystic Mood", and the romantic "Love Light". Other CDs released are Cybernetix Online and Long Live Reggae Music. His first EP, Pon di Internet, was released in 2013, and was followed in 2014 with 4 Good Measure.

In October 2015 he released the EP Nice We Met, on which he sings as well as plays trumpet.

== Discography ==
=== EP ===
- Pon de Internet (2013), LMS
- 4 Good Measure (2014) – LMS
- Nice We Met (2015)

=== Albums ===
- Cyber Charged Ska (2000) – LMS
- Reggae Horn 1969–83 – Early David Madden (2008) – LMS
- Long Live Reggae Music (2008) – LMS
- Horny Reggae Horn – The Best of David Madden (2009) – LMS
- Luv – Hold U 4 Ever (2010), LMS
- Biography (2010), LMS
- Wow! Www.Ska (2010), LMS

=== Singles ===
- Fast Lane Slow (Fast Lane) (2011), LMS
- Digital Sound (Fast Lane Digital) (2011), LMS

=== Im & Dave ===
- Money Maker (1970) Coxsone (sometimes credited to Various Artists)

== See also ==
- Zap Pow
- The Wailers
