= Style Scott =

Jamaican reggae drummer

- Also known as: Style Rattadam, Style
- Born: Lincoln Valentine Scott; 29 April 1956; Chapelton, Clarendon Parish, Jamaica
- Died: 9 October 2014 (aged 58) Manchester Parish, Jamaica
- Genres: Reggae, dub
- Labels: On-U Sound Records; Lion & Roots

Lincoln Valentine Scott (29 April 1956 – 9 October 2014), better known as Style Scott, was a Jamaican reggae drummer, famous for playing in the Roots Radics and, later, with Dub Syndicate. He also recorded and performed with Prince Far I, Bunny Wailer, Scientist and Creation Rebel.

== Career ==
Born in Chapelton, Clarendon Parish, Scott's musical career started in the 1970s while he was still in the Jamaica Defence Force, when he would often sit in on band rehearsals. He started playing on sessions for Jamaica's reggae and dub producers at that time, which led to the formation of the Roots Radics band in 1978 with bass player Errol "Flabba" Holt and guitarist Eric "Bingy Bunny" Lamont. The group played as the rhythm section for many artists including Bunny Wailer, Israel Vibration, and Gregory Isaacs, as well as releasing their own records.

Scott met dub producer Adrian Sherwood of On-U Sound Records while touring Europe with Prince Far I in the 1980s the start of a long term collaboration, playing with several On-U acts including African Head Charge, Bim Sherman, New Age Steppers and Singers & Players. He became a core member of Dub Syndicate, and drummed on the debut LP by Suns of Arqa.

Scott started his own record label, Lion & Roots, which released the later Dub Syndicate records.

Scott was found dead in his home in Manchester Parish on 9 October 2014. The circumstances of his death are unknown at present but gunshots or explosions were heard from his house in Manchester Parish.
