= Satta Massagana =

Studio album by The Abyssinians
- Released: Original: 1976; Reissues: 1977, 1993, 2007
- Recorded: 1975–76
- Studios: Harry J. Studio & Joe Gibbs Studio, Kingston, Jamaica
- Genre: Reggae
- Length: 33:58
- Labels: Jam Sounds, Heartbeat
- Producer: The Abyssinians

The Abyssinians chronology
Satta Massagana (1976)	Arise (1978)

Alternative covers
- Forward On To Zion cover

Alternative cover
- Original Heartbeat cover from 1993

Professional ratings
Review scores
Source	Rating
Allmusic	3.5/5 stars
The Encyclopedia of Popular Music	4/5 stars

Satta Massagana is a roots reggae album released by The Abyssinians officially in 1976. It is widely considered The Abyssinians' crowning achievement and a classic roots reggae album.

The title track "Satta Massagana" was a huge hit and has been covered numerous times by both The Abyssinians and other artists since. It has been adopted by some Rastafarian groups as a hymn used during services. The song, the title of which translates from the Amharic language "አመሰገነ" as "Thank you", "Give Thanks", or "He gave praise" was originally recorded for Studio One in 1969, but the label's owner, Clement "Coxsone" Dodd declined to release it.

== Release history ==
The Abyssinians debut album has had a very complex release history. The first unofficial editions, very limited in quantity, were released by Clive Hunt in 1975. The first official release occurred in Jamaica in 1976 on Pentrate Label, issued by Clive Hunt and Geoffrey Chung, and shortly after in the United States on Jam Sounds.

The following years, 1977 and 1978, saw the album released by three labels under the title Forward On To Zion. The album was released in the United Kingdom on the UK Klik Chart Sounds and Different labels, as well as on Bernard Collins' own Clinch label. Similarly, Clive Hunt's US-based Azul label released the album under the title Satta. A note on track-listings: the Klik & Different releases reverted to the original track listing of the limited pre-release editions which placed the title track as the final track, furthermore, the Azul edition renamed some tracks and did not include "African Race".

The album would see numerous re-releases over the next decade, including in 1988 by Clinch and in 1989 by the Blue Moon label.

In 1993 the album was released on compact disc for the first time by Heartbeat Records. This edition included four previously unreleased bonus tracks. And once again in 2007 as a deluxe edition which included four additional bonus tracks.

== Ongoing Cultural Impact and Cover Versions of Songs from the Album ==
The title phrase is name-checked by Joe Strummer, near the outset of the 1979 song 'Jimmy Jazz' by The Clash ("Satta Massagana for Jimmy Dread").

In 1981, Roots Reggae chanter Bim Sherman recorded a re-working of The Abyssinians “Satta Massagana” with only the dub version released by New Age Steppers and Creation Rebel on the Threat to Creation album under the title of Ethos Design. The album was recorded at The Manor Studio in England. and Berry Street Studio.

British lovers rock–roots reggae artist Peter Hunnigale teamed up with fellow British reggae artist, Tippa Irie to record a version of the Abyssinians’ “Declaration of Rights” track, recorded for his Nah Give Up compilation, which won the Best Reggae Album MOBO Award in 1996.

== Track listing ==
=== Original release ===
==== Side one ====
1. "Declaration of Rights" (B. Collins) – 3:28
2. "Good Lord" (D. Manning, M. Planno) – 3:25
3. "Forward On To Zion" (B. Collins) – 3:46
4. "Know Jah Today" (B. Collins) – 2:56
5. "Abendigo" (L. Manning) – 3:33

==== Side two ====
1. "Y Mas Gan" (L. Manning) – 3:49
2. "Black Man's Strain" (B. Collins) – 2:45
3. "Satta A Masagana" (B. Collins, D. Manning, L. Manning) – 3:29
4. "I And I" (L. Manning) – 3:34
5. "African Race" (D. Manning) – 2:53

=== 1993 Heartbeat re-issue ===
1. "Declaration of Rights" (B. Collins) – 3:28
2. "The Good Lord" (D. Manning, M. Planno) – 3:25
3. "Forward Unto Zion" (B. Collins) – 3:46
4. "Know Jah Today" (B. Collins) – 2:56
5. "Abendigo" (L. Manning) – 3:33
6. "Y Mas Gan" (L. Manning) – 3:49
7. "Black Man's Strain" (B. Collins) – 2:45
8. "Satta Massagana" (B. Collins, D. Manning, L. Manning) – 3:29
9. "I And I" (L. Manning) – 3:34
10. "African Race" (D. Manning) – 2:53
11. "Leggo Beast" (B. Collins) – 3:10
12. "Peculiar Number" (D. Manning) – 4:00
13. "Reason Time" (L. Manning) – 2:55
14. "There Is No End" (L. Manning) – 3:22

=== 2007 Heartbeat deluxe edition bonus tracks ===
15. "Jerusalem" (D. Manning) – 2:17
16. "Leggo Beast Dub" (B. Collins) – 2:58
17. "Abendigo (Extended Mix)" (L. Manning) – 5:57
18. "Poor Jason Whyte (Extended Mix)" (D. Manning) – 4:18

== Personnel ==
- Bernard Collins, Donald Manning, Lynford Manning - vocals
- Mikey "Boo" Richards, Leroy "Horsemouth" Wallace, Sly Dunbar - drums
- Val Douglas, Robbie Shakespeare - bass
- Mikey Chung, Earl "Chinna" Smith - guitar
- Geoffrey Chung, Clive Hunt, Tyrone Downie - keyboards
- Clive Hunt, Jerome Francique, Llewellyn Chang - horns
- Clive Hunt - flute

Technical

- Bruce Davidson - engineer
- The Abyssinians & Clive Hunt - producer
