= Dub Syndicate =

English dub band

- Origin: London
- Genres: Reggae, dub
- Labels: On-U Sound Records; Lion & Roots
- Members: Adrian Sherwood; Style Scott

Dub Syndicate is a British dub band, formed by Adrian Sherwood, which became a showcase for Adrian Sherwood's collaboration with Lincoln "Style" Scott, former drummer with the Roots Radics, Suns of Arqa and Creation Rebel.

Dub Syndicate initially evolved out of Creation Rebel and had a classic dub sound until the third album, Tunes From The Missing Channel (1985), where Dub Syndicate gave birth to a more experimental, technological dub sound. Dub Syndicate's new sound centered on the interaction of Scott, Sherwood, and members of Tackhead, Skip McDonald, Keith LeBlanc and Doug Wimbish.

Dub Syndicate has collaborated with many other artists including Lee "Scratch" Perry, Bim Sherman (vocals), Keith Levene, Don Campbell (musician), Junior Reid, Big Youth, Felix "Deadley Headley" Bennett (saxophone), Prince Far I, Aswad and Burning Spear bassist George Oban, Alpha Boys' School-educated Eskimo Fox ( drummer), Noel Brownie, Alan Glen and Peter "Dr. Pablo" Stroud (melodica), (N.B. Dr. Pablo is not Augustus Pablo).

Most of the band's output has appeared on On-U Sound Records, produced by the label's owner Adrian Sherwood. More recent Dub Syndicate recordings were released on Style Scott's own Lion & Roots record label, and production duties were split between Sherwood, Scientist and Scott. More recently Dub Syndicate has worked with Dancehall artists such as Luciano, Capleton and Jr. Reid.

Scott was found dead in Jamaica on 11 October 2014.

== Discography ==
=== Albums ===
- The Pounding System (Ambience in Dub) (1982)
- One Way System (1983)
- North of the River Thames (with Dr. Pablo, 1984)
- Tunes from the Missing Channel (1985)
- Time Boom X De Devil Dead (with Lee "Scratch" Perry, 1987)
- Strike the Balance (1990)
- From the Secret Laboratory (with Lee "Scratch" Perry, 1990)
- Stoned Immaculate (1991)
- Echomania (1994)
- Ital Breakfast (1996)
- Mellow & Colly (1998)
- Fear of a Green Planet (1998)
- Acres of Space (2001)
- No Bed of Roses (2004)
- Hard Food (2015)

==== Pounding System ====
1. Pounding System
2. Hi-Fi Gets a Pounding, Pts. 1 & 2
3. "African Head Charge"-Don't Care About Space Invader Machines, Pt. 1&2
4. Fringe on Top Dub
5. Humorless Journalist Works to Rules
6. # 10 K at Ovu -60 Hz- Mind Boggles
7. Crucial Tony Tries to Rescue the Space Invaders
8. Hi-Fi Gets a Pounding, Pt. 3
9. Return to Stage One

==== One Way System ====
1. Socca
2. Overloader
3. Drilling Equipment
4. Drainpipe Rats
5. Schemers
6. Ascendant, Pt. 4
7. Synchronizer
8. Independence
9. Substyle
10. Displaced Master
11. Ascendant, Pt. 6

==== North of the River Thames ====
1. Man of Mystery
2. Dr. Who?
3. Pressurised
4. Tribute
5. A Taste of Honey
6. North of the River Thames
7. Red Sea
8. We Like It Hot

==== Tunes from the Missing Channel ====
1. Ravi Shankar, Pt. 1 3:41
2. The Show Is Coming 4:50
3. Must Be Dreaming 4:26
4. Overboard 3:41
5. Forever More 4:16
6. Geoffrey Boycott 4:33
7. Wellie 2:57
8. Jolly 4:11
9. Out and About 5:48

=== Compilations ===
- Classic Selection Volume 1 (1989)
- Classic Selection Volume 2 (1990)
- Live at the T+C - 1991 – with Akabu and Bim Sherman (1993)
- Classic Selection Volume 3 (1994)
- Research and Development (1996)
- Live at the Maritime Hall (2000)
- Murder Tone (2002)
- Pure Thrill Seekers (2005)
- The Rasta Far I (2006)
- The Royal Variety Show (The Best of Dub Syndicate)
- On U Sound 30 years anniversary (King Size Dub Special)
