= Discomix =

A discomix, or simply a disco, is an extended reggae 12-inch single that typically features the vocal track followed by a dub version or a deejay version of the same track. The format became popular in the mid-1970s, with the extended bass range of 12-inch singles being better suited to dub music. The first big hit discomix was a retake by the Jays of the old Coxsone Dodd Viceroys' Studio One tune, "Ya Ho". The Jays were members of Roy Cousins' outfit the Royals, with toaster Ranking Trevor. Their discomix version of "Ya Ho" was released in 1976, backed with the Revolutionaries and recorded at Joseph Hoo Kim's Channel One Studios. The popularity of the format led to Black Echoes magazine (later Echoes) publishing a weekly 'Reggae Disco Chart'.
