= Berry Street Studio =

Recording studio in London, England

Coordinates: 51.523885°N 0.100646°W

Berry Street Studio was a recording studio in Clerkenwell, Central London. Established in 1970, Berry Street is built along traditional lines, having a large live area, incorporating acoustically live and dead zones, together with isolation booths, and a control room.

During its history, Berry Street has been used by musicians such as Elton John, Billy Bragg, Michael Nyman, Radiohead, Freddie Mercury, Barry White, Paul Young, Devilish Presley, Pigbag, the Slits, and others. In the 1980s it was run by the British record producer Dennis Bovell and was used for recording much British and Jamaican dub and reggae. During Bovell's tenureship, the studio was used by British dub producer Adrian Sherwood, who worked on releases by Singers and Players and Dub Syndicate there. Since 1993 it has been run by the British producer Kevin Porée.

Berry Street's main console is a custom built GP40 by John Oram. The studio's additional recording channels include Neve, Amek, Solid State Logic, Trident and Oram; its microphone collection includes binaural and Ambisonic systems; and it also houses a Solid State Logic Superanalogue mixing system.

Berry Street Studio also has a successful live and location recording division, Berry Street Remote, and since 2010 has also offered a video production service.
