= Little Axe =

American blues musician (born 1949)

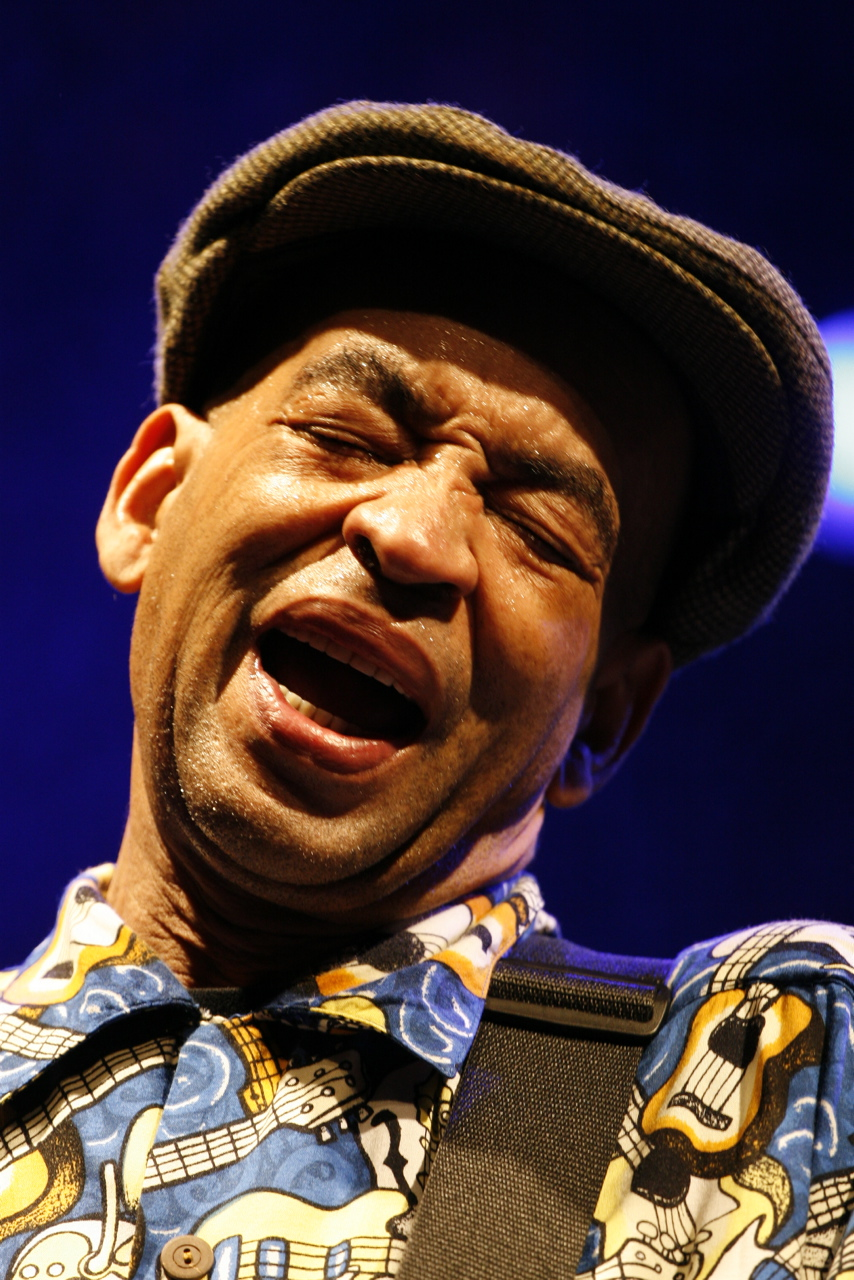
- McDonald in 2006

Background information
- Also known as: Skip McDonald
- Born: Bernard Alexander; September 1949 (age 76); Dayton, Ohio, U.S.
- Genres: R&B; hip hop; blues; industrial; dub
- Occupations: Musician; songwriter; record producer; musical string arranger
- Instruments: Vocals; guitar
- Years active: 1973–present
- Labels: Sugar Hill; Wired; Real World; Fat Possum; Okeh

Skip McDonald (born Bernard Alexander, September 1949) is an American musician who also performs under the stage name Little Axe.

== Career ==
=== Early career ===
Grounded in blues music learned from his father, a steel worker who played blues guitar at weekends, McDonald spent his early days playing jazz, doo-wop, and gospel, and eventually relocated to New York City as a teenager with his band of friends, called The Entertainers.

McDonald formed the group Wood Brass & Steel in 1973 with bass guitarist Doug Wimbish and drummer Harold Sargent. The group recorded two albums before their 1979 breakup. He then became part of the house band for Sugarhill Records and appeared as a session player on many early rap recordings, including "The Message" by Grandmaster Flash and The Furious Five.

=== Post-Sugarhill ===
After leaving Sugarhill, McDonald, Wimbish, and drummer Keith LeBlanc began working with Adrian Sherwood, and eventually formed the trio into the industrial/dub group Tackhead, initially fronted by Gary Clail and later Bernard Fowler. McDonald also collaborated with Sherwood on other projects, including albums by African Head Charge and Mark Stewart.

In the 1990s, McDonald assumed the moniker "Little Axe" and began moving from hip hop to a form of blues that drew from an array of musical influences, including dub, R&B, gospel, and jazz. He has been working steadily as a studio musician, recording both his own blues albums, and continuing to appear as a guest act on other artists' albums. His most recent albums have been released on Real World Records. Alan Glen is often featured on harmonica on these albums.

In 2009, he collaborated with Mauritanian musician Daby Touré to produce an album, Call My Name.

As of 2016, he still tours and gigs regularly, has a loyal following and is in regular demand for session work as a guitarist.

== Discography ==
- Never Turn Back (1993, Spin)
- The Wolf that House Built (1994, Okeh/Wired)
- Slow Fuse (1996, Wired)
- Hard Grind (2002, On-U Sound)
- Champagne & Grits (2004, Real World/Virgin)
- Stone Cold Ohio (2006, Real World/Virgin)
- Bought for a Dollar, Sold for a Dime (2010, Real World)
- If You Want Loyalty Buy a Dog (2011, On-U Sound)
- Wanted - Live 1996 (2012, Little Axe Recordings)
- Return (2013, Echo Beach)
- One Man - One Night (2016, 12:10 Records)
- London Blues (2017, Echo Beach)

With Will Downing

- Will Downing (Island Records, 1988)
- Come Together as One (Island Records, 1989)
- A Dream Fulfilled (Island Records, 1991)

With Harold Melvin & the Blue Notes

- Talk It Up (Tell Everybody) (Philly World, 1984)

With Melba Moore

- I'm in Love (Capitol Records, 1988)
- Soul Exposed (Orpheus, 1990)

With Sinéad O'Connor

- Faith and Courage (Atlantic Records, 2000)
- Sean-Nós Nua (Vanguard Records, 2002)

With The O'Jays

- Love And More (Philadelphia Records, 1984)

With Lou Rawls

- Close Company (Epic Records, 1984)

With Brenda K. Starr

- I Want Your Love (Mirage, 1985)

With Candi Staton

- Nightlites (Sugar Hill Records, 1982)

With The Sugarhill Gang

- Sugarhill Gang (Sugar Hill, 1980)

With Donna Summer

- Mistaken Identity (Atlantic Records, 1991)

With Peter Wolf

- Come As You Are (EMI, 1987)
