= On-U Sound Records =

English record label

- Founded: May 1979
- Founder: Adrian Sherwood and Pete Holdsworth
- Genre: Dub, reggae, experimental, electronic
- Country of origin: UK
- Location: London
- Official website: http://www.on-usound.com

On-U Sound Records is an English record label known for releasing its own unique flavour of dub music since the 1980s. The label was founded by Adrian Sherwood in 1979/1980 and is home to acts such as Tackhead, Dub Syndicate, African Head Charge, Akabu, The London Underground, Little Annie, Creation Rebel, Mark Stewart, Gary Clail (who would have a number of Top 40 hits, like "Human Nature", credited to Gary Clail On-U Sound System), New Age Steppers, Audio Active, Asian Dub Foundation, and the dub collective Singers & Players.

== See also ==
- List of record labels
