= Adrian Sherwood =

English record producer (born 1958)

- Born: Adrian Maxwell Sherwood; 20 January 1958 (age 68); London, England
- Genres: Dub; trip hop; reggae; industrial
- Occupation: Record producer
- Labels: On-U Sound Records; Pressure Sounds; Real World Records; Soundboy Records; Hitrun Records; Green Tea Records; Carib Gems
- Website: adriansherwood.com

Adrian Maxwell Sherwood (born 20 January 1958) is an English record producer specialising in the genre of dub music. He has created a distinctive production style based on the application of dub effects and dub mixing techniques to other forms of electronic dance music and popular music outside of the genre. Adrian has been credited as a pioneer in the emerging genre of reggae-EDM. He has worked extensively with a variety of reggae artists as well as the musicians Keith LeBlanc, Doug Wimbish and Skip McDonald. Sherwood has remixed tracks by Coldcut, Depeche Mode, the Woodentops, Primal Scream, Pop Will Eat Itself, Sinéad O'Connor, and Skinny Puppy. In his role as a record producer, he has worked with a variety of record labels; however, his best-known label is On-U Sound Records which he founded in 1979. Sherwood has been a member of the band Tackhead. He considers himself tone deaf, and focuses on making sounds and noises rather than melody.

== Career ==
Sherwood was co-founder of Carib Gems and Pressure Sounds, and founder of Hitrun Records as well as Green Tea Records and Soundboy Records. He is also the fourth member of the industrial hip-hop outfit Tackhead, credited as "mixologist".

During the early 1980s, he brought together many Jamaican artists under the collective name of Singers and Players, including Prince Far I, Mikey Dread, Bim Sherman and many others; this helped promote the individual artists at the same time as promoting the On-U Sound Records label. He also worked with Suns of Arqa on many of their early records. In 1982, Adrian produced an EP, Hot Sagas, with a version of Love for Sale sung by Anne Pigalle, released on Illuminated Records. Together with Style Scott he formed the band Dub Syndicate, which went on eventually to produce over a dozen albums.

In 1986, he began working with Jamaican dub producer and singer Lee "Scratch" Perry. They produced the album Time Boom X De Devil Dead.

He made contributions to the industrial genre in his remix of Einstürzende Neubauten's song "Yü Gung" on the album Halber Mensch, as well as his production work with Ministry, Skinny Puppy, Cabaret Voltaire, KMFDM, Terminal Power Company and Nine Inch Nails. Sherwood has also delved into the blues, producing Little Axe's Real World Records release Champagne & Grits in 2006.

In 2003, Sherwood supported Blur at Wolverhampton Civic Hall. The same year, Sherwood released his first album as a solo artist, Never Trust a Hippy, which featured collaborations with various artists such as Sly & Robbie, Steven "Lenky" Marsden, Carlton "Bubblers" Ogilvie and Jazzwad.

In 2006, he released his second album Becoming a Cliché, again with numerous artists such as Perry, the late Bim Sherman, Dennis Bovell, Little Roy, LSK (musician), Samia Farah, Raiz and Mark Stewart. A limited edition, 2-disc version was released simultaneously with the second disc titled Dub Cliché.

On beginning a solo career, Sherwood stated: "I wanted to do some of my own writing and make something that was challenging for me... As a producer, it's my job to satisfy the artist foremost. I wanted to make something that was a little more aggressive and modern. I wanted to paint a picture that was contemporary, one that specifically showed where my brain was at. I've got to the point in my life where it's time for me to call all of the shots."

He produced the original score for the 2006 independent film Johnny Was, starring Vinnie Jones, Roger Daltrey and Samantha Mumba. Since 2015, Sherwood commissioned an album from Bristol dubstep artist Pinch; which he twiddled a few knobs on and released under the moniker "Sherwood and Pinch".

On 21 September 2022, American rock band Spoon announced Lucifer on the Moon, a track-by-track dub reworking of Lucifer on the Sofa, with all remixes by Adrian Sherwood. The album was released on November 4, 2022.

Sherwood released his ninth studio album, The Collapse of Everything, on 22 August 2025. He hosted radio station Radio On-U in the 2026 video game Grand Theft Auto VI.

== Discography ==
Adapted from AllMusic.

- Never Trust a Hippy (2003) (Real World Records)
- Becoming a Cliché (2006) (Real World Records)
- On-U Sound Crash: Slash and Mix (2006) (EMI)
- Tackhead Sound Crash Slash and Mix Adrian Sherwood (2006) (EMI)
- Dub Cliche (2006) (Real World Records)
- Dub Setter (2009) (On-U Sound)
- Survival & Resistance (2012) (On-U Sound)
- Fire (2023) (Salgari Records)
- The Collapse of Everything (2025) (On-U Sound)
