= Tackhead Sound Crash =

Remix album by Tackhead
- Released: November 13, 2006
- Recorded: 1985 –1989
- Genre: Funk, industrial
- Length: 46:00
- Label: Beat, On-U Sound
- Producer: Tackhead

Tackhead chronology
Power Inc. Volume 3 (Live) (1997)	Tackhead Sound Crash (2006)	For the Love of Money (2014)

Tackhead Sound Crash is a remix album by the industrial hip-hop group Tackhead. It was released on November 13, 2006 on Beat and On-U Sound Records.

== Track listing ==
All tracks are written by Keith LeBlanc, Skip McDonald, Adrian Sherwood and Doug Wimbish, except where noted

No.	Title	Writer(s)	Artist	Length
1.	"Spoken Intro/Free" (overdub)	Keith LeBlanc, Skip McDonald, J. Robert Oppenheimer, Adrian Sherwood, Doug Wimbish	Fats Comet	0:48
2.	"Mind at the End of the Tether"		Tackhead	1:30
3.	"What's My Mission Now?"		Tackhead	2:06
4.	"Ghost"	Andy Fairley, Keith LeBlanc, Skip McDonald	Andy Fairley	1:47
5.	"Mind at the End of the Tether" (reprise)		Tackhead	1:07
6.	"1/2 Cut for Confidence"	Gary Clail, Keith LeBlanc, Adrian Sherwood	Tackhead Productions Remix/Gary Clail	0:54
7.	"Ticking Time Bomb"		Tackhead	2:02
8.	"Heaven on Earth"		Keith LeBlanc	0:43
9.	"Ticking Time Bomb" (reprise)		Tackhead	0:12
10.	"Heaven on Earth" (reprise)		Keith LeBlanc	0:47
11.	"Mechanical Movements" (remix)	Keith LeBlanc	Keith LeBlanc	2:21
12.	"I Stopped the Clock"		Andy Fairley	0:52
13.	"Bop Bop"		Fats Comet	0:52
14.	"King of the Beat"		Fats Comet/DJ Cheese	3:00
15.	"Move It/Body to Burn" (intros)		Keith LeBlanc/Tackhead	0:09
16.	"D.J. Programme"		Fats Comet	0:15
17.	"Disconnection"	David Harrow, Keith LeBlanc, Skip McDonald, Adrian Sherwood, Mark Stewart, Doug Wimbish	Strange Parcels	3:41
18.	"Rockchester"	Adrian Sherwood, Doug Wimbish	Fats Comet	2:50
19.	"Audio Visual Attack"		Andy Fairley	1:55
20.	"Man in a Suitcase"	Andy Fairley, Skip McDonald, Doug Wimbish	Tackhead/Gary Clail	1:07
21.	"Original Change"		Tackhead	2:21
22.	"Dreamworld" (dub version)		Keith LeBlanc	0:56
23.	"Get This Beloved"		Keith LeBlanc	0:36
24.	"Gamesmanship"		Tackhead	1:52
25.	"Get Move of This" (reprise)		Keith LeBlanc	1:38
26.	"Einstein"	Keith LeBlanc	Keith LeBlanc	2:17
27.	"Hard Left"		Tackhead/Gary Clail	1:59
28.	"No Hands on the Wheel"		Strange Parcels	0:46
29.	"Listen Good Drummers"		Keith LeBlanc	0:56
30.	"Free Again" (reprise)		Fats Comet	0:46
31.	"This Is the Night"		Fats Comet	1:37
32.	"Bastard Son of Fats"		Tackhead/Bernard Fowler	1:18
33.	"Spoken Outro"	Meyer Dolinsky		0:09

== Personnel ==
Tackhead

- Keith LeBlanc – drums
- Skip McDonald – guitar
- Adrian Sherwood – effects
- Doug Wimbish – bass guitar

Technical personnel

- Nick Coplowe – engineering (4, 6, 18-20)
- Tackhead – producer

== Release history ==
Region	Date	Label	Format	Catalog
United Kingdom	2006	Beat, On-U Sound	CD	3750 192
