= Tackhead discography =

- Studio albums: 4
- Compilation albums: 4
- Singles: 12
- Remix albums: 1

The discography of industrial hip-hop group Tackhead consists of four studio albums, four compilation albums, twelve singles and one remix album.

== Albums ==
=== Studio albums ===
| Title | Album details | UK Indie |
|---|---|---|
| Tackhead Tape Time | Released: February 1988 (UK); Label: Nettwerk; Formats: CD, CS, LP | 9 |
| Friendly as a Hand Grenade | Released: October 1989 (UK); Label: World; Formats: CD, CS, LP | 3 |
| Strange Things | Released: September 1990 (UK); Label: SBK; Formats: CD, LP | — |
| For the Love of Money | Released: 10 January 2014 (DE); Label: Dude; Formats: CD, LP, Digital Download | — |
"—" denotes a recording that did not chart or was not released in that territory.

=== Compilation albums ===
| Title | Album details |
|---|---|
| Power Inc. Volume 1 | Released: 1994 (UK); Label: Blanc; Formats: CD |
| Power Inc. Volume 2 | Released: 1994 (UK); Label: Blanc; Formats: CD |
| Power Inc. Volume 3 (Live) | Released: 1997 (UK); Label: Blanc; Formats: CD/10" EP |
| Metal Box | Released: 2012; Label: Tackhead.com; Formats: CD/DVD |

=== Remix albums ===
| Title | Album details |
|---|---|
| Tackhead Sound Crash | Released: 13 November 2006 (UK); Label: Beat, On-U Sound; Formats: CD |

== Singles ==
| Year | Title | Peak chart positions | | Album |
| Year | Title | NZ | UK Indie | Album |
|---|---|---|---|---|
| "Half Cut for Confidence" | 1985 | — | — | Non-album singles |
| "What's My Mission Now?" | 1985 | — | 9 | Non-album singles |
| "Mind at the End of the Tether" | 1986 | — | 31 | Non-album singles |
| "Hard Left" | 1986 | — | — | Non-album singles |
| "The Game (You'll Never Walk Alone)" | 1987 | 34 | — | Non-album singles |
| "Reality" | 1988 | — | 3 | Tackhead Tape Time |
| "Ticking Time Bomb" | 1989 | — | 7 | Friendly as a Hand Grenade |
| "Demolition House" | 1990 | — | — | Friendly as a Hand Grenade |
| "Dangerous Sex" | 1990 | — | — | Strange Things |
| "Class Rock" | 1990 | — | — | Strange Things |
| "Videohead" | 1991 | — | — | Non-album singles |
| "Exodus" | 2011 | — | — | Non-album singles |
| "Powerstation 2.0 (David M. Williams Mix)" | 2023 | — | — | |
| Non-album singles | "—" denotes a recording that did not chart or was not released in that territory. | | | |

== Music videos ==
List of music videos, showing year released and directors
| Title | Year | Director(s) |
|---|---|---|
| "Hard Left" | 1986 | — |
| "Reality" | 1988 | — |
| "Ticking Time Bomb" | 1989 | — |
| "Dangerous Sex" | 1990 | John Maybury |
