= Power Inc. Volume 3 (Live) =

Live album by Tackhead
- Released: November 4, 1997
- Recorded: 1985 –1994
- Genre: Funk, industrial
- Length: 58:50
- Label: Blanc

Tackhead chronology
| Power Inc. Volume 2 (1994) | Power Inc. Volume 3 (Live) (1997) | Tackhead Sound Crash (2006) |

Professional ratings
Review scores
| Source | Rating |
|---|---|
| AllMusic | 2.5/5 stars |

Power Inc. Volume 3 (Live) is a live performance compilation album by the industrial hip-hop group Tackhead. It was released on November 4, 1997, on Blanc Records.

== Track listing ==
| No. | Title | Recorded | Length |
|---|---|---|---|
| 1. | "(Gorge Pick Up)" | | 0:24 |
| 2. | "The Bubbly" | 1994 in New Zealand | 4:24 |
| 3. | "(Pick Up the Phone)" | | 0:08 |
| 4. | "The Law of Repetition" | 1990 in Manchester | 3:11 |
| 5. | "(Pick Up #2)" | | 0:11 |
| 6. | "Doug Storm" | 1994 in Holland | 8:10 |
| 7. | "(Your Dogging Me)" | | 0:21 |
| 8. | "The King" | 1994 in Holland | 4:36 |
| 9. | "(Pick Up The Fucking Phone...)" | | 0:08 |
| 10. | "The Game" | 1988 in London | 6:59 |
| 11. | "(Pick Up #3)" | | 0:06 |
| 12. | "Mind at the End of the Tether" | 1989 in New York | 4:14 |
| 13. | "(Fats Comet?)" | | 0:04 |
| 14. | "Airborn Ranger" | 1988 in Edinburgh | 3:19 |
| 15. | "(Kadoosh)" | | 0:25 |
| 16. | "Shake the House" | 1986 in Utrecht | 2:57 |
| 17. | "(Easy Mike)" | | 0:27 |
| 18. | "Ticking Time Bomb" | 1985 in London | 3:28 |
| 19. | "(Fletcher)" | | 0:11 |
| 20. | "Object – Subject" | 1987 in London | 1:36 |
| 21. | "(KKK)" | | 0:07 |
| 22. | "Heaven on Earth" | 1987 in London | 2:42 |
| 23. | "(Anybody?)" | | 0:09 |
| 24. | "Hard Left" | 1989 in New York | 4:11 |
| 25. | "New York Breakdown" | 1986 in New York | 5:48 |
| 26. | "(Gorge Picks Up!)" | | 0:34 |

== Personnel ==
Tackhead

- Keith LeBlanc – drums, sampler
- Skip McDonald – guitar, sampler
- Adrian Sherwood – effects, mixing
- Doug Wimbish – bass guitar, sampler

Additional musicians

- Gary Clail – vocals (24)
- Bernard Fowler – vocals (4)
- Melle Mel – vocals (25)
- Mark Stewart – vocals (16)

== Release history ==
| Region | Date | Label | Format | Catalog |
|---|---|---|---|---|
| United Kingdom | 1997 | Blanc | CD | BLCCD17 |
