= Power Inc. Volume 1 =

Compilation album by Tackhead
- Released: 1994
- Recorded: 1985 –1987
- Genre: Funk, industrial
- Length: 56:16
- Label: Blanc
- Producer: Tackhead

Tackhead chronology
Strange Things (1990)	Power Inc. Volume 1 (1994)	Power Inc. Volume 2 (1994)

Professional ratings
Review scores
Source	Rating
Allmusic	2.5/5 stars
Muzik	3/5 stars

Power Inc. Volume 1 is a compilation album by the American industrial hip-hop group Tackhead. It was released in 1994 on Blanc Records.

== Track listing ==
All tracks are written by Keith LeBlanc, Skip McDonald, Adrian Sherwood and Doug Wimbish, except where noted

No.	Title	Writer(s)	Artist	Length
1.	"Ticking Time Bomb" (dub version)		Tackhead	6:17
2.	"Stealing" (original version)		Tackhead/Bim Sherman	4:21
3.	"My One and Only One"		Fats Comet	3:17
4.	"Hard Left"	Gary Clail, Keith LeBlanc, Skip McDonald, Adrian Sherwood, Doug Wimbish	Tackhead/Gary Clail	7:46
5.	"Original Sex"		Tackhead/Melle Mel	6:06
6.	"Stormy Weather"	Harold Arlen, Ted Koehler	Fats Comet	6:21
7.	"Bop Bop"		Fats Comet	4:05
8.	"Bastard Son of Fats"	Bernard Fowler, LeBlanc, McDonald, Sherwood, Wimbish	Tackhead	5:25
9.	"Rockchester" (remix)		Fats Comet	5:08
10.	"What's My Mission Now?" (parts 1 & 2)		Tackhead	7:30

== Personnel ==
Tackhead

- Keith LeBlanc – drums, percussion
- Skip McDonald – guitar
- Adrian Sherwood – sampler, programming
- Doug Wimbish – bass guitar

Technical personnel

- Jill Mumford – design
- Mark Stewart – design
- Tackhead – producer

== Release history ==
Region	Date	Label	Format	Catalog
United Kingdom	1994	Blanc	CD	BLCCD10
