= Power Inc. Volume 2 =

Compilation album by Tackhead
- Released: 1994
- Recorded: 1985 –1987
- Genre: Funk, industrial
- Length: 68:50
- Label: Blanc
- Producer: Tackhead

Tackhead chronology
Power Inc. Volume 1 (1994)	Power Inc. Volume 2 (1994)	Power Inc. Volume 3 (Live) (1997)

Professional ratings
Review scores
Source	Rating
Allmusic	3/5 stars
Muzik	4/5 stars

Power Inc. Volume 2 is a compilation album by the American industrial hip-hop group Tackhead. It was released in 1994 on Blanc Records.

== Track listing ==
No.	Title	Writer(s)	Artist	Length
1.	"Mechanical Movements" (remix)	LeBlanc	Keith LeBlanc	4:54
2.	"Dreamworld" (dub version)	LeBlanc, Sherwood, Wimbish	Keith LeBlanc	4:59
3.	"Einstein" (remix)	LeBlanc	Tackhead Productions Remix	6:54
4.	"Move It" ("M.O.V.E." remix)	LeBlanc, McDonald, Sherwood, Wimbish	Keith LeBlanc	6:36
5.	"Feel Free"	LeBlanc, McDonald, Sherwood, Wimbish	Fats Comet	2:11
6.	"Get This" (remix)	LeBlanc, Sherwood, Wimbish	Keith LeBlanc	6:16
7.	"Give a Little/This Is the Night"	LeBlanc, Sherwood, Wimbish	Fats Comet	8:34
8.	"The Bubbly"	LeBlanc, Sherwood, Wimbish	Tackhead	4:16
9.	"Technology Works" (remix)	LeBlanc, Sherwood, Wimbish	Keith LeBlanc	4:27
10.	"Crosstown Traffic"	Hendrix	Tackhead/Doug Wimbish	3:27
11.	"Original Change"	LeBlanc, Sherwood, Wimbish	Tackhead	5:20
12.	"Body to Burn" (remix)	LeBlanc, Sherwood, Wimbish	Tackhead/Doug Wimbish	3:10
13.	"King of the Beat"	LeBlanc, McDonald, Sherwood, Wimbish	Fats Comet	7:46

== Personnel ==
Tackhead

- Keith LeBlanc – drums, percussion
- Skip McDonald – guitar
- Adrian Sherwood – sampler, programming, remix (1, 6)
- Doug Wimbish – bass guitar

Technical personnel

- Anna Hurl – design
- Tackhead – producer

== Release history ==
Region	Date	Label	Format	Catalog
United Kingdom	1994	Blanc	CD	BLCCD11
