= For the Love of Money (album) =

Studio album of cover songs by Tackhead
- Released: January 10, 2014
- Recorded: On-U Sound Studios, Steakhouse Bungalow, Tree House
- Genre: Industrial hip hop
- Length: 70:52
- Label: Dude Records
- Producer: Keith LeBlanc

Tackhead chronology
Tackhead Sound Crash (2006)	For the Love of Money (2014)

For the Love of Money is the fourth album by the industrial hip hop group Tackhead, released on January 10, 2014, by Dude Records. It marks their first full-length release of studio material since Strange Things, released twenty-four years prior. It comprises covers of musical acts that have proven influential to the group over the years, along with an extended cut of their original song "Stealing" from Friendly as a Hand Grenade.

== Track listing ==
No.	Title	Writer(s)	Original artist (date)	Length
1.	"For the Love of Money"	Gamble, Huff, Jackson	The O'Jays (1973)	4:47
2.	"Loose Booty"	Beane, Clinton	Funkadelic (1972)	4:50
3.	"Higher Ground"	Wonder	Stevie Wonder (1973)	3:58
4.	"King Bee"	Moore	Slim Harpo (1957)	3:14
5.	"Just Kissed My Baby"	Modeliste, Neville, Nocentelli, Porter	The Meters (1974)	4:44
6.	"Fire"	Beck, Bonner, Jones, Middlebrooks, Pierce, Satchell	Ohio Players (1974)	4:24
7.	"Walk on the Wildside"	Reed	Lou Reed (1972)	4:26
8.	"Stealing" (extended version)	Fowler, LeBlanc, McDonald, Sherwood, Wimbish	Tackhead (1989)	8:58
9.	"Funky President"	Brown	James Brown (1974)	4:16
10.	"I'm Afraid of Americans"	Bowie, Eno	David Bowie (1997)	5:15
11.	"War"	Barrett, Cole	Bob Marley (1976)	3:48
12.	"Black Cinderella"	Dunbar, Dunkley, Fraser, Stephenson, Tucker	Errol Dunkley (1972)	3:39
13.	"Exodus" (Dubvisionist mix)	Marley	Bob Marley (1977)	6:36
14.	"Black Cinderella" (Adrian Sherwood dub mix)	Dunbar, Dunkley, Fraser, Stephenson, Tucker	Errol Dunkley (1972)	3:43
15.	"For the Love of Money" (instrumental version)	Gamble, Huff, Jackson	The O'Jays (1973)	4:14

Digital release track listing
No.	Title	Writer(s)	Original artist (date)	Length
1.	"For the Love of Money"	Gamble, Huff, Jackson	The O'Jays (1973)	4:47
2.	"Loose Booty"	Beane, Clinton	Funkadelic (1972)	4:50
3.	"Higher Ground"	Wonder	Stevie Wonder (1973)	3:58
4.	"King Bee"	Moore	Slim Harpo (1957)	3:14
5.	"Just Kissed My Baby"	Modeliste, Neville, Nocentelli, Porter	The Meters (1974)	4:44
6.	"Fire"	Beck, Bonner, Jones, Middlebrooks, Pierce, Satchell	Ohio Players (1974)	4:24
7.	"Stealing" (extended version)	Fowler, LeBlanc, McDonald, Sherwood, Wimbish	Tackhead (1989)	8:58
8.	"Funky President"	Brown	James Brown (1974)	4:16
9.	"I'm Afraid of Americans"	Bowie, Eno	David Bowie (1997)	5:15
10.	"War"	Barrett, Cole	Bob Marley (1976)	3:48
11.	"Black Cinderella"	Dunbar, Dunkley, Fraser, Stephenson, Tucker	Errol Dunkley (1972)	3:39
12.	"Exodus" (Dubvisionist mix)	Marley	Bob Marley (1977)	6:36
13.	"Black Cinderella" (Adrian Sherwood dub mix)	Dunbar, Dunkley, Fraser, Stephenson, Tucker	Errol Dunkley (1972)	3:43
14.	"For the Love of Money" (instrumental version)	Gamble, Huff, Jackson	The O'Jays (1973)	4:14
15.	"Don't Let Me Down"	Lennon–McCartney	The Beatles (1969)	4:20
16.	"You Ain't Hip"	Blackman	Don Blackman (1982)	3:15
17.	"Funky President" (Adrian Sherwood mix)	Brown	James Brown (1974)	4:57
18.	"Just Begun" (Adrian Sherwood mix)	Castor, Pruitt, Thomas	The Jimmy Castor Bunch (1972)	3:42
19.	"Loose Booty" (Adrian Sherwood mix)	Beane, Clinton	Funkadelic (1972)	5:22
20.	"War" (Steakhouse mix)	Barrett, Cole	Bob Marley (1976)	3:48
21.	"War" (Umberto Echo mix)	Barrett, Cole	Bob Marley (1976)	3:48
22.	"Exodus" (Dubvisionist extended mix)	Marley	Bob Marley (1977)	6:35
23.	"Walk on the Wildside" (KLB mix)	Reed	Lou Reed (1972)	5:07

Digipak edition track listing
No.	Title	Writer(s)	Original artist (date)	Length
1.	"For the Love of Money" (Adrian Sherwood mix)	Gamble, Huff, Jackson	The O'Jays (1973)	4:49
2.	"Loose Booty" (Danny Saber mix)	Beane, Clinton	Funkadelic (1972)	4:52
3.	"Higher Ground" (AS-Paralyzer mix)	Wonder	Stevie Wonder (1973)	3:59
4.	"King Bee" (Wohlklang mix)	Moore	Slim Harpo (1957)	3:15
5.	"Just Kissed My Baby" (Adrian Sherwood mix)	Modeliste, Neville, Nocentelli, Porter	The Meters (1974)	4:44
6.	"Fire" (Adrian Sherwood mix)	Beck, Bonner, Jones, Middlebrooks, Pierce, Satchell	Ohio Players (1974)	4:26
7.	"Stealing" (extended version)	Fowler, LeBlanc, McDonald, Sherwood, Wimbish	Tackhead (1989)	9:00
8.	"Funky President" (Gary Clail mix)	Brown	James Brown (1974)	4:18
9.	"I'm Afraid of Americans" (Adrian Sherwood mix)	Bowie, Eno	David Bowie (1997)	5:17
10.	"War" (Umberto Echo mix)	Barrett, Cole	Bob Marley (1976)	3:49
11.	"Black Cinderella" (Adrian Sherwood mix)	Dunbar, Dunkley, Fraser, Stephenson, Tucker	Errol Dunkley (1972)	3:42
12.	"Exodus" (Dubvisionist mix)	Marley	Bob Marley (1977)	3:51
13.	"Black Cinderella" (Adrian Sherwood dub mix)	Dunbar, Dunkley, Fraser, Stephenson, Tucker	Errol Dunkley (1972)	3:46
14.	"Black Cinderella" (Robo Bass Hifi remix)	Dunbar, Dunkley, Fraser, Stephenson, Tucker	Errol Dunkley (1972)	3:46
15.	"Funky President" (Adrian Sherwood mix)	Brown	James Brown (1974)	5:00
16.	"Homeless"	Mayfield	Curtis Mayfield (1990)	4:30
17.	"For the Love of Money" (instrumental version)	Gamble, Huff, Jackson	The O'Jays (1973)	4:15

== Personnel ==
Tackhead

- Bernard Fowler – lead vocals, backing vocals, co-producer
- Keith LeBlanc – drums, percussion, drum machine, producer, mixing
- Skip McDonald – guitar, keyboards, vocals, backing vocals, co-producer
- Adrian Sherwood – mixing, co-producer
- Doug Wimbish – bass guitar, keyboards, backing vocals, co-producer

Technical personnel

- Dubvisionist – mixing
- Umberto Echo – mixing
- Martin Fekl – mixing, co-producer
- Arn Schlürmann – mixing, co-producer

== Release history ==
Region	Date	Label	Format	Catalog
Germany	2014	Dude	CD, LP	DR109
