= Mark Stewart + Maffia =

Compilation album by Mark Stewart and The Maffia
- Released: 1986
- Recorded: 1981–1985
- Genre: Post-punk
- Length: 42:36
- Label: Upside
- Producer: Adrian Sherwood, Mark Stewart

Mark Stewart chronology
As the Veneer of Democracy Starts to Fade (1985)	Mark Stewart + Maffia (1986)	Mark Stewart (1987)

Professional ratings
Review scores
Source	Rating
AllMusic	4/5 stars

Mark Stewart + Maffia is a compilation album by British singer Mark Stewart, released in 1986 through Upside Records. It was released in the United States to promote Stewart's first two solo efforts and contains tracks from Learning to Cope with Cowardice on side one and tracks from As the Veneer of Democracy Starts to Fade on the second side. The songs were remastered by Herb Powers Jr. for the compilation.

== Track listing ==
All tracks are written by Mark Stewart, except "Jerusalem" by William Blake

Side one
No.	Title	Length
1.	"Learning to Cope with Cowardice"	6:10
2.	"Liberty City"	5:37
3.	"Blessed Are Those Who Struggle"	5:13
4.	"Jerusalem"	3:44

Side two
No.	Title	Length
1.	"Hypnotized" (12" version)	7:25
2.	"As the Veneer of Democracy Starts to Fade"	5:37
3.	"Pay It All Back"	4:29
4.	"The Waiting Room"	4:18

== Personnel ==
- Mark Stewart – vocals, production
- The Maffia (side one)
  - Desmond "Fatfingers" Coke – keyboards
  - Charles "Eskimo" Fox – drums
  - Evar Wellington – bass
- The Maffia (side two)
  - Keith LeBlanc – drums
  - Skip McDonald – guitar
  - Adrian Sherwood – keyboards, production
  - Doug Wimbish – bass

Technical

- Herb Powers Jr. – mastering
