= Reality (Tackhead song) =

Single by Tackhead/Gary Clail

from the album Tackhead Tape Time
- B-side: "Life & Dreams"
- Released: January 1988
- Genre: Funk, industrial
- Length: 7:07 (album version); 5:55 (single version)
- Label: On-U Sound
- Songwriter(s): Gary Clail, Keith LeBlanc, Skip McDonald, Adrian Sherwood, Doug Wimbish
- Producer(s): Tackhead

Tackhead singles chronology
| "The Game (You'll Never Walk Alone)" (1987) | "Reality" (1988) | "Ticking Time Bomb" (1989) |

Music video
- "Reality" on youtube.com

"Reality" is a single by the industrial hip-hop group Tackhead, released in January 1988 on On-U Sound Records.

== Formats and track listing ==
All songs written by Gary Clail, Keith LeBlanc, Skip McDonald, Adrian Sherwood and Doug Wimbish

UK 12" single (ON-U DP 19)

1. "Reality" – 5:55
2. "Life & Dreams" – 3:27

== Personnel ==
Tackhead

- Gary Clail – vocals
- Keith LeBlanc – drums, percussion
- Skip McDonald – guitar
- Adrian Sherwood – sampler, programming
- Doug Wimbish – bass guitar

Technical personnel

- Tackhead – producer

== Charts ==
| Chart (1987) | Peak position |
|---|---|
| UK Indie Chart | 3 |
