= Jungle Funk (album) =

Live album by Jungle Funk
- Released: 1998
- Recorded: April 12, 1998 – April 14, 1998
- Venue: Conrad Sohm, Dornbirn, Austria
- Genre: Drum and bass, funk, R&B
- Length: 69:59
- Label: ESC
- Producer: Jungle Funk, Doug Wimbish

Professional ratings
Review scores
Source	Rating
Allmusic	3/5 stars

Jungle Funk is the eponymously titled debut album of Jungle Funk, released in 1998 by ESC Records. Capturing a live collaboration between musicians Will Calhoun, Vinx de Jon Parette and Doug Wimbish, the material comprising the album was recorded over the course of two days in April 1998 at Conrad Sohm, Austria. It combined the hard funk of Living Colour with the more technology based sampling approach of Tackhead.

== Track listing ==
All tracks are written by Jungle Funk, except "Aquarius" by Galt MacDermot, James Rado and Gerome Ragni.

No.	Title	Length
1.	"Ugly Face"	6:35
2.	"Worship"	4:11
3.	"Trance"	5:24
4.	"Headfake"	3:06
5.	"September"	3:14
6.	"Torn"	5:38
7.	"Temporary Love"	5:35
8.	"Cycles"	6:39
9.	"Perculator"	2:58
10.	"Still I Try"	5:12
11.	"Aquarius"	3:12
12.	"People"	6:39
13.	"Jungle Funk"	3:57
14.	"Prague City Lights"	3:26
15.	"Research & Development"	4:13

== Personnel ==
Jungle Funk

- Will Calhoun – drums, percussion, loops
- Vinx De'Jon Parrette – vocals, sampler, percussion, loops
- Doug Wimbish – bass guitar, loops, vocals, producer, mixing

Additional musicians

- Darren Grant – backing vocals (3)
- Green Tea – keyboards and programming (8)
- Pete Holdsworth – keyboards and programming (8)
- Keith LeBlanc – loops (5), drums and percussion (3)
- Skip McDonald – vocals and guitar (3)
- Professor Stretch – keyboards and programming (8)

Technical personnel

- Cedric Beatty – engineering
- Jungle Funk – producer
- Matt Hathaway – engineering (3)
- Ted Jensen – mastering

== Release history ==
Region	Date	Label	Format	Catalog
Germany	1998	ESC	CD	ESC 03658-2
United States	1999	Zebra	CD	ZD 44014-2
