= Tackhead Tape Time =

Studio album by Gary Clail's Tackhead Sound System
- Released: 1987
- Genres: Funk, industrial
- Length: 36:11
- Label: Nettwerk
- Producer: Tackhead

Tackhead chronology
Tackhead Tape Time (1987)	Friendly as a Hand Grenade (1989)

Professional ratings
Review scores
Source	Rating
AllMusic	4/5 stars

Tackhead Tape Time is the debut album by Tackhead. It was released in 1987 through Nettwerk Music Group.

== Composition ==
Tackhead Tape Time is a "robotic" electro-funk album, containing abrasive beats, funky guitar, and instances of tape delay, which hint at the album's dub and reggae roots. The album also boasts spliced, sampled speeches and quotes from the likes of Prime Minister Margaret Thatcher, downbeat news reports, military officers and televangelists, among other sources.

== Track listing ==
All tracks are written by Tackhead.

No.	Title	Length
1.	"Mind at the End of the Tether"	6:38
2.	"Half Cut Again"	0:28
3.	"Reality"	7:07
4.	"M.O.V.E."	2:23
5.	"Hard Left"	5:07
6.	"Get This"	4:26
7.	"Man in a Suitcase"	4:09
8.	"What's My Mission Now? (Fight the Devil)"	5:51

2004 CD re-issue bonus tracks
No.	Title	Length
9.	"Something About You"	6:48
10.	"Autograph"	5:35

== Accolades ==
Year	Publication	Country	Accolade	Rank
1995	Alternative Press	United States	"Top 99 of '85 to '95"	27
"*" denotes an unordered list.

== Personnel ==
Tackhead

- Keith LeBlanc – instruments
- Skip McDonald – instruments
- Adrian Sherwood – instruments
- Doug Wimbish – instruments

Additional musicians and production

- Cesare – scratching on "Man in a Suitcase"
- Gary Clail – mixing
- Tackhead – producer
