= This Is Stranger Than Love =

Single by Mark Stewart and The Maffia

from the album Mark Stewart
- Released: September 1987
- Genre: Post-punk, industrial
- Length: 7:13
- Label: Mute
- Songwriter(s): Mark Stewart
- Producer(s): Adrian Sherwood

Mark Stewart singles chronology
| "Hypnotized" (1985) | "This Is Stranger Than Love" (1987) |

"This Is Stranger Than Love" is a single by British vocalist Mark Stewart, released in September 1987 on Mute Records.

== Formats and track listing ==
UK 7" single (MUTE 59)

1. "This Is Stranger Than Love" – 7:13
2. "This Is Stranger Than Love" (dub version) – 5:28
3. "Anger Is Holy" – 9:10

UK 12" single (12 MUTE 59)

1. "This Is Stranger Than Love" – 7:13
2. "This Is Stranger Than Love" (dub version) – 5:28
3. "Survival" – 4:08

== Personnel ==
- The Maffia
  - Keith LeBlanc – drums, percussion
  - Skip McDonald – guitar
  - Adrian Sherwood – sampler, programming, production
  - Doug Wimbish – bass
- Mark Stewart – vocals

== Charts ==
| Chart (1987) | Peak position |
|---|---|
| UK Indie Chart | 7 |
