= Disconnection (album) =

Studio album by Strange Parcels
- Released: 16 August 1994
- Genre: Industrial hip hop
- Length: 54:50
- Label: On-U Sound
- Producer: Tackhead

Professional ratings
Review scores
Source	Rating
Allmusic	3/5 stars
Entertainment Weekly	A−

Disconnection is the debut album of Strange Parcels, released on August 16, 1994, by On-U Sound Records. Bill Tilland of the music journal Option said gave the album a positive review, saying "There's enough ear candy here to satiate even the sweetest audio sweet tooth, and it's served up with a combination of outrageous musical humor and impeccable taste."

== Track listing ==
No.	Title	Writer(s)	Length
1.	"Badman Land"	Skip McDonald, Adrian Sherwood,	6:10
2.	"Pride"	Keith LeBlanc, Skip McDonald, Jesse Rae	6:37
3.	"Sorry Bootsy"		4:11
4.	"The Danger"	Skip McDonald, Adrian Sherwood, Doug Wimbish	4:16
5.	"Disconnection"	David Harrow, Adrian Sherwood, Mark Stewart	4:56
6.	"All Souls"	Skip McDonald, Jesse Rae, Adrian Sherwood, Doug Wimbish	5:52
7.	"Strangeland"	Skip McDonald, Adrian Sherwood, Doug Wimbish	4:29
8.	"Control Breakdown"	Keith LeBlanc, Skip McDonald, Adrian Sherwood, Doug Wimbish	4:59
9.	"No Hands on the Wheel"	Skip McDonald, Adrian Sherwood, Doug Wimbish	3:01
10.	"Funk Dog"	Keith LeBlanc	5:07
11.	"Outsider"	Skip McDonald, Adrian Sherwood	5:11

== Personnel ==
Strange Parcels

- Keith LeBlanc – drums, programming (10)
- Skip McDonald – guitar, vocals, keyboards
- Doug Wimbish – bass guitar, effects

Additional musicians

- Basil Clarke – vocals
- Jesse Rae – vocals
- Talvin Singh – percussion
- David Harrow – keyboards, programming

Technical personnel

- Paul Beckett – programming, recording
- Tackhead – producer

== Release history ==
Region	Date	Label	Format	Catalog
United Kingdom	1994	On-U Sound	CD	ON-U CD 57
United Kingdom	1994	On-U Sound	LP	ON-U LP 57
United States	1994	Restless	CD	7 72778-2
