= Strange Parcels =

- Genres: Industrial hip hop
- Years active: 1991–1994
- Label: On-U Sound
- Past members: Keith LeBlanc; Skip McDonald; Doug Wimbish

Strange Parcels was an industrial hip-hop group, formed in 1991. The nucleus was guitarist Skip McDonald, drummer Keith LeBlanc and bassist Doug Wimbish. The group also enlisted the aid of numerous guest musicians, including Mark Stewart, Bim Sherman, Jesse Rae, Talvin Singh and Basil Clarke.

== History ==
After Tackhead's dissolution in 1990, producer Adrian Sherwood, bassist Doug Wimbish and multi instrumentalist David Harrow wished to return to territory akin to that of their former musical project Fats Comet, which had been abandoned in 1987. Radio presenter Steve Barker of On the Wire described their musical approach as "Temptations on acid", in that the group would use pop oriented material as a foundation on which to experiment. In 1991, they recorded several tracks which appeared on Pay It All Back compilations issued through On-U Sound Records.

Recorded with tabla player Talvin Singh and reduced input from Sherwood, Strange Parcels' full-length debut Disconnection was released in 1994. Critic Stephen Cook described it as "a cross between David Byrne and Brian Eno's My Life in the Bush of Ghosts and some of Singh's later solo outings, with the occasional funk-rock beat being wholly a Tackhead leftover." After the release of Disconnection, Strange Parcels was abandoned with its members continuing to pursue other musical endeavors.

== Discography ==
Albums

- Disconnection (On-U Sound, 1994)

Singles

- "More Is Insane" (w/Bim Sherman) (On-U Sound, 1993)
- "Body Blastin'" (w/Jesse Rae) (On-U Sound, 1993)
- "Disconnection" (On-U Sound, 1994)
