= Stop the Confusion (Global Interference) =

Compilation album by Keith LeBlanc
- Released: July 26, 2005
- Genre: Funk, electro, dub
- Length: 77:51
- Label: Collision: Cause of Chapter 3
- Producer: Keith LeBlanc

Keith LeBlanc chronology
Freakatorium (1999)	Stop the Confusion (Global Interference) (2005)

Professional ratings
Review scores
Source	Rating
AllMusic	4/5 stars

Stop the Confusion (Global Interference) is a compilation album by drummer Keith LeBlanc, released on July 26, 2005, by Collision: Cause of Chapter 3.

== Track listing ==
No.	Title	Writer(s)	Artist	Length
1.	"Whatever"	Keith LeBlanc	Keith LeBlanc	1:39
2.	"What Order"	Sas Bell, Kevin Gibbs, Skip McDonald, Melle Mel, Doug Wimbish	Interference/Bee La Key/Melle Mel	4:18
3.	"The Beast"	Bim Sherman	Bim Sherman	3:47
4.	"Green Theory"	Bim Sherman	Bim Sherman	3:48
5.	"Story of Violence"	Keith LeBlanc	DJ Spike	4:08
6.	"Technology Works"	Skip McDonald, Adrian Sherwood, Doug Wimbish	Tackhead	4:24
7.	"Steps"	Keith LeBlanc	Keith LeBlanc	5:33
8.	"Stop the Confusion"	Bernie Worrell, Betty Shabazz, Tim Simenon	Tim Simenon	3:03
9.	"Tree"	Tim Simenon	Interference/Andy Fairley	2:36
10.	"React Like This"	Tim Simenon	Interference	5:37
11.	"What Order" (Remote Control dub)	Tim Simenon	Interference	5:29
12.	"Time Out"	Bim Sherman	Bim Sherman	4:04
13.	"Sleepy Head"	Bim Sherman, Tim Simenon	Bim Sherman	4:04
14.	"Vision"	Bim Sherman	Bim Sherman	5:08
15.	"Repetition"	Skip McDonald, Adrian Sherwood, Doug Wimbish	Tackhead	4:16
16.	"The Dentist"	Skip McDonald, Adrian Sherwood, Doug Wimbish	Tackhead	4:01
17.	"Tackhead Dub"	Skip McDonald, Adrian Sherwood, Doug Wimbish	Tackhead	3:12
18.	"Tack Unit" (Extended Interference - Friday The 13th version)	Keith LeBlanc	Keith LeBlanc	6:38
19.	"Stick Out"	Keith LeBlanc	DJ Spike	2:06

== Release history ==
Region	Date	Label	Format	Catalog
Germany	2005	Collision: Cause of Chapter 3	CD	CCT3003-2
