= Trippy Notes for Bass =

Studio album by Doug Wimbish
- Released: August 24, 1999
- Recorded: On-U Sound Studios, Matrix Studios, Unique Recording, Bish Mobile, The Villa, London
- Genre: Industrial hip hop, jazz fusion, dub
- Length: 58:02
- Label: On-U Sound
- Producer: Adrian Sherwood, Doug Wimbish

Doug Wimbish chronology
Trippy Notes for Bass (1999)	CinemaSonics (2008)

Professional ratings
Review scores
Source	Rating
Allmusic	4/5 stars
Alternative Press	4/5 stars
Spin	8/10

Trippy Notes for Bass is the first solo album by bassist Doug Wimbish, released on August 24, 1999 by On-U Sound Records. On March 3, 2008, the album was re-issued as Trippy Notes for Bass & Remixes on Dude Records.

== Track listing ==
No.	Title	Writer(s)	Length
1.	"Quasimodo"	Skip McDonald, Doug Wimbish	1:32
2.	"Perplex"	Adrian Sherwood, Doug Wimbish	5:11
3.	"Bedwood"	Adrian Sherwood, Doug Wimbish	5:19
4.	"Gangster"	Alex Foster, Doug Wimbish, Bernie Worrell	5:39
5.	"Just Another Minute"	Doug Wimbish	1:14
6.	"Arabic Cat"	Adrian Sherwood, Doug Wimbish	4:38
7.	"Leave It Alone"	Alex Foster, Adrian Sherwood, Doug Wimbish, Bernie Worrell	4:56
8.	"Veneered"	Adrian Sherwood, Doug Wimbish	5:43
9.	"Glorification Chant"	Adrian Sherwood, Doug Wimbish	5:54
10.	"Logdrum"	Adrian Sherwood, Doug Wimbish	4:11
11.	"Splash"	Doug Wimbish	3:38
12.	"Will & Skip"	Will Calhoun, Skip McDonald, Doug Wimbish	2:09
13.	"Glory"	Adrian Sherwood, Doug Wimbish	3:16
14.	"Daze"	Adrian Sherwood, Doug Wimbish	3:22
15.	"Pass It Around"	Skip McDonald, Doug Wimbish	1:20

Trippy Notes for Bass & Remixes bonus tracks
No.	Title	Writer(s)	Length
16.	"Logdrum" (Adrian Sherwood remix)	Adrian Sherwood, Doug Wimbish	4:54
17.	"Anthem" (remix)	Adrian Sherwood, Doug Wimbish	4:27
18.	"Leave It Alone" (remix)	Alex Foster, Adrian Sherwood, Doug Wimbish, Bernie Worrell	4:57
19.	"Arabic Cat" (remix)	Adrian Sherwood, Doug Wimbish	6:37

== Personnel ==
Musicians

- Doug Wimbish – bass guitar, keyboards, effects, vocals, producer, engineering, mixing
- Nigel Butler – keyboards, effects, programming
- Will Calhoun – drums, percussion, co-producer
- Sussan Deyhim – vocals (6, 9)
- Alex Foster – saxophone
- Keith LeBlanc – drums, percussion
- Skip McDonald – guitar, keyboards, editing, co-producer
- Adrian Sherwood – keyboards, editing, producer, engineering, mixing
- Talvin Singh – tabla, percussion
- Bernie Worrell – acoustic piano, keyboards

Technical personnel

- Alan Branch – editing
- Tony Brown – engineering
- Darren Grant – engineering
- Nick Küpfer – engineering
- Andy Montgomery – engineering
- Vernon Reid – photography

== Release history ==
Region	Date	Label	Format	Catalog
Germany	1999	On-U Sound	CD	ON-U CD 0091
United Kingdom	1999	On-U Sound	LP	ON-U LP 0091
Germany	2008	Dude	CD	DR104
