= Stranger Things (disambiguation) =

Stranger Things is an American horror streaming television series.

Stranger Things may also refer to:

== Media ==
- Stranger Things (franchise), the wider multimedia franchise surrounding the titular series

== Comics ==
- Stranger Things, an issue of the Buffy the Vampire Slayer spinoff comic Spike (IDW Publishing)

== Film ==
- Stranger Things (film), a 2010 British drama film

== Music ==
=== Albums ===
- Music of Stranger Things, including a list of soundtrack and compilation albums associated with the TV series
- Stranger Things (Marc Almond album), 2001
- Stranger Things (Edie Brickell & New Bohemians album), 2006
- Stranger Things (Yuck album), 2016

=== Songs ===
- "Stranger Things" (ABC song), 1997
- "Stranger Things" (Kygo song), 2018
- "Stranger Things" (Joyner Lucas and Chris Brown song), 2018
- "Stranger Things", a song by Local Natives from their 2009 album Gorilla Manor
- "Stranger Things", a song by Periphery from the 2015 album Juggernaut: Omega

== See also ==
- Strange Thing (disambiguation)
- Stranger Things Have Happened (disambiguation)
- Strange Things, a 1990 album by Tackhead
- Danger Things, a parody of Stranger Things in The Simpsons
