= CinemaSonics =

Studio album by Doug Wimbish
- Released: May 28, 2008
- Genre: Industrial hip hop, drum and bass
- Length: 58:02
- Label: Yellowbird
- Producer: Milan Cimfe, Bernard Fowler, Keith LeBlanc, Adrian Sherwood, Michal Vaniš, Doug Wimbish

Doug Wimbish chronology
Trippy Notes for Bass (1999)	CinemaSonics (2008)

CinemaSonics is the second album by Doug Wimbish, released on May 28, 2008, by Yellowbird Records.

== Track listing ==
No.	Title	Writer(s)	Length
1.	"Revolution"	Keith LeBlanc, Skip McDonald, Adrian Sherwood, Doug Wimbish	2:52
2.	"Trance (Make My Own Reality)"	Bernard Fowler, Skip McDonald, Doug Wimbish	4:53
3.	"Scary Man"	Bernard Fowler, Doug Wimbish	6:02
4.	"Homeless"	Curtis Mayfield	5:25
5.	"Danger"	Basil Clarke, Skip McDonald, Adrian Sherwood, Doug Wimbish	3:55
6.	"Rockin' Shoes"	Skip McDonald, Doug Wimbish	4:17
7.	"Silent Footsteps/Minor "D"eparture"	Sas Bell, Kevin Gibbs, Skip McDonald, Doug Wimbish	6:56
8.	"Swirl"	Doug Wimbish	3:34
9.	"Broadcasting"	Adrian Sherwood, Doug Wimbish	6:22
10.	"I Wanna Know"	Shara Nelson, Adrian Sherwood, Doug Wimbish	4:42
11.	"Special Request"	Keith LeBlanc, Skip McDonald, Sister Carol, Doug Wimbish, Bernie Worrell	6:00
12.	"No Release, No Surrender"	Sas Bell, Kevin Gibbs, Skip McDonald, Doug Wimbish	4:59
13.	"Easy Philosophy"	Doug Wimbish	4:13

== Personnel ==
Musicians

- Doug Wimbish – bass guitar, guitar, keyboards, producer, mixing, vocals (1, 2, 5–7, 12)
- Milan Cimfe – drums, percussion, producer, mixing, vocals (1)
- Nick Coplowe – guitar
- Pavel Dirda – piano, keyboards
- Pete Lockett – percussion
- Skip McDonald – guitar, keyboards, producer

Additional musicians

- Sas Bell – vocals (7)
- William S. Burroughs – spoken word (6)
- Will Calhoun – drums (6, 10)
- Bernard Fowler – producer, vocals (2–4)
- Kevin Gibbs – vocals (7)
- Hari Haran – backing vocals
- Jazzwad – programming (4)
- Keith LeBlanc – producer, drums (1)
- Jiri Majzlik – trumpet (3, 4)
- Stepan Markovic – saxophone (3, 4)
- Shara Nelson;- vocals (1, 10)
- Petr Ostrouchov – mandolin, banjo
- Quartet Apollon – strings (3)
- Sister Carol – vocals (11)
- Bernie Worrell – keyboards (11)
- Dave Flash Wright – saxophone and flute (9)

Technical personnel

- Pavel Karlík – mixing, mastering
- Adrian Sherwood – producer, mixing
- Michal Vaniš – producer, mixing

== Release history ==
Region	Date	Label	Format	Catalog
Germany	2008	Yellowbird	CD	yeb-7705 2
