= Rockchester =

Single by Fats Comet
- B-side: "OK Bye!"
- Released: January 1987
- Recorded: Southern Studios, London, England
- Genre: Funk, industrial
- Length: 6:16
- Label: World
- Songwriter(s): Keith LeBlanc, Skip McDonald, Adrian Sherwood, Doug Wimbish
- Producer(s): Fats Comet

Fats Comet singles chronology
"Stormy Weather" (1985)	"Rockchester" (1987)

"Rockchester" is a single by the British industrial hip-hop group Fats Comet, released in January 1987 on World Records.

== Release and reception ==
In the August 1986 issue of Spin, columnist John Leland described the song as "the best dance music now being made" The single entered the UK Indie Chart in 1987, remaining there for eleven weeks and peaking at No. 6. The song's B-side later appeared on the retrospective compilation album Power Inc. Vol. 1, released in 1994.

In 1997, Future Sound of London released the hit single We Have Explosive, part three of which interpolates a looped sample of "Rockchester".

== Formats and track listing ==
All songs written by Keith LeBlanc, Skip McDonald, Adrian Sherwood and Doug Wimbish

UK 12" single (WR006)

1. "Rockchester" – 6:16
2. "OK Bye!" – 5:18

== Personnel ==
Musicians

- Keith LeBlanc – drums, percussion
- Skip McDonald – guitar
- Adrian Sherwood – sampler, programming
- Bim Sherman – additional vocals
- Doug Wimbish – bass guitar

Technical personnel

- Kevin Metcalfe – mastering
- George Tashiro – editing

== Charts ==
Chart (1987)	Peak position
UK Indie Chart	6
