= Mark Stewart (album) =

Studio album by Mark Stewart
- Released: October 1987
- Genre: Post-punk, industrial
- Length: 66:15
- Label: Mute
- Producer: Adrian Sherwood, Mark Stewart

Mark Stewart chronology
Mark Stewart + Maffia (1986)	Mark Stewart (1987)	Metatron (1990)

Professional ratings
Review scores
Source	Rating
AllMusic	3/5 stars

Mark Stewart is the third album by British singer Mark Stewart, released in 1987 through Mute Records.

== Track listing ==
All lyrics are written by Mark Stewart, except where noted; all music is composed by Keith LeBlanc, Skip McDonald and Doug Wimbish, except where noted

No.	Title	Lyrics	Music	Length
1.	"Survival"			5:10
2.	"Survivalist"			2:42
3.	"Anger Is Holy"			9:10
4.	"Hell Is Empty"			7:03
5.	"Stranger"		Erik Satie, Mark Stewart	8:17
6.	"Forbidden Colour"	David Sylvian	Ryuichi Sakamoto	4:42
7.	"Forbidden Dub"	David Sylvian	Ryuichi Sakamoto	3:10
8.	"Fatal Attraction"			8:58
9.	"Stranger Than Love"		Erik Satie, Mark Stewart	7:13
10.	"Stranger Than Love" (dub version)		Erik Satie, Mark Stewart	5:28
11.	"Survival"			4:08

== Personnel ==
- The Maffia
  - Keith LeBlanc – drums
  - Skip McDonald – guitar
  - Adrian Sherwood – keyboards, production
  - Doug Wimbish – bass guitar
- Mark Stewart – vocals, production

== Charts ==
Chart (1987)	Peak position
UK Indie Chart	5
