= Time Traveller (Keith LeBlanc album) =

Studio album by Keith LeBlanc
- Released: September 1992
- Genre: Electro
- Length: 50:48
- Label: Blanc
- Producer: Keith LeBlanc

Keith LeBlanc chronology
Raw (1990)	Time Traveller (1992)	Freakatorium (1999)

Time Traveller is the fourth album by drummer Keith LeBlanc, released in September 1992 by Blanc Records.

== Track listing ==
All tracks are written by Keith LeBlanc, except where noted.

Side one
No.	Title	Writer(s)	Length
1.	"Skin Stretch"	Talvin Singh	2:23
2.	"Split the Planet"		3:08
3.	"Major Drum"		1:50
4.	"Ernie"		1:25
5.	"Earshot" ("Get This" remix)	Skip McDonald	2:13
6.	"Fight the System"		1:34
7.	"Point Blanc"		2:02
8.	"Howi"		1:53
9.	"Hallelujah"		3:38

Side two
No.	Title	Length
1.	"Heaven Only Knows"	5:34
2.	"Time Traveller"	12:44
3.	"Enjoy"	4:15

CD bonus tracks
No.	Title	Writer(s)	Length
13.	"ESP"	Craig Derry, Skip McDonald, Doug Wimbish	2:49
14.	"Nine Times Nine"	Skip McDonald, Doug Wimbish	2:43
15.	"Duo"		2:30

== Personnel ==
Musicians

- Willy B. – vocals (A2)
- Craig Derry – vocals (13)
- Kenji Jammer – guitar (A2-A4, A7, B2, B3)
- Keith LeBlanc – drums, drum programming, percussion, keyboards, effects, bass guitar, trumpet, editing, producer, engineering, mixing
- Skip McDonald – guitar (A5, B1-B3, 13, 14)
- Style Scott – percussion (A7)
- Bim Sherman – vocals (A9)
- Tim Simenon – turntables (A2-A8)
- Talvin Singh – tabla (A4, A9, B2), percussion (15)
- Doug Wimbish – bass guitar (B1-B3, 13, 14)
- Egon Zo – effects (B2)

Technical personnel

- Harvey Birrell – engineering, mixing (A9, B1-B3, 14, 15)
- Tom Lord-Alge – engineering
- Kevin Metcalfe – mastering
- Dave Pine – engineering
- John Smith – engineering

== Release history ==
Region	Date	Label	Format	Catalog
United Kingdom	1992	Blanc	LP	BLC 6
United Kingdom	1992	Blanc	CD	BLC 6CD
