= Hypnotized (Mark Stewart song) =

Single by Mark Stewart

from the album As the Veneer of Democracy Starts to Fade
- B-side: "As the Veneer of Democracy Starts to Fade"
- Released: May 1985
- Genre: Post-punk, industrial
- Length: 5:51
- Label: Mute
- Songwriter(s): Mark Stewart
- Producer(s): Adrian Sherwood

Mark Stewart singles chronology
"Hypnotized" (1985)	"This Is Stranger Than Love" (1987)

"Hypnotized" is a single by British vocalist Mark Stewart, released in May 1985 on Mute Records.

== Formats and track listing ==
All songs written by Mark Stewart.

UK 7" single (7 MUTE 037)

1. "Hypnotized" (edit) – 3:59
2. "As the Veneer of Democracy Starts to Fade" – 5:33

UK 12" single (12 MUTE 037)

1. "Hypnotized" (remix) – 7:24
2. "As the Veneer of Democracy Starts to Fade" – 5:33
3. "Dreamers" – 6:29

== Accolades ==
Year	Publication	Country	Accolade	Rank
1985	Rockerilla	Italy	Singles of the Year	13

== Personnel ==
- The Maffia
  - Keith LeBlanc – drums, percussion
  - Skip McDonald – guitar
  - Adrian Sherwood – sampler, programming, production
  - Doug Wimbish – bass guitar
- Mark Stewart – vocals

== Charts ==
Charts (1985)	Peak position
UK Indie Chart	9
