= Support the Miners =

Single by The Enemy Within
- B-side: "Strike" (general mix)
- Released: October 1984
- Genre: Electro
- Length: 3:39
- Label: Rough Trade
- Songwriter(s): Keith LeBlanc
- Producer(s): Keith LeBlanc, Adrian Sherwood

Keith LeBlanc singles chronology
"No Sell Out" (1983)	"Support the Miners" (1984)

Support the Miners is a single released by American drummer Keith LeBlanc under the moniker The Enemy Within, released in October 1984 on Rough Trade Records. Similar to the re-issuing of No Sell Out the same year, Support the Miners was released to aid the miners strike in Great Britain, with the proceeds going to the "Miners Solidarity Fund". "Strike" features voice samples of Arthur Scargill, a trade unionist and former president of the National Union of Mineworkers.

== Accolades ==
Publication	Country	Accolade	Year	Rank
The Face	United Kingdom	Singles of the Year	1984	59

== Formats and track listing ==
All songs written by Keith LeBlanc

UK 7" single (RT 151)

1. "Strike" – 3:39
2. "Strike" (general mix) – 3:54

== Personnel ==
Adapted from the Support the Miners liner notes.

- Keith LeBlanc – producer
- Adrian Sherwood – producer

== Charts ==
Chart (1984)	Peak position
UK Indie Chart	2

== Release history ==
Region	Date	Label	Format	Catalog
United Kingdom	1984	Rough Trade	LP	RT 151
