= Strawberry (song) =

1998 song by Nicole Renée

Single by Nicole Renée

from the album Nicole Renée
- B-side: "Yea, Yea, Yea"
- Released: September 15, 1998
- Genre: R&B
- Length: 3:52
- Label: Atlantic
- Songwriter(s): John Blake, Nicole Renée
- Producer(s): Nicole Renée

Nicole Renée singles chronology
"Strawberry" (1998)	"Telephone" (1998)

"Strawberry" is a song co-written, produced and performed by American singer-songwriter Nicole Renée, issued as the lead single from her eponymous debut album. The song contains a sample of "Paradise" by Grover Washington Jr., and it was Renée's only song to chart on the Billboard Hot 100, peaking at #83 in 1998.

== Chart positions ==
Chart (1998)	Peak position
US Billboard Hot 100	83
US Hot R&B/Hip-Hop Singles & Tracks (Billboard)	41
