= Raw (Keith LeBlanc album) =

1990 studio album by Keith LeBlanc

Studio album and Remix album by Raw
- Released: January 1990
- Recorded: Southern Studios, London, England
- Genre: Electro
- Length: 32:28
- Label: Blanc
- Producer: Keith LeBlanc

Keith LeBlanc chronology
Stranger Than Fiction (1989)	Raw (1990)	Time Traveller (1992)

Raw is the third album by drummer Keith LeBlanc, released in January 1990 by Blanc Records. It was released under the pseudonym Raw and comprises four remixes from LeBlanc's second album Stranger Than Fiction.

== Track listing ==
All tracks are written by Keith LeBlanc.

No.	Title	Length
1.	"Breaks"	6:17
2.	"Kill the Devil"	3:07
3.	"Mad Dub" ("Mechanical Movements" remix)	3:33
4.	"On the System"	2:19
5.	"Green Theory"	3:47
6.	"Go Go Dub" ("Dreamworld" remix)	3:06
7.	"Speaker" ("Comedy of Errors" remix)	4:56
8.	"Ending" ("Steps" remix)	4:54

== Personnel ==
Musicians

- Gary Clail – vocals (4)
- Andy Fairley – vocals (4)
- David Harrow – keyboards (1–3, 5, 7, 8)
- Keith LeBlanc – drums, percussion, producer, mixing (1–5, 7, 8)
- Bonjo Iyabinghi Noah – percussion (8)
- Bim Sherman – vocals (5, 7)

Technical personnel

- Andy Montgomery – engineering
- Dave Pine – engineering, mixing (8)
- Adrian Sherwood – engineering, mixing (1–7)

== Release history ==
Region	Date	Label	Format	Catalog
United Kingdom	1990	Blanc	CD, LP	BLC 2
