= Strange Thing =

"Strange Thing" may refer to:

== Music ==
- "Strange Thing", single by Buzzcocks Shelley, 1980
- "Strange Thing", song by John Holt, 1971
- "Strange Thing (Mystifying)" by Murray Head, 1970
- "Strange Thing", song by Oasis from Live Demonstration

== See also ==
- Strange Things, 1990 album by Tackhead
- Stranger Things (disambiguation)
