= Freakatorium =

Freakatorium may refer to:

- Freakatorium, a museum of side show curiosities opened by Johnny Fox
- Freakatorium (album), a 1999 album by Keith LeBlanc
