= The Game (You'll Never Walk Alone) =

Single by Tackhead
- Released: 1987
- Genre: Funk, industrial
- Length: 4:43
- Label: 4th & B'way
- Songwriter(s): Oscar Hammerstein, Keith LeBlanc, Richard Rodgers, Adrian Sherwood, Doug Wimbish
- Producer(s): Tackhead

Tackhead singles chronology
"Mind at the End of the Tether" (1986)	"The Game (You'll Never Walk Alone)" (1987)	"Reality" (1988)

"The Game (You'll Never Walk Alone)" is a single by the industrial hip-hop group Tackhead, released in 1987 on 4th & B'way Records.

== Formats and track listing ==
All songs written by Oscar Hammerstein, Keith LeBlanc, Richard Rodgers, Adrian Sherwood and Doug Wimbish

UK 12" single (12BRW 65)

1. "The Game (You'll Never Walk Alone)" (feat. Brian Moore) – 4:43
2. "The Game (You'll Never Walk Alone)" (instrumental chants) – 3:00
3. "The Game (You'll Never Walk Alone)" (feat. Ronnie and Margaret) – 3:43
4. "The Game (You'll Never Walk Alone)" (Political mix) – 3:59

UK 7" single (BRW 65)

1. "The Game (You'll Never Walk Alone)" (feat. Brian Moore) (edit) – 3:54
2. "The Game (You'll Never Walk Alone)" (feat. Ronnie and Margaret) – 3:43

US 12" single (BWAY 445)

1. "The Game (You'll Never Walk Alone)" (dub version) – 3:40
2. "The Game (You'll Never Walk Alone)" (Political mix) – 3:59
3. "The Game (You'll Never Walk Alone)" (full-time instrumental) – 6:24

1989 Australian 12" single (ATACK 121)

1. "The Game (You'll Never Walk Alone)" (feat. Brian Moore) – 4:43
2. "The Game (You'll Never Walk Alone)" (instrumental chants) – 3:00
3. "The Game (You'll Never Walk Alone)" (feat. Brian Moore) (edit) – 3:54
4. "The Game (You'll Never Walk Alone)" (Political mix) – 3:59
5. "The Game (You'll Never Walk Alone)" (dub version) – 3:40

== Personnel ==
Tackhead

- Keith LeBlanc – drums, percussion
- Skip McDonald – guitar
- Adrian Sherwood – sampler, programming
- Doug Wimbish – bass guitar

Technical personnel

- Tackhead – producer

== Charts ==
Chart (1989)	Peak position
New Zealand Singles Chart	34
