= Rooms in My Fatha's House =

Studio album by Vinx
- Released: 1991
- Genre: Jazz pop
- Label: Pangaea/I.R.S.
- Producer: Sting, Vinx, John Eden, Greg Poree

Vinx chronology
Rooms in My Fatha's House (1991)	I Love My Job (1992)

Rooms in My Fatha's House is the debut album by the American musician Vinx, released in 1991. Vinx referred to his music as "prehistoric pop" or "cross-under", claiming that it was neither rock nor world nor jazz.

Vinx supported the album by opening for Sting on his Soul Cages tour.

== Production ==
The album was produced in part by Sting, who also penned the liner notes. Sting acted as more of a caretaker of the recording sessions, allowing Vinx creative control and ensuring that there wasn't any outside interference.

Taj Mahal, Branford Marsalis, Sheryl Crow, and Herbie Hancock were among the album's guest musicians. The actor Roscoe Lee Browne appears on "While the City Sleeps". Vinx's regular band, made up of percussionists and a vocalist, was dubbed the Barkin' Feet.

== Critical reception ==
Professional ratings
Review scores
Source	Rating
AllMusic	4.5/5 stars
Chicago Tribune	3/4 stars
The Encyclopedia of Popular Music	3/5 stars
Houston Chronicle	3.5/4 stars
MusicHound R&B: The Essential Album Guide	4.5/5 stars

The Washington Post called the album "a collection of tunes that juxtapose earthy percussion with Vinx's rich, romantic, melodic baritone." The Chicago Tribune thought "Vinx does catchy uncluttered little pop tunes with a twist of jazz or worldbeat rhythms." The News-Sentinel wrote that "an array of traditional percussion instruments, with tones as rich and deep as any guitar or bass, provide the background to a vocal orchestra."

The State-Times concluded that "the songs just don't have enough variety and lyrical insight to sustain repeated listenings." The Star-Ledger determined that the songs were "a reference manual for world-beat percussion," noting that "the instrumentation on 'Porch Light' alone includes daiko drum, djun-djun, cuica, congas, berimbaus, rubber band sticks, cabasa, gong, heco-heco and pandeiro." The Hamilton Spectator listed Rooms in My Fatha's House as the 8th best album of 1991.

AllMusic called the album "a wonderfully refreshing piece of art filled with memorable melodies, world beat percussion, unusual instrumentation, and the occasional jazz flourishes." The Encyclopedia of Popular Music considered it "an auspicious debut, merging samba, funk and hip hop with the artist's highly individual rhythmic instincts."

== Track listing ==
No.	Title	Length
1.	"Tell My Feet"
2.	"I Should Have Told Her"
3.	"My TV"
4.	"While the City Sleeps"
5.	"I'll Give My All to You"
6.	"Captain's Song"
7.	"Somehow Did You Know"
8.	"Little Queen"
9.	"Temporary Love"
10.	"Porch Light"
11.	"Don't Got to Be That Way"
12.	"A Little Bit More"
