= Nicole Renée (album) =

Studio album by Nicole Renée
- Released: September 15, 1998
- Studios: Right Track Recording (New York City); Chartmaker Studios (Malibu, CA); The Record Plant
- Genres: R&B, rock
- Length: 59:45
- Label: Atlantic
- Producers: Arif Mardin; Colin Wolfe; David Foster; Joe Mardin; Nicole Renée

Singles from Nicole Renée
- 1. "Strawberry" Released: September 15, 1998; 2. "Telephone" Released: February 23, 1999; 3. "Ain't Nothin' Changed" Released: March 9, 1999

Nicole Renée is the only studio album by American singer and songwriter Nicole Renée. It was released on September 15, 1998, via Atlantic Records. The recording sessions took place at Right Track Recording in New York City, except for the song "How Many Times", which was recorded at Chartmaker Studios in Malibu and the Record Plant. The production was primarily handled by Renée herself, who also served as executive producer together with Craig Kallman, as well as Arif Mardin, Colin Wolfe, David Foster and Joe Mardin. The album spawned three singles: "Strawberry", "Telephone" and "Ain't Nothin' Changed".

The album failed to chart, however, its lead single "Strawberry" peaked at No. 83 on the Billboard Hot 100 and No. 41 on the Hot R&B in the United States, No. 55 on the UK singles chart, No. 14 on the Official Dance Singles Chart and No. 7 on the Official Hip Hop and R&B Singles Chart in the United Kingdom, and No. 13 in New Zealand.

== Critical reception ==
Professional ratings
Review scores
Source	Rating
AllMusic	4/5 stars
Robert Christgau	(choice cut)
Entertainment Weekly	B+

The Fort Worth Star-Telegram noted that the album "combines spirituality with sexuality, and the music is as indescribable as anything Prince has done, crisscrossing every genre from R&B to rock."

== Track listing ==
No.	Title	Writer(s)	Producer(s)	Length
1.	"Telephone"	Nicole Renée Harris	Nicole Renée	4:15
2.	"Rockin' Chair"	Harris	Nicole Renée	3:42
3.	"Cocaine Lane"	Harris	Nicole Renée	2:44
4.	"Sound of Love"	Harris; Lamont Dozier	Nicole Renée	3:48
5.	"Strawberry"	Harris; Grover Washington Jr.; John Blake Jr.	Nicole Renée	3:52
6.	"Sunshine"	Harris; Bobby Womack	Nicole Renée; Larry Gold (co.)	3:52
7.	"Ain't Nothin' Changed"	Harris	Nicole Renée; Arif Mardin; Joe Mardin	4:29
8.	"Wickedness"	Harris; Yvonne Stevens; Tony Maiden	Nicole Renée	3:48
9.	"Heaven"	Harris	Nicole Renée	4:16
10.	"Seems Like Yesterday"	Harris	Nicole Renée	4:20
11.	"How Many Times"	Harris; Durrel L. Bottoms; Guy Shultz	David Foster	4:08
12.	"Ugh! (God)"	Harris; Dozier	Nicole Renée	4:17
13.	"Let Me Go"	Harris; Ernest Isley; Marvin Isley; O'Kelly Isley; Ronald Isley; Rudolph Bernard Isley; Chris Jasper	Nicole Renée; Colin Wolfe	3:35
14.	"The Boy Next Door"	Harris	Nicole Renée	3:44
15.	"Memorabilia"	Harris	Nicole Renée	4:55
Total length:				59:45

Sample credits

- Track 5 features samples from "Paradise" by Grover Washington Jr.
- Track 6 contains elements "I'm In Love" written by Bobby Womack as performed by Wilson Pickett.
- Track 8 contains elements from "Magic in Your Eyes" performed by Rufus.
- Track 13 contains an interpolation of "Let's Fall in Love" by the Isley Brothers.

== Personnel ==
- Nicole Renée Harris – vocals, guitar (track 3), arrangement (tracks: 1–7, 9, 10, 14, 15), producer (tracks: 1–10, 12–15), executive producer
- Bernie Worrell – piano (tracks: 1, 3), Hammond organ (tracks: 1, 4, 6), clavinet (track 2), Rhodes electric piano (tracks: 4, 5), Moog bass (track 4), Wurlitzer electric piano (track 6)
- Hiram Bullock – guitar (tracks: 1, 13)
- Will Lee – bass guitar (tracks: 1, 2, 5, 9, 10, 14, 15)
- Will Calhoun – cymbals & live tom drums (track 1), live drums (track 3)
- Erik Thor Steinert – drum programming (track 1)
- Michael Bearden – Wurlitzer organ (tracks: 2, 4), piano (tracks: 2, 9), ARP synthesizer (track 4), Wurlitzer electric piano (tracks: 5, 10), synth pads (track 5), Rhodes electric piano (tracks: 8, 10, 12, 13, 15), strings arrangement (track 8), organ (track 15)
- Bashiri Johnson – percussion (tracks: 2–6, 8–10, 12, 13)
- Frank Pagano – orchestra bells (tracks: 2, 5, 15), vibraphone (tracks: 5, 15)
- Yusuf M. "Joe" Mardin – drum programming (track 2), Moog bass (tracks: 6, 7), synth strings & Hammond organ (track 7), pads (track 7), arrangement & producer (track 7)
- Ronald "Head" Drayton – guitar (tracks: 3, 5, 14)
- Randy Bowland – guitar (tracks: 3, 9, 10)
- Mike Tyler – guitar (tracks: 3, 10)
- Ira Siegel – guitar (tracks: 3, 14)
- Charley Drayton – bass guitar (track 3)
- Richard "Young Lord" Frierson – drum programming (track 3)
- Melvin "Wah Wah Watson" Ragin – guitar (tracks: 4, 6, 13)
- Vincent Montana Jr. – vibraphone (track 4)
- Bernard Parker – drum programming (track 4)
- Kenneth Ascher – Rhodes electric piano (tracks: 5, 14)
- Mass Production – drum programming (track 5)
- Lamont Dozier – Rhodes electric piano (track 7)
- Leon Pendarvis – piano (track 7)
- Larry Gold – drum programming (track 7), strings conductor (track 15), co-producer (track 6)
- Doug Wimbish – bass guitar (tracks: 8, 12)
- Gene Orloff – concertmaster (tracks: 8–10, 15)
- Nat Adderley – strings conductor (track 8)
- Steve Love – guitar (track 9)
- Steve Jordan – drums (track 9)
- Arif Mardin – strings arrangement (tracks: 9, 10), strings conductor (track 10), arrangement & producer (track 7)
- David Foster – keyboards & arrangement (track 11), producer (track 11)
- Al McKay – guitar (track 11)
- Vinnie Colaiuta – drums (track 11)
- Glen Woodward – synths programming (track 11)
- Leon Askew – Rhodes electric piano (track 12)
- Colin Wolfe – bass & drum programming (track 13), producer (track 13)
- Rob "Reef" Tewlow – drum programming (track 14)
- Uri Caine – piano (track 15)
- Chieli Minucci – guitar (track 15)

Production

- Al Machera – recording
- Bruce Swedien – mixing
- Kenny Ortiz – mixing (tracks: 1, 4, 6–8, 13, 15), additional engineering
- Axel Niehaus – mixing (tracks: 2, 3, 5, 10, 12, 14)
- Felipe Elgueta – engineering (track 11)
- Humberto Gatica – engineering (track 11)
- John Wydrycs – additional engineering
- Jon Smeltz – additional engineering
- Michael O'Reilly – additional engineering
- Tony Prendatt – additional engineering
- Brian Garten – additional engineering
- Alex Olsson – engineering assistant
- Ann Mincieli – engineering assistant
- Brian Dozoretz – engineering assistant
- David Swope – engineering assistant
- Ethan Schofer – engineering assistant
- Greg Pinto – engineering assistant
- Jason Stasium – engineering assistant
- Pete Karam – engineering assistant
- Robert Burnette – engineering assistant
- Bernie Grundman – mastering
- Craig Kallman – executive producer
- Gloria Gabriel – production coordinator
- Richard Bates – creative director
- Elizabeth Barrett – art direction, design
- Darren Keith – photography
- Julie Friedman – A&R
- Susan Moses – stylist
- Oscar James – hair stylist
- Isabelle – make-up
