= Vinx De'Jon Parrette =

Vinx

Background information
- Born: Vincent De Jean Parrette; 15 December 1957 (age 68); Fairfield, California
- Genres: Pop, rock
- Occupation: Musician
- Instruments: Percussion, Voice
- Years active: 1980s–present
- Labels: Pangaea/I.R.S., Dreamsicle
- Member of: Jungle Funk
- Website: vinx.com

Vinx De'Jon Parrette (born 15 December 1957), known professionally as Vinx, is a percussionist, singer, songwriter, and former athlete.

== Musical career ==
Vinx performed for the first time at Montreux Jazz Festival on July 9, 1978, after legendary musician Taj Mahal invited him to perform with him at Casino Montreux.

Vinx was a member of the Austin, Texas funk & soul band Extreme Heat.

The next time Vinx performed at Montreux Jazz Festival would be July 20, 1990, when he performed nine of his own songs: The songs were taken from Vinx's first album, Rooms in My Fatha's House which was released through Sting's record label Pangaea Records, and featured guest vocals and bass by Sting. Taj Mahal, Branford Marsalis, Sheryl Crow, and Herbie Hancock were also among the album's guest musicians. The actor Roscoe Lee Browne appears on "While the City Sleeps". Vinx's regular band, made up of percussionists and a vocalist, was dubbed the Barkin' Feet.

1	Tell My Feet
2	Porch Light
3	I Should Have Told Her
4	Little Queen
5	I'd Give My All To You
6	Captain's Song
7	My TV
8	Temporary Love
9	Samba De Whoop

The following day, July 21, Vinx performed a second show at Montreux 1990 alongside Sting.

Almost a year later, on July 2, 1991 Vinx returned to Montreux Jazz Festival with Sting, as part of Sting's Soul Cages tour, performing backing vocals on 17 songs, before moving front of stage to perform vocals and percussion on four of his own songs in support of Rooms in My Fatha's House : "My Funny Valentine" (written by Richard Rogers & Lorenz Hart), "Temporary Love", "One Pearl", and "Don't Got To Be That Way". "Temporary Love" and "Don't Got To Be That Way."

Vinx's second album, I Love My Job was released on CD and cassette across Europe and the US in 1992.

In 1992, Vinx's third Album, The Storyteller, was also released through Pangaea Records and featured his drum band, The Barking Feet, plus guest artists; Stevie Wonder, Cassandra Wilson, Omar, Ndugu Chancler, Billy Kent, Django Porter, Peter Usi Wegner, Mitchell Long, Luis Conte, George Howard, Harvey Mason, Greg Poree, Karen Briggs, Angel Figueroa, Bill Summers, Basil Fung, Fade and Beulah.

On October 18 1996, Vinx opened for Carlos Santana at The Beacon Theater in New York City.

On January 12, 1997, Vinx performed in Foxborough, MASSACHUSETTS, in 20-degree weather, during halftime of the AFC Championship Game between the Jacksonville Jaguars vs The New England Patriots. Al Pereira photographed Vinx in winter gloves trying to keep warm.

On July 15, 1997, Vinx again performed at the Montreux Jazz Festival, this time as part of his band Jungle Funk, formed with Living Colour band members Doug Wimbish and Will Calhoun. Jungle Funk performed to an audience of 4000 at Auditorium Stravinski. Jungle Funk toured for many months, with dates including Drum Fest - Oopole, Poland in October 2013 and the Millennium Stage at The Kennedy Center, on January 14, 2015

In 2004, Vinx wrote and recorded Digga Tunnah Dance with Lebo M for The Lion King 1½ film and soundtrack. The album was released by Walt Disney Records in 2004.

Vinx founded a critically acclaimed songwriting/creativity workshop series called Songwriter Soul Kitchen.

In February 2024, Vinx took his International Serenade Festival to Accra, Ghana, performing with backing from the Ghana Jazz Collective at +233 Jazz Bar & Grill. Other artists to perform at the Festival included Loretta E, Purple Haze, DeGate Zion and Shelley Nicole.

== Athletics career ==
Vinx was a top American college triple jump athlete, representing Kansas State. In 1980 he held the US indoor collegiate record at 17.03 meters. This was a long enough jump to qualify him for the 1980 US Summer Olympic team in Moscow, but US President Carter boycotted the Olympics when the Soviet Union failed to withdraw its troops from Afghanistan. Vinx's Olympic dreams were shattered, alongside the whole of the US Summer Olympic team.

== Discography ==
=== As leader ===
- Rooms in My Fatha's House (PANGAEA/I.R.S., 1991)
- I Love My Job (PANGAEA/I.R.S., 1991)
- The Storyteller (PANGAEA/I.R.S., 1992)

=== As sideman ===
- Sting, The Soul Cages (A&M, 1990)
- Cassandra Wilson, Blue Light 'til Dawn (Blue Note 1993)
- Stevie Wonder, Conversation Peace (Motown, 1995)
- Crystal Waters, Crystal Waters (Mercury, 1997)

As writer

- Tom Jones - "Touch My Heart"
- Will Downing - "Don't Talk To Me like That"

== See also ==
- Jungle Funk
