= Freakatorium (album) =

Studio album by Keith LeBlanc
- Released: March 9, 1999
- Genre: Electro
- Length: 57:31
- Label: Blanc
- Producer: Keith LeBlanc

Keith LeBlanc chronology
Time Traveller (1992)	Freakatorium (1999)	Stop the Confusion (Global Interference) (2005)

Freakatorium is the fifth album by American drummer Keith LeBlanc, released on March 9, 1999 by Blanc Records.

== Track listing ==
All tracks are written by Keith LeBlanc and Skip McDonald, except where noted.

No.	Title	Writer(s)	Length
1.	"Scream"		4:24
2.	"Freaktime"		5:59
3.	"When Bugs Come Out"		4:35
4.	"A-levels"		3:46
5.	"Here to Go"		3:40
6.	"Mars Car"		5:30
7.	"Big Time"		3:01
8.	"New Frontier"		7:09
9.	"Uncut Funk"	Keith LeBlanc, Skip McDonald, Doug Wimbish	3:49
10.	"Noom"		3:09
11.	"In Between the Cracks"	Michael Mondesir	2:28
12.	"Play What You Want" (instrumental version)	Keith LeBlanc, Skip McDonald, Doug Wimbish	4:23
13.	"Freak Dub"		5:38

== Personnel ==
Musicians

- Keith LeBlanc – drums, drum programming, percussion, keyboards, vocals, producer, mixing (2, 3, 6, 8–10, 12)
- Skip McDonald – guitar, bass guitar, keyboards, harp, mixing (8)
- Michael Mondesir – bass guitar (4)
- Doug Wimbish – bass guitar (2, 3, 5, 9, 12, 13)

Technical personnel

- Darren Grant – mixing (6, 8)
- Adrian Sherwood – mixing (1, 3–5, 7, 9, 11–13), remix (13)

== Release history ==
Region	Date	Label	Format	Catalog
United Kingdom	1999	Blanc	CD	BLC 16CD
