= No Sell Out =

Single by Malcolm X
- B-side: "No Sell Out" (instrumental ver.)
- Released: November 14, 1983
- Recorded: Sweet Mountain Studio, Englewood, NJ
- Genre: Hip hop, electro
- Length: 5:44
- Label: Tommy Boy
- Songwriters: Keith LeBlanc and Malcolm X
- Producer: Keith LeBlanc

Keith LeBlanc singles chronology
"No Sell Out" (1983)	"'Support the Miners'" (1984)

"No Sell Out" is a hip hop piece composed by American drummer Keith LeBlanc and credited to Malcolm X, released in November 1983 on Tommy Boy Records. It marked one of the earliest usages of sample-based composition in popular music as well as being the first hip hop song to use Malcolm X's voice for artistic and political reasons.

== Background ==
The idea for the piece was originally conceived when LeBlanc heard Grandmaster Flash playing a record in conjunction with the sample "Do you feel lucky, punk?" taken from the 1971 action film Dirty Harry. In an interview with The Quietus, Leblanc recalled: "I just thought the combination of a beat and music and spoken word over the top of it was pretty magical to me." Leblanc began listening to Malcolm X's spoken word recordings while experimenting with different drum beats.

The recording marked LeBlanc's first time working extensively with drum machines and as a producer, with the project being financed by Marshall Chess. LeBlanc opted to use the newest gear affordable, using an Oberheim DMX and E-mu Drumulator to create and program the music. The spoken word passages were used with the permission of Betty Shabazz, with a percentage of the proceeds going to the family of Malcolm X. Previous to contacting Tommy Boy Records, LeBlanc wanted Sugar Hill Records to issue the recording, but was discouraged by their unwillingness to provide royalties to Malcolm's family.

== Composition ==
The composition makes use of several samplings of Malcolm X's voice which are placed over a syncopated beat-box driven electro beat. The audio clips are primarily taken from the speech he gave after the firebombing of his house. The song is punctuated by the spoken chorus "Malcolm X - no sell out", which is repeated several times in the duration of the track.

== Release and reception ==
Professional ratings
Review scores
Source	Rating
Allmusic	4.5/5 stars

Some were initially perturbed by the idea of a white musician using the words of an African-American activist in a popular music song. Others objected to the use of Malcolm X's words in popular music, with Jim Gates, vice president of operations at WESL in East St. Louis, Illinois, telling Billboard that he thought that "Malcolm would never have approved of putting himself in a dance music context in lounges, taverns, discos, and rock and soul stations." LeBlanc, who hadn't considered the response his music would generate, said, "I got press calling me from all over the world, all pissed off, I thought 'OK, maybe this was a little bit cutting edge!" However, some realized the musical and political importance of LeBlanc's composition and the song received acclaim in underground circles. Betty Shabazz, an American civil rights advocate and Malcolm X's widow, was aware of her husband's rising influence on members of the hip hop community and sanctioned the use of Malcolm's speech. Her preface to the piece, which appears the vinyl's jacket:

This recording documents Malcolm's voice at a time and space in history some nineteen or more years ago. Its meaning is just as relevant today as it was then. His belief is that people must constantly monitor behavior, refine goals, and direct their objectives to insure that the right to life and work is a reality. Ultimately, our goals should be peace and brotherhood. After all, the universe belongs to all its inhabitants.

Nelson George, writing in Billboard, commented, "Tommy Boy Records should be saluted for releasing a most historic and memorable record about Malcolm X. ... [T]his writer hopes it reaches a wide audience. LeBlanc has done an amazing job of capturing the essence of Malcolm X's intellectual street raps, bringing this messenger's message to a new generation of listeners."

After the single's release, Sugar Hill Records sued Tommy Boy Records for infringement, claiming the record company profited from voice samples that belonged to them. A temporary restraining order prevented Tommy Boy from marketing the single until the two record companies reached a settlement in which Tommy Boy agreed to pay Sugar Hill a percentage of sales revenue from the record.

The single was a hit in the club scene and received airplay in the UK. People magazine described the piece as "nothing if not provocative" that "succeed[s] in reminding the listener of the challenging directness of Malcolm's rhetoric." British music magazines Sounds, Melody Maker and the New Musical Express made "No Sell Out" their "Single of the Week" and ran terse summaries of Malcolm X's political career alongside their review. Jon Savage of New Society commented that "rarely has a record so united the pop press", further commenting that "this extraordinary record has redefined dance forms in the way that Grandmaster Flash's Wheels of Steel did two years ago, taking the cut-ups of current New York styles to one logical conclusion".

The single was re-issued a year later as a tribute to the UK miners' strike of 1984 and 1985.

=== Accolades ===
Publication	Country	Accolade	Year	Rank
The Face	United Kingdom	Singles of the Year	1984	4
NME	United Kingdom	Singles of the Year	1984	12
Dave Marsh	United States	1001 Greatest Singles Ever Made	1989	994
ego trip	United States	Singles of the Year (1983)	1999	28
Robert Dimery	United States	10,001 Songs You Must Hear	2014	*

(*) designates unordered lists.

== Influence ==
The song "No Sell Out" represented a shift toward more politically conscious topics in the hip hop community. It was released on the heels of the single "How We Gonna Make the Black Nation Rise?" by Brother D (Daryl Aamaa Nubyahn), a song that took a nationalist stance. "No Sell Out" was the beginning of a movement in which hip hop artists motivated by political ideology, including Public Enemy, would utilize samples of Malcolm X's voice in their compositions. However, in contrast to other artists who used his voice, the single is unique in that Malcolm X receives compositional credit in the LP's liner notes and that his family received royalties generated by the single's success. It was also the first instance of a hip hop artist using a deceased individual's voice for artistic purposes.

The track was sampled by Tragedy Khadafi on his song "Black & Proud" from the 1990 album Intelligent Hoodlum, which also sampled Malcolm X.

== Formats and track listing ==
All songs written by Keith LeBlanc and Malcolm X

US 12" single (TB 840)

1. "No Sell Out" – 5:44
2. "No Sell Out" (instrumental version) – 7:09

== Personnel ==
Adapted from the No Sell Out liner notes.

Music personnel

- Reggie Griffin – bass guitar, rhythm guitar, Minimoog, Voyetra-8
- Keith LeBlanc – Oberheim DMX, E-mu Drumulator, Minimoog, Voyetra-8, producer
- Malcolm X – spoken word

Technical personnel

- Robert Haggins – photography
- Chris Lord-Alge – mixing
- Herb Powers Jr. – mastering
- Eric Thorngren – engineering

== Charts ==
Chart (1984)	Peak position
UK Singles (OCC)	60

== Release history ==
Region	Date	Label	Format	Catalog
United States	1983	Tommy Boy	LP	TB 840
United Kingdom	1984	Island	LP	IS 165
United States	1993	Tommy Boy	CD	TBCD 840
