= Ticking Time Bomb =

Single by Tackhead

from the album Friendly as a Hand Grenade
- B-side: "Body to Burn"
- Released: March 1989
- Genre: Funk, industrial
- Length: 4:23 (album version); 2:50 (single version)
- Label: World
- Songwriter(s): Keith LeBlanc, Skip McDonald, Adrian Sherwood, Doug Wimbish
- Producer(s): Tackhead

Tackhead singles chronology
"Reality" (1988)	"Ticking Time Bomb" (1989)

Music video
- "Ticking Time Bomb" on youtube.com

"Ticking Time Bomb" is a single by the industrial hip-hop group Tackhead, released in March 1989 on World Records.

== Formats and track listing ==
All songs written by Keith LeBlanc, Skip McDonald, Adrian Sherwood and Doug Wimbish

UK 12" single (WR012)

1. "Ticking Time Bomb" – 2:50
2. "Ticking Time Bomb (dub version)" – 6:18
3. "Body to Burn" – 3:09

== Personnel ==
Tackhead

- Keith LeBlanc – drums, percussion
- Skip McDonald – guitar
- Adrian Sherwood – sampler, programming
- Doug Wimbish – bass guitar

Technical personnel

- Jill Mumford – design
- Tackhead – producer

== Charts ==
Chart (1989)	Peak position
UK Indie Chart	7
