= Jungle Funk =

Drum and bass group

Background information
- Genres: Drum and bass, funk, R&B
- Years active: 1996–present
- Labels: ESC
- Members: Will Calhoun; Vinx De'Jon Parrette; Doug Wimbish

Jungle Funk is a drum and bass group formed by Vinx De'Jon Parrette, Will Calhoun and Doug Wimbish. Beginning in 1996, they performed over one hundred and fifty shows throughout Europe and Australia. The trio performed a complex hybrid of R&B, drum and bass, dub, funk, and soul music, buttressed by sampling and electronic percussion. In 1998, they released their eponymously titled debut album Jungle Funk, which consisted of a recording of their live performance in Austria.

== History ==
After Living Colour first dissolved in 1995, bassist Doug Wimbish and drummer Will Calhoun were still interested in working together. Vinx had previously played Afropop and jazz with Herbie Hancock, and Meshell Ndegeocello and Sting. Together they formed Jungle Funk in 1996 and performed live around Europe. In 1998 they were signed to German music label ESC Records, who issued their only album Jungle Funk. The live album was recorded in April and featured guest appearances by musicians Pete Holdsworth, Keith LeBlanc and Skip McDonald.

They received critical acclaim for their ability to employ complex digital loops, sampling, and electronic percussion in a live setting, free of overdubs. Music author Chris Jisi said, "the innovative trio combines state-of-the-art technology, quality songs, and serious musicianship, all with a club-savvy dance sensibility. The resulting shows and eponymous live album are collages of high-energy drum 'n' bass and hip-hop grooves, smooth, passionate vocals, and heady sonic improvisation." The members have since become involved in other projects, with Doug and Will returning to Living Colour and Vinx touring as a solo act. In 2013, the band regrouped and began touring regularly again. In 2014, they began issuing newly recorded studio material through ReverbNation.

== Discography ==
Albums

- Jungle Funk (ESC, 1998)
