= As the Veneer of Democracy Starts to Fade =

Studio album by Mark Stewart
- Released: November 1985
- Genre: Industrial, post-punk, noise
- Length: 39:12
- Label: Mute
- Producer: Adrian Sherwood, Mark Stewart

Mark Stewart chronology
Learning to Cope with Cowardice (1983)	As the Veneer of Democracy Starts to Fade (1985)	Mark Stewart + Maffia (1986)

Professional ratings
Review scores
Source	Rating
AllMusic	4/5 stars

As the Veneer of Democracy Starts to Fade is the second album by British singer Mark Stewart, released in 1985 through Mute Records.

== Reception ==
John Leland at Spin said the album was "removed from the realm of music and in an electronic theater of guerrilla news reportage. Despite a steady beat provided by the Maffia, the album sounds less like dance music than the end of the world. Its a scary mess of random sounds, spoken words, and tiny snippets of music, processed and distorted to a grating, electric edge."

== Accolades ==
Year	Publication	Country	Accolade	Rank	Ref.
1985	Rockerilla	Italy	"Albums of the Year"	18	

== Track listing ==
All tracks are written by Mark Stewart.

Side one
No.	Title	Length
1.	"Passcivecation Program"	7:06
2.	"Bastards"	5:26
3.	"The Resistance of the Cell"	5:21
4.	"[untitled]"	0:44

Side two
No.	Title	Length
1.	"As the Veneer of Democracy Starts to Fade"	5:37
2.	"Hypnotized"	5:51
3.	"Slave of Love"	4:46
4.	"The Waiting Room"	4:18

CD Version
No.	Title	Length
1.	"Passcivecation Program"	7:06
2.	"Bastards"	5:26
3.	"The Resistance of the Cell"	5:21
4.	"[untitled]"	0:44
5.	"As the Veneer of Democracy Starts to Fade"	5:37
6.	"Pay It All Back"	4:29
7.	"Hypnotized"	5:51
8.	"Slave of Love"	4:46
9.	"The Waiting Room"	4:18
10.	"Hypnotized" (remix)	7:25
11.	"Dreamers"	6:30

== Personnel ==
Mark Stewart and the Maffia

- Mark Stewart – vocals, production
- Keith LeBlanc – drums
- Skip McDonald – guitar
- Adrian Sherwood – keyboards, production
- Doug Wimbish – bass

Additional musicians and production

- Jill Mumford – design
- Tim Young – mastering

== Charts ==
Chart (1985)	Peak position
UK Indie Chart	3
