= Jerusalem (EP) =

EP by Mark Stewart and The Maffia
- Released: October 1982
- Genre: Post-punk, dub
- Length: 12:29
- Label: On-U Sound
- Producer: Adrian Sherwood

Mark Stewart chronology
Jerusalem (1982)	Learning to Cope with Cowardice (1983)

Jerusalem is an EP by British singer Mark Stewart, released in 1982 through On-U Sound Records.

== Accolades ==
Year	Publication	Country	Accolade	Rank
1982	Rockerilla	Italy	"Singles of the Year"	1

== Track listing ==
All tracks are written by Mark Stewart, except where noted.

Side one
No.	Title	Writer(s)	Length
1.	"Jerusalem"	William Blake/Hubert Parry	3:44
2.	"High Ideals and Crazy Dreams"		3:08

Side two
No.	Title	Length
2.	"Liberty City"	5:37

== Personnel ==
Musicians

- The Maffia
  - Desmond "Fatfingers" Coke – keyboards
  - Charles "Eskimo" Fox – drums
  - Evar Wellington – bass guitar
- Mark Stewart – vocals, art direction

Additional musicians and production

- George Oban – bass guitar on "Liberty City" and "Jerusalem"
- Nick Plytas – keyboards on "Liberty City"
- Adrian Sherwood – production
