= What's My Mission Now? =

Single by Tackhead
- B-side: "Now What?"
- Released: October 1985
- Genre: Funk, industrial
- Length: 7:30
- Label: On-U Sound
- Songwriter(s): Keith LeBlanc, Skip McDonald, Adrian Sherwood, Doug Wimbish
- Producer(s): Adrian Sherwood

Tackhead singles chronology
"What's My Mission Now?" (1985)	"Mind at the End of the Tether" (1986)

"What's My Mission Now?" is a single by the American industrial hip-hop group Tackhead, released in October 1985 on On-U Sound. Scott Becker of Option called it "Sherwood as his outrageous best: wild stereo effects, a crucial beat, a bit of dubbing-it-up, found vocals (in this instance, used largely to poke fun at the military), odd sounds, the works."

== Formats and track listing ==
All songs written by Keith LeBlanc, Skip McDonald, Adrian Sherwood and Doug Wimbish

UK 12" single (ON-U DP 13)

1. "What's My Mission Now?" – 7:30
2. "Now What?" – 6:38

== Personnel ==
- Keith LeBlanc – drums, percussion
- Skip McDonald – guitar
- Adrian Sherwood – sampler, programming, producer
- Doug Wimbish – bass guitar

== Charts ==
Chart (1987)	Peak position
UK Indie Chart	9
