= Stranger than Fiction (Keith LeBlanc album) =

Stranger Than Fiction

Studio album by Keith LeBlanc
- Released: 1989
- Recorded: Matrix, London, Sanctuary, New York and Southern, London
- Genre: Funk, industrial
- Length: 44:09
- Label: Nettwerk; Enigma; Yellow Ltd.
- Producer: Keith LeBlanc

Keith LeBlanc chronology
Major Malfunction (1986)	Stranger Than Fiction (1989)	Raw (1990)

Professional ratings
Review scores
Source	Rating
AllMusic	3/5 stars

Stranger Than Fiction is the second album by drummer Keith LeBlanc, released in 1989 by Nettwerk in Canada, Enigma Records in the U.S., and Yellow Ltd. in Europe. LeBlanc has also made it available for download on his Bandcamp page.

== Track listing ==
All songs written by Keith LeBlanc unless indicated.

No.	Title	Writer(s)	Length
1.	"But Whitey"		1:37
2.	"Einstein"		3:56
3.	"Taxcider"	LeBlanc; Bernard Alexander; Doug Wimbish	3:54
4.	"Here's Looking at You"		3:34
5.	"Steps"	LeBlanc; Alexander; Wimbish	5:50
6.	"Count This"	LeBlanc; Alexander; Wimbish	4:00
7.	"Whatever"		1:49
8.	"Men in Capsules"		2:50
9.	"Dreamworld"	LeBlanc; Alexander; Wimbish; Adrian Sherwood	4:43
10.	"These Sounds"		1:06
11.	"Mechanical Movements"		4:53
12.	"Comedy of Errors"	LeBlanc; Lenny Bruce	5:57

12 was not included on the original Nettwerk CD release.

== Personnel ==
Musicians

- Gary Clail – vocals (4, 8)
- Andy Fairley – vocals (3, 4, 8)
- Keith LeBlanc – drums, percussion, producer, mixing
- Skip McDonald – guitar (2, 3, 5, 6, 9), keyboards (5, 6, 9), bass guitar (6)
- Bonjo Iyabinghi Noah – percussion (5, 10)
- Doug Wimbish – bass guitar (4, 6, 9)

Additional personnel

- Black Box – vocals (4)
- Wendell Brooks – saxophone (6)
- Lenny Bruce – spoken word (12)
- Adrian Sherwood – mixing
- Kishi Yamamoto – vocals (9)

== Release history ==
Region	Date	Label	Format	Catalog
United States	1989	Engima	CD, LP	7 7336-1
Canada	1989	Nettwerk	CD, LP	W1-30032
Germany	1989	Yellow Ltd.	LP	EFA 02244
