= Learning to Cope with Cowardice =

Studio album by Mark Stewart and The Maffia
- Released: May 1983
- Recorded: 1981–1983
- Studio: Various: Berry Street Studio; (London, England); Southern Studios; (London, England)
- Genre: Post-punk, dub, experimental
- Length: 40:34
- Label: On-U Sound
- Producer: Adrian Sherwood and Mark Stewart

Mark Stewart chronology
Jerusalem (1982)	Learning to Cope with Cowardice (1983)	As the Veneer of Democracy Starts to Fade (1985)

Professional ratings
Review scores
Source	Rating
AllMusic	4.5/5 stars
Mojo	4/5 stars
Pitchfork	7.0/10
PopMatters	8/10
Q	4/5 stars
Spin Alternative Record Guide	9/10

Learning to Cope with Cowardice is the debut album by British singer Mark Stewart, released in 1983 by On-U Sound Records. It was released on CD in 1991 with bonus tracks, as a Director's Cut CD in 2006 by EMI with other bonus tracks and versions, and then in 2019 by Mute as a 2LP/2CD set, combining the original album with the bonus album The Lost Tapes.

== Accolades ==
Year	Publication	Country	Accolade	Rank
1998	The Wire	United Kingdom	"100 Records That Set the World on Fire"	*
2005	Blow Up	Italy	"600 Essential Albums"	*
2005	WOEBOT	United States	"The 100 Greatest Records Ever"	88
"*" denotes an unordered list.

== Track listing ==
All tracks are written by Mark Stewart, except where noted

Side One
No.	Title	Length
1.	"Learning to Cope with Cowardice"	6:12
2.	"Liberty City"	5:36
3.	"Blessed are Those Who Struggle"	5:13
4.	"None Dare Call It Conspiracy" (5:41 on the Director's Cut edition)	5:24

Side Two
No.	Title	Writer(s)	Length
1.	"Don't You Ever Lay Down Your Arms" (4:58 on the Director's Cut edition)	Wes Brooks	5:11
2.	"The Paranoia of Power"		5:37
3.	"To Have the Vision"		3:34
4.	"Jerusalem"	William Blake	3:44

1991 CD bonus tracks
No.	Title	Length
9.	"The Wrong Name and the Wrong Number" (Original Version)	12:00
10.	"High Ideals and Crazy Dreams"	3:08

2006 Director's Cut CD bonus tracks
No.	Title	Length
9.	"The Wrong Name and the Wrong Number" (DJ Battle)	5:04
10.	"High Ideals and Crazy Dreams"	3:08
11.	"High Ideals" (Live)	4:22
12.	"Live Paranoia"	6:47

2019 bonus album The Lost Tapes
No.	Title	Writer(s)	Length
1.	"Intro"		0:31
2.	"May I"		5:51
3.	"Conspiracy"		4:35
4.	"Jerusalem" (Prototype)	William Blake	2:23
5.	"Paranoia"		5:42
6.	"Liberty Dub"		4:17
7.	"Vision"		4:38
8.	"Cowardice Dub"		8:23
9.	"High Ideals and Crazy Dub"		4:10
10.	"The Weight"		5:40

== Personnel ==
Mark Stewart and the Maffia

- Mark Stewart – vocals, production, art direction
- Desmond "Fatfingers" Coke – keyboards
- Charles "Eskimo" Fox – drums
- Evar Wellington – bass guitar

Additional musicians and production

- Anna Hurl – art direction
- George Oban – bass guitar on "Liberty City" and "Jerusalem"
- Nick Plytas – keyboards on "Liberty City" and "None Dare Call It Conspiracy"
- Dan Sheals – drums on "Blessed Are Those Who Struggle"
- Adrian Sherwood – production
- Antonio "Crucial Tony" Phillips – bass guitar on "Blessed Are Those Who Struggle"
