= Stranger Things Have Happened =

Stranger Things Have Happened may refer to:

- Stranger Things Have Happened (Clare Maguire album)
- Stranger Things Have Happened (Justin Guarini album)
- Stranger Things Have Happened (Peter Tork album)
- Stranger Things Have Happened (Ronnie Milsap album)
- "Stranger Things Have Happened" (song), by Ronnie Milsap
- "Stranger Things Have Happened", a song by Foo Fighters from Echoes, Silence, Patience & Grace
