= Mind at the End of the Tether =

Single by Tackhead
- B-side: "King of the Beat"
- Released: 1986
- Genre: Funk, industrial
- Length: 6:40
- Label: On-U Sound
- Songwriter(s): Keith LeBlanc, Skip McDonald, Adrian Sherwood, Doug Wimbish
- Producer(s): Adrian Sherwood

Tackhead singles chronology
"What's My Mission Now?" (1985)	"Mind at the End of the Tether" (1986)	"The Game (You'll Never Walk Alone)" (1987)

"Mind at the End of the Tether" is a single by the industrial hip-hop group Tackhead, released in 1986 on On-U Sound Records. Although the record states otherwise, the B-side is actually the Fats Comet song "King of the Beat".

== Formats and track listing ==
All songs written by Keith LeBlanc, Skip McDonald, Adrian Sherwood and Doug Wimbish

UK 12" single (ON-U DP 15)

1. "Mind at the End of the Tether" – 6:40
2. "King of the Beat" – 7:46

== Personnel ==
Tackhead

- Keith LeBlanc – drums, percussion
- Skip McDonald – guitar
- Adrian Sherwood – sampler, programming, producer
- Doug Wimbish – bass guitar

Additional musicians

- DJ Cheese – scratches (B-side)

== Charts ==
Chart (1986)	Peak position
UK Indie Chart	31
