= Fats Comet =

- Origin: London, Greater London, United Kingdom
- Genres: Funk, industrial
- Years active: 1984–1987
- Labels: On-U Sound, Rough Trade, World
- Past members: Keith LeBlanc; Skip McDonald; Adrian Sherwood; Doug Wimbish

Fats Comet was a British/American industrial hip hop group formed by Adrian Sherwood, Keith LeBlanc, Skip McDonald and Doug Wimbish. The band was known for producing dance tracks that were densely layered in samples and ahead of their time. In a 1987 article in Spin, Scott Burlingham commented that "songs like "Bop Bop" and "Stormy Weather" are three years old and they still don't fit in." The members eventually shifted their focus to another project Tackhead, under which they continue to produce music.

== History ==
British music producer Adrian Sherwood first met American percussionist Keith LeBlanc in 1984 while working on a remix for the reggae group Akabu. They were joined by guitarist Skip McDonald and bassist Doug Wimbish in London. Fats Comet was originally conceived to be a studio-only project. A change in musical direction led the members to focus their attention on another project called Tackhead, which aimed at having a less commercial sound compared to Fats Comet. Sherwood explains, "the masterplan [...] was for Tackhead to take dub/funk on a journey through leftfield and into the unknown to God knows where, and then for Fats Comet to pilot the mothership smoothly back from this alternative dimension to a safe earthly landing with sounds that you would recognize instantly without ever having heard before." Although they never released a full-length album, the group's final single, "Rockchester", was a modest success in the UK.

== Discography ==
Chart placings shown are from the UK Indie Chart.

=== Singles ===
- "Bop Bop" (World, 1985)
- "Dee Jay's Dream" (World, 1985)
- "Don't Forget That Beat" (World, 1985)
- "Stormy Weather" (Rough Trade, 1985)
- "King of the Beat" (On-U Sound, 1986)
- "Rockchester" (World, 1987) (#6)
