= Nicole Renée =

American singer-songwriter

Nicole Renée, also sometimes known as Nicole Renée Harris, is an American singer, songwriter, record producer and former Teen Summit host, who is currently signed to Melodious Fool Records. Her latest single release is "You Don't Have To Buy Me Anything". Previous releases included a self-titled album on Atlantic Records in 1998. She was signed by Craig Kallman and Ahmet Ertegun. Prior to recording it, Renee wrote more than 200 songs.

Renée was trained by Gail Thomas who attended the Juilliard School. She is trained in classical music.
