= Major Malfunction =

Studio album by Keith LeBlanc
- Released: 1986
- Recorded: February 1986
- Studio: Southern Studios, London, England
- Genre: Funk, industrial, electro
- Length: 32:57
- Label: World
- Producer: Keith LeBlanc

Keith LeBlanc chronology
| Major Malfunction (1986) | Stranger Than Fiction (1989) |

Professional ratings
Review scores
| Source | Rating |
|---|---|
| Allmusic | 4.5/5 stars |

Major Malfunction is the debut album of American drummer Keith LeBlanc, produced by Fats Comet (one of several aliases of Tackhead), and released in 1986 by World Records. The vinyl release plays continuously from beginning to end on sides A and B, while the World and Cleopatra CD releases index each side as a track. This production was ground breaking in 1986 and copied by many.

Despite the almost universal reference to this album as Major Malfunction, the original cover showed Major Malfuction as the title. This was corrected on the Select Cuts reissue.

== Track listing ==
All tracks are written by Keith LeBlanc.

| No. | Title | Length |
|---|---|---|
| 1. | "Get This/Major Malfunction/Heaven on Earth/Object - Subject (Breakdown's Not Enough)" | 17:16 |
| 2. | "I'll Come Up with Something/M.O.V.E./Technology Works Dub/You Drummers Listen Good" | 15:41 |

Cleopatra Records bonus tracks
| No. | Title | Length |
|---|---|---|
| 3. | "Mad Years" | 9:28 |

The Cleopatra version was erroneously mastered, with Side 2 as track 1 and vice versa.

Select Cuts track listing
| No. | Title | Length |
|---|---|---|
| 1. | "Get This" | 2:43 |
| 2. | "Major Malfunction" | 4:47 |
| 3. | "Heaven on Earth" | 4:31 |
| 4. | "Object-Subject (Breakdown's Not Enough)" | 5:13 |
| 5. | "I'll Come Up With Something" | 3:27 |
| 6. | "M.O.V.E." | 0:48 |
| 7. | "Technology Works Dub" | 5:42 |
| 8. | "You Drummers Listen Good" | 4:41 |
| 9. | "Ending" | 1:00 |
| 10. | "Einstein" (dub version) | 2:43 |
| 11. | "Mechanical Movements" (dub version) | 2:43 |
| 12. | "Old Beat" (Master mix) | 4:47 |
| 13. | "Tick of Time" (instrumental version) | 4:31 |

== Personnel ==
Musicians

- Keith LeBlanc – drums, percussion, keyboards, editing, engineering
- Skip McDonald – guitar, keyboards, engineering
- Nick Plytas – keyboards
- Adrian Sherwood – sampler, programming, engineering, mixing
- Doug Wimbish – bass guitar, keyboards, guitar
- Dog – keyboards ("Move")

Technical personnel

- Fats Comet – producer
- Kevin Metcalfe – mastering
- Bonjo Iyabinghi Noah – percussion ("Move")

== Charts ==
| Charts (1986) | Peak position |
|---|---|
| UK Indie Chart | 11 |

== Release history ==
| Region | Date | Label | Format | Catalog |
|---|---|---|---|---|
| United Kingdom | 1986 | World | CD, LP | WR 005 |
| United States | 2003 | Cleopatra | CD | CLP 1274-2 |
| Germany | 2003 | Select Cuts | CD | SELECT CUTS 2023 |
