= Strange Things =

Studio album by Tackhead
- Released: September 1990
- Genre: Funk, industrial
- Length: 48:30
- Label: SBK
- Producer: Tackhead

Tackhead chronology
Friendly as a Hand Grenade (1989)	Strange Things (1990)	Power Inc. Volume 1 (1994)

Strange Things is the third album by Tackhead, released in 1990 through SBK Records.

== Critical reception ==
Professional ratings
Review scores
Source	Rating
AllMusic	2/5 stars
Chicago Tribune	3/4 stars
Entertainment Weekly	B
Select	2/5 medals

The St. Petersburg Times wrote that "Tackhead combines speed metal, groove-drenched dub, wah-wah guitar, acidic rap, dreamy new age and punched-up industrial to such dazzling effect that Strange Things is almost incomprehensibly complex." The Chicago Tribune determined that "Fowler's gritty voice ... and the rigid four-on-the-floor drumming are prominent in the mix, with guitars, bass and Sherwood's odd scraps of sampled sound adding tonal color."

== Track listing ==
All tracks are written by Bernard Fowler, Keith LeBlanc, Skip McDonald, Adrian Sherwood and Doug Wimbish, except where noted.

No.	Title	Writer(s)	Length
1.	"Nobody to Somebody"		4:26
2.	"Wolf in Sheeps Clothing"	Andy Fairley	6:11
3.	"Class Rock"		4:37
4.	"Dangerous Sex"	Craig Derry, Melvin Glover	4:52
5.	"Strange Things"	John Holt	3:37
6.	"Super Stupid"	George Clinton, Eddie Hazel, Lucius Ross, Billy 'Big Bass' Nelson	2:28
7.	"See the Fire Burning"		4:50
8.	"For This I Sing"	Bernard Alexander	5:50
9.	"Take a Stroll"		2:32
10.	"Change"		4:09
11.	"Positive Suggestion"		5:12

== Personnel ==
Tackhead

- Bernard Fowler – vocals
- Keith LeBlanc – drums
- Skip McDonald – guitar, vocals
- Adrian Sherwood – effects, percussion
- Doug Wimbish – bass guitar, vocals

Production and additional personnel

- Susie Davis – keyboards on "Wolf in Sheeps Clothing"
- Lisa Fischer – backing vocals
- Mick Jagger – harmonica on "Take a Stroll"
- Me Company – illustrations
- Melle Mel – vocals on "See the Fire Burning"
- Cindy Mizelle – backing vocals
- Eddie Monsoon – photography
- Jill Mumford – design
- Tackhead – producer, mixing
