= Friendly as a Hand Grenade =

Studio album by Tackhead
- Released: 1989
- Studios: Unique, NYC, and Matrix and Southern, London
- Genres: Funk, industrial
- Length: 36:12
- Labels: TVT, World
- Producer: Tackhead

Tackhead chronology
Tackhead Tape Time (1987)	Friendly as a Hand Grenade (1989)	Strange Things (1990)

Friendly as a Hand Grenade is an album by the American band Tackhead. It was released in 1989 through TVT Records.

== Production ==
The band added Bernard Fowler on vocals, and changed its name from Gary Clail's Tackhead Sound System. The album cover art is by Gee Vaucher.

== Critical reception ==
Professional ratings
Review scores
Source	Rating
AllMusic	4.5/5 stars
Chicago Tribune	2/4 stars
The Encyclopedia of Popular Music	4/5 stars
Houston Chronicle	3/4 stars
The Rolling Stone Album Guide	3.5/5 stars
Spin Alternative Record Guide	7/10

The New York Times wrote that Tackhead "draw deep, swampy grooves from funk, rap, house music and dub reggae, then add a paranoid overlay."

Trouser Press wrote: "Opening and closing with the jaunty 'Ska Trek', living up to the title of 'Demolition House' and pursuing the by-now-familiar sardonic comments on the military with the infectious 'Airborne Ranger', the album captures Tackhead at its most coherent." The Spin Alternative Record Guide declared that "at its best, the group melded deeply psychedelic rock and funk in a way that the Red Hot Chili Peppers could only dream of."

== Track listing ==
All tracks are written by Bernard Fowler, Keith LeBlanc, Skip McDonald, Adrian Sherwood and Doug Wimbish, except "Ska Trek" by Prince Buster.

No.	Title	Length
1.	"Ska Trek"	0:48
2.	"Tell Me the Hurt"	5:16
3.	"Mind and Movement"	5:23
4.	"Stealing"	6:32
5.	"Airborne Ranger"	5:01
6.	"Body to Burn"	1:04
7.	"Demolition House"	4:08
8.	"Free South Africa"	1:56
9.	"Ticking Time Bomb"	4:23
10.	"Ska Trek"	1:34

== Personnel ==
Tackhead

- Bernard Fowler – keyboards, vocals
- Keith LeBlanc – drums, percussion, drum programming, sampler
- Skip McDonald – engineering, guitar, keyboards, synthesizer, vocals
- Doug Wimbish – bass guitar, guitar, keyboards, vocals

Additional musicians and production

- Dave Pine – engineering
- Adrian Sherwood – engineering, mixing
- Tackhead – producer

== Charts ==
Chart (1989)	Peak position
UK Indie Chart	3

== Release history ==
Region	Date	Label	Format	Catalog
United Kingdom	1989	World	CD, LP	WR013
United States	1989	TVT	CD, LP	TVT 4060
Japan	1989	Alfa Records, Inc	CD	ALCA-553
