= Gary Clail =

English singer and record producer

- Born: 1959 (age 66–67)
- Genres: Electronic dance music
- Occupation: Musician
- Labels: Perfecto; RCA

Gary Clail (born 1959) is an English singer and record producer, and the founder of the Gary Clail Sound System. He was part of On-U Sound Records (and also the On-U Sound System) and led Gary Clail's Tackhead Sound System. They had a big hit in clubs with the 1991 song "Human Nature".

== Biography ==
Clail worked originally as a roofer, but during the mid- to late 1980s, based in Bristol, he became a warm-up act for On-U gigs. Clail first released a record in 1985. Several 12" singles were issued between 1985 and 1987, before Clail's first LP for Nettwerk, Tackhead Tape Time, a split effort between Clail and Tackhead. "Television: The Drug of the Nation" by The Beatnigs was remixed by Clail, Adrian Sherwood and Mark Stewart, on the Alternative Tentacles record label in 1988.

In 1989, Clail, billed as Gary Clail & On-U Sound System, released an album on the label On-U Sound, marking his entrance to the electronic underground scene in Bristol, eventually leading him to work with RCA a couple of years later. This output incorporated several singles and EPs, as well as the Emotional Hooligan album (1991).

Clail released a further album on Yelen Records, entitled Keep the Faith (1996).

In 2013, Clail formed the Gary Clail Sound System and began work on the album Nail It To The Mast. It was released on 15 December 2014.

In 2022, Clail released Violence.

== Discography ==
=== Singles ===
- Gary Clail - "Half Cut for Confidence" (1985)
- Gary Clail and Tackhead - "Hard Left" (1986)
- Tackhead / Gary Clail - "Reality" (1989)
- Gary Clail On-U Sound System featuring Bim Sherman - "Beef" (1990) – UK No. 64
- Gary Clail On-U Sound System - "Human Nature" (1991) – UK No. 10, AUS No. 38, IRE No. 27, NED No. 69
- Gary Clail On-U Sound System - "Escape" (1991) – UK No. 44, AUS No. 117
- Gary Clail On-U Sound System - "The Emotional Hooligan" (1991)
- Gary Clail On-U Sound System - "Who Pays The Piper?" (1992) – UK No. 31, AUS No. 177
- Gary Clail On-U Sound System - "These Things Are Worth Fighting For" (1993) – UK No. 45, AUS No. 157
- Gary Clail On-U Sound System - "Speak No Evil" (1993) (promotional release only)
- Gary Clail - "Another Hard Man" (1995) – UK No. 86

=== Studio albums ===
- Gary Clail On-U Sound System - End Of The Century Party (1989)
- Gary Clail On-U Sound System - Emotional Hooligan (1991) – UK No. 35, AUS No. 95
- Gary Clail On-U Sound System - Dreamstealers (1993) – AUS No. 180, NZ No. 38
- Gary Clail - Keep The Faith (1995)
- Gary Clail Soundsystem - Nail it to the Mast (2014)
- Gary Clail SoundSystem - Violence (2022)

=== Compilation albums ===
- Gary Clail - Human Nature: The Very Best of Gary Clail (1997)
