= Tackhead =

Industrial hip-hop group

- Origin: New York City, U.S.
- Genres: Industrial hip-hop; funk
- Years active: 1987–1991, 2004–present
- Labels: ON-U, Nettwerk, SBK, World
- Spinoffs: Barmy Army; Strange Parcels
- Spinoff of: Fats Comet; Dub Syndicate
- Members: Skip McDonald: Adrian Sherwood; Doug Wimbish
- Past members: Bernard Fowler: Keith LeBlanc
- Website: tackhead.com

Tackhead (styled TACK>>HEAD, sometimes known as Fats Comet) is an industrial hip-hop group that was most active during the 1980s and early 1990s, and briefly reformed in 2004 for a tour. Their music occupies the territory where funk, dub, industrial music and electronica intersect. The core members were Doug Wimbish (bass), Keith LeBlanc (percussion) and Skip McDonald (guitar) and producer (sometimes credited as "mixologist") Adrian Sherwood. Despite being short-lived as a band proper, the legacy and output of these groups of musicians has been prodigious.

== History ==
In the late 1970s, Wimbish, LeBlanc and McDonald were members of the house band for the Sugarhill Records record label and the trio of hip-hop artists known as the Sugarhill Gang. They were also the musicians playing behind DJ Grandmaster Flash's 1982 hit "The Message" (the vocal was by Melle Mel) and another hit "White Lines".

During a visit to New York City, to help with a remix, London-based producer Sherwood (already noted in the dub music scene) met LeBlanc, and they began to collaborate. Soon the trio of Wimbish, LeBlanc and McDonald were producing tracks on Sherwood's On-U Sound record label. One of their earlier collaborations was as "Mark Stewart and the Maffia", which featured Stewart, former member of Bristol’s The Pop Group, on vocals. Their first LP produced under that name As the Veneer of Democracy Starts to Fade was amongst the most industrial, noise-oriented and uncompromising of the group's output, described by John Leland as "a scary mess of random sounds, spoken words, and tiny snippets of music, processed and distorted to a grating electric edge."

Later to join forces with Tackhead was Bristol-based Gary Clail, who as MC for the touring version of the On-U sound system, would shout and rant over Tackhead's live playing, and both were then mixed live by Sherwood to produce a wall of sound effect that was highly novel for the mid-1980s. They released one LP Tackhead Tape Time in 1987 as "Gary Clail's Tackhead Sound System" and some of the most distinctive and well-known Tackhead tracks (some were released as 12-inch singles) date from this period particularly: "What's My Mission Now?", "Mind at the End of the Tether" and "Hard Left". These tracks combined funk basslines, hammerblow percussion and Sherwood's trademark sample-laden dub production and represent the defining Tackhead sound.

During this period, LeBlanc also produced two solo LPs: the highly inventive Major Malfunction (1986) (inspired by the Space Shuttle Challenger disaster) and Stranger Than Fiction (1989), which although credited to LeBlanc, featured all the rest of members of Tackhead. Around this time the group began to gel as a band, and started adding vocalists to what had been up until then a largely instrumental affair. On the first Tackhead LP proper, Friendly as a Hand Grenade, vocalist Bernard Fowler joined the line-up, and many older instrumental tracks re-appeared with lyrics, in what Trouser Press characterized as "Tackhead at its most coherent." In 1990 Tackhead mounted a world tour which probably marked the zenith of the band's commercial success.

The follow-up album, 1990's Strange Things (the first on a major label, EMI), despite some praise for harder-edge singles such as "Dangerous Sex" and "Class Rock" was not as well received by critics. Many followers of the group were disappointed by the more restrained production, less industrial and more mellow R&B elements. Yet the album was still experimental enough that it did not gain as wide an audience as had been hoped, and the band was dropped from their record label shortly after.

Despite not recording any new material as Tackhead since, group members continued to record as the backing band or along with various Sherwood-led On-U Sound productions artists such as Gary Clail's solo efforts, African Head Charge, Dub Syndicate, New Age Steppers and others. Subsets of the group have also appeared in various guises such as the Strange Parcels, Barmy Army and the blues-oriented Little Axe.

In addition to continuing to collaborate with Sherwood and the On-U Sound record label, each of the other members continues to lead active solo careers. McDonald leads the Little Axe project, and LeBlanc ran a record label and played with two jazz outfits, Noah Ground and Nikki Yeoh's Infinitum. As well as remaining much in demand as a session bass player, Wimbish later became the bass player for Living Colour and has recorded solo material as well as forming the short-lived Jungle Funk (later Head>>Fake), a live drum and bass outfit also featuring Living Colour drummer Will Calhoun.

In 2004, Tackhead briefly reformed to engage in a limited tour of North America and Europe. In April 2022, the entire group, also featuring Mark Stewart, played a short tour of the UK, comprising performances in Glasgow, Edinburgh, and London.

LeBlanc died in April 2024.

== Discography ==
Studio albums

- Tackhead Tape Time (1987)
- Friendly as a Hand Grenade (1989)
- Strange Things (1990)
- For the Love of Money (2014)
- Powerstation 2.0 (2023, Emergency Hearts)
- Powerstation 2.0 (scott crow Hard Left Remix) (2024, Emergency Hearts)
