= Industrial hip-hop =

Subgenre of hip hop

Industrial hip hop
- Other names: Industrial rap
- Stylistic origins: Industrial; hip hop; no wave; post-punk; industrial rock; post-industrial; noise
- Cultural origins: Mid-1980s, United Kingdom and United States
- Typical instruments: Vocals; rapping; guitar; bass; drums; drum machine; sampler; keyboard; synthesizer; electronics; turntables

Other topics
- Alternative hip hop; experimental hip hop

Industrial hip hop is a fusion genre of industrial music and hip hop. Originally emerging in the mid-1980s, the genre incorporates the production elements of industrial music with that of traditional hip-hop instrumentation.

== History ==
=== 1980s ===
The origins of industrial hip hop are in the work of Mark Stewart, Bill Laswell, and Adrian Sherwood. In 1985, former The Pop Group singer Mark Stewart released As the Veneer of Democracy Starts to Fade, an application of the cut-up style of industrial music, with the house band of Sugar Hill Records (Doug Wimbish, Keith LeBlanc, and Skip McDonald). In 1986, The Beatnigs were formed in San Francisco. As a collaboration between Michael Franti, Rono Tse and Kevin Carnes, The Beatnigs combined hardcore punk, industrial and hip hop influences, described as "a kind of avant-garde industrial jazz poets collective". The band's stage performance included the use of power tools such as a rotary saw on a metal bar to create industrial noise and pyrotechnics. In the late 1980s, Laswell's Material project began to take increasing influence from hip hop. Adrian Sherwood was a major figure in British dub, as well as working with industrial groups such as Cabaret Voltaire, Einstürzende Neubauten, Ministry, KMFDM, and Nine Inch Nails.

Tackhead, a collaboration between Sherwood and the Sugar Hill band, picked up where Mark Stewart left off. The Disposable Heroes of Hiphoprisy and Consolidated from San Francisco, MC 900 Ft. Jesus from Texas and Meat Beat Manifesto from the UK are also early representatives of the style. The industrial group 23 Skidoo, Miles Davis's album On the Corner, and the Nine Inch Nails single "Down in It" are also important precedents for the style.

=== 1990s ===
Industrial hip hop was carried forward by figures from a diverse number of scenes. Young Black Teenagers featured an industrial-influenced sound on their 1991 self-titled debut album, provided by the Bomb Squad, Public Enemy's production team. Perhaps the most unlikely adopters were Justin Broadrick and Mick Harris, previously known for their invention of the grindcore style of extreme metal, while in Napalm Death. After participating in the jazzcore group Pain Killer with Bill Laswell, Harris's Scorn project delved into dark ambient and industrial hip hop. Subsequently, Broadrick began to work with Kevin Martin, previously of God (also a jazzcore group). The later work of Broadrick's Godflesh, as well as his collaborations with Martin, Ice, Techno Animal, and Curse of the Golden Vampire, are prime examples of industrial hip hop. The last of these was also a collaboration with Alec Empire, from Berlin, who also participated in the style in a number of his albums.

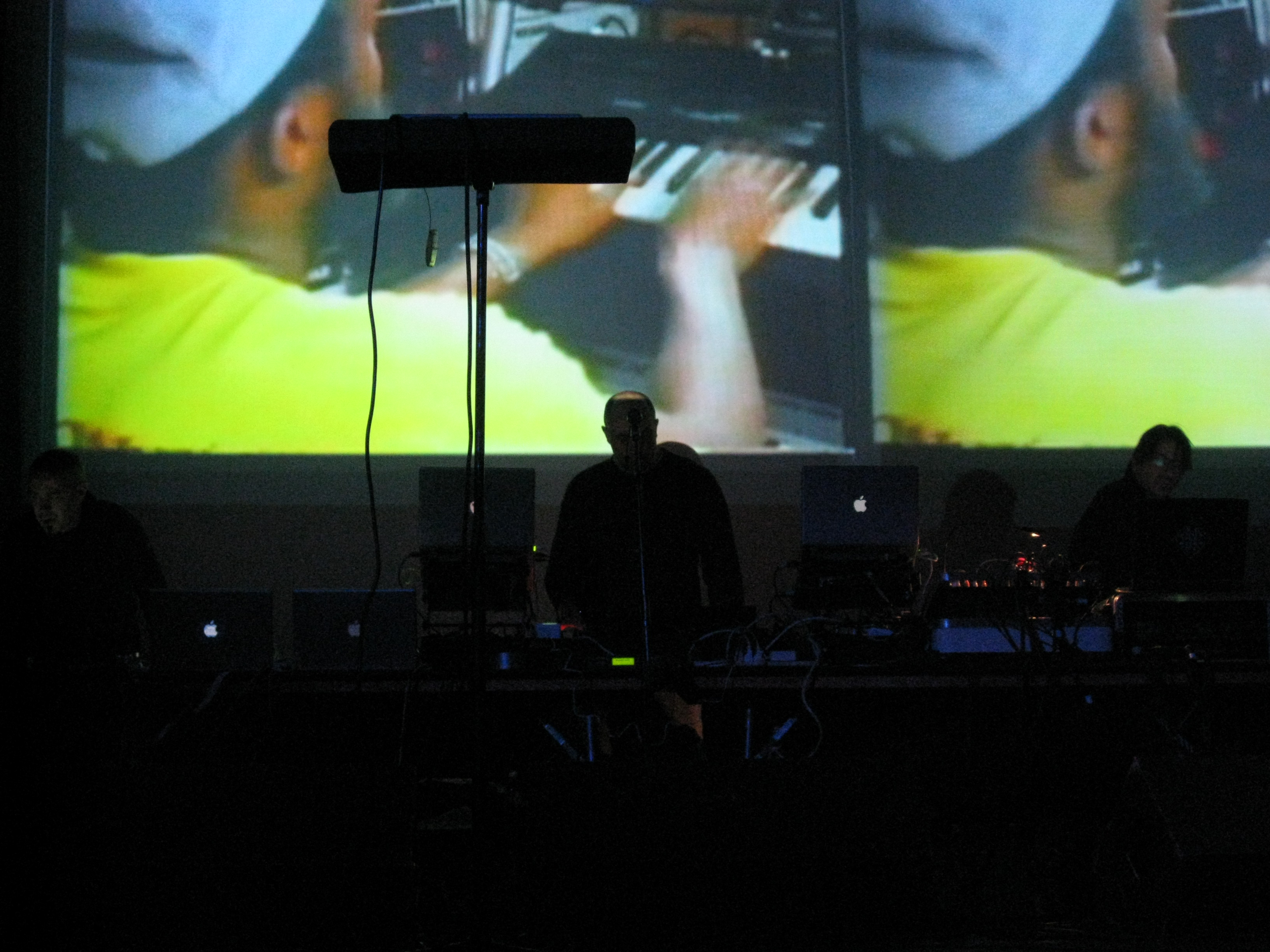
Meat Beat Manifesto live in 2008

The German label Mille Plateaux developed the sound throughout their series of Electric Ladyland compilations. Ice and Techno Animal also collaborated at times with El-P and other representatives of the Def Jux label. DJ Spooky's illbient style is closely related to these developments in industrial hip hop; Mutamassik takes influence from both, as well as from breakcore.

Industrial rock band Acumen Nation adopts hip hop influences, as does the band's side project DJ? Acucrack. A few other industrial bands that combine hip hop elements in their music are Rabbit Junk, The Mad Capsule Markets, and The Shizit, who are industrial metal and digital hardcore bands. Atari Teenage Riot have also been known to incorporate hip hop elements in some of their songs, with Carl Crack developing a distinctive MC style. In the electro-industrial/industrial metal genre there is Steril, notable for combining hip hop beats, dj scratches, and rap verses with industrial elements. The Kompressor, often uses vocal distortion in the style of many Aggrotech artists. The industrial super group The Damage Manual is known to regularly incorporate hip hop with their music, in beats and MCing. Corporate Avenger the rap metal/industrial metal band, often does industrial hip hop in their music. Stromkern combine hip hop beats with EBM-style synths and vocals. Rap rock groups Senser and Clawfinger are often grouped as industrial hip hop, due to their use of electronica with aggressive rap metal. Other acts of note would be Nettwerk Records' Consolidated, and P.O.W.E.R, as well as the Swamp Terrorists, SMP aka Sounds of Mass Production, Non-Aggression Pact, and Noisebox.

Croatian-American rapper Marz emerged from Chicago's industrial metal scene, working as an engineer on Ministry's Filth Pig (1996) and playing guitar on Dark Side of the Spoon (1999). He later pursued his own project, which featured Ministry acolytes Rey Washam and Louis Svitek.

While Broadrick chose to devote his attentions primarily to post-metal, Martin continued to apply industrial hip hop to dancehall and grime with The Bug. Jace Clayton, a Brooklyn native who expatriated to Barcelona and records under the names DJ /rupture and Nettle, is also devoted to the style, as well as to breakcore. Filastine, a former member of ¡Tchkung! who records for Clayton's Soot label, also practices a politicized variety of industrial hip hop. The French label Cavage eventually devoted itself to the style, along with the Toulouse-based group les Trolls.

=== 2000s–2020s ===
2Slimey, Antipop Consortium, Death Grips, Moodie Black, clipping., Moor Mother, JPEGMAFIA and Dälek are successful examples of contemporary industrial hip hop, as are Blades Of Hades, Ho99o9, NAH, and Saul Williams. Kanye West's Yeezus album has been described as blending industrial music with hip hop.

In 2014, Treble magazine stated that industrial hip-hop had been "dominating the conversation" in hip-hop for "the last couple years at least", identifying Death Grips and Kanye West as artists who had helped popularize it with wider audiences.
