= Doug Wimbish =

American bass player (born 1956)

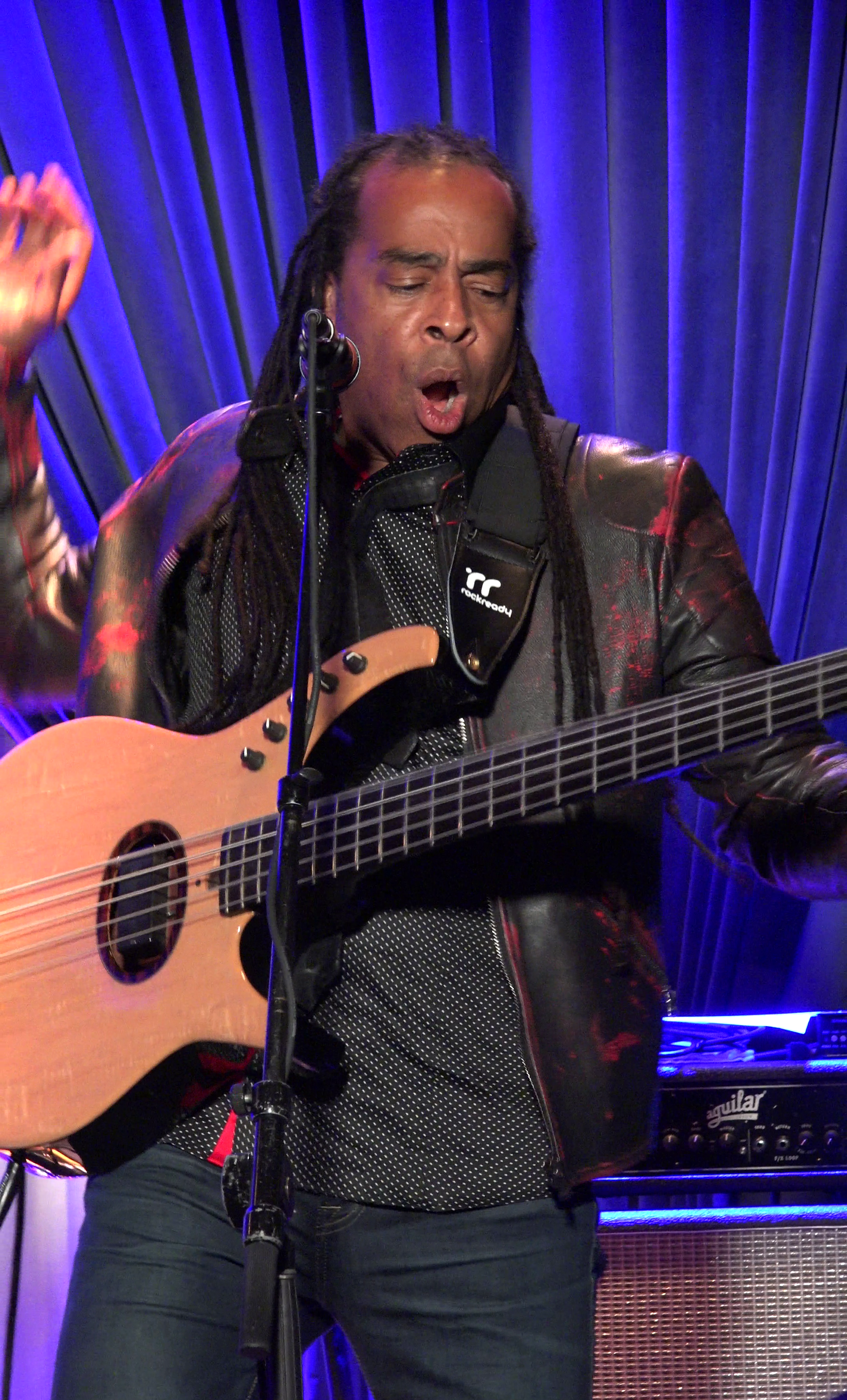
- Wimbish performing in New York City, 2016

Background information
- Born: Douglas Arthur Wimbish; September 22, 1956 (age 69); Hartford, Connecticut, U.S.
- Genres: Hard rock; funk rock; alternative metal; hip hop; industrial
- Occupations: Musician; songwriter
- Instruments: Vocals; bass guitar; guitar
- Labels: Sugarhill; Enja; On-U Sound
- Formerly of: Living Colour; Tackhead
- Website: dougwimbish.com

Douglas Arthur Wimbish (born September 22, 1956) is an American bassist, primarily known for being a member of rock band Living Colour and funk/dub/hip hop collective Tackhead, and as a session musician with artists such as Sugarhill Gang, Grandmaster Flash and the Furious Five, The Rolling Stones, Mick Jagger, Depeche Mode, James Brown, Annie Lennox, Tarja Turunen, and Barrington Levy (as well as his studio work for the rap/hip hop label Sugarhill Records and the experimental dub label On-U Sound).

== Biography and career ==
Born in Hartford, Connecticut, Wimbish started playing guitar at the age of 12 and switched to bass guitar at the age of 14. In 1979 he was hired together with guitarist Skip McDonald and drummer Keith LeBlanc to form the house rhythm section for Sugarhill Records. Although they did not play on the Sugarhill Gang's famous song "Rapper's Delight" (the rhythm tracks for this song were played by the group Positive Force), they did play on many other popular song tracks, including "The Message" by Grandmaster Flash and the Furious Five, "White Lines (Don't Don't Do It)" by Grandmaster Flash and Melle Mel, "New York City" by Grandmaster Flash and the Furious Five, and "Apache" by the Sugarhill Gang.

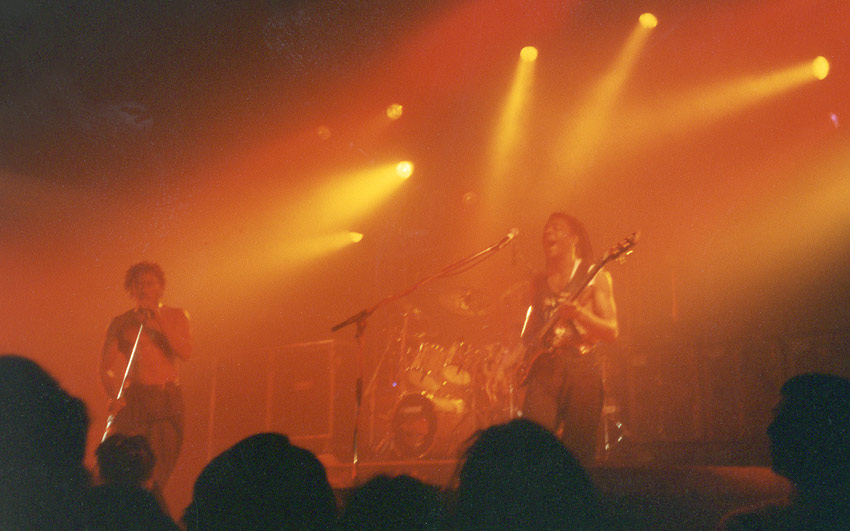
Wimbish with Living Colour, Vienna 1993

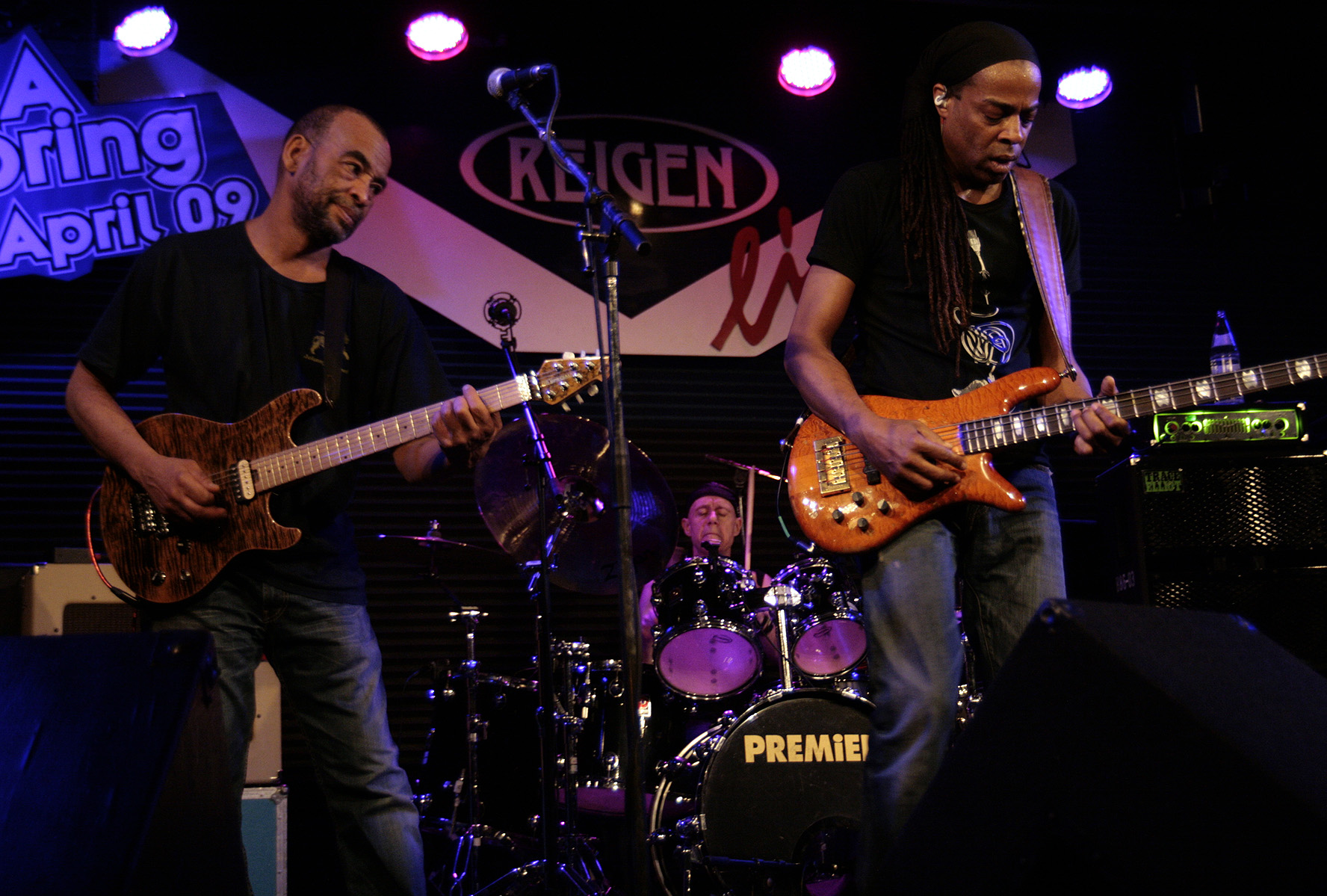
Wimbish with Little Axe (2009)

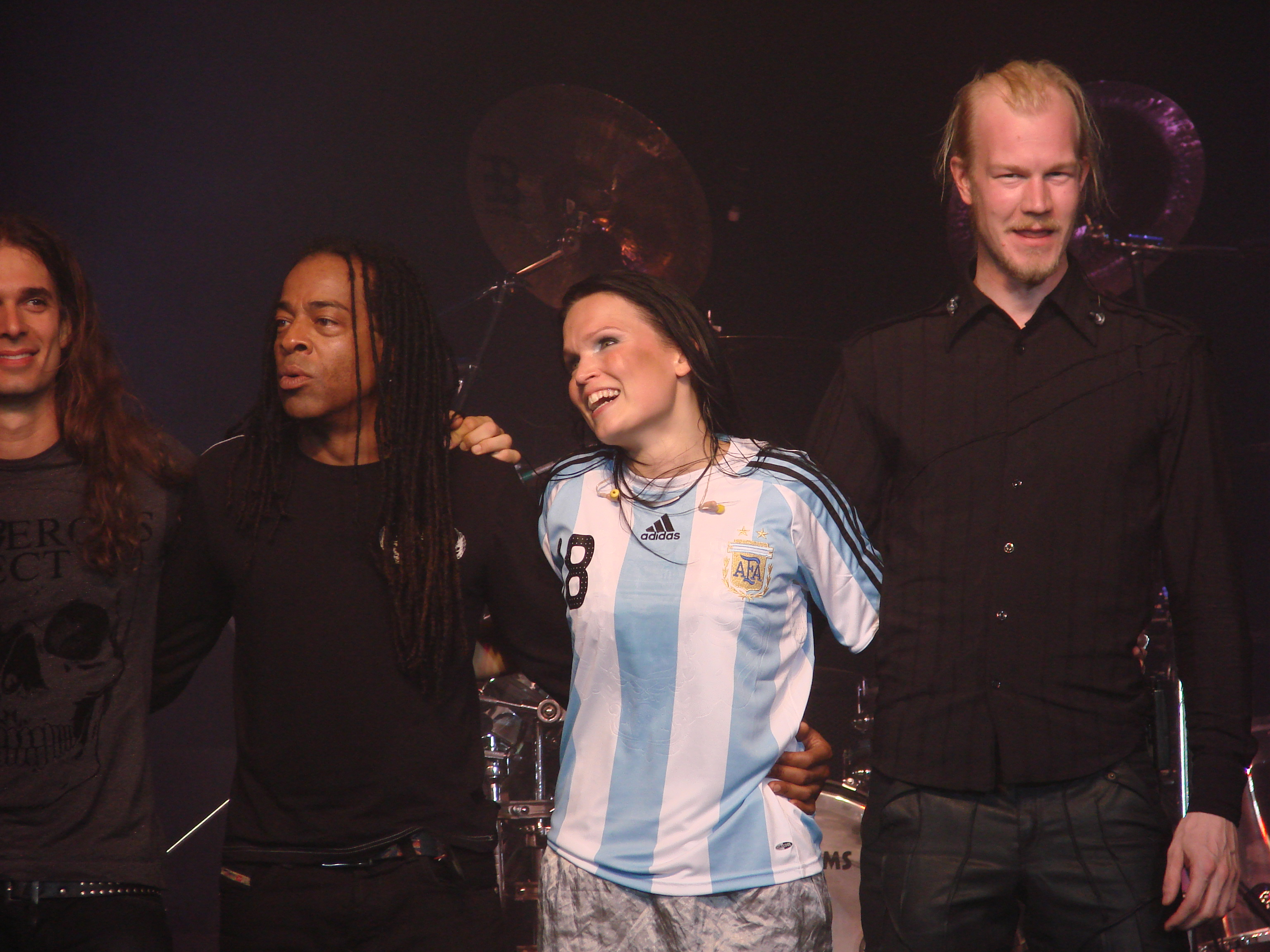
Wimbish is a frequent collaborator with Finnish singer Tarja Turunen, often appearing on tours with her.

Together with McDonald and LeBlanc, Wimbish headed to London in 1984 and started working with producer Adrian Sherwood and formed the group Tackhead. Together with Tackhead and as a session bassist, Wimbish found himself in demand as a bass player for many artists and was considered as a permanent sideman for the Rolling Stones after the departure of bassist Bill Wyman in 1993, but lost the position to Darryl Jones. In the late 1980s Wimbish began crossing paths with vocalist Bernard Fowler, who collaborated with Tackhead and Little Axe. Both sang on records by the Rolling Stones, and Wimbish later played on the Stones' 1997 album Bridges to Babylon. Wimbish joined Living Colour in 1992 (he replaced Muzz Skillings, who left the band) to tour and record the album, Stain.

Living Colour disbanded in 1995, and Wimbish joined his old Sugarhill Gang partners to play in Little Axe, an ambient-dub project initiated by Skip 'Little Axe' MacDonald.

After Living Colour disbanded, Wimbish went back to London to continue his career as a studio bassist. In 1999 he formed the drum and bass group Jungle Funk together with drummer Will Calhoun and percussionist/vocalist Vinx. Also in 1999, Wimbish solo album Trippy Notes for Bass was released. In 2000, Living Colour was re-formed and toured in the United States, South America and Europe. In 2001 and 2002 Wimbish recorded and played with rapper Mos Def in a band called BlackJack Johnson, which also featured members of P-Funk and Bad Brains in the lineup.

Wimbish also formed Head Fake, a drum and bass project with drummer Will Calhoun. They released a CD, In The Area. In 2005 they started recording new songs. The recording took place in Brussels, Belgium and was followed by an extensive European tour. The CD has never been released. A Head>>Fake DVD was released in 2008. It features a recording of a Head>>Fake concert in Prague.

In 2008 Wimbish, signed with Enja Records, and released his second solo album, CinemaSonics.

In 2009, Living Colour released and toured for the album "The Chair in the Doorway".

Wimbish was also featured on six Little Axe albums with Alan Glen on harmonica.

== Gear ==
Wimbish has endorsed Ibanez and Spector bass guitars.

== Discography ==
Solo albums

- Trippy Notes for Bass (1999)
- CinemaSonics (2008)

With Michael Bolton

- The Hunger (Columbia Records, 1987)

With Naomi Campbell

- Babywoman (Epic Records, 1994)

With Chris Catena

- Freak Out! (Frontiers, 2003)

With Depeche Mode

- Ultra (Mute, 1997)

With Will Downing

- Will Downing (Island Records, 1988)
- Come Together as One (Island Records, 1989)
- A Dream Fulfilled (Island Records, 1991)

With Sheena Easton

- No Sound But a Heart (EMI, 1987)

With Bernard Fowler

- Friends With Privileges (Sony, 2006)
- The Bura (MRI, 2016)

With Gary Go

- Gary Go (Decca Records, 2009)

With Al Green

- Don't Look Back (BMG, 1993)
- Your Heart's in Good Hands (MCA Records, 1995)

With Nona Hendryx

- The Heat (RCA Records, 1985)

With Mick Jagger

- Primitive Cool (Columbia Records, 1987)
- Wandering Spirit (Atlantic Records, 1993)

With Billy Idol

- Cyberpunk (Chrysalis Records, 1993)

With Annie Lennox

- Diva (Arista Records, 1992)
- Medusa (Arista Records, 1995)

With Madonna

- Erotica (Warner Bros. Records, 1992)

With Melba Moore

- I'm in Love (Capitol Records, 1988)

With Lou Rawls

- Close Company (Epic Records, 1984)

With Nicole Renée

- Nicole Renée (Atlantic Records, 1998)

With The Rolling Stones

- Bridges to Babylon (Virgin Records, 1997)

With Joe Satriani

- The Extremist (Relativity Records, 1992)
- Time Machine (Relativity Records, 1993)

With Seal

- Seal (ZTT, 1991)

With Carly Simon

- Spoiled Girl (Epic Records, 1985)
- Letters Never Sent (Arista Records, 1994)

With Brenda K. Starr

- I Want Your Love (Mirage, 1985)

With Candi Staton

- Nightlites (Sugar Hill Records, 1982)

With The Sugarhill Gang

- Sugarhill Gang (Sugar Hill, 1980)

With Steven Van Zandt

- Freedom – No Compromise (EMI, 1987)

With Peter Wolf

- Come As You Are (EMI, 1987)

With Ronnie Wood

- Slide on This (Continuum Records, 1992)
