= Keith LeBlanc =

American drummer (1954–2024)

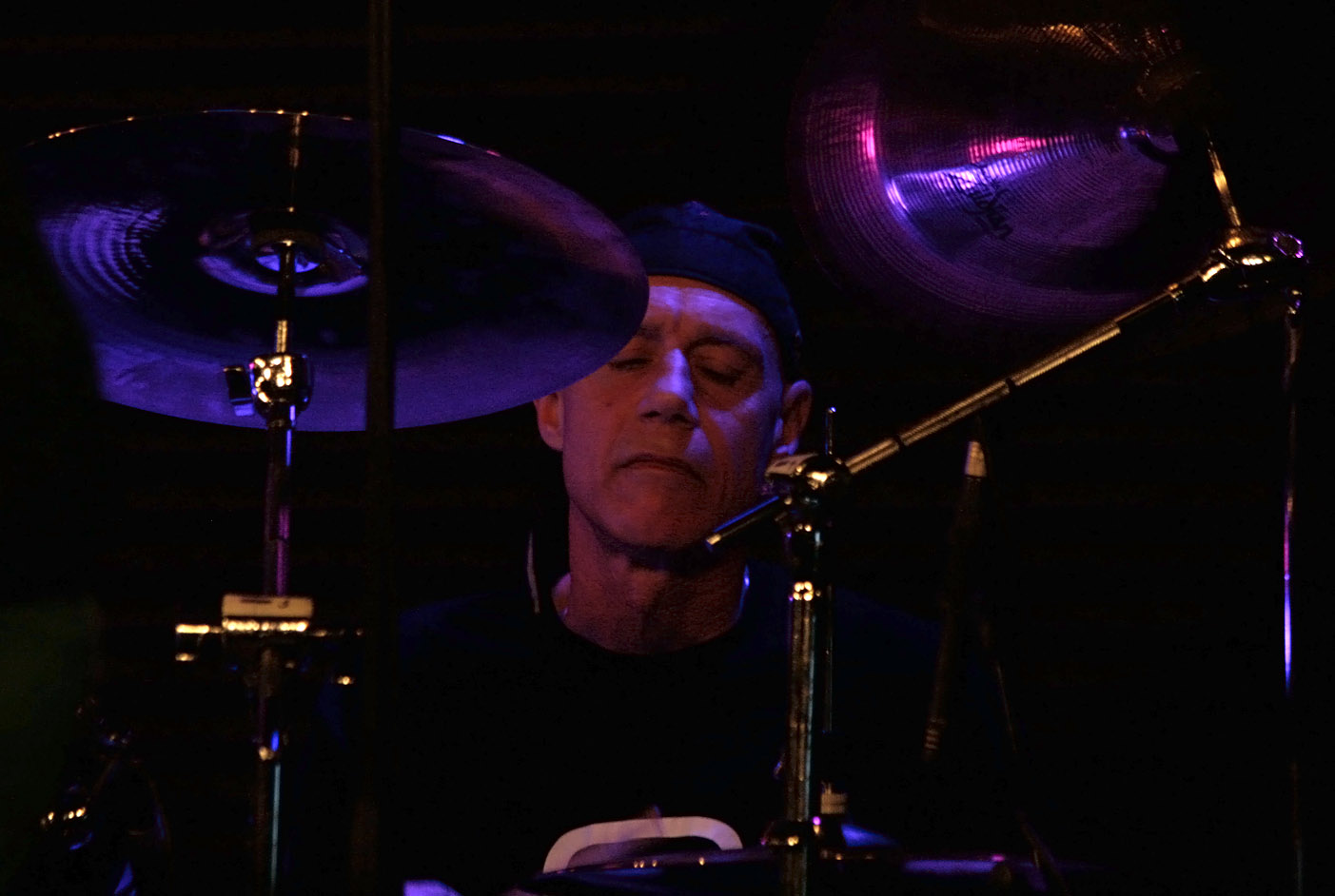
- LeBlanc performing with Little Axe in 2009

Background information
- Born: November 10, 1954; Bristol, Connecticut, U.S.
- Died: April 4, 2024 (aged 69)
- Occupations: Drummer; record producer
- Years active: c. 1980s–2024

Keith LeBlanc (November 10, 1954 – April 4, 2024) was an American drummer and record producer who was a member of the bands Little Axe and Tackhead.

His record "No Sell Out" was one of the first sample-based releases. The song was a moderate success, charting at No. 60 on the UK singles chart, and becoming the single of the week for several major music publications. His career started out on Sugar Hill Records recording with hip hop pioneers Grandmaster Flash and Melle Mel, and released several singles on and was a studio musician for Tommy Boy Records. He is also featured on several tracks on the album Pretty Hate Machine (1989) by Nine Inch Nails. He had his own record label on which he released music, samples records, and experiments.

== Early life ==
LeBlanc was born in Bristol, Connecticut, on November 10, 1954, and grew up there. He got his start playing drums after seeing Ringo Starr from the Beatles on TV. After showing an early interest and focus, his parents bought him a practice pad, and he joined the orchestra in school. A drummer in school encouraged his early interest, inspiring him to cobble together a makeshift kit, which he played along to records on his father's HiFi system. He performed his first show at 14 after being snuck into the club by his older bandmates.

== Sugar Hill Records ==
LeBlanc's friend Harold Sargent, the drummer for the house band at Sugar Hill Records, was retiring and needed to find his replacement. He brought in LeBlanc to audition for Doug Wimbish and Skip McDonald, who agreed to take him on after hitting it off with LeBlanc. After replacing Sargent, LeBlanc worked as the session drummer for Sugar Hill Records for four years.

== Death ==
LeBlanc died on April 4, 2024. His death was confirmed by his label On-U Sound.

== Discography ==
=== Solo albums ===
- Major Malfunction (1986, World)
- Stranger Than Fiction (1989, Enigma)
- Invisible Spike (1991, Blanc)
- Raw (1990, Blanc)
- Time Traveller (1992, Blanc)
- Freakatorium (1999, Blanc)
- Stop the Confusion (Global Interference) (2005, Collision: Cause of Chapter 3)

=== Remixes ===
- Strip Mall Church (Vocal) (Keith LeBlanc Prophet Siren Remix) (2023, Emergency Hearts)=

=== Session work ===
- The Sugarhill Gang - Sugarhill Gang (1980)
- The Sugarhill Gang - "8th Wonder" (1980)
- The Sugarhill Gang - "Apache" (1981)
- Grandmaster Flash and the Furious Five - "It's Nasty" (1981)
- Grandmaster Flash and the Furious Five - The Message (1982)
- Force MDs - Love Letters (1984)
- ABC - How to Be a ... Zillionaire! (1985)
- Artists United Against Apartheid - Sun City (1985)
- Force MDs - Chillin' (1985)
- Afrika Bambaataa and Soulsonic Force - Planet Rock: The Album (1986)
- Ministry - Twitch (1986)
- R.E.M. - "Turn You Inside-Out" (1988)
- Nine Inch Nails - Pretty Hate Machine (1989)
- Seal - Seal (1991)
- Annie Lennox - Diva (1992)
- The Wolfgang Press - Funky Little Demons (1996)
- Tina Turner - Wildest Dreams (1996)
- Depeche Mode - "Useless" (1997)
- Tina Turner - Twenty Four Seven (1999)
- Spoon vs. On-U Sound - Lucifer on the Moon (2022)
- The Chess Project - New Moves (2024)
