= Chrysalis (disambiguation) =

A chrysalis is the pupa stage of a butterfly.

Chrysalis may also refer to:

== Literature ==
- Chrysalis (magazine), a feminist publication
- Chrysalis (sci-fi anthology), published 1977-1983
- "Chrysalis" (short story), by Ray Bradbury, published in S Is for Space
- Chrysalis, a character in DC Comics

== Music ==
- Chrysalis (Angunn album), 2000
- Chrysalis (Tia Gostelow album), 2020
- Chrysalis (EP), a 2016 EP by I.O.I
- Chrysalis, a 2021 EP by The Score
- Chrysalis (band), an American folk/rock band
- Chrysalis Group, a UK music and publishing company
  - Chrysalis Music, a British independent music publisher
- Chrysalis Records, a record label
- "Chrysalis", a song by the Cherry Poppin' Daddies from Rapid City Muscle Car
- "Chrysalis", a bonus track by Snarky Puppy from the album Immigrance
- "Chrysalis", a song by Opeth from Sorceress

== Television and film ==
- Chrysalis (2007 film), a French science fiction film directed by Julien Leclercq
- Chrysalis (2011 film), a Spanish drama film
- "Chrysalis" (Babylon 5), a 1994 episode of the science fiction series
- "Chrysalis" (Star Trek: Deep Space Nine), season seven episode of Star Trek: Deep Space Nine
- Ray Bradbury's Chrysalis, a 2008 adaptation of the short story
- Queen Chrysalis, a character from My Little Pony: Friendship Is Magic
- "Chrysalis", the villain alter ego of Cerise Bianca/Lila Rossi and the second main antagonist of Miraculous: Tales of Ladybug & Cat Noir.

== Other uses ==
- Chrysalis (boarding school), an all-girl small therapeutic boarding school located in Montana
- Chrysallis (gastropod), a genus of terrestrial snails
- Chrysalis (moon), hypothesized former moon of Saturn that broke up to form its rings
- Chrysalis (sculpture), a 1990 public artwork by Beth Sahagian
- Chrysalis School (Woodinville, WA), a US private school
- MIT Chrysalis, a 1970s United States human-powered aircraft
- SS Chrysalis (1873), a Greek steamship in service 1911-17
- Chrysalis, a nationwide nonprofit organization, see director and board member Brett Ratner
- Chrysalis, a youth and young adult Methodist education program similar to the Catholic Cursillo

== See also ==
- Crystalis, a 1990 action role-playing video game
