= Billie Ray Martin discography =

- Studio albums: 5
- EPs: 8
- Compilations: 3
- Video: 2
- Singles: 33

This is the discography of German electro soul singer and songwriter Billie Ray Martin.

Following her time with Electribe 101 during the 1980s and early 1990s, Billie embarked on a solo career in 1993. Following the release of her first solo single "Persuasion", she achieved some chart success throughout the rest of the 1990s, including her biggest hit to date, "Your Loving Arms", which reached the top 10 in the UK, Ireland, and on various US dance charts.

Since 2000, despite having limited commercial success, Martin has continued to produce and release studio albums and singles worldwide.

== Studio albums ==
- Deadline for My Memories (1995) (UK #46) (AUS #146)
- 18 Carat Garbage (2001)
- 18 Carat Garbage Demos (2002)
- Hollywood Under the Knife (2011) (The Opiates)
- The Soul Tapes (2016)

== EPs ==
- 4 Ambient Tales (1993)
- Crime & Punishment (1999) (Billie Ray Martin presents Sonnenstahl)
- Anatomy Of A Plastic Girl EP (2008) (The Opiates)
- The Crackdown Project Volume 1 - Sold Out To Disco (2010) (Billie Ray Martin feat. Stephen Mallinder, Maertini Broes & Lusty Zanzibar)
- The Crackdown Project Volume 2 - Darkness Restored (2010) (Billie Ray Martin feat. Stephen Mallinder, Maertini Broes & Lusty Zanzibar)
- Sold Life EP (2011) (Billie Ray Martin & Hard Ton)
- Rainy Days and Remixes EP (2011) (The Opiates)

== Compilations ==
- New Demos (2003)
- Recycled Garbage (remix compilation, 2002)
- Hollywood Cuts (The Remixes) (2012) (The Opiates)

== Video ==
- The Videos 89-98 (compilation DVD, 2008) [also includes Electribe 101]
- Five Takes (A Song About Andy) (DVD, 2012) [features five versions of "On Borrowed Time"]

== Singles ==
Year	Title	Peak chart positions										Album
Year	Title	AUS	AUT	FIN	IRE	ITA	NED	UK	UK Dance	US Club Play	US Dance Sales	Album
1993	"Persuasion" (Billie Ray Martin & Spooky)	—	—	—	—	—	—	—	—	—	—	Non-album single
1994	"Sky High" (as Individual)^{A} (continental Europe issue)	—	—	—	—	19	—	—	—	—	—	Non-album single
1994	"Your Loving Arms"	—	—	—	—	—	—	38	2	—	—	Deadline for My Memories
1995	"Your Loving Arms" (re-issue)	85	23	—	8	1	36	6	2	1	5	Deadline for My Memories
1995	"Running Around Town"	101	—	19	—	88	—	29	2	3	22	Deadline for My Memories
1995	"Mystic Motion" (Datura written by Billie Ray Martin)^{A} (continental Europe issue)	—	—	—	—	4	—	—	—	—	—	Eternity (Datura album, 1993)
1995	"Imitation of Life"	159	—	—	—	—	—	29	2	15	—	Deadline for My Memories
1996	"Sky High" (as Voices present Individual)^{A} (UK & US issues)	—	—	—	—	—	—	84	9	—	—	Non-album single
1996	"Space Oasis"	—	—	—	—	—	—	66	32	—	—	Deadline for My Memories
1996	"You and I (Keep Holding On)"	—	—	—	—	—	—	76	—	—	—	Deadline for My Memories
1996	"Mystic Motion" (Datura written by Billie Ray Martin)^{A} (UK issue)	—	—	—	—	—	—	—	—	—	—	Eternity (Datura album, 1993)
1997	"Passion" (Datura written with Billie Ray Martin)^{A}	—	—	—	—	14	—	—	—	—	—	Eternity (Datura album, 1993)
1998	"Pacemaker" (Billie Ray Martin presents Sonnenstahl)	—	—	—	—	—	—	—	—	—	—	Crime & Punishment (EP)
1999	"Honey"	—	—	—	—	—	63	54	12	—	—	Non-album single
2001	"Systems of Silence"	—	—	—	—	—	—	—	—	—	—	18 Carat Garbage
2001	"18 Carat Garbage"	—	—	—	—	—	—	—	—	—	—	18 Carat Garbage
2001	"I've Never Been to Memphis"	—	—	—	—		—	—	—	—	—	18 Carat Garbage
2001	"Where Fools Rush In"	—	—	—	—	—	—	—	—	—	—	18 Carat Garbage
2002	"I'm Not Keen" (Mikael Delta with Billie Ray Martin)	—	—	—	—	—	—	—	—	—	—	Vulnerable (Mikael Delta EP)
2003	"Honey" (US issue)	—	—	—	—	—	—	—	—	3	14	Non-album single
2003	"No Brakes On My Rollerskates" (Hot Skates 3000 aka Billie Ray Martin)	—	—	—	—	—	—	—	—	—	—	Non-album single
2003	"Dead Again"	—	—	—	—	—	—	—	—	—	—	Non-album single
2005	"Je Regrette Everything" (Hell feat. Billie Ray Martin)	—	—	—	—	—	—	—	13	—	—	N.Y. Muscle (Hell album, 2003)
2005	"Bright Lights Fading" (Slam featuring Billie Ray Martin)	—	—	—	—	—	—	96^{B}	6^{B}	—	—	Year Zero (Slam album)
2007	"Undisco Me"	—	—	—	—	—	—	—	—	20	—	Non-album single
2011	"Sweet Surburban Disco"	—	—	—	—	—	—	—	—	—	—	Non-album single
2011	"Fantasy Girl" (Billie Ray Martin and Hard Ton)	—	—	—	—	—	—	—	—	—	—	Non-album single
2012	"Hyper Lust" (Motor feat. Billie Ray Martin)	—	—	—	—	—	—	—	—	—	—	Man Made Machine (Motor album)
2014	"After All"	—	—	—	—	—	—	—	—	—	—	Non-album single
2014	"Off the Rails" (Billie Ray Martin and Aérea Negrot)	—	—	—	—	—	—	—	—	—	—	Non-album single
2016	"Strongheaded Woman"	—	—	—	—	—	—	—	—	—	—	The Soul Tapes
2016	"The Glittering Gutter"	—	—	—	—	—	—	—	—	8	—	The Soul Tapes
2022	"Back For More" (Next Door But One feat. Billie Ray Martin)	—	—	—	—	—	—	—	—	—	—	Non-album single
"—" denotes items that did not chart or were not released in that territory. A) In the 90s, singles with songs written by and/or sung by Martin emerged, sometimes under pseudonyms B) Charted via inclusion on Slam's 3B4Zero EP

== Remixes ==
- "Imitation of Life" was remixed by Grammy Award winning remixer David Morales.
- Brian Transeau (aka BT) produced remixes for the singles "Space Oasis" and "Running Around Town".
- Several of Martin's singles have been remixed by Junior Vasquez, including "Your Loving Arms", "Running Around Town", "Space Oasis", "Honey", "18 Carat Garbage" and "Systems of Silence".
- "Your Loving Arms" and "Imitation of Life" were remixed by Brothers in Rhythm.
- Roger Sanchez and Todd Terry both remixed "Your Loving Arms".
- "Honey" was remixed by Above & Beyond, Chicane, and Deep Dish.
- "Pacemaker" was remixed by E-Smoove.

== See also ==
- List of number-one dance hits (United States)
- List of artists who reached number one on the US Dance chart
