= Deadline for My Memories =

Studio album by Billie Ray Martin
- Released: October 1995 (European Union); January 1996 (United Kingdom); June 1996 (United States)
- Genres: Electronica; House; Soul
- Length: 64:31
- Labels: Magnet (Europe, Australia, Canada); Sire/Elektra Records (US)
- Producers: BT, Billie Ray Martin, The Grid

Billie Ray Martin chronology
Four Ambient Tales-EP (1993)	Deadline for My Memories (1995)	18 Carat Garbage (2001)

Deadline for My Memories is the debut solo studio album by Billie Ray Martin, first released in October 1995 by Magnet Records. The album includes Martin's biggest hit single, "Your Loving Arms".

Primarily produced by Brian Transeau, Deadline for My Memories also features production by Martin and The Grid, and combines electronic dance music with soul and gospel influences. Several of its songs originated in material Martin had developed with her former group Electribe 101. The album reached number 46 on the UK Albums Chart, while its singles included the UK top-ten hit "Your Loving Arms" and "Running Around Town", "Imitation of Life", "Space Oasis" and "You and I (Keep Holding on)".

== Background and production ==
The album had the working titles Salad Days and Space Oasis.

The album was mainly produced by Brian Transeau (aka BT), marking his first major production for another artist. Reportedly, the working relationship was turbulent because of their different approaches to production, with Martin wanting collaboration while Transeau preferred to work independently. Eventually, Martin reined back control, mixing all but two of the Transeau-produced tracks. What is heard on the album reflects Martin's style and choices more than BT's.

On the album, Martin collaborated with a wide range of musicians and producers. Six of the tracks had been demoed by Electribe 101 for an unreleased second album in 1991-92. "Persuasion" and "Wishing You Well", first recorded during those sessions, had already been released on Martin's 1993 singles. Other writing collaborators include Arthur Baker, Genetic, Eric Kupper, Patrick Patterson and Andrew Vowles. The U.S. CD bonus track "Stand by Me" is Martin's interpretation of the 1905 gospel hymn by Charles Tindley.

== Music and lyrics ==
Deadline for My Memories combines electronic dance music with elements of soul and gospel. Martin described the album's musical approach as "Kraftwerk meets Phil Spector", while The Independent characterised it as a mixture of electronic dance beats and gospel-influenced ballads. The album combines electronic synthesiser bass with soul harmonies, with Eurodance influences evident in some of its synthesiser melodies. Strings feature prominently on several of the ballads; "I Don't Believe" incorporates gospel influences, while "I Try" draws on 1970s soul. Synthesiser and sampled textures similar to those heard on Martin's earlier collaboration with The Grid, Four Ambient Tales, also recur throughout the album.

Lyrically, the album deals primarily with relationships and emotional experience. Billboard characterised the album as examining the "psychological ebb and flow of life" from Martin's own experience and perspective, identifying "Still Waters", "I Try" and "Big Tears and Make-Up" as examples of its more lyrically introspective material. "Hands Up and Amen", which Martin had originally written before forming Electribe 101, tells the fictional story of an older Black woman being robbed at gunpoint in Queens and having her religious faith challenged; its title refers both to raising one's hands during a robbery and raising them in prayer.

== Release history ==
Deadline for My Memories was initially planned to be released soon after the October 1994 single "Your Loving Arms". The album was first released in continental Europe on Magnet/Eastwest in October 1995. A vinyl edition was released in the UK and a CD edition in Australia around the same time. The CD was released in the UK in January 1996. The U.S. and Canada CD versions were released on Sire in June 1996.

The album reached no. 46 on the UK Albums Chart and no. 146 on the Australian Albums Chart.

== Track listing ==
CD	LP	MC	Title	Writer(s)	Producer(s)	Length
1	A1	A1	"Hands Up and Amen"	Billie Ray Martin	Brian Transeau	5:25
2	A2	A2	"Running Around Town"	Martin	Transeau	4:26
3	A3	A3	"Still Waters"	Martin · Arthur Baker · Andrew Vowles	Transeau	5:07
4	B1	A4	"Deadline for My Memories"	Martin · Leslie Fleming · Robert Cimarosti · Joseph Stevens · Brian Nordhoff	Transeau	4:59
5	B2	A5	"Imitation of Life"	Martin · Eric Kupper	Transeau	4:27
6	B3	A6	"I Try"	Martin · Patrick Patterson	Transeau	3:16
7	C1	B1	"True Moments of My World"	Martin · Fleming · Cimarosti · Stevens · Nordhoff	Martin	5:23
8	C2	B2	"We Shall Be True"	Martin · Genetic	Transeau	4:40
9	C3	B3	"I Don't Believe"	Martin · Franz Stegman	Transeau	5:59
10	D1	B4	"Space Oasis"	Martin · Martin King	Transeau	5:05
11	D2	B5	"You and I (Keep Holding on)"	Martin · Fleming · Cimarosti · Stevens · Nordhoff	Transeau	4:39
12	D3	B6	"Your Loving Arms" (Note: Remix of 'Original Extended Mix' released on the 1994 and 1995 singles.)	Martin · David Harrow	The Grid	6:33
13	D4	B7	"Big Tears and Make-up" (Note: Bonus track on the U.S. CD; doesn't appear on the U.S. cassette edition.)	Martin	Transeau	4:10

Bonus tracks

CD	LP	MC	Title	Writer(s)	Producer(s)	Length
14	—	—	"Stand by Me" (Note: Bonus track on the U.S. CD.)	Charles Tindley	Martin	5:41
14	—	—	"Ich Glaube Nicht" (Note: German version of "I Don't Believe", bonus track on Germany CD (Magnet 0630 12181 2).)	Martin · Stegman	Transeau	6:03

== Single releases ==
"Your Loving Arms" was the first single associated with the album. Upon its initial release in October 1994, a year before the album, it reached the Top 40 on the UK Singles Chart. When it was re-released the following year, it reached the Top 10. On both issues, "Your Loving Arms" peaked at no. 2 in the UK club chart. Magnet appeared to rely heavily on the lasting success of "Your Loving Arms", featuring new remixes of the track on two subsequent singles.

"True Moments Of My World" almost became the second single. Remixes were made by Junior Vasquez (reportedly played in clubs) and John Digweed (download made available in 2001), but "Running Around Town" was chosen as the next single instead. It reached no. 29 in the UK and hit no. 2 on the club charts. The next single, "Imitation of Life" reached the exact same positions on the UK charts. The final two singles, "Space Oasis" and "You and I (Keep Holding on)", fared less well in the charts.

Stateside, promotion got off to a strong start. Remixes were specifically commissioned for the US market, including Todd Terry’s takes on "Your Loving Arms", alongside versions of "Running Around Town" by Darrin 'Spike' Friedman and Tony Moran. "Your Loving Arms" hit no. 1 on the Billboard Dance Club Songs chart . "Running Around Town" reached no. 3 on the dance charts. While "Imitation of Life" rose to a respectable no. 15, no further singles were released in the US.

Title	Date	UK & US peak chart positions			
Title	Date	UK	UK Dance	US Club	US Hot 100
"Your Loving Arms"	October 1994 (UK 1st issue)	38	2	N/A	N/A
"Your Loving Arms"	March 1995 (US), May 1995 (UK 2nd issue)	6	2	1	46^{[a]}
"Running Around Town"	August 1995	29	2	3	—
"Imitation of Life"	December 1995	29	2	15	—
"Space Oasis"	March 1996	66	32	N/A	N/A
"You and I (Keep Holding on)"	July 1996	76	—	N/A	N/A

— denotes released but did not chart; N/A denotes not released in the territory.

[a] Following its initial peak at no. 87 in 1995, "Your Loving Arms" re-entered the Billboard Hot 100 in 1996 following the US release of Todd Terry remixes, eventually reaching no. 46.

== Critical reception ==
Professional ratings
Review scores
Source	Rating
Aftonbladet	bad 2/6
AllMusic	3/5 stars
The Encyclopedia of Popular Music	3/5 stars
The Guardian	5/5 stars
Music Week	3/5 stars
Muzik	3/5 stars
Q	3/5 stars
SKY Magazine	5/5 stars
Spin	8/10

The album received mostly positive reviews. Music Week wrote, "The voice is smooth, the production slick and the demographic almost perfect – Annie Lennox meets Aretha Franklin in Nineties clubland." The i-D magazine wrote, "Dietreich of '90s dancefloors makes her great return, crooning through the hard-edged glamour of epic BT handbag tunes into plains of deep, introspective soul. Sadness has never sounded so sweet." Andrew Smith of The Sunday Times concluded his favourable review simply stating "the record is a joy".

Tom Doyle was more reserved in his review for Q, concluding: "It is with the moodier material (...) that the musical backdrops manage to actually enhance her remarkable vocal prowess and make for engaging material of stylistic strength and individuality."

On the other hand, Taylor Parkes of the Icon magazine described the album "a pretty cheap thing" and claimed "there's something faintly frowzy about it all." In Aftonbladet, Anders Hvidfeldt described the album: "A German who sounds like a bad version of Annie Lennox and tumbles through sticky ballads, technoblob, country (all in English) and finishes with "Ich glaube nicht" in her native tongue. Tangled."

== Personnel ==
Credits adapted from the liner notes of Deadline for My Memories.

=== Musicians ===
- Billie Ray Martin – lead vocals, backing vocals except where noted
- Shawn Lee – guitars on tracks 1, 3 and 4; guitars and drums on track 6
- B. J. Cole – pedal steel guitar on tracks 9 and 11
- Stuart Johnson – pedal steel guitar on "Stand by Me"
- Colette – piano on track 13
- Volker Janssen – additional keyboards and piano on tracks 3 and 6; keyboards on "Stand by Me"
- Dean Ross – additional keyboards on track 7
- Martin King – original programming on track 10
- Gavin Wright – string orchestra leader
- The Phantom Horns – brass orchestra
- Gary Barnickle – brass orchestra leader
- Danny Campbell – backing vocals on track 9
- Luvaine Maximum – backing vocals on track 9
- Ade – backing vocals on "Stand by Me"
- Anita Kelsey – backing vocals on "Stand by Me"
- Caroline Mackendrick – backing vocals on "Stand by Me"

=== Production ===
- Billie Ray Martin – executive production; vocal production, vocal arrangements, additional production and mixing except where noted; production on track 7 and "Stand by Me"; pedal steel production on tracks 9–11; string and brass arrangements
- Brian Transeau – production except where noted; mixing on tracks 5 and 10
- The Grid – production and mixing on track 12
- Roebuck Staples – arrangements on "Stand by Me"
- Gary Barnickle – string and brass arrangements
- Andrew Fryer – additional production and programming on track 8
- Pete Schwier – recording engineer except where noted
- Adrian Scarff – recording engineer on tracks 5 and 10; assistant engineer except where noted
- Ren Swan – recording engineer on track 7; mix engineer except where noted
- Nick Sykes – recording engineer on track 12
- Paul Gomersall – mix engineer on tracks 5 and 10
- Greg Jackman – mix engineer on tracks 4 and 11 and "Stand by Me"

=== Artwork ===
- Billie Ray Martin – photography/styling/make-up concept
- Mike Owen – photography
- Form – design
