= Kate Cameron =

Kate Cameron may refer to:

- Kate Cameron (curler) (born 1991), Canadian curler
- Kate Cameron (singer), British singer
