= 99 North =

99 North may refer to:

- 99 North (record label), sub-label of Higher State
- Visitors’ Guide to Whistler Blackcomb
- Interstate 99
- A US Highway
