= Electribal Memories =

Studio album by Electribe 101
- Released: 1990; 1998 (reissue)
- Recorded: 1988–1990
- Genres: House; dance
- Length: 79:20
- Labels: Mercury/PolyGram; 842 965 (first pressing); 538 050 (second pressing)
- Producer: Electribe 101

Electribal Memories is the debut album by English electronic music group Electribe 101. It was released in 1990 and reached number 26 in the UK Albums Chart. The album includes the singles "Tell Me When the Fever Ended" (No. 32 in the UK Singles Chart), "Talking with Myself" (UK No. 23), "You're Walking" (UK No. 50) and a cover of the Jesse Rae / Odyssey song "Inside Out" (UK No. 77). The St. Petersburg Times concluded that Electribal Memories "is the most consistent dance album of the past year, a focused collection that concentrates on the fundamentals of house music and skillfully avoids the pitfalls that have marred numerous full-length projects by other dance-oriented artists."

The album was re-released in 1998 with three remixes of "Talking with Myself," which had gained popularity that year and was again released as a single, reaching number 39 in the UK Singles Chart. In 2002, the album was reissued again under the title The Best of Electribe 101 Featuring Billie Ray Martin. The album has never been released in the United States, and the first pressing was only available as an import, despite the release of the album's singles there.

A second album, Electribal Soul, was shelved until 2022.

== Track listing ==
1. "Talking with Myself"
2. "Lipstick on My Lover"
3. "You're Walking" (Peeping Tom Mix)
4. "Inside Out"
5. "Diamond Dove"
6. "Heading for the Night"
7. "Tell Me When the Fever Ended"
8. "Talking 2"
9. "Electribal Memories"
10. "You're Walking" (Corporate Def Mix [by David Morales])
11. "Talking with Myself" (Frankie Knuckles Mix)
12. "Tell Me When the Fever Ended" (Larry Heard Mix) [edit]

On the 1998 re-release, the following tracks replaced the last three:

10. "Talking with Myself" (Frankie Knuckles Mix)
11. "Talking with Myself '98" (Canny 12" Vocal)
12. "Talking with Myself '98" (Beloved Radio Edit)
