= Your Loving Arms =

1994 single by Billie Ray Martin

Single by Billie Ray Martin

from the album Deadline for My Memories
- Released: 31 October 1994
- Genre: Dance-pop; handbag house; hi-NRG
- Length: 7:02 (extended mix); 4:15 (radio edit)
- Label: Magnet; Sire
- Songwriters: Billie Ray Martin; David Harrow
- Producers: The Grid; Billie Ray Martin

Billie Ray Martin singles chronology
"Persuasion" (1993)	"Your Loving Arms" (1994)	"Running Around Town" (1995)

Music video
- "Your Loving Arms" on YouTube

"Your Loving Arms" is a song by German singer-songwriter Billie Ray Martin, the former lead singer of Electribe 101. It was first released as a single in October 1994 and was included on her debut solo album Deadline for My Memories in 1995. Written by Martin and David Harrow, it received critical acclaim.

The track achieved chart success in 1995 when it peaked at No. 1 in Italy and on the US Billboard Dance Club Play chart, as well as No. 6 on the UK Singles Chart. The success of "Your Loving Arms" contributed to Martin receiving the prize for Best New Dance Solo Artist of 1995 at the International Dance Music Awards in Miami.

== Background and release ==
Martin said that "Your Loving Arms" was written from personal experience. She explained:

It is about someone, who even though their lover is there for them, there is still that loneliness and insecurity. The song is basically about insecurities, someone, who no matter how much love you give that person, it would never be enough! It was a painful [lesson]! But I think it helps you improve and maybe lets you think before you make the same mistakes again.

— S.I.N. magazine, February 1995

Martin wrote "Your Loving Arms" with British record producer and DJ David Harrow. It was produced by the British electronic dance group the Grid, with whom Billie had worked on the 4 Ambient Tales EP the previous year. The single was released on 31 October 1994. Martin previewed the single with a gig at London's Jazz Cafe on 6 October. The single was released twice in the UK and Europe. On the first release in 1994 the track barely reached the top 40 in the UK, but when re-released six months later, the song became a hit.

Martin appeared on Top of the Pops as well as various UK and European TV shows in support of the song. Remixes played a key role in the success of "Your Loving Arms", but also in the marketing of the album. Remixes were released not only on the various formats of "Your Loving Arms", but also on other Martin singles. The first UK single issue of "Your Loving Arms" came with remixes by Diss-Cuss and Junior Vasquez. The US issue retained the Vasquez mixes and added mixes by Roger Sanchez. The second UK issue followed suit. The next single, "Running Around Town", included the Brothers in Rhythm mix of "Your Loving Arms". Finally, the last single from the Deadline album, "You and I (Keep Holding on)", made use of the Todd Terry mixes. The various releases and remixes kept the song in circulation for almost two years.

== Critical reception ==
"Your Loving Arms" received favourable reviews from music critics. AllMusic editor John Bush described it as a "magical" electro-pop track. On the 1994 release, Larry Flick from Billboard magazine declared it "a spirited foray into trance-carpeted hi-NRG territory. Her distinctively creamy voice has seldom sounded so strong and worldly, giving the song's romantic prose a decidedly dark and anxious edge." Ross Jones from The Guardian complimented the singer as the "owner of this era's most haunting voice". He wrote, "At first, this high-octane disco spinner doesn't seem like the best place for her Marlene-meets-Aretha tones, but listen closely and try imagining anyone else caressing it so lovingly, with such unassailable cool." Dele Fadele from NME felt the former Electribe 101 diva reappears "world-weary and tinged with regret, yet somehow inexplicably optimistic." He added that Martin "still has that soulful voice that envelops any speaker system in warmth and is still given to displays of honest emotion in an age of irony. The stuttering sequencers and sub bass somehow manage to add other layers of catchiness to this — almost — Hi-NRG track and you just want to hear more of that old moody stuff." Barry Walters from Spin stated that it "was the pop song with underground credibility, one that everyone could agree had something special. Martin's lyrics speak of profound joy and pain, the melody soars through consciousness like a caress, and the vocal sets itself apart from the wailing of generic gut-busting divas."

== Chart performance ==
"The success of that single validated my belief that a lot of people would respond to my music if they had a chance to hear it. It makes me confident about the future of the album."

— Billie Ray Martin talking to Larry Flick about the song.

"Your Loving Arms" remains Martin's most successful song. It peaked at No. 1 in Italy and was a top-10 hit in Ireland and the United Kingdom. On its first release in 1994, the single peaked at No. 38 on the UK Singles Chart, but rose to No. 2 on the UK Dance Chart. On the second release in May 1995, it peaked at No. 6 on the singles chart and again reached No. 2 on the UK Dance Chart. On the Music & Media Eurochart Hot 100, "Your Loving Arms" peaked at No. 21. It was certified silver in the UK for sales of 200,000 singles.

The success of "Your Loving Arms" relied heavily on remixes. Remixes of the track were spread out on various singles over almost two years. The main remix by Junior Vasquez, 'Soundfactory Vocal', helped make "Your Loving Arms" a major club hit in the US. Following the release of the Todd Terry mixes in 1996 "Your Loving Arms" rose to its highest position on the Billboard Hot 100.

Outside Europe, "Your Loving Arms" reached No. 1 on the US Billboard Dance Club Play chart, No. 5 in Israel, No. 9 on the Canadian RPM Dance chart, and No. 85 in Australia in November 1995. The single reached No. 46 on the US Billboard Hot 100 in 1996 and No. 30 on the US Cash Box Top 100.

== Music videos ==
Two main music videos were made to promote the single. The original, the UK version, is in black-and-white and pays homage to The Cabinet of Dr. Caligari, the 1920 German silent horror film directed by Robert Wiene. Martin is portrayed as a desperate, lovelorn, almost delirious character. The object of her longing is a heavily made-up male figure, whose face remains blank and emotionless throughout the video. Martin rolls on a bed of roses (as pictured on the single sleeve), lies looking exhausted in an armchair and wanders aimlessly in a garden. The only physical contact with the man is when the couple dance together, with no expressions on their faces. Martin is shown reaching out for the man on a staircase, without success. The video ends with a somewhat humorous scene, showing Martin's character collapsing on the garden lawn. A nurse in white helps the woman back on her feet and the two slouch slowly onwards. The second version, made for the US, is in colour. There is also a third version that uses the 7:27-minute 'Soundfactory Vocal' mix by Junior Vasquez, with re-edited scenes from the black-and-white video

== Impact and legacy ==
NME ranked "Your Loving Arms" No. 17 in their list of the Top 20 of 1995 in December 1995, stating that "with Top Ten-tastic soul tunes like this stuffed in her handbag, one thing's for sure: she'll never be alone on the dancefloor." Electronic and clubbing magazine Mixmag ranked it No. 47 in its list of the "100 Greatest Dance Singles of All Time" in 1996. In 1996, the song received one of ASCAP's Rhythm & Soul Awards, and Martin was awarded the prize for Best New Dance Solo Artist of 1995 at the International Dance Music Awards in Miami. Idolator ranked it one of "The 50 Best Pop Singles of 1995" in 2015. John Hamilton described it as "fiery" and "a predestined club classic, a pulsating techno torch song in which Martin sasses, vamps, and pleads over ominous rising chords and a frantic tambourine-inflected beat." Time Out ranked it No. 29 in their list of "The 50 Best Gay Songs to Celebrate Pride All Year Long" in 2022, writing,

Most gay dance anthems are packed with drama of both the lyrical and vocal variety. But in 1994, German singer Billie Ray Martin invaded clubland with this icy floor filler that’s so calm she almost seems detached. Don’t let that near-monotone fool you, though— Martin is a formidable vocalist, and when she finally cuts loose ‘Burning inside, burning inside, yeah!’), it’s a master class in the art of delayed gratification.

— Time Out magazine, January 2022

In 2007, Chris Lowe of the Pet Shop Boys selected "Your Loving Arms" for HMV's My Inspiration advertising campaign, in which musicians chose songs that had inspired them. Martin also participated in the campaign, selecting the Pet Shop Boys song "Paninaro" as her inspiration.

"Your Loving Arms" has subsequently been covered and reworked by a number of dance artists. In 1998, British group Ambrosia sampled "Your Loving Arms" on their single "Inside Your Arms", which combined elements of hip hop and drum and bass. A trance cover by Karen Overton, first released in 2005, received international release and numerous remixes, reaching number 20 on the Finnish Singles Chart in 2006, with further remixes continuing to appear in subsequent decades.

In 2020, Australian electronic musician The Kite String Tangle released "North", using newly recorded vocals by Martin from "Your Loving Arms" that were considerably slowed down; Fred Again used a similar treatment of the song's vocals on "Billie (Loving Arms)" the following year. The latter became a popular feature of Fred Again's live shows, with audiences frequently singing along to the refrain.

== Charts ==
=== Weekly charts ===
Chart (1994–1996)	Peak position
Australia (ARIA)	85
Austria (Ö3 Austria Top 40)	23
Canada Retail Singles (The Record)	9
Europe (Eurochart Hot 100)	21
Europe (European Dance Radio)	9
Ireland (IRMA)	8
Israel (Israeli Singles Chart)	5
Italy (Musica e dischi)	1
Italy Airplay (Music & Media)	6
Netherlands (Dutch Top 40)	36
Netherlands (Single Top 100)	36
Scottish Singles Sales (Official Charts)	6
UK Singles (Official Charts)	6
UK Dance (Official Charts)	2
UK Airplay (Music Week)	18
UK Club Chart (Music Week)	9
UK Pop Tip Club Chart (Music Week)	8
US Billboard Hot 100	46
US Dance Club Songs (Billboard)	1
US Maxi-Singles Sales (Billboard)	5
US Cash Box Top 100	30

=== Year-end charts ===
Chart (1994)	Position
UK Club Chart (Music Week)	73

Chart (1995)	Position
UK Singles (OCC)	74
US Dance Club Play (Billboard)	13
US Maxi-Singles Sales (Billboard)	23

Chart (1996)	Position
US Top 40/Mainstream (Billboard)	90

== Certifications ==
Region	Certification	Certified units/sales
United Kingdom (BPI)	Silver	200,000^{‡}
^{‡} Sales+streaming figures based on certification alone.

== Release history ==
Region	Date	Format(s)	Label(s)	Ref.
United Kingdom	31 October 1994	12-inch vinyl; CD; cassette	Magnet	
United Kingdom (rerelease)	8 May 1995	12-inch vinyl; CD; cassette	Magnet	
Australia	21 August 1995	CD	Magnet	
United States	15 April 1996	Rhythmic contemporary; contemporary hit radio	Sire	

== See also ==
- List of number-one dance singles of 1995 (U.S.)
