= C Batter C =

Video by The Orb
- Released: 11 November 2011
- Length: 91:08
- Label: Malicious Damage - MD704
- Director: Mike Coles

The Orb chronology
The Orb's Adventures Beyond the Ultraworld: Patterns and Textures (1992)	C Batter C (2011)

C Batter C is a video release by ambient techno group The Orb, released in November 2011, featuring a short film titled Battersea Bunches (originally screened in 2010), its soundtrack, and remixes.

== Track listing ==
Disc one (CD)
No.	Title	Length
1.	"Battersea Bunches Original Soundtrack"	17:28
2.	"To Battersea With Bunches [HFB remix]"	6:03
3.	"Meandering Through The Emerald Turf [Gaudi remix]"	5:09
4.	"Brixton Hundreds David Harrow remix]"	4:39
5.	"Latchmere Allotments [Nocturnal Sunshine remix]"	4:02
6.	"Red House, Brown Dog [Being remix]"	4:59
7.	"Beyond the Legend of the Battersea Asparagus Triangle [Autolump remix]"	8:15
8.	"Batter C Bunny’s Munching Orbular Marrow Mix [Thomas Fehlmann remix]"	9:03
Total length:		59:38

Disc two (DVD)
No.	Title	Length
1.	"Battersea Bunches original film"	17:40
2.	"Esmerelda’s Turf"	5:09
3.	"Nocturnal Bunch"	4:02
4.	"Brixton to Harrow"	4:39
Total length:		31:30
