= Billie Ray Martin =

German singer-songwriter

- Martin in 2016

Background information
- Also known as: Lisaweta Prokofjewna; Hot Skates 3000
- Born: Hamburg, West Germany
- Genres: Soul, ambient, electro, house, vocal trance
- Occupation: Singer-songwriter
- Instrument: Vocals
- Years active: 1988–present
- Labels: Mercury, Sire/Elektra, Disco Activisto, Sonnenstahl
- Formerly of: Electribe 101, The Opiates
- Website: billieraymartin.com

Billie Ray Martin is a singer-songwriter whose music combines soul and electronic music. She first became widely known as the lead singer of the electronic group Electribe 101. After the group disbanded, Martin began a solo career. Her international breakthrough came with "Your Loving Arms". It reached number six on the UK Singles Chart in 1995 and topped the US Billboard Dance Club chart. Her debut solo album, Deadline for My Memories, followed in 1995.

Martin subsequently pursued an independent career, releasing 18 Carat Garbage (2001) through her own Sonnenstahl Records, forming The Opiates with Robert Solheim, and later releasing the soul album The Soul Tapes (2016). Throughout her career, Martin has worked with a changing range of musicians and electronic producers.

== Early life ==
Martin was born and raised in Hamburg, West Germany, where she lived with her working-class grandparents near the Reeperbahn in St. Pauli. Martin has described the unconventional environment in which she grew up as formative to her outlook and later work. She was exposed to a wide range of popular music from an early age, including Elvis Presley and German schlager, and her early influences included the Beatles, the Rolling Stones and Elton John. She later became interested in punk and electronic music; Martin has described punk's attitude as influential on her self-expression, while seeing The Human League perform in Hamburg had a formative influence on her musical direction.

== Career ==
=== Career beginnings and Electribe 101 (1980s–1992) ===
Billie Ray Martin moved to Berlin in the early 1980s, initially intending to study at university, but soon became involved in music. Influenced by electronic acts including The Human League, Cabaret Voltaire and Throbbing Gristle, she also discovered Motown while living in Berlin and began exploring the combination of soul vocals with electronic music. Martin performed jazz and gospel songs in Berlin clubs under the name Lisaweta Prokofjewna. She later fronted Billie and the Deep, an eleven-piece soul band, and also worked with Franz Stegman as the duo The Idiot Cards.

Martin moved to London in 1987. She formed Electribe 101 with musicians and producers from Birmingham. The group independently released its first single, "Talking with Myself", before signing with manager Tom Watkins and Phonogram Records.

During this period, Martin also worked with S'Express, contributing vocals to three tracks on their debut album Original Soundtrack. One of them, "Hey Music Lover", reached number six on the UK Singles Chart and gave Martin her first appearance on Top of the Pops.

Electribe 101 released the album Electribal Memories in 1990, which reached number 26 on the UK Albums Chart, while the group had two UK Top 40 singles. They supported Depeche Mode on the European leg of their World Violation Tour and appeared alongside Erasure, Adamski and Was (Not Was) at the Milton Keynes Bowl in September 1990. While recording a second album, the group was dropped by Phonogram. Electribe 101 continued recording for a period before disbanding in 1992, leaving the album unreleased.

=== Solo breakthrough and Deadline for My Memories (1993–1997) ===
Martin's first solo release was a cover of Throbbing Gristle's "Persuasion", recorded with British electronic duo Spooky in 1993. This was followed by Four Ambient Tales, an EP made with Dave Ball and Richard Norris of The Grid. During the same period, she provided uncredited vocals for several Italian dance releases, including three recordings by Datura and the single "Sky High", released under the name Individual.

Without record-company backing, Martin organised her own showcases in London in 1994, performing new material that attracted the interest of Magnet Records. Her first single for the label, "Your Loving Arms", was produced by The Grid and initially released in late 1994. Re-released in May 1995, it reached number six on the UK Singles Chart and number two on the UK Dance Singles Chart. In the United States, where the single was picked up by Sire/Elektra, it topped the Billboard Dance Club chart in March 1995 and later reached number 46 on the Billboard Hot 100.

"Running Around Town" and "Imitation of Life" followed, both reaching number 29 on the UK Singles Chart and number two on the UK Dance Singles Chart. Martin's debut solo album, Deadline for My Memories, was released in continental Europe in late 1995 and in the UK and United States in 1996. Primarily produced by BT, the album incorporated several songs that had originated during sessions for Electribe 101's unreleased second album. Martin promoted the album with television appearances including Later... with Jools Holland. Two further singles, "Space Oasis" and "You and I (Keep Holding On)", were released from the album.

=== Independent career and 18 Carat Garbage (1997–2002) ===
Following Deadline for My Memories, Martin began planning a second solo album combining live soul recordings made in the United States with electronic production in Europe. After her relationship with Magnet/East West ended, Martin moved to New York, where she pursued several projects.

Martin recorded drum-and-bass-influenced material in New York with Fred Jorio, Vinny Vero and others. Finetune Recordings released the single "Pacemaker" in 1998, credited to Billie Ray Martin presents Sonnenstahl, followed by the Crime & Punishment EP in 1999. At the time, Martin stated that the recordings had been issued without her approval. Several of the songs were later re-recorded for 18 Carat Garbage. During the New York period, Martin also recorded a separate collection of traditional soul recordings with Jon and Sally Tiven.

Martin signed an album deal with React Records in 1998, with the Jorio co-writes "Don't Believe a Word" and "Honey" planned as the first singles. "Honey" was subsequently produced by Dave Ball and Ingo Vauk and released in 1999, reaching number 54 on the UK Singles Chart. No album was ultimately released by React.

Later that year, Martin travelled to Memphis to record basic tracks for the album with a band led by Marvell Thomas and featuring musicians associated with Aretha Franklin. Ann Peebles and Carla Thomas contributed vocals. After returning to Hamburg, the recordings were developed further with electronic production, initially with Lunatek and later with Felix Huber.

Martin released 18 Carat Garbage through her own Sonnenstahl Records in 2001. The album received a limited release in Germany, with "I've Never Been to Memphis" and "Where Fools Rush In" released as commercial singles. It was followed by 18 Carat Garbage Demos and the remix collection Recycled Garbage in 2002.

"Honey" was released in the United States, reaching number three on the Billboard Hot Dance Music/Club Play chart in 2003.

=== Electronic projects and The Opiates (2002–2017) ===
Following 18 Carat Garbage, Martin pursued a wide range of solo and collaborative projects.

In 2002, Martin began working with Mikael Delta, releasing the single "I'm Not Keen". Martin also performed a live score to Roman Polanski's film Repulsion in London in 2002, using new arrangements of her own songs alongside cover versions; she repeated the project the following year.

Martin launched her Disco Activisto label in 2003 with "No Brakes on My Roller Skates", a one-off electroclash project produced by Rainer Schirner and released under the name Hot Skates 3000. New Demos followed, a 13-track collection of previously unreleased material developed through several writing and production collaborations, including four songs with Delta. Several of the songs were subsequently developed into new recordings, including "Dead Again" as a solo single, "Je Regrette Everything" with DJ Hell and "Silent Comes the Night Time" with The Opiates. Four of the songs written with the Tivens in New York in the 1990s were later reworked for The Soul Tapes (2016).

In 2004, Martin collaborated with Scottish electronic duo Slam on "Bright Lights Fading", released on their album Year Zero.

In the mid-2000s, Martin began a second career as a disc jockey, launching her own electronic music club night, Komputerliebe, in London and later playing DJ sets internationally.

Martin formed The Opiates with Norwegian electronic musician Robert Solheim in 2008. The duo released the Anatomy of a Plastic Girl EP that year. The duo later released the album Hollywood Under the Knife in 2011, with artwork by Wolfgang Tillmans. A remix album, Hollywood Cuts, followed in 2012.

Martin collaborated with Cabaret Voltaire member Stephen Mallinder on The Crackdown Project in 2010, recording new versions of Cabaret Voltaire's "The Crackdown" and "Just Fascination". Martin appeared alongside Hard Ton on the Sold Life EP in 2011, and with Aérea Negrot on the single "Off the Rails" in 2014.

During this period, Martin's solo releases included "Undisco Me", which reached number 20 on the US Billboard Hot Dance Club Play chart in 2008, the 2012 DVD-only Five Takes (A Song About Andy), inspired by Andy Warhol's work and a cover of David Bowie's "After All" (2014). Martin also provided vocals for several tracks by other artists, including "Silver Machine" by DJ Hell, "Make Me Feel" by Terranova and "Heavy Game" by Hifi Sean.

In the mid-2010s, Martin started making available many releases from her back catalogue as files on Bandcamp.

Martin revived the long-standing soul project she had begun with Jon and Sally Tiven in the late 1990s in 2014, extensively reworking the original recordings. The resulting album, The Soul Tapes, was financed through crowdfunding and released on Sonnenstahl Records in 2016. Later that year, remixes of "The Glittering Gutter" reached number eight on the US Billboard Dance Club chart.

=== Later work (late 2010s–present) ===
In 2019, Martin released a cassette containing four demos and two completed songs from a new project titled Gezeitenraum.

Martin also returned to the Electribe 101 catalogue. "Heading for the Night", a track from the group's debut album Electribal Memories that had originally been considered for single release, was issued in 2021 with previously unreleased Frankie Knuckles mixes. Electribal Soul, comprising recordings made for the group's unfinished second album in 1991–92, followed in 2022 on Martin's Electribal Records. Electribal Memories was reissued by Demon Music Group in 2024 on vinyl and in an expanded four-CD edition.

In 2023, former Supremes member Mary Wilson's posthumous single "Soul Defender", written by Martin, was released.

In recent years, Martin has been developing several new albums, including one inspired by her childhood in Hamburg, a project influenced by 1970s French film soundtracks, and an album setting poetry to music.

== Discography ==
- Deadline for My Memories (1995)
- 18 Carat Garbage (2001)
- Hollywood Under the Knife (2011, as The Opiates)
- The Soul Tapes (2016)
