= Going Back to My Roots =

1977 song by Lamont Dozier

"Going Back to My Roots (Part 1)"

Single by Lamont Dozier
- B-side: "Going Back to My Roots (Part 2)"
- Released: 1977
- Genre: Disco
- Label: Warner Bros
- Songwriter: Lamont Dozier
- Producers: Stewart Levine, Hugh Masekela, Rik Pekkonen

"Going Back to My Roots" is a 1977 song and single by Lamont Dozier.

Originally an album track discussing genealogy, the song was written for the African-American market and touches on the matters of self-identity, family, and soul fulfillment. It has appeared on assorted compilation albums.

A cover version of "Going Back to My Roots" by the American band Odyssey was the most successful in music charts, particularly in European countries, besides reaching number one in South Africa. Cover versions by FPI Project and Linda Clifford have also entered the UK Singles Chart, with FPI Project's version charting in other European markets as well.

== Background ==
The song was written and first recorded by Lamont Dozier for his 1977 LP Peddlin' Music on the Side. It was produced by Stewart Levine and features additional production from Hugh Masekela and Rik Pekkonen.

It has widely been seen as covering the same subject matter as the bestselling Alex Haley novel Roots that depicts a modern-day African-American tracing his ancestry back, via the slave trade, to a village in The Gambia. This is supported by the extended final section, which moves into Afrobeat and Yoruba chanting. Yet in an interview with Blues & Soul magazine in 1977, Dozier stated otherwise: “The song was inspired by the fact that I have my ‘roots’ in Detroit and when I moved to Los Angeles, a few years ago, I found myself taking trips to Detroit to see my family and so on.”

== Richie Havens version ==
An early cover version was recorded by Richie Havens in 1980. Unusually for folk musician Havens, it incorporated disco influences; this version was later sampled in FPI Project's version of the song and in "Destiny and Tenacity" on the Kleptones' 2010 album Uptime / Downtime.

== Odyssey version ==
"Going Back to My Roots"

Single by Odyssey

from the album I Got the Melody
- B-side: "Baba Awa (Roots Suite)"
- Released: May 1981
- Genre: Disco
- Length: 3:25 (7"); 5:25 (12")
- Label: RCA
- Songwriter: Lamont Dozier
- Producer: Steve Tyrell

Odyssey singles chronology
"If You're Lookin' for a Way Out" (1980)	"Going Back to My Roots" (1981)	"It Will Be Alright" (1981)

Performance video
- "Going Back to My Roots" on TopPop on YouTube

New York City disco group Odyssey released a cover version of this song in 1981. It charted at No. 4 on the UK Singles Chart, spending six weeks in the top ten, followed by another remaining six weeks on the chart. It also graced the US Billboard R&B Singles chart at No. 68. In South Africa, "Going Back to My Roots" reached No. 1.

This version of the song appears on the Ashes to Ashes: Series 2 Original Soundtrack and was also danced to by Patsy Palmer and Anton du Beke on the third series of Strictly Come Dancing.

=== Charts ===
Chart (1981)	Peak position
Austria (Ö3 Austria Top 40)	14
Belgium (Ultratop 50 Flanders)	4
Finland (Suomen virallinen lista)	14
France (IFOP)	3
Germany (GfK)	13
Ireland (IRMA)	13
Netherlands (Dutch Top 40)	4
Netherlands (Single Top 100)	4
Norway (VG-lista)	10
South Africa (Springbok Radio)	1
Sweden (Sverigetopplistan)	3
Switzerland (Schweizer Hitparade)	2
UK Singles (Official Charts)	4
US Hot Dance Club Songs (Billboard)	55
US Hot R&B/Hip-Hop Songs (Billboard)	68

== FPI Project version ==
"Going Back to My Roots"

Single by FPI Project

from the album Rich in Paradise
- B-side: "Rich in Paradise"
- Released: November 1989
- Recorded: Garden Studio, Milan, Italy
- Genre: Italo house
- Songwriter: Lamont Dozier
- Producers: Marco Fratty; Corrado Presti; Roberto Intrallazzi; Luciano Berry

FPI Project singles chronology
"Going Back to My Roots" (1989)	"Everybody (All Over the World)" (1990)

In 1989, a version was released by FPI Project, a trio consisting of Marco Fratty, Corrado Presti and Roberto Intrallazzi who, according to John Bush of AllMusic introduced Italo house to the world in the early 1990s. "Going Back to My Roots" features the vocals of English actress/singer Sharon D. Clarke and uses "Rich in Paradise" (featuring vocals by Paolo Dini) as its backing track. "Rich in Paradise" samples Richie Havens' version of "Going Back to My Roots", as well as T99's "Too Nice to Be Real", Honesty 69's "Rich in Paradise", and the Yeah! Woo! loop.

"Going Back to My Roots" / "Rich in Paradise" has charted on two separate occasions in the UK, the first in 1989 at No. 9, and a 1999 release of new mixes on the 99 North label at No. 96. The 1989 version also charted at No. 5 in Germany, No. 5 in Austria and No. 10 in Switzerland. Another version, by Nick Hussey featuring Barry Stewart on vocals, made No.12 on the UK Dance Chart in 1994.

The song appears on the compilation album Deep Heat 5 – Feed the Fever.

=== Track listings ===
==== Original release ====
7": EMI / 06 2037567 (Italy)

1. "Going Back to My Roots" – 4:10
2. "Salsa in Paradise" – 4:00

7": On the Beat / OTB 1385-0 (France)

1. "Going Back to My Roots" – 4:10
2. "Rich in Paradise" – 3:35

7": On the Beat / OTB 1385-7 (France)

1. "Going Back to My Roots" – 4:02
2. "Rich in Paradise" – 3:35

7": ZYX / ZYX 6256-7 (Germany)

1. "Going Back to My Roots" – 3:40
2. "Rich in Paradise" – 3:38

7": Rumour / RUMA 9 (UK)

1. "Going Back to My Roots"
2. "Rich in Paradise"

7": Rumour / RUMAS 9 (UK)

1. "Going Back to My Roots" (vocal remix)
2. "Rich in Paradise"

12": Paradise Project / MIX 001 (Italy)

1. "Going Back to My Roots" – 5:48
2. "Rich in Paradise" – 5:28
3. "Piano in Paradise" – 1:42

12": Paradise Project / MIX 002 (Italy)

1. "Going Back to My Roots" (vocal version) – 5:50
2. "Rich in Paradise" (original version) – 5:28
3. "Piano in Paradise" (original version) – 1:42
4. "Going Back to My Roots" (remix version) – 5:05
5. "Salsa in Paradise" (Bum Bum version) – 5:00
6. "Going Back to My Roots" (Pianoappella version) – 3:15

12": On the Beat / OTB 1385-6 (France)

1. "Going Back to My Roots" (club mix) – 5:30
2. "Going Back to My Roots" – 3:40
3. "Rich in Paradise" (club mix) – 5:30
4. "Rich in Paradise" (single version) – 3:36

12" & CD: ZYX / ZYX 6256-12 (Germany)

1. "Going Back to My Roots" – 5:25
2. "Rich in Paradise" – 5:25
3. "Piano Paradise" – 1:40

12" & CD: ZYX / ZYX 6256R-12 (Germany)

1. "Going Back to My Roots" (remix version) – 5:05
2. "Salsa in Paradise" (Bum Bum version) – 5:00
3. "Going Back to My Roots" (Pianoappella version) – 3:15

12" & CD: ZYX / ZYX 6290-12 (Germany)

1. "Going Back to My Roots" (vocal mix) – 5:50
2. "Rich in Paradise" (original version) – 5:30
3. "Going Back to My Roots" (Pianoappella) – 3:15

12" Rumour / RUMAT 9 (UK)

1. "Going Back to My Roots" – 5:30
2. "Rich in Paradise" – 5:30
3. "Piano Paradise" – 1:38

12": Rumour / RUMAX 9 (UK)

1. "Going Back to My Roots" (vocal remix)
2. "Rich in Paradise" (original version)
3. "Going Back to My Roots" (remix)
4. "Salsa in Paradise" (Boom Boom version)

==== Later releases ====
12": 99 North / 99 NTH 17 (UK, 1999)

1. "Rich in Paradise / Going Back to My Roots" (DnD classic vocal mix) – 6:45
2. "Rich in Paradise / Going Back to My Roots" (Philter's Good Time mix) – 6:46
3. "Rich in Paradise / Going Back to My Roots" (Loop Da Loop's full vocal mix) – 5:16

12": 99 North / 99 NTH 17R (UK, 1999)

1. "Rich in Paradise / Going Back to My Roots" (The Phantom's Big Bash mix) – 6:44
2. "Rich in Paradise / Going Back to My Roots" (DnD Bonus Dubb) – 5:40
3. "Rich in Paradise / Going Back to My Roots" (original FPI mix) – 5:50

CD: 99 North / CD NTH 17 (UK, 1999)

1. "Rich in Paradise / Going Back to My Roots" (DnD classic radio mix) – 3:30
2. "Rich in Paradise / Going Back to My Roots" (Java remix) – 7:56
3. "Rich in Paradise / Going Back to My Roots" (original FPI mix) – 5:50

12": Simple Vinyl / S12DJ096 (UK, 2003)

1. "Going Back to My Roots" (original vocal mix) – 5:50
2. "Rich in Paradise" (original mix) – 5:30
3. "Piano in Paradise" (bonus mix) – 1:40

12": Simple Vinyl / S12DJ096 (UK, 2005)

1. "Going Back to My Roots" (original vocal mix) – 5:50
2. "Rich in Paradise" (original mix) – 5:26
3. "Going Back to My Roots" (LuvDup remix) – 8:03
4. "Going Back to My Roots" (Hannu remix) – 6:22

12": J / JV 003 (Italy, 2005)

1. "Going Back to My Roots" (extended rmx 2005) – 6:23
2. "Going Back to My Roots" (original rmx 2005) – 4:38
3. "Rich in Paradise" (original mix) – 4:35

Digital: In the Music / ITM 061 (Italy, 2014)

1. "Rich in Paradise (Going Back to My Roots)" (vocal remix) – 5:51
2. "Rich in Paradise (Going Back to My Roots)" (Pianoappella) – 3:16
3. "Rich in Paradise (Going Back to My Roots)" (vocal dance remix) – 5:08
4. "Rich in Paradise (Going Back to My Roots)" – 5:27
5. "Rich in Paradise" – 5:27
6. "Salsa in Paradise" – 5:00
7. "Rich in Paradise (Going Back to My Roots)" (instrumental dance mix) – 4:47
8. "Rich in Paradise (Going Back to My Roots)" (instrumental remix) – 5:07
9. "Piano in Paradise" – 1:40

Digital: Snatch! / SNATCH114 (UK, 2018)

1. "Rich in Paradise (Going Back to My Roots)" (Soul Speech remix) – 8:37
2. "Rich in Paradise (Going Back to My Roots)" (Soul Speech dub mix) – 6:39

Digital: Just Entertainment / JD 1085 (Italy, 2018)

1. "Rich in Paradise (Going Back to My Roots)" (Flashmob 2018 dub remix) – 6:29
2. "Rich in Paradise (Going Back to My Roots)" (Flashmob 2018 vocal remix) – 5:25

=== Charts ===
==== Weekly charts ====
Chart (1989–90)	Peak position
Austria (Ö3 Austria Top 40)	5
Belgium (Ultratop 50 Flanders)	36
Ireland (IRMA)	15
Netherlands (Dutch Top 40)	15
Netherlands (Single Top 100)	13
Switzerland (Schweizer Hitparade)	10
UK Singles (Official Charts)	9
West Germany (GfK)	5

Chart (1994)	Peak position
UK Dance Singles Chart (OCC)	12

Chart (1999)	Peak position
UK Singles (Official Charts)	96

==== Year-end charts ====
Chart (1990)	Position
UK Club Chart (Record Mirror)	29

== Linda Clifford version ==
The song was covered by Linda Clifford in 2002 which charted for a single week at No. 85 on the UK Singles Chart.
