= Running Around Town =

1995 single by Billie Ray Martin

Single by Billie Ray Martin

from the album Deadline for My Memories
- Released: 1995
- Genre: Electro-pop; house; trance
- Length: 3:57
- Label: Magnet; Sire; EastWest
- Songwriter: Billie Ray Martin
- Producer: Brian Transeau

Billie Ray Martin singles chronology
"Your Loving Arms" (1995)	"Running Around Town" (1995)	"Imitation of Life" (1996)

Music video
- "Running Around Town" on YouTube

"Running Around Town" is a song by German artist Billie Ray Martin, the former lead singer of Electribe 101, released in 1995, by Magnet, Sire and EastWest Records, as the second single from her debut solo album, Deadline for My Memories (1995). Written by Martin and produced by Brian Transeau, the song was the follow-up to her successful debut single, "Your Loving Arms". It reached moderate success on the charts in Europe, peaking at number ten in Italy, number 19 in Finland and number 29 in the UK. It also peaked at number three on the US Billboard Hot Dance Club Play chart and number 22 on the Billboard Maxi-Singles Sales chart.

== Critical reception ==
John Bush from AllMusic described the song as "magical" electro-pop. Larry Flick from Billboard magazine wrote, "Brian "B.T." Transeau produced this smoker with a trance/house urgency that complements Martin's expectedly melodramatic performance. The two were behind the board for the easily programmable Jacob's Ladder remix." In his weekly UK chart commentary in Dotmusic, James Masterton felt the track "somehow lacks the charm of its predecessor". A reviewer from The Irish Times noted its "wonderful sweep".

Music Week gave it three out of five, adding, "Martin's voice isn't to all tastes but she works with the right producers (BT in this case), and this uptempo dance record has claims on a chart place." Rupert Howe from NME wrote, "And even though 'Running Around Town' is not quite the devilish swoon that 'Your Loving Arms' was, the vocal's endorphin disco rush should see off any of the current crop of weak-kneed Euro-pap pretenders." The RM Dance Update named it "another great vocal performance and a club smash". Record Mirror editor James Hamilton described it as a "trancey groove" in his weekly dance column. J.D. Considine for Vibe said that the singer "adds oomph" to a "hard-thumping workout".

== Track listing ==
- 12" single, UK
1. "Running Around Town" (BT's Jacobs Ladder Mix) — 13:13
2. "Running Around Town" (BT's Shelter Mix) — 7:01
3. "Running Around Town" (Extended Mix) — 5:27
- CD single, UK & Europe
1. "Running Around Town" (7" Mix) — 3:57
2. "Running Around Town" (BT's Jacobs Ladder Mix) — 13:09
3. "Your Loving Arms" (Brothers in Rhythm Edited Club Mix) — 6:49
- CD maxi, US
1. "Running Around Town" (7" Mix) — 3:55
2. "Running Around Town" (BT's Jacobs Ladder Mix) — 13:12
3. "Running Around Town" (Extended Mix) — 5:27
4. "Running Around Town" (BT's Shelter Mix) — 7:01
5. "Running Around Town" (Junior's Mix) — 11:04
6. "Your Loving Arms" (Brothers in Rhythm Edited Club Mix) — 6:49

== Charts ==
Chart (1995)	Peak position
Australia (ARIA)	101
Finland (Suomen virallinen lista)	19
Israel (Israeli Singles Chart)	23
Italy (Musica e dischi)	10
Scotland (OCC)	37
UK Singles (OCC)	29
UK Dance (OCC)	2
UK Cool Cuts (Music Week)	1
US Dance Club Songs (Billboard)	3
US Maxi-Singles Sales (Billboard)	22
