= Chrysalis (band) =

Chrysalis were an American folk/rock band formed in Ithaca, NY in 1966. The band released only one album before breaking up in 1970, though several additional recordings were later released. The band consisted of Paul Album (bass), James Spider Barbarous (guitar, vocals), Dahaud Elias Shaar (percussion), Nancy Nairn (vocals), John Sabin (guitar) and Ralph Kotkov (keyboards).

The band's one album, Definition, released through MGM, is considered "a lost masterpiece". The album features orchestral drama, jazzy piano motifs and world beat rhythms, along with short comedy skits. The band wanted the album to be produced by Frank Zappa, a fan of the group who described them as "a group that has yet to destroy your mind", but he declined due to issues with MGM/Verve. Instead, the album went through several production teams. The album was re-released in 2011, featuring extensive liner notes and eight bonus tracks from the albums' recording sessions.

Kotkov became a songwriter, penning If You're Lookin' for a Way Out, a UK top ten single in 1980 for disco band Odyssey.
