= Dillon & Dickins =

UK musical group

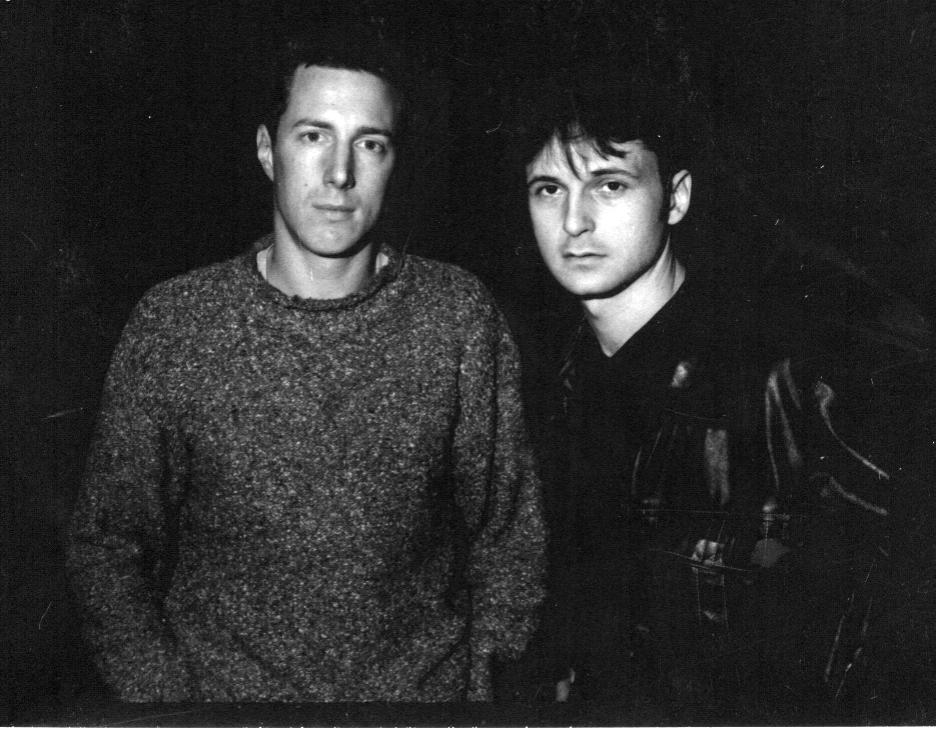

Background information
- Also known as: 99 Allstars; Crazy Prophylactic; Dillon; Disco Biscuit; DPD; European Express; Gorgeous Darlings; Groovoid; Higher State; Illicit; Kartoid; Lentil Love Cake; Mesozoik; Miss Stuck-Up; NASA; On The Blag; Sleeze Queen; Sound Environment; Spacebase; Swag Bag; Upstate
- Origin: London, England
- Genres: Dance, house, garage
- Years active: 1992–present
- Labels: Higher State, 99 North, 99 Degrees
- Members: Marc Dillon; Patrick Dickins
- Website: www.higherstate.co.uk MySpace Page

Dillon & Dickins is a dance music production group based in London, England, and one of the many aliases used by house music producers and DJs Marc Dillon and Patrick Dickins who also founded the dance record company and music publishing company Higher State. Other aliases include the commonly miss-spelt Dillon & Dickens, Dpd, 99 Allstars, Disco Biscuit, Sound Environment, Spacebase, Upstate and their more successful one, Illicit.

== Career ==
As Dillon & Dickins, their Steers & Queers EP (catalogue numbers 99NTH15 & CDNTH15), released on Higher State's sublabel 99 North in May 1999, contained a track entitled "Queers R Doin It" which was used in the U.S. TV series Queer as Folk.

Having released a number of unofficial so-called mashup songs under the alias of Illicit, one of their first official releases under this alias was "Pulsation" featuring Shannon, released on 99 North in 2000.

However, their most successful chart bound release was "Cheeky Armada", released in September 2001 on Azuli's Yola label, which reached number 72 on the UK Singles Chart. This was a re-vocalised and replayed version of one of their mashup songs called "Sneaky Armada", which combined Groove Armada's "I See You Baby" with Teddy Pendergrass's "You Can't Hide from Yourself". This single also featured the vocals of Gram'ma Funk, who performed the original vocals on "I See You Baby".

Under the alias of Dillon & Dickins, notable remixes include those of Vengaboys' "Cheekah Bow Bow (That Computer Song)", Blackout's "Gotta Have Hope" (which included an interpolation of the classical music piece Also sprach Zarathustra by Richard Strauss, and which also reached number 46 in the UK in March 1999), Todd Terry's "It's Over Love" (which also featured Shannon on vocals), Gala's "Freed from Desire" and Martha Wash and RuPaul's cover version of the Weather Girls' "It's Raining Men".

As Illicit, remixes include Alcazar's "Crying at the Discoteque", Cyndi Lauper's "Shine", Madison Avenue's "Who the Hell Are You", Cher's "Song for the Lonely", Stevie Nicks' "Planets of the Universe", Kylie Minogue's "Butterfly", India.Arie's "Brown Skin" and Etta James "Miss You", the latter of which was used in the soundtrack of the second season of the U.S. TV series Queer as Folk.

They have also contributed music for the UK film Shoot the DJ which was released in 2010 by Sonic Hub Films and directed by Sean J Vincent, Dan Peters, Andre Renner and Kim Wilde's brother Ricky Wilde. Both Ricky and Kim Wilde are cast in the film alongside Tony Hadley and Normski.

"Digigen", the first single from their album Exquisite Illicit, was released on 2 September 2011 and featured the then 13-year-old South London based rapper Sonny. This was subsequently followed by "Nite Moves" featuring the vocals of Rose Windross, released on 16 December 2012. The album was released on 10 February 2012.

== Discography ==
=== Albums ===
==== Dillon & Dickins ====
- 2012 Exquisite Illicit

==== 99 Allstars ====
- 1997 Metal Can Collection

=== Singles and EPs ===
==== Dillon & Dickins ====
- 1999 Steers & Queers EP
- 2000 "Stop the Groove"
- 2007 "Shake It Like a Jamaican" (feat. Gram'ma Funk) / "Smash the Computer Up" (feat. Dog Ears Montana)
- 2011 "Digigen" (feat. Sonny)
- 2011 "Nite Moves" (feat. Rose Windross)

==== Illicit ====
- 2000 "Cheeky Armada" (feat. Gramma Funk)
- 2000 "Pulsation" (feat. Shannon)

==== 99 Allstars ====
- 1996 Allstars EP Vol 1
- 1996 Allstars EP Vol 2
- 1996 "Luv Is All You Need"
- 1998 "Soakin' Wet"
- 1998 "Chemical Generation"
- 2001 "Space Sensation" / "Loverman"

==== Spacebase ====
- 1993 "I Need You"
- 1994 "Release"
- 1996 "Patience" / "Frustration"
- 1998 "What Am I Gonna Do" (feat. Kate Cameron)

==== Other aliases ====
- 1992 Groovoid Until U Drop EP
- 1992 Mesozoik The Future EP
- 1992 Kartoid Kartoid EP
- 1992 Dillon "Make It Take It"
- 1993 Sound Environment "Natural High"
- 1993 Crazy Prophylactic "Reach"
- 1993 Disco Biscuit "Disco Biscuit"
- 1993 Lentil Lovecake "Don't Desert Me"
- 1993 Sound Environment "Natural High (The Remixes)"
- 1993 NASA "Secret"
- 1993 Sound Environment "Feel So High"
- 1993 Disco Biscuit "Disco Biscuit (Remixes)"
- 1994 Higher State "Trust"
- 1994 On the Blag Working Jocks E.P. Vol. 1
- 1994 Swag Bag The Money EP
- 1994 European Express "Heaven"
- 1994 Sound Environment Had Enough E.P.
- 1994 Lentil Lovecake "Let Me See"
- 1995 Gorgeous Darlings "I Want U"
- 1995 Miss Stuck-Up "Stick Together"
- 1995 Upstate "I Get High"
- 1996 Gorgeous Darlings "Boy U Take Me" / "Alright" / "Angel"
- 1996 Upstate "I Get High (Remixes)"
- 1996 Disco Biscuit "Disco Biscuit (Remixes)"
- 1996 DPD featuring Rose Windross "Sign Your Name" / "Problem Child"

=== Remixes ===
==== Higher State ====
- 1993 Nootropic "Nu-Reality"
- 1994 Semper "Forever"
- 1994 The Numerical Value "Krazy Noise"
- 1994 Happy Larry's Big Beat Orchestra "Lego Beat"
- 1995 Black River "Kill Dem Off"

==== Dillon & Dickins ====
- 1994 Euphonix "Love Divine"
- 1995 Natural Born Grooves "Forerunner"
- 1996 Movin' Melodies "Rollerblade"
- 1996 Bizarre Inc "Playing with Knives"
- 1997 Jimmy Somerville "Dark Sky"
- 1997 United States of Erica "I'm So Sick of Models"
- 1997 Mood II Swing "All Night Long"
- 1997 The Experts "I'll Take You There"
- 1997 Gifted "Do I"
- 1997 Anthony & Georgio "Equilibrium"
- 1997 Gala "Freed from Desire"
- 1997 Spellbound "Heaven on Earth"
- 1997 Kool World Productions "Invader"
- 1997 Todd Terry Presents Shannon "It's Over Love"
- 1997 Martha Wash feat. RuPaul "It's Raining Men"
- 1997 Mad Moses "Panther Party"
- 1997 Todd Terry "Ready for a New Day"
- 1997 Blackout "Gotta Have Hope"
- 1998 The Quest Project "Angel"
- 1998 High Society "Feel the Love"
- 1998 Discotecs "Playmate Puzzle"
- 1998 Rachel McFarlane "Lover"
- 1998 State of Mind - This Is It
- 1998 Prophets of Sound "High"
- 1998 Dubstar "I Will Be Your Girlfriend"
- 1998 The Taste Xperience feat. Natasha Pearl "Summersault"
- 1999 Dirty Habit "Ready to Rock"
- 1999 Turbo Funk "Strong"
- 1999 Emilíana Torrini "To Be Free"
- 2000 Vengaboys "Cheekah Bow Bow (That Computer Song)"
- 2000 Dapa Doosa "Make It Right"

==== Illicit ====
- 1998 The Grant Nelson Project feat. Jean McClain "Step 2 Me"
- 2000 Madison Avenue "Who the Hell Are You"
- 2000 Jazzy M "Jazzin' The Way You Know"
- 2000 Afro Medusa "Pasilda"
- 2000 The Love Bite "Take Your Time"
- 2000 Red Snapper "The Rough & the Quick"
- 2000 Beatroute "Be Yourself"
- 2001 India.Arie "Brown Skin"
- 2001 Kylie Minogue "Butterfly"
- 2001 Alcazar "Crying at the Discoteque"
- 2001 Enrique Iglesias "Escape"
- 2001 Heather Small "Proud"
- 2001 Alizée "Gourmandises"
- 2001 Class A "Hit Me"
- 2001 Cher "Song for the Lonely"
- 2001 Viola "Little Girl"
- 2001 Dark Flower "Love Will Bring Us Back Together"
- 2001 Etta James "Miss You"
- 2001 Alizée "Moi... Lolita"
- 2001 Stevie Nicks "Planets of the Universe"
- 2001 Sunkids "Rise Up"
- 2001 Honeyz "Talk to the Hand"
- 2001 Maxee "This Is Where I Wanna Be"
- 2001 Hear'Say "Everybody"
- 2001 Kaci "Tu Amor"
- 2001 Usher "U Remind Me"
- 2001 Mary Griffin "Without You"
- 2001 Amber "Yes!"
- 2002 Lamya "Empires (Bring Me Men)"
- 2002 Heather Headley "He Is"
- 2002 S Club Juniors "New Direction"
- 2002 Jarvis Church "Shake It Off"
- 2002 Cyndi Lauper "Shine"
- 2002 Mary J. Blige "Family Affair"
- 2003 Alizée "J'en ai marre!"
- 2003 S Club "Love Ain't Gonna Wait for You"
- 2003 Emma Bunton "Maybe"
- 2003 Christina Christian "TNT"
- 2003 VS "Make It Hot"
- 2003 Girls Aloud "Some Kind of Miracle"
- 2003 Lisa Scott-Lee "Too Far Gone"
- 2003 Good Sex Valdes "Want Your Wife"
- 2003 Thicke "When I Get You Alone"
- 2003 Zoë Birkett "Treat Me Like a Lady"
- 2003 Kym Marsh "Come On Over"
