= Odyssey (band) =

American-British band

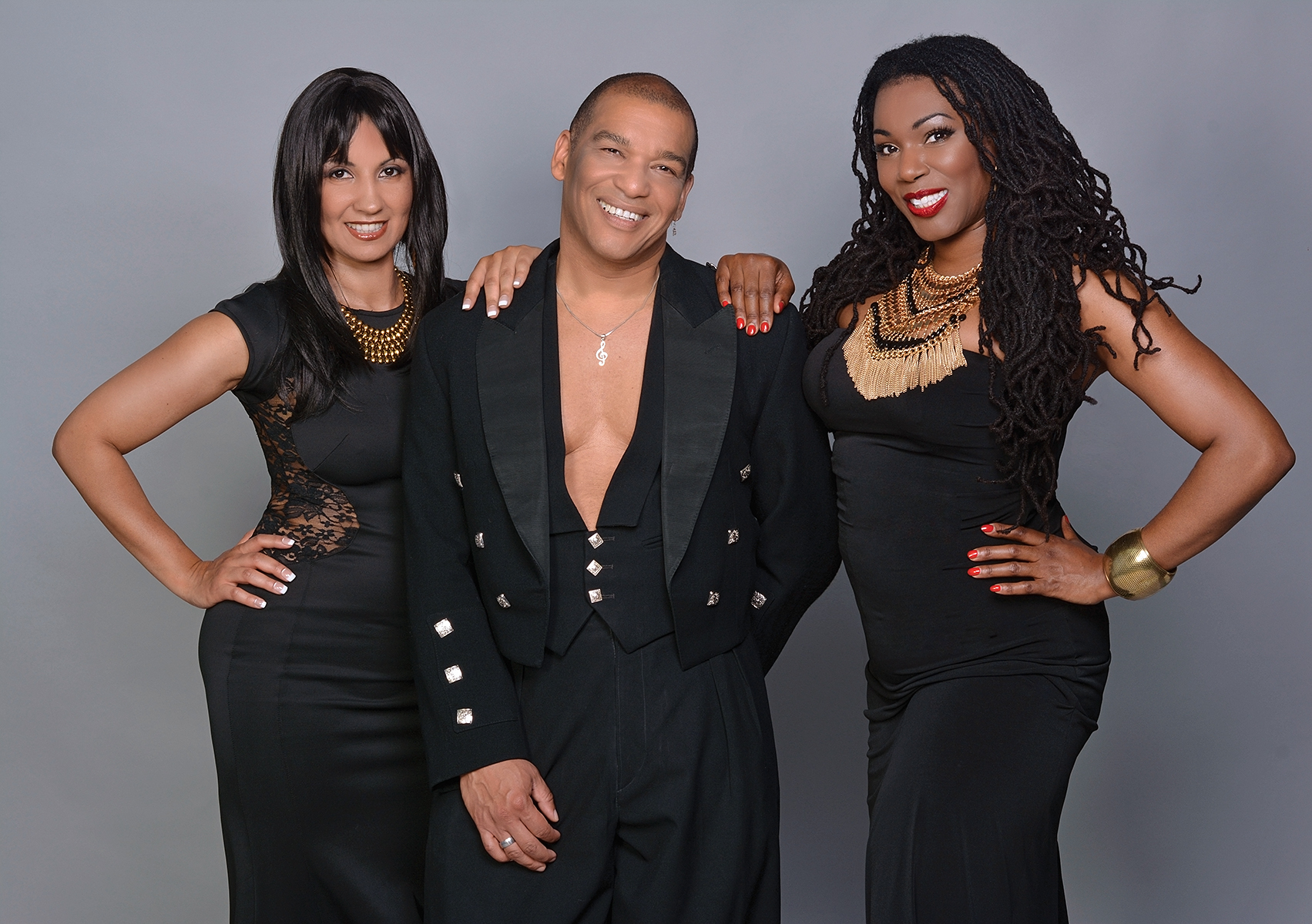

Background information
- Origin: New York City, U.S.
- Genres: Disco; soul
- Years active: 1977–present
- Labels: RCA; ISM
- Members: Steven Collazo; KayJay Sutherland; Michelle John
- Past members: Lillian Lopez; Louise Lopez; Carmen Lopez; Tony Reynolds; Bill McEachern; Al Jackson; Annis Peters; Anne Peters; Romina Johnson

Odyssey is a vocal trio originally from New York City, who are best known for their disco hits including "Native New Yorker" (1977), "Use It Up and Wear It Out" (1980), and "Going Back to My Roots" (1981). Now based in the United Kingdom, the band is led and fronted by Steven Collazo and continues to perform and record.

== Career ==
The group began as the Connecticut-born "Lopez Sisters", featuring Steven Collazo's mother, Lillian Arnille Lopez-Jackson (formerly Collazo; November 16, 1935 – September 4, 2012), Louise Lopez (February 22, 1933 – January 28, 2015), and Carmen B. Lopez Gouveia (July 12, 1934 - April 22, 2016), the latter having left the group before Odyssey, as the act would come to be known after her departure, was conceived.

Filipino bassist and singer Tony Reynolds joined the group soon after "Native New Yorker" reached no. 21 on the Billboard Hot 100, no. 5 in the UK Singles Chart. A string of albums and singles followed and the group managed another R&B chart hit, "Inside Out", written by Jesse Rae, produced by Jimmy Douglass and featuring music performed by session musicians. It peaked on the US R&B charts at no. 12 and in the UK went to no. 3 in 1982. The song was ranked at number 15 among the "Tracks of the Year" for 1982 by NME.

Reynolds, for unknown reasons, left after the first album and was replaced by Fayetteville, North Carolina, native William "Bill" McEachern, who remained with the group throughout the remainder of its RCA Records output. During that time, Brooklyn-born Steven Collazo joined the group as keyboardist, vocalist and musical director. Tony Reynolds died on February 2, 2010, in Jamaica, Queens, New York.

In the United Kingdom, the band, with its diverse musical style had more chart success, totalling five top ten hits between 1977 and 1982. One of them, "Use It Up and Wear It Out", reached number one in the UK Singles Chart for two weeks in 1980, making it the third single of the year by a US act (after Fern Kinney and M.A.S.H.) to reach number one in the UK without charting in their home country. The UK follow-up single, "If You're Lookin' for a Way Out" had Lillian Lopez on lead vocals; the single reaching no. 6 in 1980 and spending a total of fifteen weeks in the UK chart. Their next hit, "Going Back to My Roots", was written and originally recorded by Lamont Dozier.

After leaving RCA, Odyssey, composed of lead vocalist Lillian Lopez, Al Jackson and Steven Collazo, continued touring, performing, and making television appearances throughout the United Kingdom, Europe and the Middle East. Lopez and Jackson married in 2000 and retired from the music industry in 2003. Lopez died on September 4, 2012, of cancer.

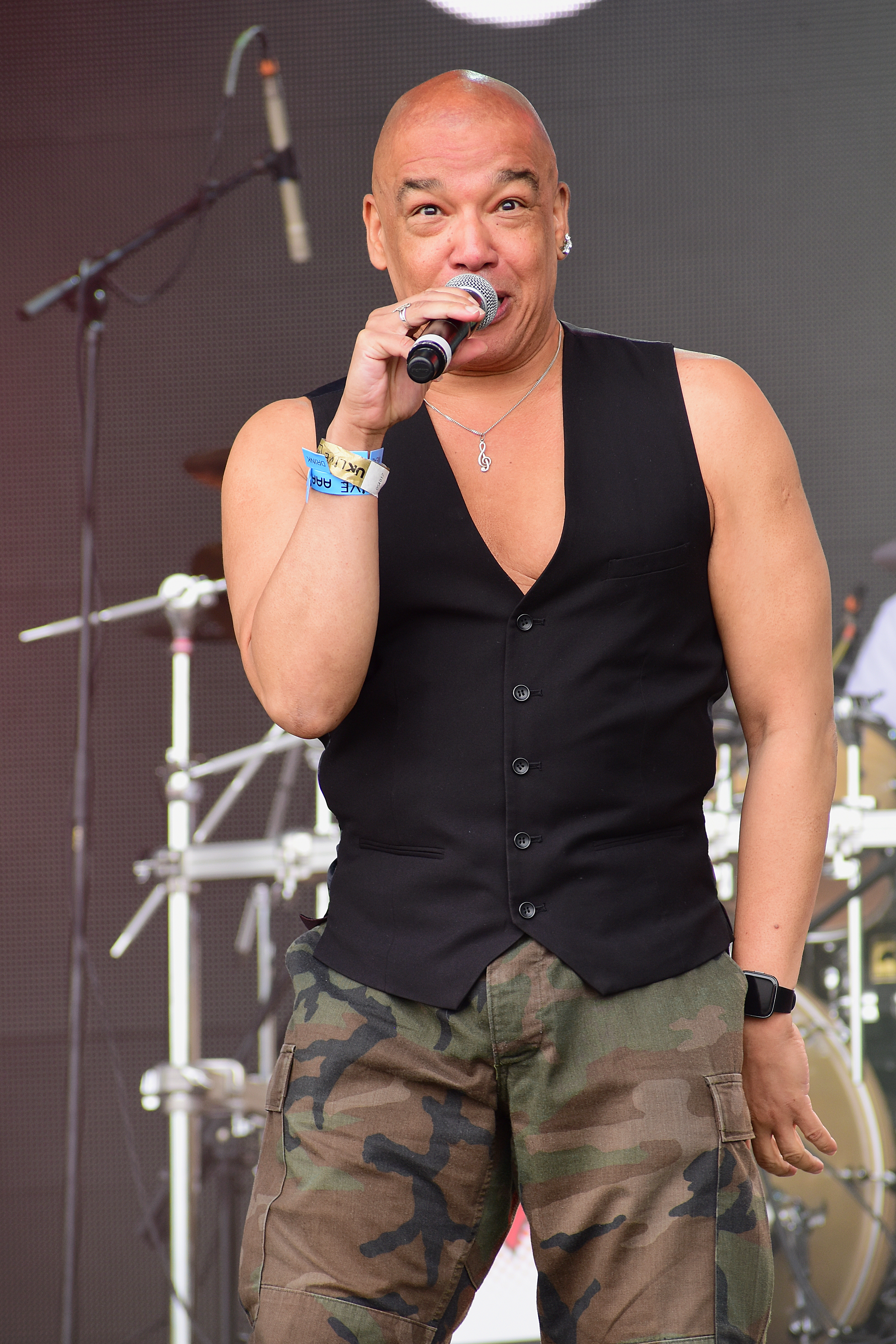
Steven Collazo performing at Let's Rock Liverpool, July 31, 2021. Photograph by Andrew D. Hurley

== Legacy ==
Odyssey's "If You're Looking for a Way Out" was covered by Tindersticks on their 1999 album, Simple Pleasure. "Inside Out" was covered by Electribe 101 on their 1990 album Electribal Memories and subsequently released as a single. Other covers of Odyssey's material include "Don't Tell Me Tell Her" by Phyllis Hyman and "Native New Yorker" by Esther Phillips, amongst others. The band, now led by Steven Collazo, featured vocalist twins Annis and Anne Peters and released the album Legacy in June 2011 on ISM Records. The twins left the group in January 2013, and were replaced by song stylist Jerdene Wilson and recording artist Romina Johnson. Johnson is known for her vocals and collaboration with Artful Dodger on the 2000 hit song "Movin' Too Fast". In 2014–15, Odyssey released their Together EP via ISM records.

== Discography ==
=== Studio albums ===
Year	Title	Peak chart positions							Record label
Year	Title	US	US R&B	AUS	CAN	NLD	SWE	UK	Record label
1977	Odyssey	36	16	98	47	—	—	—	RCA Victor
1978	Hollywood Party Tonight	123	72	—	—	—	—	—	RCA Victor
1980	Hang Together	181	66	—	—	—	—	38	RCA Victor
1981	I Got the Melody	175	62	—	—	25	37	29	RCA Victor
1982	Happy Together	—	23	—	—	—	—	21	RCA Victor
1985	Joy	—	—	—	—	—	—	—	Society Hill
2011	Legacy	—	—	—	—	—	—	—	ISM
2014	Together EP	—	—	—	—	—	—	—	ISM
"—" denotes a recording that did not chart or was not released in that territory.

=== Compilation albums ===
Year	Title	Peaks	Certifications	Record label
Year	Title	UK	Certifications	Record label
1981	The Best of Odyssey	—	BPI: Silver	RCA Victor
1982	The Magic Touch of Odyssey	69		Telstar
1987	The Greatest Hits	26	BPI: Silver	Stylus
1989	Greatest Hits	—		RCA
1990	Native New Yorker: Golden Classics	—		Collectables
2005	Legends	—		Sony
2010	The Greatest Hits	—	BPI: Silver	Sony
"—" denotes a recording that did not chart or was not released in that territory.

=== Singles ===
Year	Title	Peak chart positions									Certifications	Album
Year	Title	US	US R&B	US Dance	CAN	GER	IRE	NLD	SWE	UK	Certifications	Album
1977	"Native New Yorker"	21	6	3	13	—	7	—	—	5	BPI: Silver	Odyssey
1978	"Easy Come, Easy Go"	—	—	3	—	—	—	—	—	—		Odyssey
1978	"Weekend Lover"	57	37	—	75	—	—	—	—	—		Odyssey
1978	"Single Again" / "What Time Does the Balloon; Go Up" (medley)	107	—	—	—	—	—	—	—	—		Hollywood Party Tonight
1979	"Lucky Star"	—	—	—	—	—	—	—	—	—		Hollywood Party Tonight
1980	"Don't Tell Me, Tell Her"	105	44	6	—	—	—	—	—	—		Hang Together
1980	"Use It Up and Wear It Out"	—	—	6	—	20	—	2	—	1	BPI: Silver	Hang Together
1980	"If You're Lookin' for a Way Out"	—	—	—	—	—	9	—	—	6	BPI: Silver	Hang Together
1981	"Hang Together"	—	—	—	—	—	—	—	—	36		Hang Together
1981	"Going Back to My Roots"	—	68	55	—	13	13	3	3	4	BPI: Silver	I Got the Melody
1981	"It Will Be Alright"	—	—	—	—	—	—	—	—	43		I Got the Melody
1982	"Inside Out"	104	12	25	—	—	2	22	—	3	BPI: Silver	Happy Together
1982	"Magic Touch"	—	—	—	—	—	—	—	—	41		Happy Together
1985	"(Joy) I Know It"	—	—	—	—	—	—	—	—	51		Singles only
1987	"Inside Out ('87 Remix)"	—	—	—	—	—	—	—	—	86		Singles only
1987	"Back to My Roots (Remix)"	—	—	—	—	—	—	67	—	—		Singles only
2014	"Sooner or Later (featuring Romina Johnson)"	—	—	—	—	—	—	—	—	—		Singles only
2017	"Native New Yorker" (40th Anniversary Version)	—	—	—	—	—	—	—	—	—		Singles only
"—" denotes a recording that did not chart or was not released in that territory.
