= Deep Heat 5 – Feed the Fever =

Compilation album by Deep Heat
- Released: 1990
- Genre: House
- Label: Telstar

Deep Heat chronology
Deep Heat 89 – Fight the Flame	Deep Heat 5 – Feed the Fever	Deep Heat 6 – The Sixth Sense

Deep Heat 5 – Feed the Fever is a continuation of Telstar Records' Deep Heat compilation series released in February 1990. Containing 32 dance tracks, it continued the series' success, reaching #1 on the Compilations Chart and being awarded a UK gold disc for album sales in excess of 100,000 copies. As with the rest of the series, the album features dance music styles of the time including techno, acid house and hip house.

== Track listing ==
Disc One

1. Silver Bullet - "20 Seconds to Comply" (Final Conflict Mix) (3:48)
2. 2 in a Room - "Somebody in the House Say Yeah!" (3:41)
3. FPI Project featuring Paolo Dini - "Going Back to My Roots" (3:19)
4. The Beatmasters featuring Claudia Fontaine - "Warm Love" (Soulsonic Mix) (3:37)
5. K.C. Flight - "Planet E" (3:32)
6. Frankie Knuckles - "Move Your Body" (3:51)
7. Sybil - "All Through the Night" (Good Vibrations Mix) (3:48)
8. Latino Rave - "Deep Heat '89" (3:48) (Note: Not actually a single track but a megamix featuring short samples of: Technotronic - "Pump Up the Jam" Stakker Humanoid - "Humanoid" Black Riot - "A Day in the Life" LNR - "Work It to the Bone" Fast Eddie - "I Can Dance" A Guy Called Gerald - "Voodoo Ray" Starlight - Numero Uno The Todd Terry Project - "Bango" Raze - "Break 4 Love" Sugar Bear - "Don't Scandalise Mine")
9. The Mixmaster - "Grand Piano" (3:47)
10. J.D. - "Good Vibrations" (3:31)
11. Lee Marrow - "Pain" (3:54)
12. Eddie "Flashin" Fowlkes - "Goodbye Kiss" (3:39)
13. Shay Jones - "Time to Party" (4:11)
14. Homeboy - "Sunshine & Brick" (3:46)
15. Maurizio Pavesi featuring Lisa Scott - "Love System" (3:29)
16. Reese - "The Heavens" (3:46)

Disc Two

1. Rob'n'Raz featuring Leila K - "Got to Get" (3:41)
2. Santos - "Yor Wish Is My Command" (2:54)
3. Attillas - "Seduzieteu" (Champagne Mix) (3:21)
4. Lips-Kiss - "Lambada" (3:41)
5. Pandella - "This Way, That Way" (3:57)
6. The Beat Club - "Security" (Club Mix) (3:45)
7. TOT - "What U R" (Rhythm Mix) (3:47)
8. Inner City - "The Paradise Megamix" (7:03)
9. Adeva - "I Thank You" (3:12)
10. De La Soul - "Eye Know" (3:56)
11. Intense - "Dog a Bassline" (4:23)
12. 92nd & 5th - "What's Done Is Done" (3:57)
13. John Helmer - "Deep" (3:56)
14. Julie X - "Believe" (3:36)
15. Invision - "Don't Break the Rules" (Trouble's 'Broken the Rules' Mix) (3:28)
16. The Menz Club - "Burn the House Down" (1989 Remix) (4:36)
