= The Space Brothers =

British trance music duo

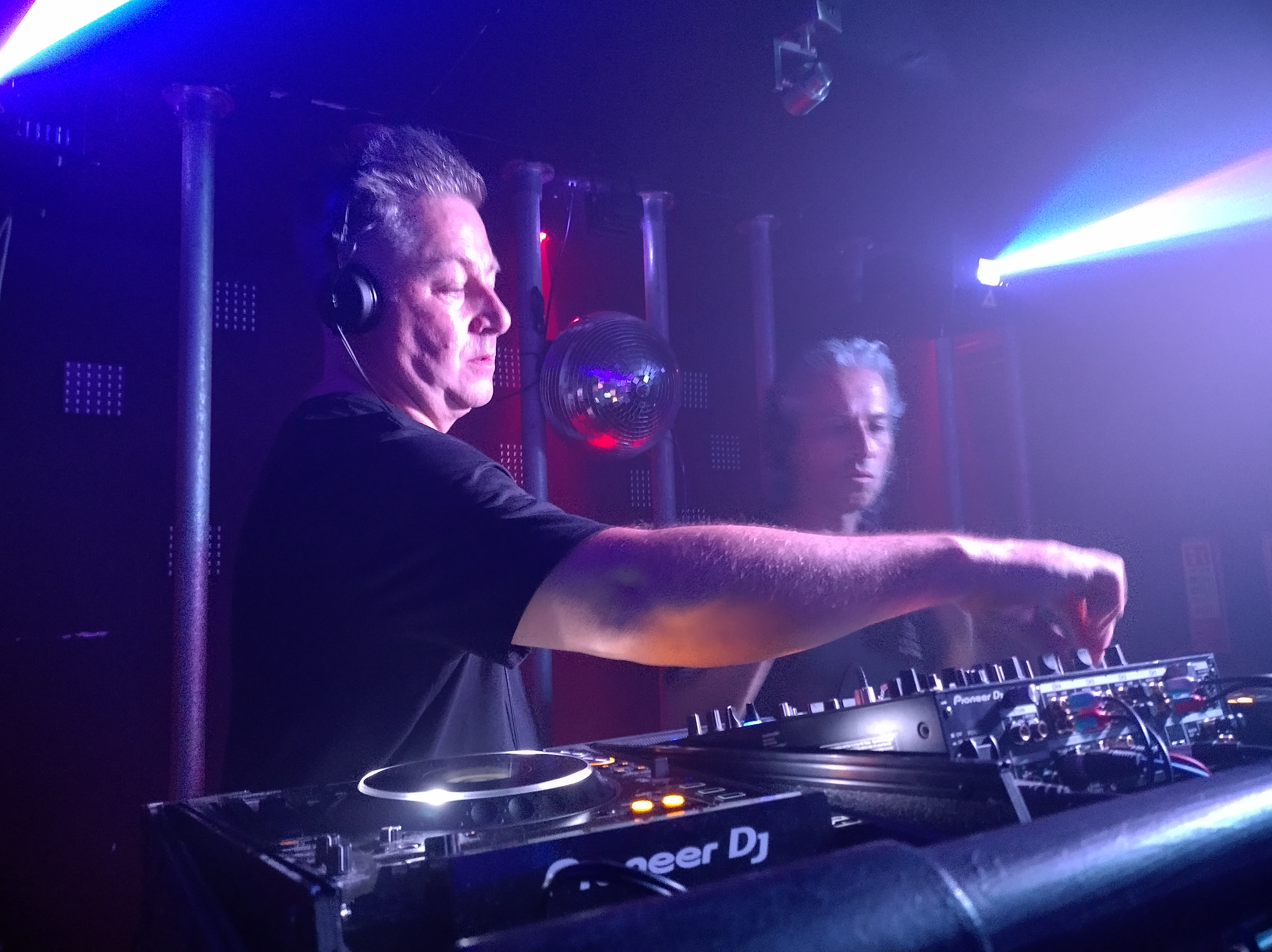
- Stephen Jones (left) and Ricky Simmonds (right), aka, The Space Brothers, performing at Evolve, Sheffield, June 2022

Background information
- Also known as: Ascension, Chakra, Essence, Force Majeure, Kamilian, Klymax, Lamai, Lustral, Oxygen, Sapphire, Simmonds & Jones, The Realm, Ultra High
- Origin: United Kingdom
- Genres: Trance
- Years active: 1997–present
- Labels: Manifesto, Warner Records, Lost Language, Perfecto, Armada Music, Xtravaganza, Boss
- Members: Richard Simmonds; Stephen Jones
- Website: https://www.thespacebrothers.com/

The Space Brothers are a British trance music duo comprising Richard 'Ricky' Louis Simmonds and Stephen Christopher Jones, noted for producing under a variety of pseudonyms such as Chakra, Lustral, Ascension, Essence, Ultra High, Lamai and The Realm.

== Career ==
Their debut production "Stay with Me" (released as Ultra High) garnered club interest and reached No. 36 on the UK Singles Chart in December 1995. Whereas "Stay with Me" epitomised the hardbag sound, their next release "I Am" (as Chakra) was to showcase a darker, ethereal and more progressive trance based sound. "I Am" caught the ears of Sasha and John Digweed (the latter of whom submitted a remix of the track alongside Nick Muir in their Bedrock guise). "I Am" peaked at No. 24 on the UK Singles Chart in January 1997.

Despite having signed to Paul Oakenfold's Perfecto imprint for the release of "Someone" - Ascension and WEA for the release of their Chakra material, the Space Brothers elected to make Manifesto Records their home, and their first Space Brothers single "Shine", appeared into the UK chart having been Pete Tong's 'essential new tune'.

The second Space Brothers release was "Forgiven (I Feel Your Love)" in November 1997. It spent a total of seven weeks in the UK chart over the course of the festive period that year. 1998 witnessed the temporary abandonment of the Space Brothers moniker, and Simmonds and Jones instead elected to focus on the output of their other sobriquets Essence, Lustral and Force Majeure. The following year saw the release of "Legacy (Show Me Love)" in July 1999. Featuring the vocals of Kate Cameron as well as a remix by Matt Darey, it reached No. 32 on the UK chart in July 1999. Also in 1999, they remixed Alena's "Turn It Around".

Shortly after the release of "Legacy (Show Me Love)" the Space Brothers unveiled their debut album Shine. To complement the album a remix disc was included in the package featuring reworked Space Brothers tracks (mostly unreleased) mixed by Paul Oakenfold. The second single from the album was "Heaven Will Come", which was released in October 1999 featuring mixes by Lange and Olmec Heads. Following the commercial success of "Legacy (Show Me Love)" and "Heaven Will Come", coupled with their album "Shine", the Space Brothers decided to take a hiatus, returning only briefly in 2001 with the Push remixed "Everywhere I Go".

The Space Brothers sobriquet has been largely inactive since this time; however, Simmonds and Jones have continued to release tracks under guises such as Ascension, The Realm, Chakra, Quadraphonic and Lamai. In late 2002, a new Space Brothers track "One More Chance" appeared as a 12" and digital download release. Recent promos circulated have featured remixes of "Everywhere I Go" and "Forgiven" (as remixed by Ian Knowles and DJ Demand) on the Liverpool based 3 Beat Records subsidiary label, Boss Records.

Most Space Brothers tracks feature the vocals of Kate Cameron, aside from "Shine" and "Forgiven (I Feel Your Love)" (Joanna Law) and "Everywhere I Go" (Talya).

2006 saw Simmonds and Jones launching the online download music store, www.audiojelly.com, where all their productions and side projects are available, along with a broad range of other dance artists and releases. 2007 saw the duo mainly active in the guise of Lustral with the release of the download album Deepest, Darkest Secrets and the double remix CD Deeper, Darker Secrets.

== As Chakra ==
Under the name Chakra, the duo produced trance music, usually sampling voices, notably working with Kate Cameron. They also collaborated under the Chakra name with the German trance music DJ Markus Schulz, notably on his album, Progression.

== As Lustral ==
In 1997, the duo appropriated Pfizer's trademark name Lustral under which they released the single "Everytime" on the Hooj Choons label. Featuring the vocals of Tracy Ackerman, "Everytime" proved to be a club hit, due to the balearic trance interpretation by Nalin & Kane, who earlier in the year had enjoyed crossover success with "Beachball".

"Everytime" failed to succeed commercially, peaking at No. 60 on the UK Singles Chart in November 1997, but reaching No. two for two weeks on the US Billboard Hot Dance Club Songs chart the following month. Some months later, Lustral released "Solace". Again featuring Tracy Ackerman, "Solace" garnered some interest but failed to materialise as a commercial release. "Solace" was remixed by Hooj Choons labelmate Medway, who released his remix as his own track on the 1999 EP The Elements EP. In November 1999, "Everytime" was reissued, this time achieving greater chart success. Featuring remixes from A Man Called Adam, Timo Maas, Mike Koglin and Way Out West to complement the 1997 original, "Everytime" peaked at No. 30 in the UK.

The Lustral project was soon set aside, with the Space Brothers focusing on their other aliases such as Chakra.

Shortly before the collapse of Hooj Choons, Lustral released "Broken" on the Hooj subsidiary Lost Language. "Broken" featured mixes from Way Out West, and the release included a reworking of "Everytime" by Yunus. Lustral has largely been dormant since then, aside from the issue of the remixed "Solace" on Lost Language in May 2005, featuring mixes from Vorontsov and Chocolate Uncle. Further promos included a new track, "The Price We Pay for Love", featuring remixes from Serge Devant and Aidan Lavelle, but this track remains unreleased.

In 2008, Lustral released their Interpretations album, followed by a double album in 2009, Lustral Presents Trance Classics. The latter was a collection of the original version of the tracks on the first CD, and ambient versions of the Interpretations album on the second. In December 2010, the track "I Feel You" was released and included a remix by John O'Callaghan.

== Discography ==
=== Albums ===
As the Space Brothers

- Shine (1999), Manifesto (featuring bonus disc mixed by Paul Oakenfold containing unreleased remixes from Medway, Planet Heaven, Lange and Matt Darey)

As Lustral

- Deepest Darkest Secrets (May 2007 download album)
- Deeper Darker Secrets (Jun 2007 2 CD remix album)
- Interpretations (2008)
- Lustral presents Trance Classics (2009 2 CD album)
- I Feel You (2010)
- Empathy (2014)

=== Singles ===
As the Space Brothers

Year	Title	Peak chart positions									Album
Year	Title	UK	UK Dance	UK Indie	BEL	DEN	EUR	IRE	NZ	SCO	Album
1997	"Shine"	23	1	—	—	—	63	—	—	18	Shine
1997	"Forgiven (I Feel Your Love)"	27	4	—	13	5	65	—	—	16	Shine
1999	"Legacy (Show Me Love)"	32	2	—	—	—	—	—	47	21	Shine
1999	"Heaven Will Come"	25	3	—	—	—	85	—	—	20	Shine
2000	"Shine 2000"	18	2	—	—	—	81	29	—	9	Non-album singles
2001	"Everywhere I Go"	—	—	—	—	—	—	—	—	—	Non-album singles
2003	"One More Chance"	100	—	25	—	—	—	—	—	78	Non-album singles
2005	"Forgiven 2005"	120	—	44	—	—	—	—	—	—	Non-album singles
2005	"Everywhere I Go 2005"	—	—	—	—	—	—	—	—	—	Non-album singles
"—" denotes items that did not chart or were not released in that territory.

As Chakra

- "I Am" (1996, WEA) - UK No. 24
- "Home" (1997, WEA) - UK No. 46
- "Love Shines Through" (1999, WEA) - UK No. 67
- "Home" (remix) (2000, WEA) - UK No. 47
- "Doors" (2003)

As Lustral

- "Everytime" (November 1997, UK No. 60)
- "Solace" (Promo only)
- "Everytime" (re-mix) (November 1999, UK No. 30)
- "Broken" (November 2002, UK No. 83)
- "Solace" (May 2005)
- "The Price We Pay for Love" (February 2007)
- "Many Years from Now" (April 2007)
- "In My Life" (October 2007)
- "I Feel You" (December 2010)

As Essence

- "The Promise" (March 1998, UK No. 27)

As Oxygen

- "Am I On Your Mind" (January 2003, UK No. 30)

As Force Majeure

- "Out Of My Mind" (May 2000, UK No. 81)

As Kamilian

- "Guidance" (June 1997, UK No. 85)

As Ultra High

- "Stay With Me" (December 1995, UK No. 36)
- "Are You Ready For Love" (July 1996, UK No. 45)
