= Use It Up and Wear It Out =

"Use It Up And Wear It Out"

Single by Odyssey

from the album Hang Together
- A-side: "Don't Tell Me, Tell Her"
- Released: 1980
- Genre: Disco
- Length: 4:10
- Label: RCA
- Songwriters: Sandy Linzer; L. Russell Brown

Odyssey singles chronology
"Don't Tell Me, Tell Her" (1980)	"Use It Up And Wear It Out" (1980)	"If You're Lookin' for a Way Out" (1980)

Music video
- "Use It Up and Wear It Out" on TopPop on YouTube

"Use It Up and Wear It Out" is a song by US-based dance and soul group Odyssey that was released as a single in 1980. It was originally released as the B-side of "Don't Tell Me, Tell Her". When it was rereleased as the A-side it would go on to spend twelve weeks on the UK Singles Chart, including two at No. 1, but failed to have any commercial success in the United States.

The song was written by Sandy Linzer and L. Russell Brown, and produced by Linzer. It was the New York-based disco group's only UK No. 1 single, spending two weeks at the top of the charts from July 26 to August 8, 1980, and was their most successful single on the UK Singles Chart. In their native United States, it failed to get into the Hot 100. However along with the track "Don't Tell Me, Tell Her", "Use It Up and Wear It Out" went to number six on the US Billboard Disco Top 100 chart.

The song was produced by Sandy Linzer and was arranged and conducted by Ray Chew. The song was also released in 1980 as a 12" single.

== Charts ==
Chart (1980)	Peak position
Belgium (Ultratop 50 Flanders)	5
Netherlands (Dutch Top 40)	4
Netherlands (Single Top 100)	2
UK Singles (Official Charts)	1
West Germany (GfK)	20

== Pat and Mick version ==
A cover by the duo Pat and Mick, produced by Stock Aitken Waterman, reached No. 22 on the UK Singles Chart in 1990.

=== Charts ===
Chart (1990)	Peak position
Belgium (Ultratop 50 Flanders)	36
UK Singles (Official Charts)	22

== Other versions ==
A version by Indigo appears on Queer as Folk 2: Same Men, New Tracks, the second soundtrack album for the UK version of Queer as Folk.
