= If You're Lookin' for a Way Out =

"If You're Lookin' For A Way Out"

Single by Odyssey

from the album Hang Together
- B-side: "Never Had It All"
- Released: 1980
- Length: 3:15
- Label: RCA Records
- Songwriter(s): Ralph Kotkov
- Producer(s): Sandy Linzer

Odyssey singles chronology
"Use It Up and Wear It Out" (1980)	"If You're Lookin' For A Way Out" (1980)	"Going Back to My Roots" (1981)

Music video
- "If You're Looking For A Way Out" on YouTube

"If You're Lookin' for a Way Out" is a 1980 song by group Odyssey from their album Hang Together. It was the second consecutive UK top 10 single in a row for the band, both gaining a silver certification in the UK. It featured Lillian Lopez on lead vocals and spent a total of fifteen weeks on the chart.

== Track listings ==
=== 7" single ===
- A "If You're Looking for a Way Out" - 3:15
- B "Never Had It All" - 3:37

=== 12" single ===
- A "If You're Looking for a way Out" - 4:29
- B "Never Had It All" - 4:23

== Charts ==
Chart	Peak position
Irish Singles Chart	9
UK Singles Chart	6
