= Jesse Rae =

- Born: William Philip Jesse Rae; 1951 (age 74–75)
- Origin: St. Boswells, Roxburghshire, Scotland
- Genres: Funk; R&B; dub; pop
- Occupations: Singer; songwriter; composer; film director; film maker
- Instruments: Vocals; bass guitar; keyboards
- Years active: 1978–present
- Labels: Bold (TK); Columbia; WEA; On-U; Luzuli Music
- Website: Jesse Rae's channel on YouTube

William Philip Jesse Rae (born 1951) is a Scottish singer, songwriter and composer from St Boswells in Scotland.

== Career ==
In the 1970s, Rae moved to the US securing work as a runner at the New York Stock Exchange to fund his stay. Through work in Cleveland and Los Angeles studios, he became acquainted with several leading soul and funk artists, including Roger Troutman, Bernie Worrell, Nairobi Sailcat and Michael Hampton from the Parliament and Funkadelic enclave.

Upon returning to the UK, he was unable to secure a recording contract, despite offering several demos. His debut single, "D.E.S.I.R.E.," was eventually released via the Miami-based TK Organisation.

In 1981, he worked with Worrell as part of the P-Funk offshoot band, Space Cadets, whose sole album was released in the US in that year. Rae also spent a brief time with members of Granicus in a band called the Boys. Rae can be heard on their album Thieves Liars and Traitors on a cut called "Taste of Love".

He worked closely with Adrian Sherwood and the Sugarhill Gang, releasing a 10 inch discomix dub.

Recently, Rae has collaborated with students from Borders College Campus(Jordan, Callum and Lukas). He has reached out to three students to help create him a website to get Brick FM (Funk and Soul of the Scottish Borders Community Radio) out to his African American friends and public. Rae is the Scottish Borders and Scotland, Funk Ambassador for The Funk Music Hall of Fame and Exhibition Centre in Dayton, Ohio, US.

== Music ==
As a songwriter, Rae is best known for the 1982 song, "Inside Out", a hit single by the band Odyssey. Rae's own version was included on his debut studio album, The Thistle. This version was featured prominently in the 2026 blockbuster film The Drama. Rae dedicated the album to "Luzuli and Senkrah and Scotland."

Rae's single "Over the Sea", reached number 65 in the UK Singles Chart in 1985. Rae directed the music video for the song at Eilean Donan and New York City. The Thistle was then released in 1987 on WEA. In 1992, he toured Japan with On-U-Sound as part of the group Strange Parcels, and released the 10-inch single "Life's a Killer Dog" / "Body Blast'n".

A second studio album, Compression was eventually released in 1996. The album was notable for being recorded via the Integrated Services Digital Network (ISDN) system, a product of the BT Group.

A remastered version of The Thistle was released by River Records in 2004 and included a DVD of three promotional videos for the songs "Over the Sea", "The Thistle" and "Chainsaw" directed by Rae in the mid-1980s.

On 21 October 2010, Rae opened for Adam Ant at the Union Chapel in London, playing a 30-minute set. On 23 May 2011, Rae was again a support act for Adam Ant, who performed at the O2 Academy in Glasgow, Scotland. On 11 December 2011, Rae played two "live music video shows" at Edinburgh, Scotland's "Voodoo Lounge" bar. In regard to the Voodoo Lounge shows, Rae explained: "I call it, my Aye Pad, using the frontier of technology using pioneering software for full interactive entertainment, and the 'Rae formula' to making Music Videos."

Rae's compilation album, The Best O' , was released on CD, with a companion CD release of rare tracks, Funk Warrior – A Collection, in July 2012. Both editions were limited to 500 copies.

A second reissue of The Thistle was released as an expanded double-CD on 12 May 2014, and features 12 unreleased mixes and four tracks previously unavailable on CD. The reissue, entitled The Thistle (Special Edition), was limited to a run of 1,000 copies (packaged in a jewel case with an eight-page booklet) and was released by Rae's own Luzuli Music label.

A 2-CD album of unreleased recordings entitled Worae was released in November 2017. Worae features instrumental tunes recorded with the late keyboardist Bernie Worrell.

A double CD album of Compression era recordings featuring unreleased tracks, titled Global '95 was released on 29 April 2021. On 8 August 2022, a 10th Anniversary reissue edition of The Best O' was also released.

Rae's 2003 album, No Surrender, was reissued on CD on 20th September 2024, retitled Nae Surrender.

The soundtrack for his unreleased film The Flesher (that includes several tracks from Nae Surrender) will be released on double vinyl in July 2026.

== Awards ==
- Winner UCLA Music Video Award 1982.
- Winner Sony Vira Award for Technical Achievement for 'Rusha'.
- The music video for the single "Over the Sea" in which Rae wears a kilt and helmet while holding a claymore, in both New York City, United States (US) and the Scottish Highlands—won a Vira award.
- Official Top One Hundred Music Videos in the World Award.
- First ISDN recording of 'Homo Phonic Line' created entirely between The USA and The Scottish Borders in real-time, for BT's 'Global 95' Album ( 1995) into 28 Countries.
- First ISDN Community Funk and Soul Radio Station, Brick FM 106, St. Boswells in Scotland, 2001
- First 24/7 William Wallace Trust Community Funk Television Station in the Scottish Borders for long-term care of The Wallace Statue in the Scottish Borders
- Broadcasting into The Funk Music Hall Of Fame and Exhibition Center in Dayton, Ohio

== Influence ==
During an October 2012 solo performance at the Paisley Abbey venue in Paisley, Scotland, Roddy Frame, formerly of Aztec Camera, performed a rendition of "Inside Out". Frame explained that during his time as a WEA artist, he was asked about Rae, who was conveyed as a Scottish musician who always wore a kilt and helmet. Frame expressed "love" for the song and explained that he enjoyed playing the song at his home.

== Politics ==
In 2007, Rae stood for the Scottish Parliament as an independent in the Scottish Borders electoral constituency of Roxburgh and Berwickshire to warn the Scottish Borders that they would be losing their high street banks and of the devastation to local shops and businesses this would cause. He gained 318 votes for a 1.2% share of the vote. He stood again in 2011 as an independent candidate in the expanded seat of Ettrick, Roxburgh and Berwickshire, this time polling 308 votes for a 1.1% share.

In the 2015 general and 2021 Scottish Parliament elections, he stood in Berwickshire, Roxburgh and Selkirk.

== Discography ==
=== Singles ===
- "D.E.S.I.R.E." / "Skydiver" – (1979 US 12" single / 1981 UK 7" & 12" single)
- "Rusha" / "Desire" – (1982 12" single)
- "(It's Just) The Dog in Me" / "Be Yourself" – (1984 12" single)
- "Over the Sea" / "Party Crackers" (edit) / "Over the Sea" (Instrumental Version)* – (1985 7", 7" picture disc & 12" single*)
- "Hou-di-ni" (edit / full version*) / "Idio-syn-crazy" – (1987 7" & 12" single*)
- "That Kind o' Girl" (Scottish Additional Mix*) / "Friend-Ship" – (1987 7" & 12" single*)
- "Body Blastin" / "Life's a Killer Dog" / "Jacob's Pillow" – (1993 10" single – 1000 copies only)
- "Ma Wee Lamb / Politics" - (2003 privately released CD-R single)
- "Global 95 EP" – (2018 12" EP)
- "Almost Ma Sel Again" - (2024 12" single - 300 copies only)

=== Albums ===
- The Thistle – (1987) LP & Cassette – Initial LP copies included free 7" single of "Over the Sea" (Video Soundtrack Mix) / "Party Crackers" (edit)
- Compression – (1996) CD
- No Surrender – (2003) CD-R - privately released
- The Thistle – (2004) CD - reissue with bonus DVD
- The Thistle – Special Edition (2014) 2CD – Limited edition of 1000
- Worae – (with Bernie Worrell) (2017) 2CD – Limited edition of 500
- Global '95 – (2021) 2CD - Limited Edition of 500
- Nae Surrender - (2024) CD - Limited Edition of 350 - retitled reissue of the original 2003 CD-R with extra track
- The Flesher - (2026) 2LP - Limited Edition of 300 - includes several tracks from Nae Surrender

=== Compilations ===
- Greatest Hits – (1999) Privately released CD-R
- Greatest Funk Hits – (with the Space Cadets) – (2000) Privately released CD-R
- The Best O' – (2012) CD – Limited edition of 500
- Funk Warrior – A Collection – (2012) CD – Limited edition of 500
- The Best O' (10th Anniversary Edition) – (2022) CD – Limited Edition of 300
