= Kate Cameron (singer) =

House and trance music singer

Kate Cameron is an English house and trance music singer with a rich alto voice. She signed with MCA in the dance/pop group GMT in 1991, releasing "Feel So Good" and "Inner City Blues" before they were dropped in 1993. Cameron then worked as a session singer, coming to prominence via her involvement with Norman Cook as the vocalist on his Pizza Man single, "P.A.S.S.I.O.N." which went on to be a hit for Jon of the Pleased Wimmin, peaking at number 27 on the UK chart in 1995. Her vocals also featured at this time on Zion Train's album Grow Together, singing lead on "Stand Up and Fight" and the single "Rise" released in 1996 on China. She subsequently made a name as the credited vocalist and writer on a multitude of dance and trance releases.

== Career ==
The first notable release as a solo artist was in 1996 on the Space Brothers production of "I Am", credited as by Chakra. Initially surfacing on the Jackpot label, "I Am" received a major release through WEA, hit number 1 in the Dance chart and peaked at number 24 on the UK Singles Chart in January 1997. A further Chakra single "Home" was released in August 1997, which featured remixes from Salt Tank and Solar Stone, and peaked at number 46.

The same year Mount Rushmore's "You Better", bearing her self-composed vocals, was first circulated on a white label with no official release; Cameron's vocal from the track was sampled by the Dutch trance act Signum, making their biggest hit to date with "What Ya Got 4 Me", which reached number 1 in the Dance Chart on release in 1997 and became a club anthem. It reached number 35 in the UK singles chart when re-released in 2002.

Cameron continued collaborating as composer and vocalist teaming up with Dillon & Dickins with "What Am I Gonna Do?", which came out as a Spacebase production, released on Higher State in 1998. A remixed version of "You Better" was also released on Universal with a remix from Victor Calderone reaching 53 in the UK chart in 1999.

Under the moniker the Space Brothers, the Chakra production team released the singles "Legacy (Show Me Love)" and "Heaven Will Come" on Manifesto, again featuring Cameron's vocals. They reached 32 and 25 in the UK charts. She appeared on further tracks on the Space Brothers' debut album, Shine and in 1999, again as Chakra, "Love Shines Through", which reached number 67 on the UK chart.

Following her many collaborations with the Space Brothers, Cameron made a guest appearance on the 2002 release "Far from in Love" by Above & Beyond. A further Chakra single, "Doors", appeared in early 2003. This appearance was shortly followed by another Space Brothers production "I Can Feel Your Love", both featuring Cameron's vocals.

She continues to be a backing vocalist in Freak Power, and since 2002 has been a tutor at BIMM, teaching voice. She became Head of the Vocals department in 2006. and achieved an MA in 2010. As of 2018, she lectures at both Sussex University and Chichester University. Her sister is Deborah Cameron, linguist at Oxford University.

== Albums ==
- Shine – The Space Brothers (Manifesto 1999 (UK))

== Singles ==
- November 1994: "Good Inside" - Ripe
- January 1997: "I Am" - Chakra (#24 UK)
- August 1997: "Home" - Chakra (#46 UK)
- November 1998: "What Ya Got 4 Me" - Signum (#70 UK)
- April 1999: "You Better" - Mount Rushmore (#54 UK)
- May 1999: "What Am I Gonna Do" - Spacebase
- July 1999: "Legacy (Show Me Love)" - Space Brothers (#32 UK)
- October 1999: "Heaven Will Come" - Space Brothers (#25 UK)
- October 1999: "Love Shines Through" - Chakra (#67 UK)
- February 2002: "What Ya Got 4 Me" (re-issue) - Signum (#35 UK)
- August 2000: "Home" (reissue) - Chakra (#UK 47)
- May 2002: "Far from in Love" - Above & Beyond
- January 2003: "Doors" - Chakra
- February 2003: "I Can Feel Your Love" - Quadraphonic
- April 2004: "I Am" (remix) - Chakra
- January 2007: "Love Shines Through" (remix)- Chakra
