= Chrysalis (sci-fi anthology) =

Science fiction anthology series

Chrysalis is a 10-volume science fiction anthology series, edited by Roy Torgeson. Vol. 1–7 (1977–1980) were published in paperback by Zebra Books and vol. 8–10 (1980–1983) were published in hardcover by Doubleday. According to The Encyclopedia of Science Fiction, Torgeson chose the anthology's title "to suggest something developing and changing and about to give birth to beauty".

== Content ==
Chrysalis regularly included original stories by noted writers such as Theodore Sturgeon, Orson Scott Card, R. A. Lafferty, Philip José Farmer, Barry N. Malzberg, Ward Moore, Michael Bishop, Tanith Lee, Roger Zelazny, Thomas F. Monteleone, Gardner Dozois, and Pat Murphy. While the bulk of the stories published in the anthology series were science fiction, it also included fantasy and horror.

== Volumes ==
- Chrysalis (1977, Zebra Books)
- Chrysalis 2 (1978, Zebra Books)
- Chrysalis 3 (1978, Zebra Books)
- Chrysalis 4 (1979, Zebra Books)
- Chrysalis 5 (1979, Zebra Books)
- Chrysalis 6 (1980, Zebra Books)
- Chrysalis 7 (1980, Zebra Books)
- Chrysalis 8 (1980, Doubleday)
- Chrysalis 9 (1981, Doubleday)
- Chrysalis 10 (1983, Doubleday)
