= David Harrow =

Multimedia artist

David Harrow was born on 29 June in London, England. He lives in Los Angeles and works as a record producer, DJ, and multimedia artist.

== Early life ==
In the early 80s, David Harrow performed as a keyboardist in art school, various squats in London, and the Warehouse Theatre in East Croydon. It was there that he met the poet Anne Clark after one of her performances. He wrote the music and produced tracks on her next album, Changing Places, and would continue to write and produce a number of influential songs that have since been considered milestones of that musical era.

== Career ==
In 1982, David Harrow wrote and produced his first solo album, The Succession. He soon began performing live with Psychic TV, a psychedelic/punk video art and music group. From then on, touring extensively in Europe, performing both as a solo artist and with Anne Clark as well. In 1983 he wrote and produced music for her album Joined Up Writing, and then relocated to Berlin, where he met his lifelong friend Mike Vamp of the Märtini Brös. Harrow produced Vamp's record Desperado, and followed that up in 1984 with another 12" of his own, called No Easy Targets.

In 1985 he released Sufferhead EP with British vocalist Peter Hope and Bite the Hand that Feeds You with singer Pinkie Maclure.

His remixes of Anne Clark's tracks "Sleeper in Metropolis" and "Our Darkness" were released in Germany, and Harrow started producing for German music groups LeningradSandwich and Fougorki.

After working for six months in San Francisco at the request of seminal dance label Razormaid, as in-house musician/co-producer for acts such as Debora and Sylvester, then relocating to Holland and began working with Jah Wobble Live and recording their album Without Judgement.

In 1987 it was back to London at the height of the acid house movement, and Harrow recorded his final album with Anne Clark, Hopeless Cases. He began performing with "Rubber" Ron Elliston from Black Britain at acid house events around the UK, including the Shoom at London Bridge and Oranges at the Astoria.

The following year, Harrow started working with On-U as one of the many groups signed to the label, and began touring as On-U Soundsystem along with Barmy Army, African Headcharge, Strange Parcels, Dub Syndicate, Jesse Rae and vocalist Gary Clail. Harrow wrote recorded and co-produced tracks for artists such as Lee "Scratch" Perry, The Justice League Of Zion, Bim Sherman, Style Scott of Roots Radics, Carlton "Bubblers" Ogilvie of Undivided Roots and Mark Stewart, and performed worldwide with all of the above.

Harrow wrote and co-produced Clail's two big hits, "Human Nature" and "Who Pays the Piper", and in 1989 released Radio Morocco as PULSE8 on Nation Records. In 1990 Harrow remixed Depeche Mode’s "Enjoy the Silence" and Candi Staton’s "You Got the Love" to further critical acclaim.

In 1991, Harrow began working with Andrew Weatherall under the name Bloodsugar; the duo released both remixes (notably of The Orb’s "Toxygene") and original material on Audio Emissions/Sabres of Paradise and secretly under the name Deanne Day (D and A).

1992, as a producer for many artists: Caligula, Headless Chickens, ATR, Salmonella Dub

Soon Harrow was signed to Weatherall’s label Sabres of Paradise under the moniker Technova, where he released the epic 12" "Tantra," followed by the albums Tantric Steps and Transcience. That same year (1993), he performed a legendary party at the London club Blood Sugar, complete with naked dancers, fire eaters and body modification artists. Harrow also found time to collaborate with performance artist Ron Athey and throughout 1994 was still touring widely with On-U Soundsystem.

In 1995, Harrow wrote Billie Ray Martin's worldwide hit, "Your Loving Arms", and began secretly working under the names "James Hardway" and "Magnetic". The following year, he released the first record as "James Hardway", Wider Deeper Smoother Shit, and began touring nonstop as "James Hardway", which he would continue to do for the next four years.

In 1997 Harrow signed to U.S. label Shadow Records as Magnetic, and in 1998 he released Hardway albums Welcome to the Neon Lounge on Hydrogen Dukebox and Easy Is a Four Letter Word on Shadow Records. The album "A Positive Sweat" followed on label Recordings of Substance in 1999.

In 2000, Harrow relocated to Havana, Cuba and Kingston, Jamaica to begin work on the album Moors and Christians (Hydrogen Dukebox). A departure from the jazzy drum and bass of his previous release, this new endeavor saw Harrow recording Santerían priests calling the Orishas to life as well as legendary vocalists such as Congo Ashanti Roy.

In 2001, after the death of his close friend Bim Sherman, Harrow headed back to the West Coast of the United States, this time landing in Los Angeles. He soon released Straight from the Fridge as James Hardway, and began building a brand new studio for his new label Workhouse. In 2003 Harrow began scoring music for television and film, including Las Vegas, Sex Lives in LA and The Loaner, and in 2005 Harrow signed to Lunaticworks and released Over Easy as the James Hardway Collective.

In 2006, Harrow established the online label "Workhouse Digital", initially to release his back catalogue. Workhouse soon became a showcase for his new recordings and fresh collaborations.

Still in demand as a collaborator, in 2007 Harrow produced Salmonella Dub's album Heal Me for Virgin Records. Harrow and rapper Lord Zen from LA crew The Visionaries worked together to become LVX Collective; the duo released 50.50.10 on Pressure Sound Records later that year. Turning the other direction, Harrow released Frozen Poetry, an ambient experimental work released under the name "Numb and Number".

In 2008, he released LA Instrumental as "James Hardway" on Ubiquity Records, followed by Wolf in the Machine on his own Workhouse label with Mirai Kawashima in a collaboration known as Kotodama Network. The following year, Harrow released the second LVX Collective album, LVXDeluxe, as well as the last "James Hardway" album Snake Eyes (Workhouse).

After his visual projection work at a UCLA’s Summer Nights at Hammer Museum party lead to a large crowd response, Harrow began branching further into multimedia work and the realm of video mapping. OICHO.tv was born, a form of spatial media, video mapping projects mutating images, shining hallucinations and bold displays of colour for a multidimensional experience of digital art. Not only a moniker for the visual realm, Harrow has also released several albums and EPs as Oicho.

2010 Harrow really began to revisit his early analogue Electronic roots. with a return to modular electronic music construction at his WORKHOUSE studio in East Los Angeles. Performing live beat heavy modular Dub sets at the now defunct Low End Theory as well as more improvised ambient settings outside by the LA river for modular-on-the-spot collective. More recent performances include a modular electronic version of Terry Reilly's in the human resource centre/UCLA accompanying Ron Athey at the Hammer Museum, and live ambient music and theremin at the Broad Museum

In 2015 he started Teaching electronic music production and sound design at Point Blanks LA music school and continuing to perform, produce and release music, via Bandcamp and his own label Workhousedigital.

Harrow studied for three years at Middlesex, University of London and graduated in 2020 with a first-class BA honours degree in Music production.

== Discography ==
[As DAVID HARROW]

ALBUMS:

- The Succession (Himalaya) 1983
- Technova (Addiction Records) 1994
- A Darker Frame (Workhouse) 2014

SINGLES/EP:

- Our Little Girl (Red Flame) 1983
- No Easy Targets (Ink Records) 1984
- Sleeper in Metropolis (with Anne Clark) (Ink Records) 1985
- Sufferhead EP (with Peter Hope) (Ink Records) 1985
- Bite the Hand that Feeds You (with Pinkie Maclure) (Ink Records) 1985

[With Anne Clark]

- Changing Places (Red Flame) 1984
- Joined Up & Writing (Red Flame) 1984
- Sleeper in Metropolis (Ink Records) 1984
- Our Darkness (Red Flame) 1985
- Pressure Points (Red Flame & Virgin) 1985
- Wallies (10 Records) 1985
- Sleeper in Metropolis (Ink Records) 1987
- Wallies (Ink Records) 1988
- Hope Road (Ink Records) 1991

[As JAMES HARDWAY]

ALBUMS:

- Deeper, Wider, Smoother Shit (Recordings of Substance) 1996
- Welcome to the Neon Lounge (Recordings of Substance) 1997
- Welcome to the Neon Lounge / All You Can Eat (Recordings of Substance) 1997
- Reshuffle and Spin Again (Recordings of Substance) 1998
- Easy is a Four Letter Word (Shadow Records) 1998
- A Positive Sweat (Recordings of Substance) 1999
- Moors + Christians (Hydrogen Dukebox) 2000
- Straight From the Fridge (Hydrogen Dukebox) 2001
- Big Casino (Hydrogen Dukebox) 2003
- L.A. Instrumental (Ubiquity) 2008
- Snake Eyes (Workhouse) 2009

SINGLES/EP:

- Cool Jazz Motherfucker EP (Recordings of Substance) 1996
- Bastard Son of Swing (Recordings of Substance) 1996
- Theo Steps In (Recordings of Substance) 1997
- Illustrated Man (Recordings of Substance) 1997
- Grow / Sleep Tonight (Recordings of Substance) 1998
- Grow The Remixes (StreetBeat Records) 1999
- Go On - Single (Recordings of Substance) 1999
- Choco Blanco (Hydrogen Dukebox) 2000
- Movin’ On (Hydrogen Dukebox) 2000
- Pranksters Present: Infused 12 (w/Ian O’Brien) (Hydrogen Dukebox) 2001
- Speak Softly (Hydrogen Dukebox) 2002
- Feel in Love (Hydrogen Dukebox) 2003

[As TECHNOVA]

ALBUMS:

- Tantric Steps (Sabres of Paradise) 1994
- Transcience (Sabres of Paradise) 1995
- Dirty Secrets (Hydrogen Dukebox) 2002
- Electrosexual (Hydrogen Dukebox) 2004

SINGLES:

- Tantra (Sabres of Paradise) 1994
- Transcience Remixes (Emissions Audio Output) 1995
- Boxinglove (Hydrogen Dukebox) 2002
- I Could Have Sex (Hydrogen Dukebox) 2004
- Sing and Play Joy Division (with A1 People) (Hydrogen Dukebox) 2004
- Prozak (Workhouse) 2009

[As MAGNETIC]

ALBUMS:

- A La Magnetica (Recordings of Substance) 1998
- Fastlife (Shadow Records) 2000
- Lo Culture (Shadow Records) 2002

SINGLES:

- Bull Roaring / Cheap Detective (Recordings of Substance) 1998

[As HIGH STEPPER]

SINGLE:

- Liebeziet / Step Up (Save the Vinyl) 1996

[As OICHO]

ALBUMS:

- Universal Hum (Workhouse) 2009
- Downtime (Workhouse) 2010
- Scent (Workhouse) 2011

EP:

- Oicho (Workhouse) 2009
- Yeah What (Workhouse) 2010

REMIXES:

- The Crackdown (Billie Rae Martin) - Oicho Remix (Disco Activisto) 2010
