= Chrysalis (sculpture) =

Public sculpture in Wisconsin, U.S.

- Artist: Beth Sahagian
- Year: October 1990
- Dimensions: 75 cm × 30 cm × 22 cm (30 in × 12 in × 8.7 in)
- Location: Wauwatosa; 39°52′41″N 86°8′42″W
- Owner: Chrysalis was commissioned by the Charles and Margaret Lescrenier family for the Girl Scouts headquarters at the entrance of the Marion Chester Read

Chrysalis is a public artwork by American artist Beth Sahagian located at the entrance of the Marion Chester Read Center, which is near Wauwatosa, Wisconsin, United States. The sculpture is carved from 2,500 pounds of Indiana limestone and bronze. It consists of one solid form and measures about 75" x 36". Chrysalis was installed in the entrance of the Marion Chester Read Center in October 1990.

== Description ==
Chrysalis was commissioned by the Charles and Margaret Lescrenier family for the Girl Scouts headquarters at the entrance of the Marion Chester Read Center. The artwork is an abstract, organic shape carved out of 2,500 pounds of Indiana limestone and bronze. The stone has a linear texture carved into it and the bronze tendrils are done by the lost-wax process and bonded to the stone. The base of the sculpture is made out of concrete.

== Historical information ==
Chrysalis is located in the entrance of the Marion Chester Read Center. Marion Chester Read pays tribute to the legacy of the Chester Read family, and more specifically, Marion, who continues to inspire others by her support of the Girl Scouting and the Girl Scouts of Wisconsin Southeast. 1921, Alice Chester, a community activist and philanthropist, became the first president of the local organization. She decided that the young women in Girl scouts needed a permanent summer camp. In turn, she bought a 125-acre site, which was later on given her name. 1987, a new headquarters building for the Girl Scouts of the Milwaukee Area was completed and is managed by descendants of Alice Chester. After the Center was completed, employees of Gammex Inc. offered support for a sculpture to be placed in the front of the building. Along with the patronage from the Charles and Margaret Lescrenier family, a $15,000 commission for a sculpture was offered. This is when Ms. Beth Sahagian learned of the commission and submitted drawings and a model to the patrons of the Girl Scout officials. Beth Sahagian chose to invoke a feeling of growth and change by creating an abstraction of a natural cocoon form. The materials she used, Indiana limestone and bronze, contrasted with the simplicity of the form. The linear texture carved into the sculpture gives variation and texture to the surface, and the bronze tendrils that are bonded to the stone are done so to give the artwork a feeling of growth and evolution. Chrysalis has a nearby plaque that reads: CHRYSALIS/A GIFT TO/GIRL SCOUTS OF MILWAUKEE AREA/FROM THE/CHARLES & MARGARET LESCRENIER FAMILY/ARTIST: BETH SAHAGIAN/(logo) 1990. She collaborated with other artists from the Hartbronze Inc. foundry to complete and transport the work to its location.

=== Acquisition ===
The work cost roughly $15,000 and was funded by the Charles and Margaret Lescrenier family.

== Artist ==
Beth Sahagian grew up as the daughter of a pattern maker and trained Milwaukee Institute of Art and Design from 1977 to 1981. She studied sculpture under Joe Mendla, the co-founder of Hartbronze Inc. In the 1980s, she did independent study at the University of Wisconsin–Milwaukee, and later on travel and sculpture study in museums and galleries in Europe. She is currently and has been for the past several years, an employee of Hartbronze where she developed her sculpture skills. In 1985, under the guidance of Paolo Grassi and Associates in Carrara, Italy, she created stone sculptures which cemented her resolve to make. Sahagian has other public sculptures in Wisconsin, Earth Flight (1988), at the north entrance of the Clinical Science Center at the University Hospital in Madison; and Current Mode I and II for Wisconsin Electric Power Company's downtown Milwaukee Annex. Sahagian has received numerous awards and participated in national and international exhibitions. She is also represented by a variety of regional galleries.
