= Higher State =

British record label

- Founded: 1992
- Founder: Marc Dillon & Patrick Dickins
- Distributor: http://www.loadmp3.co.uk
- Genre: House music
- Country of origin: UK
- Location: London
- Official website: http://www.higherstate.co.uk

Higher State is a dance record company and music publishing company founded in 1992 by house music producers and DJs Dillon & Dickins (Marc Dillon & Patrick Dickins) which incorporates the three record labels Higher State, 99 North and 99 Degrees.

== History ==
Initially, all the releases were composed by Dillon & Dickins under different aliases, e.g. Disco Biscuit, Sound Environment, Upstate, 99 Allstars & Illicit. The first release not written by Dillon & Dickins (although they did produce many of the mixes) was in November 1997 when they released Johnny X "Call on Me" (catalogue numbers 12HIMP4 & CDHSD34), which was written by Leee John (ex-singer and member of 1980s band Imagination). This was followed in April 1998 with Spacebase "What Am I Gonna Do" (catalogue number 12HSD35), which they co-wrote with the singer on the track, Kate Cameron.

The company then started licensing tracks from other companies, and had their first notable chart success in March 1999 with FPI Project's "Everybody (All Over the World)" (catalogue number CDNTH14), which on 13 March 1999 for one week reached number 67 on the UK Singles Chart.

Other notable releases include Matter's "Don't You Want Some More" (originally released in 1993 on Guerilla Records), M1's "Electronic Funk", 99 Allstars' "Chemical Generation" (which also featured the vocals of Kate Cameron as well as male vocalist Paul Alexander from American-based dance music group the Ones) and Dillon & Dickins' "Queers R Doin It".

== Discography ==
(All catalogue numbers are stated exactly as printed on the release – multiple catalogue numbers reflect all available formats.)

=== Higher State ===
Catalogue Number	Artist	Title	Release Date
HSD 001	Groovoid	Until U Drop EP	30 Mar 1992
HSD 2	Mesozoik	The Future EP	1 Jun 1992
HSD 3	Kartoid	Kartoid EP	29 Jun 1992
12 HSD 04	Dillon	"Make It Take It"	28 Sep 1992
12 HSD 05	Lafferty	"Brand New Day"	23 Nov 1992
12HSD6	Sound Environment	"Natural High"	11 Jan 1993
12 HSD 07	Crazy Prophylactic	"Reach"	15 Mar 1993
12 HSD 08	Disco Biscuit	"Disco Biscuit"	19 Apr 1993
12 HSD 09	Lentil Lovecake	"Don't Desert Me"	5 Jul 1993
12HSD10	Sound Environment	"Natural High (The Remixes)"	20 Sep 1993
12 HSD 11	Spacebase	"I Need You"	1 Nov 1993
12 HSD 12	NASA	"Secret"	15 Nov 1993
12 HSD 14	Sound Environment	"Feel So High"	29 Nov 1993
12 HSD 15	Disco Biscuit	"Disco Biscuit (Remixes)"	13 Dec 1993
12 HSD 16	Lafferty	"Thinkin 'bout"	24 Jan 1994
12 HSD 17	On the Blag	Working Jocks E.P. Vol. 1	7 Feb 1994
12 HSD 18	Spacebase	"Release"	21 Feb 1994
12 HSD 19	Swag Bag	The Money EP	14 Mar 1994
12 HSD 20	European Express	"Heaven"	28 Mar 1994
12 HSD 21	Roller Coaster	"My Geetar Hertz"	11 Apr 1994
12 HIMP 1	Cluedo	The White EP	31 May 1994
12 HSD 22	Sound Environment	Had Enough E.P.	13 Jun 1994
12 HSD 22R	Sound Environment	Had Enough E.P. (Rebound Remixes)	27 Jun 1994
12 HSD 23	Lentil Lovecake	"Let Me See"	11 Jul 1994
12 HSD 24	Various	"Higher State Sampler"	30 May 1995
12 HSD 25	Gorgeous Darlings	"I Want U"	26 Jun 1995
12 HIMP 3	Miss Stuck-Up	"Stick Together"	4 Sep 1995
12 HSD 26	Upstate	"I Get High"	2 Oct 1995
12 HIMP 4 / CD HIMP4	Johnny X	"Call on Me"	19 Feb 1996
12 HSD 27	Spacebase	"Patience / Frustration"	25 Mar 1996
12 HSD 28	Gorgeous Darlings	"Boy U Take Me / Alright / Angel"	15 Apr 1996
12 HSD 29	Crystal	"Bring Me Luv"	11 Jun 1996
12 HSD 30	Upstate	"I Get High (Remixes)"	8 Jul 1996
12 HSD 31 / CD HSD 31	Disco Biscuit	"Disco Biscuit (Remixes)"	21 Oct 1996
12 HSD 32 / CD HSD 32	Matter	"Don't U Want Some More"	12 May 1997
12 HSD 33 / CD HSD 33	Naka	"That's It"	30 Jun 1997
12 HSD 34 / 12 HSD 34R / CD HSD 34	Johnny X	"Call on Me (Remixes)"	24 Nov 1997
12 HSD 35 / CD HSD 35	Spacebase	"What Am I Gonna Do"	27 Apr 1998
12 HSD 36	Nature	"Trumpet Gun – Feelin Higher"	14 Jun 1999
12 HSD 37	Yosh Presents @-Large	"Do You Feel It"	26 Jul 1999
MP DND 009	Dillon & Dickins	"Digigen" (feat. Sonny)	2 Sep 2011
MP DND 010	Dillon & Dickins	"Nite Moves" (feat. Rose Windross)	2 Sep 2011
MP DND 011	Dillon & Dickins	Exquisite Illicit (album)	10 Feb 2012

=== 99 North ===
Catalogue Number	Artist	Title	Release Date
99 NTH 01	Various	"Taster"	31 Jul 1995
99 NTH 02	Sweet Peach	"Disco F*ck / Hard Suck"	18 Sep 1995
99 NTH 3	Doc Ximbi	"African American"	13 Nov 1995
99 NTH 04	Sweet Peach	Naked Fruit EP	4 Mar 1996
99 NTH 05	99 Allstars	Allstars EP	13 May 1996
99 NTH 6	99 Allstars	Allstars EP Vol. 2	30 Sep 1996
99 NTH 7 / CD NTH 7	DPD featuring Rose Windross	"Sign Your Name / Problem Child"	25 Nov 1996
99 NTH 8 / CDNTH08	Ninety Nine Allstars	"Luv Is All U Need"	9 Dec 1996
99 NTH 9 / CD NTH 09	Blackout	"Gotta Have Hope"	2 Jun 1997
99 NTH 10 / CD NTH 10	Gold Dust Twins	"Luver (All That I Wanted)"	20 Oct 1997
99 MCC 1 / CD MCC 1	Ninety Nine Allstars	Metal Can Collection (album)	8 Dec 1997
99 NTH 11 / CD NTH 11	Ninety Nine Allstars	"Soakin' Wet"	30 Mar 1998
99 NTH 12 / CD NTH 12	Ninety Nine Allstars	"Chemical Generation"	8 Jun 1998
99 NTH 13 / CD NTH 13	MURK	"Reach for Me"	14 Sep 1998
99 NTH 14 / CD NTH 14	FPI Project	"Everybody (All Over the World)"	1 Mar 1999
99 NTH 15 / CD NTH 15	Dillon & Dickins	Steers and Queers EP	31 May 1999
99 NTH 16 / 99 NTH 16R / CD NTH 16	Shawn Christopher	"Another Sleepless Night"	13 Sep 1999
99 NTH 17 / 99 NTH 17R / CD NTH 17	FPI Project	"Rich in Paradise / Going Back to My Roots"	29 Sep 1999
99 NTH 18	M1	"Electronic Funk"	24 Jan 2000
99 NTH 19	Illicit feat. Shannon	"Pulsation"	20 Nov 2000
99 NTH 20	Dillon & Dickins	"Stop the Groove"	11 Dec 2000
99 NTH 21	99 Allstars	"Space Sensation"	5 Feb 2001

=== 99 Degrees ===
Catalogue Number	Artist	Title	Release Date
99 DEG 1	T-Total	The Groovaholic EP	21 Jul 1997
99 DEG 2 / CD DEG 2	T-Total	The Dub Addict EP	2 Mar 1998
99 DEG 3 / CD DEG 3	Sweet Peach	"Take U Up"	1 Jun 1998
99 DEG 4 / CD DEG 4	T-Total feat. Paul Alexander	"Don'tchoowanna / Do It All Night"	10 Aug 1998
99 DEG 5 / CD DEG 5	Tallulah	"Gimmee Your Lovestick"	1 Sep 1998
99 DEG 6	Bounce	"Off Da Floor"	5 Oct 1998
99 DEG 7	T-Total	The Looprication EP	3 Mar 1999
99 DEG 8	Zero Zero	New Aegean Movement EP	19 Apr 1999
99 DEG 9	Orienta Rhythm	Orienta Rhythm EP	25 Oct 1999

== See also ==
- Lists of record labels
