= Chrysalis (boarding school) =

Therapeutic boarding school in Montana, United States

Location
- 77 Trails End Rd; Eureka, Lincoln, Montana 59917; United States; 48°56′54.64″N 115°7′39.88″W

Information
- Religious affiliation: Nonsectarian
- Established: 1998
- Status: open
- NCES School ID: A0902052

Chrysalis is a private, small therapeutic boarding school for girls between the ages of 13 and 18 years old. It is located in Eureka, Montana. Chrysalis was created in 1998 and now is a full member of the National Association of Therapeutic Schools and Programs (NATSAP).

The Chrysalis program is largely based on peer accountability, outdoor adventure therapy, and group therapy sessions they call "circles." The self-reported length of the program is between 18 and 24 months.

== Program ==
Chrysalis targets girls aged 13-18 who struggle with mental health issues such as post-traumatic stress disorder and social anxiety. The program includes year-round adventure therapy alongside EMDR and Brainspotting. Residents have class from Monday to Thursday.

== Controversies and legal issues ==
In 2024, Chrysalis was sued after a staff member allegedly sexually abused students. According to the suit, other staff members were aware of the sexual abuse and allowed it to continue. The school has also received allegations of emotional abuse and lack of medical care for injuries sustained from physical labor.
