= Inside Out (Odyssey song) =

Single by Odyssey

from the album Happy Together
- B-side: "Love's Alright"
- Released: 1982
- Length: 3:44, 6:20
- Label: RCA
- Songwriter: Jesse Rae
- Producer: Jimmy Douglass

Odyssey singles chronology
| "It Will Be Alright" (1981) | "Inside Out" (1982) | "Magic Touch" (1982) |

"Inside Out" is a 1982 song by the American group Odyssey from their fifth studio album Happy Together. It was the group's second highest charting single on the UK singles chart, where it peaked at number 3, and was also certified silver in the UK. It was ranked at number 15 among the "Tracks of the Year" for 1982 by NME.

== Track listings ==
=== 7" single ===
- A - "Inside Out" - 3:44
- B - "Love's Alright" - 3:50

=== 12" single ===
- A - "Inside Out" - 6:20
- B - "Love's Alright" - 3:56

== Charts ==
| Chart | Peak position |
|---|---|
| Ireland | 2 |
| Netherlands | 22 |
| UK | 3 |
| US Billboard Black Singles chart | 12 |
| US Billboard Dance/Disco Top 80 chart | 25 |
