= Datura (band) =

Italian electronic music group

- Origin: Bologna, Italy
- Genres: Techno, eurodance
- Years active: 1991–present
- Members: Ciro Pagano; Stefano Mazzavillani

Datura is an Italian techno group. It was created in 1991 by the musicians Ciro Pagano and Stefano Mazzavillani (ex-members of the 1980s-era Italian electropop group Gaznevada) and the DJs Ricci (Riccardo Testoni) who is now deceased, and Cirillo (Carlo Andrea Raggi), who continues to work in Italy, Ibiza, Morocco, and England. The first single was "Nu Style", in the summer of 1991, followed by "Yerba Del Diablo", a cover of Visage's "Fade to Grey", and "Eternity". With "Angeli Domini", in 1995, DJ Ricci left the group for other more independent projects. In 1997, their single "Voo-Doo Believe?" reached number 17 on Hot Dance Club Songs. The name "Datura" is taken from a hallucinogenic plant.

== Discography ==
=== Singles ===
Year	Single	Peak chart positions			Album
Year	Single	ITA	AUT	US Dance	Album
1991	"Nu Style"	—	—	—	Eternity
1992	"Yerba Del Diablo"	4	—	—	Eternity
1993	"Devotion"	7	—	—	Eternity
1993	"Eternity"	2	—	—	Eternity
1994	"The 7th Hallucination"	8	—	—	Eternity
1994	"Fade to Grey"	5	—	—	Eternity
1995	"Infinity"	2	—	—	Singles only
1995	"Mystic Motion"	4	—	—	Singles only
1996	"Angeli Domini"	5	—	—	Singles only
1996	"Mantra"	—	—	—	Singles only
1996	"Voo-Doo Believe?"	3	—	17	Singles only
1997	"The Sign"	2	—	—	Singles only
1998	"I Will Pray"	—	—	—	Singles only
1999	"I Love to Dance"	—	—	40	Singles only
2002	"Will Be One"	—	50	—	Singles only
2004	"Summer of Energy"	—	46	—	Singles only
