= Electribe 101 =

Background information
- Origin: England
- Genre: House
- Years active: 1988–1992
- Labels: Club; Mercury Records; Phonogram; Stahl 2; Electribal Records

Electribe 101 (stylised as electribe 101 on most record sleeves, Electribe – 1.0.1. on early releases) were an English-based group active from 1988 to 1992, playing dark, psychedelic, bluesy, electronic soulful house, and fronted by Billie Ray Martin.

== Musical career ==
Electribe 101 was formed in 1988 when four Birmingham based musicians and club owners (Joe Stevens, Les Fleming, Rob Cimarosti and Brian Nordhoff) who were searching for a singer to bring alive the music they'd been creating in their studio answered an ad in Melody Maker: "Soul rebel seeks musicians – genius only". The ad had been placed by the Hamburg born Billie Ray Martin, who had moved first to Berlin and then to London, in search of new collaborators. The five soon created "Talking with Myself", based on Julian Jonah's "Jealousy and Lies" and an original song by Martin. The group released "Talking with Myself" first as a white label on their own Hip-notic label, but it was soon picked up by Phonogram who released the single commercially in November 1988 on their 'Club' imprint.

The name of the group is a combination of various vague references. The first part refers to 'electric' and 'tribe', but is also inspired by a comic called Technotribe, and allegedly also based on a Soviet refrigerator named "Elektri 101", while the latter part can be connected to the Roland SH-101 synthesizer and Room 101 in George Orwell's Nineteen-Eighty Four.

Meanwhile, Martin had also sought out Mark Moore, who had had a hit with "Theme from S-Express" in mid-1988 and was busy putting together an album for S'Express. Billie recorded vocals for three tracks on the album. "Hey Music Lover", a loose interpretation of the Sly & The Family Stone track "I Want to Take You Higher" from 1971, was released as the third and final single from the album (Feb 1989). Based on its success and the buzz "Talking with Myself" had created, Electribe 101 caught the attention of manager Tom Watkins who got the group signed to Mercury label, also owned by Phonogram.

The group were now busy recording an album. The next single was intended to be "Lipstick on My Lover" (promo only, May 89), but plans changed when "Tell Me When the Fever Ended" emerged. "Fever" reached number 32 in the UK Singles Chart (Oct 1989). "Talking with Myself" was then reissued on Mercury, reaching No. 23 on the UK Singles Chart (Feb 1990) and No. 8 on the US Dance Chart, becoming the group's biggest hit. The album Electribal Memories was released in October 1990 and reached No. 26 on the UK Chart. Reviews were mainly positive. The last two singles released from the album, "You're Walking" (Sept 1990) and "Inside Out" (Odyssey cover, Nov 1990), also charted in the UK, No. 50 and No. 77.

Journalist David Stubbs summed up the group's sound aptly, calling it "lush and sobely entrancing, the very shadow of soul." Success was in the cards for the group when they got to support Depeche Mode on their 'World Violation Tour' in 1990, but it wasn't meant to be. Mode fans didn't always welcome the group, and occasionally the group was even booed off stage. Watkins found himself unable to manage a group that didn't follow his orders to the letter, and Mercury/Phonogram never figured out how to promote the group. Despite all the adversities, Electribe 101 recorded a follow-up album in 1991, but it was left unfinished when group was dropped by Phonogram, in the company's end-of-the-year 'cull' in 1991. The group tried to continue for a while, even recording more new tracks - but the group soon split. The men in the group continued as The Groove Corporation (which had already been used as their remix moniker on some Electribe singles and singles by Clive Griffin and Inner City), signing with the Network Records subsidiary label Six6, while Martin continued as a solo artist.

== Legacy ==
Belatedly it has become apparent that the music of Electribe 101 was ahead of its time. "Talking with Myself" became a balearic 'ambient' anthem in the late 1990s. On the strength of new remixes made in 1998 "Talking with Myself '98" charted again (UK No. 39). The album Electribal Memories has also been reissued a couple of times.

The tracks on the unreleased album also found new life. Many were re-recorded by Billie Ray Martin for her 1995/96 solo debut album Deadline for My Memories, while two songs ("Persuasion" and "Wishing You Well") had already been released on her 1993 singles. "Insatiable Love" was recycled by The Groove Corporation, as the title track on their 1993 album Co-operation.

In recent years, Martin has released exclusive Electribe 101 material. The group's promo videos were included on the 2008 DVD The Videos 89–98, along with two TV appearances. The John Peel Session CD released in 2011 includes the three tracks the group recorded live in October 1989 (broadcast the following month on Peel's Radio 1 show in the UK). In 2016 Martin released the original 8-track demo of "Talking with Myself" as a free download (currently unavailable) on her Bandcamp page. In 2021-22 Martin released physical Electribe 101 releases, first the Frankie Knuckles remixes of Electribe 101's "Heading for the Night", an unreleased single from late 1990 / early 1991, followed by Electribal Soul, the unreleased 1991/92 album. Electribal Memories was reissued for the first time on vinyl in 2024. The CD issue was vastly expanded, over 4 discs, including previously unreleased material supplied by Martin.

== Group members ==
- Billie Ray Martin
- Joe Stevens
- Les Fleming
- Roberto Cimarosti
- Brian Nordhoff

== Discography ==
=== Albums ===
Year	Album	Peak positions				Notes
Year	Album	UK	UK indie	UK Dance	SCO	Notes
1990	Electribal Memories (Mercury/PolyGram)	26	—	—	—	
1997	The Best of Electribe 101 featuring Billie Ray Martin	—	—	—	—	Budget reissue of Electribal Memories
1998	Electribal Memories (Mercury/Manifesto)	—	—	—	—	Midprice reissue with new remixes
2022	Electribal Soul	—	14	3	31	Unreleased album from 1991/92
2024	Electribal Memories (Demon/Edsel)	—	19	4	86	LP reissue / 4xCD expanded edition
2024	Demos and Rarities	—	—	—	—	EP of demos
2024	Electribal Selections	—	—	—	—	Compilation
"—" denotes release did not chart or was not released commercially

=== Singles ===
Year	Title	Peak positions				Notes
Year	Title	UK	UK Dance	IRE	US Dance	Notes
1988	"Talking with Myself" (Hip-notic Records)	—	—	—	—	White label 12"
1988	"Talking with Myself" (Club)	—	35	—	—	
1989	"Lipstick on My Lover / Diamond Dove"	—	—	—	—	Promo 12" only
1989	"Tell Me When the Fever Ended"	32	9	—	22	
1990	"Talking with Myself" (Mercury reissue)	23	4	26	8	
1990	"You're Walking"	50	—	—	—	
1990	"Inside Out"	77	—	—	—	
1998	"Talking with Myself '98" (Manifesto)	39	5	—	—	
2011	"The John Peel Session" (Stahl2)	—	—	—	—	Recorded live in October 1989
2021	"Heading for the Night" (Electribal Records)	17^{A}	—	—	—	Unreleased single from 1990/91
"—" denotes release did not chart or was not released commercially A) UK Vinyl Singles Chart
