= Mark Stewart discography =

- Studio albums: 7
- EPs: 1
- Compilation albums: 2
- Singles: 7

This article details the complete works of British vocalist Mark Stewart.

== As a solo artist ==
=== Studio albums ===
Title	Album details	UK Indie
Learning to Cope with Cowardice	Released: May 1983; Label: On-U Sound; Formats: LP	—
As the Veneer of Democracy Starts to Fade	Released: November 1985; Label: Mute; Formats: LP	3
Mark Stewart	Released: October 1987; Label: Mute; Formats: CD, CS, LP	5
Metatron	Released: April 1990; Label: Mute; Formats: CD, CS, LP	—
Control Data	Released: 18 June 1996; Label: Mute; Formats: CD, LP	—
Edit	Released: 28 March 2008; Label: Crippled Dick Hot Wax!; Formats: CD, LP	—
The Politics of Envy	Released: 26 March 2012; Label: Future Noise; Formats: CD, LP	—
VS	Released: 1 April 2022; Label: eMERGENCY heARTS; Formats: CDr	—
"—" denotes a recording that did not chart or was not released in that territory.

=== Extended plays ===
Title	Album details
Jerusalem	Released: October 1982; Label: On-U Sound; Formats: LP

=== Compilation albums ===
Title	Album details
Mark Stewart + Maffia	Released: 1986; Label: Upside; Formats: LP
Kiss the Future	Released: 30 May 2005; Label: Soul Jazz; Formats: CD, LP

=== Remix albums ===
Exorcism of Envy	Released: 3 December 2012; Label: Future Noise; Formats: CD, 2xLP+CD

=== Singles ===
Title	Year	UK Indie	Album
"Hypnotized"	1985	9	As the Veneer of Democracy Starts to Fade
"This Is Stranger Than Love"	1987	7	Mark Stewart
"Hysteria"	1990	—	Metatron
"Dream Kitchen"	1996	—	Control Data
"Consumed"	1998	—	Control Data
"Autonomia"	2012	—	The Politics of Envy
"Stereotype"	2012	—	The Politics of Envy
"—" denotes a recording that did not chart or was not released in that territory.

== With The Pop Group ==
=== Studio albums ===
Title	Album details	UK Indie
Y	Released: 20 April 1979 (UK); Label: Radar; Formats: LP	—
For How Much Longer Do We Tolerate Mass Murder?	Released: 21 March 1980 (UK); Label: Rough Trade, Y; Formats: LP	1
Citizen Zombie	Released: 23 February 2015 (UK); Label: Freaks R Us; Formats: CD, LP, Digital Download	—
Honeymoon on Mars	Released: 28 October 2016 (UK); Label: Freaks R Us; Formats: CD, DL, LP	—
"—" denotes a recording that did not chart or was not released in that territory.

=== Live albums ===
Title	Album details
Idealists in Distress From Bristol	Released: 14 July 2007 (JP); Label: Vinyl Japan; Formats: CD
The Boys Whose Head Exploded	Released: 27 May 2016 (UK); Label: Freaks R Us; Formats: CD, LP

=== Compilation albums ===
Title	Album details	UK Indie
We Are Time	Released: 13 June 1980 (UK); Label: Radar; Formats: LP	4
We Are All Prostitutes	Released: April 1998 (UK); Label: Radar; Formats: CD, LP	—
Cabinet of Curiosities	Released: 21 October 2014 (UK); Label: Freaks R Us; Formats: CD, LP	—
"—" denotes a recording that did not chart or was not released in that territory.

=== Singles ===
Title	Year	UK Indie	Album
"She Is Beyond Good and Evil"	1979	—	Non-album singles
"We Are All Prostitutes"	1979	8	Non-album singles
"Where There's a Will There's a Way"	1980	2	Non-album singles
"—" denotes a recording that did not chart or was not released in that territory.

=== Music videos ===
List of music videos, showing year released and directors
Title	Year	Director(s)
"She Is Beyond Good and Evil"	1979	—
"We Are All Prostitutes"	1979	—
"The Boys From Brazil"	1979	—
"Where There's a Will There's a Way"	2014	Rupert Goldsworthy
