= The Pop Group discography =

- Studio albums: 4
- Live albums: 2
- Compilation albums: 2
- Singles: 6
- Music videos: 4

The discography of English post-punk band The Pop Group consists of four studio albums, two live albums, three compilation albums, six singles and four music videos.

== Albums ==
=== Studio albums ===
Title	Album details	UK Indie
Y	Released: 20 April 1979 (UK); Label: Radar; Formats: LP	—
For How Much Longer Do We Tolerate Mass Murder?	Released: 21 March 1980 (UK); Label: Rough Trade, Y; Formats: LP	1
Citizen Zombie	Released: 23 February 2015 (UK); Label: Freaks R Us; Formats: CD, DL, LP	—
Honeymoon on Mars	Released: 28 October 2016; Label: Freaks R Us; Formats: CD, DL, LP	—
"—" denotes a recording that did not chart or was not released in that territory.

=== Live albums ===
Title	Album details
Idealists in Distress From Bristol	Released: 14 July 2007 (JP); Label: Vinyl Japan; Formats: CD
The Boys Whose Head Exploded	Released: 27 May 2016 (UK); Label: Freaks R Us; Formats: CD, DL, LP

=== Compilation albums ===
Title	Album details	UK Indie
We Are Time	Released: 13 June 1980 (UK); Label: Radar; Formats: LP	4
We Are All Prostitutes	Released: April 1998 (UK); Label: Radar; Formats: CD, LP	—
Cabinet of Curiosities	Released: 21 October 2014 (UK); Label: Freaks R Us; Formats: CD, DL, LP	—
"—" denotes a recording that did not chart or was not released in that territory.

== Singles ==
Title	Year	UK Indie	Album
"She Is Beyond Good and Evil"	1979	—	Non-album singles
"We Are All Prostitutes"	1979	8	Non-album singles
"Where There's a Will There's a Way"	1980	2	Non-album singles
"Citizen Zombie"	2015	—	Citizen Zombie
"Mad Truth"	2015	—	Citizen Zombie
"S.O.P.H.I.A."	2015	—	Citizen Zombie
"—" denotes a recording that did not chart or was not released in that territory.

== Music videos ==
List of music videos, showing year released and directors
Title	Year	Director(s)
"She Is Beyond Good and Evil"	1979	—
"We Are All Prostitutes"	1979	—
"The Boys From Brazil"	1979	—
"Where There's a Will There's a Way"	2014	Rupert Goldsworthy
