= Idealists in Distress From Bristol =

Live album by The Pop Group
- Released: 14 July 2007
- Recorded: 8 March 1979 –October 1980
- Length: 143:28
- Label: Vinyl Japan

The Pop Group chronology
We Are All Prostitutes (1998)	Idealists in Distress From Bristol (2007)	Cabinet of Curiosities (2014)

Idealists in Distress From Bristol is a live performance anthology album by English post-punk band The Pop Group, released in 2007.

== Track listing ==
Disc one
No.	Title	Length
1.	"Don't Sell Your Dreams"	3:42
2.	"She Is Beyond Good and Evil"	5:48
3.	"Don't Call Me Pain"	7:33
4.	"Snow Girl"	3:39
5.	"Don't Sell Your Dreams"	3:39
6.	"The Boys From Brazil"	4:55
7.	"We Are Time"	5:41
8.	"Thief of Fire"	1:36
9.	"Forces of Oppression"	2:17
10.	"Shake the Foundations"	3:26
11.	"Forces of Oppression"	2:24
12.	"Feed the Hungry"	4:08
13.	"Thief of Fire"	3:50
14.	"There Are No Spectators"	5:08
15.	"God Problems Communism"	2:47
16.	"For How Much Longer"	4:26
17.	"Justice"	3:44
18.	"We Are All Prostitutes"	4:40
19.	"Shake the Foundations"	3:40

Disc two
No.	Title	Length
1.	"Shake the Foundations"	1:47
2.	"Forces of Oppression"	3:21
3.	"Thief of Fire"	3:27
4.	"Feed the Hungry"	3:38
5.	"There Are No Spectators"	3:57
6.	"Crime of the Evening"	2:51
7.	"For How Much Longer"	4:10
8.	"Where There's a Will There's a Way"	4:47
9.	"Justice"	3:21
10.	"We Are All Prostitutes"	6:46
11.	"Shake the Foundations"	3:02
12.	"Liberty City"	9:50
13.	"Hotter Than 1000 Suns"	5:58
14.	"Feed the Hungry"	4:36
15.	"Entertain Your Life Away"	4:54

== Personnel ==
Adapted from the Idealists in Distress From Bristol liner notes.

- Dan Catsis – bass guitar
- Gareth Sager – saxophone, clarinet, piano, organ, guitar, mastering
- Bruce Smith – drums, percussion
- Mark Stewart – vocals
- Simon Underwood – bass guitar
- John Waddington – guitar, bass guitar

== Release history ==
Region	Date	Label	Format	Catalog
Japan	2007	Vinyl Japan	CD	JASKCD195
