= We Are All Prostitutes (album) =

Compilation album by The Pop Group
- Released: April 1998
- Recorded: 1979
- Genre: Post-punk, experimental rock
- Length: 35:53
- Label: Radar

The Pop Group chronology
We Are Time (1980)	We Are All Prostitutes (1998)	Idealists in Distress From Bristol (2007)

Professional ratings
Review scores
Source	Rating
Allmusic	4/5 stars

We Are All Prostitutes is a compilation album by English post-punk band The Pop Group, released in April 1998 by Radar Records. It comprises tracks from the band's second album, the compilation We Are Time and the singles We Are All Prostitutes and Where There's a Will There's a Way.

== Track listing ==
All tracks are written by Dan Catsis, Gareth Sager, Bruce Smith, Mark Stewart and John Waddington

No.	Title	Source	Length
1.	"We Are All Prostitutes"	from We Are All Prostitutes single	3:13
2.	"Blind Faith"	from For How Much Longer Do We Tolerate Mass Murder?	4:04
3.	"Justice"	from For How Much Longer Do We Tolerate Mass Murder?	3:09
4.	"Amnesty Report"	from We Are All Prostitutes single	3:14
5.	"Feed the Hungry"	from For How Much Longer Do We Tolerate Mass Murder?	4:16
6.	"Where There's a Will"	from In the Beginning There Was Rhythm / Where There's a Will... split single with The Slits	5:18
7.	"Forces of Oppression"	from For How Much Longer Do We Tolerate Mass Murder?	2:17
8.	"Spanish Inquisition"	from We Are Time	3:21
9.	"No Spectators"	from For How Much Longer Do We Tolerate Mass Murder?	4:19
10.	"(Amnesty Report II)"	from We Are Time	2:42

== Personnel ==
Adapted from the We Are All Prostitutes liner notes.

The Pop Group

- Dan Catsis – bass guitar
- Gareth Sager – guitar, saxophone
- Bruce Smith – drums, percussion
- Mark Stewart – vocals
- John Waddington – guitar

Technical personnel

- Dave Anderson – mixing, recording
- Dennis Bovell – mixing, recording
- Disc O'Dell – mixing, recording
- The Pop Group – mixing, recording

== Release history ==
Region	Date	Label	Format	Catalog
United States	1998	Radar	CD, LP	SCAN 31
