= No Thanks! The '70s Punk Rebellion =

Compilation album
- Released: October 28, 2003
- Genres: Punk rock, new wave, power pop, post-punk, proto-punk
- Label: Rhino
- Producer: Gary Stewart

Professional ratings
Review scores
Source	Rating
Allmusic	link
Blender	link
Pitchfork Media	10/10 February 10, 2004

No Thanks! The '70s Punk Rebellion is a compilation album chronicling the punk rock movement of the 1970s. Released by Rhino Entertainment on October 28, 2003, the box set of four compact discs includes 100 tracks originally released between 1973 and 1980, performed by 75 artists from the United States, United Kingdom, Australia, and Ireland. In addition to punk rock, the collection touches upon the antecedent style of proto-punk and the related genres of new wave music, power pop, and post-punk.

Many artists are represented multiple times in the collection. The Buzzcocks have the most tracks of any single artist, with three of their songs included in the compilation. Johnny Thunders appears on five tracks: two by the New York Dolls, two by The Heartbreakers, and his 1978 solo song "You Can't Put Your Arms Around a Memory". Notably absent from the compilation are the Sex Pistols, whose singer John Lydon refused Rhino Entertainment permission to include any of the band's tracks, allegedly because Rhino chose not to release the 2002 Sex Pistols boxed set in the United States.

== Track listing ==
Disc 1
No.	Title	Writer(s)	Artist	Length
1.	"Blitzkrieg Bop" (single version, 1976)	Tommy Ramone, Dee Dee Ramone	Ramones
2.	"White Riot" (single version, 1977)	Joe Strummer, Mick Jones	The Clash
3.	"Heart of the City" (from "So It Goes" single, 1976)	Nick Lowe	Nick Lowe
4.	"Boredom" (from Spiral Scratch, 1977)	Howard Devoto, Pete Shelley	Buzzcocks
5.	"(I'm) Stranded" (from (I'm) Stranded, 1977)	Ed Kuepper, Chris Bailey	The Saints
6.	"Neat Neat Neat" (from Damned Damned Damned, 1977)	Brian James	The Damned
7.	"In the City" (from In the City, 1977)	Paul Weller	The Jam
8.	"Final Solution" (1976 single)	Craig Bell, Tom Herman, Scott Krauss, Peter Laughner, Dave Taylor, David Thomas, Tim Wright	Pere Ubu
9.	"Roadrunner" (from The Modern Lovers, 1976)	Jonathan Richman	The Modern Lovers
10.	"Little Johnny Jewel" (1975 single)	Tom Verlaine	Television
11.	"One Chord Wonders" (1977 single)	T. V. Smith	The Adverts
12.	"Born to Lose" (from L.A.M.F., 1977)	Johnny Thunders	The Heartbreakers
13.	"Search and Destroy" (from Raw Power, 1973)	Iggy Pop, James Williamson	The Stooges
14.	"Let Me Dream If I Want To (Amphetamine Blues)" (from Live at CBGB's, 1976)	Willy DeVille	Mink DeVille
15.	"Oh Bondage Up Yours!" (1977 single)	Poly Styrene	X-Ray Spex
16.	"1 2 X U" (from Pink Flag, 1977)	Bruce Gilbert, Graham Lewis, Colin Newman, Robert Gotobed	Wire
17.	"Blank Generation" (from Blank Generation, 1977)	Richard Hell	Richard Hell and the Voidoids
18.	"(Get A) Grip (On Yourself)" (from Rattus Norvegicus, 1977)	Hugh Cornwell, Jean-Jacques Burnel, Dave Greenfield, Jet Black	The Stranglers
19.	"Cherry Bomb" (from The Runaways, 1976)	Joan Jett, Kim Fowley	The Runaways
20.	"Personality Crisis" (from New York Dolls, 1973)	David Johansen, Thunders	New York Dolls
21.	"Teenage Depression" (from Teenage Depression, 1976)	Dave Higgs	Eddie and the Hot Rods
22.	"Two Tub Man" (from Go Girl Crazy!, 1975)	Andy Shernoff	The Dictators
23.	"Hey Joe" (1974 single)	Billy Roberts, Patti Smith	Patti Smith
24.	"Your Generation" (1977 single)	Billy Idol, Tony James	Generation X

Disc 2
No.	Title	Writer(s)	Artist	Length
1.	"Lust for Life" (from Lust for Life, 1977)	Pop, David Bowie	Iggy Pop
2.	"Gary Gilmore's Eyes" (1977 single)	T. Smith	The Adverts
3.	"Sat'day Night in the City of the Dead" (from Ultravox!, 1977)	John Foxx	Ultravox
4.	"What Do I Get?" (1978 single)	Shelley	Buzzcocks
5.	"X Offender" (single version, 1976)	Gary Valentine, Debbie Harry	Blondie
6.	"Lookin' After No. 1" (from The Boomtown Rats, 1977)	Bob Geldof	The Boomtown Rats
7.	"Don't Dictate" (1977 single)	Gary Chaplin, Pauline Murray	Penetration
8.	"Bingo Master" (from Bingo-Master's Break-Out!, 1978)	Mark E. Smith, Una Baines	The Fall
9.	"Free Money" (from Horses, 1975)	P. Smith, Lenny Kaye	Patti Smith
10.	"The Modern World" (from This Is the Modern World, 1977)	Weller	The Jam
11.	"Chinese Rocks" (from L.A.M.F., 1977)	D. Ramone, Hell	The Heartbreakers
12.	"New Rose" (from Damned Damned Damned, 1977)	B. James	The Damned
13.	"Ambition" (1978 single)	Vic Godard	Subway Sect
14.	"See No Evil" (from Marquee Moon, 1977)	Verlaine	Television
15.	"Suspect Device" (single version, 1978)	Jake Burns, Gordon Ogilvie	Stiff Little Fingers
16.	"Mannequin" (from Pink Flag, 1977)	Gilbert, Lewis, Newman, Gotobed	Wire
17.	"Baby Baby" (from Pure Mania, 1977)	Knox	The Vibrators
18.	"Love Comes in Spurts" (from Blank Generation, 1977)	Hell	Richard Hell and the Voidoids
19.	"First Time" (from The Boys, 1977)	Honest John Plain	The Boys
20.	"Sonic Reducer" (from Young Loud and Snotty, 1977)	Stiv Bators, Johnny Blitz, Cheetah Chrome, Jeff Magnum, Thomas, Jimmy Zero	The Dead Boys
21.	"Shot by Both Sides" (from Real Life, 1978)	Devoto, Shelley	Magazine
22.	"Mystery Dance" (from My Aim Is True, 1977)	Elvis Costello	Elvis Costello
23.	"Trash" (from New York Dolls, 1973)	Johansen, Sylvain Sylvain	New York Dolls
24.	"The Day the World Turned Day-Glo" (single version, 1978)	Styrene	X-Ray Spex
25.	"Do Anything You Wanna Do" (from Life on the Line, 1977)	Graeme Douglas, Ed Hollis	Eddie and the Hot Rods

Disc 3
No.	Title	Writer(s)	Artist	Length
1.	"Ready Steady Go" (from Generation X, 1978)	Idol, T. James	Generation X
2.	"Teenage Kicks" (1978 single)	John O'Neill	The Undertones
3.	"Sex & Drugs & Rock & Roll" (1977 single)	Ian Dury, Chaz Jankel	Ian Dury
4.	"Ever Fallen in Love (With Someone You Shouldn't've)" (from Love Bites, 1978)	Shelley	Buzzcocks
5.	"Rocket U.S.A." (from Suicide, 1977)	Alan Vega, Martin Rev	Suicide
6.	"Mongoloid" (single version, 1977)	Gerald Casale	Devo
7.	"Homicide" (from Separates, 1978)	Nick Cash, Guy Days	999
8.	"Mr. Big" (from 198 Seconds of The Dils, 1977)	Chip Kinman, Tony Kinman	The Dils
9.	"Warsaw" (from An Ideal for Living, 1978)	Bernard Sumner, Peter Hook, Stephen Morris, Ian Curtis	Joy Division
10.	"Where Were You?" (1978 single)	Tom Greenhalgh, Jon Langford	The Mekons
11.	"Lexicon Devil" (from Lexicon Devil, 1978)	Darby Crash, Pat Smear	Germs
12.	"(My Baby Does) Good Sculptures" (single version, 1977)	Jo Callis	The Rezillos
13.	"The Wait" (from "Stop Your Sobbing" single, 1979)	Chrissie Hynde, Pete Farndon	The Pretenders
14.	"We Got the Neutron Bomb" (1978 single)	John Denney, Cliff Roman	The Weirdos
15.	"Pablo Picasso" (from The Modern Lovers, 1976)	Richman	The Modern Lovers
16.	"Action Time Vision" (from The Image Has Cracked, 1978)	Alex Fergusson, Mark Perry	Alternative TV
17.	"2-4-6-8 Motorway" (1977 single)	Tom Robinson	Tom Robinson Band
18.	"We Are the One" (from We Are the One, 1977)	Penelope Houston, Greg Ingraham, Danny O'Brien, James Calvin Wilsey	Avengers
19.	"Borstal Breakout" (1978 single)	Dave Parsons, Jimmy Pursey	Sham 69
20.	"Wasted" (from Nervous Breakdown, 1979)	Greg Ginn	Black Flag
21.	"Sheena Is a Punk Rocker" (single version, 1977)	Joey Ramone	Ramones
22.	"I Love Livin' in the City" (single version, 1978)	Lee Ving	Fear
23.	"She's So Modern" (from A Tonic for the Troops, 1978)	Geldof, Johnnie Fingers	The Boomtown Rats
24.	"Ghosts of Princes in Towers" (from Ghosts of Princes in Towers, 1978)	Glen Matlock, Steve New	Rich Kids
25.	"We're Desperate" (from "Adult Books" single, 1978)	John Doe, Exene Cervenka	X
26.	"You Drive Me Ape (You Big Gorilla)" (from The Incredible Shrinking Dickies, 1978)	Stan Lee, Chuck Wagon	The Dickies
27.	"Dancing the Night Away" (single version, 1977)	Nick Garvey, Andrew McMaster	The Motors

Disc 4
No.	Title	Writer(s)	Artist	Length
1.	"Hong Kong Garden" (1978 single)	Siouxsie Sioux, Steven Severin, John McKay, Kenny Morris	Siouxsie and the Banshees
2.	"Hanging on the Telephone" (originally performed by The Nerves; from Parallel Lines, 1978)	Jack Lee	Blondie
3.	"Top of the Pops" (single version, 1978)	Callis	The Rezillos
4.	"Adult Books" (1978 single)	Doe, Cervenka	X
5.	"The Sound of the Suburbs" (1979 single)	JC Carroll, Nicky Tesco	The Members
6.	"California über alles" (single version, 1979)	Jello Biafra, John Greenway	Dead Kennedys
7.	"Another Girl, Another Planet" (from The Only Ones, 1978)	Peter Perrett	The Only Ones
8.	"(I Want to Be An) Anglepoise Lamp" (1978 single)	Robyn Hitchcock	The Soft Boys
9.	"Radio Radio" (from This Year's Model, 1978)	Costello	Elvis Costello and The Attractions
10.	"Typical Girls" (from Cut, 1979)	Viv Albertine, Tessa Pollitt, Ari Up, Palmolive	The Slits
11.	"Human Fly" (1978 single)	Lux Interior, Poison Ivy	The Cramps
12.	"Psycho Killer" (from Talking Heads: 77, 1977)	David Byrne, Chris Frantz, Tina Weymouth	Talking Heads
13.	"Babylon's Burning" (from The Crack, 1979)	Paul Fox, Malcolm Owen, Dave Ruffy, John Jennings	The Ruts
14.	"If the Kids Are United" (1978 single)	Parsons, Pursey	Sham 69
15.	"Alternative Ulster" (from Inflammable Material, 1979)	Burns, Ogilvie	Stiff Little Fingers
16.	"Boys Don't Cry" (1979 single)	Robert Smith, Lol Tolhurst, Michael Dempsey	The Cure
17.	"She Is Beyond Good and Evil" (1979 single)	Gareth Sager, Bruce Smith, Mark Stewart, Simon Underwood, John Waddington	The Pop Group
18.	"Is She Really Going Out with Him?" (single version, 1978)	Joe Jackson	Joe Jackson
19.	"Get Over You" (1979 single)	O'Neill	The Undertones
20.	"Love Like Anthrax" (from "Damaged Goods" single, 1978)	Andy Gill, Jon King, Hugo Burnham, Dave Allen	Gang of Four
21.	"Peaches" (from Rattus Norvegicus, 1977)	Cornwell, Burnel	The Stranglers
22.	"Into the Valley" (from Scared to Dance, 1979)	Richard Jobson, Stuart Adamson	Skids
23.	"You Can't Put Your Arms Around a Memory" (single version, 1978)	Thunders	Johnny Thunders
24.	"Love Will Tear Us Apart" (1980 single)	Sumner, Hook, Morris, Curtis	Joy Division

== Credits ==
- Co-producer [Associate Producer] – Alec Palao
- Compilation Producer [Box Set Produced by] – Gary Stewart
- Liner Notes [Discographical Annotations] – Reggie Collins
- Management [Product] – Emily Cagan, Marc Salata
- Other [Licensing] – John Austin
- Producer [Sound Produced by] – Bill Inglot
- Remastered by – Bill Inglot, Dan Hersch, Dave Schultz
- Research [Editorial] – Steven Chean
- Research [Photo] – Steven P. Gorman
- Supervised by [Editorial Supervision] – Sheryl Farber
- Supervised by [Project Supervision] – Patrick Milligan
