= The Boys Whose Head Exploded =

Live album by The Pop Group
- Released: 27 May 2016
- Recorded: 1979–1980
- Genre: Post-punk, free jazz, experimental rock
- Length: 40:53
- Label: Freaks R Us

The Pop Group chronology
Citizen Zombie (2015)	The Boys Whose Head Exploded (2016)	Honeymoon on Mars (2016)

Professional ratings
Review scores
Source	Rating
Allmusic	3.5/5 stars

The Boys Whose Head Exploded is a rare live performances bootleg compilation by English post-punk band The Pop Group, released on 27 May 2016 through Freaks R Us. The recordings are taken largely from the band's 1980 tour of Europe and focuses on material from their sophomore album For How Much Longer Do We Tolerate Mass Murder?

== Track listing ==
All tracks are written by The Pop Group, except "Shake the Foundations" by Glaxo Babies

CD track listing
No.	Title	Recorded	Length
1.	"We Are All Prostitutes"	1980 in Milan, Italy	3:33
2.	"Justice"	1980 in Cologne, Germany	2:58
3.	"How Much Longer"	1980 in Cologne, Germany	3:55
4.	"Blind Faith"	1979 in Sheffield, England	5:40
5.	"Forces of Oppression"	1980 in Cologne, Germany	2:29
6.	"There Are No Spectators"	1980 in Cologne, Germany	3:16
7.	"Feed the Hungry"	1980 in Cologne, Germany	4:31
8.	"Rob a Bank"	1980 in Milan, Italy	2:17
9.	"Shake the Foundations" (Glaxo Babies cover)	1980 in Cologne, Germany	2:38
10.	"73 Shadow Street"	1980 at Helsinki, Finland	9:36

DVD track listing
No.	Title	Length
1.	"Shake the Foundations"
2.	"Feed the Hungry"
3.	"Thief of Fire"
4.	"There Are No Spectators"
5.	"If You Think You're Part of the Solution"
6.	"How Much Longer"

== Personnel ==
Adapted from The Boys Whose Head Exploded liner notes.

The Pop Group

- Dan Catsis – bass guitar
- Gareth Sager – saxophone, clarinet, piano, organ, guitar
- Bruce Smith – drums, percussion
- Mark Stewart – vocals
- John Waddington – guitar, bass guitar

== Release history ==
Region	Date	Label	Format	Catalog
United Kingdom	2016	Freaks R Us	CD	
Japan	2016	Victor	CD	VIZP-146
