= Cabinet of Curiosities (album) =

Compilation album by The Pop Group
- Released: 20 October 2014
- Recorded: 1978–1980
- Length: 41:47
- Label: Freaks R Us
- Producer: Tony Wilson

The Pop Group chronology
Idealists in Distress From Bristol (2007)	Cabinet of Curiosities (2014)	Citizen Zombie (2015)

Professional ratings
Review scores
Source	Rating
Allmusic	4/5 stars
Pitchfork Media	(6.9/10)
PopMatters	(7/10)

Cabinet of Curiosities is a compilation album by English post-punk band The Pop Group, released on 20 October 2014 through Freaks R Us.

== Track listing ==
No.	Title	Writer(s)	Recorded	Length
1.	"Where There's a Will There's a Way" (single version)	Catsis, Sager, Smith, Stewart, Waddington	1980 at Foel Studio, Powys	5:20
2.	"She Is Beyond Good and Evil" (previously unreleased version)	Sager, Smith, Stewart, Underwood, Waddington	1978 at Ramport Studios, South London	3:24
3.	"Colour Blind" (live)	Sager, Smith, Stewart, Underwood, Waddington	1978 in Brussels, Belgium	4:05
4.	"Words Disobey Me" (John Peel Session)	Sager, Smith, Stewart, Underwood, Waddington	10 August 1978 on John Peel's Show	3:36
5.	"Don't Sell Your Dreams" (live)	Sager, Smith, Stewart, Underwood, Waddington	1978 in Bristol, South West England	3:37
6.	"We Are Time" (John Peel Session)	Sager, Smith, Stewart, Underwood, Waddington	10 August 1978 on John Peel's Show	7:20
7.	"Abstract Heart" (live)	Sager, Smith, Stewart, Underwood, Waddington	1978 in Brussels, Belgium	5:11
8.	"Amnesty Report III" (alternate mix)	Catsis, Sager, Smith, Stewart, Waddington	1979 at Berry Street Studio, Central London	3:13
9.	"Karen's Car" (live)	Sager, Smith, Stewart, Waddington	1980 at Helsinki, Finland	6:01

== Personnel ==
The Pop Group

- Dan Catsis – bass guitar
- Gareth Sager – saxophone, clarinet, piano, organ, guitar, mastering
- Bruce Smith – drums, percussion
- Mark Stewart – vocals
- Simon Underwood – bass guitar
- John Waddington – guitar, bass guitar

Technical

- Bill Aitken – engineering
- Mike Coles – cover art
- Nick Watson – mastering
- Tony Wilson – producer

== Release history ==
Region	Date	Label	Format	Catalog
United Kingdom	2014	Freaks R Us	CD, DL, LP	Freak 2
