= Janine Rainforth =

English musician

- Origin: Somerset, England
- Genres: Post-punk; funk-punk; electro-ballad; avant-pop; electronica
- Occupation: Musician-singer-songwriter-producer
- Instruments: Vocals, keyboard
- Years active: 1979–1983, 2014–present
- Label: London Field Recordings
- Website: janinerainforth.com

Janine Rainforth is a singer-songwriter who co-founded original post-punk band Maximum Joy. She returned to performing her solo music in 2014 and also formed an offshoot of Maximum Joy MXMJoY in 2016.

== Biography ==
Rainforth was born in Somerset, UK. She co-founded original Bristol post punk band Maximum Joy when she was 18 years old. The band released 4 singles, the last produced by Dennis Bovell and an album on Y Records an album part produced by Adrian Sherwood in 1982. Her career in music at that time and with her band Maximum Joy was cut short by a serious violent sexual attack from within her close professional circle. She subsequently lost her performing nerve so eventually retreated from her music career. In 2014 Janine managed to overcome this and returned to performing her music in public and she released her first solo EP. In 2015 she spearheaded reforming Maximum Joy for Simple Things Bristol. The band carried on initially under the name of MXMJoY, they made a new album P.E.A.C.E. it was released in 2018 and released EP, Joy Again in 2022.

Her father is John Rainforth – who competed in the Italian winter Olympics.

== Career ==
Rainforth was original founder of Maximum Joy aged 18 years old along with the sax player of Glaxo Babies. They recruited ex-Glaxo Babies players and an ex Pop Group player joined them in the initial line up. The line up changed several times – a new bassist, percussionist and keyboard/ trumpet player joined them and eventually Rainforth left the band after a serious sexual assault upon her within her close musical professional circle gave her no choice but to do so. She then formed Leonard & The Cats a band with ex-members of the Cortinas and Pigbag – they recorded one single (which has not been formally released). Despite this she found she could no longer perform, and so eventually retreated from making music publicly until 2014 when she made a return as a solo artist under her surname, Rainforth.

In 2015 she spearheaded the reforming of Maximum Joy for a couple of concerts, including at Simple Things Bristol.

Rainforth and Maximum Joy drummer Charlie Llewellin started making an album straight after this and it was released in 2018. They also have played various gigs and festivals since – including Dimensions and the inaugural We Out Here festival.

== Works ==
- Stretch – Maximum Joy
- White and Green Place – Maximum Joy
- In the Air – Maximum Joy
- Man of Tribes – Maximum Joy
- Station MXJY – Maximum Joy
- Have Brave Heart – Rainforth
- Rumination of Us – Rainforth
- Beast – Rainforth
- Blood of Life – Rainforth
- Chimera – featuring Mark Stewart and Janine Rainforth – Textbeak
- P.E.A.C.E. – MXMJoY
- Soul Retrieval - Janine Rainforth
- This Is The Rain - Fateful Symmetry - Mark Stewart
