= We Are Time =

Compilation album by The Pop Group
- Released: 13 June 1980
- Recorded: 1978–1979
- Length: 37:45
- Label: Rough Trade, Y

The Pop Group chronology
For How Much Longer Do We Tolerate Mass Murder? (1980)	We Are Time (1980)	We Are All Prostitutes (1998)

Professional ratings
Review scores
Source	Rating
Allmusic	4/5 stars
Pitchfork Media	(7.5/10)
PopMatters	(8/10)

We Are Time is a compilation album by English post-punk band The Pop Group. It was released on 13 June 1980 through the record labels Rough Trade and Y.

== Track listing ==
All tracks are written by The Pop Group.

Side one
No.	Title	Recorded	Length
1.	"Trap" (demo)	1978	4:17
2.	"Thief of Fire" (live)	1979 at the Electric Ballroom, London	3:56
3.	"Genius or Lunatic" (live)	1978 in Brussels, Belgium	3:52
4.	"Colour Blind" (demo)	1978	4:06
5.	"Spanish Inquisition" (live)	1979	3:21

Side two
No.	Title	Recorded	Length
1.	"Kiss the Book"	1978, John Peel Session	2:47
2.	"Amnesty Report II"	1979 in Foel Studios, Powys	2:41
3.	"Springer"		1:09
4.	"Sense of Purpose" (demo)	1978	4:24
5.	"We Are Time" (live)	1979 in Glastonbury, Somerset	7:12

== Personnel ==
Adapted from the We Are Time liner notes.

The Pop Group

- Dan Catsis – bass guitar (A5, B2)
- Gareth Sager – saxophone, clarinet, piano, organ, guitar
- Bruce Smith – drums, percussion
- Mark Stewart – vocals
- Simon Underwood – bass guitar (A1–A4, B1, B3–B5)
- John Waddington – guitar

Additional musicians

- Mark Springer – piano and vocals (B3)

Technical

- George Peckham – mastering

== Charts ==
Chart (1980)	Peak position
UK Indie Chart	4

== Release history ==
Region	Date	Label	Format	Catalog
United Kingdom	1980	Rough Trade, Y	LP	ROUGH 12, Y 5
Finland	1980	Arletty	LP	ATTY 7
Japan	1982	Rough Trade	LP	RTL-17
Japan	1994	TDK Core Co. Ltd.	CD	TDCN-5154
Japan	1996	TDK Core Co. Ltd.	CD	TDCN-5576
