= Kiss the Future =

Compilation album by Mark Stewart
- Released: 30 May 2005
- Genre: Post-punk
- Length: 51:12
- Label: Soul Jazz

Mark Stewart chronology
Control Data (1996)	Kiss the Future (2005)	Edit (2008)

Professional ratings
Review scores
Source	Rating
AllMusic	3.5/5 stars
Pitchfork	7.5/10

Kiss the Future is a compilation album by British singer Mark Stewart, released on 30 May 2005 through Soul Jazz Records.

== Track listing ==
No.	Title	Original album (date)	Length
1.	"Radio Freedom"		2:14
2.	"Hypnotized"	As the Veneer of Democracy Starts to Fade (1985)	5:55
3.	"Beyond Good and Evil"		3:23
4.	"The Puppet Master"		2:37
5.	"Hysteria"	Metatron (1990)	6:12
6.	"Jerusalem"	Learning to Cope with Cowardice (1983)	3:45
7.	"We Are All Prostitutes"		3:12
8.	"High Ideals & Crazy Dreams"	Jerusalem (1982)	3:08
9.	"Liberty City"	Learning to Cope with Cowardice (1983)	5:34
10.	"Dream Kitchen"	Control Data (1996)	4:34
11.	"We Are Time"	Y (1979)	6:30
12.	"The Lunatics Are Taking Over the Asylum"		4:08

== Personnel ==
- Duncan Cowell – mastering
- Pete Reilly – mastering
- Mark Stewart – vocals
