= After All the Wishing... =

After All The Wishing…

Studio album by Jim Johnston
- Released: 2015
- Label: Rattlewatch Records

Jim Johnston chronology
Voyage of Oblivion (2012)	After All The Wishing… (2015)

After All The Wishing... is an album by Bristolian musician Jim Johnston. It was released in 2015 and features fellow Bristolian Mark Stewart from English band The Pop Group.
