= Maximum Joy =

English rock band

- Origin: Bristol, England
- Genres: Post-punk
- Years active: 1981–1983, 2015–present
- Labels: Y Records, 99 Records, Garage Records, Crippled Dick Hot Wax!
- Members: Janine Rainforth; Tony Wrafter; Charlie Llewellin; Marek Bero; James Byron
- Past members: Dan Catsis; John Waddington; Kev Evans; Jeremy Hirsch; Nellee Hooper; Peta
- Website: maximumjoy.org

Maximum Joy are an English post-punk band from Bristol, England, formed in 1981 and reunited in 2015.

Pitchfork compared their sound to "one of the Slits backed by the Gang of Four, while PopMatters said, "Musically, the group’s use of complex percussion, horns, danceable bass lines, and overtly English female vocals built a bridge between the worlds of Afrobeat, reggae, avant-garde jazz, funk and pop". Bandcamp state ‘Maximum Joy is pivotal to the history of post-punk…'

== History ==
Maximum Joy formed in 1981 by ex-Glaxo Babies member Tony Wrafter (saxophone, trumpet, flute) and Janine Rainforth (vocals, clarinet, violin). They recruited two other former Glaxo Babies members, Charlie Llewellin (drums) and Dan Catsis (bass), as well as ex-Pop Group member John Waddington (guitar).

The band's influences were later described by Wrafter as "jazz, reggae, funk and punk, soul, hip-hop (the Last Poets, Afrika Bambaataa and the Sugarhill Gang), dub and ambient. We weren't constrained by any single style but felt free to take what we wanted from it".

Maximum Joy released three singles on Y Records: "Stretch" (July 1981), "White and Green Place" (February 1982) and "In the Air" (July 1982). Kev Evans replaced Catsis after the first single. The 12" version of "Stretch" was also licensed for American release by the influential New York City label 99 Records.

In October 1982, the band released the Adrian Sherwood-produced album Station MXJY.

Jeremy Hirsch (trumpet, keyboards) then replaced Wrafter, and the band added Nellee Hooper (percussion, backing vocals). This lineup recorded Maximum Joy's last single, a Dennis Bovell-produced cover of Timmy Thomas' "Why Can't We Live Together" backed by "Man of Tribes". Rainforth was forced to leave the band before the single was released, and new vocalist Peta rerecorded the vocals on the A-side. It was issued in April 1983 by Garage Records, and the band split soon afterwards.

Retrospective Unlimited (1979-1983) was released in 2005, and Station MXJY was reissued on CD by Beat Records in Japan in April 2008, containing various mixes of the singles as bonus tracks as well as the unreleased version of "Why Can't We Live Together" with Rainforth's original vocal.

A compilation on vinyl of the band's singles between 1981-1982 "I Can't Stand It Here On Quiet Night" was released by a new label named after one of the band's tunes Silent Street Records - a collaboration between Blackest Ever Black and Idle Hands - in October 2017. It is the first vinyl reissue for the band in the UK.

The band's album, Station MXJY, was reissued in February 2020.

== Reunion ==
Rainforth reformed Maximum Joy in May 2015, inviting Llewellin and Wrafter to join her. On 19 August 2015, they announced that the reunited band would perform at the Simple Things music festival on 24 October 2015 in Bristol, joined by Marek Bero on bass and James Byron on guitar.

Following this Rainforth went on to form a new outfit MXMJoY, along with Charlie Llewllin and other new contributing members before releasing the first single, "Can Man Conquer It All", from their forthcoming album, p.e.a.c.e. The album was released on 22 February 2019 via Bandcamp on the London Fields Recordings label (Cat no: LDNFRD02).

== Other projects ==
Rainforth formed Leonard and the Cats with Ollie Moore (Pigbag) and Nick Sheppard (the Cortinas, the Clash), and now is performing and releasing music as a solo artist under the name of Rainforth.

Wrafter played flute on Tricky's 1995 album Maxinquaye.

Llewellin later played drums for Palace of Light, and served as a producer for Blue Aeroplanes. He moved to Texas in 1991 and was a founder member of Austin band The Gourds.

Catsis is the bassist for the reformed Pop Group.

Waddington went on to play with the Ammonites, Perfume and U-BahnX.

Hirsch released a solo single, "First Step", in 2006.

Hooper went on to fame as a producer for Massive Attack, Björk, Madonna, Gwen Stefani, Garbage and others. He has produced six Grammy Award-winning records for artists including Smashing Pumpkins, U2, Soul II Soul and Sinéad O'Connor, and won a BAFTA Award in 1998 for his work arranging the score and soundtrack for Baz Luhrmann's Romeo + Juliet.

== Personnel ==
Current members (of MXMJoY)

- Janine Rainforth – vocals, keyboards (1981-1983, 2015–present)
- Charlie Llewellin – percussion, keyboards (1981-1983, 2015–present)
- Marek Bero – bass (2015–present)
- James Byron – guitar (2015–present)
- Miroslav Haldina – drums, percussion (2015–present)

Former members of Maximum Joy

- Dan Catsis – bass (1981)
- John Waddington - guitar (1981-1983)
- Kev Evans - bass (1981-1983)
- Tony Wrafter - saxophone, flute, trumpet (1981, 2015)
- Jeremy Hirsch - trumpet, keyboards (1982-1983)
- Nellee Hooper - percussion, backing vocals (1982-1983)
- Peta – vocals (1983)

== Discography ==
=== Studio albums ===
- Station MXJY (1982, Y Records; reissue with bonus tracks - 2008, Beatink Records, Japan; reissue on vinyl by 1972 Records - Feb 2021)

=== Singles ===
- "Stretch" (1981, Y Records/99 Records)
- "White and Green Place" (1982, Y Records)
- "In the Air" (1982, Y Records)
- "Do It Today" (1982, Y Records)
- "Why Can't We Live Together" (1983, Garage Records)

=== Compilation albums ===
- Unlimited (1979-1983) (2005, Crippled Dick Hot Wax!)
- "I Can't Stand it Here on Quiet Nights" (2017, Silent Street Records)

== See also ==
- List of bands from Bristol
- Glaxo Babies
- Y Records
