= Honeymoon on Mars =

Studio album by The Pop Group
- Released: 28 October 2016
- Genre: Post-punk
- Length: 42:13
- Label: Freaks R Us
- Producer: Dennis Bovell, Hank Shocklee

The Pop Group chronology
The Boys Whose Head Exploded (2016)	Honeymoon on Mars (2016)

Professional ratings
Aggregate scores
Source	Rating
Metacritic	(64/100)
Review scores
Source	Rating
Allmusic	3.5/5 stars
Mojo	4/5 stars
PopMatters	(5/10)
Q	3/5 stars
Uncut	4/5 stars

Honeymoon on Mars is the fourth studio album by English post-punk band The Pop Group, released on 28 October 2016 by Freaks R Us. It is the band's second studio album since their reunion in 2010.

== Background ==
The Pop Group reunited in 2010 originally to tour, but eventually recorded and released their first new album in over 30 years, Citizen Zombie in 2015. The band released a live compilation entitled The Boys Whose Head Exploded in May, and in July announced they were back in the studio with producer Dennis Bovell, who produced their debut album Y in 1979. One month later the album was ready for preorder via PledgeMusic, and on August 31 they revealed the album title, artwork, and track listing in an interview with Fact Magazine. Singer Mark Stewart described the album as "a stand against manufactured hate" and "a hypersonic journey into a dystopian future full of alien encounters and sci-fi lullabies."

== Release ==
The album was released on October 28, 2016, and was preceded by the single "Zipperface."

== Track listing ==
No.	Title	Writer(s)	Length
1.	"Instant Halo"	Dan Catsis, Gareth Sager, Mark Stewart	4:27
2.	"City Of Eyes"	Dan Catsis, Gareth Sager, Bruce Smith, Mark Stewart	4:32
3.	"Michael 13"	Gareth Sager, Bruce Smith, Mark Stewart	3:58
4.	"War Inc."	Gareth Sager, Bruce Smith, Mark Stewart	4:33
5.	"Pure Ones"	Gareth Sager, Mark Stewart	4:26
6.	"Little Town"	Dan Catsis, Gareth Sager, Mark Stewart	3:54
7.	"Days Like These"	Dan Catsis, Gareth Sager, Mark Stewart	4:35
8.	"Zipperface"	Gareth Sager, Mark Stewart	4:18
9.	"Heaven?"	Gareth Sager, Mark Stewart	3:20
10.	"Burn Your Flag"	Gareth Sager, Mark Stewart	4:04

== Personnel ==
Adapted from the Honeymoon on Mars liner notes.

The Pop Group

- Dan Catsis – bass guitar
- Gareth Sager – guitar, saxophone, keyboards
- Bruce Smith – drums
- Mark Stewart – vocals

Technical

- Dennis Bovell – production (1, 3, 5–9), keyboards
- Dominic Lee – photography
- David McEwen – recording
- Kevin Metcalfe – mastering
- Hank Shocklee – production (2, 4, 10)
- Helen White – cover art
- Matt Wiggins – recording (5)

== Release history ==
Region	Date	Label	Format	Catalog
United Kingdom	2016	Freaks R Us	CD, LP	Freak 21
