= Jim Johnston (English musician) =

English musician

Jim Johnston is a musician from Bristol, England. Formerly one half of trip-hop band Monk & Canatella with Simon Russell in the 1990s. He now performs as a solo artist.

He released his debut solo album, Voyage of Oblivion in 2012. The album featured guest vocals from Australian folk singer Emily Barker. It was recorded live in a day with overdubs over the next four days. According to Johnston it encampusulates "vintage, classic rock and Indie sounds of the 60's, 70's, 80's and 90's". The album features such musicians as Martin Dupras on bass guitar, Chris Thomas on drums, and Owain Coleman on keyboards, with guitars and vocals provided by Johnston. The album was produced by Johnston and French Canadian producer Dupras. In December 2014, he performed in Bristol with producer Marc Collin in his new project, providing guest vocals on the Monk and Canatella track, "I Can Water My Plants"

In 2015, he released his second solo album, After All the Wishing…. This time featuring guest vocals from Bristol post-punk musician Mark Stewart from The Pop Group. The track "Count Your Coppers" featured on BBC Introducing, and also on the Tom Robinson mix tape on BBC 6 Music in February 2015.

In 2018, he released his third solo album Three-Dimensional Living.

In 2018 and 2020, he provided guitar for Damo Suzuki as one of his sound carriers when he played in Bristol.

== Discography ==
- Voyage of Oblivion (2012) Rattlewatch Records
- After All the Wishing… (2015) Rattlewatch Records
- Three-Dimensional Living (2018) Rattlewatch Records
