= Dr Heckle and Mr Jive (Pigbag album) =

Studio album by Pigbag
- Released: 1982
- Recorded: 1981
- Studios: Berry Street Studio, London
- Genres: Funk rock, jazz-funk
- Label: Y
- Producers: Dick O'Dell, Pigbag

Pigbag chronology
Dr Heckle and Mr Jive (1982)	Lend An Ear (1983)

Dr Heckle and Mr Jive is the debut album by English band Pigbag, released in 1982 by record label Y. It reached No. 18 on the UK national charts and No. 1 on the UK independent chart.

== Reception ==
Professional ratings
Review scores
Source	Rating
AllMusic	3/5 stars
Smash Hits	7/10
Trouser Press	unfavourable

Trouser Press described the band and the album as having "plenty of technical know-how and nothing to say."

== Track listing ==
Side one / Dr Heckle
No.	Title	Length
1.	"Getting Up"	3:20
2.	"Big Bag"	4:54
3.	"Dozo Don"	3:56
4.	"Brian The Snail"	6:27

Side two / Mr Jive
No.	Title	Length
1.	"Wiggling"	5:22
2.	"Brazil Nuts"	4:36
3.	"Orangutango"	8:45
4.	"As It Will Be"	4:17

2000, 1997 Bonus Tracks

"Whoops Goes My Body"
1. "Sunny Day" (12" Version)
2. "Another Orangutango" (Remix)
3. "Papa's Got a Brand New Pigbag" (7")

== Personnel ==
Pigbag

- James Johnstone - guitar, alto saxophone, percussion
- Simon Underwood - bass, cello, violin
- Roger Freeman - percussion, trombone, computer, keyboards, piano
- Ollie Moore - tenor saxophone, alto clarinet, sanza
- Chris Lee - trumpet, percussion
- Chip Carpenter - drums, percussion
