= Citizen Zombie =

Studio album by The Pop Group
- Released: 23 February 2015
- Recorded: 2012–2014
- Genre: Dance-punk; post-punk; art punk; experimental rock; avant-funk; noise rock
- Length: 39:53
- Label: Freaks R Us
- Producer: Paul Epworth

The Pop Group chronology
| Cabinet of Curiosities (2014) | Citizen Zombie (2015) | The Boys Whose Head Exploded (2016) |

Professional ratings
Aggregate scores
| Source | Rating |
|---|---|
| Metacritic | (74/100) |
Review scores
| Source | Rating |
| Allmusic | 4/5 stars |
| Drowned in Sound | (7/10) |
| Mojo | 4/5 stars |
| Pitchfork Media | (2.4/10) |
| PopMatters | (7/10) |
| Q | 4/5 stars |
| Uncut | 3.5/5 stars |

Citizen Zombie is the third studio album by The Pop Group, released on 23 February 2015 by Freaks R Us. It marks the first album of new studio material by the band since For How Much Longer Do We Tolerate Mass Murder?, released thirty-five years prior in 1980.

== Track listing ==
| No. | Title | Writer(s) | Length |
|---|---|---|---|
| 1. | "Citizen Zombie" | Gareth Sager, Bruce Smith, Mark Stewart | 3:52 |
| 2. | "Mad Truth" | Gareth Sager, Mark Stewart | 3:47 |
| 3. | "Nowhere Girl" | Gareth Sager, Mark Stewart | 3:26 |
| 4. | "Shadow Child" | Gareth Sager, Bruce Smith, Mark Stewart | 2:45 |
| 5. | "The Immaculate Deception" | Gareth Sager, Mark Stewart | 4:24 |
| 6. | "S.O.P.H.I.A." | Dan Catsis, Gareth Sager, Bruce Smith, Mark Stewart | 3:55 |
| 7. | "Box 9" | Dan Catsis, Gareth Sager, Bruce Smith, Mark Stewart | 3:37 |
| 8. | "Nations" | Gareth Sager, Mark Stewart | 3:11 |
| 9. | "St. Outrageous" | Gareth Sager, Mark Stewart | 3:44 |
| 10. | "Age of Miracles" | Gareth Sager, Mark Stewart | 4:11 |
| 11. | "Echelon" | Gareth Sager, Mark Stewart | 3:01 |

Versions Galore – Deluxe Edition bonus disc
| No. | Title | Length |
|---|---|---|
| 1. | "Zombie [Land]" | 3:05 |
| 2. | "The Immaculate" | 3:28 |
| 3. | "Shadow [Master]" | 2:45 |
| 4. | "Echelon [Instro-Mental]" | 3:01 |

== Personnel ==
The Pop Group

- Dan Catsis – bass guitar
- Gareth Sager – guitar, saxophone, keyboards
- Bruce Smith – drums, percussion
- Mark Stewart – vocals

Additional musicians

- Chiara Meattelli – backing vocals
- Skip McDonald – backing vocals
- Isla Rainforth – backing vocals
- Kate Rodd – backing vocals
- Pete Wareham – tenor saxophone

Technical

- Paul Epworth – production, guitar, backing vocals

== Release history ==
| Region | Date | Label | Format | Catalog |
|---|---|---|---|---|
| United Kingdom | 2015 | Freaks R Us | CD, LP | Freak 8/9 |
