= New Age Steppers =

UK post-punk and dub collective band

- Origin: United Kingdom
- Genres: Dub, post punk
- Years active: 1980–2012
- Label: On-U Sound
- Members: Adrian Sherwood; Mark Stewart
- Past members: Ari Up; Steve Beresford; Bruce Smith; George Oban; Viv Albertine; Vivien Goldman; John Waddington; Style Scott; Eskimo Fox; Jarrett Tomlinson; Kishi Yamamoto; Neneh Cherry; Keith Levene; Bim Sherman; Vicky Aspinall; Sean Oliver; Antonio Phillips AKA "Crucial" Tony; Dan Sheals; Stephen "Shooz" New; Errol Holt; Eric "Bingy Bunny" Lamont; Michael "Bami" Rose; Nick Plytas; Peter Stroud; Carlton "Bubblers" Ogilvie; Bonjo Iyabinghi Noah; Vin Gordon "Lizard" Logan

New Age Steppers were a dub collective from the United Kingdom, formed by producer Adrian Sherwood and featuring members of various prominent 1970s UK post-punk groups, including Ari Up and Viv Albertine of the Slits, Mark Stewart and Bruce Smith of The Pop Group, Keith Levene of Public Image Ltd and The Flowers of Romance, John Waddington and Sean Oliver of Rip Rig + Panic, and Vicky Aspinall of The Raincoats. Other musicians included associates of Sherwood's On-U Sound label, including Roots Radics' Errol Holt, George Oban (who had also played with Burning Spear and Aswad), Bim Sherman, Style Scott, and Eskimo Fox.

== History ==
New Age Steppers released the self-titled debut album on On-U Sound in 1980. It was followed by Action Battlefield in 1981. The third album, Foundation Steppers, was released in 1982.

Love Forever, an album of songs which the late Ari Up and Adrian Sherwood had recorded together until the death of Ari Up, was released in 2012.

On March 19, 2021, On-U Sound reissued the band's four studio albums and released a compilation of rarities titled Avant Gardening. The material was also issued together as a five-disc box set, Stepping Into a New Age, which compiles all of the group's recordings for the label.

== Style and influences ==
John Dougan of AllMusic said, "the sound of the New Age Steppers was that of cut-and-paste dub mixing, psychedelic swirls of found sounds, dissonant aural collages, sinewy reggae riddims, and odd, semi-tuneful vocals."

== Discography ==
=== Studio albums ===
- The New Age Steppers (1980)
- Action Battlefield (1981)
- Threat To Creation (collaboration with Creation Rebel) (1981)
- Foundation Steppers (1982)
- Love Forever (2012)

=== Compilation albums ===
- Crucial Ninety (1981)
- Massive Hits Vol. 1 (1994)
- Trifecta (2011)
- Stepping into a New Age Box Set (2021)

=== Singles ===
- "Fade Away" (1980)
- "My Love" (1981)
- "My Nerves (Punk)" (2012)
