= Monk & Canatella =

English indie/breakbeat musical group

- Origin: Bristol, England
- Genres: Indie; breakbeat; trip hop
- Years active: 1990s–2000s
- Labels: Cup of Tea Records; Telstar Records
- Members: Simon Russell; Jim Johnston

Monk & Canatella is an indie/breakbeat musical group from Bristol, England, formed by Simon Russell (born in 1973) and Jim Johnston (born 1975) in the mid-nineties. Their 1996 album on Cup of Tea Records, Care in the Community, is a prime example of the trip hop sound.

The band later moved to Telstar and released a second album, Do Community Service in 2000. The artwork for this album was an early collaboration with the Bristol born graffiti artist Banksy. The band parted company with the label shortly afterwards.

Their song "Trout" appears on the original soundtrack for the 1996 film The Island of Dr. Moreau, although the track is never heard in the actual film itself.

The band released the single "Straighthead" on YouTube on 23 December 2007.

The English trip hop band Portishead included a track titled "A Tribute to Monk and Canatella" on their 1994 CD single "Numb", a year before Monk & Canatella's first release.

Steve Haley also became the manager of Monk and Canatella, guiding them through a contentious deal with Telstar Records.

Albums:

- Care in the Community - Cup of Tea Records (1996)
- Do Community Service - Telstar Records (2000)

EPs and Singles:

- Fly Fishing EP - Cup of Tea Records (1995)
- I Can Water My Plants - Cup of Tea Records (1996)
- Who's Who EP - Cup of Tea Records (1997)
- Son 4.5.98 - Telstar Records (1998)
- Enter the Monk EP - Telstar Records (1999)
- Slagger - Telstar Records (2000)
