= Control Data (album) =

Studio album by Mark Stewart
- Released: 18 June 1996
- Genre: Post-punk
- Length: 58:46
- Label: Mute
- Producer: Adrian Sherwood, Mark Stewart

Mark Stewart chronology
Metatron (1990)	Control Data (1996)	Kiss the Future (2005)

Professional ratings
Review scores
Source	Rating
AllMusic	4/5 stars

Control Data is the fifth album by British singer Mark Stewart, released on 18 June 1996 through Mute Records.

== Track listing ==
All tracks are written by Mark Stewart and Simon Mundey, except "Scorpio" by Mark Stewart

No.	Title	Length
1.	"Dream Kitchen"	6:32
2.	"Forbidden Love"	6:14
3.	"Red Zone"	8:11
4.	"Scorpio"	8:10
5.	"Consumed"	4:30
6.	"Data Blast"	1:00
7.	"Digital Justice"	6:08
8.	"Simulacra"	4:26
9.	"The Half"	6:31
10.	"Blood Money 2"	7:11

== Personnel ==
Musicians

- Skip McDonald – guitar
- Doug Wimbish – bass guitar
- Mark Stewart – vocals, production
- Simon Mundey – instruments

with:

- Lincoln "Style" Scott – drums on "Scorpio"
- Jerry Tremaine – harmonica on "Scorpio"

Technical

- Tony Brown – engineering
- Anna Hurle – design
- Kevin Metcalfe – mastering
- Andy Montgomery – engineering
- Jill Mumford – design
- Adrian Sherwood – production
