= In the Beginning There Was Rhythm / Where There's a Will... =

Single by the Slits / the Pop Group
- Released: 7 March 1980
- Genre: Post-punk; experimental rock
- Length: 10:49
- Label: Rough Trade; Y
- Producers: Dave Anderson; Dennis Bovell; The Pop Group; The Slits

The Slits singles chronology
"Typical Girls" (1979)	"In the Beginning There Was Rhythm / Where There's a Will..." (1980)	"Man Next Door" (1980)

The Pop Group singles chronology
"We Are All Prostitutes" (1979)	"Where There's a Will There's a Way" (1980)

"In the Beginning There Was Rhythm / Where There's a Will..." is a split-single by English post-punk artists the Pop Group and the Slits. It was released on 7 March 1980 through Rough Trade Records and Y Records.

== Formats and track listing ==
UK 7-inch single (Y1, RT 039A)

1. The Slits: "In the Beginning There Was Rhythm" – 5:38
2. The Pop Group: "Where There's a Will There's a Way" – 5:11

== Personnel ==
=== Side A ===
The Slits

- Viv Albertine – guitar
- Ari Up – vocals
- Budgie – drums
- Tessa Pollitt – bass guitar

Technical personnel

- Dennis Bovell – production
- Adam Kidron – engineering
- The Slits – production

=== Side B ===
The Pop Group

- Dan Catsis – bass guitar
- Gareth Sager – guitar, saxophone
- Bruce Smith – drums, percussion
- Mark Stewart – vocals
- John Waddington – guitar

Technical personnel

- Dave Anderson – production
- The Pop Group – production

== Charts ==
Chart (1980)	Peak position
UK Indie Chart	2
