= The Politics of Envy =

Studio album by Mark Stewart
- Released: 27 March 2012
- Genre: Post-punk
- Length: 47:08
- Label: Future Noise
- Producer: Martin Glover, Mark Stewart

Mark Stewart chronology
Edit (2008)	The Politics of Envy (2012)	Exorcism of Envy (2012)

Professional ratings
Aggregate scores
Source	Rating
Metacritic	(71/100)
Review scores
Source	Rating
AllMusic	(unrated)
Mojo	4/5 stars
Uncut	4/5 stars

The Politics of Envy is the eighth studio album by British singer Mark Stewart, released on 26 March 2012 through Future Noise.

== Track listing ==
No.	Title	Writer(s)	Length
1.	"Vanity Kills"	Kenneth Anger, Brian Butler, Joe McGann, Mark Stewart	3:44
2.	"Autonomia"	Bobby Gillespie, Andrew Innes, Mark Stewart	3:35
3.	"Gang War"	Mark Stewart	6:07
4.	"Codex"	Martin Glover, Mark Stewart	3:33
5.	"Want"	Martin Glover, Mark Stewart	4:29
6.	"Gustav Says"	Mark Stewart	3:05
7.	"Baby Bourgeois"	Martin Glover, Mark Stewart	5:10
8.	"Method to the Madness"	Will Calhoun, Milan Cimfe, Corey Glover, Vernon Reid, Mark Stewart, Doug Wimbish	3:54
9.	"Apocalypse Hotel"	Daddy G, Little Roy, Mark Stewart	4:02
10.	"Letter to Hermione"	David Bowie	3:49
11.	"Stereotype"	Martin Glover, Keith Levene, Mark Stewart, Nik Void	5:43

== Personnel ==
- Martin Glover – production, mixing
- Mark Stewart – vocals, production, mixing
