= Simon Underwood =

British bass guitarist

- Genres: Post-punk, experimental rock
- Occupation: Musician
- Instrument: Bass guitar
- Years active: 1977–present
- Labels: Radar, Y
- Formerly of: Instinct, Pigbag, The Pop Group

Simon Underwood is a British bass guitarist best known as a member of the bands the Pop Group and Pigbag. As described by punk rock producer Dennis Bovell, Underwood was "a wicked bass player... Together Simon and Bruce [Smith] were the Sly & Robbie of the punk period."

== Biography ==
Underwood joined the Pop Group in 1977. Underwood knew Mark Stewart and Bruce Smith because they would frequent black blues clubs together. This blues influence has been cited in many punk histories as contributing to the band's unique multigenre sound.

Underwood played on the Pop Group's first 7" single, featuring "She Is Beyond Good and Evil" b/w "3.38" and on the albums Y and We Are Time. He left the band shortly after the release of its first album and was asked to join Pigbag in 1980. As noted by The Quietus, after leaving the Pop Group, "Simon Underwood ended up having one of post-punk funk's biggest smash hits with 'Papa's Got a Brand New Pigbag'."

In 1983, he married bandmate Angela Jaeger at Hammersmith Registry Office. Lacklustre sales and critical reception of Pigbag's new work caused them to disband in June 1983. Underwood then formed the short-lived Instinct with Angela Jaeger and James Johnstone on ZTT Records.

As of 2015, Underwood is a member of the experimental noise ensemble Conspirators of Pleasure, along with Poulomi Desai. As a duo and as solo artists, they have performed many times live in the UK and Europe. In 2015, Underwood and Poulomi Desai joined the Waywords and Meansigns project, a collaborative project setting James Joyce's Finnegans Wake to music.

In 2017, Underwood released a cassette/download album with Poulomi Desai and Jonas Gustafsson under the musical art group Conspirators of Pleasure on the IMPEKA label titled The Usurp Tapes Vol. 1 - Species of Spaces - an exploration of the everyday surroundings, mundane activities and forgotten objects located at Usurp Art Space in West Harrow, London. The title and concept was a reference to the French writer and documentalist Georges Perec.

Upcoming projects in 2018 was a double CD release of electroacoustic / noise duets between Underwood and Jonas Gustafsson on the IMPEKA label titled Momentary Masters of a Fraction of a Dot.

== Discography ==
| Year | Artist | Album | Label |
|---|---|---|---|
| 1979 | The Pop Group | Y | Radar |
| 1980 | The Pop Group | We Are Time | Rough Trade, Y |
| 1981 | Pigbag | Dr Heckle and Mr Jive | Y |
| 1983 | Pigbag | Lend an Ear | Y |
