= We Are All Prostitutes =

Single by The Pop Group
- B-side: "Amnesty International Report on British Army Torture of Irish Prisoners"
- Released: 9 November 1979
- Genre: Post-punk; funk
- Length: 3:08
- Label: Rough Trade
- Songwriter(s): The Pop Group
- Producer(s): Dennis Bovell, The Pop Group

The Pop Group singles chronology
"She Is Beyond Good and Evil" (1979)	"We Are All Prostitutes" (1979)	"Where There's a Will There's a Way" (1980)

"We Are All Prostitutes" is a song by English post-punk band The Pop Group. It was released as the band's second single on 9 November 1979 through Rough Trade Records. The song is a critique of consumerism.

The song was included as the third track in the 2016 reissue of The Pop Group's 1980 album For How Much Longer Do We Tolerate Mass Murder?

== Reception ==
Songwriter Nick Cave declared the song to be the band's masterpiece, saying, "It had everything that I thought rock and roll should have. It was violent, paranoid music for a violent, paranoid time." Writer Mark Fisher described the song "scouring, seesawing, seasick funk, a pied piper’s exit from dominant reality, fired by a fissile compound of millenarian terror and militant jubilation."

=== Legacy ===
Publication	Country	Accolade	Year	Rank
Mojo	United Kingdom	100 Punk Scorchers	2001	33
Gary Mulholland	United Kingdom	This Is Uncool: The 500 Best Singles Since Punk Rock	2002	*
Mojo	United Kingdom	The Mojo 100 Greatest Protest Songs	2004	93
Q	United Kingdom	The Ultimate Music Collection (Punk)	2005	*

(*) designates unordered lists.

== Formats and track listing ==
All songs written by The Pop Group.

- UK 7" single (RT 023)
1. "We Are All Prostitutes" – 3:08
2. "Amnesty International Report on British Army Torture of Irish Prisoners" – 3:08

== Credits and personnel ==
The Pop Group

- Dan Catsis – bass guitar
- Gareth Sager – guitar, saxophone
- Bruce Smith – drums, percussion
- Mark Stewart – vocals
- John Waddington – guitar

Additional musicians

- Tristan Honsinger – cello (B-side)

Technical personnel

- Maxwell Anandappa – mastering
- Dennis Bovell – production
- Adam Kidron – engineering
- The Pop Group – production

== Charts ==
Chart (1980)	Peak position
UK Indie Chart	8
