= Pigbag =

British post-punk band

- Origin: Cheltenham, England
- Genres: Dance-punk, funk rock, post-punk, alternative dance
- Years active: 1980–1983
- Labels: Y, Rough Trade, Fire
- Past members: Simon Underwood; James Johnstone; Chris Lee; Ollie Moore; Roger Freeman; Chip Carpenter; Chris Hamlin; Mark Smith; Brian Nevill; Oscar Verden; Angela Jaeger

Pigbag were a British post-punk band, best known for their instrumentals, active between 1980 and 1983.

== Origin and formation ==
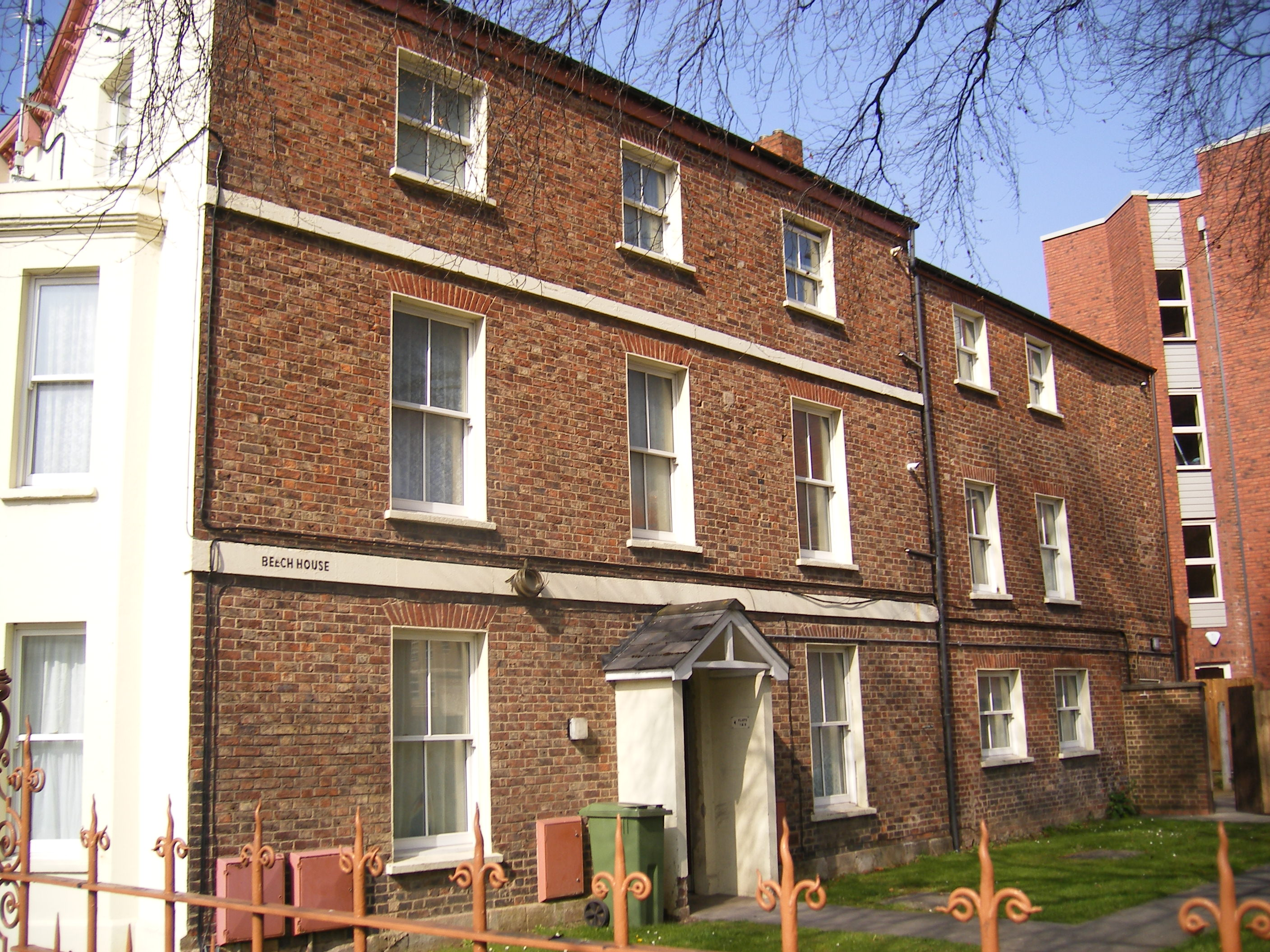
The Beech House was Pigbag's usual practice space.

Pigbag were formed in Cheltenham in late 1980 by Chris Hamlin, a fashion student at Cheltenham Art College. Hamlin recruited multi-instrumentalist Roger Freeman, an old friend from his hometown of Birmingham, along with Chris Lee on trumpet and James Johnstone, a guitarist, record shop assistant and newcomer to the alto sax, for initial jam sessions which would eventually evolve into Pigbag. The group would jam in parks and various other places, but their usual practice space was Hamlin's flat in Beech House, on the corner of St James's Square and St George's Place in Cheltenham.

After a couple of months they decided to expand the line-up, adding a rhythm section and rehearsing more seriously. They recruited Andrew "Chip" Carpenter on drums and Mark "Miff" Smith on bass, both old school friends of Johnstone's, and former members of their previous band Hardware. It was at these jam sessions that "Papa's Got a Brand New Pigbag" was developed from an idea Chris Hamlin and James Johnson had had before the band was formed. The song would become their signature tune.

When Hamlin heard that Simon Underwood had left The Pop Group he invited him to join the nascent band (to replace Mark Smith who had left by this point), the band then trading under the tentative name Us Corporation. Through a friend who knew Mark Stewart, The Pop Group's vocalist, Hamlin and Johnstone acquired Underwood's address and hitched down to Bristol to convince him, using tape recordings of their jam sessions. To their surprise Underwood agreed, also suggesting his friend Ollie Moore as tenor sax player.

Through Underwood's connections with Dick O'Dell, then manager of The Slits and head of Y Records, they landed their first gig, supporting The Slits at Romeo and Juliet's in Bristol on 21 October 1980. They played a twenty-minute version of what was to become "Papa's Got a Brand New Pigbag" to a positive reception, and the next day O'Dell invited them to record the track for Y Records. At this point they adopted the name Pigbag, in reference to Chris Hamlin's scruffy cloth bag bearing a screen-printed warthog.

== Early recordings ==
The band made their first recordings in 1981 at Berry Street Studios in London. Later that year they released their first single, the instrumental "Papa's Got A Brand New Pigbag", on Y Records, distributed by Rough Trade, the title being a pun on James Brown's "Papa's Got A Brand New Bag". The track became an underground dance hit. The song, and the remix "Reach Up (Papa's Got A Brand New Pigbag)" by Paul Oakenfold under the alias Perfecto Allstarz (which became a UK and Irish Top 10 hit in early 1995), has become a stadium anthem in English football (particularly in the Football League), originally adopted by Queens Park Rangers supporters in 1994 after some of their fans took it on as an anthem at a music venue in Westbourne Park, often played or chanted before a match or at half time, or after the scoring of a goal, and often incorporating the name of a player into the song.

Around this time Hamlin left the band, feeling that he had created an unmanageable group with too many egos to contend with, and that he was "losing control of the band". Soon afterwards he recorded a version of "Swinging on a Star" which was never released.

During September and October 1981, the band toured the US, playing in New York City, Philadelphia, Washington, D.C., Northampton, MA, San Francisco and Berkeley, California. They followed "Papa..." with "Sunny Day", a similarly brash, bright and funky track for which Ed Steinberg shot a video in New York. It became their first to chart on the UK Singles Chart, peaking at 53. They also recorded another single, "Getting Up", in early 1982 which peaked at 61. March 1982 saw the release of their first album Dr Heckle and Mr Jive, which reached the Top 20 of the UK album chart, and topped the UK Indie Chart for several weeks, despite including only one of their previous singles - "Getting Up".

The band embarked on a long and gruelling college tour in the spring of 1982, which placed them under considerable strain. Roger Freeman was replaced by Brian Nevill for several gigs. Club play and the extensive tour had stimulated demand for "Papa's Got a Brand New Pigbag", which was consequently re-released on Stiff Records, peaking at No. 3 in the UK Singles Chart and giving the band their only significant mainstream success.

The band made two appearances on Top of the Pops, on 8 and 22 April 1982. Brian Nevill sat in on both appearances, and Paul "Nellee" Hooper (later producer for Björk, Madonna and Soul II Soul) also appeared with the band, although he was never a band member and did not play on any of the Pigbag recordings. The first Top of the Pops appearance also coincided with Roger Freeman's departure from the band. Already stressed from touring, Freeman refused to switch his donkey jacket for the suits which the band had decided to all wear for the show, so departed from the band the day before the recording. He went on to record the 1986 non-stop forty-minute prototype chill-out / house album Designer Beatnik with ex-Duran Duran member Stephen Duffy under the name Dr Calculus mdma (the cover photo showing the "Spirit of Ecstasy" car mascot).

== Later career ==
On 27 April 1982, a new line-up, including Brian Nevill and Oscar Verden, started rehearsing. The band changed their sound slightly, following up with "The Big Bean", a slower track with a more Caribbean vibe, which peaked at No. 40 in the UK Singles Chart. The single was recorded at Abbey Road Studios on 5 and 6 June 1982. This was followed by a short UK tour, then a European one, and dates in New York on 9 and 10 July and in Japan from 18 to 31 July.

Soon afterwards Angela Jaeger, a New York jazz singer, joined the band. Jaeger had previously sung with a band called The Drowning Craze. The next LP, Lend An Ear, was recorded in the late summer of 1982, and the band appeared on the Christmas edition of Top of the Pops.

Underwood and Jaeger were married at Hammersmith Registry Office in 1983, attended by many notables from the music scene, including Johnny Rotten. During 1983, the band released a single, "Hit The 'O' Deck" (a reference to turntables), and the album recorded the previous year, Lend An Ear. The band toured the UK from 14 February to 13 March 1983. A European tour followed from 29 March to 16 April. Their last live gig was in Portsmouth on 28 April 1983.

Following a poor critical reception to the new direction and differences in the band, Pigbag split in June 1983, with Johnstone, Jaeger and Underwood forming Instinct. Y Records released two further albums, Pigbag (including seven live tracks and one remix), and Favourite Things (including all the singles plus a few other album tracks). The press accused Dick O'Dell of releasing the albums purely to buoy Y Records' finances, which were in trouble following the failure of most of their roster to make significant sales (with the possible exception of Shriekback, who instead fell out with O'Dell and left the label).

Kaz Records (part of Castle Communications) took over Y Records' operations when the label finally went bankrupt, and have subsequently released Discology: The Best of Pigbag on CD.

== Legacy ==
Although never hugely commercially successful, Pigbag had a distinctive sound. Members of the band went on to record with many other bands, some still active today. Their career took place during the huge mushrooming and cross-pollination of genres that followed the punk movement, and their music can be said to incorporate elements of punk, jazz, funk, ska, reggae and even tribal world music, such as afrobeat, all accompanied with undeniable pop sensibility. Pigbag's influence can be heard today in the more funk-influenced percussive side of the post-punk revival, in such bands as !!! and LCD Soundsystem.

Their single "Papa's Got a Brand New Pigbag" has entered mainstream consciousness, and is considered a classic pop hit of its era. It is removed somewhat from the rest of the band's career, to the effect that Pigbag are sometimes considered one-hit wonders. It has been used extensively as soundtrack music and at sporting events, particularly by Middlesbrough Football Club and Queens Park Rangers, and is still a popular dance record in clubs. In 2003, an anthem row erupted before a play-off final at the Millennium Stadium in Cardiff between Cardiff and Queens Park Rangers. Eventually neither "God Save the Queen" nor "Hen Wlad Fy Nhadau" were played and the clubs could choose their own song. Cardiff opted for "Men of Harlech", while QPR went for "Papa's Got A Brand New Pigbag".

The track was sampled in Alex Gaudino's song "Watch Out" and has been covered by several other artists. It featured on the soundtrack of the 2006 film of Alan Bennet's The History Boys. English group Madness have included a cover version of the song in their live set on occasion. In Canada, the song was used as the theme for The NewMusic, a music newsmagazine show for over 25 years. British gymnast Claudia Fragapane used a remix for her floor music between 2015 and 2016.

== Band members ==
=== Original line-up ===
- Simon Underwood – electric and acoustic bass
- James Johnstone – alto saxophone, guitar
- Chris Lee – trumpet, steel drums
- Ollie Moore – tenor and baritone saxophone
- Roger Freeman – trombone, keyboards, percussion
- Andy 'Chip' Carpenter – drums, percussion
- Chris Hamlin – clarinet, percussion
- Mark Smith – electric bass

=== Later additions ===
- Brian Nevill – drums, percussion, soprano saxophone
- Oscar Verden – trombone, keyboards
- Angela Jaeger – vocals

== Discography ==
=== Albums ===
Month	Year	Title	UK Indie Chart Position	UK Albums Chart
February	1982	Dr Heckle and Mr Jive	No. 1	No. 18
May	1983	Lend an Ear	No. 7	—
	1983	Pigbag	—	—
	1983	Favourite Things	—	—
	1987	Discology: The Best of Pigbag	—	—
	1998	BBC Sessions	—	—
	2000	Dr Heckle and Mr Jive (re-issue)	—	—
	2010	Volume 1 Dr Heckle and Mr Jive (re-issue)	—	—
	2010	Volume 2 Lend an Ear (re-issue)	—	—
March	2013	Year of the Pigbag	—	—

=== Singles ===
Month	Year	Title	UK Indie	UK
May	1981	"Papa's Got a Brand New Pigbag"	2	—
November	1981	"Sunny Day"	2	53
February	1982	"Getting Up"	2	61
March	1982	"Papa's Got a Brand New Pigbag" (re-issue)	1	3
July	1982	"The Big Bean"	3	40
April	1983	"Hit the 'O' Deck"	7	—
June	2010	"Papa's Got a Brand New Pigbag" (2 remixes)	—	—

=== Song appearances ===
- "Papa's Got a Brand New Pigbag" used as intro music to Toronto TV station City TV's The New Music from 1980 to c. 1983.
- "Papa's Got a Brand New Pigbag" used in The Ongoing History of New Music episode "Alt-Rock's Greatest Instrumentals" from 2003.
