= She Is Beyond Good and Evil =

Single by The Pop Group
- B-side: "3'38"
- Released: 2 March 1979
- Genre: Post-punk; funk; dub
- Length: 3:23
- Label: Radar
- Songwriter: The Pop Group
- Producer: Dennis Bovell

The Pop Group singles chronology
"She Is Beyond Good and Evil" (1979)	"We Are All Prostitutes" (1979)

Music video
- "She Is Beyond Good and Evil" on youtube.com

"She Is Beyond Good and Evil" is a song by English post-punk band The Pop Group. It was released as a single on March 2, 1979, through Radar Records.

== Lyrics ==
In discussing the song, Stewart described the lyrics as "being about unconditional love as a revolutionary force – where idealism and energy mix poetic, existential, and political yearnings with the romantic idea of passing through nihilism and emerging on the other side with something positive, something beyond."

== Accolades ==
Publication	Country	Accolade	Year	Rank
NME	United Kingdom	Singles of the Year	1979	19
Sounds	United Kingdom	The 100 Best Singles of All Time	1986	69
NME	United Kingdom	The Top 150 Singles of All Time	1987	71
Paul Morley	United Kingdom	Words and Music, 210 Greatest Pop Singles of All Time	2003	*
Pitchfork Media	United States	The Pitchfork 500 (1977–1979)	2008	*
The Guardian	United Kingdom	1000 Songs Everyone Must Hear	2009	*
Q	United Kingdom	50 Ultimate British Songs	2011	27
Treble	United States	The Top 200 Songs of the 1970s	2012	49

(*) designates unordered lists.

== Formats and track listing ==
All songs written by The Pop Group.

UK 7" single (ADA 29)

1. "She Is Beyond Good and Evil" – 3:23
2. "3'38" – 3:38

== Personnel ==
The Pop Group

- Gareth Sager – saxophone, guitar
- Bruce Smith – drums, percussion
- Mark Stewart – vocals
- Simon Underwood – bass guitar
- John Waddington – guitar

Technical personnel

- Dennis Bovell – production
- George Peckham – mastering
