= Edit (album) =

Studio album by Mark Stewart
- Released: 28 March 2008
- Genre: Post-punk
- Length: 41:17
- Label: Crippled Dick Hot Wax!
- Producers: Nick Coplowe, Kevin Martin, Philipp Quehenberger, Adrian Sherwood and Mark Stewart

Mark Stewart chronology
Kiss the Future (2005)	Edit (2008)	The Politics of Envy (2012.)

Professional ratings
Review scores
Source	Rating
AllMusic	4/5 stars

Edit is the sixth album by British singer Mark Stewart, released on 28 March 2008 through Crippled Dick Hot Wax!.

== Accolades ==
Year	Publication	Country	Accolade	Rank
2008	Blow Up	Italy	"Albums of the Year"	20
2008	The Wire	United Kingdom	"Albums of the Year"	47

== Track listing ==
No.	Title	Writer(s)	Length
1.	"Intro"	Mark Stewart	0:14
2.	"Rise Again"	Nick Riggio, Mark Stewart	3:14
3.	"Loner"	Philipp Quehenberger	4:27
4.	"The Puppet Master"	Mark Stewart, Sanjay Tailor	2:57
5.	"Strange Cargo"	Mark Stewart	5:16
6.	"Secret Suburbia"	Mark Stewart	5:15
7.	"Almost Human"	Mark Stewart	4:38
8.	"Freak Circus"	Simon Mundey, Mark Stewart	4:29
9.	"Mr. You're A Better Man Than I"	Brian Hugg, Mike Hugg	3:15
10.	"Radio Freedom"	Kevin Martin, Mark Stewart	2:12
11.	"Secret Outro"	Mark Stewart	5:20

== Personnel ==
Musicians

- Jazzwad – instruments
- The Maffia
- Keith LeBlanc
