= Papa's Got a Brand New Pigbag =

1981 single by Pigbag

Single by Pigbag
- Released: May 1981
- Length: 6:08 (12-inch version); 3:35 (7-inch edit)
- Label: Y; Rough Trade; Fire
- Songwriter: Pigbag
- Producers: Pigbag; Dave Hunt; Dick O'Dell

Pigbag singles chronology
"Papa's Got a Brand New Pigbag" (1981)	"Sunny Day" (1981)

"Papa's Got a Brand New Pigbag" is an instrumental performed by British dance-punk band Pigbag and released as a single in 1981. The track was written by Chris Hamlin and James Johnstone before Pigbag was formed and produced by Dave Hunt and Dick O'Dell. In the United States, it was released as an import on the Rough Trade label, where it made it to number 56 on the US dance chart. A 1982 re-release of "Papa's Got a Brand New Pigbag" went to number three in the United Kingdom. Several covers of the instrumental have been released, including popular versions by Perfecto Allstarz and Thunderpuss.

The piece's title is a play on the James Brown song "Papa's Got a Brand New Bag". Whilst the track is well known for its brass riff, the bassline of the track was also ranked by Stylus Magazine at number 40 in their 2005 list of the "Top 50 Basslines of All Time".

== Charts ==
=== Weekly charts ===
Chart (1981–1983)	Peak position
Belgium (Ultratop 50 Flanders)	26
Ireland (IRMA)	7
Netherlands (Dutch Top 40)	8
Netherlands (Single Top 100)	6
New Zealand (Recorded Music NZ)	22
UK Singles (Official Charts)	3
US Dance Club Songs (Billboard)	56

=== Year-end charts ===
Chart (1982)	Position
UK Singles (OCC)	50

Chart (1983)	Position
Netherlands (Dutch Top 40)	86
Netherlands (Single Top 100)	58

== Perfecto Allstarz version ==
"Reach Up (Papa's Got a Brand New Pigbag)"

Single by Perfecto Allstarz
- Released: 23 January 1995
- Genre: Soul-funk
- Length: 3:40
- Label: EastWest; Perfecto
- Songwriters: Chip Carpenter; Chris Lee; James Johnstone; Ollie Moore; Roger Freeman; Simon Underwood
- Producers: Paul Oakenfold; Steve Osborne

Music video
- "Reach Up (Papa's Got a Brand New Pigbag)" on YouTube

On 23 January 1995, Paul Oakenfold released the track "Reach Up (Papa's Got a Brand New Pigbag)", credited to Perfecto Allstarz. The single, released by EastWest and Perfecto Records, went to number six in the United Kingdom, topped the UK Dance Chart, and also charted in Australia, Ireland, Israel, the Netherlands and Switzerland.

=== Critical reception ===
In his weekly UK chart commentary, James Masterton stated, "The track has lost nothing with time, a glorious catchy soul-funk instrumental that looks set to dominate dancefloors just as it did 13 years ago." Pan-European magazine Music & Media wrote, "Britain's dance and remix culture started through Adrian Sherwood's productions of the Pop Group, to which family tree Pig Bag belonged. So recycling the 1982 instrumental "Papa's Got a Brand New Pig Bag" is only fair." James Hamilton from Music Week's RM Dance Update described it as a "Pigbag's braying brass from 1982 driven now by bursts of Goodmen-ish percussion like Postflix's 'Rototom', in organ and 'reach up' divas prodded 136.2bpm [track]". Mark Sutherland from Smash Hits gave it a top score of five out of five, writing, "This is a trendy rave-up "reinterpretation" of that very moment and is therefore ace in the extreme. Dance craze of the fortnight."

=== Track listings ===
- 12-inch, UK (1995)
1. "Reach Up (Papa's Got a Brand New Pig Bag)" (Perfecto remix)
2. "Reach Up (Papa's Got a Brand New Pig Bag)" (Indian Summer remix)
3. "Zed's Dead"
- CD single, Europe (1995)
1. "Reach Up (Papa's Got a Brand New Pig Bag)" (radio edit) – 3:40
2. "Reach Up (Papa's Got a Brand New Pig Bag)" (Perfecto remix) – 7:02
3. "Reach Up (Papa's Got a Brand New Pig Bag)" (Indian Summer remix) – 6:47
4. "Zed's Dead" – 6:40

=== Charts ===
==== Weekly charts ====
Chart (1995)	Peak position
Australia (ARIA)	82
Europe (Eurochart Hot 100)	18
Europe (European Dance Radio)	18
Ireland (IRMA)	7
Israel (Israeli Singles Chart)	21
Netherlands (Dutch Top 40 Tipparade)	5
Netherlands (Single Top 100)	36
Scottish Singles Sales (Official Charts)	6
Switzerland (Schweizer Hitparade)	49
UK Singles (Official Charts)	6
UK Dance (Official Charts)	1
UK Club Chart (Music Week)	7
UK Pop Tip Club Chart (Music Week)	1

==== Year-end charts ====
Chart (1995)	Position
UK Singles (OCC)	63
UK Pop Tip Club Chart (Music Week)	6

=== Certifications ===
Region	Certification	Certified units/sales
United Kingdom (BPI)	Silver	200,000^{^}
^{^} Shipments figures based on certification alone.

=== Release history ===
Region	Date	Format(s)	Label(s)	Ref.
United Kingdom	23 January 1995	7-inch vinyl; 12-inch vinyl; CD; cassette	EastWest; Perfecto	
Australia	17 April 1995	CD	EastWest; Perfecto	

== Thunderpuss version ==
In 2001, Thunderpuss had a number-one dance hit on the US Hot Dance Club Songs chart when they covered the track.

=== Charts ===
==== Weekly charts ====
Chart (2001)	Peak position
US Dance Club Play (Billboard)	1

==== Year-end charts ====
Chart (2001)	Position
US Dance Club Play (Billboard)	11

== In popular culture ==
- English darts player Adrian Lewis uses "Reach Up" as his pre-match walk-on song. Former 3-times Lakeside World Champion Glen Durrant used the same song in his BDO years, however he was forced to change it as he switched to the PDC circuit to avoid clash with Lewis.
- Molly McCann at UFC Fight Night 208 led the crowd in a chant of "fuck the Tories" using this riff.
- Dutch DJ duo Carte Blanq sampled "Papa's Got a Brand New Pigbag" for their tribute song on Dutch Formula 1 driver Max Verstappen's first World Drivers' Championship victory, "33 Max Verstappen".
- EFL Championship club Queens Park Rangers have used "Papa's Got a Brand New Pigbag" when the home team scores at Loftus Road since 1995.
- EFL Championship club Middlesbrough FC uses "Reach Up" as their club anthem as the players walk out onto the pitch for home games at the Riverside Stadium.
- The Dutch TV series Je Ziet Maar ("You'll See") presented by Hanneke Kappen made "Papa's Got a Brand New Pigbag" the opening and closing tunes of the program a top 10 hit on the Dutch charts.
- The song was the theme of Canadian television show The NewMusic.
- Fans of Dutch Formula One driver Max Verstappen use the tune as an anthem for their hero: "Du Du Dudu, Max Verstappen!"

== See also ==
- List of Billboard number-one dance singles of 2001
