= Metatron (Mark Stewart album) =

Studio album by Mark Stewart
- Released: April 1990
- Genre: Post-punk
- Length: 40:37
- Label: Mute
- Producer: Adrian Sherwood, Mark Stewart

Mark Stewart chronology
Mark Stewart (1987)	Metatron (1990)	Control Data (1996)

Professional ratings
Review scores
Source	Rating
AllMusic	4/5 stars

Metatron is the fourth album by British singer Mark Stewart, released in 1990 through Mute Records.

== Track listing ==
All lyrics are written by Mark Stewart; all music is composed by Keith LeBlanc, Skip McDonald and Doug Wimbish, except where noted

No.	Title	Music	Length
1.	"Hysteria"		6:13
2.	"Shame"		6:55
3.	"Collision"		5:20
4.	"Faith Healer"		4:04
5.	"These Things Happen"	David Harrow, Adrian Sherwood	6:14
6.	"My Possession"	David Harrow	2:18
7.	"Possession Dub"	David Harrow	3:15
8.	"Mammon"		6:20

== Personnel ==
Musicians

- The Maffia
  - Keith LeBlanc – drums
  - Skip McDonald – guitar
  - Adrian Sherwood – keyboards, production, mixing, recording
  - Doug Wimbish – bass guitar
- Mark Stewart – vocals, production, mixing, recording

'Additional musicians and production

- David Harrow – keyboards, programming
- Jill Mumford – design
- Nimbus – mastering
