= Y (album) =

Studio album by The Pop Group
- Released: 20 April 1979
- Recorded: 1978–1979
- Studios: Ridge Farm Studios in Surrey, England
- Genres: Post-punk; funk; dub; experimental rock
- Length: 40:11
- Label: Radar
- Producers: Dennis Bovell; The Pop Group

The Pop Group chronology
Y (1979)	For How Much Longer Do We Tolerate Mass Murder? (1980)

Y is the debut studio album of English post-punk band The Pop Group. The album was produced by dub musician Dennis "Blackbeard" Bovell at Ridge Farm Studios in Surrey, and was released on 20 April 1979 through Radar Records. It has since been reissued several times, including in 2019 by Mute Records with bonus material to mark its 40th anniversary.

Y initially received mixed critical reviews but has since received acclaim. Pitchfork ranked it at number 35 on its list of The Top 100 Albums of the 1970s. The Wire included it in its list of "The 100 Most Important Records Ever Made".

== Background and recording ==
Inspired by the energy of punk rock but disillusioned by its musical traditionalism, The Pop Group initially set out as funk band, drawing influence from black dance music and radical political traditions. Soon after forming, they began to gain notoriety for their live performances, landing them a contract with Radar Records and a cover of the NME. They issued their debut single, "She Is Beyond Good and Evil" in early 1979.

To record their debut, the group teamed with British dub reggae producer Dennis Bovell. Critic Simon Reynolds wrote that "Bovell's mix of acid-rock wildness and dub wisdom made him [...] the ideal candidate for the not hugely enviable task of giving The Pop Group's unruly sound some semblance of cohesion", noting that he grounded the band's sound in its rhythm section while utilising a variety of production effects. Writing for Fact, Mark Fisher characterised the album's sound as a "delirial montage of funk, free jazz, Jamaican audio-mancy and the avant-garde", describing it as "both carvernous and propulsive, ultra-abstract yet driven by dance music's physical imperatives". He noted the "sonic alchemy" of Bovell's production work. PopMatters wrote that the group "sharpened the straightforward guitar lines of punk, the bounding throb of funk rhythms, and the sonic manipulation of dub and let them penetrate each other in ridiculously slapdash fashion."

== Critical reception ==
Professional ratings
Review scores
Source	Rating
AllMusic	4.5/5 stars
Mojo	4/5 stars
Record Collector	4/5 stars
Sounds	3.5/5 stars
Uncut	9/10

Upon its release, Y received mixed reviews. In 1979, the NME described it as "a brave failure. Exciting but exasperating". In recent years, the album has risen in critical estimations. In 2008, Mark Fisher wrote "Joy Division’s Closer is often considered the crown jewel of post-punk, but Y – inchoate with potential, the fire to Joy Division’s ice – has an equal claim". Simon Reynolds called it "a heroic mess, glorious in its overreach". Stylus Magazine called the album "a landmark of lunatic post-punk", writing that "these are political punk tunes deconstructed so that only the skeleton remains, and weaving between those bare bones are some of the nastiest sounds ever made".

In 2004, Pitchfork ranked Y at number 35 on its list of the greatest albums of the 1970s, saying that "unlike most of the late-70s' no-wave types (and perennial imitators), The Pop Group were less concerned with eschewing convention than with vehemently eviscerating it". PopMatters named it the 11th best post-punk album ever in 2017. The album has had a lasting impact, with artists such as the Minutemen, Primal Scream, Sonic Youth and Nick Cave citing the album as an influence on their work. Minutemen bassist Mike Watt commented that "The Pop Group said 'let's take Funkadelic and put it with Beefheart. Why not?'"

=== Accolades ===
Publication	Country	Accolade	Year	Rank
Rockerilla	Italy	Albums of the Year	1979	14
The Wire	United Kingdom	The 100 Most Important Records Ever Made	1992	*
Spex	Germany	The 100 Albums of the Century	1999	51
Il Mucchio Selvaggio	Italy	100 Best Albums by Decade (1971–1980)	2002	41
Rock de Lux	Spain	The 200 Best Albums of All Time	2002	145
Paul Morley	United Kingdom	Greatest Albums of All Time	2003	*
Pitchfork	United States	Top 100 Albums of the 1970s	2004	35
PopMatters	United States	The 50 Best Post-Punk Albums Ever	2017	11
Stylus	United States	Top 101-200 Albums of All Time	2004	168
Blow Up	Italy	600 Essential Albums	2005	*
Uncut	United Kingdom	The 100 Greatest Debut Albums	2006	82
The Guardian	United Kingdom	1000 Albums to Hear Before You Die	2007	*

(*) designates unordered lists.

== Track listing ==
Original album

All tracks are written by The Pop Group.

Side one
No.	Title	Length
1.	"Thief of Fire"	4:35
2.	"Snowgirl"	3:20
3.	"Blood Money"	2:56
4.	"Savage Sea"	3:01
5.	"We Are Time"	6:29

Side two
No.	Title	Length
1.	"Words Disobey Me"	3:25
2.	"Don't Call Me Pain"	5:34
3.	"The Boys From Brazil"	4:15
4.	"Don't Sell Your Dreams"	6:37

2007 Rhino/Radar Reissue CD

No.	Title	Length
1.	"She Is Beyond Good and Evil"	3:23
2.	"Thief of Fire"	4:35
3.	"Snowgirl"	3:21
4.	"Blood Money"	2:57
5.	"We Are Time"	6:29
6.	"Savage Sea"	3:02
7.	"Words Disobey Me"	3:26
8.	"Don't Call Me Pain"	5:35
9.	"The Boys From Brazil"	4:16
10.	"Don't Sell Your Dreams"	6:42
11.	"3'38"	3:38

1 and 11 are the A and B sides of the "She is Beyond Good and Evil" single. The 1996 reissue CD and LP on Radar consists of tracks 1–10 above.

2019 Mute 40th Anniversary Reissues

The original album appears in all versions in its original track order, half-speed remastered at Abbey Road Studios. The CD includes "She is Beyond Good and Evil" and "3'38" as tracks 10 and 11, while the LP and the deluxe and regular vinyl box sets include them as an extra 45 RPM 12" single, which was also half-speed remastered. A limited edition cassette (its first legitimate release on that format) contains the album only, but the enclosed download code includes the single tracks. Also included in the deluxe vinyl and CD sets (and reissued as stand alone vinyl LPs in 2020) were two extra related albums, with studio outtakes and live performances of the album's songs. All the vinyl versions except the 2020 extras reissues include download cards for high-definition digital files of their respective audio contents.

Alien Blood

No.	Title	Length
1.	"Kiss the Book"	2:32
2.	"Don't Call Me Pain (First Mix)"	2:24
3.	"Thief of Fire (Bass Addict)"	4:29
4.	"Words Disobey Me (Dennis the Menace Mix)"	3:25
5.	"Don't Sell Your Dreams ('A' Mix)" (track 10 on the LP)	5:34
6.	"Boys from Brazil (Ridge Reels)"	4:36
7.	"Savage Sea (Sparse)"	2:44
8.	"Snowgirl (Take 3)"	3:24
9.	"Blood Money (Slow Thief)"	4:24
10.	"We Are Time (Ricochet)" (track 5 on the LP)	6:23

Y Live!

No.	Title	Length
1.	"Thief of Fire"	4:41
2.	"Snowgirl"	3:57
3.	"Blood Money"	1:47
4.	"Savage Sea"	3:09
5.	"We Are Time"	7:03
6.	"Words Disobey Me"	3:31
7.	"Don't Call Me Pain"	4:50
8.	"The Boys From Brazil"	4:33
9.	"Don't Sell Your Dreams"	1:57

== Personnel ==
Adapted from the Y liner notes.

The Pop Group

- Gareth Sager – guitar, saxophone, piano
- Bruce Smith – drums, percussion
- Mark Stewart – vocals
- Simon Underwood – bass guitar
- John Waddington – guitar

Additional musicians

- Disc O'Dell – musical direction

Technical personnel

- Dennis Bovell – production
- Mike Dunne – engineering
- Brian Gaylor – assistant engineering
- Eddy Gorecki – mastering
- The Pop Group – production

== Release history ==
Region	Date	Label	Format	Catalogue
United Kingdom	1979	Radar	LP	RAD 20
Japan	1979	Warner-Pioneer Corporation	LP	P-10705F
United Kingdom	1996	Radar	CD	SCANCD14
Japan	1996	Radar	CD	WPCR-722
United Kingdom	2007	Rhino, Radar	CD	5101-19920-2
Japan	2013	Warner Music Group	CD	WPCR-15282
