= Y Records =

British record label

- Parent company: Independent label, later incorporated into Kaz Records, which became part of Castle Communications
- Founded: 1980
- Founder: Dick O’Dell
- Distributors: Rough Trade; Castle Communications
- Genre: Indie, post-punk
- Country of origin: United Kingdom

Y Records was a British independent record label set up in 1980 by Dick O'Dell in the United Kingdom, and distributed by Rough Trade.

== History ==
Artists included the Slits, Shriekback and a number of groups that were associated with the Bristol indie band scene from the late 1970s: the Pop Group, Glaxo Babies, Maximum Joy and Pigbag.

The label's first release in 1980 ("Where There's a Will There's a Way" / "In the Beginning There Was Rhythm") was a split single by the Pop Group and the Slits, bands which shared a drummer (Bruce Smith) as well as manager (Dick O'Dell). Pigbag's single, "Papa's Got a Brand New Pigbag") entered the UK Indie Chart in May 1981, and stayed there for 70 weeks in total, peaking at No. 1.

Y Records were eventually incorporated into Kaz Records, part of Castle Communications. O'Dell later joined with William Orbit's progressive house music company, Guerilla Records, which became prominent in British progressive house music in the early 1990s, with acts such as Leftfield, Spooky, React to Rhythm and D.O.P.

== Discography ==
- Y1: The Pop Group/The Slits - "In the Beginning There Was Rhythm / Where There's a Will..." 7" (co-released as Rough Trade RT039)
- Y2: The Pop Group - For How Much Longer Do We Tolerate Mass Murder LP (co-released as Rough Trade ROUGH 9)
- Y3: The Slits - Bootleg Retrospective LP (coverless authorized bootleg)
- Y4: The Slits - "Man Next Door" 7" (co-released as Rough Trade RT044)
- Y5: The Pop Group - We Are Time LP (co-released as Rough Trade ROUGH 12)
- Y6: Glaxo Babies - "Limited Entertainment"/"You Can Sell Your Soul for a Pot of Gold, 24 Hours a Day" 7"
- Y7: The Slits - "Animal Space" 7" (co-released as Human Records HUM 4)
- Y8: Vincent Units - "Carnival Song"/"Everything Is Going to Be All Wrong" 7"/cassette
- Y9: Steve Beresford/Tristan Honsinger - Double Indemnity LP
- Y10: Pigbag - "Papa's Got a Brand New Pigbag" 7"/12"
- Y11: Maximum Joy - "Stretch"/"Silent Street" 7"/12"
- Y12: Pigbag - "Sunny Day" 7"/12"
- Y13: Tristan Honsinger/Steve Beresford/Toshinori Kondo/David Toop - "Imitation of Life" LP
- Y14: Tesco Bombers - "Hernando’s Hideaway" 7"
- Y15: Maximum Joy - "White and Green Place" 7"/12"
- Y16: Pigbag - "Getting Up" 7"/12"
- Y17: Pigbag - Dr. Heckle & Mr. Jive LP
- Y18: Diamanda Galas - The Litanies of Satan LP
- Y19: Sun Ra - Strange Celestial Road LP
- Y20: Mouth - "Who's Hot" 7"/10" with double groove featuring different versions of the song
- Y21: Shriekback - Tench MLP
- Y22: Shriekback - "Sexthinkone" 7"
- Y23: Christopher Reeves - "Dining at Dzerzhinsky's" 7"/12"
- Y24: Pigbag - "The Big Bean" 7"/12"
- Y25: Pulsallama - "The Devil Lives in My Husband's Body"/"Ungawa Pt. II" 7"/12" double A-side single
- Y26: Maximum Joy - "In the Air" 7"/12"
- Y27: Shriekback - "My Spine Is the Baseline" 7"/12"
- Y28: Maximum Joy - Station MXJY LP
- Y29: Tymon Dogg - Battle of Wills LP
- Y30: R.A.P.P featuring Archie Pool - R.A.P.P. Presents Wicked City featuring Archie Pool LP
- Y31: The Promenaders - The Promenaders LP
- Y32: Disconnection - "Bali Ha'i" 12"
- Y33⅓: Various - Birth of the Y LP
- Y LP 501: Pigbag - Lend an Ear LP
- Y LP 502: Shriekback - Care LP
- Y LP 504: Shriekback - Jam Science LP (not authorized by the band)
- Y MP 1001: Pigbag - Live MLP
- Y PB 100: Pigbag - Favourite Things compilation LP
- Y RA 1: Sun Ra Arkestra - "Nuclear War"/"Sometimes I'm Happy" 12"
- Y RA 2: Sun Ra Arkestra - Nuclear War LP (released in Italy)
- Y(T)101: Pigbag - "Hit the O'Deck" 7"/12"
- Y(T)102: Shriekback - "Lined Up" 7"/12"
- YT103: Pulsallama - "Qui Qui (A Canadian in Paris)" 12"
- Y(T)104: Shriekback - "Working on the Ground" 7"/12"
- Y(T)106: Shriekback - "Lined Up"/"My Spine" 7"/12"/12" picture disc

== See also ==
- List of record labels
- The Slits
- Shriekback
- The Pop Group
- Glaxo Babies
- Maximum Joy
- Pigbag
- 99 Records
- List of bands from Bristol
