= For How Much Longer Do We Tolerate Mass Murder? =

Studio album by The Pop Group
- Released: 21 March 1980
- Studio: Foel Studios, Llanfair Caereinion, Powys
- Genre: Post-punk; avant-funk; dance-punk
- Length: 31:57
- Label: Rough Trade, Y
- Producer: The Pop Group

The Pop Group chronology
Y (1979)	For How Much Longer Do We Tolerate Mass Murder? (1980)	We Are Time (1980)

For How Much Longer Do We Tolerate Mass Murder? is the second studio album by English post-punk band The Pop Group. It was released on 21 March 1980 through the record labels Rough Trade and Y.

Initially released to mixed reviews, the album has received critical acclaim in recent years. After being commercially unavailable for several decades, it was reissued in February 2016.

All Japanese Rough Trade CD editions were identical to the original LP, but the UK Freaks R Us CD is incomplete, replacing the track "One Out of Many" with the stand-alone single "We Are All Prostitutes". The 2016 reissue also uses this tracklisting.

== Background and music ==
For How Much Longer Do We Tolerate Mass Murder? was recorded at Foel Studios. The photo on the cover is the photograph Two Gypsies by André Kertész.

Mark Fisher described the album's mix of "murky funk, free jazz squalls, dub diffraction, howls and shrieks" as "the sound of a society falling apart." Comparing it to the group's debut, AllMusic wrote that "the lean, blunt sound of this album connects with even greater ferocity, starting with a guitar-driven variation on James Brown's primal funk sides of the late '60s and adding elements of free jazz, atonal experimental music, and found noises until the music begins to sound like some sort of riot pouring out of your stereo."

== Reception ==
Professional ratings
Review scores
Source	Rating
AllMusic	4/5 stars
PopMatters	9/10
Record Collector	4/5 stars

Upon its release in 1980, For How Much Longer received mixed reviews, with publications at the center of post-punk discourse (such as the NME) dismissing its agit-prop didacticism in favor of the fevered mysticism of the group's debut album, Y.

In recent years, however, writers have lauded the album's musical and political radicalism. PopMatters called the work "a genre-defining (and genre-defying) epic, as fearsome and fearless as popular music can be." AllMusic opined that "Gang of Four's stellar early work sounds meek and toothless compared to the Molotov cocktail that is For How Much Longer Do We Tolerate Mass Murder." Mark Fisher, writing for Fact, stated that "the debates provoked by For How Much Longer rehearsed some of the disputes over aesthetics and politics that had exercised revolutionaries throughout the twentieth century. Was the message the most important thing, or was it formal innovation that made artworks revolutionary? The remarkable thing about For How Much Longer is that it refuses to choose". In 2016, Record Collector described the album as "highly relevant" and "frighteningly prescient," stating that "the post-punk Bristolian radicals did actually succeed in synthesising something fierce, funky and fantastic from their unholy mash-up of Ornette Coleman, Funkadelic and heavyweight, Channel One-style dub.

== Accolades ==
Publication	Country	Accolade	Year	Rank
Rockerilla	Italy	Albums of the Year	1980	11
Uncut	United Kingdom	The 50 Greatest Lost Albums	2004	35

== Track listing ==
All tracks are written by The Pop Group.

Side one
No.	Title	Length
1.	"Forces of Oppression"	2:33
2.	"Feed the Hungry"	4:15
3.	"One Out of Many"	1:52
4.	"Blind Faith"	4:03
5.	"How Much Longer"	4:57

Side two
No.	Title	Length
1.	"Justice"	3:06
2.	"There Are No Spectators"	4:13
3.	"Communicate"	4:40
4.	"Rob a Bank"	2:18

== Personnel ==
Adapted from the For How Much Longer Do We Tolerate Mass Murder? liner notes.

The Pop Group

- Dan Catsis – bass guitar
- Gareth Sager – guitar, saxophone
- Bruce Smith – drums, percussion
- Mark Stewart – vocals
- John Waddington – guitar

Additional musicians

- The Last Poets – arrangements (A3)

Technical

- Dave Anderson – mixing, recording
- The Pop Group – production, recording

== Charts ==
Chart (1980)	Peak position
UK Indie Chart	1

== Release history ==
Region	Date	Label	Format	Catalog
United Kingdom	1980	Rough Trade, Y	LP	ROUGH 9, Y 2
Italy	1980	Go International	LP	SER 02
Japan	1981	Japan Record	LP	RTL-1
Italy	1981	Base Record	LP	Rough 9 Y5
Japan	1994	TDK Core Co. Ltd.	CD	TDCN-5153
Japan	1996	TDK Core Co. Ltd.	CD	TDCN-5575
