= Dan Catsis =

English musician (born 1959)

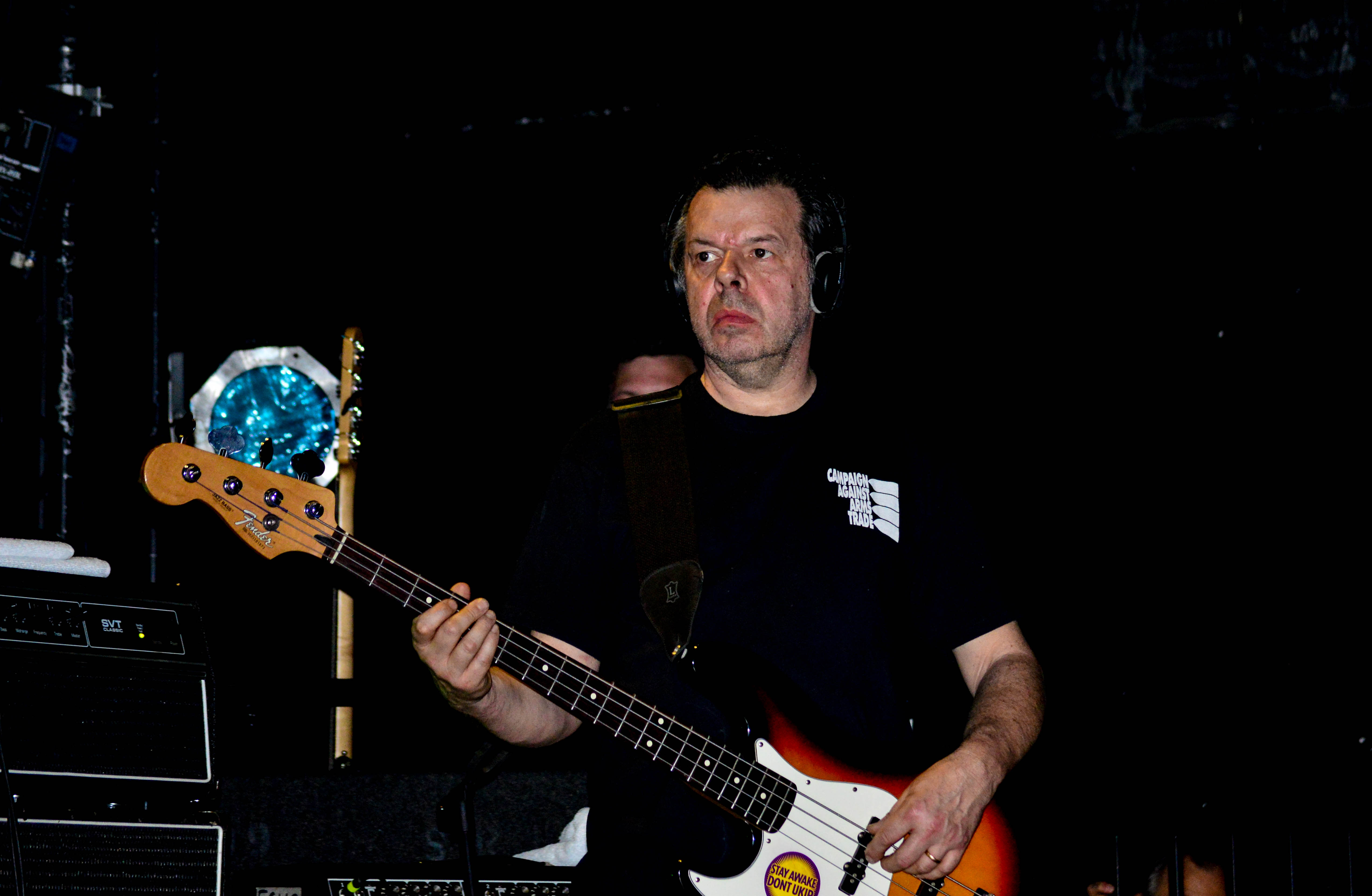
- Catsis with The Pop Group in 2015

Background information
- Born: Daniel Catsis; 30 November 1959 (age 66)
- Origin: Bristol, England
- Genres: Post-punk, experimental rock
- Occupation: Musician
- Instruments: Guitar, bass guitar
- Years active: 1977–present
- Labels: Heartbeat, Radar, Y

Dan Catsis (born 30 November 1959) is an English musician who served as the guitarist for the punk band Glaxo Babies, which he founded with Geoff Alsopp and Tom Nichols in 1977 in Bristol, England. He was also a member of The Pop Group between 1979 and 1980, performing bass guitar on their second album and two singles. In 2010, he rejoined The Pop Group as they embarked on their reunion tour.

== Discography ==
| Year | Artist | Album | Label |
|---|---|---|---|
| 1980 | The Pop Group | For How Much Longer Do We Tolerate Mass Murder? | Rough Trade, Y |
| 1980 | Glaxo Babies | Nine Months to the Disco | Heartbeat Records |
| 1980 | Glaxo Babies | Put Me on the Guest List | Heartbeat Records |
| 1983 | Blue Aeroplanes | Bop Art | Abstract Sounds |
| 2015 | The Pop Group | Citizen Zombie | Freaks R Us |
| 2016 | The Pop Group | Honeymoon On Mars | Freaks R Us |
