= John Waddington (musician) =

- Born: 1 January 1960
- Died: 20 June 2023 (aged 63)
- Genres: Post-punk, experimental rock
- Occupation: Musician
- Instruments: Guitar, bass guitar
- Years active: 1977–2023
- Labels: Radar, Y
- Formerly of: The Boyfriends, Maximum Joy, Perfume, The Pop Group, U-BahnX

John Waddington (1 January 1960 – 20 June 2023) was an English musician known as the guitarist for the English post-punk group The Pop Group.

== Biography ==
At the age of 17, John Waddington started his first band, serving as vocalist, guitarist, and principal songwriter for the punk group The Boyfriends. The band was short-lived, and he co-founded The Pop Group in 1977, serving as one of their guitarists. He performed on their two albums, Y and For How Much Longer Do We Tolerate Mass Murder?, which were critically acclaimed. After The Pop Group disbanded in 1981, he was asked to join another post-punk band, Maximum Joy. He was also involved in the short-lived German electro outfit U-BahnX with Disc O'Dell. Waddington was absent from Pop Group reunions and his last performance credit was on Lily Allen's 2006 album, Alright, Still.

John Waddington died on 20 June 2023, at the age of 63.

== Discography ==
=== Studio albums ===
Year	Artist	Album	Label
1979	The Pop Group	Y	Radar
1980	The Pop Group	For How Much Longer Do We Tolerate Mass Murder?	Rough Trade, Y
1981	New Age Steppers	The New Age Steppers	On-U Sound
1982	Playgroup	Epic Sound Battles – Chapter One	Cherry Red
1982	Maximum Joy	Station MXJY	Y
1997	Perfume	One	Big Star

=== Guest appearances ===
Year	Album	Artist	Details
1981	My Life in a Hole in the Ground	African Head Charge	Guitar ("Hole in the Roof")
1982	Pal Judy	Judy Nylon	Guitar ("Room Without a View")
2006	Alright, Still	Lily Allen	Bass guitar ("Take What You Take")
