= Bruce Smith (musician) =

British musician (born 1960)

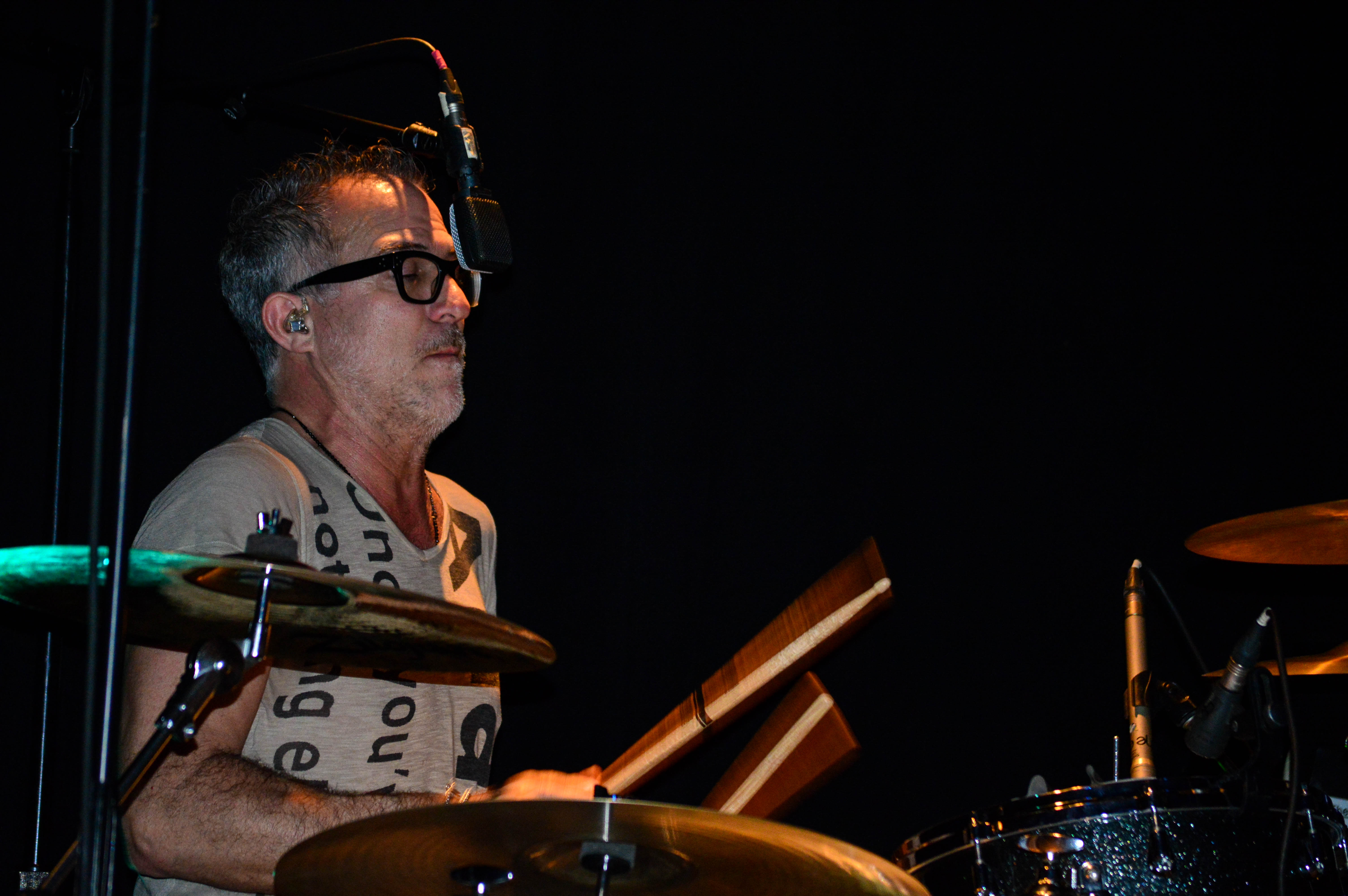
- Smith with The Pop Group in 2015

Background information
- Also known as: Minty
- Born: Bruce Neal Smith; 14 December 1960 (age 65); California, United States of America
- Origin: Bristol, England
- Genres: Post-punk, alternative rock
- Occupation: Musician
- Instrument: Drums
- Years active: 1977–present

Bruce Neal Smith (born 14 December 1960 in California) is an American musician best known as the drummer for post-punk band The Pop Group. He has also been a member of The Slits and the New Age Steppers and performed with Public Image Ltd from 1986 to 1992, and then from 2009 to 2025. He was raised and educated in Bristol, England and was once married to Neneh Cherry.

== Career ==
Smith helped co-found The Pop Group in 1977 and would play with them until they disbanded in 1981. Smith was also part of the line-up when the band re-formed in 2010.

While the Pop Group was still active, Smith also joined The Slits in 1979, replacing Budgie, and would play with them until they disbanded in 1981.

After the Pop Group and the Slits, Smith teamed up with Adrian Sherwood and performed with the New Age Steppers and various other acts on Sherwood's On-U Sound Records label. He married Neneh Cherry, who was also involved with the New Age Steppers, during this period. Smith and Cherry then went on to form Rip Rig + Panic with former Pop Group guitarist Gareth Sager. This band performed from 1981 to 1983.

In 1986 Smith joined PiL for the tour to support their Album release and became a permanent member of the band, playing on their next two studio albums Happy? and 9. Smith left PiL in 1990 a few years before the band broke up. However, Smith re-joined the band when John Lydon reformed it in 2009.

In addition to working with his regular bands, Smith has also done a lot of session work, recording with artists such as Sananda Maitreya, The The and Björk.

Bruce Smith's father was the celebrated avant-garde artist Hassel Smith.

== Partial discography ==
=== The Pop Group ===
- Y - The Pop Group (1979)
- For How Much Longer Do We Tolerate Mass Murder? - The Pop Group (1980)
- We Are Time - The Pop Group (1980)
- We Are All Prostitutes (comp) - The Pop Group (1998)
- Idealists in Distress From Bristol (comp) - The Pop Group (2007)
- Citizen Zombie - The Pop Group (2015)

=== Rip Rig + Panic ===
- God - Rip Rig + Panic (1981)
- I Am Cold - Rip Rig + Panic (1982)
- Attitude - Rip Rig + Panic (1983)
- Knee Deep in Hits (comp) - Rip Rig + Panic (1990)

=== Public Image Ltd ===
- Happy? - Public Image Ltd (1987)
- 9 - Public Image Ltd (1989)
- ALiFE 2009 (live) - Public Image Ltd (2009)
- Live at Isle of Wight Festival 2011 (live) - Public Image Ltd (2011)
- This is PiL - Public Image Ltd (2012)
- What the World Needs Now... - Public Image Ltd (2015)
- End of World - Public Image Ltd (2023)

=== Others ===
- New Age Steppers - New Age Steppers (1980)
- Threat To Creation - Creation Rebel / New Age Steppers (1981)
- Return of the Giant Slits - The Slits (1981)
- Environmental Studies - African Head Charge (1982)
- Sir Henry at N'didi’s Kraal - Vivian Stanshall (1984)
- Introducing the Hardline According to Terence Trent D'Arby - Terence Trent D'Arby (1987)
- Dusk - The The (1992)
- Debut - Björk (1993)
- Sweetback - Sweetback (1996)
