= Radar Records =

British record label

- The Radar logo, designed by Barney Bubbles
- Founded: 1977 (first version); 1995 (second version)
- Founder: Andrew Lauder, Martin Davis, Tim Read, Jake Riviera (first version); Rob Collins, Graeme Beattie (second version)
- Defunct: 1981 (first version); 1998 (second version)
- Distributors: WEA Records (world except US & Canada); Polydor Records (US & Canada, first version only)
- Genre: Punk rock; new wave; post-punk; alternative rock; indie rock; garage rock
- Country of origin: United Kingdom
- Location: London

Radar Records was a UK-based record label formed in late 1977 by Martin Davis (managing director) who had previously worked at United Artists Records, and Andrew Lauder, who had previously been head of A&R at the UK divisions of Liberty Records and United Artists. The label's first records were released in early 1978.

== History ==
Radar was distributed in most of the world by WEA Records (now known as Warner Music Group). In the United States, three Radar artists (the Inmates, Bram Tchaikovsky and Yachts) were signed to Polydor Records through a licensing deal.

Nick Lowe released both the first Radar single ("I Love the Sound of Breaking Glass"/"They Called It Rock", ADA 1) and its first album (Jesus of Cool, RAD 1). Lowe had previously been signed to Stiff Records, as had several other Radar acts, including Yachts, Richard Hell and the Voidoids, and Radar's major act, Elvis Costello and the Attractions. Costello and Lowe were brought to Radar by their manager Jake Riviera when Riviera left Stiff, which he had co-founded.

Other prominent Radar acts included La Düsseldorf, the Pop Group, Loudon Wainwright III, Pere Ubu, Clive Langer and the Boxes, 999, Wayne Kramer, the Soft Boys, Bette Bright and the Illuminations, Tanz Der Youth, Visage and Métal Urbain. Several of Radar's early releases (including Iggy Pop and James Williamson's Kill City, National Lampoon's That's Not Funny, That's Sick!, the Good Rats' From Rats to Riches and Pezband's Laughing in the Dark) were licensed from independent American labels. Radar also released new albums by original 1950s rockabilly singers Ray Campi and Mac Curtis through an arrangement with Rollin' Rock Records.

Some Radar releases were reissues of garage rock and psychedelic rock bands from the 1960s. Through its WEA connections, Radar was able to re-release recordings by the Shadows of Knight (originally on the Atlantic-distributed Dunwich Records) and the Electric Prunes (originally on the Warner Bros.-distributed Reprise Records). In addition, Radar licensed the International Artists catalog, allowing them to reissue albums by the 13th Floor Elevators, the Lost & Found and the Red Krayola. Radar also released new recordings by the Red Krayola's late 1970s lineup, which included the single "Wives in Orbit" b/w "Yik-Yak" as well as their album Soldier-Talk.

The label's two biggest commercially successful artists, Nick Lowe and Elvis Costello, jumped to F-Beat Records (a new label set up by Lauder and Rivera) in 1980.

The original Radar label put out its last release in 1981, but it was revived with a new roster between 1995 and 1998. Notable bands signed to the second version of Radar included Midget, Prolapse, Acacia, Morning Glories, Heave, Unsophisticates and Pure Morning, a precursor of Clinic.

== See also ==
- List of record labels
