= The Pop Group =

English band

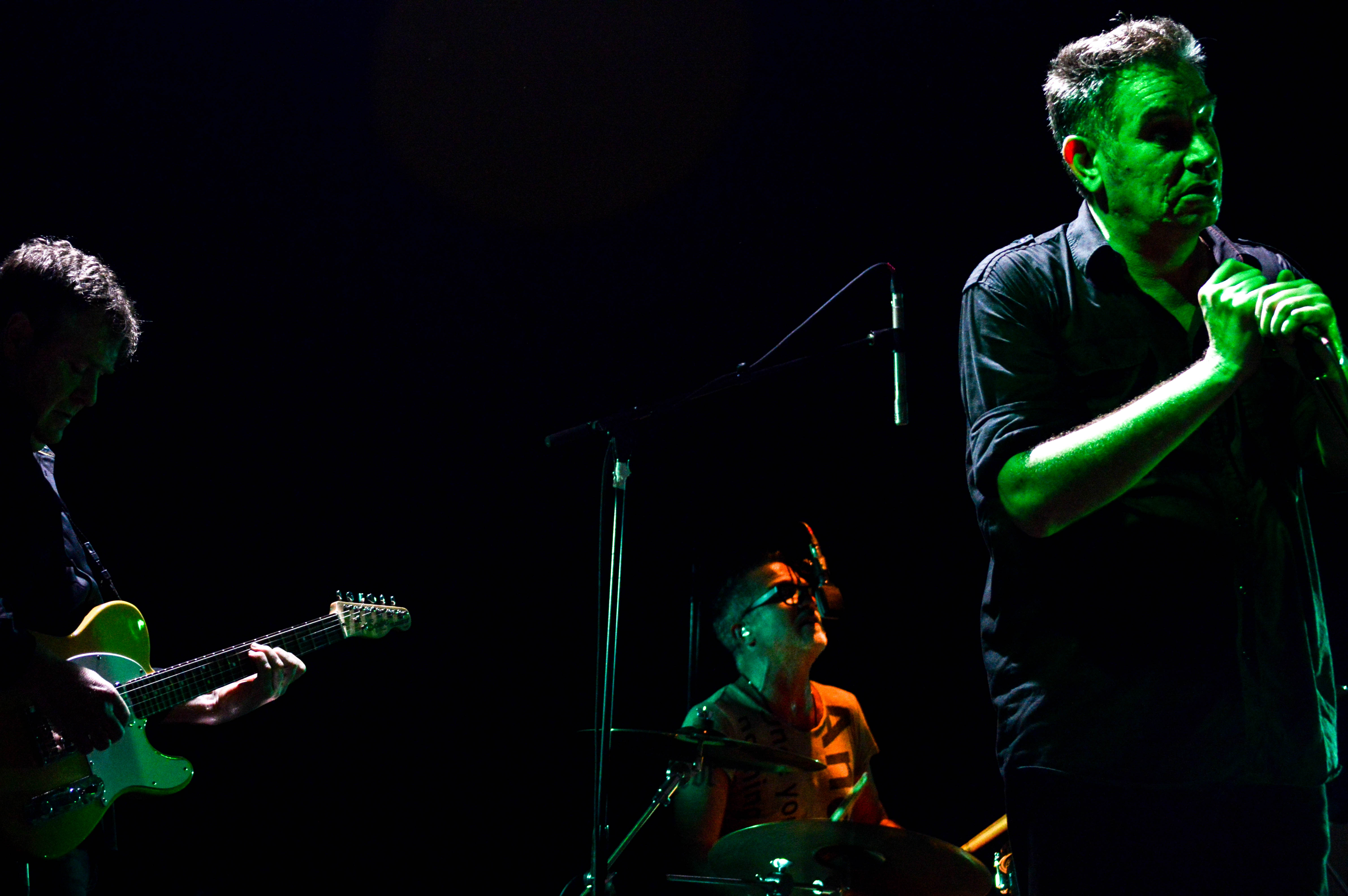
- The Pop Group in 2014

Background information
- Origin: Bristol, England, UK
- Genres: Post-punk; avant-funk; experimental
- Years active: 1977–1981, 2010–2023
- Labels: Freaks R Us, Rough Trade, Radar Records
- Spinoffs: New Age Steppers; Rip Rig + Panic
- Past members: Mark Stewart; Simon Underwood; John Waddington; Gareth Sager; Bruce Smith; Dan Catsis
- Website: Official website

The Pop Group were an English rock band formed in Bristol in 1977 by vocalist Mark Stewart, guitarist John Waddington, bassist Simon Underwood, guitarist/saxophonist Gareth Sager, and drummer Bruce Smith. Their work in the late 1970s crossed diverse musical influences including punk, dub, funk, and free jazz with radical politics, helping to pioneer post-punk music.

The group released two albums, Y (1979) and For How Much Longer Do We Tolerate Mass Murder? (1980), and singles such as "She Is Beyond Good and Evil" and "We Are All Prostitutes" (both 1979), then split in 1981. Its members worked on a variety of subsequent projects, including New Age Steppers and Rip Rig + Panic. In 2010, the band reunited, touring and releasing new material as well as reissuing their back catalogue on Freaks R Us. Stewart and Waddington both died in 2023.

== History ==
=== Original run (1977–1981) ===
The Pop Group was formed in 1977 in Bristol when teenager Mark Stewart set out to start a funk group with schoolmates John Waddington and Simon Underwood. Inspired by the energy of punk rock but feeling the style to be too conservative, the group drew influence from the avant-garde, black music styles such as free jazz and dub, and radical political traditions. Guitarist Gareth Sager and drummer Bruce Smith were eventually added to the group. Soon after forming, they began to gain notoriety for their live performances and were signed to Radar Records. They appeared on the cover of the NME. The band donated the proceeds from their first high-profile tour to Amnesty International. They issued their debut single "She Is Beyond Good and Evil" in March 1979 and their debut album Y in April of that year, both to acclaim. Regardless, their moderate success was sufficient to convince Rough Trade to sign the band. During this period, Dan Catsis replaced Underwood on bass.

The band's career with Rough Trade began with the release of the single "We Are All Prostitutes." This was followed by the release of their second album For How Much Longer Do We Tolerate Mass Murder? (1980). Shortly afterwards the Pop Group released a split single, "Where There's a Will...", with the Slits, a band with whom they shared a drummer (Bruce Smith) and manager Dick O'Dell. The band's last live performance was in 1980 to a crowd of 500,000 people at Trafalgar Square as part of the Campaign for Nuclear Disarmament protest. They split in 1981 after legal wranglings and internal disagreements. Members of the group collaborated and joined bands such as Pigbag, Maximum Joy, Head, the Slits and Rip Rig + Panic, the latter notable for the involvement of Neneh Cherry. Stewart subsequently embarked on a solo career and went on to collaborate with Adrian Sherwood and On-U Sound, prior to a series of albums on Mute Records.

=== Reformation (2010–2023) ===
In 2010, The Pop Group reunited for a special edition of ATP festival curated by Simpsons creator Matt Groening, with members Mark Stewart, Gareth Sager, Bruce Smith and Dan Catsis. Over the next few years the band engaged in a prolific series of releases on the label Freaks R Us. The 1980 LP We Are Time was reissued worldwide on 20 October 2014, and the band released a compilation of rarities titled Cabinet of Curiosities. In support of the reissues, the band undertook a seven-day tour of the UK, and in February 2015, released Citizen Zombie, their first studio album in 35 years. They then went on a worldwide tour with dates in the U.S., Japan, and Australia, followed by an extensive European tour culminating in festival appearances, including two live sets at Glastonbury.

In February 2016 For How Much Longer Do We Tolerate Mass Murder? was rereleased on CD and released digitally for the first time. This was accompanied by the release of a colour vinyl edition of "We Are All Prostitutes," referred to by The Vinyl Factory. A previously unseen video for "We Are All Prostitutes", shot at the Electric Ballroom in November 1979 but thought to be lost, was recovered from the attic of video artist Chris Reynolds and unveiled. In May, the band released a collection of live recordings titled The Boys Whose Head Exploded. Throughout 2016, the band worked on new material with producer Dennis Bovell, and in October Honeymoon on Mars was released. In 2019, the band's debut album Y, produced by Dennis Bovell, was reissued by Mute Records with unreleased live and studio recordings. This was followed by Y in Dub in 2021, a new dub-focused interpretation of the album, once again produced by Dennis Bovell.

On 21 April 2023, Mark Stewart died at the age of 62.

John Waddington's death was announced on 21 June 2023. He was 63.

== Style and influences ==
The Pop Group have been called pioneers of the late-1970s post-punk movement. The Guardian wrote that the Pop Group "almost singlehandedly effected the transition from punk to post-punk," noting that they "– ahead of Gang of Four, PiL, A Certain Ratio and the rest – steered punk towards a radical, politicised mash-up of dub, funk, free jazz and the avant-garde." Louder Than War called them "one of the most wildly innovative and barrier-shattering bands to emerge from the late ’70s post-punk era." Rolling Stone described the group as "an explosive mutant gene," asserting that "among their rabble-rousing post-punk contemporaries, none boasted as much sheer musical inventiveness and audacity." Theorist Mark Fisher described their sound as "both cavernous and propulsive, ultra-abstract yet driven by dance music’s physical imperatives."

The group cited a number of artists and bands as influences, including James Brown, Funkadelic, Nico, John Cage, Karlheinz Stockhausen, Ornette Coleman, Albert Ayler, Captain Beefheart, King Tubby, Miles Davis, Pharoah Sanders, Sun Ra, Debussy, Neu!, Television, the New York Dolls, Jacques Brel, The Who, Subway Sect and Steve Reich as well as non-musical sources such as French romanticism, Antonin Artaud, Beat poetry, Comte de Lautréamont, Jean Baudrillard, the Situationists, and existential philosophy. Addressing the group's shift toward an agitprop sensibility on their second album, released during the rise of Thatcherism, Mark Fisher wrote that the group's goal was "emotional engineering, a jolting out of the ideological trance that accepts injustice as inevitable."

== Influence and legacy ==
The Pop Group's music inspired and influenced many bands and artists that followed them. Minutemen and fIREHOSE bassist Mike Watt has stated that

Pop Group had an incredible influence on the Minutemen — incredible. Here's some guys that took Captain Beefheart and mixed it with Parliament-Funkadelic. For us (...) that was a mindblow, because we're comin' from arena rock. We thought there were these strict rules about music and stuff. Pop Group? They blew that all the way for us. You had permission to let the freak flag fuckin' fly. That's what they said to us. It was a really important band.

Primal Scream, Sonic Youth, Steve Albini of Big Black, A Certain Ratio, JG Thirlwell, Trent Reznor of Nine Inch Nails and Massive Attack, have also cited the Pop Group as an influence.

The Australian artist Nick Cave attended a gig of the Pop Group and was so inspired by their performance, he stated that: "...It was one of those moments we just feel the cogs of your mind shift and your life is going to be irreversibly changed forever." David J of Bauhaus named the group as one of the "few bands on the [post-punk] scene at the time to whom we related". American artist St. Vincent performed a cover of "She Is Beyond Good And Evil" on Late Night With Jimmy Fallon. The song also was a regular on her Strange Mercy Tour.

Outside of music, The Simpsons creator Matt Groening, is a fan of the band and instigated their return when he invited them to reform for All Tomorrow's Parties in 2010.

== Discography ==
=== Studio albums ===
- Y (1979)
- For How Much Longer Do We Tolerate Mass Murder? (1980)
- Citizen Zombie (2015)
- Honeymoon on Mars (2016)

=== Singles ===
- "She Is Beyond Good and Evil" (1979, Radar)
- "We Are All Prostitutes" (1979, Rough Trade) / (2016, Freaks R Us)
- "Where There's a Will There's a Way" (1980, Rough Trade/Y)
- "Citizen Zombie" (2015, Freaks R Us)
- "Mad Truth" (2015, Freaks R Us)
- "S.O.P.H.I.A." (2015, Freaks R Us)
- "Zipperface" (2016, Freaks R Us)
