= Mark Stewart (English musician) =

English singer (1960–2023)

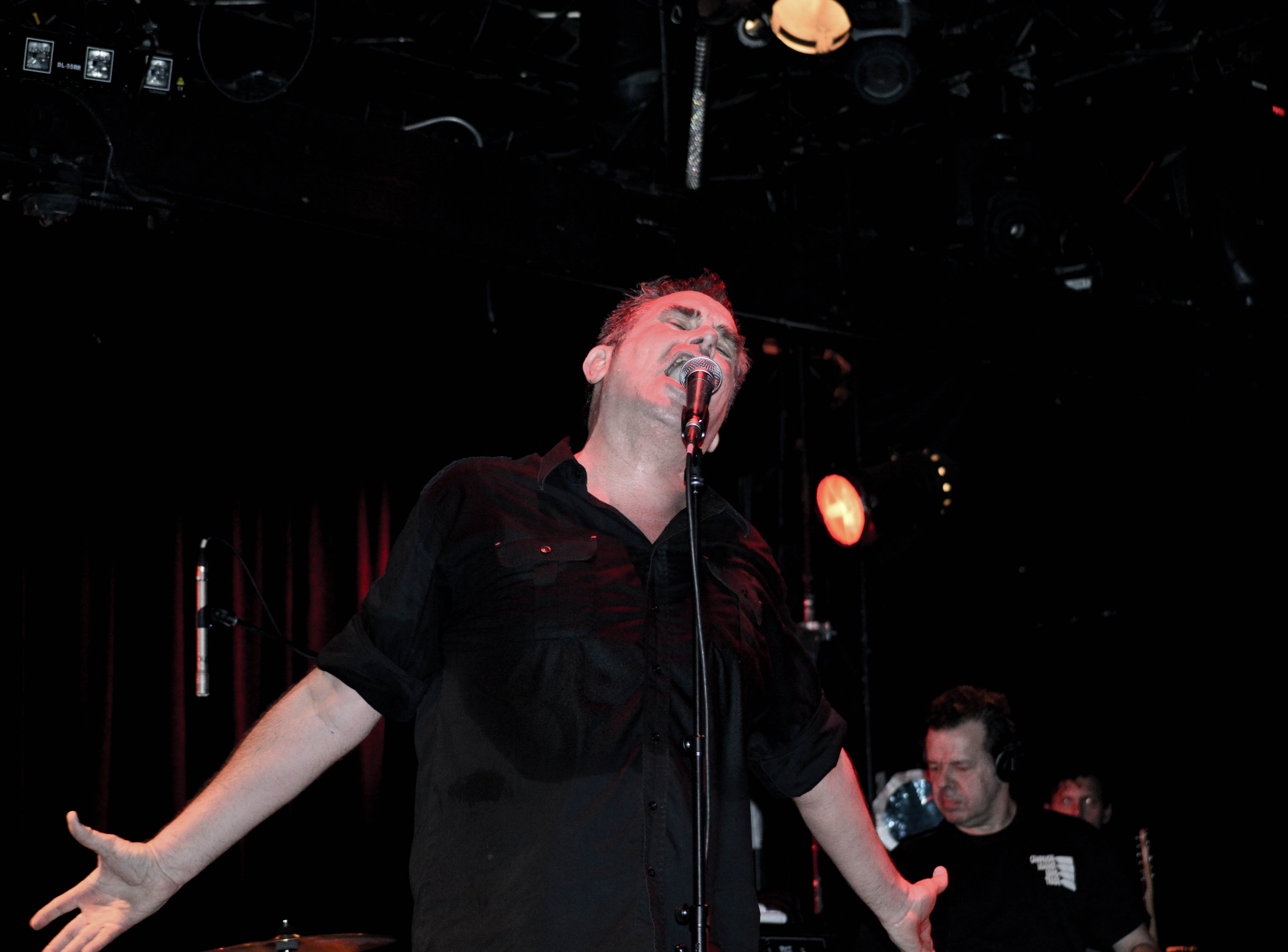
- Stewart performing in 2015 with the Pop Group

Background information
- Born: 10 August 1960; Bristol, England
- Died: 21 April 2023 (aged 62)
- Genres: Post-punk; avant-funk; industrial; dub
- Occupations: Singer, songwriter
- Years active: 1977–2023
- Labels: Mute Records, On-U Sound Records, Future Noise Music, eMERGENCY heARTS, Freaks R Us

Mark Stewart (10 August 1960 – 21 April 2023) was an English singer and founding member of the Pop Group. A pioneer of post-punk and industrial music, he recorded for On-U Sound Records, Mute Records, eMERGENCY heARTS, Future Noise Music, and Crippled Dick Hot Wax!

== Career ==
Stewart was educated at Bristol Grammar School, one of Bristol's private schools, and was in the same year as guitarist Nick Sheppard, who went on to play with the Clash and the Cortinas. Stewart began his music career in 1977 as a founder of the Pop Group, a band notable for sonic experimentation, political conviction and a willingness to collaborate.

The Pop Group split in 1981, with Stewart and two other members heading off to London to hook up with the emerging On-U Sound "conspiracy of outsiders" as part of the New Age Steppers. On-U became a focal point of a diverse set of networks – punks, reggae players from both the UK and Jamaica and free-jazzers. His first post-Pop Group release was as Mouth 2, the 1982 single "Who's Hot". Two releases followed with On-U associates under the name Mark Stewart & The Maffia – the Jerusalem EP in 1983, and the 1983 album Learning to Cope with Cowardice.

Stewart made several albums under his own name as well as collaborating with artists such as Trent Reznor of Nine Inch Nails fame, Tricky, Massive Attack, Chicks on Speed, ADULT., Algiers and Primal Scream. In 2005, he released a collection of his best work on Soul Jazz Records entitled Kiss the Future.

Stewart was well known in several European countries and Japan. He was involved in a documentary filmed by Tøni Schifer, "On/Off – Mark Stewart – from The Pop Group to the Maffia", which included interviews with Nick Cave, Daniel Miller, former Pop Group members, Adrian Sherwood, Skip McDonald, Doug Wimbish, Keith LeBlanc, Fritz Catlin (23 Skidoo) and others. The premiere took place at the East End Film Festival in April 2009.

Mark's work prompted Nick Cave to declare that, as a member of the Pop Group, Stewart "changed everything". Reflecting on his influence, Mark says, "I thought I was making funk music, but a track on Veneer of Democracy supposedly inspired all the American [Sic] industrialists, like Front Line Assembly and Skinny Puppy, while another track supposedly inspired the Bristol kids. It happens all the time. I've got this nonchalance that nothing is sacred so I'll crash a Slayer guitar line with Rotterdam gabba beats. For me, it's like colours. I grew up doing montages; like I did this collage of Ronald Reagan's head on this gay porno cowboy. In fact, I've never really grown up at all. I'm still trying to put round things into square holes."

In 2011, Stewart collaborated with New York-based artist-writer Rupert Goldsworthy, forming The New Banalists Orchestra, a collective featuring a host of artists and associates, including John Sinclair, Youth, David Tibet, Penny Rimbaud & Eve Libertine. Their sole output to date, entitled "Mammon", was released in 2011.

Stewart released his next solo single through Future Noise Music on Black Friday 25 November 2011. The double A-side "Children of the Revolution" / "Nothing Is Sacred" features The Bug, Crass's Eve Libertine, Berlin's Slope and Pop Group bassist Dan Catsis. This paved the way for Stewart's 2012 album, The Politics of Envy, released on 26 March 2012, also on Future Noise Music. Tackling mass media, modern capitalism and consumer apathy, it features a cast including Kenneth Anger, Lee 'Scratch' Perry, Richard Hell, The Raincoats' Gina Birch, Primal Scream, and Clash/PiL guitarist Keith Levene.

As well as music, Stewart has been involved in conceptual art. He collaborated once again with Rupert Goldsworthy on a show entitled "I AM THE LAW" displayed at Ritter/Zamet gallery in New York and London from January until March 2012. Dazed described the show as "an expo where found objects, wall paintings and scrawled writings come together in a ritualistic pile-on of references...an effort to explore cultural myths, symbols, signs and 'radical brands' – the power of representation, charged with dystopian views, prison gates and rioting crowds."

Stewart remained active in a number of other solo projects and collaborations. 2013 saw him write and contribute vocals to Primal Scream's "Culturecide", a track featured on More Light and in 2014 he produced and provided vocals for "Shame & Pain", a track which featured Thurston Moore and was collected on a Jeffrey Lee Pierce Sessions Project compilation.

The next year saw Stewart remix both "Space Junk" by The Membranes and "Death Trip To Tulsa" by the Mark Lanegan band whilst also providing vocals for "Schizoid Fairytale", a track by Jim Johnston. A couple of years later, in 2017, Stewart wrote several tracks for "London Town", an album released by ex-Sugarhill Gang and regular On-U Sound Records cohort Little Axe.

In 2018, Stewart remixed "Ndrangheta Allotment" by Meatraffle and wrote and featured on the track "Stratosphere Girl" on More Disco Songs About Love, the third LP from Los Angeles duo De Lux. He also featured on the track "Fight Fire With Fire" by Lay Llamas. In 2021, Stewart collaborated with Algiers on their Nun Gun project where he featured heavily on both the Mondo Decay and Stealth Empire (In Dub) albums. He collaborated with several artists in the mashup album VS, released in 2022. That same year, Stewart featured on the 12" vinyl EP "! WASTED !", released by tribal/industrial band Lampredonto on Italian cult label UR Suoni. Stewart sang lead vocals on the original version of the "! WASTED !" title-track, as well as producing a remix, entitled "Toxic Waste", along with Dutch producer and On-U Sound associate Uncle Fester On Acid (AKA Patrick Dokter).

Stewart's final solo album, The Fateful Symmetry, was released in 2025 on Mute Records. Politically-charged but relatively delicate, it was described by Cold War Night Life as "an album that gestures more than it declares."

== Death ==
Stewart died on 21 April 2023, at age 62.

== Solo discography ==
- Learning to Cope with Cowardice (1983)
- As the Veneer of Democracy Starts to Fade (1985)
- Mark Stewart (1987)
- Metatron (1990)
- Control Data (1996)
- Edit (2008)
- The Politics of Envy (2012)
- VS (2022, Emergency Hearts)
- The Fateful Symmetry (2025, Mute)
