= Ian Charleson Awards =

Awards for young British actors

- Type: Theatrical awards
- Awarded for: Actors under 30 in a classical play
- Country: United Kingdom
- Presented by: Sunday Times; National Theatre
- Status: Active
- Established: 1990

The Ian Charleson Awards are theatrical awards that reward the best classical stage performances in the UK by actors under age 30. The awards are named in memory of the British actor Ian Charleson, and are run by the Sunday Times newspaper and the National Theatre. The awards were established in 1990 after Charleson's death, and have been awarded annually since then. Sunday Times theatre critic John Peter (1938–2020) initiated the creation of the awards, particularly in memory of Charleson's extraordinary Hamlet, which he had performed shortly before his death. Recipients receive a cash prize, as do runners-up and third-place winners.

The awards' current definition of a classical play is one written before 1918. The awards for the previous year's performances are presented in the spring of the following year. The winners for 2025 performances were announced on 26 May 2026, and first prize went to Isis Hainsworth, for her performance as Isabella in Measure for Measure at the Royal Shakespeare Company.

== Background and description ==
The Sunday Times chief drama critic John Peter saw and reviewed Ian Charleson's extraordinary Hamlet at the National Theatre in late 1989. Unbeknownst to the audience, Charleson performed it during the last weeks of his life while he was seriously ill with AIDS, and died in January 1990 at the age of 40 eight weeks after his final performance. In November 1990, in memory of Charleson's fine performance, Peter established the annual Ian Charleson Award, to recognize and reward the best classical stage performance by an actor under age 30. The awards are jointly sponsored by The Sunday Times and the National Theatre, where they are held.

Upon founding the awards, Peter noted:

Classical work is the solid bedrock of all acting. It is classical acting, with its twin demands of psychological perception and formal excellence, which truly tests and proves the actor's ability and stamina, both physical and mental.

The first annual Ian Charleson Award was presented in January 1991. The awards initially defined a classic play as one written prior to 1900; by the awards for 1992 this parameter had been extended to plays written by 1904, the year of Chekhov's death; this cut-off was extended to 1918 at the awards for 2008. The awards are presented at a friendly, low-key private luncheon at one of the restaurants at the National Theatre. There is no filming and no outside press, and there are no acceptance speeches; the awards are attended however by Britain's theatre royalty, who take great interest in preserving the foundations of their profession. Guests of honour have included Alec Guinness, Paul Scofield, Ian McKellen, and Prince Charles.

Recipients receive a cash prize, as do runners-up and third-place winners. All shortlist nominees who are not cash-prize recipients receive a "commendation". Winners and commendees receive a plaque signed by the judges, who usually number four (a theatre critic, an actor, a casting director, and an artistic director) and until the awards for 2016 always included John Peter.

The awards for the previous year's performances are presented the following year, generally in the spring. The prize money is as follows: 1st prize £5,000; 2nd prize £1,500 (sometimes £2,000 or £2,500); and 3rd prize £500.

== 1990s ==
=== 1990 ===
==== First prize ====
- Ian Hughes, for Torquato Tasso in Torquato Tasso (Actors Touring Company)

==== Second prize ====
- Paterson Joseph, for Oswald in King Lear, Dumaine in Love's Labour's Lost, and the Marquis de Mota in The Last Days of Don Juan (Royal Shakespeare Company)

==== Special commendation ====
- Simon Russell Beale, for Konstantin in The Seagull, Thersites in Troilus and Cressida, and Edward II in Edward II (Royal Shakespeare Company)

==== Commendation ====
- Saskia Wickham, for Sonya in Uncle Vanya (Old Vic Theatre)

=== 1991 ===
==== First prize ====
- Joe Dixon, for Jacques in an all-male production of As You Like It (Cheek by Jowl)

==== Second prize ====
- Jennifer Ehle, for Orgon's wife in Tartuffe (Peter Hall Company)

==== Special commendation ====
- Iain Glen, for Hamlet in Hamlet (Old Vic, Bristol)

==== Commendations ====
- Adrian Lester, for Rosalind in an all-male production of As You Like It (Cheek by Jowl)
- Tom Hollander, for Celia in an all-male production of As You Like It (Cheek by Jowl)
- Hugh Bonneville (then known as Richard Bonneville), for Sir Samuel Hearty in The Virtuoso, Valentine in The Two Gentlemen of Verona, Bergetto in 'Tis Pity She's a Whore, and Kastril in The Alchemist (Royal Shakespeare Company)
- Caroline Quentin, for Masha in The Seagull (Oxford Theatre Company)

=== 1992 ===
==== First prize ====
- Tom Hollander, for Witwoud in The Way of the World (Lyric Hammersmith)

==== Second prize ====
- Toby Stephens, for Bertram in All's Well That Ends Well (Swan Theatre)

==== Special commendation ====
- Ian Hughes, for Reynaldo and Fortinbras in Hamlet (Barbican Theatre)

==== Commendations ====
- Mabel Aitken, for Sonia in Uncle Vanya (Lyceum Theatre, Edinburgh)
- Sophie Thursfield, for Nora in A Doll's House (Duke of Cambridge pub theatre, London)
- Nick Waring, for Konstantin in The Seagull (Theatr Clwyd)

=== 1993 ===
==== First prize ====
- Emma Fielding, for Agnes in The School for Wives (Almeida Theatre)

==== Second prize ====
- Mark Lockyer, for Stephano in The Tempest, Oswald in King Lear, and Gratiano in The Merchant of Venice (Royal Shakespeare Company)

==== Third prize ====
- Helen McCrory, for Rose Trelawny in Trelawny of the 'Wells' (National Theatre)

==== Commendations ====
- Adrian Scarborough, for Dromio of Syracuse in The Comedy of Errors (Royal Exchange Theatre, Manchester)
- Michael Sheen, for Perdican in Don't Fool With Love (Cheek by Jowl)
- Helen Baxendale for Marie Wesener in The Soldiers (Citizens Theatre, Glasgow)

=== 1994 ===
==== First prize ====
- Toby Stephens, for Coriolanus in Coriolanus (Royal Shakespeare Company)

==== Second prize ====
- Anastasia Hille, for Isabella in Measure For Measure (Cheek by Jowl)

==== Third prize ====
- Jude Law, for Ion in Ion (Royal Shakespeare Company)

==== Commendations ====
- Henry Ian Cusick, for Creon and The Messenger in Oedipus Rex (Citizens Theatre, Glasgow) and Torquato Tasso in Torquato Tasso (Royal Lyceum Theatre, Edinburgh)
- Marianne Jean-Baptiste, for Mistress Overdone and Mariana in Measure For Measure (Cheek by Jowl)
- Mark Bazeley, for Lucio in Measure For Measure (Cheek by Jowl)
- Guy Lankester, for Orsino in Twelfth Night (Bristol Old Vic)

=== 1995 ===
==== First prize ====
- Lucy Whybrow, for Eleanora in Easter (Royal Shakespeare Company)

==== Second prize ====
- Victoria Hamilton, for Hilde Wangel in The Master Builder (Peter Hall Company)

==== Third prize ====
- Catherine Russell, for Masha in Three Sisters (Out of Joint)

==== Commendations ====
- Paul Bettany, for Strato in Julius Caesar (Royal Shakespeare Company)
- Zubin Varla, for Romeo in Romeo and Juliet (Royal Shakespeare Company)
- Rakie Ayola, for Millamant in The Way of the World (Birmingham Rep)
- Alexandra Gilbreath, for Regan in King Lear (West Yorkshire Playhouse)
- John Light, for Philippe D'Aulnay in The Tower (Almeida Theatre)
- Julian Rhind-Tutt, for the Duke of Aumerle in Richard II (National Theatre)
- Benedick Bates, for Don Carlos in Don Carlos (Citizens Theatre, Glasgow)

=== 1996 ===
==== First prize ====
- Alexandra Gilbreath, for Hedda in Hedda Gabler (English Touring Theatre)

==== Second prize ====
- Derbhle Crotty, for Asta in Little Eyolf (Royal Shakespeare Company)

==== Third prize ====
- Damian Lewis, for Borghejm in Little Eyolf (Royal Shakespeare Company)

==== Special commendation ====
- Tom Hollander, for Tartuffe in Tartuffe (Almeida Theatre)

==== Commendations ====
- Ian Pepperell, for Hamlet in Hamlet (Oxford Stage Company)
- Carol Starks, for Mrs. Elvsted in Hedda Gabler (English Touring Theatre)
- Rebecca Johnson, for Lady Windermere in Lady Windermere's Fan (Royal Exchange Theatre, Manchester; Theatre Royal, Haymarket)
- Scott Handy, for Ferdinand in The Duchess of Malfi (Cheek by Jowl)

=== 1997 ===
==== First prize ====
- Mark Bazeley, for Konstantin in The Seagull (English Touring Theatre) (tie)
- Dominic West, for Konstantin in The Seagull (Peter Hall Company, Old Vic Theatre) (tie)

==== Second prize ====
- James Dreyfus, for Cassius in Julius Caesar (Birmingham Repertory Theatre)

==== Special commendations ====
- Michael Sheen, for Henry V in Henry V (Royal Shakespeare Company)
- Tom Hollander, for Khlestakov in The Government Inspector (Almeida Theatre)

==== Commendations ====
- Kate Ashfield, for Marie in Woyzeck (Gate Theatre)
- Toby Cockerell, for Katherine and the Boy in Henry V (Shakespeare's Globe)
- Dominic Curtis, for Orlando in As You Like It (Perth Theatre)
- Anne-Marie Duff, for Cordelia in King Lear (National Theatre)
- Ray Fearon, for Romeo in Romeo and Juliet (Royal Shakespeare Company)
- Zoe Waites, for Juliet in Romeo and Juliet (Royal Shakespeare Company)
- Victoria Hamilton, for Lady Brute in The Provok'd Wife (Peter Hall Company)
- Andrew Howard, for Orestes in Electra (Minerva Theatre, Chichester; Donmar Warehouse)
- Jason Hughes, for Pleribo, Adraste, and Prince Florilame in The Illusion (Royal Exchange Theatre, Manchester)
- Julia Sawalha, for Melibea, Isabelle, and Hippolyta in The Illusion (Royal Exchange Theatre, Manchester)
- Paul McEneany, for Mustardseed and Flute in A Midsummer Night's Dream (Lyric Theatre, Belfast)
- Lise Stevenson, for Isabella in Measure for Measure (Nottingham Playhouse)

=== 1998 ===
==== First prize ====
- Claudie Blakley, for Nina in The Seagull (West Yorkshire Playhouse)

==== Second prize ====
- Kevin McKidd, for Britannicus in Britannicus (Almeida Theatre)

==== Third prize ====
- Paul Hilton, for Orlando in As You Like It (Shakespeare's Globe)

==== Commendations ====
- Kathy Kiera Clarke, for Medea in Medea (Citizens Theatre, Glasgow)
- Hermione Gulliford, for Olivia in Twelfth Night (Crucible Theatre, Sheffield)
- Thusitha Jayasundera, for Viola in Twelfth Night (Young Vic)
- Susan Lynch, for Katerina in The Storm (Almeida Theatre)
- Stephen Mangan, for Don Pedro in Much Ado About Nothing (Cheek by Jowl), and Sir Benjamin Backbite in The School for Scandal (Royal Shakespeare Company)
- Matthew Macfadyen, for Benedick in Much Ado About Nothing (Cheek by Jowl), and Charles Surface in The School for Scandal (Royal Shakespeare Company)
- Jo McInnes, for Sonya in Uncle Vanya (Royal Shakespeare Company)
- David Oyelowo, for the King in The Suppliants (Gate Theatre)
- Kelly Reilly, for Peggy Riley in The London Cuckolds (National Theatre)

=== 1999 ===
==== First prize ====
- Rupert Penry-Jones, for Don Carlos in Don Carlos (Royal Shakespeare Company)

==== Second prize ====
- Gabrielle Jourdan, for Jessica in The Merchant of Venice (National Theatre)

==== Third prize ====
- Megan Dodds, for Ophelia in Hamlet (Young Vic)

==== Commendations ====
- Ariyon Bakare, for Florindo in The Servant of Two Masters (Royal Shakespeare Company, Young Vic)
- Emma Cunniffe, for Hilde in The Master Builder (English Touring Theatre)
- Jude Law, for Giovanni in 'Tis Pity She's a Whore (Young Vic)
- Aidan McArdle, for Rodrigo in Othello, and Puck in A Midsummer Night's Dream (Royal Shakespeare Company)
- Patrick Moy, for Malcolm in Macbeth (Royal Lyceum Theatre, Edinburgh)
- Kirsten Parker, for Viola in Twelfth Night (Theatr Clwyd)
- Claire Price, for Princess Eboli in Don Carlos (Royal Shakespeare Company)
- Iain Robertson, for Adam/Isaac/Shepherd in The Mysteries (National Theatre)

== 2000s ==
=== 2000 ===
==== First prize ====
- David Oyelowo, for Henry VI in Henry VI (Royal Shakespeare Company)

==== Second prize ====
- John Light, for Konstantin in The Seagull (Royal Shakespeare Company)

==== Third prize ====
- Zoe Waites, for Vittoria in The White Devil (Lyric Hammersmith)

==== Commendations ====
- Nancy Carroll, for Lady Percy in Henry VI, Part 1 (Royal Shakespeare Company)
- James O'Donnell, for Page and Ostler in Henry VI (Royal Shakespeare Company)
- Joe Renton, for Peto in Henry VI (Royal Shakespeare Company)
- Chiwetel Ejiofor, for Romeo in Romeo and Juliet (National Theatre)
- Martin Hutson, for Silvius in As You Like It (Crucible Theatre, Sheffield)
- Molly Innes, for Electra in Electra (Theatre Babel)
- Justine Waddell, for Nina in The Seagull (Royal Shakespeare Company)
- David Tennant, for Antipholus of Syracuse in The Comedy of Errors (RSC)
- Sam Troughton, for Young Talbot in Henry VI, Part 1 (Royal Shakespeare Company)

=== 2001 ===
==== First prize ====
- Claire Price, for Berinthia in The Relapse (National Theatre)

==== Second prize ====
- Zoe Waites, for Viola in Twelfth Night (Royal Shakespeare Company)

==== Third prize ====
- James D'Arcy, for Gaveston in Edward II (Crucible Theatre, Sheffield)

==== Commendations ====
- Claire Cox, for Portia in Julius Caesar (Royal Shakespeare Company)
- Benedict Cumberbatch, for the King of Navarre in Love's Labour's Lost (Regent's Park Open Air Theatre)
- August Diehl, for Konstantin The Seagull (Edinburgh Festival)
- John Hopkins, for Octavius in Julius Caesar (Royal Shakespeare Company)
- Johanna Wokalek, for Nina in The Seagull (Edinburgh Festival)
- Martin Hutson, for Oswald in Ghosts (Comedy Theatre)
- Gerald Kyd, for the King of Bavarre in Love's Labour's Lost (English Touring Theatre)
- Kevin Lennon, for Giovanni in 'Tis Pity She's a Whore (Theatre Babel, Glasgow)
- Kirsten Parker, for the Princess in Love's Labour's Lost (English Touring Theatre)
- Sam Troughton, for Richmond in Richard III (Royal Shakespeare Company)
- Zubin Varla, for Caliban in The Tempest (Royal Shakespeare Company)
- Kaye Wragg, for Sonya in Uncle Vanya (Royal Exchange Theatre, Manchester)

=== 2002 ===
==== First prize ====
- Rebecca Hall, for Vivvie in Mrs Warren's Profession (Strand Theatre)

==== Second prize ====
- Daniel Evans, for Ariel in The Tempest (Crucible Theatre, Sheffield) and Oswald in Ghosts (English Touring Theatre)

==== Third prize ====
- Iain Robertson, for Trinculo in The Tempest (Crucible Theatre, Sheffield)

==== Commendations ====
- Nonso Anozie, for King Lear in King Lear (Royal Shakespeare Company)
- Justin Avoth, for Demetrius in A Midsummer Night's Dream (Royal Exchange Theatre, Manchester)
- Lucy Black, for Olivia in Twelfth Night (Shakespeare at the Tobacco Factory, Bristol)
- Nancy Carroll, for Cordelia in King Lear (Almeida Theatre)
- Dan Fredenburgh, for the Prince in The Prince of Homburg (Royal Shakespeare Company)
- Naomi Frederick, for Irina in Three Sisters (Nuffield Theatre, Southampton)
- Ryan Kiggell, for Gloucester in King Lear (Royal Shakespeare Company)
- Kananu Kirimi, for Marina in Pericles (Royal Shakespeare Company)
- Claire Price, for Miranda in The Tempest (Crucible Theatre, Sheffield)
- Sam Troughton, for Valère in Tartuffe (National Theatre)

=== 2003 ===
==== First prize ====
- Lisa Dillon, for Hilda Wangel in The Master Builder (Almeida Theatre)

==== Second prize ====
- Louisa Clein, for Hilde in The Lady from the Sea (Almeida Theatre)

==== Third prize ====
- Eve Myles, for Lavinia in Titus Andronicus and Bianca in The Taming of the Shrew (Royal Shakespeare Company)

==== Special commendations ====
- Rebecca Hall, for Rosalind in As You Like It (Peter Hall Company)
- Felicite du Jeu, for Katherine in Henry V (National Theatre)

==== Commendations ====
- Jamie Beamish, for Sir Thurio in Two Gentlemen of Verona (Regent's Park Open Air Theatre)
- Kellie Bright, for Masha in The Seagull (Royal Exchange Theatre)
- Nancy Carroll, for Helena in A Midsummer Night's Dream (Crucible Theatre, Sheffield)
- Rory Kinnear, for Tranio in The Taming of the Shrew (Royal Shakespeare Company)
- Emma Lowndes, for Nina in The Seagull (Royal Exchange Theatre, Manchester)
- Tobias Menzies, for Tusenbach in Three Sisters (Playhouse Theatre)
- Joseph Millson, for Orlando in As You Like It (Peter Hall Company)
- Paul Ready, for Dromio of Syracuse in The Comedy of Errors (Bristol Old Vic)
- Steven Robertson, for Konstantin in The Seagull (Royal Exchange Theatre, Manchester)

=== 2004 ===
==== First prize ====
- Nonso Anozie, for Othello in Othello (Cheek by Jowl)

==== Second prize ====
- Naomi Frederick, for Isabella in Measure for Measure (Complicité at the National Theatre)

==== Third prize ====
- Ben Whishaw, for Hamlet in Hamlet (Old Vic)

==== Commendations ====
- Nikki Amuka-Bird, for Viola in Twelfth Night (Bristol Old Vic)
- Elliot Cowan, for Rodrigo, Marquis of Posa in Don Carlos (Crucible Theatre, Sheffield)
- Richard Glaves, for Marchbanks in Candida (Oxford Stage Company)
- Jake Harders, for Reverend Alexander Mill in Candida (Oxford Stage Company)
- Caroline Martin, for Desdemona in Othello (Cheek by Jowl)
- David Nicolle, for Ion in Ion (Mercury Theatre, Colchester)
- Matthew Rhys, for Edmund in King Lear (Royal Shakespeare Company)
- Dan Stevens, for Orlando in As You Like It (Peter Hall Company)

=== 2005 ===
==== First prize ====
- Mariah Gale, for Viola in Twelfth Night (Regent's Park Open Air Theatre), Annabella in Tis Pity She's a Whore (Southwark Playhouse), and Nurse Ludmilla and Klara in The Last Waltz (Arcola Theatre)

==== Second prize ====
- Sinead Matthews, for Hedvig in The Wild Duck (Donmar Warehouse), and Dolly in You Never Can Tell (Peter Hall Company)

==== Third prize ====
- Benedict Cumberbatch, for Tesman in Hedda Gabler (Almeida Theatre)

==== Commendations ====
- Peter Bramhill, for Lifter and Lady Vanity in Thomas More (Royal Shakespeare Company)
- Michelle Dockery, for Dina Dorf in Pillars of the Community (National Theatre)
- Edward Hogg, for Woyzeck in Woyzeck (Gate Theatre)
- Rory Kinnear, for Mortimer in Mary Stuart (Donmar Warehouse)
- James Loye, for Cloten in Cymbeline, and Sir Andrew Aguecheek in Twelfth Night (Regent's Park Open Air Theatre)
- Lyndsey Marshal, for Toinette in The Hypochondriac (Almeida Theatre)
- Caitlin Mottram, for Helena in A Midsummer Night's Dream (Royal Shakespeare Company)
- Nicholas Shaw, for Benjamin in Easter (Oxford Stage Company)

=== 2006 ===
==== First prize ====
- Andrea Riseborough, for Isabella in Measure For Measure and Miss Julie in Miss Julie (Peter Hall Company)

==== Second prize ====
- Catherine Hamilton, for Jessica in The Madras House (Orange Tree Theatre)

==== Third prize ====
- Hattie Morahan, for Nina in The Seagull (National Theatre)

==== Commendations ====
- Bryan Dick, for Dapper in The Alchemist (National Theatre)
- Trystan Gravelle, for Young Shepherd in A Winter's Tale (Royal Shakespeare Company)
- Tom Hiddleston, for Alsemero in The Changeling (Cheek by Jowl)
- Sally Leonard, for Lipochka in A Family Affair (Arcola Theatre)
- Laura Rees, for Lavinia in Titus Andronicus (Shakespeare's Globe)
- Amit Shah, for Abel Drugger in The Alchemist (National Theatre)
- Lex Shrapnel, for John, Talbot's son; Ghost of John Talbot; Henry, Earl of Richmond; and Son that killed his father in Henry VI (Royal Shakespeare Company)
- Ony Uhiara, for Marina in Pericles (Royal Shakespeare Company)
- Jodie Whittaker, for Nadya in Enemies (Almeida Theatre)

=== 2007 ===
==== First prize ====
- Rory Kinnear, for Pytor in Philistines and Sir Fopling Flutter in The Man of Mode (National Theatre)

==== Second prize ====
- Michelle Dockery, for Eliza Doolittle in Pygmalion (Peter Hall Company)

==== Third prize ====
- Tom Hiddleston, for Cassio in Othello (Donmar Warehouse)

==== Commendations ====
- Edward Bennett, for Dick Gurvil in Nan, Victor Bretherton in Diana of Dobson's (Orange Tree Theatre); Freddy in Pygmalion (Peter Hall Company); and Roderigo in Othello (Donmar Warehouse)
- Sam Crane, for Oswald in Ghosts (Bristol Old Vic), and Roderigo in Othello (Shakespeare's Globe)
- Gabriel Fleary, for Alonso in The Changling (English Touring Theatre)
- Harry Hadden-Paton, for Mercutio in Romeo and Juliet (Battersea Arts Centre), and John Worthing in The Importance of Being Earnest (Theatre Royal Bath)
- Daniel Hawksford, for Claudio in Much Ado About Nothing (National Theatre)
- John Heffernan, for Oswald in King Lear (Royal Shakespeare Company)
- Richard Madden, for Romeo in Romeo and Juliet (Shakespeare's Globe touring)
- Carey Mulligan, for Nina in The Seagull (Royal Court Theatre)
- Pippa Nixon, for Jessica in The Merchant of Venice (Shakespeare's Globe)
- Amy Noble, for Lily Wilson in Chains (Orange Tree Theatre)
- Claudia Renton, for Mabel Chiltern in An Ideal Husband (Royal Exchange Theatre, Manchester)
- Dominic Tighe, for the Tailor and the Widow in The Taming of the Shrew (Propeller at the Watermill)
- Tom Vaughan-Lawlor, for the Dauphin in Henry V (Royal Exchange Theatre, Manchester)

=== 2008 ===
==== First prize ====
- Tom Burke, for Adolph in Creditors (Donmar Warehouse)

==== Second prize ====
- Edward Bennett, for Hamlet in Hamlet, and Navarre in Love's Labour's Lost (Royal Shakespeare Company)

==== Third prize ====
- John Heffernan, for Stephen Undershaft in Major Barbara (National Theatre)

==== Special commendations ====
- Mariah Gale, for Ophelia in Hamlet (Royal Shakespeare Company)
- Tom Hiddleston, for Lvov in Ivanov (Donmar West End at Wyndhams Theatre)
- Andrea Riseborough, for Sasha in Ivanov (Donmar West End at Wyndhams Theatre)

==== Commendations ====
- Charles Aitken, for Iago in Othello (Frantic Assembly)
- David Ajala, for Reynaldo in Hamlet, and Cobweb in A Midsummer Night's Dream (Royal Shakespeare Company)
- Hayley Atwell, for Barbara in Major Barbara (National Theatre)
- Beth Cooke, for Irina in Three Sisters (Royal Exchange Theatre, Manchester)
- Tom Davey, for Laertes in Hamlet (Royal Shakespeare Company)
- Natalie Dew, for Viola in Twelfth Night (Regent's Park Open Air Theatre)
- Ryan Gage, for Flute in A Midsummer Night's Dream (Royal Shakespeare Company)
- Oliver Le Sueur, for Lucentio The Taming of the Shrew and Laertes in Hamlet (Shakespeare at the Tobacco Factory, Bristol)
- Gwilym Lee, for the Messenger in Oedipus (National Theatre)
- Ella Smith, for Jaquenetta in Love's Labour's Lost (Rose Theatre)
- Alex Waldmann, for Sebastian in Twelfth Night (Donmar West End at Wyndhams Theatre)

=== 2009 ===
==== First prize ====
- Ruth Negga, for Aricia in Phèdre (National Theatre)

==== Second prize ====
- Max Bennett, for Claudio in Measure for Measure (Theatre Royal, Plymouth) and Frank in Mrs Warren's Profession (Theatre Royal, Bath)

==== Third prize ====
- Natalie Dew, for Celia in As You Like It (Curve Theatre)

==== Special commendations as previous winners ====
- Mariah Gale, for Celia in As You Like It (Royal Shakespeare Company)
- Rebecca Hall, for Hermione in The Winter's Tale (Bridge Project at the Old Vic)

==== Commendations ====
- Hedydd Dylan, for Eliza Doolittle in Pygmalion (Clwyd Theatr Cymru)
- Tracy Ifeachor, for Rosalind in As You Like It (Curve Theatre)
- Max Irons, for Max Piccolomini in Wallenstein (Chichester Festival Theatre)
- Tunji Kasim, for Lucius and Romulus in Julius Caesar (Royal Shakespeare Company)
- Vanessa Kirby, for Regina in Ghosts (Octagon Theatre, Bolton)
- Keira Knightley, for Jennifer in The Misanthrope (Comedy Theatre)
- Jack Laskey, for Orlando in As You Like It (Shakespeare's Globe)
- Harry Lloyd, for Oswald in Ghosts (Arcola Theatre)
- John MacMillan, for Malcolm in Macbeth (Royal Exchange Theatre), and Rosencrantz in Hamlet (Wyndhams Theatre)
- David Ononokpono, for Orlando in As You Like It (Curve Theatre)
- Henry Pettigrew, for Marcellus and Second Gravedigger in Hamlet (Wyndhams Theatre)
- Prasanna Puwanarajah, for Messenger in Thyestes (Arcola Theatre)
- George Rainsford, for Bertram in All's Well That Ends Well (National Theatre)
- Sam Swainsbury, for Demetrius in A Midsummer Night's Dream, and Salerio in The Merchant of Venice (Propeller)
- Ellie Turner, for Agnes in The School for Wives (Upstairs at the Gatehouse)

== 2010s ==
=== 2010 ===
==== First prize ====
- Gwilym Lee, for Edgar in King Lear (Donmar Warehouse)

==== Second prize ====
- Zawe Ashton, for Salome in Salome (Headlong Theatre)

==== Third prize ====
- Vanessa Kirby, for Isabella in Women Beware Women (National Theatre), Rosalind in As You Like It (West Yorkshire Playhouse), and Helena in A Midsummer Night's Dream (Octagon Theatre)

==== Commendations ====
- Pippa Bennett-Warner, for Cordelia in King Lear (Donmar Warehouse)
- Natalie Dormer, for Mitzi in Sweet Nothings (Young Vic)
- Susannah Fielding, for Petra in An Enemy of the People (Crucible Theatre, Sheffield)
- Melody Grove, for Gwendolen in The Importance of Being Earnest (Royal Lyceum Theatre, Edinburgh)
- Cush Jumbo, for Eliza Doolittle in Pygmalion (Royal Exchange Theatre, Manchester)
- Ferdinand Kingsley, for Rosencrantz in Hamlet (National Theatre)
- James McArdle, for Malcolm in Macbeth (Shakespeare's Globe), and Aleksey in A Month in the Country (Chichester Festival Theatre)
- Jessica Raine, for Regina in Ghosts (Duchess Theatre)
- Catrin Stewart, for Hilde in The Lady from the Sea (Royal Exchange Theatre, Manchester)
- Joseph Timms, for John of Lancaster in Henry IV Parts 1 and 2 (Shakespeare's Globe)
- Charity Wakefield, for Lydio Languish in The Rivals (Southwark Playhouse)
- Ashley Zhangazha, for the King of France in King Lear (Donmar Warehouse)

=== 2011 ===
==== First prize ====
- Cush Jumbo, for Rosalind in As You Like It (Royal Exchange Theatre, Manchester)

==== Second prize ====
- Damien Molony, for Giovanni in 'Tis Pity She's a Whore (West Yorkshire Playhouse)

==== Third prize ====
- Jodie McNee, for Masha in The Seagull (Arcola Theatre)

==== Commendations ====
- Hiran Abeysekera, for Valère in Tartuffe (English Touring Theatre)
- Jade Anouka, for Ophelia in Hamlet (Shakespeare's Globe)
- Mark Arends, for Malcolm in Macbeth (Liverpool Everyman)
- Sebastian Armesto, for Wendoll in A Woman Killed with Kindness (National Theatre)
- John Heffernan, for Richard II in Richard II (Shakespeare at the Tobacco Factory)
- Ffion Jolly, for Luciana in The Comedy of Errors (Shakespeare at the Tobacco Factory)
- Ben Mansfield, for Sebastian in Twelfth Night (National Theatre)
- Sam Marks, for Friar Peter, Froth, and Gentleman 2 in Measure for Measure (Royal Shakespeare Company)
- Matthew Needham, for Nero in Britannicus (Wilton's Music Hall)
- Eddie Redmayne, for Richard II in Richard II (Donmar Warehouse)
- Lara Rossi, for Myrrha and Macrina in Emperor and Galilean (National Theatre)
- Sara Vickers, for Annabella in 'Tis Pity She's a Whore (West Yorkshire Playhouse)

=== 2012 ===
==== First prize ====
- Ashley Zhangazha, for Ross in Macbeth (Crucible Theatre, Sheffield)

==== Second prize ====
- Amy Morgan, for Margery Pinchwife in The Country Wife (Royal Exchange Theatre, Manchester)

==== Third prize ====
- Lara Rossi, for Dol Common in The Alchemist (Liverpool Playhouse)

==== Commendations ====
- Jade Anouka, for Calpurnia, Metellus Cimber, and Pindarus in Julius Caesar (Donmar Warehouse)
- Alys Daroy, for Yelena in The Wood Demon (Theatre Collection)
- Holly Earl, for Bertha in The Father (Belgrade Theatre, Coventry)
- Kurt Egyiawan, for Arsace in Berenice (Donmar Warehouse)
- Paapa Essiedu, for Fenton in The Merry Wives of Windsor (Royal Shakespeare Company)
- Johnny Flynn, for Viola in Twelfth Night (Shakespeare's Globe and West End)
- Aysha Kala, for Maid in Much Ado About Nothing (Royal Shakespeare Company)
- Vanessa Kirby, for Masha in Three Sisters (Young Vic)
- Simon Manyonda, for Lucius in Julius Caesar (Royal Shakespeare Company)
- Luke Norris, for The Soldier in Antigone (National Theatre)
- Ailish Symons, for Cecily in The Importance of Being Earnest (Lyric Theatre, Belfast)
- Ellie Turner, for Fanny Hawthorn in Hindle Wakes (Finborough Theatre)

=== 2013 ===
==== First prize ====
- Jack Lowden, for Oswald in Ghosts (Almeida Theatre)

==== Second prize ====
- Jessie Buckley, for Miranda in The Tempest (Shakespeare's Globe) and Princess Katharine in Henry V (Noël Coward Theatre)

==== Third prize ====
- Graham Butler, for Henry VI in Henry VI, Parts I, II & III (Shakespeare's Globe)

==== Commendations ====
- Fisayo Akinade, for Adam, Silvius, and William in As You Like It (Transport Theatre on tour)
- Elliot Barnes-Worrell, for the Groom in Richard II (Royal Shakespeare Company)
- Nari Blair-Mangat, for Caithness in Macbeth (Manchester International Festival)
- Gavin Fowler, for Puck in A Midsummer Night's Dream (Noël Coward Theatre) and Florizel in The Winter's Tale (Royal Shakespeare Company)
- Kim Hardy, for Konstantin in The Seagull (The White Bear)
- Brian Markey, for Hugh in Mixed Marriage (Lyric Theatre, Belfast)
- Charlene McKenna, for Regina in Ghosts (Almeida Theatre)
- Rose Reynolds, for Lavinia in Titus Andronicus (Royal Shakespeare Company)
- Gemma Soul, for Rose in The Recruiting Officer (Salisbury Playhouse)
- Luke Thompson, for Lysander in A Midsummer Night's Dream (Shakespeare's Globe)
- Olivia Vinall, for Desdemona in Othello (National Theatre)

=== 2014 ===
==== First prize ====
- Susannah Fielding, for Portia in The Merchant of Venice (Almeida Theatre)

==== Second prize ====
- Tom Mothersdale, for Yasha in The Cherry Orchard (Young Vic)

==== Third prize ====
- Cynthia Erivo, for Poins and Earl of Douglas in Henry IV (Donmar Warehouse)

==== Commendations ====
- Stefano Braschi, for Soranzo in 'Tis Pity She's a Whore (Sam Wanamaker Playhouse, Shakespeare's Globe)
- Rebecca Collingwood, for Blanche in Widowers' Houses (Orange Tree Theatre)
- Ncuti Gatwa, for Mercutio in Romeo and Juliet (HOME, Manchester)
- Emma Hall, for Phaedra, Aphrodite, and Artemis in Hippolytos (Antic Face, at The Colepit)
- Jennifer Kirby, for Lady Percy in Henry IV Parts 1 and 2 (Royal Shakespeare Company)
- Daisy May, for Celia in As You Like It (Tobacco Factory Theatre, Bristol)
- Frances McNamee, for Finea in A Lady of Little Sense (Theatre Royal, Bath)
- Ekow Quartey, for Hans in Spring Awakening (touring production by Headlong/West Yorkshire Playhouse/Nuffield Theatre)
- Michael Shelford, for Willie Mossop in Hobson's Choice (Octagon Theatre, Bolton)
- Thalissa Teixeira, for Chorus in Electra (Old Vic)

=== 2015 ===
==== First prize ====
- James McArdle, for Platonov in Platonov (Chichester Festival Theatre)

==== Second prize ====
- Elliot Barnes-Worrell, for Straker in Man and Superman (National Theatre)

==== Third prize ====
- Freddie Fox, for Romeo in Romeo and Juliet (Sheffield Crucible)

==== Commendations ====
- Joel MacCormack, for Orestes in The Oresteia (Shakespeare's Globe)
- Ken Nwosu, for Silvius in As You Like It (National Theatre)
- Jack Colgrave Hirst, for Clown in The Winter's Tale (Kenneth Branagh Theatre Company at the Garrick Theatre)
- Joshua James, for Konstantin in The Seagull and Nikolai in Platonov (Chichester Festival Theatre)
- Emily Barber, for Imogen in Cymbeline (Shakespeare's Globe)
- Jenny Rainsford, for Miss Prue in Love for Love (Royal Shakespeare Company)
- Jessica Baglow, for Marina in Pericles (Shakespeare's Globe)
- Jessica Brown Findlay, for Elektra in The Oresteia (Almeida Theatre and Trafalgar Studios)

=== 2016 ===
==== First prize ====
- Paapa Essiedu, for Hamlet in Hamlet and Edmund in King Lear (Royal Shakespeare Company)

==== Second prize ====
- Jessica Brown Findlay, for Sonya in Uncle Vanya (Almeida Theatre)

==== Third prize ====
- Fisayo Akinade, for The Dauphin in Saint Joan (Donmar Warehouse)

==== Commendations ====
- James Corrigan, for Palamon in The Two Noble Kinsmen (Royal Shakespeare Company)
- Emma Curtis, for The Lady in Comus (Shakespeare's Globe)
- Marcus Griffiths, for Laertes in Hamlet (Royal Shakespeare Company)
- Felicity Huxley-Miners, for Elena Popova in The Bear (The London Theatre – New Cross)
- Francesca Mills, for Maria in The Government Inspector (Birmingham Repertory Theatre)
- Marc Rhys, for Christian in Cyrano de Bergerac (Theatr Clwyd)
- Natalie Simpson, for Cordelia in King Lear, Ophelia in Hamlet, and Guideria in Cymbeline (Royal Shakespeare Company)
- Ewan Somers, for Claudio in Much Ado About Nothing (Dundee Repertory Theatre)
- Marli Siu, for Hero in Much Ado About Nothing (Dundee Repertory Theatre)
- Joanna Vanderham, for Queen Anne in Richard III (Almeida Theatre)
- Paksie Vernon, for Sylvia Craven in The Philanderer (Orange Tree Theatre)

=== 2017 ===
==== First prize ====
- Natalie Simpson, for Duchess Rosaura in The Cardinal (Southwark Playhouse)

==== Second prize ====
- Tamara Lawrance, for Viola in Twelfth Night (National Theatre)

==== Third prize ====
- Ellie Bamber, for Hilde in The Lady from the Sea (Donmar Warehouse)

==== Commendations ====
- Daniel Ezra, for Sebastian in Twelfth Night (National Theatre)
- Rebecca Lee, for Friar Laurence in Romeo and Juliet (Watermill Theatre, Newbury)
- James Corrigan, for Mark Antony in Julius Caesar (Royal Shakespeare Company)
- Ned Derrington, for Lysander in A Midsummer Night's Dream (Shakespeare's Globe)
- Sope Dirisu, for Coriolanus in Coriolanus (Royal Shakespeare Company)
- Arthur Hughes, for Lucius in Julius Caesar (Sheffield Crucible)
- Douggie McMeekin, for Snug in A Midsummer Night's Dream (Young Vic)
- Hannah Morrish, for Lavinia in Titus Andronicus (Royal Shakespeare Company)

=== 2018 ===
==== First prize ====
- Bally Gill, for Romeo in Romeo and Juliet (Royal Shakespeare Company)

==== Second prize ====
- Hannah Morrish, for Octavia in Antony and Cleopatra (National Theatre)

==== Third prize ====
- Luke Newberry, for Malcolm in Macbeth (Royal Shakespeare Company)

==== Commendations ====
- Daniel Burke, for Diomed in Troilus and Cressida (Royal Shakespeare Company)
- Heledd Gwynn, for Katharine and Dauphin in Henry V (Tobacco Factory Theatre, Bristol)
- Tyrone Huntley, for Lysander in A Midsummer Night's Dream (Watermill Theatre, Newbury)
- Martins Imhangbe, for Bagot and Aumerle in Richard II (Almeida Theatre)
- Toheeb Jimoh, for Demetrius in A Midsummer Night's Dream (Crucible Theatre, Sheffield)
- Aaron Pierre, for Cassio in Othello (Shakespeare's Globe)
- Ellora Torchia, for Emilia in Two Noble Kinsmen (Shakespeare's Globe)
- Helena Wilson, for Mariana in Measure for Measure (Donmar Warehouse)

=== 2019 ===
==== First prize ====
- Heledd Gwynn, for Hedda in Hedda Gabler (Sherman Theatre, Cardiff) and Hastings and Ratcliffe in Richard III (Headlong)

==== Second prize ====
- Hammed Animashaun, for Bottom in A Midsummer Night's Dream (Bridge Theatre)

==== Third prize ====
- Ronke Adekoluejo, for Abosede in Three Sisters (National Theatre)

==== Commendations ====
- Kitty Archer, for Mariane in Tartuffe (National Theatre)
- Eben Figueiredo, for Christian in Cyrano de Bergerac (Jamie Lloyd Company at the Playhouse Theatre)
- Isis Hainsworth, for Hermia in A Midsummer Night's Dream (Bridge Theatre)
- Ebony Jonelle, for Rosalind in As You Like It (National Theatre Public Acts at the Queen's Theatre, Hornchurch)
- Ioanna Kimbook, for Cariola in The Duchess of Malfi (Almeida Theatre)
- Racheal Ofori, for Udo in Three Sisters (National Theatre)
- Billy Postlethwaite, for Macbeth in Macbeth (Watermill Theatre)
- Ekow Quartey, for Lysander in A Midsummer Night's Dream (Shakespeare's Globe)
- Kit Young, for Lysander in A Midsummer Night's Dream (Bridge Theatre)

== 2020s ==
=== 2020/2021 ===
==== First prize ====
- Gloria Obianyo, for Neoptolemus in Kae Tempest's Paradise (National Theatre)

==== Second prize ====
- Aimee Lou Wood, for Sonya in Uncle Vanya (Harold Pinter Theatre)

==== Third prize ====
- Lorn Macdonald, for Segismundo in Life Is a Dream (Royal Lyceum Theatre, Edinburgh)

==== Commendations ====
- Jonathan Ajayi, for Laertes in Hamlet (Young Vic)
- Norah Lopez Holden, for Ophelia in Hamlet (Young Vic)
- Baker Mukasa, for Angelo in The Comedy of Errors (Royal Shakespeare Company)
- Rebekah Murrell, for Juliet in Romeo and Juliet (Shakespeare's Globe)
- Anna Russell-Martin, for Rosaura in Life Is a Dream (Royal Lyceum Theatre, Edinburgh)
- Josh Zaré, for Claudio in Measure for Measure (Shakespeare's Globe)

=== 2022 ===
==== First prize ====
- Abiola Owokoniran, for Algernon Moncrieff in The Importance of Being Earnest (English Touring Theatre)

==== Second prize ====
- William Robinson, for Nero in Britannicus (Lyric Hammersmith)

==== Third Prize ====
- Rosy McEwen, for Desdemona in Othello (National Theatre)

==== Commendations ====
- Rose Ayling-Ellis, for Celia in As You Like It (@sohoplace)
- Ralph Davis, for Benedick in Much Ado About Nothing (Shakespeare's Globe)
- Eben Figueiredo, for Claudio in Much Ado About Nothing (National Theatre)
- Conor Glean, for Dick the Butcher in Henry VI: Rebellion, Young Clifford in Henry VI: War of the Roses, and Murderer 2 in Richard III (Royal Shakespeare Company)
- Phoebe Horn, for Margaret in Much Ado About Nothing (National Theatre)
- Mirren Mack, for Ophelia in Hamlet (Bristol Old Vic)
- Daniel Rock, for King Richard II in Richard II (Omnibus Theatre)
- Rosie Sheehy, for Lady Anne Neville in Richard III and Helena in All's Well That Ends Well (Royal Shakespeare Company)
- Chanel Waddock, for Desdemona in Othello (Frantic Assembly)
- Claire Wetherall, for Hero in Much Ado About Nothing (Sheffield Theatres/Ramps on the Moon)
- Benjamin Wilson, for Borachio in Much Ado About Nothing (Sheffield Theatres/Ramps on the Moon)

=== 2023 ===
==== First prize ====
- Francesca Mills, for Hermia in A Midsummer Night's Dream (Shakespeare's Globe)

==== Second prize ====
- Toheeb Jimoh, for Romeo in Romeo and Juliet (Almeida Theatre)

==== Third prize ====
- Joseph Payne, for Ferdinand in The Tempest (Royal Shakespeare Company). and Malcolm in Macbeth (Shakespeare's Globe)

==== Commendations ====
- Shyvonne Ahmmad, for Malcolm in Macbeth (Royal Shakespeare Company)
- Jonathan Case, for Seyton in Macbeth (Wessex Grove/Underbelly Touring)
- Joséphine Callies, for Katherine and Boy in Henry V (Shakespeare's Globe and Headlong)
- Samuel Creasey, for Young Shepherd in The Winter's Tale (Shakespeare's Globe, Sam Wanamaker Playhouse)
- Amber James, for Imogen in Cymbeline and Liz Bridges in The Fair Maid of the West (Royal Shakespeare Company)
- Shalisha James-Davis, for Juliet in Romeo & Juliet (Royal Exchange Theatre)
- Tyreke Leslie, for Player in As You Like It (Royal Shakespeare Company)
- Taheen Modak, for Freddy in Pygmalion (Old Vic)
- Danielle Phillips, for Luce / Second Merchant / Messenger in The Comedy of Errors (Shakespeare's Globe)
- Anna Russell-Martin, for Banquo in Macbeth (Royal Shakespeare Company)
- Kibong Tanji, for Aaron in Titus Andronicus (Shakespeare's Globe, Sam Wanamaker Playhouse)

=== 2024 ===
==== First prize ====
- Francesca Amewudah-Rivers, for Juliet in Romeo and Juliet (Duke of York's Theatre)

==== Second prize ====
- Ralph Davis, for Iago in Othello (Shakespeare's Globe)

==== Third prize ====
- Éanna Hardwicke, for Epikhodov in The Cherry Orchard (Donmar Warehouse)

==== Special commendation ====
- Francesca Mills, for the Duchess in The Duchess of Malfi (Shakespeare's Globe)

==== Commendations ====
- Melanie-Joyce Bermudez, for the Princess of France in Love's Labour's Lost (Royal Shakespeare Company)
- Tom Glenister, for Torvald in A Doll's House (Crucible Theatre, Sheffield)
- Madeleine Gray, for Sonya in Uncle Vanya (Orange Tree Theatre)
- Oli Higginson, for Cassio in Othello (Shakespeare's Globe)
- Nadeem Islam, for the messenger in Antony and Cleopatra (Shakespeare's Globe)
- Siena Kelly, for Nora in A Doll's House (Crucible Theatre, Sheffield)
- Daniel Quinn-Toye, for Paris in Romeo and Juliet (Duke of York's Theatre)
- Andrew Richardson, for Rostrov in Uncle Vanya (Orange Tree Theatre), and Oberon and Theseus in A Midsummer Night's Dream (Barbican Centre)
- Rumi Sutton, for Cecily in The Importance of Being Earnest (Royal Exchange Theatre)

=== 2025 ===
==== First prize ====
- Isis Hainsworth, for Isabella in Measure for Measure (Royal Shakespeare Company)

==== Second prize ====
- Stuart Thompson, for Andrei Prozorov in Three Sisters (Shakespeare's Globe)

==== Third prize ====
- Mason Alexander Park, for Ariel in The Tempest and Margaret in Much Ado About Nothing (Theatre Royal Drury Lane)

==== Special commendation ====
- Francesca Mills, for Ophelia in Hamlet (National Theatre)

==== Commendations ====
- Daniel Adeosun, for Claudio in Much Ado About Nothing (Royal Shakespeare Company)
- Rawaed Asde, for Romeo in Romeo and Juliet (Shakespeare's Globe)
- Ned Costello, for Bassianus and Publius in Titus Andronicus (Royal Shakespeare Company)
- Imogen Elliott, for Phebe in As You Like It (Theatre Royal Bath)
- Kitty Hawthorne, for Gwendolen Fairfax in The Importance of Being Earnest, (National Theatre, Noël Coward Theatre)
- Kasper Hilton-Hille, for Troilus in Troilus and Cressida (Shakespeare's Globe)
- Kyle Ndukuba, for Romeo in Romeo and Juliet (Bristol Old Vic, Hackney Empire, Belgrade Theatre)
- Harmony Rose-Bremner, for Nina in The Seagull (Royal Lyceum Theatre, Chichester Festival Theatre)
- Nia Towle, for Ophelia in Hamlet (Royal Shakespeare Company)

== Judges ==
=== 1990s ===
==== 1990 ====
- John Peter – Sunday Times drama critic
- Ian Brown – drama director of the Arts Council of Great Britain
- Sylvia Syms – actress

==== 1991 ====
- John Peter – Sunday Times drama critic
- Ian Brown – drama director of the Arts Council of Great Britain
- Sylvia Syms – actress

==== 1992 ====
- John Peter – Sunday Times drama critic
- Ian Brown – drama director of the Arts Council of Great Britain
- Sylvia Syms – actress

==== 1993 ====
- John Peter – Sunday Times drama critic
- Jane Lapotaire – actress
- Nicholas Wright – playwright and director

==== 1994 ====
- Serena Hill – National Theatre casting director
- Jane Lapotaire – actress
- Nicholas Wright – National Theatre associate director
- John Peter – Sunday Times drama critic

==== 1995 ====
- Serena Hill – National Theatre casting director
- Jane Lapotaire – actress
- Nicholas Wright – National Theatre associate director
- John Peter – Sunday Times drama critic

==== 1996 ====
- Jane Lapotaire – actress
- Serena Hill – National Theatre casting director
- John Peter – Sunday Times drama critic

==== 1997 ====
- Peter Gill – playwright and director
- Serena Hill – National Theatre casting director
- John Peter – Sunday Times drama critic

==== 1998 ====
- Penelope Wilton – actress
- Peter Gill – playwright and director
- Wendy Spon – National Theatre deputy casting director
- John Peter – Sunday Times drama critic

==== 1999 ====
(unpublished)

=== 2000s ===
==== 2000 ====
- Penelope Wilton – actress
- Peter Gill – playwright and director
- Wendy Spon – National Theatre deputy casting director
- John Peter – Sunday Times drama critic

==== 2001 ====
- Penelope Wilton – actress
- Howard Davies – National Theatre associate director
- John Peter – Sunday Times drama critic

==== 2002 ====
- Eileen Atkins – actress
- Howard Davies – National Theatre associate director
- Gabrielle Dawes – National Theatre casting director
- Hannah Miller – National Theatre casting director
- John Peter – Sunday Times drama critic

==== 2003 ====
- Lindsay Posner – director
- Penny Downie – actress
- Toby Whale – head of casting at the National Theatre
- John Peter – Sunday Times drama critic

==== 2004 ====
(unpublished)

==== 2005 ====
- Francesca Annis – actress
- Lindsay Posner – director
- Toby Whale – National Theatre casting director
- John Peter – Sunday Times drama critic

==== 2006 ====
- Francesca Annis – actress
- Lindsay Posner – director
- Toby Whale – National Theatre casting director
- John Peter – Sunday Times drama critic

==== 2007 ====
- Penny Downie – actress
- Michael Grandage – director
- Wendy Spon – National Theatre casting director
- John Peter – Sunday Times drama critic

==== 2008 ====
(unpublished)

==== 2009 ====
- Wendy Spon – National Theatre head of casting
- Geraldine James – actress
- Michael Grandage – director
- John Peter – Sunday Times drama critic

=== 2010s ===
==== 2010 ====
- Geraldine James – actress
- Michael Grandage – director
- Alastair Coomer – National Theatre casting director
- John Peter – Sunday Times drama critic

==== 2011 ====
(unpublished)

==== 2012 ====
- Michael Grandage – director
- Geraldine James – actress
- Wendy Spon – National Theatre head of casting
- John Peter – former Sunday Times drama critic

==== 2013 ====
- Michael Grandage – director
- Francesca Annis – actress
- Wendy Spon – National Theatre head of casting
- John Peter – former Sunday Times drama critic

==== 2014 ====
- Michael Grandage – director
- Francesca Annis – actress
- Wendy Spon – National Theatre head of casting
- John Peter – former Sunday Times drama critic

==== 2015 ====
- Michael Grandage – director
- Deborah Findlay – actress
- Wendy Spon – National Theatre head of casting
- John Peter – former Sunday Times drama critic

==== 2016 ====
- Michael Grandage – director
- Deborah Findlay – actress
- Wendy Spon – National Theatre head of casting

==== 2017 ====
- Michael Grandage – director
- Deborah Findlay – actress
- Wendy Spon – National Theatre head of casting

==== 2018 ====
- Michael Grandage – director
- Deborah Findlay – actress
- Wendy Spon – National Theatre head of casting
- Kate Bassett – The Times theatre critic and literary associate at Chichester Festival Theatre

==== 2019 ====
- Lyndsey Turner – director
- Deborah Findlay – actress
- Alastair Coomer – casting director
- Kate Bassett – The Times theatre critic and literary associate at Chichester Festival Theatre

=== 2020s ===
==== 2020/2021 ====
- Emma Fielding – actress
- Ashley Zhangazha – actor
- Alastair Coomer – National Theatre casting director
- Kate Bassett – former theatre critic at The Times

==== 2022 ====
- Emma Fielding – actress
- Ashley Zhangazha – actor
- Alastair Coomer – National Theatre casting director
- Robert Hastie – artistic director of Sheffield Theatres

==== 2023 ====
- Emma Fielding – actress
- Ashley Zhangazha – actor
- Alastair Coomer – National Theatre casting director
- Robert Hastie – artistic director of Sheffield Theatres

==== 2024 ====
- Fisayo Akinade – actor
- Alastair Coomer – head of casting at National Theatre
- Robert Hastie – deputy artistic director of National Theatre
- Hannah Miller – casting director

==== 2025 ====
- Fisayo Akinade – actor
- Malcolm Sinclair - actor
- Niamh Cusack - actress
- Alastair Coomer – head of casting at National Theatre
- Robert Hastie – deputy artistic director of National Theatre
- Hannah Miller – casting director

== See also ==
- List of Ian Charleson Award winners
- Sam Wanamaker Prize
