= List of Ian Charleson Award winners =

The Ian Charleson Award is a British theatrical award that rewards the best classical stage performance in Britain by an actor under age 30. The award's current definition of a classical play is one written before 1918.

The Ian Charleson Award is named in memory of the renowned British actor Ian Charleson, and is run by the Sunday Times newspaper and the National Theatre. The award was established in 1990 after Charleson's death, and has been presented annually since then. Recipients receive a cash prize.

The award for the previous year's performance is presented the following year. The first annual Ian Charleson Award, for a 1990 performance, was presented in January 1991.

== 1990s ==
- Ian Hughes (1990), for Torquato Tasso in Torquato Tasso (Actors Touring Company)
- Joe Dixon (1991), for Jacques in an all-male production of As You Like It (Cheek by Jowl)
- Tom Hollander (1992), for Witwoud in The Way of the World (Lyric Hammersmith)
- Emma Fielding (1993), for Agnes in The School for Wives (Almeida Theatre)
- Toby Stephens (1994), for Coriolanus in Coriolanus (Royal Shakespeare Company)
- Lucy Whybrow (1995), for Eleanora in Easter (Royal Shakespeare Company)
- Alexandra Gilbreath (1996), for Hedda in Hedda Gabler (English Touring Theatre)
- Mark Bazeley (1997) (tie), for Konstantin in The Seagull (English Touring Theatre)
- Dominic West (1997) (tie), for Konstantin in The Seagull (Peter Hall Company, Old Vic Theatre)
- Claudie Blakley (1998), for Nina in The Seagull (West Yorkshire Playhouse)
- Rupert Penry-Jones (1999), for Don Carlos in Don Carlos (Royal Shakespeare Company)

== 2000s ==
- David Oyelowo (2000), for Henry VI in Henry VI (Royal Shakespeare Company)
- Claire Price (2001), for Berinthia in The Relapse (National Theatre)
- Rebecca Hall (2002), for Vivvie in Mrs Warren's Profession (Strand Theatre)
- Lisa Dillon (2003), for Hilda Wangel in The Master Builder (Almeida Theatre)
- Nonso Anozie (2004), for Othello in Othello (Cheek by Jowl)
- Mariah Gale (2005), for Viola in Twelfth Night (Regent's Park Open Air Theatre), Annabella in Tis Pity She's a Whore (Southwark Playhouse), and Nurse Ludmilla and Klara in The Last Waltz (Arcola Theatre)
- Andrea Riseborough (2006), for Isabella in Measure for Measure and Miss Julie in Miss Julie (Peter Hall Company)
- Rory Kinnear (2007), for Pytor in Philistines and Sir Fopling Flutter in The Man of Mode (National Theatre)
- Tom Burke (2008), for Adolph in Creditors (Donmar Warehouse)
- Ruth Negga (2009), for Aricia in Phèdre (National Theatre)

== 2010s ==
- Gwilym Lee (2010), for Edgar in King Lear (Donmar Warehouse)
- Cush Jumbo (2011), for Rosalind in As You Like It (Royal Exchange Theatre, Manchester)
- Ashley Zhangazha (2012), for Ross in Macbeth (Crucible Theatre, Sheffield)
- Jack Lowden (2013), for Oswald in Ghosts (Almeida Theatre)
- Susannah Fielding (2014), for Portia in The Merchant of Venice (Almeida Theatre)
- James McArdle (2015), for Platonov in Platonov (Chichester Festival Theatre)
- Paapa Essiedu (2016), for in Hamlet in Hamlet and Edmund in King Lear (Royal Shakespeare Company)
- Natalie Simpson (2017), for Duchess Rosaura in The Cardinal (Southwark Playhouse)
- Bally Gill (2018), for Romeo in Romeo and Juliet (Royal Shakespeare Company)
- Heledd Gwynn (2019), for Hedda in Hedda Gabler (Sherman Theatre, Cardiff) and Hastings and Ratcliffe in Richard III (Headlong)

== 2020s ==
- Gloria Obianyo (2020/2021), for Neoptolemus in Kae Tempest's Paradise (National Theatre)
- Rilwan Abiola Owokoniran (2022), for Algernon Moncrieff in The Importance of Being Earnest (English Touring Theatre)
- Francesca Mills (2023), for Hermia in A Midsummer Night's Dream (Shakespeare's Globe)
- Francesca Amewudah-Rivers (2024), for Juliet in Romeo and Juliet (Duke of York's Theatre)
- Isis Hainsworth (2025), for Isabella in Measure for Measure (Royal Shakespeare Company)
