= Darwin's Ghosts: The Secret History of Evolution =

2012 book by Rebecca Scott

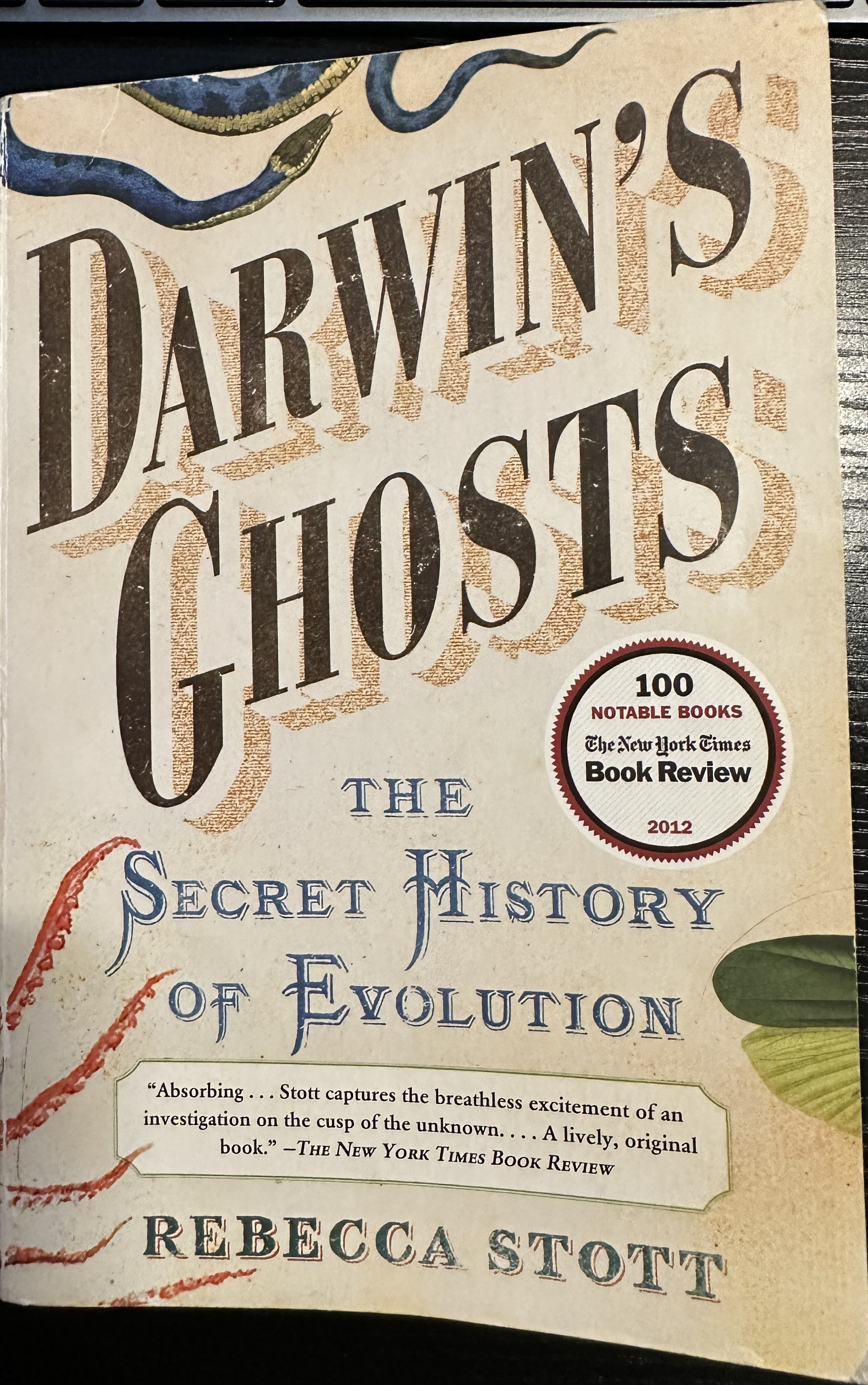
- Author: Rebecca Stott
- Language: English
- Genre: History of Science
- Publisher: Spiegel & Grau
- Publication date: 2012
- ISBN: 978-0-8129-8170-4

Darwin's Ghosts: The Secret History of Evolution is a nonfiction history of science book by British author Rebecca Stott. It was published in the United States in 2012 by Spiegel & Grau, the international version is subtitled differently: Darwin's Ghosts: In Search of the First Evolutionists. It is written in 12 distinct chapters that highlight persons that contributed to the pre-history of evolution by natural selection, published by Charles Darwin in On the Origin of Species in 1859. The book contains biographical sketches of 12 persons spanning from 344 BC to 19th century contemporaries of Darwin.

The book has received reviews from notable reviewers and was included on the New York Times Book Review 100 Notable Books 2012 list.

== Synopsis ==
Tho focus of each chapter is summarized in the table below.

Chapter Number	Title	Bibliographic Focus	Time	Location
1	Darwin's List	Charles Darwin	1859	Kent
2	Aristolte's Eyes	Aristotle	344 BCE	Lesbos
3	The Worshipful Curiosity of Jahiz	Al-Jahiz	850	Basra & Baghdad
4	Leonardo and the Potter	Leonardo da Vinci Bernard Palissy	1493 1570	Milan Paris
5	Trembley's Polyp	Abraham Trembley	1740	The Hague
6	The Consul of Cairo	Benoît de Maillet	1708	Cairo
7	The Hotel of the Philosophers	Denis Diderot	1749	Paris
8	Erasmus Underground	Erasmus Darwin	1767	Derbyshire
9	The Jardin des Plantes	Geoffroy Saint-Hilaire	1800	Paris
10	The Sponge Philosopher	Robert Edmond Grant	1826	Edinburgh
11	The Encyclopedist	Robert Chambers	1844	Edinburgh
12	Alfred Wallace's Fevered Dream	Alfred Russel Wallace	1858	Malay Archipelago
