= The Line of Beauty (play) =

- World premiere production poster
- Written by: Jack Holden (Adapter)
- Based on: The Line of Beauty by Alan Hollinghurst

Premiere
- Date: 21 October 2025
- Place: Almeida Theatre, London
- Directed by: Michael Grandage

The Line of Beauty is a stage adaptation of the book of the same name by Alan Hollinghurst. It was adapted for the stage by Jack Holden. It had its world premiere in 2025 at London's Almeida Theatre. It was directed by Michael Grandage.

== Production history ==
=== Off-West End (2025) ===
The production began previews on 21 October 2025 and had its official world premiere on 29 October 2025 at the Almeida Theatre in London. The production was directed by Michael Grandage. It stars Jasper Talbot as Nick Guest, Francessca Amewudah-Rivers as Rosemary Charles, Leo Suter as Toby Fedden, Claudia Harrison as Rachel Fedden, and Charles Edwards as Gerald Fedden.

== Cast and characters ==
Character	Off-West End
Character	2025
Nick Guest	Jasper Talbot
Toby Fedden	Leo Suter
Rachel Fedden	Claudia Harrison
Gerald Fedden	Charles Edwards
Rosemary Charles	Francesca Amewudah-Rivers
Cat Fedden	Ellie Bamber
Leo Charles	Alistair Nwachukwu
Mrs. Charles	Doreene Blackstock
Wani Ouradi	Arty Froushan
Derek 'Badger' Brogan	Robert Portal
Peter Mawson/ Ricky	Matt Mella
Penny Kent/ Sophie Tipper	Hannah Morrish
