= Andrew Hilton =

British actor and theatre director

Andrew Piers Marsden Hilton (born 21 October 1947) is an English actor, theatre director and author, best known for the creation of the Shakespeare at the Tobacco Factory company in Bristol 1999–2021.

== Background and education ==
Hilton was born in Bolton, Lancashire, and educated at Bolton School. He read English at Churchill College, Cambridge, studying under George Steiner and Michael Long. He worked as a student actor for Jonathan Miller (in the Oxford and Cambridge Shakespeare Company's Hamlet and Julius Caesar) and, via that connection, entered the professional theatre as a trainee director at Bernard Miles' Mermaid Theatre in London. There he worked from 1971 to 1975, much of his time directing and writing plays about science for the theatre's educational wing, the Molecule Theatre. He became a Mermaid Associate Director in 1974.

In 1975 he joined the Greenwich Company as an actor for Jonathan Miller's productions of Measure for Measure and All's Well that Ends Well, quickly followed by a 3-year contract with the National Theatre, beginning at the London Old Vic and moving to the new theatre on the South Bank. There he appeared in the Peter Hall/Albert Finney Hamlet and Tamburlaine the Great, the John Schlesinger/John Gielgud Julius Caesar, Elijah Moshinky's production of Troilus & Cressida (as Diomedes), and Michael Blakemore's production of Ben Travers' Plunder.

He then joined the Bristol Old Vic company in 1978, where he played in over twenty productions, roles including Haig and the Sergeant-Major in Oh What a Lovely War!, Flavius in Timon of Athens, Kershaw in Destiny, Ernst in Cabaret and Wyke in Sleuth. It was there in 1983 that he met his wife-to-be, the stage manager and artist, Diana Favell. There followed several years of TV and radio work, interspersed with theatre jobs in Manchester and York, a UK tour of The Royal Hunt of the Sun and a British Council tour of the Far and Middle East.

== Shakespeare at the Tobacco Factory ==
In 1989 Hilton and Favell joined a group of actors, writers and directors to start the first regular pub theatre in Bristol, dedicated largely to new writing. The company, Show of Strength Theatre Company, found the Hen & Chicken pub in the south of the city, in Bedminster, and inaugurated winter seasons there that were to last for six years and attract national attention.

Hilton directed six productions for the company – the world premières of Tales of the Undead by Dominic Power, and Let's Do It and Rough Music by James Wilson; the UK premiere of Michael Gow's Away; the English professional première of Brian Friel's Living Quarters; and an in-the-round production of Measure for Measure. In 1998, after Hilton and Favell had both left the company, Show of Strength moved its operation to the Tobacco Factory – then in process of restoration and redevelopment by George Ferguson – and it was this that inspired them to create 'Shakespeare at the Tobacco Factory in 1999.

Shakespeare at the Tobacco Factory (stf) began as a commercial venture and survived as such for five spring seasons at the Tobacco Factory Theatre, winning a Peter Brook/Empty Space Award in 2001 and culminating in the transfer of the 2004 season of Macbeth and The Changeling to the Barbican's Pit Theatre. The company was then reformed as a charity, as it continued until it was wound up in 2022. In addition to spring seasons at the Factory it co-produced with the Bristol Old Vic, and appeared in the Galway Festival. A programme of national touring began in 2013 with Two Gentlemen of Verona, and a new collaboration with the University of Bristol in 2014. In 2015 the company began international touring, playing at the Neuss Festival in Germany in 2015, 2016 & 2017, and at the Craiova International Festival in Romania in 2016.

While Shakespeare has clearly been his main focus, Hilton has attracted high praise for his three Chekhov productions - Three Sisters, Uncle Vanya and The Cherry Orchard - and also for his productions of Tom Stoppard's Arcadia, Sheridan's The School for Scandal and Friel's Living Quarters. In most of his work Hilton works in collaboration with the playwright, Dominic Power, who edits Shakespeare with him and has also contributed new scenes to Measure for Measure, The Changeling, The Taming of the Shrew, Two Gentlemen of Verona and All's Well That Ends Well. He has also enjoyed longstanding collaborations with the designer Harriet de Winton, the composer John Telfer and the composer & sound designers Elizabeth Purnell and Dan Jones.

He stepped down as artistic director of Shakespeare at the Tobacco Factory to resume freelance work in July 2017.

== Productions ==
Tales of the Undead by Dominic Power (Show of Strength 1989)

Let's Do It by James Wilson (Show of Strength 1990)

Living Quarters by Brian Friel (Show of Strength 1991)

Measure for Measure by Shakespeare (Show of Strength 1992)

Away by Michael Gow's (Show of Strength 1993)

Serious Money by Caryl Churchill (Bristol Old Vic Theatre School 1996)

Rough Music by James Wilson (Show of Strength 1996)

King Lear and A Midsummer Night's Dream (Shakespeare at the Tobacco Factory 2000)

Measure for Measure and Coriolanus (Shakespeare at the Tobacco Factory 2001 – Peter Brook/Empty Space Award)

The Winter's Tale'' and Twelfth Night (Shakespeare at the Tobacco Factory 2002)

Troilus & Cressida and As You Like It (Shakespeare at the Tobacco Factory 2003)

Macbeth and Middleton & Rowley's The Changeling (Shakespeare at the Tobacco Factory 2004 at the Tobacco Factory and the Barbican Pit)

Pericles and Chekhov's Three Sisters (Shakespeare at the Tobacco Factory 2005)

Titus Andronicus and Love's Labours Lost (Shakespeare at the Tobacco Factory 2006)

Othello and Much Ado about Nothing (Shakespeare at the Tobacco Factory 2007)

The Taming of the Shrew'' (Shakespeare at the Tobacco Factory 2008)

Julius Caesar and Antony & Cleopatra (Shakespeare at the Tobacco Factory 2009)

Chekhov's Uncle Vanya (Shakespeare at the Tobacco Factory & Bristol Old Vic Co-production, Theatre Royal, 2009, and Galway Festival 2010)

The Tempest and A Midsummer Night's Dream (Shakespeare at the Tobacco Factory 2010)

Molière/Tony Harrison's The Misanthrope (Shakespeare at the Tobacco Factory & Bristol Old Vic Co-production, Theatre Royal, 2010)

Richard II (SATTF 2011)

The Comedy of Errors (Shakespeare at the Tobacco Factory and Exeter Northcott, 2011)

King Lear (Shakespeare at the Tobacco Factory 2012)

Chekhov's The Cherry Orchard (Shakespeare at the Tobacco Factory and Kingston Rose 2012)

Richard III and Two Gentlemen of Verona (Shakespeare at the Tobacco Factory 2013)

As You Like It and Tom Stoppard's Arcadia (Shakespeare at the Tobacco Factory 2014)

Allan Monkhouse's The Conquering Hero (Shakespeare at the Tobacco Factory & University of Bristol Script-in-Hand Production 2014)

Sheridan's The School for Scandal (Shakespeare at the Tobacco Factory 2015)

Friel's Living Quarters (Tobacco Factory Theatres & Shakespeare at the Tobacco Factory Co-production 2015)

Hamlet and All's Well That Ends Well (Shakespeare at the Tobacco Factory 2016)

Molière's Tartuffe (Version, Shakespeare at the Tobacco Factory 2017)

== Authorship ==
'Shakespeare on the Factory Floor' (Nick Hern Books 2022)

'Staging the Word, the Life & Death of a Theatre Company' (Favell & Marsden 2024)

Sparks! (Mermaid Theatre and UK tour 1974; revived 1975, 1977, 1979, 1982)

It's Not What It Seems (BBC Schools Radio 1975)

Ten (BBC Schools Radio 1976)

Transcontinental – Governor Stanford (BBC Schools Radio 1977)

The Patent-Office Robbery (Mermaid Theatre and UK tour 1978; revived 1983, 1984, 1986, 1987)

Fire Island (Mermaid Theatre and UK Tour 1984; revived 1985)

Chekov's Gun (BBC Radio 3 Talk in The Essay Series, 2009)

With Dominic Power, a radical new version of Molière's Tartuffe (2017)

Hilton is a Patron of Warwick's Shakespeare Young Company, and of the Bridge Foundation for Psychotherapy and the Arts. In 2013 he was awarded an Honorary Doctorate of Letters by the University of Bristol for his services to theatre in the city. He teaches freelance for the University of Bristol.
