= Jack Holden (actor) =

English actor (born 1990)

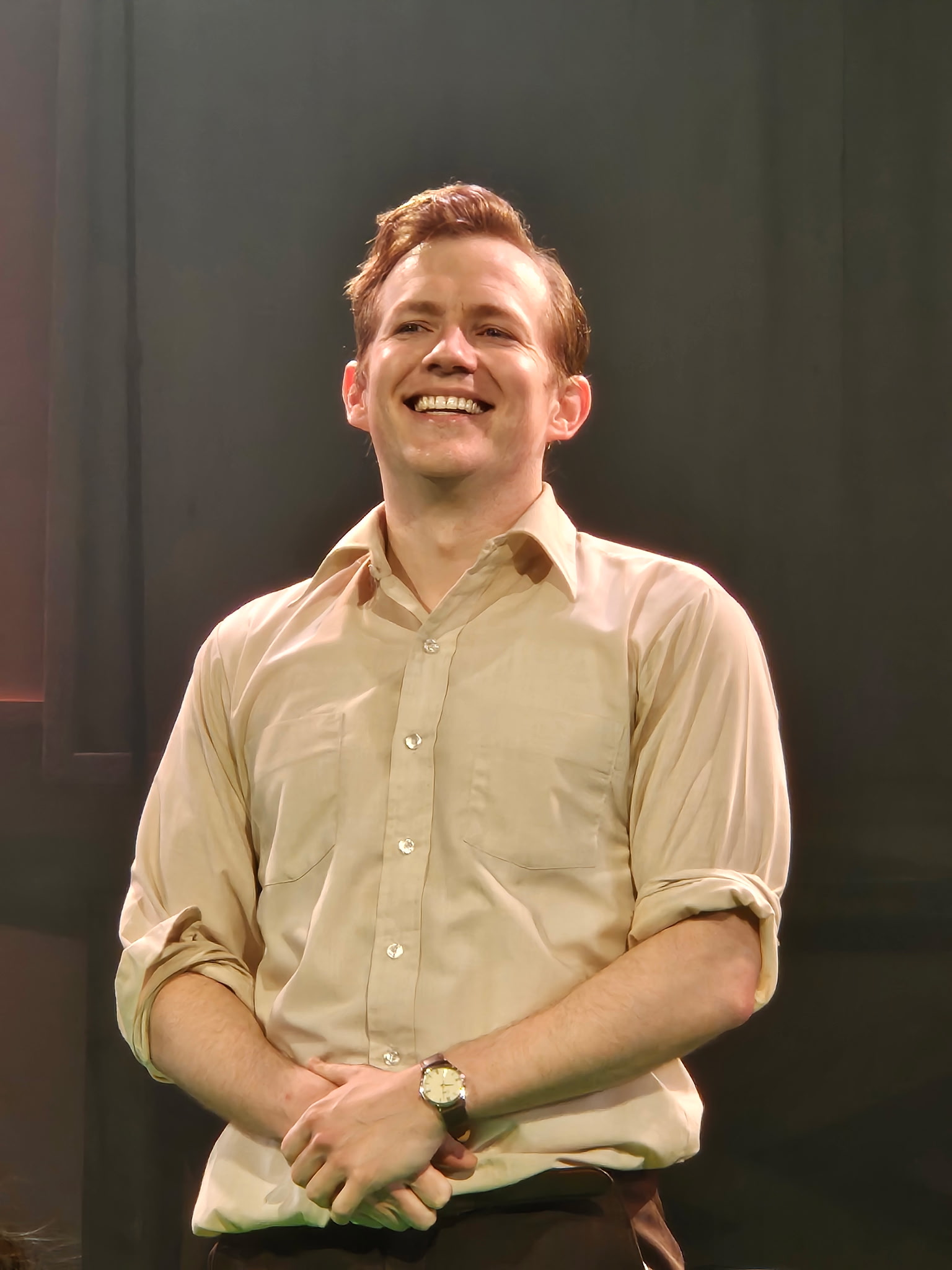
- Holden at Kenrex curtain call, 2026
- Born: 31 March 1990 (age 36)
- Occupations: Actor, writer, producer
- Years active: 2011–present

Jack Holden (born 31 March 1990) is an English actor, writer and producer from Tonbridge in Kent. He is best known for his roles in the television series Marriage with Sean Bean and Nicola Walker and in Ten Percent. Holden began his acting career starring in West End play War Horse and has attracted critical acclaim for both his writing and performance, especially in one-man shows. He has received two Laurence Olivier Award nominations and won the award for Best Actor in 2026, for his role in Kenrex. He is part of the cast of the Ocean's Eleven prequel directed by Bradley Cooper.

== Education ==
Holden graduated from the Bristol Old Vic Theatre School in 2011.

== Career ==
After graduating from the Bristol Old Vic, Holden starred in the lead role in the West End play War Horse.

In 2014, Holden played the role of Joe Bonham in the UK première of the play Johnny Got His Gun, based on the novel by Dalton Trumbo. His performance received a positive review from The Independent.

His performance as Bobby in an adaptation of Awkward Conversations With Animals I've Fucked by Rob Hayes during the 2014-15 Edinburgh Fringe received critical acclaim. Holden has also performed frequently with the Royal Shakespeare Company in such productions as The Shoemaker's Holiday by Thomas Dekker, and in the world première of Tom Morton Smith's Oppenheimer directed by Angus Jackson and starring John Heffernan as Robert Oppenheimer.

Holden recorded several episodes of the BBC Radio drama Home Front, and played the part of Meus in the BBC Radio 4's broadcast premiere of Orson Welles' unproduced screenplay of Joseph Conrad's novel Heart of Darkness, starring James McAvoy.

From February 2016, Holden appeared as Lysander in a national tour of Midsummer Night's Dream which visited 12 venues including Belfast, Glasgow, Newcastle, Blackpool, Truro, the RSC's homes at the Barbican Centre and the Royal Shakespeare Theatre in Stratford. The BBC planned to film the production which involved actors from 12 different amateur theatre companies. Holden also appeared in the 2017 film Journey's End. Holden was in the world première of Ink by James Graham at the Almeida Theatre from June to August 2017, and in 2019 he was in the Bath Theatre Royal production of My Cousin Rachel (the play by Joseph O'Connor based on the Daphne du Maurier novel) with Helen George and Simon Shepherd.

As a writer, Holden's debut one-man play Cruise premiered at the Duchess Theatre, London in Summer 2021, reopening the West End to critical acclaim; it was nominated for an Olivier Award for Best New Play. Cruise music producer John Patrick Elliott won the Best Composer Award at The Stage Debut Awards 2022, which was accepted by Holden on Elliott's behalf.

In 2022, Holden appeared as Kevin Barnes in Ten Percent, the English remake of the French original, Call My Agent!.

In the seven years before 2024, Holden co wrote 'Kenrex' with Ed Stamboulian (with whom he has worked since their days at Bristol Old Vic) with John Patrick Elliott again providing the music. It opened in November at the Sheffield Theatres (joint producers with Katy Lipson's Aria Entertainment) before transferring to the Southwark Playhouse. Throughout these runs it received rave reviews.

The Daily Telegraph gave Kenrex 5 stars describing the play as "Under Milk Wood meets Sergio Leone" and Holden's performance as "extraordinary".

Mark Fisher, in The Guardian, wrote "Jack Holden is astonishing in a play that grips like a true-crime podcast."

The Stage concluded "Jack Holden gives a virtuoso solo performance of astonishing precision, humour and sheer confidence in this show." whilst What's On Stage described the show as "spellbinding", awarding it five stars.

In October 2025, Holden received the award for Best Performer in a Play for his role in Kenrex in the UK Theatre Awards.

In October 2025, Holden's adaptation of The Line of Beauty, Alan Hollinghurst's Booker Prize winning novel, opened at the Almeida, directed by Michael Grandage. Holden explained something of the play's development in conversation with Susie Mesure in the Financial Times describing it as "structured as a Faustian tale".

London Theatre described it as an "artful, intricate retelling"; The Stage as "unarguably adroit and accomplished."

Kenrex re-opened at The Other Palace 3 December 2025 running until 1st February 2026. It rapidly sold out and, again, received rave reviews with several naming it as their show of the year.

Once again, Kenrex and Holden received five star reviews. Sarah Hemming in the Financial Times concluded the show combined "forensic fascination of a true crime podcast and the swagger and style of a Western — all of it brilliantly performed by the versatile Jack Holden".

In March 2026, Kenrex received six nominations from the Olivier awards winning for sound design and for Holden himself won the award for best actor, beating Tom Hiddleston, Bryan Cranston and Sean Hayes to the accolade.

In April 2026 Kenrex opened in New York at the Lucille Lortel Theater for a limited run.

On 6 January, Holden was named in the Stage 100 as actor and writer - amongst the 15 named in the category 'Independent Creatives'

In May 2026, Holden won the Drama Desk Award for Outstanding Solo Performance.

== Personal life ==
Holden is queer.

== Performances and works ==
=== Actor ===
Year	Title	Role	Notes
2012	Lewis	Ben Newbound	Series 6 episode 2: Generation of Vipers
2013	National Theatre Live: 50 Years On Stage	Albert	Television film; segment: War Horse
2013	Stray	Alan	Short film
2016	The Levelling	James	
2016	The Best Bottoms in the Land	Himself/Lysander	3 episodes
2017	Journey's End	Private Turner	
2017	What the Butler Saw	Nicholas Beckett	Video
2019	Traitors	Will Anderson	2 episodes
2021	The Rev	Rev Neil Marlow	Short film
2021	Hiya Janice	Declan	Short film
2022	Ten Percent	Kevin Barnes	4 episodes
2022	Marriage	Adam	4 episodes
2027	Untitled Ocean's Eleven prequel		Filming

=== Producer ===
Year	Title	Notes
2018	Blood out of a Stone	Short film
2021	The Rev	Short film
2022	Near	Short film
TBA	Under the Blue	Co-producer; currently in post-production
