= Hannah Morrish =

British Actor

- Born: 13 April 1993 (age 33); York, England
- Education: Drama Centre London
- Occupation: Actor
- Years active: 2010–present
- Mother: Rebecca Stott

Hannah Morrish (born 13 April 1993) is an English actress and novelist. She is known for her work in theatre, having received a Commendation (2017) and a Second Prize (2018) at the Ian Charleson Awards.

== Early life and education ==
Morrish was born 13 April 1993 in York, England. Her mother is the writer Rebecca Stott. A member of the National Youth Theatre, she was cast as Emma Soyer in James Graham's play Relish in 2010.

Morrish trained at the National Youth Theatre Rep Company in 2011. She graduated from Drama Centre London in 2015.

== Career ==
Morrish made her television debut in Call the Midwife in 2015. She went on to play Portia in Julius Caesar, Lavinia in Titus Andronicus and Virgilia in Coriolanus at the Royal Shakespeare Company in 2017. She received an Ian Charleson Award Commendation for her performance as Lavinia in Titus Andronicus in 2017.

In 2018, she played Octavia in Antony and Cleopatra opposite Ralph Fiennes at the National Theatre, for which she received Second Prize at the Ian Charleson Awards in 2018. Kate Kellaway in The Guardian described her performance as "strikingly good […] a demure Scotswoman in a powder-blue dress who shows us what it is to have your heart broken in public."

Morrish wrote and starred in the short film Ceres opposite Juliet Stevenson in 2022.

In 2023, she starred as Portia in The Merchant of Venice 1936, which toured the UK and came to the Criterion Theatre in the West End in 2024.

In 2025, she played Lydia in Conor McPherson's The Brightening Air at the Old Vic. Anya Ryan in London Theatre described her performance as "quietly shattering".

In 2026, Sceptre (a Hodder & Stoughton imprint) acquired the rights to publish Morrish's debut novel Such Stuff in early 2027.

== Credits ==
=== Theatre ===
Year	Title	Role	Venue
2013	A Little Hotel on the Side	Violette	Theatre Royal Bath
2015	Flowering Cherry	Judy Cherry	Finborough Theatre
2016	Arms and the Man	Raina Petkoff	Watford Palace Theatre
2017	Titus Andronicus	Lavinia	Royal Shakespeare Company / Barbican Centre
2017	Julius Caesar	Portia	Royal Shakespeare Company / Barbican Centre
2017	Coriolanus	Virgilia	Royal Shakespeare Company / Barbican Centre
2018	Antony and Cleopatra	Octavia	National Theatre
2019	All's Well That Ends Well	Helena	Jermyn Street Theatre
2022	Cancelling Socrates	Xanthippe	Jermyn Street Theatre
2022	The Darkest Part of the Night	Anna	Kiln Theatre
2023–2024	The Merchant of Venice 1936	Portia	Royal Shakespeare Company / West End
2024	The Confessions	Alice	A Zeldin Company / European Tour
2025	The Brightening Air	Lydia	Old Vic
2025	The Line of Beauty	Penny/Sophie	Almeida Theatre

=== Film ===
Year	Title	Role	Notes
2012	Arcade	Pandora	Short film
2015	No More Kings	Sigrid	Short film
2018	Magpie	Lily	
2021	Nell and Pauline	Pauline	Short film
2022	Ceres	Proserpina	Short film

=== Television ===
Year	Title	Role	Notes
2015	Call the Midwife	Dorothy Whitmore	Series 5 Episode 3
2019	Father Brown	Pippa	Season 8 Episode 5
2023	Boty: The Life and Times of a Forgotten Artist	Pauline Boty	

== Awards and nominations ==
Year	Award	Nominated Work	Role	Result	Ref.
2017	Ian Charleson Awards	Titus Andronicus	Lavinia	Nominated	
2018	Ian Charleson Awards	Antony and Cleopatra	Octavia	2nd	
