= The Line of Beauty =

2004 novel by Alan Hollinghurst

- First edition
- Author: Alan Hollinghurst
- Language: English
- Genre: Gay literature; Historical novel
- Publisher: Picador Books
- Publication date: 2004
- Publication place: United Kingdom
- Media type: Print (Paperback and Hardback)
- Pages: 400
- ISBN: 0-330-48321-8
- OCLC: 263634123

The Line of Beauty is a 2004 Man Booker Prize-winning novel by English writer Alan Hollinghurst.

== Plot ==
The novel is set in Britain in three parts, taking place in 1983, 1986 and 1987. The story surrounds the young gay protagonist, Nick Guest. Nick is middle-class and from the fictional market town of Barwick in Northamptonshire; he has graduated from Worcester College, Oxford with a First in English and is to begin postgraduate studies at University College London. Many of the significant characters in the novel are Nick's male contemporaries from Oxford.

The book explores the tension between Nick's intimate relationship with the Fedden family, in whose parties and holidays he participates, and the realities of his sexuality and gay life, which the Feddens accept only to the extent of never mentioning it. It explores themes of hypocrisy, privilege, drugs, and homosexuality, with the emerging AIDS crisis forming a backdrop to the book's conclusion.

=== "The Love Chord" (1983) ===
The novel begins in the summer of 1983, shortly after Margaret Thatcher's second victory in the general election. Nick moves into the luxurious Notting Hill home of the Fedden family. The Feddens' son, Toby, is Nick's Oxford University classmate on whom he has a secret crush. Nick's stay is meant to last for a short time while Toby and his parents—Rachel, the daughter of an extremely wealthy Rothschild-like Jewish family, and Gerald, a successful businessman and just-elected Conservative MP for Barwick—are at their holiday home in France. Left at home with Nick is the Feddens' daughter Catherine whom the Feddens are reluctant to leave on her own because of her history of self-harming. Nick helps Cat through a crisis when she considers cutting herself, and when her parents return they suggest he stay on indefinitely, since Cat has become attached to him and Toby is moving into his own place.

Nick dates Leo Charles, a black man from Willesden in his late 20s, whom he meets through a lonely hearts column. As Leo lives with his religious mother and Nick feels restricted in the Fedden household, the two conduct their sexual affair almost entirely outside in public parks and side streets.

Leo also introduces Nick to Pete, his middle-aged former lover who runs an antiques shop, like Nick's father, and who is sickly.

=== "To Whom Do You Beautifully Belong?" (1986) ===
Having never moved out, Nick is now a permanent member of the Fedden household. He spends most of his time with Wani Ouradi, one of his Oxford contemporaries, the son of a rich Lebanese businessman. Despite the fact that Nick is openly gay, Wani appears to have a female fiancée and remains closeted, so their relationship is kept secret. Though Nick is finishing his doctorate on Henry James, he spends most of his time living a decadent lifestyle of drugs and sex with Wani who lavishes him with money and expensive gifts. To cover their relationship Wani pretends Nick is helping him write a screenplay of The Spoils of Poynton as well as helping him establish Ogee, a luxury magazine Wani wants to create.

Nick discovers by accident that Gerald is having an affair with his assistant, Penny, which disturbs his view of the Feddens.

Catherine has now been diagnosed as being bipolar and is on lithium, which helps to control her mood swings. She realizes that Nick is having an affair with Wani when the two of them spend time at the Feddens' French country home.

A party is thrown for Rachel and Gerald's 25th wedding anniversary. Nick meets Margaret Thatcher for the first time and, high on coke, asks her to dance, which she accepts.

=== "The End of the Street" (1987) ===
In 1987 on election day Nick goes to vote and does not vote for the Conservative candidate but a member of the Green party. He is visited by Leo's sister at the Ogee office where he learns that Leo died a few weeks before of AIDS and his sister is trying to warn all his former lovers. Nick spends election night at home alone with Catherine. Nick watches as his former gay university friend Polly is elected an MP at 28 and Gerald barely scrapes back in his seat.

He later has a working lunch with two possible gay film investors. Wani arrives late. He has AIDS and is wasting away. Wani offers to leave Nick some property that he owns as it will ensure Nick's financial security for the rest of his life. He also warns Nick that a scandal over improperly managed funds will soon be breaking around Gerald.

Going home Nick finds that the scandal has already broken. A boisterous Cat, now overly energetic thanks to her medication, has Nick drive her to a location where they find Penny and Gerald together. Cat exposes their affair, which forces Gerald to resign as an MP and causes resentment between Rachel and Nick, where Rachel blames Nick for her own lack of responsibility regarding Cat, and contends Nick never truly understood that his role was to take care of Catherine, not indulge her.

Shortly after, the press (who have been camped outside the Feddens' home), publish a story on Wani and Nick, causing greater scandal. Gerald uses Nick as a scapegoat and accuses him of attaching himself to the family and then wrecking them because of his homosexuality.

Nick goes to live with Wani and views the first and final issue of Ogee. He goes back to the Feddens' house to collect his things, knowing they are absent for a wedding, and runs into Penny, who reveals that she is going to continue her affair with Gerald. Nick leaves the Feddens' house for the final time, and muses on the HIV test he is having done the next day, which he imagines will be positive.

== Title ==
The title of the book refers to the Line of Beauty — the double "S" of the ogee shape, a shape which "swings both ways". William Hogarth, in his 1753 book The Analysis of Beauty, describes how beauty itself is embodied in the shape, which protagonist Nick Guest uses to describe Wani's body. In contrast, other characters describe lines of cocaine as "beautiful". Nick also describes being motivated by beauty for its own sake, a character trait that the other characters cannot relate to.

== Major themes ==
The book touches upon the emergence of HIV/AIDS, as well as the relationship between politics and homosexuality, and its ambivalent acceptance within the 1980s Conservative Party and mainstream society. The book also considers heterosexual hypocrisy regarding homosexual promiscuity. Finally, an underlying theme is the nature of beauty. Nick is attracted to physical beauty in art and in men. However, he pays a price for his choices: his beautiful lover Wani is a self-hating homosexual, and the Feddens' home (in which Nick Guest remains a guest) is filled with both exquisite art and vile hypocrisy. The novel also deals with the coming out experience of Nick and of gay men in general.

The novel explores the question of whether a gay man can remain apolitical in a homophobic society. Nick's dance with Margaret Thatcher has overtones of a dance with the devil.

Social and economic classes are also a major theme: Nick envies the house, connections and mannerism of the Fedden family. It is made particularly apparent when the Fedden and Nick visit Toby's aristocratic uncle, who owns several rare pieces of furniture and books. Nick acknowledges the value of those objects because his father is an antiquarian. He is happy to see the furniture as a visitor, a friend of the family, and not as the son of a merchant.

The book refers frequently to the life and works of Henry James.

== Reception ==
=== Critical reception ===
Hollinghurst has received praise for his portrayal of life among the privileged governing classes during the early to middle 1980s. The novel has been compared to Anthony Powell's A Dance to the Music of Time, with special regard to Powell's character Nicholas Jenkins. The protagonist has also been likened to Nick Carraway in F. Scott Fitzgerald's The Great Gatsby. James Wood, writing for The New Republic, praised the novel, calling it "an ample and sophisticated delight, charged with hundreds of delicate impressions and insights, and scores of vital and lovely sentences", although he criticized the ending as a "somewhat trite and anachronistic vision of the homosexual as a figure always doomed to be unhoused and exiled from happiness, solitary and lonely, without family or friends, always nostalgic for a bosom that has always, if only secretly, rejected him."

Margaret Thatcher's appearance has been compared to that of Kurtz in Joseph Conrad's Heart of Darkness; Sir Maurice Tipper and his wife have been compared to Evelyn Waugh characters.

=== Awards and Lists ===
The book won the 2004 Man Booker Prize. In 2019, the novel was ranked 38th on The Guardian's list of the 100 best books of the 21st century.

== Adaptations ==
In 2006, a three-part television adaptation was broadcast by the BBC, and later released on DVD. Dan Stevens plays Nick Guest, with Oliver Coleman as Toby, Alice Krige as Rachel, and Tim McInnerny as Gerald.

In 2025, The Line of Beauty was adapted for the stage by Jack Holden. It premiered off-West End at the Almeida Theatre and was directed by Michael Grandage.
