= Kate Bassett =

British journalist

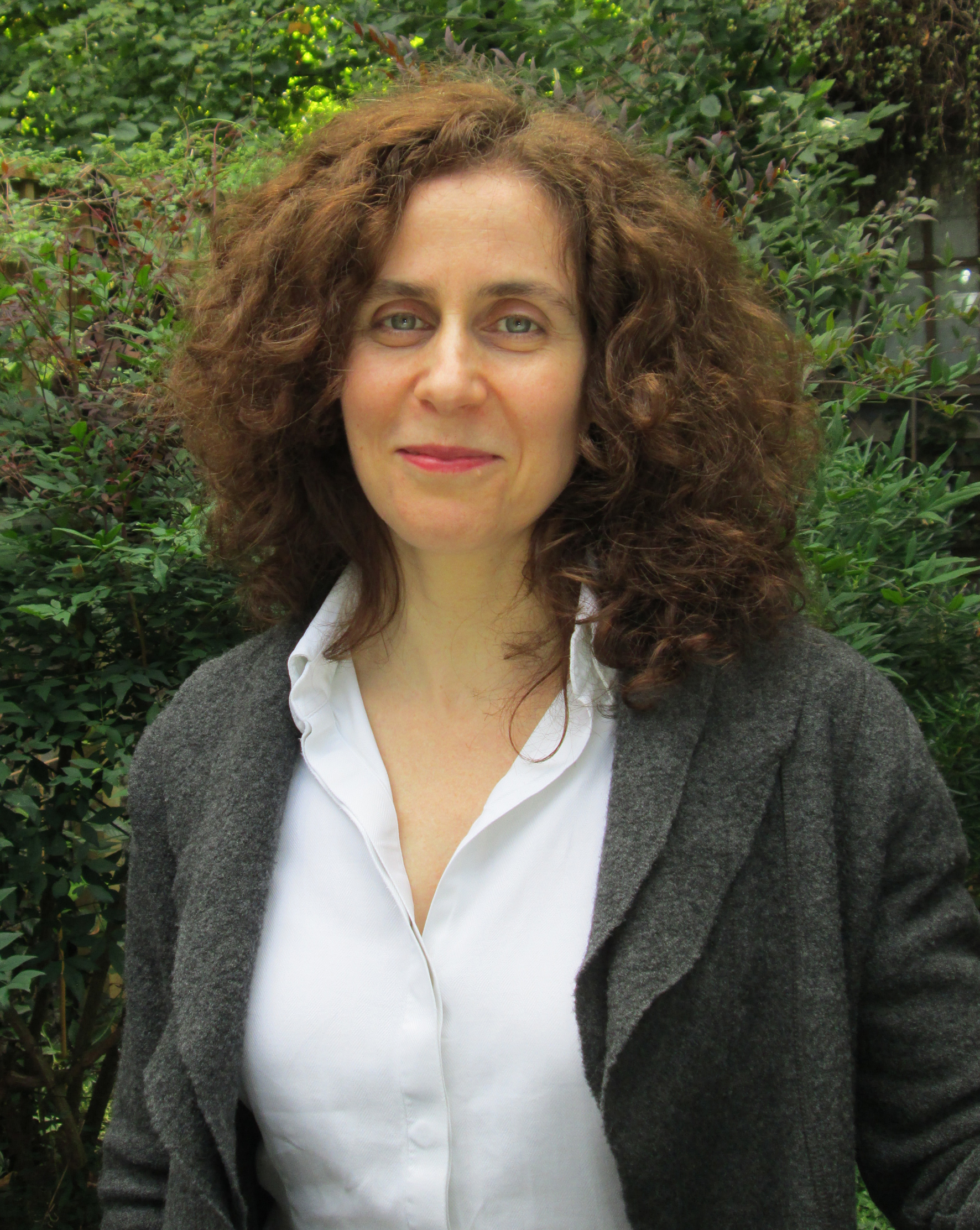
- Kate Bassett in 2014
- Born: 11 February 1967 (age 59); Cambridge, England
- Occupations: Journalist and author
- Writing career
- Genres: Theatre criticism and arts journalism

Kate Bassett (born 11 February 1967) is a British journalist, writer, dramaturg and script consultant for stage and screen.

She was educated at the Hertfordshire and Essex High School, won a Bernard Sunley Scholarship to Westminster School in London, before reading English Literature at Corpus Christi College, Cambridge, on a Manners Scholarship.

She worked as a feature writer and theatre reviewer for the Independent on Sunday from 2000 to September 2013 and, prior to that, for the Daily Telegraph (from 1996) and The Times (1993 to 1996). She was dance editor and deputy theatre editor of City Limits. Her features and reviews have also covered comedy, dance, books, film and opera, with further publications including Time Out, the New Statesman, the Times Literary Supplement, the Guardian, and the Literary Review. She has been on BBC Radio's Saturday Review, Night Waves and On Air.

She has twice chaired the Edinburgh Comedy Awards, and been a judge on the Susan Smith Blackburn Prize, Ian Charleson Awards, David Cohen Prize, Equity's Clarence Derwent Awards, Verity Bargate Award for emerging playwrights, UK Theatre Awards, Peter Brook Empty Space Awards, European Theatre Convention Awards, Hackney Empire New Act of the Year Awards, and Channel 4's So You Think You're Funny Awards. She hosts and takes part in platform talks at the Royal National Theatre and elsewhere.

Her book In Two Minds: A Biography of Jonathan Miller (2012) was favourably reviewed. In 2013, it was shortlisted for the Sheridan Morley Prize for Theatre Biography; the Theatre Book Prize (Society for Theatre Research); and the HW Fisher Best First Biography Prize.

It emerged at the end of July 2013 that Bassett was soon to leave The Independent on Sunday, as the newspaper was reducing its arts coverage. The paper made its established team of arts reviewers redundant on 1 September 2013, a fact that provoked much media comment.

In September 2014, she was appointed as an Associate Professor of Creative Writing in the Department of English Literature at Reading University and was Chichester Festival Theatre's Literary Associate from 2016 to 2023, going on to work as a script consultant for stage and screen, a researcher and a verbatim playwright for companies including the BBC and Royal Court Theatre.
