= John Peter (critic) =

British theatre critic (1938–2020)

John Anthony Peter MBE (born Janos Antal Peter; 24 August 1938 – 3 July 2020) was a Hungarian-born British theatre critic, who immigrated to Britain in 1956. He was chief drama critic of The Sunday Times from 1984 to 2003, and The Sunday Times contributing drama critic through to 2010. In 1990 he founded the Ian Charleson Awards, which he directed until 2017.

== Early life and education ==
Peter was born in Budapest, Hungary in 1938. His father Andras Peter (1903–1944), an esteemed art historian and third-generation Catholic who was fond of England, was killed by Hungarian Nazis in 1944 because of his Jewish ancestry. His mother Veronica, called Vera, was a former actress.

When he was 13 his mother remarried, to Gery Prasnovsky, who lived in impoverished circumstances in a village 60 miles south of Budapest. Prasnovsky became an alcoholic, and Peter and his mother eventually left to live with friends in Budapest.

Peter's love of theatre began in 1955 when he saw a revolutionary staging of Richard III at the National Theatre in Budapest.

During the Hungarian Revolution of 1956, when he was 18, Peter and his mother fled from Budapest to Austria, hidden in a hay cart. Knowing no English, he and his mother nevertheless received transport to England, which they had their hearts set on, aided by the Red Cross.

He anglicised his name upon arrival in England, and began assiduously learning the English language, while he and his mother lived in one of the refugee camps that the 30,000 Hungarian refugees to Britain were placed in, specifically a barracks near Tidworth, in Wiltshire. Within two months they were settled in an East London flat, a converted disused church in Wapping. Peter worked at Forte's Milk Bar, and continued to learn the English language and British customs.

Nine months after arriving in England, Peter entered Campion Hall, Oxford University. Beginning by studying History, he soon he learned enough of the language to switch to English Language and Literature. He worked as a part-time college servant and waiter in return for his fees and expenses, and after one year he was given a grant. After graduation, he did post-graduate work at Lincoln College, Oxford, receiving a Bachelor of Letters (B.Litt.) in Renaissance English Literature, and his earlier degree was raised to a Master of Arts.

In 1996, he was awarded an honorary doctorate degree from De Montfort University in Leicester.

== Career ==
=== Times Newspapers ===
Peter began his career while still a post-graduate student at Oxford writing a dissertation on Elizabethan and Jacobean drama. An undergraduate friend was writing theatre reviews for The Times, and after his friend left the university Peter applied to The Times. He was interviewed and asked to submit a few short reviews of university productions which he had been writing in the Oxford student newspapers The Isis Magazine and Cherwell.

He applied and was accepted as a reporter and editorial assistant for the Times Educational Supplement from 1964 to 1967. This was a three-year apprenticeship, during which he saw a lot of London theatre and became a freelance theatre critic, submitting reviews more and more frequently to The Times.

From 1967 to 1979, Peter was on The Sunday Times editorial staff, contributing theatre reviews regularly. He became the newspaper's assistant arts editor in 1979.

In September 1984 Peter became chief drama critic of The Sunday Times. He continued in this position through 2003, following which he was the Sunday Times contributing drama critic through to 2010.

In February 2003, Theatregoer magazine listed and interviewed him as one of 11 critics called the "most powerful people in theatre".

=== Ian Charleson Award ===
Peter saw and reviewed Ian Charleson's extraordinary Hamlet at the National Theatre in late 1989. Unbeknownst to the audience, Charleson performed it during the last weeks of his life while he was seriously ill with AIDS, and died in January 1990 at the age of 40 eight weeks after his final performance. In November 1990, in memory of Charleson's fine performance, Peter established the annual Ian Charleson Award, to recognise and reward the best classical stage performance by an actor under age 30. The awards are jointly sponsored by The Sunday Times and the National Theatre, where they are held. Recipients receive a cash prize, as do runners-up and third-place winners.

Upon founding the awards, Peter noted:

Classical work is the solid bedrock of all acting. It is classical acting, with its twin demands of psychological perception and formal excellence, which truly tests and proves the actor's ability and stamina, both physical and mental.

The first annual Ian Charleson Award was presented in January 1991. The awards defined a classic play as one written prior to 1900; this cut-off was eventually extended to 1918. The awards are presented at a friendly, low-key private luncheon at one of the restaurants at the National Theatre. There is no filming and no outside press, and there are no acceptance speeches; the awards are attended however by Britain's theatre royalty, who take great interest in preserving the foundations of their profession. Prize recipients and shortlist nominees receive a plaque signed by the judges, who usually number four and until 2017 always included Peter.

As the founding judge of the Ian Charleson Awards, Peter was appointed Member of the Order of the British Empire (MBE) in the 2019 Birthday Honours for services to theatre.

== Personal life ==
In 1978 Peter married Linette Perry (née Purbi), a writer and painter; she died in 2012. In 2013 he married novelist and playwright Judith Burnley.

Peter died on 3 July 2020, at the age of 81.

His brief memoir, How I Became an Englishman, was published in early 2021 by Salamander Street.

== Bibliography ==
- Peter, John. Vladimir's Carrot: Modern Drama and the Modern Imagination. London: André Deutsch, 1987. ISBN 0233980148
