= Shakespeare at the Tobacco Factory =

Theatre company

- Formation: 2000
- Type: Theatre Company
- Purpose: Shakespeare and Classic drama
- Headquarters: The Tobacco Factory, Raleigh Road, Bristol
- Region served: Bristol / England
- Website: stf-theatre.org.uk

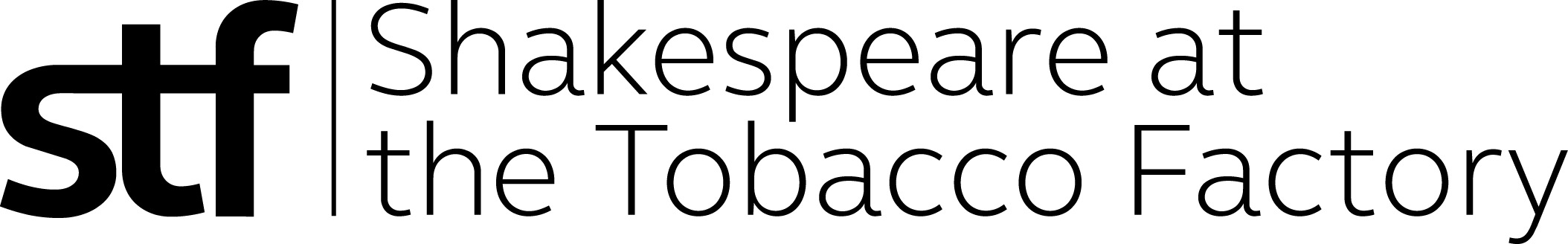

Shakespeare at the Tobacco Factory is a professional theatre company based at the Tobacco Factory in Bristol, England. It was founded by Andrew Hilton in 1999, with the initial aim of producing two Shakespeare plays between mid February and May each year. The plan was to operate without subsidy, seeking instead sponsorship and using an ensemble of actors recruited or each season. Hilton, an established actor, had spent ten years teaching the craft of Shakespearean theatre at the Bristol Old Vic Theatre School.

== History ==
In 2000, the company's first season consisted of productions of King Lear and A Midsummer Night's Dream. These were well received by critics such as Toby O'Connor Morse of The Independent, who commented on Lear: "One of the finest productions of Shakespeare – or any other playwright for that matter – seen in Bristol in years". On A Midsummer Night's Dream, Lyn Gardner of The Guardian commented:

Andrew Hilton's brilliantly clear, beautifully simple production is played on an almost totally bare rectangular space with the audience sitting on three sides. Yet despite its minimalism, it conjures up a rare sense of enchantment, creating the feeling that it would be easy to slip between the parallel worlds of humans and fairies. To do this with just a single strand of fairy lights, music and unaccompanied voices is something of an achievement.

For the 2001 season, the company paired Measure for Measure with Coriolanus. Both productions were well received; Susannah Clapp of The Observer, reviewing Measure for Measure, stated:

More and more it seems the best theatre is happening outside theatre buildings. Take the company called Shakespeare at the Tobacco Factory. Just over a year ago its artistic director Andrew Hilton commandeered an industrial building once central to Bristol's financial prosperity. .... He is eliciting luminous performances, producing forceful, distinctly articulated Shakespeare.

and on Coriolanus, Jeremy Kingston of The Times described the company as "one of the most exciting theatre companies in the land."

For their third season, The Winter's Tale accompanied Twelfth Night. John Peter of The Sunday Times said of The Winter's Tale, "The costumes are striking and the props are few. Hilton's production, with the audience on four sides, is clean, clear and swift." and Lyn Gardner on Twelfth Night described the production style:

Hilton .... is a plain cook, whose unadorned approach – no concept, the barest stage possible, music used sparingly – pays dividends, largely because the acting has a telescopic clarity. Every emotion seems magnified, particularly in this production, in which laughter and tears mingle and the losers as much as the lovers take centre stage. This is comedy with an ache in its heart.

The 2003 season productions of Troilus and Cressida and As You Like It were praised by critics, who noted that they "differ both from the RSC showcase efforts and the worthy but often laboured school curriculum ad-hoc companies." and

It is tiresome to have to use a small, unsubsidised company in the suburbs of Bristol to beat the great RSC about the head, but one lesson Boyd and his team might learn from the Tobacco Factory's As You Like It is that it is time to return to basics. Stop spending money on big, ugly sets. Concentrate your (and the audience's) mind on the space, the actors, the words. If you have spare money, spend it on costumes. Those were the priorities of the Elizabethan managers.

2004 brought an end to the initial five-year plan, with productions of Macbeth and Middleton's The Changeling, which, after a spring run in Bristol, transferred to the Barbican Centre in London for a five-week run in the autumn.

In May 2004 the company was reborn as a charity as it now continues, named Shakespeare at the Tobacco Factory 2004 Limited. This new status allowed charitable donations and an element of subsidy to be sought. In subsequent years the company has produced many more Shakespeare plays, as well as Anton Chekhov's The Cherry Orchard and Uncle Vanya, and Molière's The Misanthrope. Jonathan Miller was guest director for a 2008 production of Hamlet. Polinina Kalinina joined the company as the second guest director in 2015 for the production of Romeo and Juliet.
