= Mariah Gale =

British actress (born c. 1980)

Mariah Gale (born c.1980) is a British actress of film, stage and television.

== Early life ==
She was born in Australia to an Australian mother and British father, both architects. She grew up in her father's native United Kingdom. She studied at University of Birmingham and the Guildhall School of Music and Drama.

== Career ==
Gale was a member of The Royal Shakespeare Company's 2009–2011 ensemble. The critic Michael Coveney described her as "brilliant at the adolescent sulkiness of Juliet".

== Awards ==
She won the 2006 Ian Charleson Award for her performances in Twelfth Night and 'Tis Pity She's a Whore.

== Credits ==
- Game of Thrones: The Mad King (2026, Royal Shakespeare Theatre, Stratford-Upon-Avon) as Queen Rhaella Targaryen / Lady Shella Whent.
- Henry VI: Open Rehearsal Project, Henry VI: Rebellion, Wars of the Roses and Richard III (2022, RSC) as Margaret
- Doctor Who (2017) as Eliza, episode "Knock Knock"
- Broadchurch (2017) as Caroline Hughes, series 3
- Wendy & Peter Pan (2022, RSC) as Wendy
- Father Brown (2017) as Agnes Lesser, episode 5.7 "The Smallest of Things"
- Shakespeare Live! (2016, RSC and BBC2 live broadcast) as Juliet (Romeo and Juliet extract)
- The Hollow Crown (2016, BBC) as Lady Bona
- Wendy & Peter Pan (2015, RSC) as Wendy
- Measure For Measure (2015, The Globe, London) as Isabella
- Cat On A Hot Tin Roof (2014, Royal Exchange, Manchester)
- Hercules: The Legend Begins (2014)
- Death Comes to Pemberley (2013) as Mrs Younge
- Proof (2013, Menier Chocolate Factory) as Catherine
- Three Sisters (2012, Young Vic) as Olga
- The Pitchfork Disney (2012, Arcola Theatre) as Hayley
- Morte d'Arthur (2010, RSC) as Ettard/ Elaine of Astolat/ Morgan's gentlewoman
- Romeo and Juliet (2010, RSC) as Juliet
- The Grain Store (2009, RSC) as Masha
- Hamlet (2009, TV) as Ophelia
- The Comedy of Errors (2009, RSC) as a courtesan
- As You Like It (2009, RSC) as Celia (understudying Rosalind)
- The Diary of Anne Frank (2009, TV series) as Bep Voskuijl
- Hamlet (2008, RSC) as Ophelia
- Love's Labour's Lost (2008, RSC) as the Princess of France
- A Midsummer Night's Dream (2008, RSC) as 1st Fairy
- Skins (2008, TV series) guest starring as Polly
- The Sea (2008, Theatre Royal, Haymarket) as Rose
- Oliver Twist (2007, miniseries) as Agnes Fleming
- Mad King Ludwig (2007, Rose Bruford) (rehearsed reading) as Henriette/ Cosima Wagner
- Vernon God Little (2007, Young Vic Theatre) as Talyor/ Ella
- Professor Bernhardi (2007, BBC Radio 3) as Nurse Ludmilla
- Regime Change (2007, BBC Radio 3) as Natascha
- The Tempest (2006–7, RSC) as Miranda
- Julius Caesar (2006, RSC) as Portia
- Antony and Cleopatra (2006–7, RSC) as Octavia
- Passion and Politics (2005, Young Vic) (rehearsed reading)
- 'Tis Pity She's a Whore (2005, Southwark Playhouse) as Annabella
- Cymbeline (2005, Regent's Park open-air theatre)
- Twelfth Night (2005, Regent's Park open-air theatre) as Viola
- Musik (2005, Arcola Theatre) as Klara
- Professor Bernhardi (2005, Arcola Theatre) as Nurse Ludmilla
- The Night (2005, BBC Radio 3) (poetry reading)
- Much Ado About Nothing (2004, Shakespeare's Globe) as Hero
- The Lost Child (2003–04, Chichester Festival Theatre)
- Stealing Sweets and Punching People (2003, Latchmere Theatre) as Emily
- Loveplay (2003, Finborough Theatre)
- Broken (2000, Hen & Chickens Theatre)
