= Rebecca Stott =

British writer (born 1964)

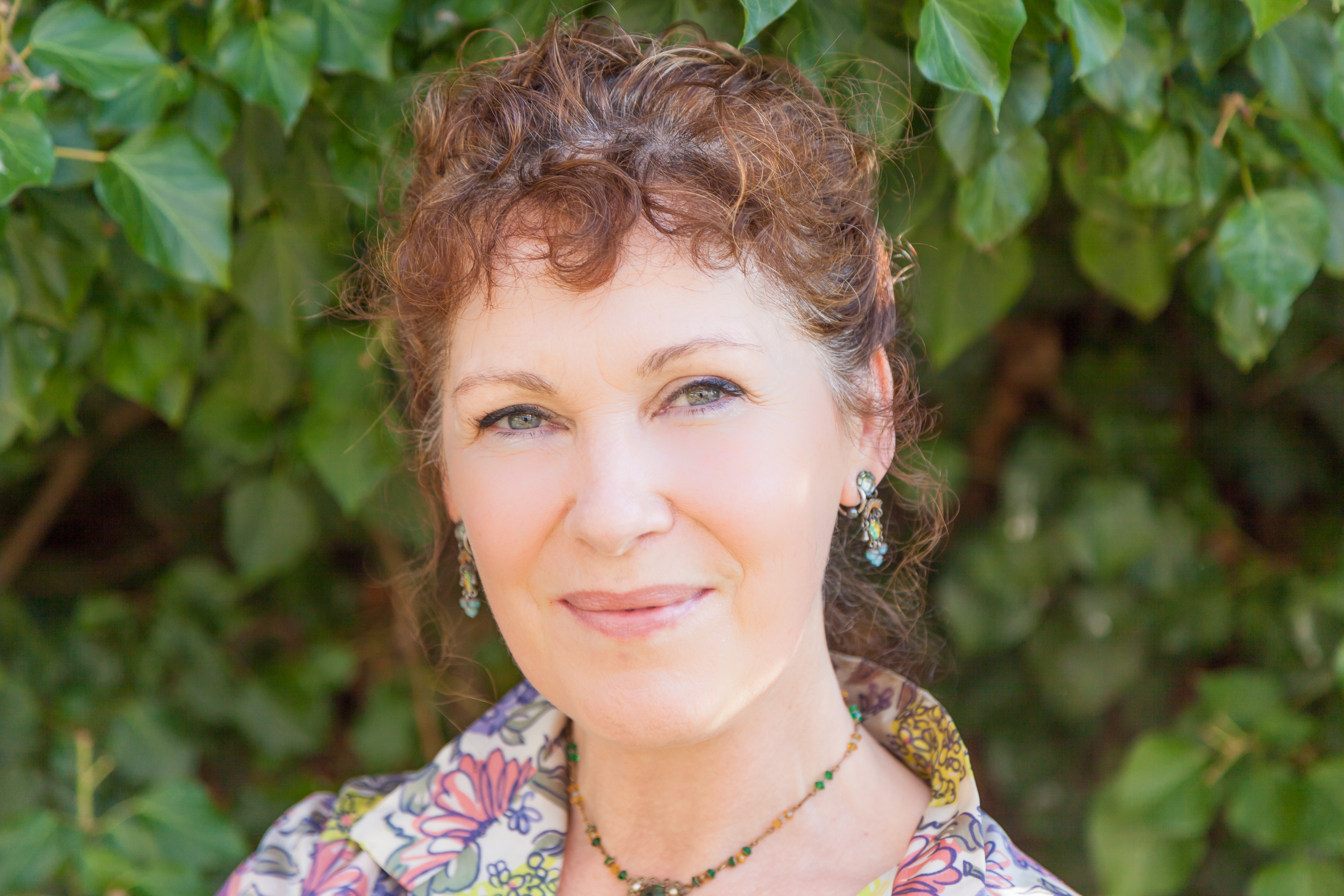
- Stott, 2017
- Born: 1964 (age 61–62); Cambridge, England
- Education: PhD, University of York
- Occupations: Writer, broadcaster, university professor
- Children: 3, including Hannah Morrish
- Writing career
- Genres: Historical fiction and non-fiction
- Website: rebeccastott.co.uk

Rebecca Stott (born 1964) is a British writer and broadcaster and, until her retirement from teaching in 2021, was Professor of Literature and Creative Writing at the University of East Anglia. She was elected a Fellow of the Royal Society of Literature in 2021.

She is the author of fourteen books which include three novels, a biography of Charles Darwin and a 2,200-year history of Darwin's predecessors. Her second most recent book In the Days of Rain (2017), a memoir giving an account of her childhood growing up in the Exclusive Brethren, won the 2017 Costa Book Award in the Biography category.

She is a regular broadcaster on the BBC Radio 4 programme A Point of View and has also written and produced a number of radio essays for the station.

== Early life ==
Stott was born in Cambridge in 1964, the fourth generation of her family to be born into the Exclusive Brethren, a strictly separatist branch of the Plymouth Brethren with about 45,000 members worldwide. The Brethren, who have since renamed themselves the Plymouth Brethren Christian Church, seek to live separately from the rest of the world because they believe that it is ruled by Satan. During the 1960s, when Stott was growing up, the cult forbade its members to make use of newspapers, television, cinema, radio, universities, wristwatches and cameras. It required women to be entirely subject to their husbands and controlled every aspect of members' lives.

Stott's family left the sect in the 1970s after a sexual scandal involving the world leader, the Man of God, split the movement and when her family broke away to join a new splinter group. They left the Brethren altogether in 1972.

== Education and career ==
Stott won a scholarship to Brighton and Hove High School in 1976. She then studied English and Art History at the University of York, then studied for a Master of Arts and a PhD also at York. She has taught at the University of York, University of Leeds, Anglia Ruskin University in Cambridge and as Professor of Literature and Creative Writing at the University of East Anglia in Norwich.

She has given various lectures, primarily around her literary work on Charles Darwin, as a visiting scholar at a number of universities, including the University of Cambridge, Heidelberg University and the University of Toulouse.

Stott retired from teaching in 2021, but remains Emeritus Professor in the School of Literature, Drama and Creative Writing at the University of East Anglia. She is also an affiliated scholar at the Department of the History and Philosophy of Science at the University of Cambridge.

== Fiction ==
Stott's debut novel, Ghostwalk (2007) was shortlisted for the Jelf Group First Novel Award and the Authors' Club Best First Novel Award. Lydia Brooke is called upon to be the ghostwriter of a book on Sir Isaac Newton's alchemy. Brooke comes to suspect that the death of the book's author, Cambridge historian Elizabeth Vogelsang, may somehow relate to a series of unsolved seventeenth-century murders. The novel, an innovative mix of fiction and non-fiction, blends seventeenth-century accounts of plague, glassmaking, alchemy and theories of optics with a contemporary plot involving quantum physics and animal rights campaigns. The New York Times reviewer called it "Mesmerizing . . . Ghostwalk has an all-too-rare scholarly authority and imaginative sparkle" and compared it to the works of Borges and Edgar Allan Poe. The Independent in 2012 chose it as one of ten best ghost novels.

Stott's second novel, The Coral Thief, set in 1815 post-Napoleonic France, is a thriller that explores religion, rationalism, and evolutionary theory while its hero, a medical student, becomes drawn into a daring jewel heist. It was serialised on Radio Four's Book at Bedtime in January 2010. Kate Williams in the Financial Times described it as "an intellectual thriller, a book of penetrating humanity and a vivid evocation of Paris in the wake of Bonaparte's defeat".

Stott's third novel, Dark Earth, was published by 4th Estate in the US and the UK in June 2022. It was shortlisted for the 2023 Historical Writers Association (HWA) Gold Crown Award. Dark Earth is set in the sixth century in the ruined Roman city of Londinium. When sisters, Isla and Blue, on the run from local warlords, seek refuge in the abandoned city and find there a community of women refugees, they have to fight for their survival when the warlords track them down. Alex Preston, writing for The Observer called it: "radically new and beautiful, a book that retells a period of our national past that straddles the line between history and myth."

== Creative non-fiction ==
Before 2003, Stott published academic books including books on Tennyson, Elizabeth Barrett Browning (with Simon Avery) and other aspects of Victorian culture. Since 2003 she has published books of creative non-fiction which explore the boundaries between literature, intellectual history and the history of science. Darwin and the Barnacle (Faber, 2003) tells the story of Darwin's obsession with breaking the riddle of a single aberrant barnacle species he had found in a conch shell on a beach in Southern Chile and which led him to complete an enormous work of barnacle taxonomy while his revolutionary work on natural selection lay locked away in a drawer.

In 2012 she published a book about the history of evolution before Darwin. Darwin's Ghosts: The Secret History of Evolution was published in the UK by Bloomsbury Publishing and in the US by Spiegel and Grau in May 2012. The book appeared on the New York Times 100 Notable Books of 2012.

== Memoir ==
In June 2017, Stott published In the Days of Rain, a family memoir about growing up in the Exclusive Brethren a group who now call themselves the Plymouth Brethren Christian Church, a secretive and separatist Christian fundamentalist cult. It won the 2017 Costa Book Awards in the Biography category. Francis Spufford, author of Golden Hill, described it as 'A marvellous, strange, terrifying book', and Mark Mills, author of The Savage Garden, as 'Truly magnificent: a big, beautiful, brutal, and tender masterpiece. A deeply affecting human story that also goes to the dark heart of who we are and how the world works'. The Times reviewer described it as 'furious and compassionate'.

Soon after In the Days of Rain was published, Massimo Introvigne, Turin sociologist of religion and director of the Center for Studies on New Religions (CESNUR) reviewed the memoir at considerable length in his organisation's self-published journal CESNUR. Introvigne and his group argue that groups like the Jehovah's Witnesses, The Plymouth Brethren Christian Church and Scientologists are not cults but are instead 'new religions' that are victimised and must be defended. Introvigne, who has several times defended cults in legal settings as an expert witness, argues that brainwashing is a myth. Introvigne's largely critical review of In the Days of Rain appeared immediately on the Plymouth Brethren Christian Church's website as evidence that the memoir had been 'discredited'. Despite Stott's scholarly historical research, her use of her father's large archive of private Brethren materials and his extensive firsthand witness, as well as her interviews with many eyewitnesses, Introvigne questioned the reliability of Stott’s account, noting that she left the Exclusive Brethren at age seven. He also accused her of relying on "anti-Brethren literature". Introvigne cited 'errors', describing Stott’s account of the group's 'breaking of bread' as a form of transubstantiation and a confusion between biblical figures Job and Jonah as 'gross theological inaccuracies'. Despite Stott's use of many eyewitness accounts, Introvigne, in line with Brethren official accounts, also challenged the accuracy of allegations made against Brethren leader James Taylor Jr., citing legal retractions and court settlements in the Netherlands that found key accusations were 'fabricated'.

== Radio broadcasting ==
Alongside her work in writing and academia, Stott has had a long career in radio broadcasting. In 2003, she was commissioned by BBC Radio 4 to write and present a series of three programmes on female palaeontologists, geologists and fossil collectors (including Mary Anning and Margaret Bentinck, Duchess of Portland) titled Forgotten Female Fossilists.

In 2007 she was once again commissioned by BBC Radio 4 to write and present another series, Animal Magic, which explored how various animal species that generally attract disgust from humans - such as cockroaches, leeches and rats - have contributed to society by helping humans make historical, scientific and technological breakthroughs.

In 2018, Stott joined BBC Radio 4's team of regular contributors on its successful A Point of View programme, which features short weekly radio essays, typically less than 10 minutes long, in which prominent thinkers reflect on and explore a particular topic. Stott presented numerous times on the show before it ended in 2025 due to budget cuts at the station. Her contributions spanned reflections on a number of serious topics such as human grief, climate change and the Russo-Ukrainian war, but also more light-hearted essays on topics such as taxidermy, her quest to find the 'perfect apple' and how she took inspiration from nature to choose a colour of paint for the hallway in her house.

Stott's essay on her mother's Kenwood mixer, a tribute to her mother's resilience in difficult times told through a return to the 1970s kitchen of her childhood, was selected by the BBC to be repeated on the day of Prince Philip, The Duke of Edinburgh's Funeral in April 2021.

Following the closure of A Point of View by the BBC in 2025, Stott was commissioned to write and broadcast two five-episode series for BBC Radio 4 under their new non-fiction writing category. The first series, Beautiful Strangeness (2025), focused on how magic and wonder can unexpectedly be found in mundane daily life. The second series, A Meditation on Mud (2026), explored the importance of mud to human history, culture and science throughout time.

== Personal life ==
Stott lives in Sussex. She has three adult children, one of whom is the actress Hannah Morrish.

== Selected works ==
- The Fabrication of the Late Victorian Femme Fatale, 1992
- Tennyson, 1996
- Elizabeth Barrett Browning (with Simon Avery), 2003
- Oyster, 2003
- Theatres of Glass: The Woman Who Brought the Sea to the City, 2003
- Darwin and the Barnacle, 2003
- Ghostwalk, 2007
- The Coral Thief, 2009
- Darwin's Ghosts: The Secret History of Evolution, 2012
- In The Days of Rain, 2017
- Dark Earth, 2022
