= Tobacco Factory Theatre =

Theatre in Bristol

Coordinates: 51.4423°N 2.6135°W

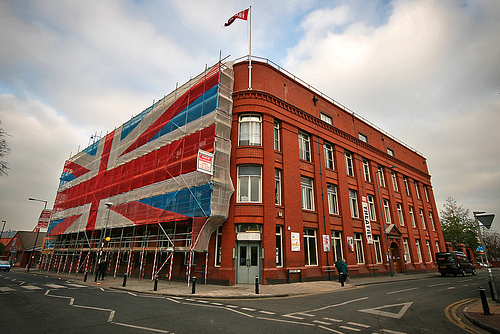
An image of Tobacco Factory Theatre

Tobacco Factory Theatres is located on the first floor of the Tobacco Factory building on the corner of North Street and Raleigh Road, Southville in Bristol, England.

The venue has two performance spaces - The Spielman Theatre (a flexible studio space for up to 72 people) and The Factory Theatre (the main house consisting of a studio-style space with a low ceiling and fixed grid with structural pillars which intrude into the acting area). There is also a bar/foyer area, meeting rooms and Box Office.

The main theatre can seat up to 350 people, although usually it has a capacity of about 250.

The programme includes classic and contemporary theatre, comedy, dance, puppetry, film, opera, music and family shows. In 2012 over 100,000 people came through the theatre doors and the theatre is regularly attracting national critical acclaim.

== History ==
Tobacco was the main industry in South Bristol from the beginning of the twentieth century and at its peak around 40% of the local workforce worked in the Imperial Tobacco Factory. The relocation of Imperial Tobacco in the 1980s was devastating to the local area, causing massive unemployment and deprivation. The Tobacco Factory building itself fell into disrepair but was renewed from the late 1990s when George Ferguson acquired the building, inviting Show of Strength Theatre Company to use part of the first floor as a theatre space. The building became a mixed-use cultural space with a café-bar and a 250-seat studio theatre, under the name of Tobacco Factory Theatre.

In 2005 the Tobacco Factory Theatres became a charitable trust and in 2007 it became a Key Arts Provider of Bristol City Council. It has expanded since 2008. It has made several capital improvements, including the installation of a renewable energy system. The theatre regularly attracts national critical acclaim. and has strong relationships with many individual artists, with venues and with theatre companies.

It is particularly well known for productions by Shakespeare at the Tobacco Factory, inhouse family-friendly productions and a comedy line-up, as well as classic and contemporary theatre, dance, puppetry, film, opera and music.

The theatre was redesigned in 2013 and has become one of the UK's few Theatre-in-the-Round auditoria, increasing the maximum seating capacity to 350, with improved comfort and sightlines. The theatre can still be used for end stage and thrust stage performance.

The current artistic director is Heidi Vaughan, appointed in 2022.

== Inhouse Productions ==
=== 2026 ===
- Macbeth

=== 2025 ===
- Cosi Fan Tutte (Co-production with Opera Project)
- Rapunzel: A Hairy Tale

=== 2024 ===
- The Marriage Of Figaro (Co-production with Opera Project)
- The Winters' Tale
- Hansel And Gretel (Co-production with New International Encounter)

=== 2023 ===
- Oliver Twist

=== 2022 ===
- Revealed
- The Snow Queen (Co-production with New International Encounter & Cambridge Junction)

=== 2021 ===
- Oz (Co-production with Pins and Needles)

=== 2019 ===
- Snow White (Co-production with New International Encounter & Cambridge Junction)

=== 2018 ===
- The Borrowers (Co-production with New International Encounter & Cambridge Junction)

=== 2017 ===
- Beauty And The Beast (Co-production with New International Encounter & Cambridge Junction)

=== 2016 ===
- Cinderella: A Fairy Tale (Co-production with Travelling Light)

=== 2015 ===
- The Light Princess (In association with Peepolykus)

=== 2014 ===
- 101 Dalmations (Co-production with Travelling Light)

=== 2013/2014 ===
- The Last Voyage of Sinbad the Sailor (Co-production with Travelling Light)

=== 2012/2013 ===
- Hansel and Gretel (Co-production with NIE)
- The Lost Present
- The Room in the Elephant (Co-production with Oran Mor)
- Faith Fall (Co-production with Oran Mor)
- Made in Heaven (produced by Mark Bruce Company in association with Tobacco Factory Theatre)

=== 2011/2012 ===
- Cinderella: A Fairytale (Co-production with Travelling Light)

=== 2010/2011 ===
- The Adventures of Pinocchio

=== 2009/2010 ===
- Ali Baba and The Forty Thieves (Co-production with Travelling Light)

=== 2008/2009 ===
- A Christmas Carol

=== 2007/2008 ===
- The Ugly Duckling (Co-production with Travelling Light)
- Alice Through The Looking Glass
- Topless Mum (Co-production with Imagineer Productions)

== Funding ==
Tobacco Factory Theatres receives approximately seven percent of its funding from public sources such as the Arts Council of England. They raise approximately 85% of their income through box office receipts, bar sales, workshops and space hire. They offer various levels of membership on which they rely to allow the theatre to produce high-quality work.

The theatre is recognised by Bristol City Council as a key arts provider. The theatre received funding from the Arts Council of England for the first time in 2007.

== See also ==
- List of theatres in Bristol
