= Henry VI (play) =

Collection of three Shakespeare plays on the life of Henry VI of England

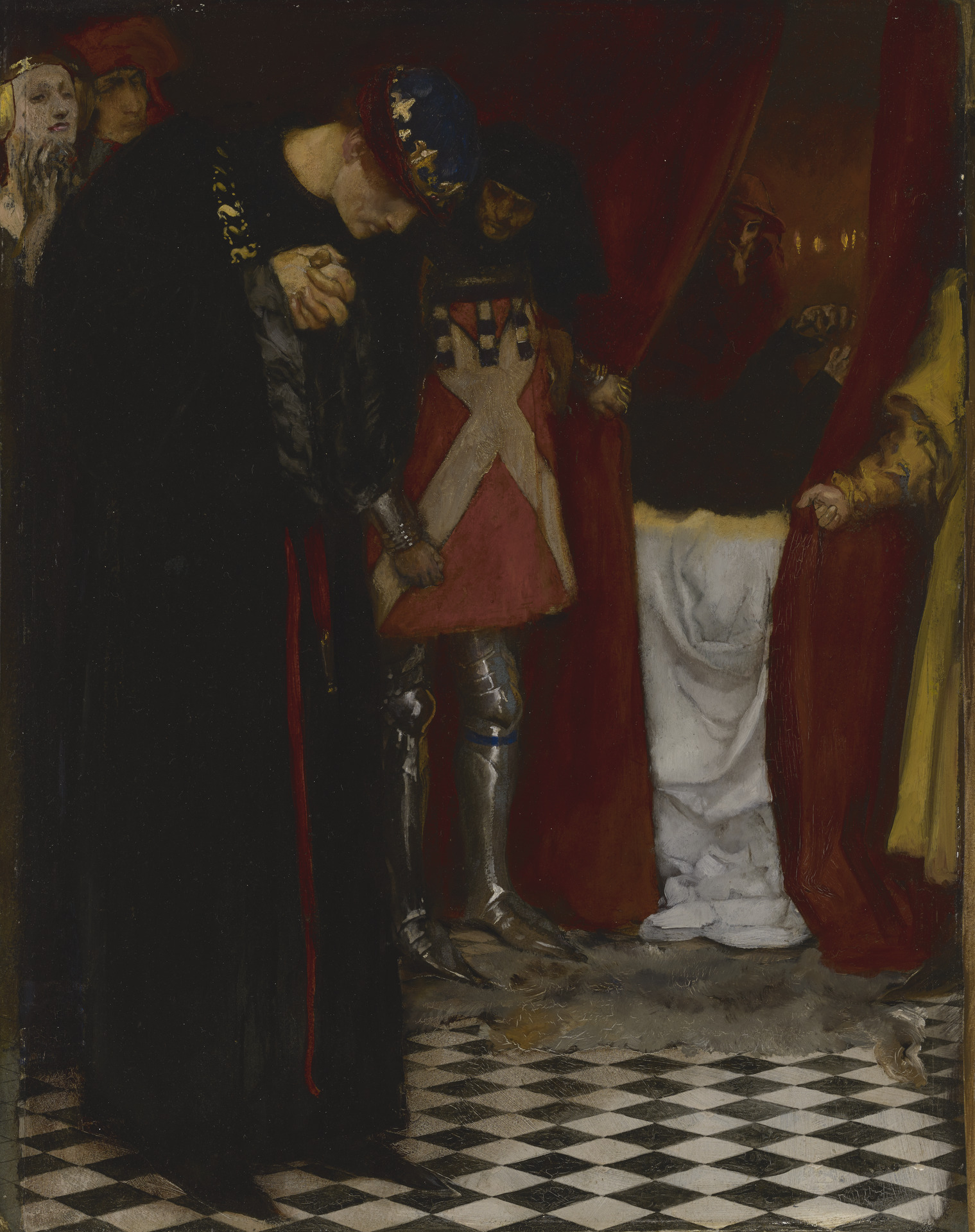
Depiction of Act III scene II of Henry VI by Edwin Austin Abbey

Henry VI is a trilogy of history plays by William Shakespeare, set during the lifetime of King Henry VI of England. Henry VI, Part 1 deals with the loss of England's French territories and the political machinations leading up to the Wars of the Roses, as the English political system is torn apart by personal squabbles and petty jealousy; Henry VI, Part 2 depicts the King's inability to quell the bickering of his nobles, and the inevitability of armed conflict; and Henry VI, Part 3 deals with the horrors of that conflict.

== Plot summary ==
=== Part 1 ===
Henry VI opens with the funeral of King Henry V. The new king, Henry VI, is only an infant, ensuring power is divided among bickering regents and overprotective ministers. Taking advantage of the English government's consequential vulnerability, the French launch a ruthless rebellion under the command of the Dauphin Charles and a mystical peasant girl, Joan la Pucelle (Joan of Arc). Lord Talbot, a gallant English general, defends England's territories to measly domestic support. Back in London, a legal dispute in a garden forces the kingdom's nobles to firmly take sides. They pluck roses to symbolise their chosen allegiances: white roses for Richard of York (the House of York), and red roses for the Duke of Somerset (the House of Lancaster). Court infighting comes to a head when York and Somerset both refuse to reinforce Talbot in sheer spite. Consequently, Talbot and his son are slain at Bordeaux. The English manage to capture and burn Joan of Arc at the stake. The Earl of Suffolk persuades the now-adult, pious, and naive King Henry to marry a penniless French princess, Margaret of Anjou, establishing a weary peace with France but a harbinger for future upheaval.

=== Part 2 ===
In England, the young King Henry is wholly incapable of managing a court rife with treachery. Queen Margaret arrives and connives with Suffolk, covertly her lover, to sideline the King's uncle and Lord Protector, the Duke of Gloucester. They frame Gloucester's ambitious wife as a witch, forcing her into exile and stripping Gloucester of the Protectorate before having him murdered. With Gloucester gone, Richard, Duke of York, secretly accrues support for his claim to the crown, aligning himself with the powerful Earl of Warwick (nicknamed the "Kingmaker"). Seeking to uproot the government, York incites a violent, populist peasant uprising under a surrogate leader, Jack Cade. Cade's forces briefly concern London before the rebellion is violently crushed. Recognising the crown's extreme frailty, York explicitly declares war on his Lancastrian cousins. The play concludes at the First Battle of St Albans, where Somerset is killed in a decisive victory for the Yorkists, prompting the King and Queen to flee into exile.

=== Part 3 ===
Victorious, the Duke of York corners King Henry in London. The desperate Henry makes a deal with York: he will remain king at the cost of disinheriting his own son in favour of York. Outraged by Henry's arrangement, Queen Margaret raises a Lancastrian army. At the Battle of Wakefield, she captures York, mocks him with a paper crown, and fatally stabs him. York's eldest son, Edward IV, takes up his father’s cause. Receiving heavy backing from Warwick, Edward delivers a devastating blow to the Lancastrians at the Battle of Towton. Henry VI is captured and imprisoned in the Tower of London, and Edward IV is crowned King. Despite victory, Edward quickly alienates his greatest ally, Warwick, by reneging a diplomatic French marriage alliance to secretly wed an English widow, Elizabeth Woodville. Incensed, Warwick defects to the Lancastrian cause, allies with Queen Margaret, and even frees Henry VI from prison, reinstating him on the throne. The Yorkists rally their supporters again; Edward IV recaptures the throne, kills Warwick in battle, and defeats Margaret at the Battle of Tewkesbury, where her young son is killed. Finally, Edward's younger brother, Richard, Duke of Gloucester, arrives the Tower of London and assassinates the captive Henry. Edward celebrates the apparent end of conflict and the birth of his son, the future Edward V, oblivious to Gloucester's scheme to seize power himself.

== Analysis ==
Since the seventeenth century, Shakespeare editors and scholars have agreed, although not without dissent (e.g., from Alexander, who maintained that Henry VI, Part 1 was by Shakespeare alone), that the three Henry VI plays were the outcomes of collaborations between two or more playwrights, with Shakespeare's contributions being of varying scope and type. The nature of the collaborations is impossible to ascertain, and which parts may have been written by whom is also a matter of unresolved discussion. Careful analysis of the texts, of known practices of possible collaborators, and of the known performances of the plays, has resulted in some recurring names being suggested. For Henry VI, Part 1, the hands of Thomas Nashe, Christopher Marlowe, Greene and Peele have all been mentioned alongside that of Shakespeare, and there is some evidence to support some contributions from all of these, or any combination of these. John Dover Wilson's influential Preface to his 1952 edition of the play provides what remains, perhaps, the most thorough-going overview of all previous scholarship on the matter. His investigation leads him to suggest Nashe, Greene (with or without Peele) and Shakespeare as the coauthors and revisers of the play.

In 2016, scholars working on the New Oxford Shakespeare editions, and able to analyse the newly digitalised texts, found that 17 plays out of 44 showed Shakespeare as a collaborator; with regard to the Henry VI plays, they announced that they were crediting Shakespeare's colleague and sometime rival, Christopher Marlowe, as one of the co-authors of the trilogy. The Oxford scholars drew their conclusions by using "big data" techniques, using computer software to identify signature language patterns for an author (using a discipline known as stylometrics), and then checking the texts against those signatures.

== Relationship to other plays ==
Although the Henry VI trilogy may not have been written in chronological order, the three plays are often grouped together with Richard III to form a tetralogy, the "minor tetralogy", covering the entire Wars of the Roses saga, from the death of Henry V in 1422 to the rise to power of Henry VII in 1485. It was the success of this sequence of plays which firmly established Shakespeare's reputation as a playwright. The "major tetralogy" or Henriad, covering the previous reigns, were written later.

The three plays were published separately, and have often been performed separately, although they have also been combined in various adaptations into a single play or two plays. Further details about performances and adaptations appear in the articles about the individual plays.
