= Francesca Amewudah-Rivers =

British actress

- Born: 1998 (age 27–28); Brighton, England
- Education: Oxford University
- Occupations: Actress; musician; composer
- Years active: 2021–present

Francesca Amewudah-Rivers is a British actress. She made her West End debut opposite Tom Holland in 2024 as Juliet in Romeo and Juliet, and won the Ian Charleson Award for her performance. She also won the Critics' Circle Theatre Award for Best Newcomer in 2025.

== Early life and education ==
Amewudah-Rivers was born in Brighton to a Ghanaian father and Nigerian mother. She trained at the National Youth Theatre.

She studied music at Oxford University. She was the only black person in her college year group, and set up a society for students of colour, which produced an adaptation of Medea, blending poetry and music.

== Career ==
She appeared in two seasons of the BBC sitcom Bad Education as Blessing, alongside Jack Whitehall. She also composed the music for the short films Medea, Minutes and Messenger. She was awarded the 2021 Evening Standard Future Theatre Award for Audio Design. She was a music intern on Inua Ellams’ adaptation of Chekhov's play Three Sisters for the Royal National Theatre.

On stage, she has appeared in theatre productions of Shakespeare's Macbeth and Othello at the National Youth Theatre, as well as an adaptation of Sophocles' Greek tragedy Antigone at the Mercury Theatre, for which The Guardian positively reviewed her "sensitively delivered" performance.

In 2024, she was cast in her first West End production, as Juliet alongside Tom Holland in Romeo and Juliet at the Duke of York's Theatre. Her casting caused a backlash, described by the play's director Jamie Lloyd as "racial abuse". Over 800 black actors signed an open letter in solidarity with her. Amewudah-Rivers won the Ian Charleson Award for her performance, and in March 2025, she also won the Jack Tinker Award for Best Newcomer at the Critics' Circle Theatre Awards.

== Personal life ==
Amewudah-Rivers is a classical and jazz pianist who also plays guitar, bassoon and djembe drum.

She resides in Brixton.

== Filmography ==
Key
†	Denotes projects that have not yet been released

Year	Title	Role	Notes	Ref.
2022–2024	Bad Education	Blessing	Series regular; 14 episodes	
2023	Jobless	Tai	Short film	
2026	Notice Me	Em	Short film	
TBA	Blue Hour †	Emmy	Post-production	
