= English Touring Theatre =

English Touring Theatre (ETT) is a major touring theatre company based in London, England.

== History ==
English Touring Theatre was founded in 1993 by Stephen Unwin. In 2008, the directorship of the company was taken over by Rachel Tackley, making ETT the first producer-led touring theatre company in the UK. Richard Twyman succeeded Tackley to become the company's Artistic Director in November 2016.

== Awards ==
Awards for English Touring Theatre include:

2016

- Theatre Awards UK Best Touring Production – for The Herbal Bed

2015

- Theatre Awards UK Best Touring Production – for Twelfth Night

2014

- Theatre Awards UK Best Touring Production – for Translations

2012

- Theatre Awards UK Best Touring Production – for Anne Boleyn

2011

- The Public Reviews Best of 2011 Award (joint) – for Tartuffe
- The Stage 100 Awards – Best Producer
- Critics' Awards for Theatre in Scotland Best New Play – for The Three Musketeers and the Princess of Spain
- Critics' Awards for Theatre in Scotland Best Ensemble – for The Three Musketeers and the Princess of Spain

2010

- Theatre Awards UK Renee Stepham Award for Best Presentation of Touring Theatre

== Productions ==
- The Weir (2017)
- Rules For Living (2017)
- Othello (2017)
- William Wordsworth (2017)
- Nell Gwynn (2017)
- Silver Lining (2017)
- Hamlet (2016)
- Lady Chatterley's Lover (2016)
- French Without Tears (2016)
- Brideshead Revisited adapted by Bryony Lavery in the first large-scale stage adaptation of the novel by Evelyn Waugh (2016)
- The Herbal Bed (2016)
- The Odyssey: Missing, Presumed Dead (2015)
- A Mad World, My Masters (2015)
- Arcadia (2015)
- (with Sheffield Theatres) Twelfth Night by William Shakespeare (2014). Directed by Jonathan Munby, designed by Colin Richmond. Toured to: Sheffield Theatres; Grand Theatre, Blackpool; Watford Palace Theatre; Cambridge Arts Theatre; Hall for Cornwall, Truro; Richmond Theatre, Richmond, London; and Theatre Royal, Brighton
- The Misanthrope by Roger McGough after Moliere (2013). Directed by Gemma Bodinetz. Toured to Liverpool Playhouse, Cambridge Arts Theatre, Richmond Theatre, Oxford Playhouse, Hall for Cornwall (Truro), Northcott Theatre (Exeter), Theatre Royal Brighton, Nuffield Theatre (Southampton), The New Wolsey (Ipswich), York Theatre Royal and Theatre Royal Bath
- The Sacred Flame by W. Somerset Maugham (2012). Directed by Matthew Dunster. Toured to: Rose Theatre, Kingston; Northern Stage, Newcastle upon Tyne; Oxford Playhouse; New Wolsey Theatre; Liverpool Playhouse; Yvonne Arnaud Theatre, Guildford; Theatre Royal, Brighton; The Nuffield Theatre Southampton; and Cambridge Arts Theatre
- The Real Thing (play) (2012)
- Anne Boleyn (2012)
- Tartuffe (2011)
- Hundreds and Thousands (2011)
- Eden End (2011)
- Little Baby Jesus (2011)
- Great Expectations (2011)
- The Three Musketeers and the Princess of Spain (2010)
- Lovesong (2010)
- Marine Parade (2010)
- Canary (2010)
- Rum and Coca Cola (2010)
- The Hypochondriac (2009)
- Been So Long (2009)
- The Grapes of Wrath (2009)
- Where There's a Will (2009)
- Entertaining Mr Sloane (2009)
- Far From the Madding Crowd (2008)
- Hello and Goodbye (2008)
- Uncle Vanya (2007)
- The Changeling (2007)
- Someone Else's Shoes (2007)
- French Without Tears (2007)
- Mother Courage and Her Children (2006)
- The Old Country (2006)
- Hamlet (2005)
- Rosencrantz and Guildenstern Are Dead (2005)
- Twelfth Night (2004)
- Honeymoon Suite (2004)
- Romeo and Juliet (2003)
- Anton Chekhov (2003)
- John Gabriel Borkman (2003)
- The Boy Who Fell into a Book (2002)
- King Lear (2002)
- Ghosts (2002)
- The York Realist (2001)
- The Caretaker (2001)
- Fool for Love (2001)
- The Cherry Orchard (2000)
- The Master Builder (1999)
- Don Juan (1999)
- Hushabye Mountain (1999)
- The Taming of the Shrew (1998)
- A Difficult Age (1998)
- Shellfish (1998)
- Measure for Measure (1997)
- The Seagull (1997)
- Design for Living (1997)
- Henry IV Parts I and II (1996)
- The School for Scandal (1996)
- Hedda Gabler (1996)
- Rupert Street Lonely Hearts Club (1995)
- Macbeth (1995)
- The Importance of Being Earnest (1995)
- The School for Wives (1995)
- No Man's Land (1994)
- As You Like It (1994)
- The Beaux' Stratagem (1994)
- A Doll's House (1994)
- A Taste of Honey (1993)
- Hamlet (1993)
- A Midsummer Night's Dream (1993)

== Digital Theatre ==
ETT was one of the organisations which collaborated in the launch of Digital Theatre, a project of recording and distributing theatre performance digitally. The first performance filmed and released was Far From the Madding Crowd.
