= List of theatres in Bristol =

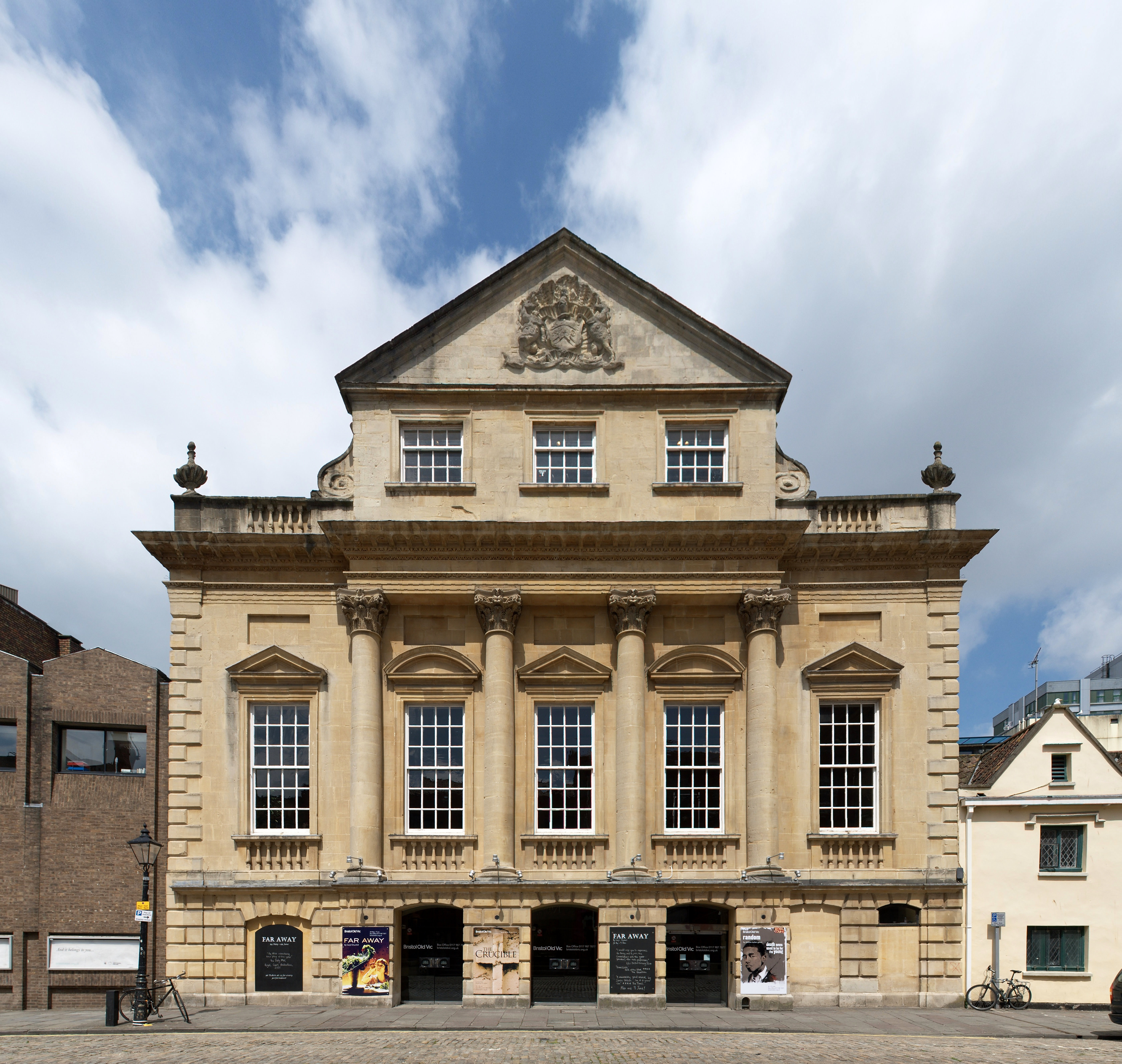
The Cooper's Hall in King Street is the main entrance to the Theatre Royal, home of the Bristol Old Vic.

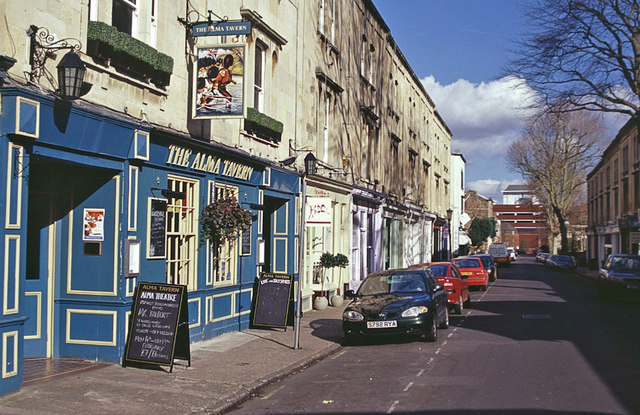
The Alma Tavern, which houses a pub theatre in Clifton

This is a list of theatres in Bristol, England. Listed spaces have been primarily used for theatre in the past or are in current use. Many other spaces in the city have hosted plays.

Early theatrical performances were associated with religious feasts such as Christmas and St Katherine's Day. Schoolboys from St Bartholomew's Hospital are recorded as having performed plays, probably classical drama, in the 16th century. Touring companies such as the Queen's Men, the Admiral's Men and the Lord Chamberlain's Men performed frequently at the guildhall during the 1580s and the 1590s. In the early 17th century, two private playhouses were opened, the Wine Street Playhouse and Redcliffe Hall. Drama historian Mark Pilkington considers this "a situation unique in the provinces." During the period of the Commonwealth (1642–1659) drama was suppressed and playhouses throughout England were closed. In the late 17th century a playhouse was erected in Tucker Street near Bristol Bridge, but there were complaints by clergy and residents and the theatre was closed in 1704 and converted into a Presbyterian meeting house.

In 1729, a new theatre was opened at Jacob's Well by an actor named John Hippisley, who had created the character of Peachum in the premiere of Gay's Beggar's Opera. Lying outside the then city limits, the theatre was safe from the magistrates and it remained in business until, in 1766, the Theatre Royal was opened in King Street. The Theatre Royal has remained in business almost continuously ever since and is claimed to be Britain's oldest working theatre. The New Theatre Royal, later renamed as the Prince's Theatre, was opened in 1867 on Park Row, with a larger stage and auditorium than the King Street premises. In the last decades of the 19th century and the early 20th century a number of music halls were opened but most became cinemas by the mid-20th century. Most Prominent of these is the Bristol Hippodrome, which opened in 1912, and which regularly hosts opera, West End Musicals, dance and variety.

Since the 1970s a number of arts centres and small venues have opened with regular visiting companies and amateur productions. Although funding cuts have led to the closure of venues such as the Albany Centre and the Hope Centre, other venues such as the Alma Tavern Theatre and the Tobacco Factory Theatre have taken their place.

== List ==
Name	Address	Opened	Seats	Use	Notes
1532 Performing Arts Centre	Elton Road, Clifton	2016	245	theatre, musicals, lectures	based on the campus of Bristol Grammar School
Albany Centre	Shaftesbury Avenue, Montpelier	1982	200	theatre, comedy, dance	now an artist led cooperative, used as a rehearsal space
Alhambra Theatre		1870	??	music hall	also known as the Forester's Music Hall, demolished 1900
Alma Tavern Theatre	Alma Vale Road, Clifton	1997	50	pub theatre	an intimate studio theatre, home to Schoolhouse Productions (the in-house company since 2017), and also hosting touring companies such as Bristol Old Vic Theatre School, Red Rope, Hecate Theatre, Awkward Productions, and many more.
Arnolfini	Narrow Quay	1975	209	theatre, live art, dance, film	arts centre, with adjacent galley spaces and bookshop
Bedminster Hippodrome	East Street, Bedminster	1911	??	music hall, theatre	converted into a cinema in 1915
Bierkeller Theatre	All Saints Street	2012	200	theatre, comedy	receiving house, former nightclub Closed 2018.
Brewery Theatre	North Street, Bedminster	2009	90	theatre, comedy	programmed by the Tobacco Factory Theatre
Bristol Hippodrome	St Augustines Parade	1912	1,981	theatre, musicals, comedy, concerts, opera	receiving house operated by Ambassador Theatre Group
Bristol Improv Theatre	St Paul's Road, Clifton	2017	120	theatre, comedy	The first theatre in the South West dedicated to improvisational theatre.
Broadweir Theatre/Vaudeville Theatre/Gem Electric	Broadweir	??	??	music hall	later a boxing club, damaged in the Bristol Blitz, 1941
Canterbury Music Hall	Maryport Street	1855	??	music hall	converted into dining rooms in 1863
Circus of Varieties	Park Row	c. 1890	??	music hall	later a rolling skating rink, cinema and aircraft factory, destroyed in the Bristol Blitz, 1941
Cube Microplex	Kings Square	1969	108	burlesque, performance art, film	formerly the Arts Centre, Kings Square
Empire Theatre	Old Market	1893	1,433	music hall, theatre	converted into a cinema in 1931, demolished in the 1960s
Hen and Chicken	North Street, Bedminster	1988	150	theatre, comedy	has hosted Bristol Old Vic and Show of Strength Theatre Company in the past
Hope Centre	Hope Chapel Hill, Hotwells	1980	220	theatre, dance, comedy, concerts	closed as an arts centre in 2005, but still hosting the Hotwells Pantomime
Jacobs Well Theatre	Jacobs Wells Road	1729	??	theatre	closed 1779
Kuumba	Hepburn Road, St Pauls	1980	130	theatre, comedy, concerts	Afro-Caribbean arts centre, receiving venue
Kelvin Studio, Kelvin Players	253b Gloucester Road, Bishopston	1989	80	theatre, comedy, dance	Mix of professional and non-professional local theatre. Previously the church hall for Bishopston Methodist Church
L Shed	Princes Wharf	1998	600	theatre, conferences	part of the M Shed museum, has hosted Bristol Old Vic and Head, Hearts and Two Fingers productions
Little Theatre	Colston Street	1923	300	theatre	turned into a bar for the Colston Hall in 1980; has since been re-purposed as a music venue (the Lantern).
New Vic	King Street	1972	150	theatre, comedy	studio theatre of the Bristol Old Vic; closed and demolished 2016 to make way for a new foyer building
Park Street Music Hall	Park Street, Clifton	c. 1840	??	music hall	demolished ??
People's Palace/New Palace/Gaumont	Baldwin Street	1892	3,000	music hall, theatre	later a cinema (1912) and nightclub (1974); converted to flats in 2021.
Prince's Theatre	Park Row	1867	2,154	theatre, music hall	destroyed in the Bristol Blitz, 1941
QEH Theatre	Jacobs Well Road, Clifton	1990	202	theatre, comedy, concerts	owned and operated by QEH School
Redcliffe Hall	Redcliffe Hill	c. 1610	??	theatre	mentioned in the will of Sarah Barker, 1637
Redgrave Theatre	Perceval Road, Clifton	1965	320	theatre, comedy, concerts	owned and operated by Clifton College
St Monica Home Theatre	Cote Lane, Westbury-on-Trym	1925	c. 1,000	theatre	located in a nursing home, still occasionally used for performances
Theatre Royal	King Street	1776	500	theatre, comedy, concerts, opera	main house of the Bristol Old Vic
The Thekla	The Grove	1982	150	theatre, comedy and music in the 1980s	now a nightclub
Tivoli Theatre	Broadmead	1870	300	music hall	demolished in 1952
Tobacco Factory Theatre	North Street, Bedminster	1998	240	theatre, comedy	former factory housed, hosting visiting companies with in-house productions
Tucker Street Theatre	Tucker Street	c. 1680	??	theatre	converted into a presbyterian meeting room c.1704
Wardrobe Theatre	West Street, Old Market	2015	100	pub theatre	in a space at the Old Market Assembly since 2015. Previously at the White Bear on St Michael's Hill.
Weston Studio	King Street	2018	188	theatre	new studio theatre of the Bristol Old Vic, located in barrel vaults of Coopers' Hall. Named for sponsors the Garfield Weston Foundation.
Wickham Theatre	Park Row	1964	100	theatre	home of University of Bristol Drama Department
Wine Street Playhouse	Wine Street	1604	??	theatre	built by Nicholas Woolfe, closed 1625
Winston Theatre	Queens Road, Clifton	1965	204	theatre	University of Bristol Union drama space

== See also ==
- Culture in Bristol
- List of theatres in the United Kingdom

== Works cited ==
- Pilkington, Mark C (1997). Records of Early English Drama: Bristol. Toronto: University of Toronto Press. ISBN 0-8020-4221-X.
- Powell, G. Rennie (1919). The Bristol Stage: Its Story. Bristol: Bristol Printing & Publishing Co. Ltd.
- Watts, Guy Tracey (1915). Theatrical Bristol. Bristol: Holloway and Son.
