= Lady Henrietta Hope =

- Born: 1750; Scotland
- Died: 1 January 1786 (aged 35–36); Bristol
- Known for: Philanthropist
- Parent(s): John Hope, 2nd Earl of Hopetoun; Lady Anne Ogilvy

Lady Henrietta Hope (1750 – 1 January 1786) was a British benefactor from Scotland. She was a lifelong friend of chapel builder Willielma Campbell and Hope Chapel in Bristol is named after her.

== Life ==
Hope was born in Scotland. Her parents were Lady Anne (born Ogilvy) and John Hope. Her father was the second earl of Hopetoun. Her mother died when she was a child in 1759. She was from a family of eighteen children although nine of them were half-siblings.

It is said that she decided to become a devoted Christian during a rough crossing from Dover to Calais. She met Willielma Campbell in 1772 and they became good friends. In 1780 they visited London and they met Selina, Countess of Huntingdon.

Campbell spent her time building chapels. She bought a house in Matlock where she and Lady Hope moved to. It became a chapel in 1786. In 1784 they had visited the spa of Hotwells near Bristol where they decided to build a chapel. Hope died in Bristol on 1 January 1786, leaving £2,500 towards a chapel that Campbell agreed to complete. Campbell also died in 1786 so it was Campbell's executor, Lady Maxwell, who completed Hope Chapel that was named for her friend. It was located on Granby Hill in Bristol and it was opened in August 1788.
