= Redcliffe Hall =

Redcliffe Hall may refer to

- Redcliffe Hall, Bristol
- Redcliffe Hall, a former church hall in Redcliffe, Western Australia

== See also ==
- Radcliff Hall (disambiguation)
