= Jane Green (actress) =

British actress

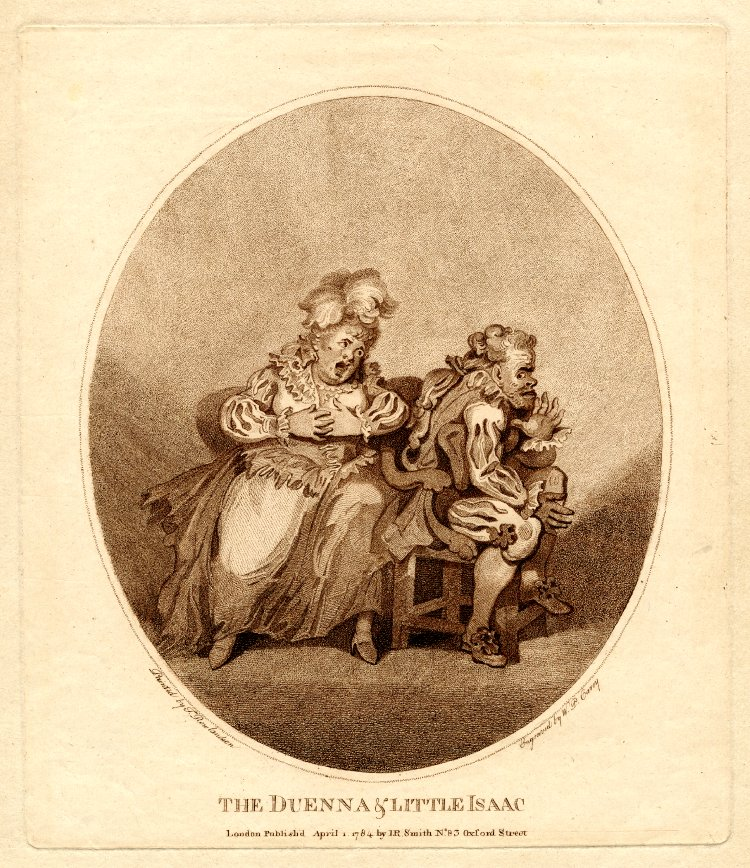
Green and John Quick in The Duenna

Jane Hippisley, subsequently Mrs. Green (1719–1791), was a British actress.

== Life ==
She was born in 1719. She was the daughter of John Hippisley and his wife. She was the sister of Elizabeth Hippisley (-1766) who was a minor actress.

Jane made her first appearance at her father John Hippisley's benefit at Covent Garden Theatre on 18 March 1735 as Cherry in The Stratagem. She was David Garrick's Ophelia in his first season at Goodman's Fields; as Miss Hippisley, the original Kitty Pry in the Lying Valet; Biddy in Miss in Her Teens; and as Mrs. Green, which name she took in 1747–1748, was the first Mrs. Malaprop. It is suggested that she took the name of Mrs. Green to conceal the illegitimate birth of a son. Samuel Cautherley is thought to be her child as the result of a liaison with Garrick. Samuel probably was born in 1747.

Among her characters were Miss Prue, Anne Page, Perdita, Ophelia, Miss Hoyden, Nerissa, Æmilia, Doll Tearsheet, Duenna, and Mrs. Hardcastle. She played in Dublin in 1751–1752, and probably in 1753–1754, and acted the Irish Widow at Bristol as late as 4 July 1781. Behind Mrs. Clive, she would have been the best representative on the stage of old ladies and abigails. Her farewell of the London stage took place 26 May 1780 as Mrs. Hardcastle. She died at her home at Jacob's Well, Bristol in the winter of 1791.

There is a painting of her and another of her father. created by John Hippisley Green.
