= Willielma Campbell =

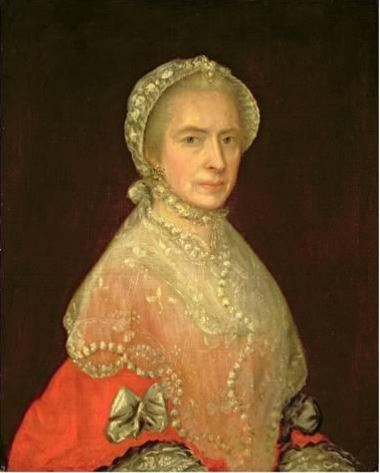
- Known for: Evangelical missionary work
- Born: 1741
- Died: 17 July 1786 (aged 44–45)
- Spouses: John Campbell, Viscount Glenorchy

Willielma Campbell, Viscountess Glenorchy (1741–17 July 1786) was a patroness of evangelical missionary work and founder of several chapels in Scotland, England and Wales.

== Life ==
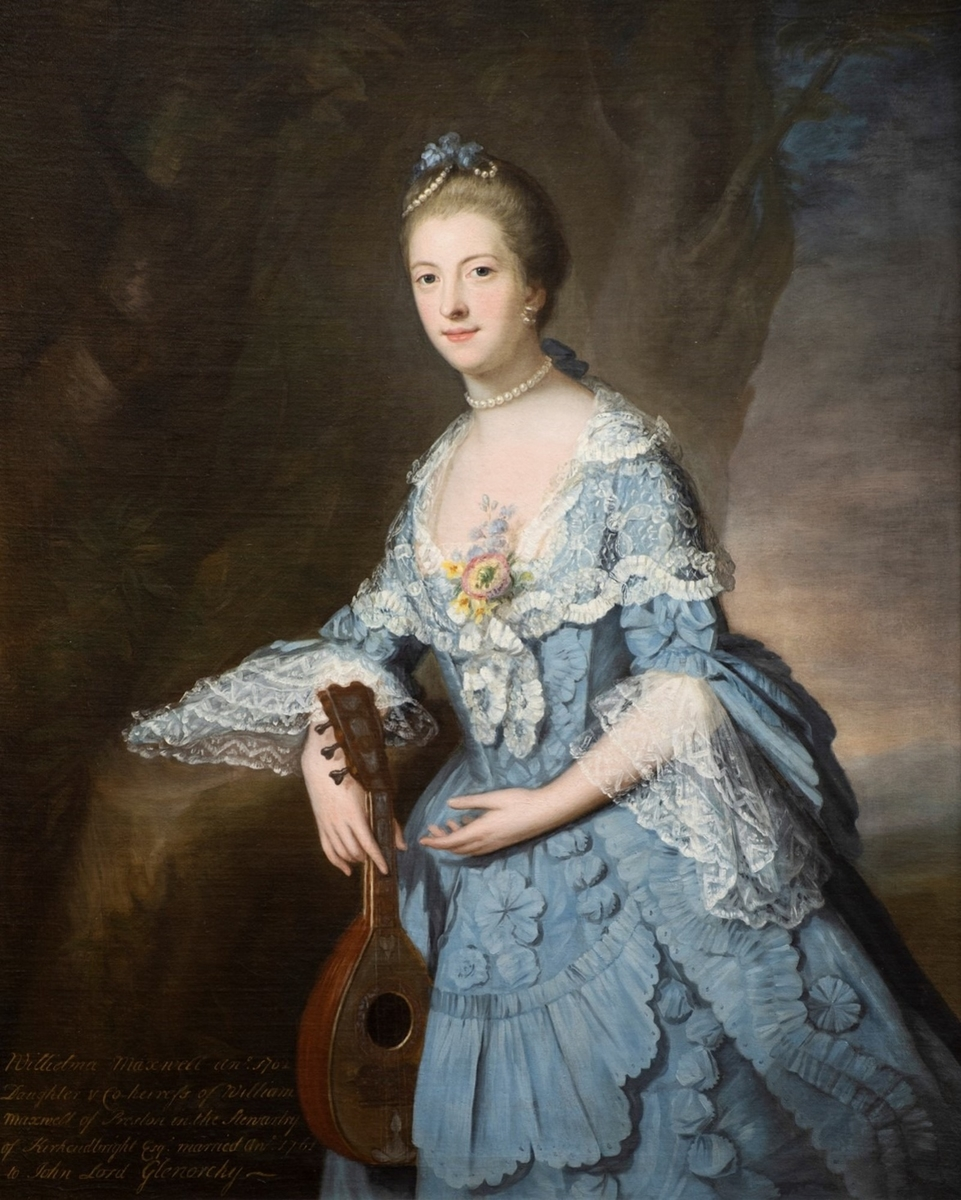
Portrait of Willielma Campbell by Catherine Read, 1762

Willielma Maxwell was born, in Galloway, as the daughter of the wealthy William Maxwell of Preston and Elizabeth Hairstanes. On 26 September 1761, she married John Campbell, Viscount Glenorchy, eldest son of John Campbell, 3rd Earl of Breadalbane and Holland, one of Scotland's wealthiest landowners.

In 1762, Lord Glenorchy inherited the estate and mansion of Great Sugnal in Staffordshire. Lord Breadalbane, Lord Glenorchy's father, had a house in London and apartments in Holyrood Palace in Edinburgh as well as the Castle of Taymouth. After Lady Breadalbane's death, Lord Breadalbane resigned the Taymouth and Holyrood establishments to Lord and Lady Glenorchy and, from that time, Lady Glenorchy was in charge of them.

In 1764, while recovering from illness and staying at Great Sugnal which was near Hawkstone Park, the home of Rowland Hill, (the evangelical Anglican preacher), she came under the influence of his sister, Jane Hill, and experienced a religious conversion.

In 1769, Lord Glenorchy sold Great Sugnal for between £40,000 and £50,000. Lady Glenorchy persuaded her husband to purchase the estate of Barnton, then up for sale by the Duke of Queensberry, providing her with a home four miles from the centre of Edinburgh.

Particularly after her husband's death in 1771, she devoted herself and her wealth to furthering evangelical causes, becoming an influential figure in Scottish Church affairs. She held evangelistic services in her Edinburgh home at Barnton open to both rich and poor, and also established several chapels in both Scotland and England. She influenced many to enter the ministry.

In 1772 she met Lady Henrietta Hope and they travelled together and were lifelong friends.

== Chapels ==
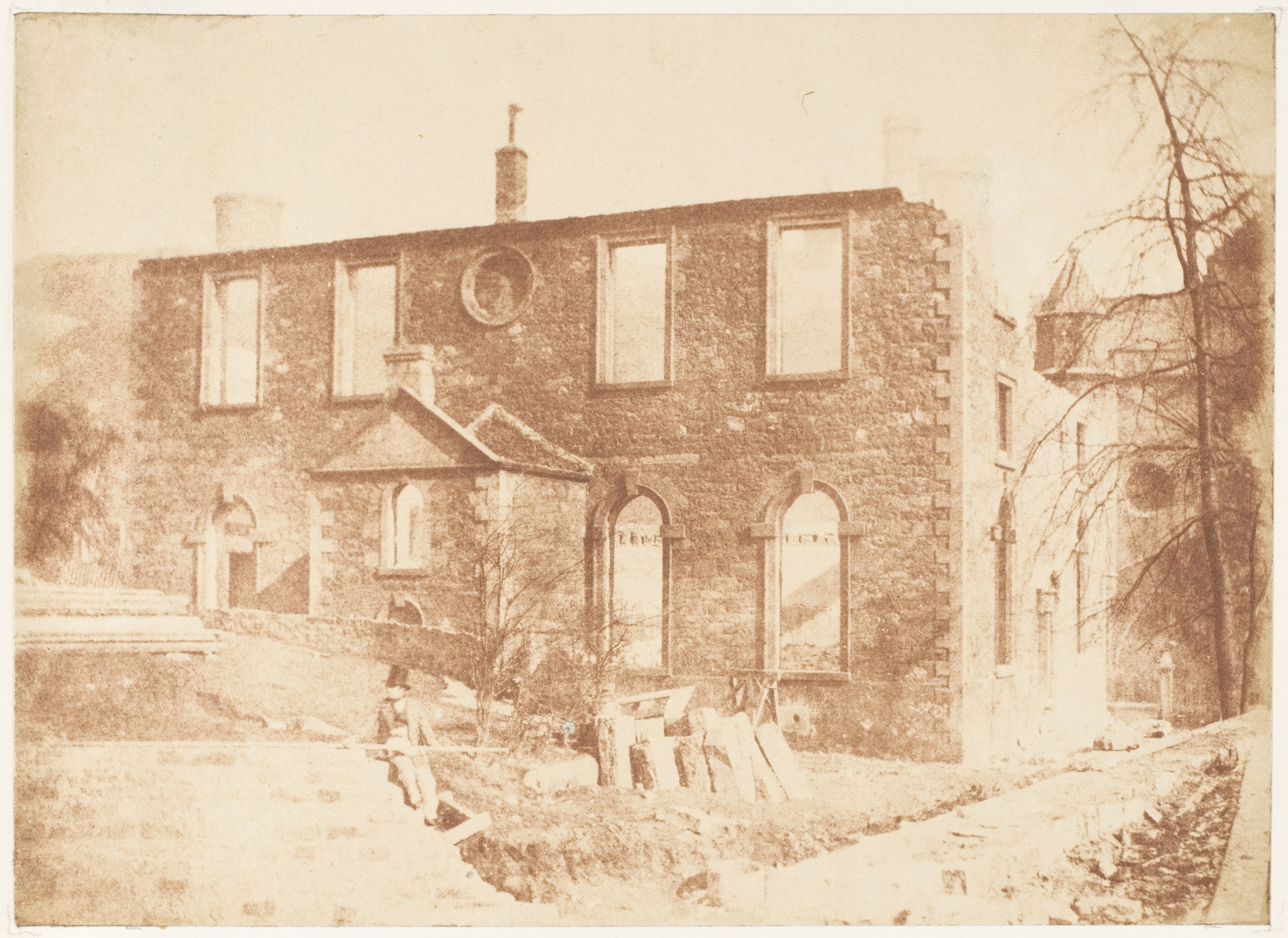
Lady Glenorchy's Church from west (during demolition in 1846/7)

In 1770, advised by Lady Maxwell and Alexander Webster, she set up a place of worship hiring St Mary's Chapel, formerly a Roman Catholic Chapel, in Niddry's Wynd (now Street) in Edinburgh. Her intention was to have services on Sundays and some weekday evenings performed by Presbyterian, Episcopalian and, one day in the week, Wesleyan ministers.

In 1772, soon after she came into her fortune following the death of her husband, Lady Glenorchy decided to found a chapel in Edinburgh with the intention of being in communion with the Church of Scotland. The chapel was intended to serve as an independent place of worship for those, particularly the poor, who could not be accommodated within the existing parish church buildings. Lady Glenorchy decided that "the Orphan-park is the most desirable" and feued part of the Edinburgh Orphan Hospital's grounds which lay between the Old Town and Calton Hill, adjacent to the Trinity College Kirk. In 1772, building of Lady Glenorchy's Church started and was completed in 1774. Lady Glenorchy retained the patronage and management of the church to herself and trustees.

In 1773, Lady Glenorchy renovated the chapel in Strathfillan, Perthshire and, under the auspices of the Society in Scotland for Propagating Christian Knowledge provided an endowment for a minister. She procured two established church missionary preachers to go throughout the Highlands and Islands of Scotland.

Further chapels were constructed in England during her travels in the last ten years of her life. In 1777 there was one in Exmouth and in 1781 one in Carlisle. In 1784 she bought a house in Matlock where she and Lady Hope lived. It became a chapel in 1786. In 1784 they visited Hotwells where Lady Hope pledged £2,500 towards a chapel that Lady Glenorchy agreed to complete. They both died in 1786 so it was Lady Glenorchy's executor who completed Hope Chapel that was named for her friend. A chapel in Workington was also built in 1786.

== Ecumenism ==
Despite the ecumenical nature of her first chapel, Lady Glenorchy retained her Calvinist leanings. In 1771, Lady Glenorchy met with John Wesley, who unsuccessfully attempted to persuade her to join his Methodist movement. She disagreed with certain of Wesley's doctrines and became aware that some Church of Scotland ministers refused to share the same pulpit as Wesleyans. She decided to dismiss Wesleyan preachers from her chapel.

== Death and legacy ==
Lady Glenorchy died on 17 July 1786 in George Square, Edinburgh and was buried in Lady Glenorchy's Church. The service was held by Rev Thomas Snell Jones DD.

She had no surviving children. To ensure that her favoured evangelical enterprises would flourish, she left much of her £30,000 estate to her chapels, to the SSPCK and to a fund for educating young ministers.

Her biography was written by Rev Thomas Snell Jones DD minister of the Lady Glenorchy Church.

On the demolition of Lady Glenorchy's Church in 1844, the remains of Lady Glenorchy were removed to the family vault in St John's burying ground, but in 1859 they were laid to rest in the Richmond Place Chapel where a suitable vault had been built and where the marble tablet removed from the original Church was placed over the grave. She was exhumed again when the chapel was deconsecrated in 1972.
