= Winston Theatre =

Theatre in Bristol, England

Coordinates: 51.4569°N 2.6084°W

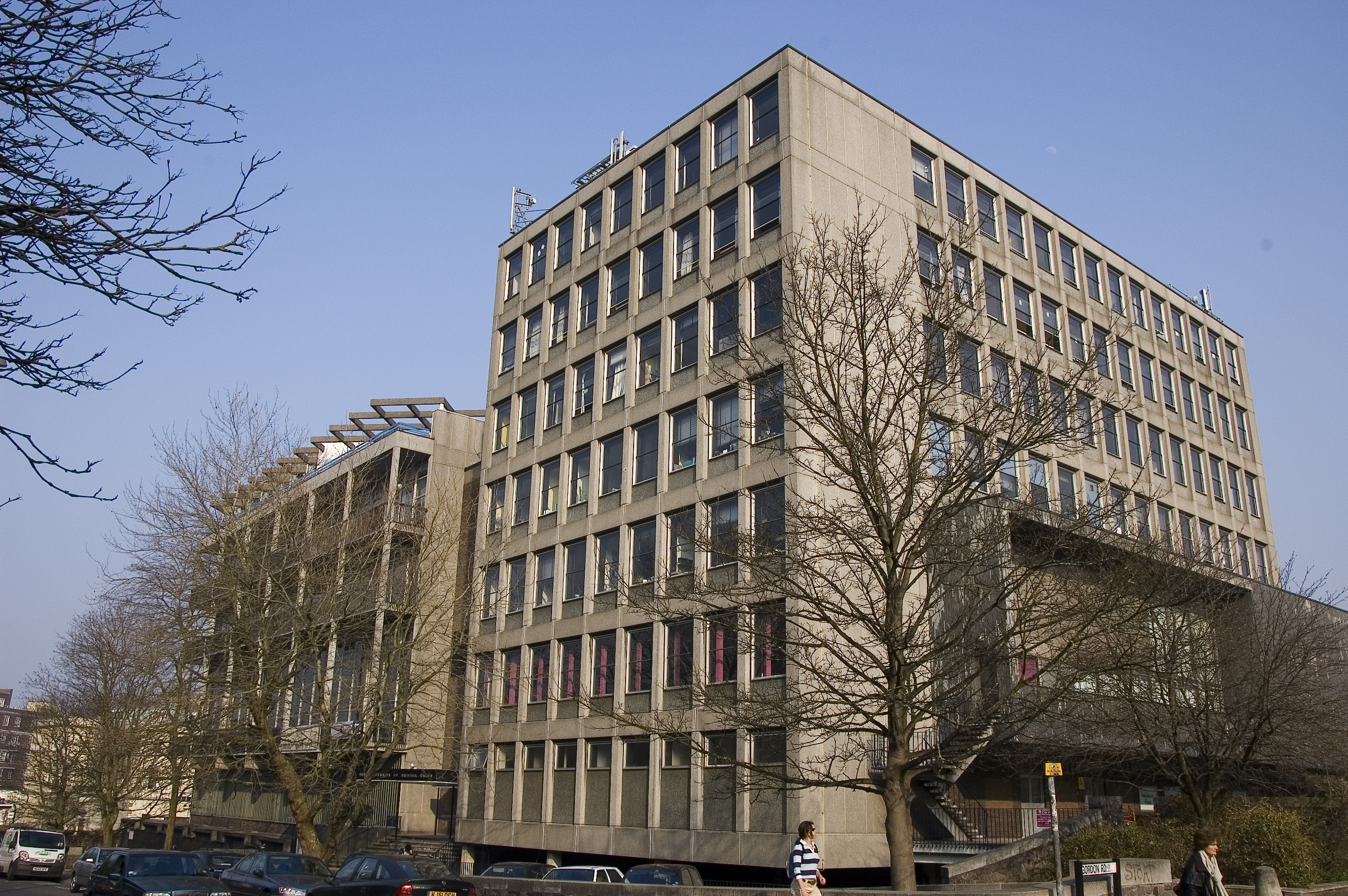
- Interactive map of Winston Theatre
- Address: 105 Queens Road; Clifton, Bristol; England
- Owner: University of Bristol Union for University of Bristol
- Capacity: 204+5 for FOH
- Type: Proscenium theatre
- Current use: Student Theatre, University Film Screenings

Construction
- Opened: 1965
- Renovated: 2015

Website
- www.bristolsta.com
- www.uobtheatre.com

The Winston Theatre is a traditional proscenium arch theatre located in the Bristol Students' Union building, one of the largest students' union buildings in Great Britain. The theatre seats 204, with 5 additional seats for the Front of House staff and 2 spaces for wheelchairs.

The Theatre has an orchestra pit, fly galleries with winchable lighting bars and hemp bars, a control room, an FOH sound location, two dressing rooms, and a sliding scenery dock door at the rear of the stage (currently disused).

In April 2013 the theatre was temporarily closed for refurbishment as part of the wider refurbishment of the students' union building, and re-opened in February 2015.

== History ==
The Winston Theatre was built in the 1960s as part of the Students' Union building on Queens Road in Clifton, Bristol. The Union moved to this new location in 1965 from the Victoria Rooms, as a larger premises due to the large expansion of the University and increase in undergraduate numbers.

== Refurbishment ==
Between 2013 and 2015, as part of the renovation work to the Union building, the Winston theatre was refurbished. The Stage Technicians' Association (a student society which operates the theatre on a day-to-day basis on behalf of Bristol SU) worked closely with the Union, Galliford Try and Stage Electrics to design a space which was suitable for their current needs, and would also remain up to date as technology moved on.

== Notable events and productions ==
- The UK National Student Film Festival, Screentest. Created as a platform to showcase student filmmaking talent from around the UK, the awards ceremony has been held in the Winston Theatre in Bristol since 2004. Guests at the festival have included:
  - BAFTA award winner Luis Cook
  - Director Ken Loach
  - Actress Emily Watson
  - Screenwriter David Nicholls
  - Chairman of BAFTA Duncan Kenworthy
  - UK Film Council Chairman Stewart Till
- The first UK amateur production of Footloose was performed by Music Theatre Bristol at the Winston Theatre in June 2009. The rights for the show have been released by Josef Weinberger.

== See also ==
- University of Bristol Union
- University of Bristol
- List of theatres in Bristol
