= Bierkeller Theatre =

Coordinates: 51.4559°N 2.5925°W

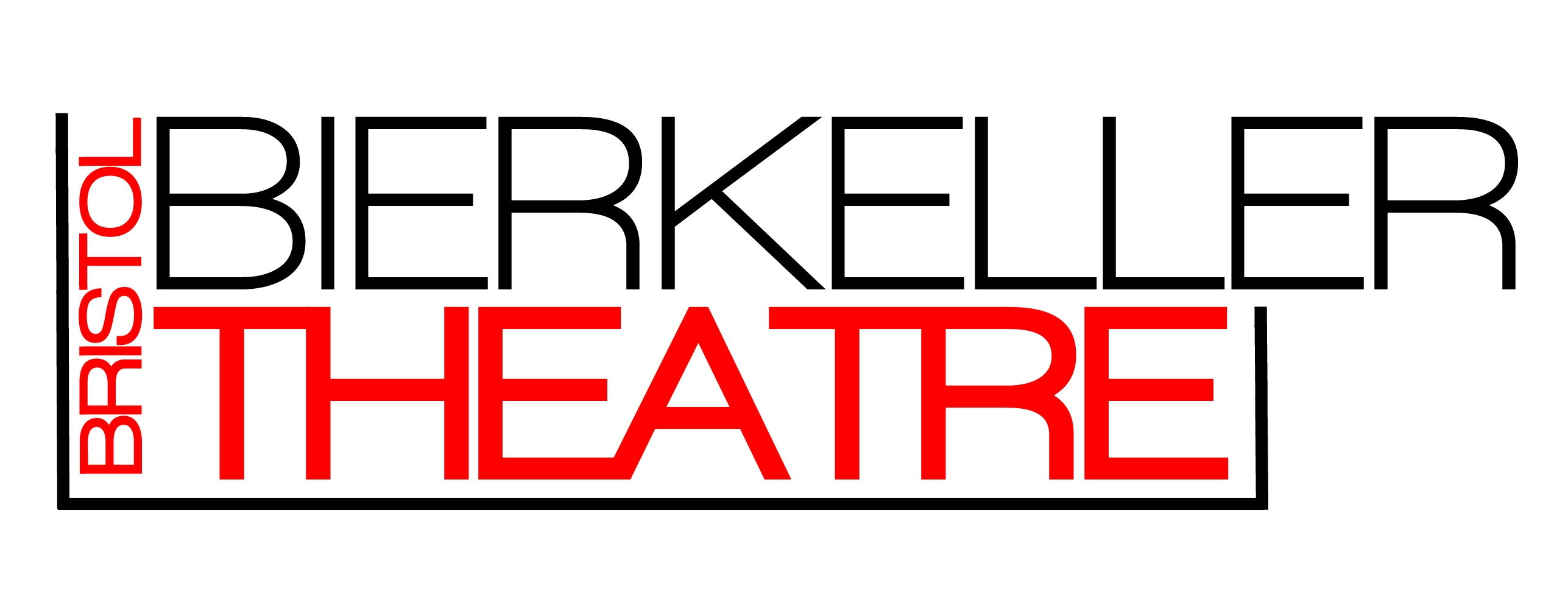
- Bierkeller Theatre's logo
- Interactive map of Bierkeller Theatre
- Address: All Saints Road, Bristol, BS1 2NA; England
- Owner: Chief Executive Austin Mockridge
- Capacity: 400
- Type: Commercial Theatre; Artistic Director Alex MacMillan

Construction
- Opened: 2011 (première production: January 2012)

Website
- bierkellertheatre.com

The Bierkeller Theatre was a theatre in Broadmead, Bristol, England, located inside Bristol's oldest night club, the Bristol Bierkeller.

Previously a host for the Bristol Shakespeare Festival, the Bierkeller Theatre officially opened in mid-January 2012, receiving local, national and international companies.

The theatre announced its inaugural season, with a production "Rescue Me!", from the local company of actors FarOutMan Theatre. Since the opening of the theatre over 150 productions have been staged. An intern scheme for technical staff has been developed with the University of the West of England and Filton College. The theatre also works with students from Bath Spa University.

The theatre reduced its output after the departure of artistic director, Alex MacMillan, in June 2014 and closed at the same time the Bristol Bierkeller shut down in January 2018.

== Notable Performances ==
Before developing a dedicated theatre space and opening as a theatre, The Bristol Bierkeller would host occasional theatre performances and one off productions, including the Bristol Shakespeare Festival in 2010. The theatre welcomed back the festival in 2012 following its official opening.

The Bierkeller Theatre was host to the first Bristol Improv Festival, later renamed Bristol Improv Theatre Festival (BITFest), across several days in March 2013. The festival featured a range of improv comedy talent from across the South West, including multiple improvisational theatre groups such as Degrees of Error, Closer Each Day, Racing Minds, Project2 and Instant Wit. The company behind the festival later founded the Bristol Improv Theatre, the UK's first dedicated improv theatre.

== See also ==
- Culture in Bristol
- List of theatres in Bristol
