= Wickham Theatre =

Theatre in Bristol, England

Coordinates: 51°27′19″N 2°36′03″W

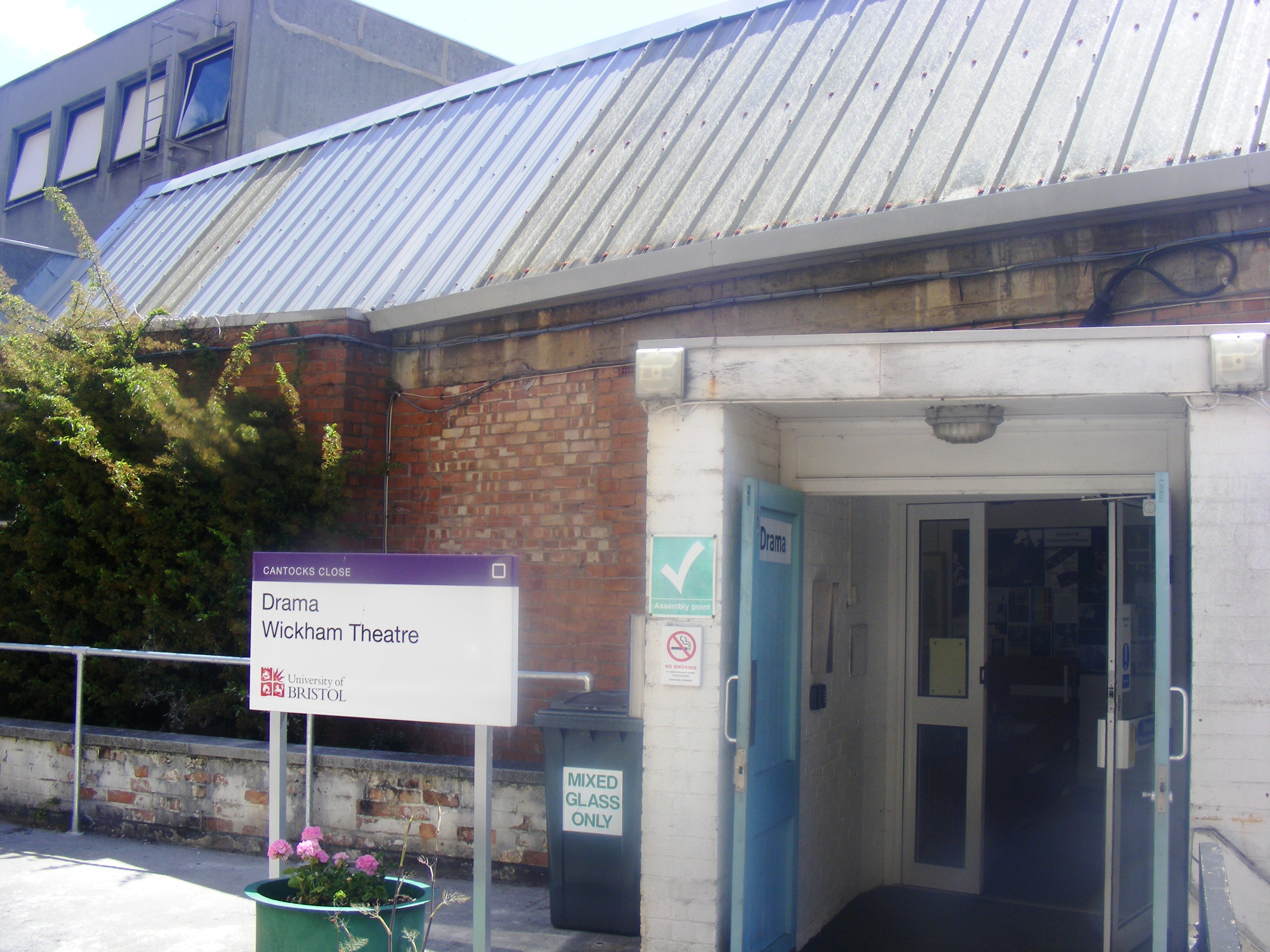
Wickam Theatre entrance

Wickham Theatre, Bristol

The Wickham Theatre is a studio theatre owned by Bristol University in Bristol, England.

== Naming and main uses ==
It has been home to the university's Department of Drama since 1968 and was named after Professor Glynne Wickham, founder of the department and of university theatre studies in Britain, upon his retirement, having been previously called the Vandyck Theatre. It is used for a wide range of activities.

The exploration of live performance is an important part of the department's approach the understanding of theatre. Students in all years engage in performances exploring forms and expressions in several theatrical traditions including experimental contemporary practice. The theatre is home to a regular programme of visiting performers and companies working at the forefront of live performance practice internationally.

== Example uses for research projects ==
The theatre is also used extensively for research projects in a range of forms and media. One example is its use for the reconstruction of a Jacobean playhouse. Developed by Professor Martin White and theatre designer Jennie Norman from original drawings by the celebrated Jacobean architect, Inigo Jones, a full-scale reconstruction of a 17th-century Jacobean indoor playhouse, lit by candles, provides a venue for an ongoing research project, public performances, a programme of teaching, and public lectures. The department aims, whenever possible, to combine teaching and research activities. Second and final year students studying early modern drama with Martin White have full access to the reconstruction, to deepen their seminar study of indoor plays from the period, and as a site for their own practical exploration.

A second example is its use for a ‘Preconstruction’ of human survival in Bristol following the worst ravages of global warming some time in the near future. Developed by Professor Baz Kershaw (University of Bristol Chair of Drama 1998–2006) with environmental movement artist Sandra Reeve as co-director, plus costume designer Pam Tate, set designer Jennie Norman, and lighting/technical designer Rod Terry, a 2004 production called Green Shade stripped the Wickham Theatre back to its bare walls – it was originally a printing workshop – to create an environmental installation modelled on Cornwall's celebrated Eden Project. Integrated with the department's teaching programme for both second and third year students, the nine-hour durational performances were part of a longer-term research project investigating theatre and performance ecology.

== See also ==
- List of theatres in Bristol
