= Bristol Diamonds =

Quartz crystals found in Bristol, England

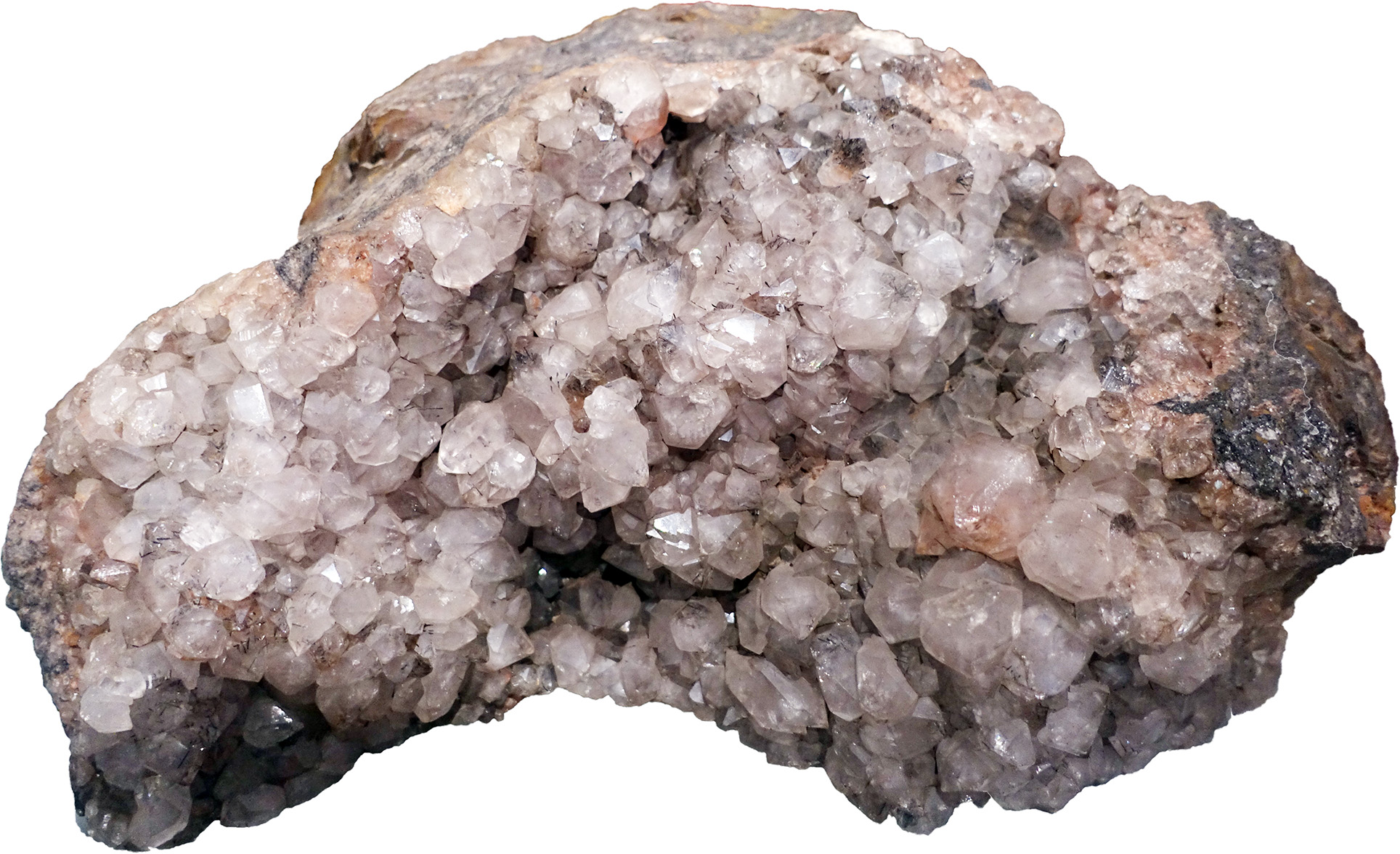
- An example of Bristol Diamonds

General
- Category: mineral
- Formula: Silica (silicon dioxide, SiO_{2})
- Crystal system: hexagonal

Identification
- Color: Colorless, white, purple, yellow, pink
- Crystal habit: 6-sided prism ending in 6-sided pyramid (typical), drusy, fine-grained to microcrystalline
- Mohs scale hardness: 7
- Luster: Vitreous
- Diaphaneity: Transparent to nearly opaque
- Specific gravity: 2.65
- Solubility: Insoluble at STP; 1 ppm_{mass} at 400 °C and 500 lb/in^{2} to 2600 ppm_{mass} at 500 °C and 1500 lb/in^{2}

Bristol Diamonds are quartz crystals found in geodes and geological rock formations which occur in dolomitic conglomerate in the Avon Gorge in Bristol, England. Their origin lies in geological processes of the Triassic period, about 250 to 200 million years ago.

The Bristol Diamonds became popular novelties for visitors to the spa at Hotwells, Bristol, during the eighteenth and nineteenth centuries. Diarists John Evelyn and travel writer Celia Fiennes were amongst those who described them. In popular culture they became a synonym for something bright but worthless.

== Origin ==
Dolomitic Conglomerate formed during the Triassic period (about 250 to 200 million years ago) in the Bristol Avon Gorge as a result of clays mingling with rock debris scree which had formed against the Carboniferous limestone cliffs of the gorge. The geodes containing the Bristol Diamonds are frequently found in this conglomerate, in the areas of Bridge Valley Road, Leigh Woods, Sea Mills and St Vincent's Rocks. The geodes were formed from quartz, either megaquartz or fibrous quartz, the diamonds themselves resulting from the dissolution of nodules of anhydrite leaving a void which allowed the silica crystals to grow.

== In popular culture ==
In William Camden's topographical survey of Great Britain and Ireland, published in 1586, the diamonds are described:

The one of them which on the East-side overlooketh the river beareth the name of S. Vincents rock, so full of Diamants that a man may fill whole strikes or bushels of them. These are not so much set by, because they be so plenteous. For in bright and transparent colour they match the Indian Diaments, if they passe them not; in hardnesse onely they are inferior to them, but in that nature herselfe hath framed them with six cornered or foure cornered smooth sides, I thinke them therefore worthy to be had in greater admiration. The other rocke also on the West-side is likewise full of Diamants, which by the wonderfull skill and worke of nature are enclosed as young ones within the bowels of hollow and reddish flints, for heere is the earth of a red colour.

In 1654, diarist John Evelyn visited Bristol and, like many other visitors, went hunting for the diamonds, "what was most stupendous to me was the rock of St. Vincent, the precipice whereof is equal to anything of that nature I have seen in the most confragous cataracts of the Alps. Here we went searching for Bristol diamonds and to the Hotwells at its foot." The late seventeenth century English traveller Celia Fiennes described them,

This is just by St Vincents Rocks yt are Great Clifts wch seeme as bounds to ye river Aven, this Channell was hewn out of those Rocks. They Digg ye Bristol Diamonds wch Look very Bright and sparkling and in their native Rudeness have a great Lustre and are pointed and Like ye Diamond Cutting; I had a piece just as it Came out of ye Rock wth ye Rock on ye back side and it appeared to me as a Cluster of Diamonds polish'd and jrregularly Cut.

The central hall of Goldney Grotto, an ornate feature of the 18th-century gardens at Goldney House, Clifton, contains columns covered with the crystals. The diamonds were often referred to "as examples of worthless but deceptive brilliance." Thomas Carlyle, in a letter dated 1828, used them in a simile disparaging the latest work of the poet Thomas Moore, as being "resplendent with gold-leaf and Bristol diamonds, and inwardly made of mere Potter's-clay."

Bristol Diamonds became popular souvenirs for visitors to the spa at Hotwells in the early nineteenth century, and were also used for jewellery, although Benjamin Silliman, a nineteenth-century American traveller, considered them overpriced. They were described by Chilcott, in Chilcott's new guide to Bristol, Clifton and the Hotwells (1826) as sometimes "exceedingly clear and brilliant, and of so hard a nature as to cut glass ... sometimes tinged with yellow, sometimes purple". Sample Bristol Diamonds were exhibited as part of the geology of Bristol section at London's The Great Exhibition, in 1851.

Bristol Diamonds was the title of a popular one act farce by nineteenth century dramatist John Oxenford, premièred at St James's Theatre, London in 1862 and described by the Daily News as a "capital farce, with a good plot, and most humorous dialogue." Nineteenth-century romantic novelist Emma Marshall published Bristol diamonds: or, The Hot wells in the year 1773, the plot of which centred on a brooch made of Bristol Diamonds.

Eighteenth and nineteenth century collection and quarrying in the Avon Gorge have exhausted the once ready supply of Bristol Diamonds, although some are still occasionally discovered. Examples can be seen at the University of Bristol's Geology Museum and at Bristol City Museum.

== See also ==
- Lithophysa
- Septarian nodule
