= Burst Radio =

Student radio station at the University of Bristol

Coordinates: 51°27′24″N 2°36′47″W

Programming
- Format: Music & Speech

Ownership
- Owner: University of Bristol Students' Union

Links
- Website: www.burstradio.org

Bristol University's Radio Station (Burst) is a radio station run by students of the University of Bristol, UK. Its studios are located within the University of Bristol Students' Union building and it broadcasts online. The station was initially known as 'BURST FM', but this name was dropped as the station no longer broadcasts on FM frequencies. The station is off air during university vacations.

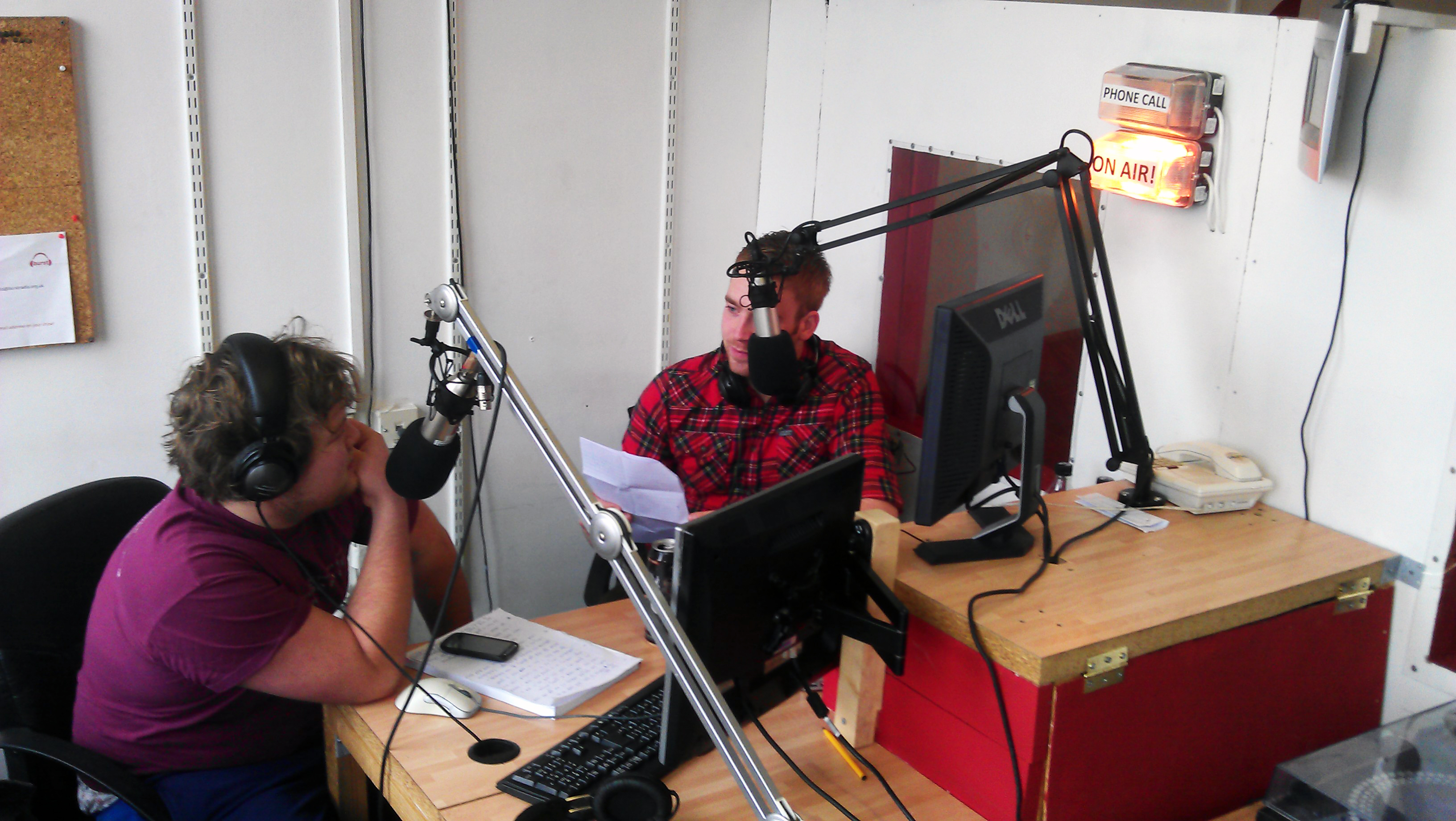
Burst Radio presenters in the studio, March 2012

== History ==
In 1995, students from Bristol University and the University of the West of England (UWE) co-operated to run Fresh FM. When Fresh FM closed, Burst FM was started by Bristol University students in 1997, awarded a one-month licence to broadcast on 106.6 FM awarded for March 1998.

However, the unavailability of further FM licences, due to the launch of a new full-time station The Eagle (now renamed Star), prevented further broadcasts. In early 2000 speakers were installed in the Bristol Union (now the University of Bristol Student Union) building, and broadcasts mounted during 'Fresh' (Bristol University's Freshers' Week) 2000. A grant from Bristol University's Alumni Foundation and fundraising through advertising and sponsorship allowed Burst to build new studios inside the Union, and to stream programming online.

An application was made for a further FM licence in Autumn 2000, giving Burst the rights to 106.6 FM with a Restricted Service Licence. An application was made for another one-month licence in Summer 2001. This licence was also awarded, as well as a subsequent licence in November 2001, promoted by club nights and coverage in student and local press. In 2003, Burst began broadcasting via the internet on a permanent basis.

In 2005, talks began to start using an AM signal. Broadcasting on 1134 AM commenced in October 2007 via a transmitter in Stoke Bishop. The start of AM broadcasting coincided with new management and re-branding of the station. Burst went from an orange/blue logo to a new orange/red/white colour scheme. This was replaced by a 'headphones' style logo and, in 2010/2011, the colours of Burst were changed again to red and white.

In September 2007, the station updated its systems in preparation for the AM launch. Under the flag of 'Project Excalibur', the on-air studio was refurbished and new equipment installed. This culminated in a live broadcast with BBC Radio 6 Music. In December 2007, Burst's production studio was also updated, bringing it in line with the changes in the on-air studio.

In 2008, Burst launched the first ever student radio soap, 'The Arches', in collaboration with Epigram, the student newspaper. A new Union show was also launched. This was, however, cut short after a multiple computer breakdown in 2008.

Burst recommenced broadcasting in 2010, airing every day during term time. In 2019, specialist programming was combined with dedicated 'Breakfast' and 'Hangover Brunch' slots on weekdays, and 10am-12pm 'Brunch' shows at weekends. It fazed out overnight music at the end of 2019, with an hour's early music on 14 December. On 1 November 2021, off-schedule broadcasting returned during term times, with the station now joining BCfm overnight.

On 25 February 2018, Burst hosted the Student Radio Association's 'Student Chart Show'.

In September 2019, Oscar Edmondson and Rhiannon Du Cann took over as Station Manager and Operations Manager, implementing a podcast recording schedule to run in parallel with live shows.

The station went off air when the University of Bristol closed to manage the COVID-19 pandemic, but on 9 April 2020 it broadcast 'The Bristol University Singalong' for one hour over pop-up station Burst Radio Quarantine. It then offered a slimmed-down schedule the following term, returning to usual scheduling in September 2021 alongside a visual relaunch spearheaded by Station Manager George Ruskin, Operations Manager Fergal Maguire and Head of Commercial Octavia Hutchings.

== Current Position ==
From 2019, news bulletins broadcast hourly from an external newsroom. Travel, sport and weather reports also recur during 'Breakfast', 'Brunch' and 'Hangover Brunch' programmes. Burst's shows are all in-house, though some podcast series are independent student productions. The station does not carry advertising but may accept sponsorship deals.

The station's facilities consist of an on-air studio, from which most live programmes are presented, and a production studio, used for recording and editing. Additionally, music sessions may be recorded in the 'Burst Music Room', located on another floor of the Student Union building.

As of 2023, the Burst leadership team consists of Flora Guildford (station manager), Katie Wood (head of operations) and Lorenzo Horne (head of commercial).

== Alumni ==
Notable former broadcasters include the comedians Marcus Brigstocke and Danny Robins, magician Chris Cox, presenter Paris Troy and footballer Theofanis Gekas.
