= Radcliff Hall =

Radcliff Hall may refer to:

== People ==
- Radclyffe Hall (1880–1943), an English poet and author

== Buildings ==
- A fictional school in The Girls of Radcliff Hall, a lesbian roman-a-clef by Lord Berners

== See also ==
- Redcliffe Hall (disambiguation)
