= John Hippisley (actor) =

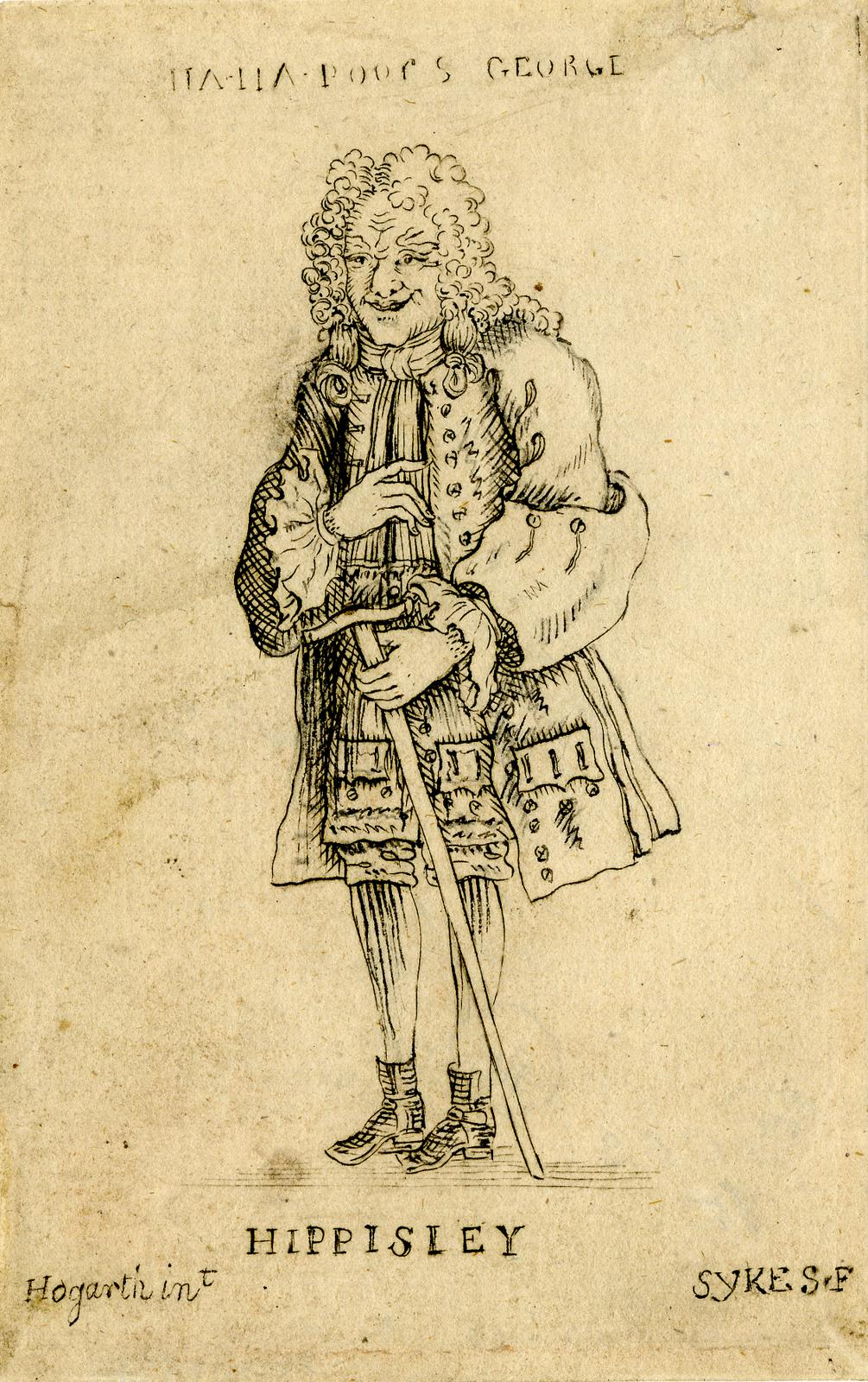
Hippisley as Sir Francis Gripe in The Busie Body

John Hippisley (14 January 1696 – 12 February 1748) was an English comic actor and playwright. He appeared at Lincoln's Inn Fields and Covent Garden in London, and was the original Peachum in The Beggar's Opera. He opened a theatre in Bristol, the Jacobs Well Theatre, where he and his daughter Elizabeth Hippisley appeared.

== Life ==
Hippisley was born near Wookey Hole in Somerset. Hippisley's first recorded appearance took place at Lincoln's Inn Fields in November 1722, as Fondlewife in William Congreve's The Old Bachelor; he is announced in the bills as never having appeared on that stage before. This was followed in the same season by Sir Hugh Evans in Shakespeare's The Merry Wives of Windsor, Gomez in John Dryden's The Spanish Friar, Polonius in Hamlet, Pandarus in Troilus and Cressida, and other comic parts.

He remained at Lincoln's Inn Fields until the season of 1732–3, playing among many other characters Sir Francis Gripe in Susanna Centlivre's The Busie Body, Sir William Wisewood in Colley Cibber's Love's Last Shift, Corbaccio in Ben Jonson's Volpone, Old Woman in John Fletcher's Rule a Wife and Have a Wife, Obadiah in Robert Howard's The Committee, and Calianax in Francis Beaumont and John Fletcher's The Maid's Tragedy, and originating one or two characters, the most important of which was Peachum in John Gay's The Beggar's Opera in January 1728.

=== As playwright and theatre owner ===
In August 1728 he performed in Bristol his play The English Thief, or The Welsh Lawyer; later that year he leased land in Bristol and built a small theatre, Jacobs Well Theatre, which opened on 23 June 1729 with Congreve's Love for Love. The building was so small that actors who left from one set of wings had to walk around the building if their entrance was from the opposing side of the stage. At one point he had to borrow a large sum to keep it going. He took a company to the theatre during the summer from 1741 to 1747; his daughter Elizabeth appeared there. it was his plan in 1747 to open a larger theatre in Bath but he died before this could be done.

At Lincoln's Inn Field in 1731 he performed for his benefit his play The Journey to Bristol, or the Honest Welshman, probably first seen in Bristol; it was published that year. (The piece, with some alterations, and under the title of The Connaught Wife, was given in 1767 at the Smock Alley Theatre, Dublin, and printed in London in the same year.)

Hippisley also took part, probably in 1730, in an unrecorded representation of his own ballad opera Flora (1730), an adaptation from The Country Wake of Thomas Doggett. Hippisley played Sir Thomas Testy in March 1732 in his Sequel to Flora, or Hob's Wedding (1732), another adaptation from The Country Wake, attributed to John Leigh. Flora goes down in recorded history as the first opera of any kind to be produced in North America (on 18 February 1735 in Charleston, South Carolina).

=== Covent Garden ===
In 1732–3 Lincoln's Inn Fields and Covent Garden were under the same management, and in December 1732, on the opening night of the new Covent Garden Theatre, Hippisley played Sir Wilful Witwoud in Congreve's The Way of the World. In January 1733 he was Lord Plausible in William Wycherley's The Plain Dealer. Hippisley remained at Covent Garden for the rest of his life. His numerous new parts included Shallow in Henry IV, Part 2, Ananias in Ben Jonson's The Alchemist, Clown in The Winter's Tale and Gardiner in Henry VIII. In January 1747 he was the original Sir Simon Loveit in David Garrick's Miss in Her Teens. After this time his name disappears from the bills.

== His style ==
Thomas Davies, in his Life of Garrick (i. 356), described Hippisley as a "comedian of lively humour and droll pleasantry". His appearance was comic, and always elicited laughter and applause from the audience. This was in part due to a burn on his face, received in youth. He says of himself, in his epilogue to The Journey to Bristol, that his "ugly face is a farce".

== Family ==
His son John Hippisley appeared at Covent Garden as Tom Thumb, in April 1740; he later was known as a writer about Africa. His daughters Jane (1719–1791) and Elizabeth (fl. 1742–1769) became actresses.

== Death ==
He died at Bristol on 12 February 1748. He was buried in Clifton, Gloucestershire, with the following epitaph:

When the Stage heard that death had struck her John,

Gay Comedy her Sables first put on;

Laughter lamented that her Fav’rite died,

And Mirth herself, (’tis strange) laid down and cry’d.

Wit droop’d his head, e’en Humour seem’d to mourn,

And solemnly sat pensive o’er his urn.
