= Improvathon =

The word Improvathon is a portmanteau of the words improvisation and marathon and is used to describe an extended performance by a team of improvising performers. The format establishes a group of characters early on, who become part of a continuous plotline. Commonly, as well as scenes which progress the story, performers may participate in musical numbers and other challenges or games. The action is directed for both performers and audience by writers who develop the plot in response. Whilst some performers may take a break at some point during the event, traditionally some core cast members will participate for the entire duration, going one or two nights without sleep. The sleep deprivation reduces performers to their "lizard brain" state, where they become too tired to censor themselves, resulting in a unique and euphoric form of theatre. Many audience members stay for the full duration, sharing the sleeplessness with the actors. In Edmonton, Canada, where the concept was originally devised, it is known as a Soap-A-Thon.

== Soap-A-Thon ==
The Soap-a-thon has most notably been made popular by Canadian improv company Die-Nasty who completed their first 50-hour Soap-A-Thon in 1993 at the Varscona Theatre. They have produced further Soap-A-Thons every year since.

== Improvathons, UK ==
=== London ===
==== 2005 ====
In 2005, Die-Nasty's director at the time Dana Anderson exported the format to the UK, working with British director and theatrical innovator Ken Campbell. The 36-hour Improvathon began at 10 am, 17 December 2005 at Ladbroke Grove's Inn on the Green. Following this experiment, Sticking Place (now renamed Extempore Theatre) Artistic Director Adam Meggido developed the event into the London Annual 50 Hour Improvathon, involving performers from all over the world.

==== 2008 ====
Name: Casino Oui Oui

Producer: The Sticking Place

Duration: 50 hours

Dates: Friday 17 January – Sunday 19 January

Set: A casino in Monaco in the mid-1960s

Venue: At The People Show Studios, Pollard Row, Bethnal Green

==== 2009 ====
Name: Pack Up Your Troubles

Producer: The Sticking Place

Duration: 50 hours

Dates: Friday 6 February – Sunday 8 February

Set: 1944, a Kent village

Venue: At The People Show Studios, Pollard Row, Bethnal Green

==== 2010 ====
Name: We Are Not Amused

Producer: The Sticking Place

Duration: 50 hours

Dates: Friday 22 January – Sunday 24 January

Set: Victorian era, England

Venue: Hoxton Hall

==== 2011 ====
Name: Studio 50

Duration: 50 hours

Dates: Friday 21 January – Sunday 23 January

Set: Studio 50 (a New York night club), 1977

Venue: Hoxton Hall

==== 2012 ====
Name: Tales from the Greek Games

Duration: 50 hours

Dates: Friday 11 May – Sunday 13 May

Set: Ancient Greece, the first Olympic Games

Venue: Hoxton Hall

==== 2013 ====
Name: Cairo 1926

Duration: 50 hours

Dates: Friday 11 – Sunday 13 January

Set: Cairo 1926

Venue: Hoxton Hall

==== 2014 ====
Name: Xanadu

Duration: 50 hours

Dates: Friday 24 – Sunday 26 January

Set: The Starship Xanadu, a pleasure cruiser travelling from planet to planet

Venue: Park Theatre

==== 2015 ====
Name: Tinseltown

Duration: 50 hours

Dates: Friday 29 – Sunday 31 May

Set: Sleepless Studios, A B-movie production house in Hollywood's Golden Age

Venue: The Lost Theatre, Stockwell

==== 2016 ====
Name: The Orient Express

Duration: 50 hours

Dates: Friday 29 April – Sunday 1 May

Set: Sleepless Studios, A B-movie production house in Hollywood's Golden Age

Venue: The Lost Theatre, Stockwell

==== 2017 ====
Name: Lord of Thrones

Duration: 50 hours

Dates: Friday 20 – Sunday 22 January

Set: All the literary fantasy worlds combined - Tolkien, George R R Martin, etc.

Venue: Wilton's Music Hall

=== Liverpool ===
==== 2008 ====
The first Liverpool Improvathon took place in 2008 as part of Ken Campbell Metafex Festival at the Kazimier, Wolstenholme Square. Oh Wait! lasted 30 hours and was directed by Dana Anderson of Die-Nasty. The action took place on the RMS Pedantic as it made its way from Liverpool to New York. Some of the participants of this event went on to form Liverpool-based, improvisation comedy troupe Impropriety

==== 2010 ====
Name: The Last Resort

Producer: Impropriety

Duration: 33.5 hours

Dates: Saturday 10 April – Sunday 11 April

Set: 1950s, a holiday camp somewhere in the north of England

Venue: The Kazimier

==== 2011 ====
Name: Dearly Beloved

Producer: Impropriety

Duration: 33.5 hours

Dates: Saturday 14 May - Sunday 15 May

Set: The Fools Rush Inn, at a wedding, which brought together and posh family and a rather less high-class family. It took place two weeks after the wedding of Prince William to Catherine Middleton.

Venue: The Kazimier

==== 2012 ====
Name: Back to The Studio

Producer: Impropriety

Duration: 33.5 hours

Set: Behind the scenes at Channel 33.5

Venue:

=== Bristol ===
==== 2010 ====
In 2010, The Sticking Place, in association with Die-Nasty, presented the 30-hour Bristol Jam Improvathon. The events ran from 6pm on Friday 5th until Saturday 6 November at midnight, with performers from Impropriety also taking part. The action took place at the Easyspeak Speakeasy in 1920s America.

==== 2015 ====
In 2015 the Bristol Improv Theatre re-launched the Bristol Improvathon with the Closer Each Day Company and support from various other improv groups from around the South-West. It was titled "Time Busters" and was set in the town of Glastonbury where a team of archeologists were searching for the body of King Arthur. The event was advertised as a 26-hour, 385 second improvathon and ran from 6pm on Friday 13 March to 10pm Saturday 14 March.

==== 2016 ====
The newly named Bristol Improv Marathon was hosted for the second year running at the Bristol Improv Theatre, once again in association with Closer Each Day Company and various improv groups from around the South-West. The title was "Ride on Time" and the plot was centred around the re-opening of the fictional theme park "Fantastic Planet of Fun".

==== 2017 ====
The 2017 Bristol Improv Marathon was hosted for its third year, March 24–25 and was the first marathon hosted by the Bristol Improv Theatre following the refurbishment and relaunch of their main venue. Once again the event was produced by the Bristol Improv Theatre in association with Closer Each Day Company and various improv groups from around the South-West. The title was "Check-Out Time at the Grand Hotel" and the plot was centred around the closing of a fictional remote hotel.

==== 2018 ====
The 2018 Bristol Improv Marathon took place on March 17–18 and was titled "Pirates of the Severn Seas". Once again it was staged at the Bristol Improv Theatre and produced in conjunction with Closer Each Day and other local improv companies. The story focused on pirates, citizens of 'Port Royal', and various plotters who sought to destroy their way of life.

==== 2019 ====
In 2019 the Bristol Improv Marathon took place on March 15–16 and was titled "Channel 26 (hours)". It continued to be hosted at the Bristol Improv Theatre whilst being produced by Closer Each Day, with the rest of the cast of 30 being sourced from the local improv community, either via invitation or open auditions. The story focused on the lives of the people working at local news station Channel 26, and their various misadventures.

==== 2020 ====
In 2020 the Bristol Improv Marathon took place on March 13–14 and was titled "When In Rome: XXVI Hours BC". It was hosted at the Bristol Improv Theatre in collaboration with Closer Each Day Company and The Wardrobe Theatre. The other performers were from Degrees of Error (the Bristol Improv Theatre's resident company) or the local improv community via auditions. It focused on the events of a selection of characters in a generic ancient imperial Rome setting. It was the last show with a live audience at the Bristol Improv Theatre before it shut its doors due to the Coronavirus pandemic.

== YT Improvathons ==
The performance format discussed above is not to be confused with the annual event held by the Christian Youth Theatre in the United States. Each year, teams of young people come together to compete in playing improvisational games over two-days.
