= Bristol Improv Theatre =

Improv theatre in Bristol, UK

- BIT
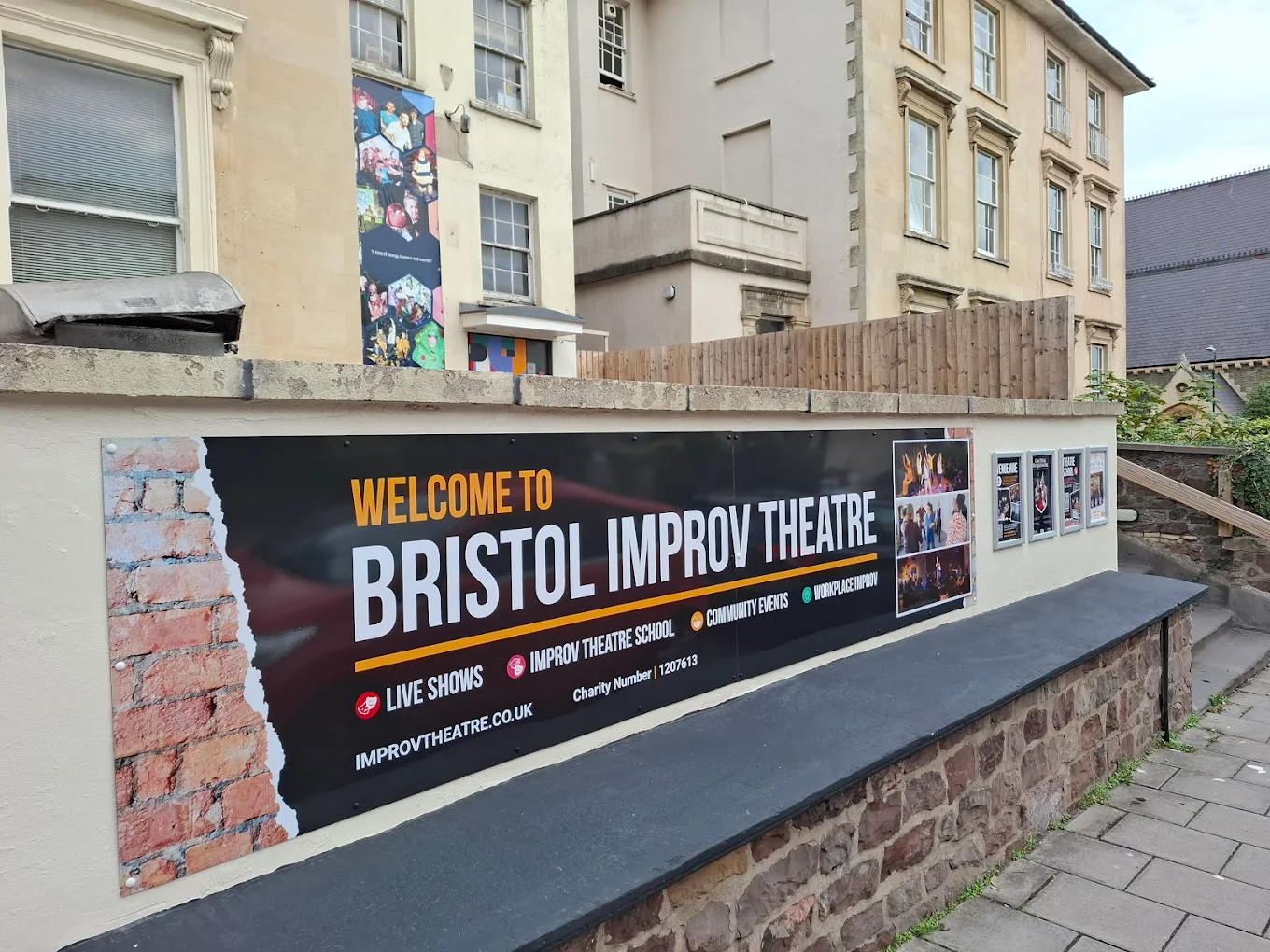
- Bristol Improv Theatre in October 2025
- Interactive map of Bristol Improv Theatre
- Former names: The Polish Ex-Servicemen's Club
- Address: 50 St Paul's Road; BS8 1LP; Bristol; United Kingdom
- Coordinates: 51.4586°N 2.6116°W
- Capacity: 120 (Theatre); 80 (Bar - Seated)
- Type: Theatre, Improv Theatre, Performing Arts, Venue
- Designation: Grade II listed building

Construction
- Built: c.1850
- Reopened: 3 March 2017

Website
- Bristol Improv Theatre

Bristol Improv Theatre (BIT) was an improvisational theatre company and event venue in Bristol, England. It operates as a charity in the former site of The Polish Ex-Servicemen's Club on St Paul's Road in Clifton.

== History ==
The theatre is a Grade II listed building situated on St Paul's Road, in the Whiteladies Road area of Clifton, Bristol, a few yards from the historic Bristol Lido.

The company was established in 2012, operating as a theatre company and course provider across multiple Bristol arts venues, such as Bristol Old Vic and Bierkeller Theatre until 2013 where it found a regular home at The Polish Ex-Servicemen's Club. The Bristol Improv Theatre Festival (BITFest) was held at the Bierkeller Theatre, a 400-capacity theatre within Bristol's oldest nightclub, but was moved to The Polish Ex-Servicemen's Club once the company had made it a dedicated venue.

In 2016, the Bristol Improv Theatre announced it will be taking over the building from its existing owners and will reopen as a dedicated improv theatre venue after renovations. On 3rd March 2017, the Bristol Improv Theatre reopened its doors as the first permanent dedicated improv theatre in the South West.

From 2015 to 2020, the theatre hosted The Bristol Improv Marathon, an annual 26-hour improvathon, in collaboration with Closer Each Day Company. Each marathon involved carrying a continuous plotline with multiple improv performers from across the South West and United Kingdom. The 2015 Marathon, "Time Busters", had a cast of over 30 performers from multiple improv theatre groups, including Closer Each Day, Bristol Improv Society, Watch This Space, Bath Improv and more from across the South West. In March 2020, The Wardrobe Theatre joined the collaboration with the theme "When In Rome: XXVI Hours BC". It was the final show at The Bristol Improv Theatre with a live audience before the theatre closed during the COVID-19 pandemic.

In March 2024, the Bristol Improv Theatre became a registered charity. The organisation stated that the reason for this was to safeguard the future of the theatre, secure a sustainable business model and expanding their community effort across Bristol.

The theatre ceased operation on 9th October 2026 as a result of financial difficulties.

== Artistic directors ==
Artistic Directors
| Name | Period | Notable Productions |
|---|---|---|
| Andy Yeoh | 2012-2014 | The Bristol Improv Theatre Festival |
| Caitlin Campbell | 2014-2022 | Murder, She Didn't Write; Completely Wonderful; 머더미스터리 'Murder Mystery'; How The BIT Stole Christmas |
| Kierann Shah | 2022- | The Little Improv Festival |

== Unscripted Players ==
Unscripted Players (UP!) is the Bristol Improv Theatre's amateur drama improv theatre company and talent development programme. The initiative aims to create opportunities for non-professional improvisers to create, develop and perform improvised shows. UP! has been credited as the UK's first am-dram company dedicated to improvised theatre.

Each season, pitches are selected from the community to be developed into full improv shows. The Bristol Improv Theatre provides rehearsal space, guidance and support to bring the concept to life; and when ready, a cast, stage, and an audience. Developed shows are performed at The Bristol Improv Theatre, with many returning to the venue again at a later date. Since the programme's inception, several UP! shows have gone on to perform elsewhere across the UK.

Due to the frequency of original shows being produced, UP! shows commonly make appearances at Improv variety nights across Bristol and the South West, such as The Improv Spotlight at PRSC and Wednesday Night Improv at The Hen and Chicken.

Post-apocalyptic adventure comedy show, Tales from the Wasteland, directed by Peter Leaman, was developed as part of the Unscripted Players spring cohort in 2023 and has since been performed at several venues across the South West as well as Camden Fringe Festival.

Notable Shows from Unscripted Players
| Show | Year | Cohort | UP! Producer | Director | Initial Cast |
|---|---|---|---|---|---|
| Headtalks | 2024 | Summer | Kieran Shah | Katherine Olive | Andy Knox, Bonj, Emily Moore, Lucy Black, Paul Dwyer, Shell Trigwell |
| I Don't Know What You'll Do This Summer | 2024 | Summer | Kieran Shah | Charlie Hutchence | Billy Morton, Davy Evans, Emma Green, Jordan Seymour, Marcus Hadley, Sam Addy, Taru Muhonen |
| Tales From The Wasteland | 2023 | Spring | | Peter Leaman | |
| The Other Canterbury Tales | 2024 | Autumn | | Jack Greenwood | |
| Lawful Disorder | 2024 | Autumn | | Heidi Gautrey | |

== Improv Theatre School ==
The Bristol Improv Theatre offers a variety of courses and training programmes as part of its Improv Theatre School. The instructor team also offer workplace training and team-building as part of its Applied Improv offering. From January to October in 2025, the theatre had over 1300 students across its various courses.

Notable contributors to the theatre school's curriculum include Imogen Palmer and Stephen Brown. Palmer trained with the world-leading Impro Melbourne and the Howard Fine Acting Studio. Brown is a professional coach, trainer and business psychologist, he has co-created and produced one of the BIT's longest running shows, Tales of Adventure. Together, Palmer and Brown developed the BIT's Applied Improv offering.

British Comedian and improv performer, Pippa Evans, referenced the BIT's theatre school in her book, Improv Your Life.

== See also ==
- Culture in Bristol
- List of theatres in Bristol
