= Jacobs Well Theatre =

Former theatre in Bristol, England

- Location within Bristol
- Address: Bristol; England
- Coordinates: 51.453°N 2.610°W

Construction
- Opened: 1729
- Closed: c. 1800
- Demolished: c. 1800
- Years active: 1729–1799

Tenant
- John Hippisley

The Jacobs Well Theatre was a playhouse in Cliftonwood, Bristol, England, which opened in 1729. It took its name from the nearby Jacobs's Well, which may have been a mikveh, a type of Jewish ritual bath. The theatre was built by actor John Hippisley, who had created the character of Peachum in the premiere of John Gay's Beggar's Opera. The stage space was so small that actors exiting on one side had to walk around the building to re-enter on the other side, often being subject to banter by spectators enjoying this free show. A hole was knocked through a party wall to an adjacent ale house, The Malt Shovel, so that actors, and audience seated on the stage, could obtain refreshments. Admission prices ranged from 1 shilling to 3 shillings, and it was estimated that a full house could earn as much as £80. Servants of patrons were admitted free of charge to an upper gallery. In later years, Thomas Chatterton described the theatre as a "hut".

The journey to the theatre from fashionable areas such as Queen Square and College Green was somewhat perilous, especially on dark nights, and consequently the theatre often provided linkboys to light the way with torches. Notable actors who appeared at the theatre included Charles Macklin, William Powell, and Thomas King, who were all stars of the Georgian stage. After Hippisley's death in 1748, the business was continued by his widow. When the Theatre Royal opened in King Street in 1776 most actors left the Jacobs Well Theatre as the new venue proved to be more fashionable. The last recorded performance at Jacobs Well was a pantomime in 1779.

== See also ==
- List of theatres in Bristol

== Works cited ==
- Howell, Mark (1994). "The Regulated Theatre at Jacob's Well, Bristol" chapter one in Scenes from Provincial Stages: Essays in Honour of Kathleen Barker Society for Theatre Research London. Society for Theatre Research.
- Latimer, John (1893). The Annals of Bristol in the Eighteenth Century. Bristol.
- Powell, G. Rennie (1919). The Bristol Stage: Its Story. Bristol: Bristol Printing & Publishing Co.
- Watts, Guy Tracey (1915). Theatrical Bristol. Bristol: Holloway and Son.
