= Hope Chapel, Bristol =

Church in Bristol, England

Coordinates: 51.45130°N 2.62160°W

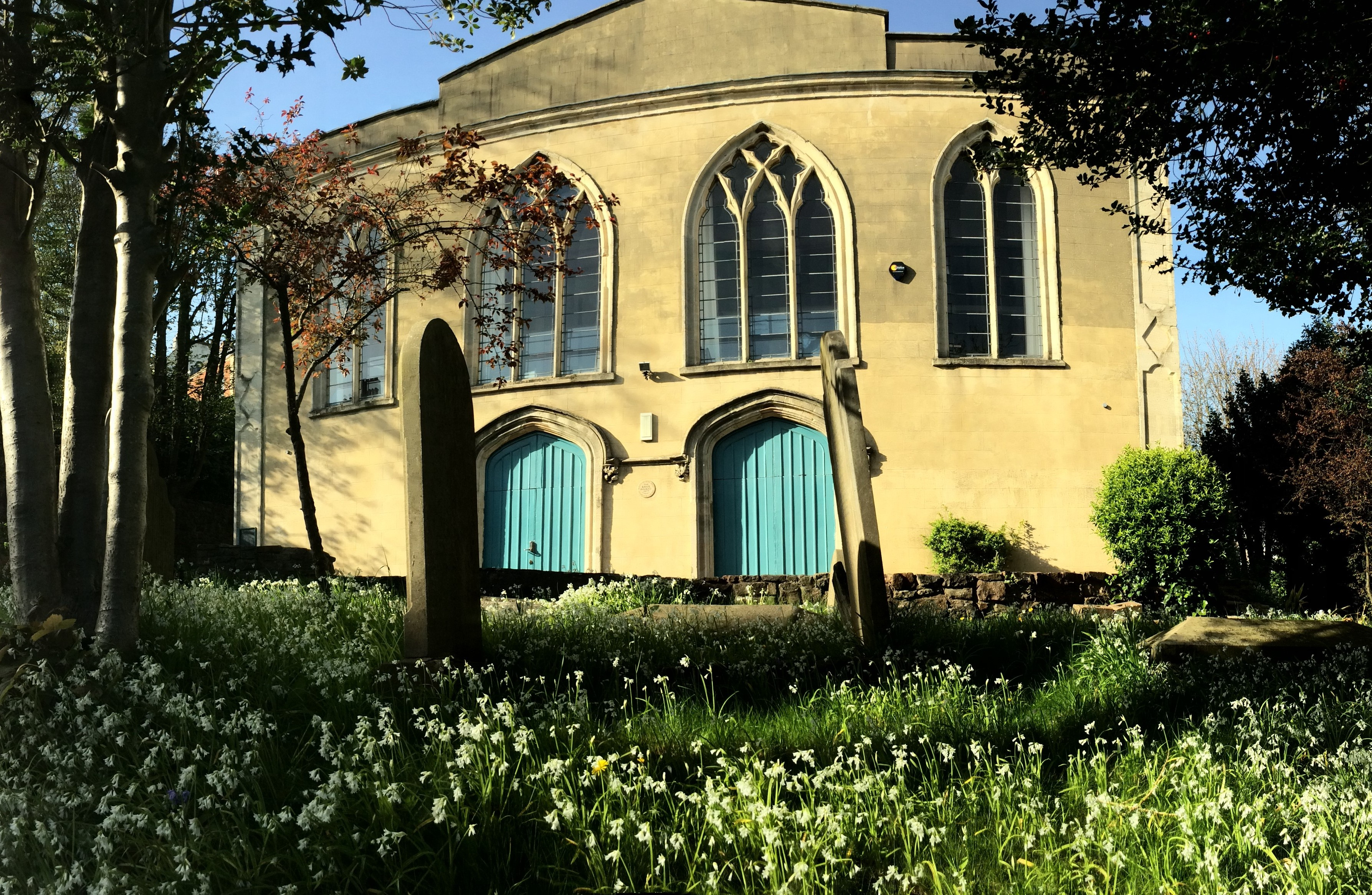
Hope Chapel, Bristol

Hope Chapel is home to Hope Community Church in Hotwells, Bristol, England. It is a Grade II listed building.

== History ==
The chapel was founded by Lady Henrietta Hope and Lady Glenorchy after visiting the Georgian natural hot spa resort in 1784. Lady Hope gave £2,500 towards the cost and Lady Glenorchy agreed to have it done. Lady Hope was ill and her friend decided to name it in her honour. However they both died in 1786 so it was Glenorchy's executor that completed their wishes. It is said that they decided to build it after finding that the only place of worship was up a steep hill in Clifton. By 1851 the church had an attendance of 600 to 700 in the morning and 700 to 800 in the evening.

By the 1970s attendance was falling and by 1980 it was no longer used as a place of worship. It then became a community centre named the 'Hope Centre', before reopening in 2000 as Hope Community Church, a Congregational Church.

Between 2006 and 2013 Bristol and Regional Archaeological Services (BaRAS) maintained a watching brief overseeing works to excavate the crypt ready for conversion into public space.

== Description ==
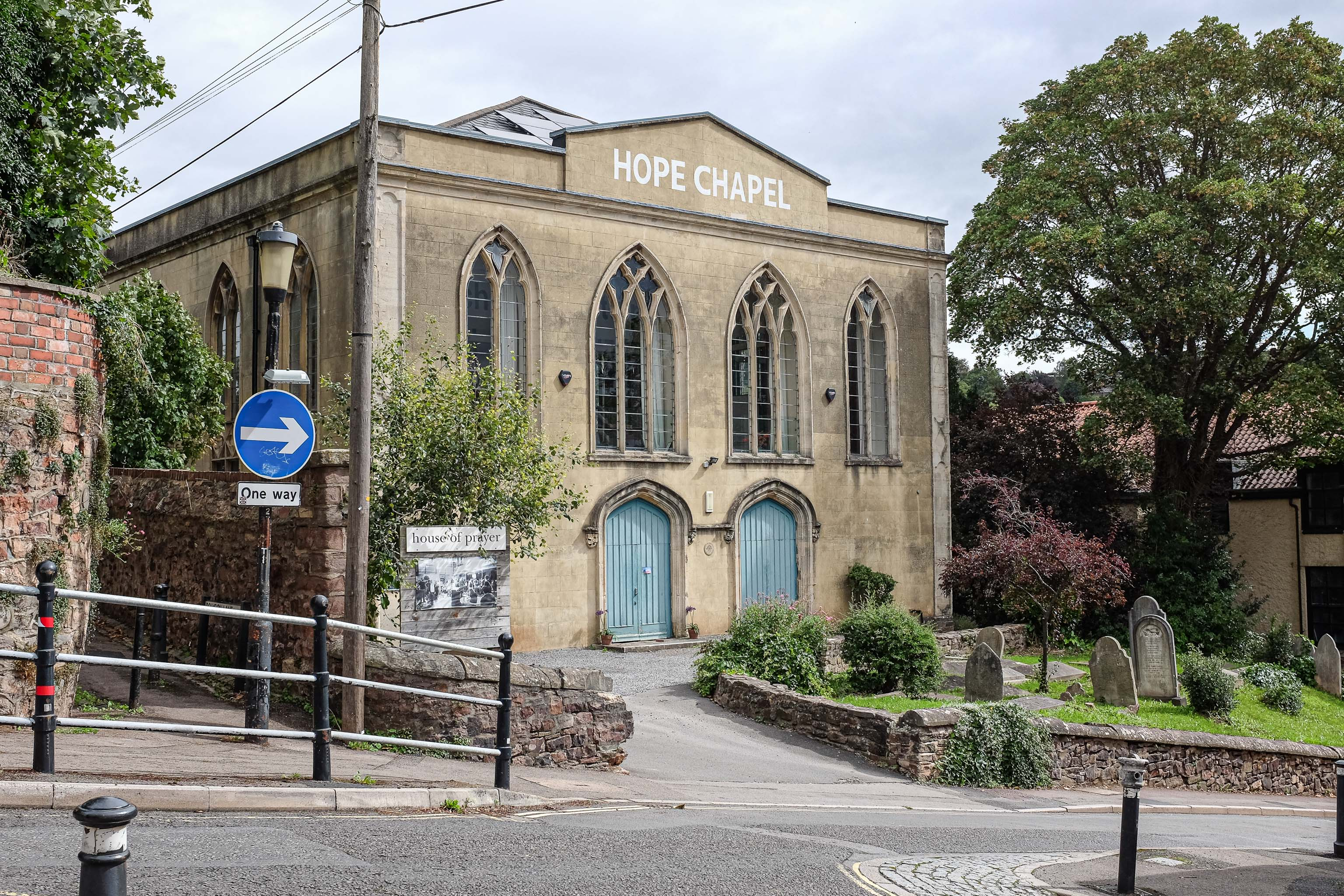
Hope Chapel, August 2023

The south front has four bays with pilasters. Within the hall there is a balcony supported on cast iron columns. The interior includes memorials to many members of the congregation from the late 18th and early 19th centuries.

== Archives ==
Records of Hope Chapel, Hotwells are held at Bristol Archives (Ref. 38545) (online catalogue) including baptism, marriage and burial registers.
