= Hotwells =

Area of Bristol, England

Coordinates: 51.45°N 2.62°W

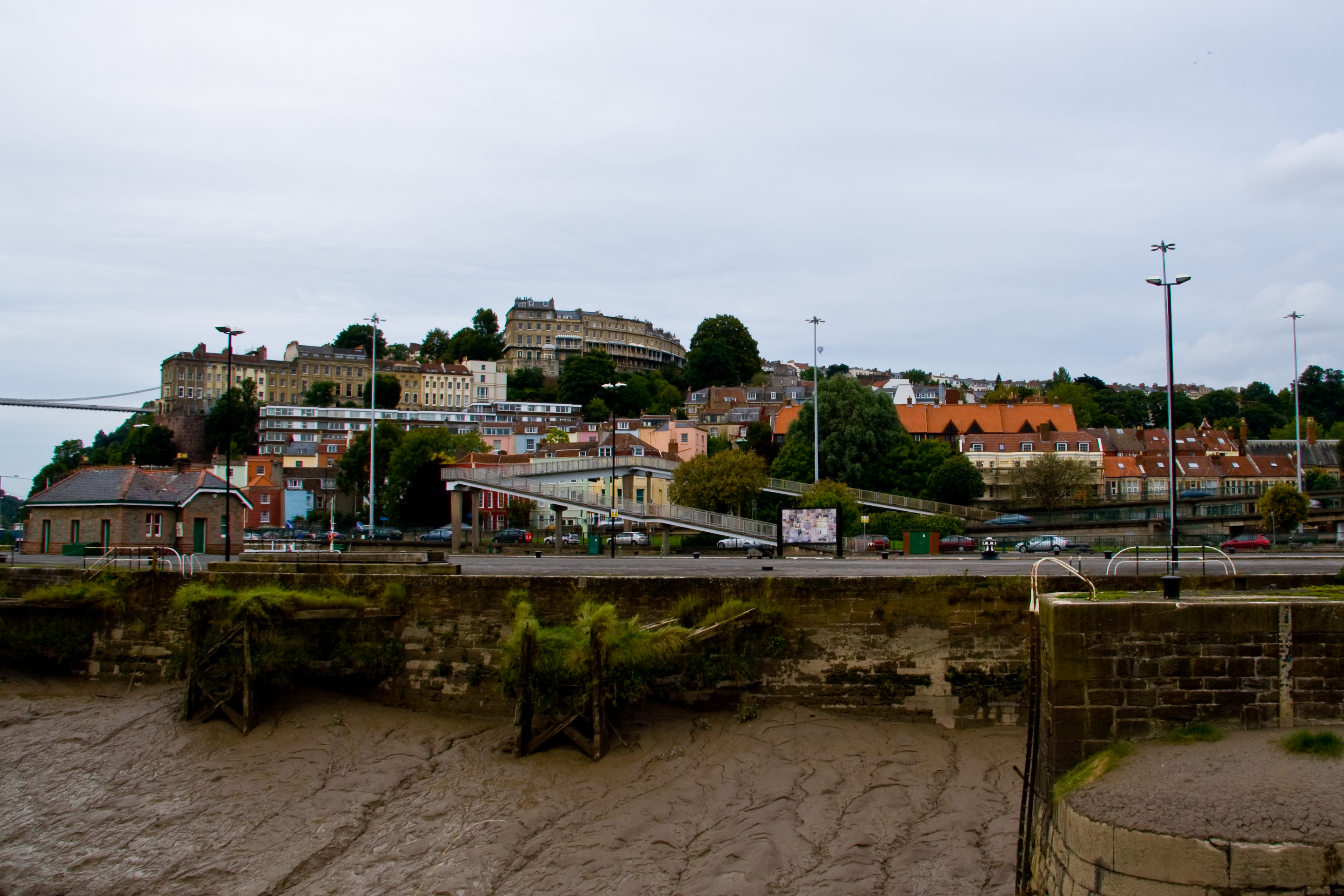
- The western part of Hotwells, with the bank of the River Avon and the A4 Hotwell Road in the foreground and the higher houses of Clifton Village above. The Clifton Suspension Bridge is just visible on the left.

- Location within Bristol
- Area: 0.155 sq mi (0.40 km^{2})
- Population: 3,002
  - Density: 19,368/sq mi (7,478/km^{2})
- OS grid reference: ST572727
- Unitary authority: Bristol
- Ceremonial county: Bristol
- Region: South West
- Country: England
- Sovereign state: United Kingdom
- Post town: BRISTOL
- Postcode district: BS8
- Dialling code: 0117
- Police: Avon and Somerset
- Fire: Avon
- Ambulance: South Western
- UK Parliament: Bristol Central

Hotwells is a neighbourhood in the English port city of Bristol. It is located to the south of and below the high ground of Clifton, and directly to the north of the Floating Harbour. The southern entrance to the Avon Gorge, which connects the docks to the sea, lies at the western end of Hotwells. The eastern end of the area is at the roundabout where Jacobs Well Road meets Hotwell Road. Hotwells is split between the city wards of Clifton, and Hotwells and Harbourside.

== Location ==
Hotwells is approximately 1 mile (1.6 km) west of Bristol city centre lying just north of the Floating Harbour and the River Avon. To the north and some 300 feet (91 m) higher is the suburb of Clifton. Much of the built up area was originally salt marsh known as Rownham Mead. Nearly half of Rownham Mead was excavated in the early 19th century to construct the Cumberland Basin, part of the entrance lock system to the city docks. The west of the area marks the beginning of the Portway road which connects Bristol to Avonmouth, passing under the Clifton Suspension Bridge which lies about 0.25 miles (0.40 km) north of Hotwells.

== History ==
Hotwells takes its name from the hot springs which bubble up through the rocks of the Avon Gorge underneath the Clifton Suspension Bridge. The springs were documented in 1480 by William Worcester, the 15th century chronicler and antiquary. He described the waters as being milky and as warm as those at Bath. By c.1630 the water of Hotwells was becoming known for its medical properties, both in its original form and when used to brew beer. Thomas Fuller, who had been a student of Dr Samuel Ward in the late 1620s, reported that 'beer brewed thereof is wholesome against the spleen; and Dr. Samuel Ward, afflicted with that malady, and living in Sidney College, was prescribed the constant drinking thereof, though it was costly to bring it through the Severn and narrow seas to Lynn, and thence by the river to Cambridge.' In 1650 Dr Venner recommended Hotwells water for those 'who have hot livers, feeble brains, and red pimply faces' and after 1680 the water became well known as cure for diabetes.

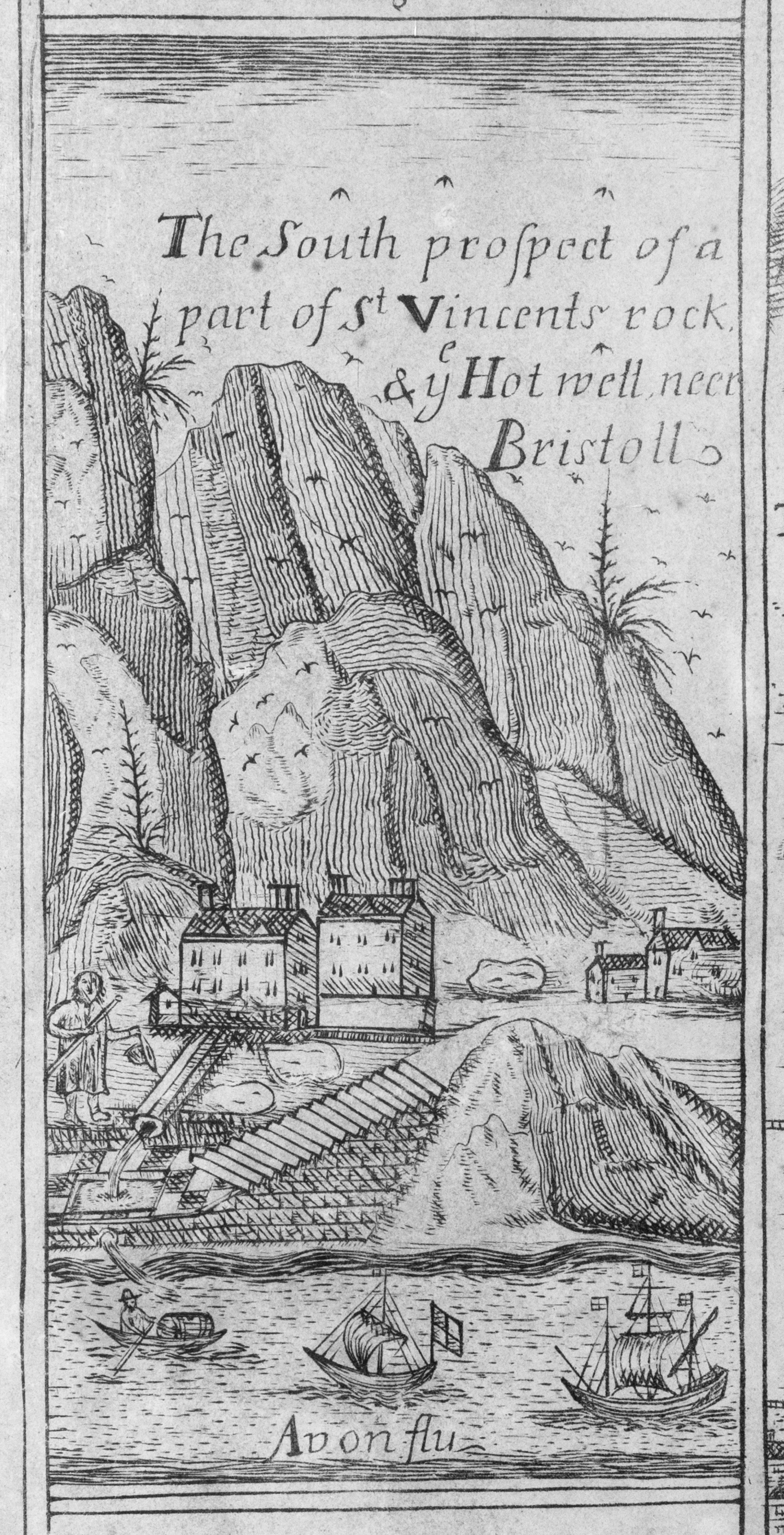
Depiction of the Hotwell in James Millerd's 1728 map of Bristol

The physician Alexander Sutherland, published a summary account of the qualities of Hotwells water in 1773, typically known by that time as "Bristol Water". Sutherland says of it that "BRISTOL-WATER received in a glass, appears, to the naked eye, colourless, pellucid, and manifestly impregnated with Air, sparkling and bounding through its substance, in the form of little bubbles, as if the whole had been in a ferment." He says the water tasted "particularly pleasant and soft" was "quite inodorous" and "lukewarm" only, rising from the pump at a constant 76 °F.

In 1692 the Society of Merchant Venturers leased the springs and a pump room was built. The pump room of 1696 was demolished and replaced by Hotwells House in 1816 which was itself demolished when the river was widened in 1867. In the Georgian era, Hotwells was developed as a spa including the building of Dowry Square in an attempt to compete with Bath. Many visitors came, including the diarist John Evelyn and the travel writer Celia Fiennes, who hunted for Bristol Diamonds in the gorge. The Somerset historian John Collinson came to Hotwells in 1793 seeking recovery from an unspecified lingering illness and died there on 27 August 1793.

During the 18th century Hotwells Water was extensively bottled and exported. Daniel Defoe noted in 1724 that there were over 15 glass-houses in Bristol, 'which are more than in London...and vast numbers of bottles are used for sending the water of the Hotwell not only over England but all over the world." Alexander Pope was another admirer, claiming in 1739 that 'I am satisfied that the water at the Well is different from what it is anywhere else.' Later customers of the water included Admiral Horatio Nelson, whose correspondence includes references to his purchase of Bristol water in 1798. Known for his abstemious habits, it was said 'He never exceeded four glasses of wine after dinner, and seldom drank three; and even those were diluted with either common or Bristol water.'

The Jacobs Well Theatre, built in 1729, provided entertainment for visitors and Bristolians, however Hotwells never attained the same status as Bath. In the 1790s 'the celebrated hot mineral spring, denominated the Bristol Hotwell' still featured in tourist guides. However, the spa went into decline during the Napoleonic Wars and by 1816 a local physician said of Hotwells that 'It has the silence of the grave, to which it seems the inlet. Not a carriage to be seen once an hour, and scarcely more frequently does a solitary invalid approach the neglected spring.'

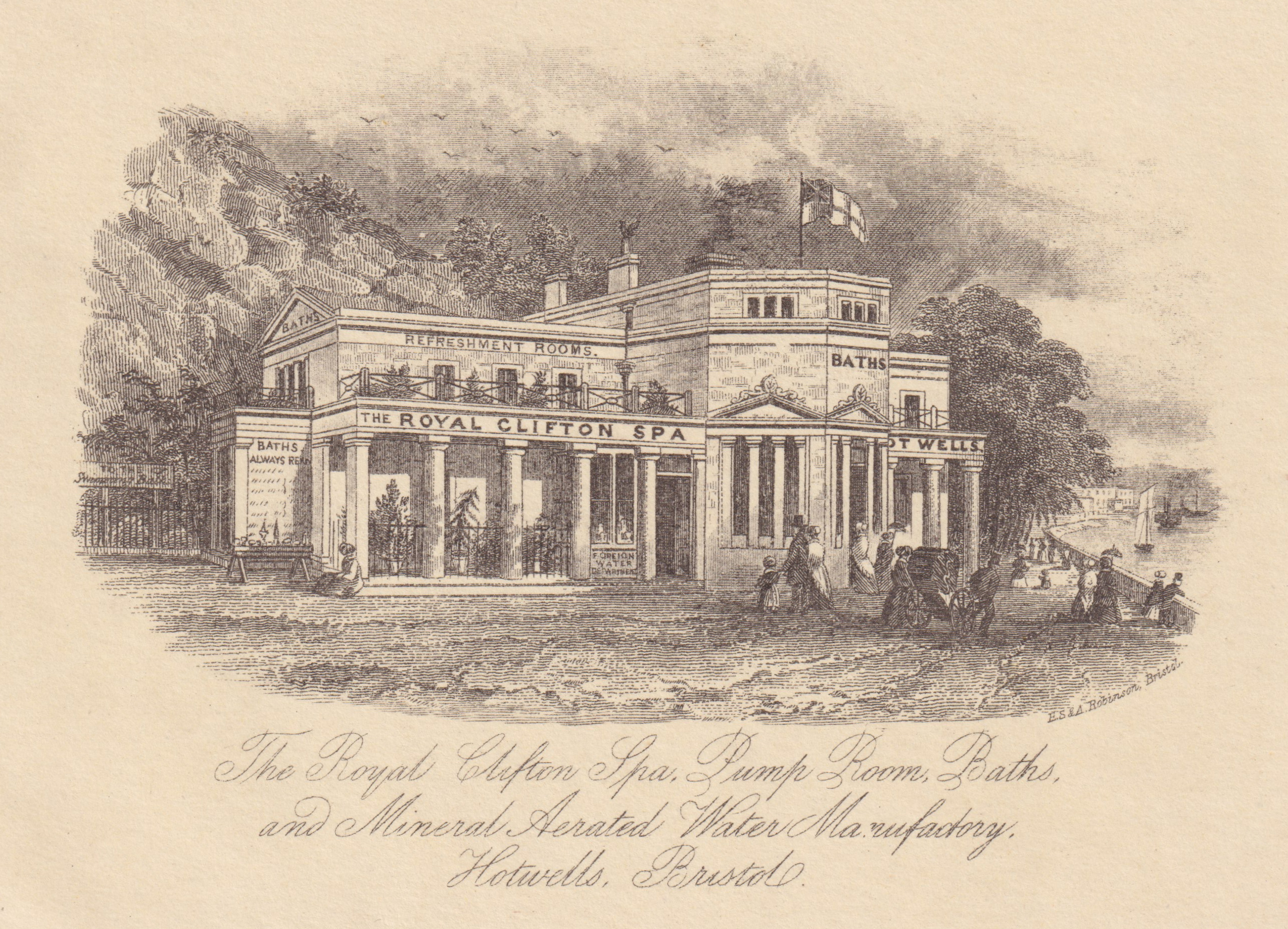
Royal Clifton Spa, 1852

A new pump room was built in 1822 and in the mid-19th century efforts were made to promote the spa, styled as The Royal Clifton Spa. The promotional efforts included the publication of a new guide, with sections written by eminent local scientists, William Herapath and Robert Etheridge, who discussed the water's chemistry and medicinal qualities, as well as the area's geology and botany.

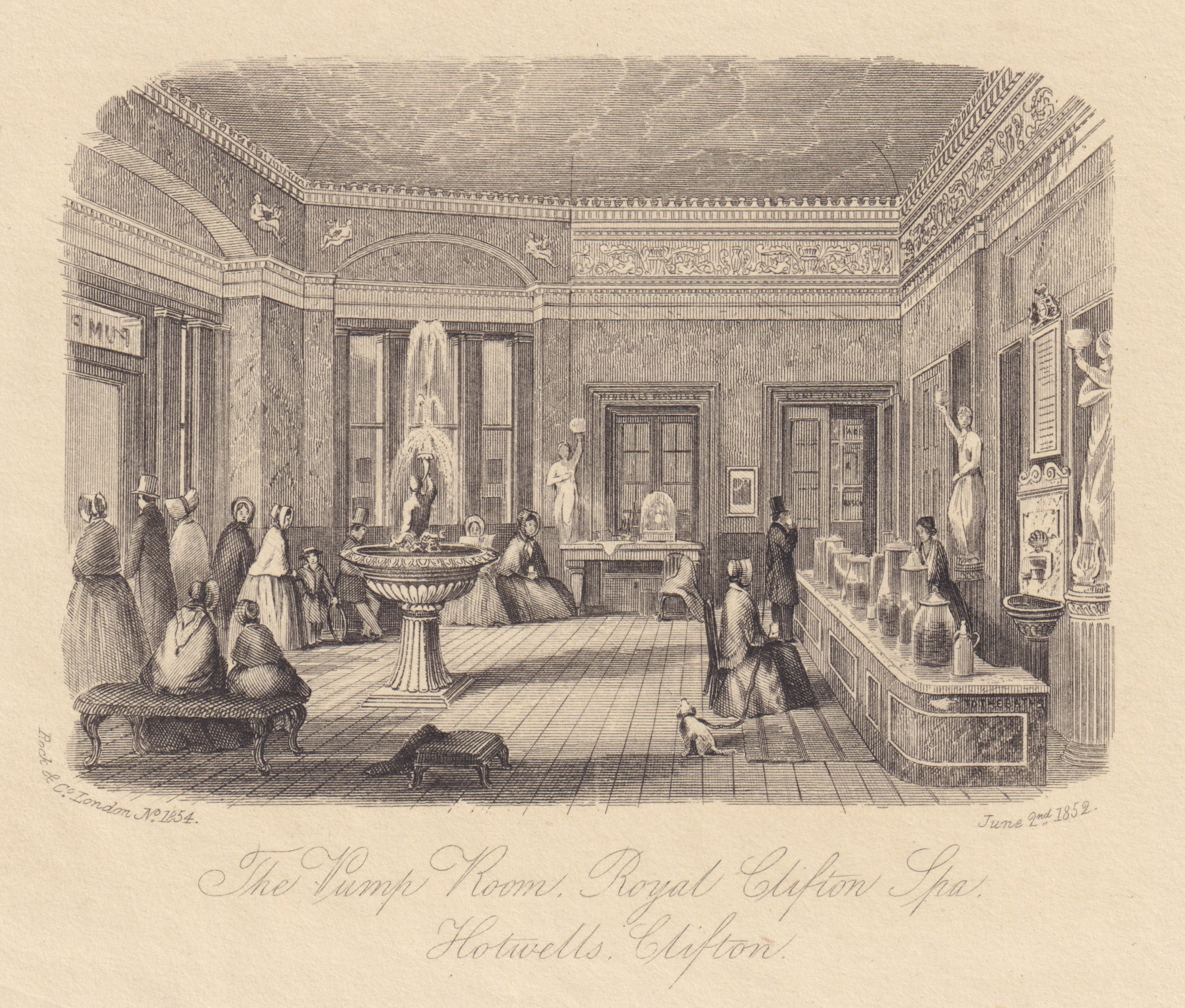
Pump Room of the Royal Clifton Spa, 2 June 1852

The new pump room was demolished in 1867 to allow for widening of the River Avon. A new pump was set up in 1877 and continued in use till 1913. However, the pump appears not to have tapped into the original spring. When it became clear that the pump's waters were polluted, the pipe was sealed off. There were trial borings in 1913 and 1925 to relocate the original spring, but these were unsuccessful.

In 1799, the physician Thomas Beddoes opened the Pneumatic Institution in Dowry Square. Free treatment was advertised for those suffering from consumption, asthma, dropsy, "obstinate Venereal Complaints" and scrophula. The laboratory superintendent was Humphry Davy, who investigated nitrous oxide, also known as laughing gas, using equipment designed by James Watt. Under Davy's supervision laughing gas parties were held, attended by guests such as Robert Southey, Thomas Wedgwood and Samuel Taylor Coleridge.

In the 20th century much of the housing in Hotwells was in a poor state of repair, but since the 1970s there has been refurbishment of the older Georgian properties and new housing built on derelict dockside wharves and along the Hotwell Road.

== Architecture ==
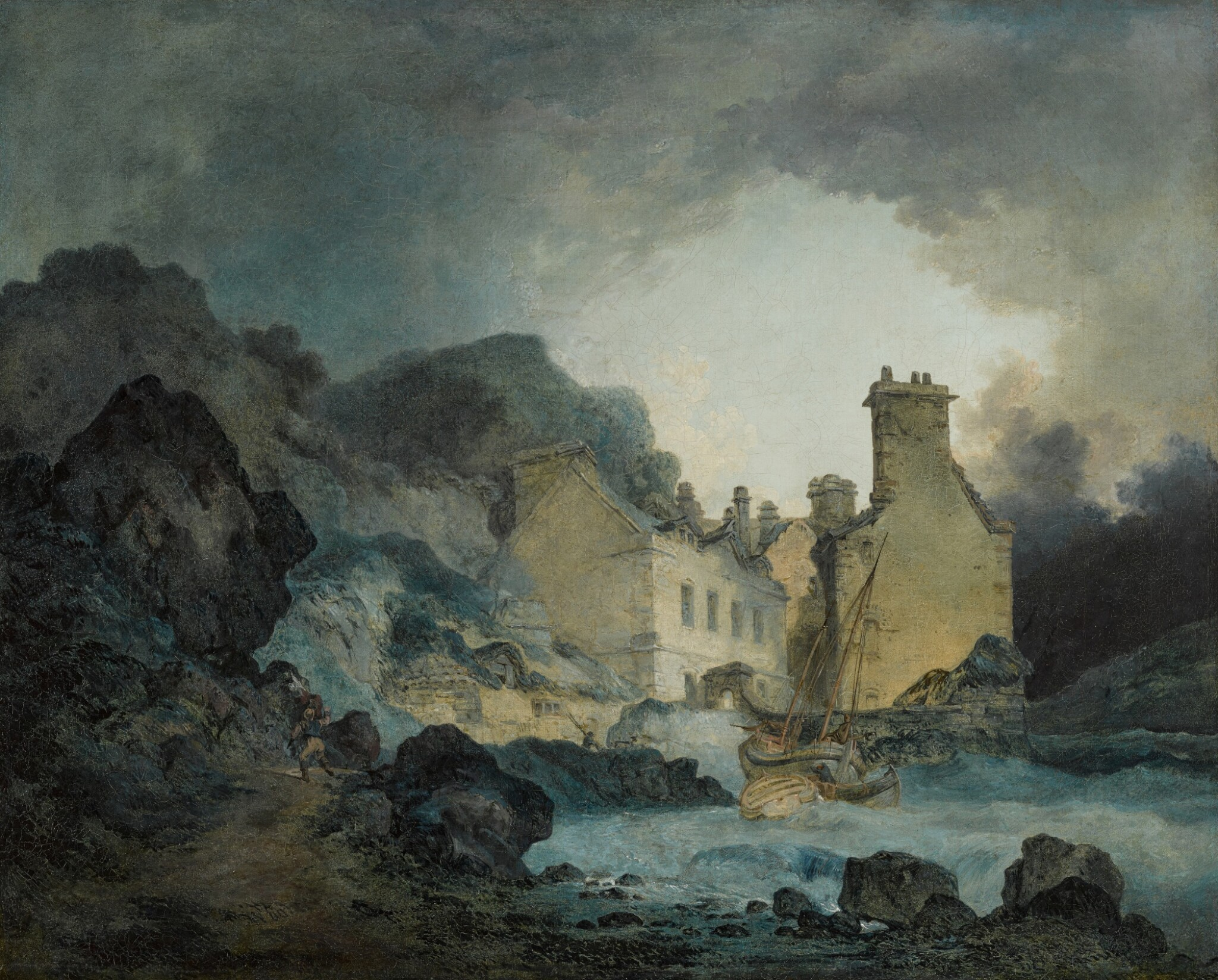
The Rising Squall, Hot Wells by J.M.W. Turner, 1793

Grenville Chapel, a Methodist church, was opened in 1839 in an Early English Style building. For many years it was used as a garage and is now housing association managed flats.

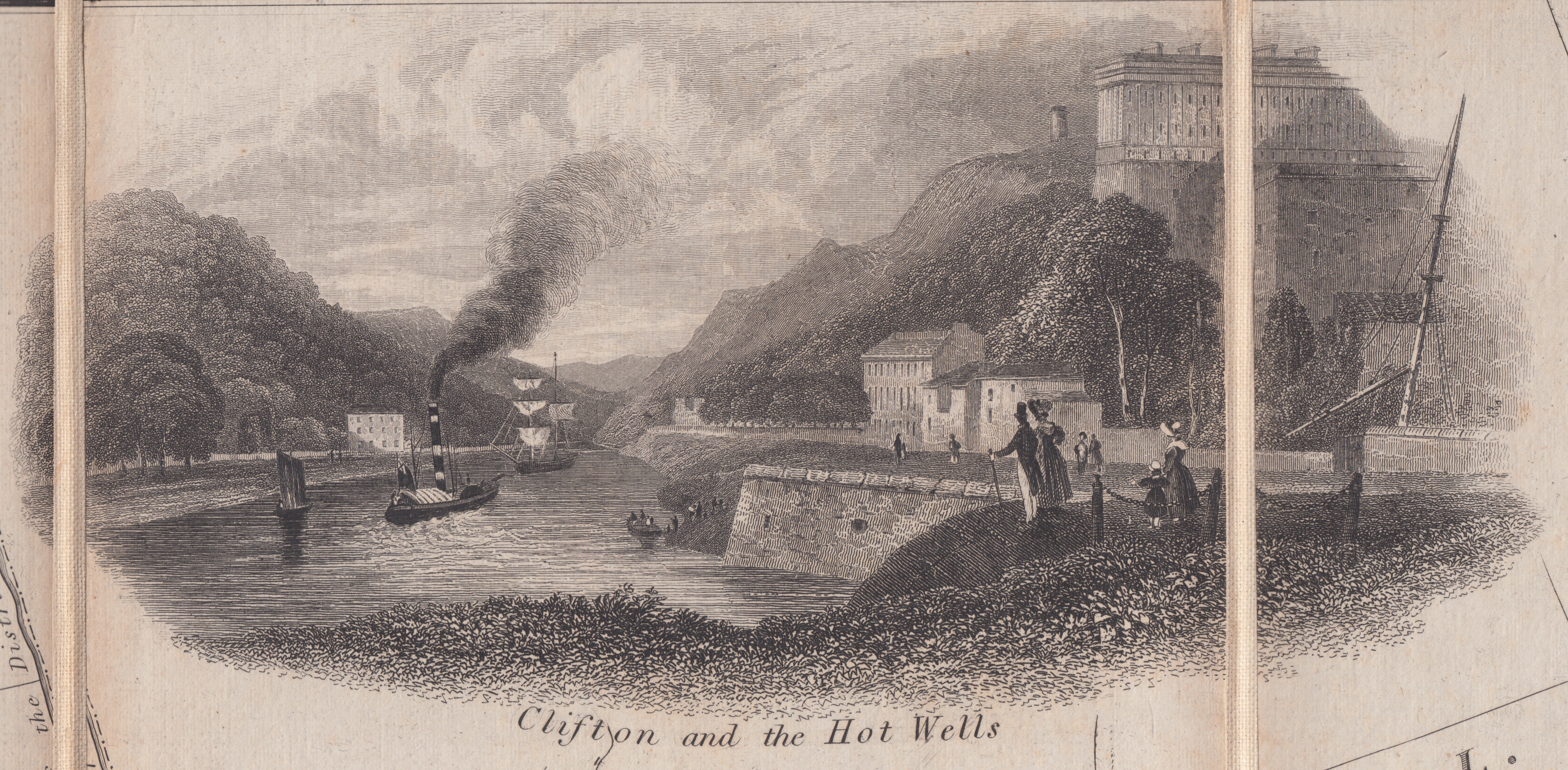
Clifton and Hotwells, looking down the River Avon, 1833

Hotwells has several of Bristol's Grade II* listed buildings, including the Church of Holy Trinity, designed by Cockrell, and Albemarle Row, a Georgian terrace. Also listed is the Pump House, formerly the power plant for Bristol Harbour's bridges and other machinery, now a public house.

== Cultural references ==
Hotwells features in two 18th-century novels. The Expedition of Humphry Clinker, by Tobias Smollett has scenes set at the spa. Fanny Burney's Evelina is partly set in Hotwells, as the eponymous heroine visits Bristol during its spa-town years.

== Demographics ==
The 2001 United Kingdom census recorded Hotwells as two Super Output Area Lower Layers, 034A, the western part of Hotwells and 034C in the east. The latter layer included parts of Cliftonwood. The figures recorded in the two areas were broadly similar with 034A recording a population of 1,485, with about 58% being described as economically active, 17% students and 7% retired. 42% of homes were owner occupied. 50% of residents had university degrees or equivalent. 50% described themselves as Christian and 44% as having no religion. In 034C the figures were a population of 1,522 with about 66% being described as economically active, 12% students and 6.5% retired; 65% of homes were owner occupied; 55% of residents had university degrees or equivalent; 50% described themselves as Christian and 46% as having no religion; and 1,438 persons in 034A were described as white, with 28 of mixed race, 19 Asian, 17 black and 18 Chinese. In 034C 1,374 were described as white, 33 of mixed race, 24 Asian, 24 black and 29 Chinese.

== Education ==
The area is served by two schools, Hotwells Primary School and St George C of E Primary School. The latter has been under threat of closure by Bristol City Council, but is now to be re-evaluated in 2013. The nearest secondary schools are Ashton Park School, Cotham School and Bristol Cathedral Choir School.

== Transport ==
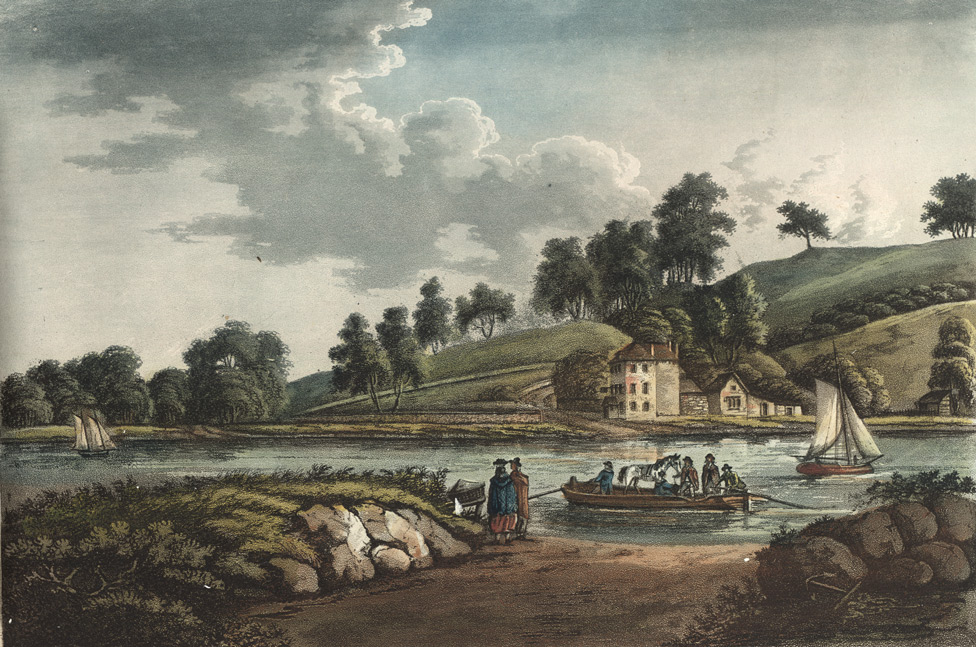
Crossing the Avon to Hotwells in 1797, by John Hassell

Towards the end of the 19th century, the western end of the district was the location of a terminus of a Bristol Tramways route, Hotwells railway station was the city terminus of the Bristol Port Railway and Pier line to Avonmouth, the lower terminus of the Clifton Rocks Railway, the Rownham Ferry which crossed the River Avon to Bower Ashton, the locks giving access to the Floating Harbour, and the landing stages used by passenger steamers. In the 1920s, the A4 Portway Road was driven through the Avon Gorge to provide better access from the city to Avonmouth Docks, in the process removing all signs of the Bristol Port Railway and Pier's station. Since the 1960s, the western end of Hotwells has been dominated by a flyover complex, which enables traffic from the city centre and the A4 Portway to cross the river and harbour entrance locks to access the south west of the city.

Public transport links include buses serving Weston-super-Mare, Clevedon and Portishead which pass through the area. There is a ferry service to the city centre and Temple Meads railway station.

== Politics ==
For elections to Bristol City Council, Hotwells is divided between electoral wards. Areas to the north of Hotwells Road are in Clifton ward; areas south of Hotwells road, and some buildings fronting directly onto the north side of the road, are in Hotwells and Harbourside.

For elections to the Parliament of the United Kingdom, both electoral wards are in the Bristol Central constituency.

== Community ==
Hotwells and Cliftonwood Community Association (HCCA), is a registered charity run by volunteers to improve the quality of life for those who live and work locally. For many years HCCA ran the Hope Centre in the listed Georgian Hope Chapel, which provided a base for community groups and offered a programme of arts events. The Hope Centre closed in 2001 following a loss of funding and the lease was surrendered to the owners, the Congregational Federation. Since 1981 the Hotwells Pantomime group has performed in Hope Chapel every year. The cast and crew are all local and give their time to raise money for local charities and have a great time too.
