= University of Bristol Students' Union =

Student union in the United Kingdom

Coordinates: 51.4569°N 2.6084°W

Bristol SU
- Motto: The best student life
- Institution: University of Bristol
- Location: Senate House, Tyndall Avenue, Bristol, England
- Established: 1924
- Chief Executive: Ben Pilling
- Trustees: www.bristolsu.org.uk/support/su-governance-policy/trustees-and-governance
- Members: c. 22,000
- Affiliations: National Union of Students, Aldwych Group, National Postgraduate Committee, British Universities & Colleges Sport
- Website: www.bristolsu.org.uk

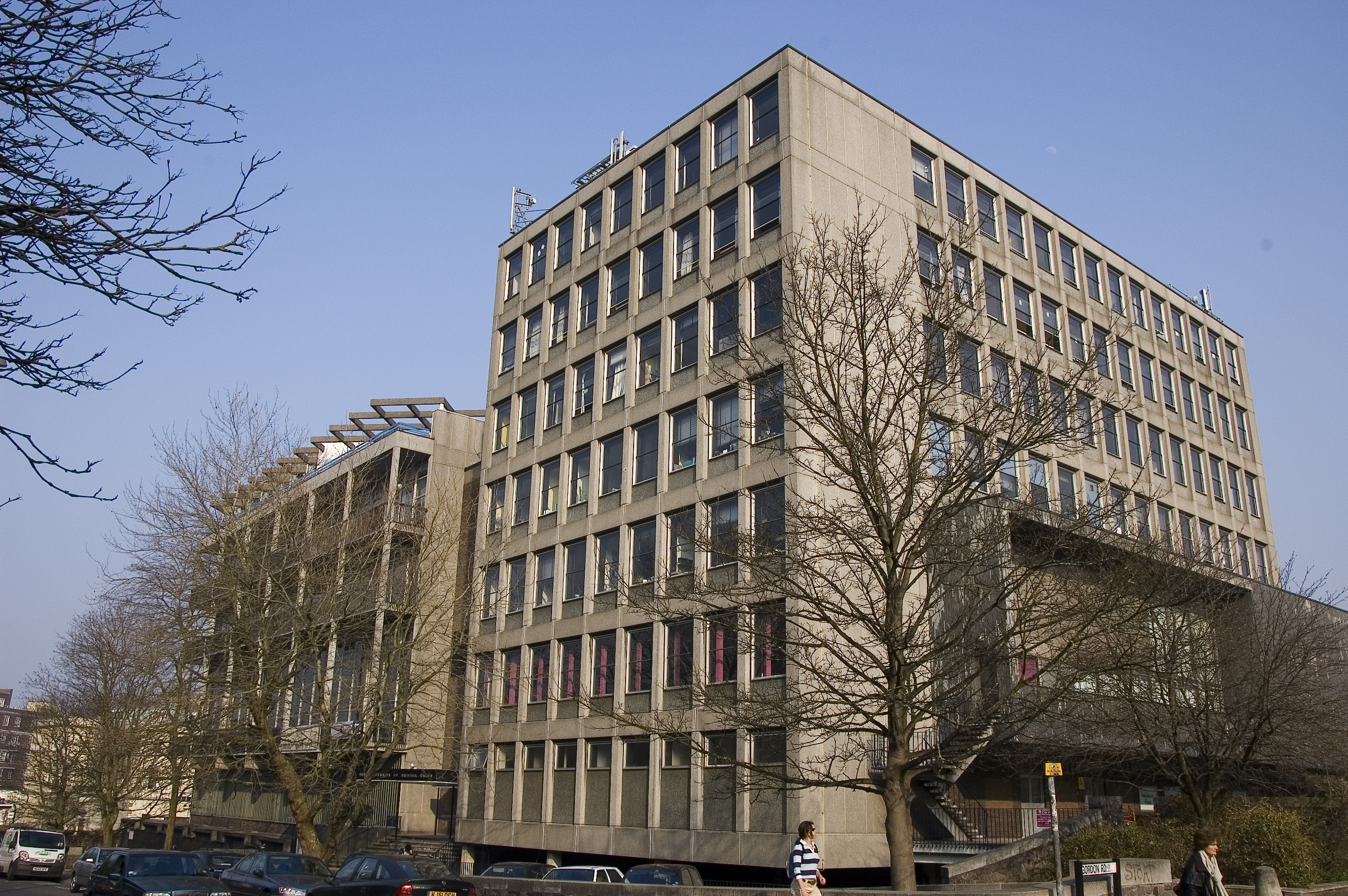
One of the Union's locations: The Richmond Building, on Queens Road in Clifton

The University of Bristol Students' Union (known as Bristol SU) is the students' union of the University of Bristol, England. It is among the oldest of the UK students' unions and was a founding member of the National Union of Students. The Union is a multi-site organisation which can be found at Senate House, Tyndall Avenue, Bristol, BS8 1TH and The Richmond Building, 105 Queens Road, Clifton, Bristol BS8 1LN.

== History ==
The students' union was formed in October 1924 by the merger of the university guild and the university club.

The original home of the students' union was the Victoria Rooms, which was given to the university in 1920. In 1934, a serious fire destroyed the main hall and electric organ of the building, though many of the other areas were saved from serious damage. In 1965, the students' union moved to the Richmond Building on Queens' Road.

A fire in the Richmond building on 15 September 2009 caused its closure. Canoes and other water sporting equipment in a storage area in front of the building caught fire and by 9am was sending "thick black smoke" along the road.

For two days, starting 24 November 2010, a room of the building was occupied by students following the protests in Bristol on the same day. Among other things, the students claimed the union was failing to represent them on issues such as government funding for higher education, and rises to tuition fees. The union was also criticised for not holding an Extraordinary General Meeting (EGM) to discuss these issues. The occupation was ended when the union agreed to call an EGM, which resulted in motions mandating the union to support students opposing tuition fees and cuts in funding to higher education.

An extensive refurbishment of the union building took place in 2014–15. The building was reopened as 'the Richmond Building' in April 2015, and the union was rebranded from 'the University of Bristol Union (UBU)' to 'Bristol SU'.

The University of Bristol and Bristol students' union announced in March 2017 that they would be divesting from fossil fuels. This means they stated as part of a deal that they would dump investments in companies which extract coal and tar sands within a year; review investments in companies extracting oil and gas annually and gradually remove them depending on their polluting potential; and invest three million pounds into a green fund.

In April 2024, Bristol SU became more of a multi-site organisation. Based on student feedback, they brought some of the support and services to Senate House from 22 April 2024. This includes the Welcome Desk, Academic Advice Service, elected SU Officers and other staff right to the heart of campus. Students are still able to access events, activity rooms, study space, and more in the Richmond Building.

=== Former Sabbatical Officers ===
Former union presidents have included the broadcaster, Sue Lawley; St Lucia's foreign minister and ambassador to the United Nations, George W. Odlum; and former Liberal Democrat MP and Leader of the Welsh Liberal Democrats, Lembit Öpik.

== Facilities and activities ==
=== Richmond Building ===
The union was originally housed in the grand Victoria Rooms on the corner of Queen's Road and Whiteladies Road. Today this building houses the University of Bristol's music department. The union is now a multi-site organisation, with spaces in Senate House and the Richmond Building, Queens Road, Clifton.

The Richmond Building is one of the largest students' union buildings in Great Britain. It houses the Anson Rooms gig and performance venue; the 200-seat Winston Theatre; Burst Radio; Photography Dark Rooms; Pottery Studio; Computer Rooms; Epigram (student newspaper) and UBTV offices; various meeting rooms, study spaces and society headquarters. It is also home to the Balloon Bar.

The building was extensively renovated in 2010, including improving energy efficiency and the removal of asbestos. The building has been described as of both the modernist and brutalist architecture styles.

=== Elected officers ===
Bristol SU is run by a team of seven officers who are elected by the student body annually in March. They represent students and have the job of improving the student experience at Bristol. The officer team is made up of Liberation, Equality and Access Officer, Postgraduate Education Officer, Sport and Student Development Officer, Student Living Officer, Undergraduate Education Officer, Union Affairs Officer and International Students Officer.

=== Activities ===
Bristol SU currently offers over 400 societies, sports clubs and networks covering a wide range of activities. All societies and clubs are entirely student-run by their elected committees, and are supported by the union.

== See also ==
- National Union of Students of the United Kingdom
