= Redcliffe Hall, Bristol =

Theatre in Bristol, England

Coordinates: 51.44748°N 2.59064°W

Redcliffe Hall was an early purpose-built playhouse on Redcliffe Hill, Bristol, England operating in the 17th century. It was built by Richard Barker, certainly before 1637 and possibly as early as 1604. Together with the Wine Street playhouse, Bristol thus had two purpose-built theatres, more than any other provincial city of the time.
