= Miss in Her Teens =

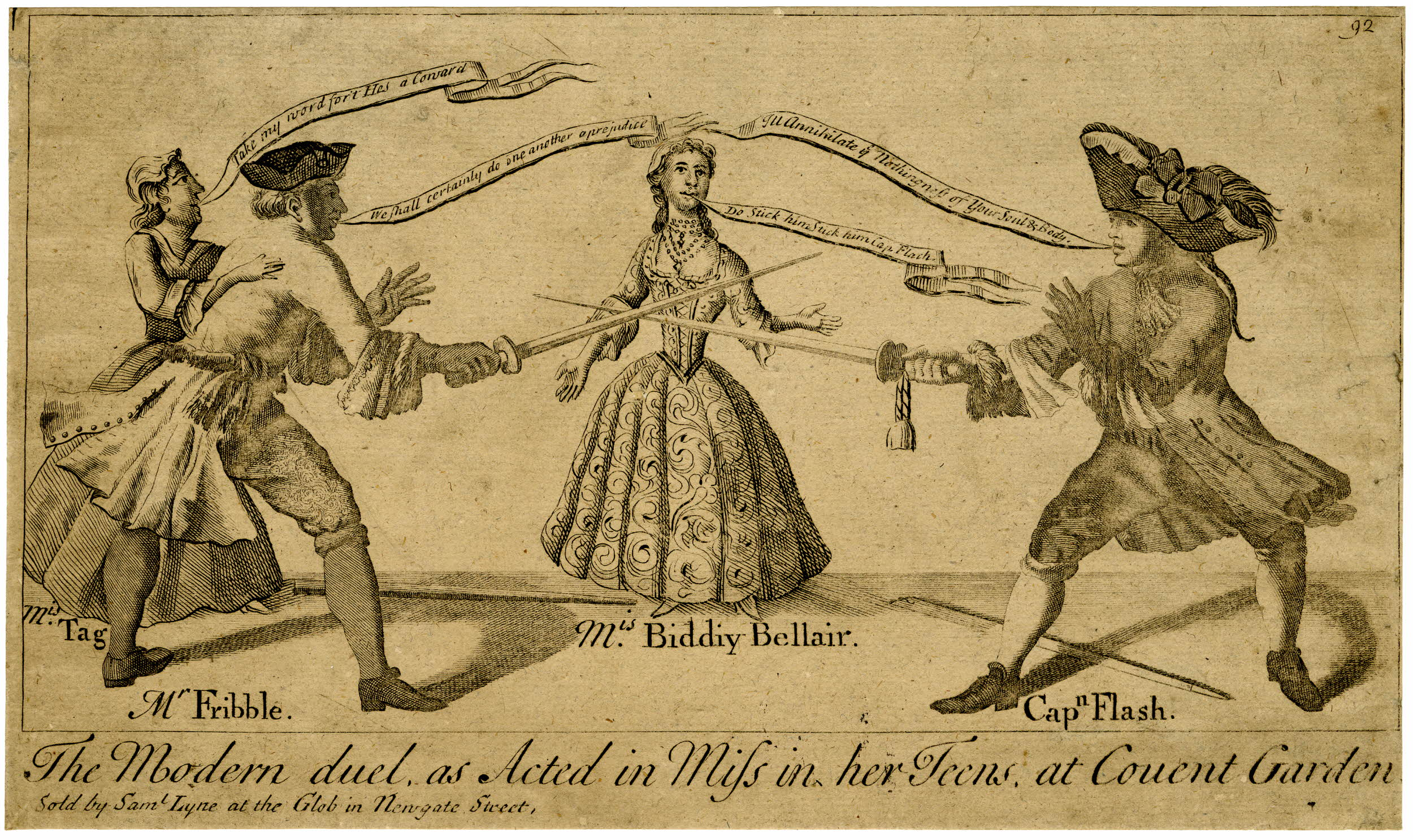
The Modern Duel as Acted in Miss in her Teens, at Covent Garden. Print, published by Samuel Lyne, London, c. 1747.

Miss in Her Teens; or The Medley of Lovers is a farce (or afterpiece) written in 1747 by David Garrick. It was adapted from Florent Carton Dancourt's 1691 play La Parisienne. It was the third play written by Garrick, and was first performed on 17 January 1747 at Covent Garden.

The play concerns a young woman, Miss Biddy, and her various suitors.

Mary Delany saw Miss in Her Teens in 1747 and remarked of the play in correspondence that "nothing can be lower". Of Garrick's performance she remarked that "...the part he acts in himself (Mr. Fribble) he makes so ridiculous that it is very entertaining" and added that "It is said that he mimics eleven men of fashion". A 1798 performance was attended by George III and the British royal family. Eliza Poe, the mother of writer Edgar Allan Poe made her stage debut in Miss in Her Teens at the age of nine, playing Biddy Blair.

== Film adaptation ==
In 2014 a feature-length film of the play was released starring Simon Callow as 'The Author', Adam Alexander as 'Captain Loveit', Tori Hart as 'Miss Biddy Belair', Carol Royle as 'Aunt', Alex Hassell as 'The Player', with the prologue narrated by Ian McKellen.

== External source ==
- Meyers, Jeffrey. Edgar Allan Poe: His Life and Legacy. New York City: Cooper Square Press, 1992. ISBN 0-8154-1038-7.
