= Culture in Bristol =

Bristol is a city in South West England. As the largest city in the region it is a centre for the arts and sport. The region has a distinct West Country dialect.

== Events ==
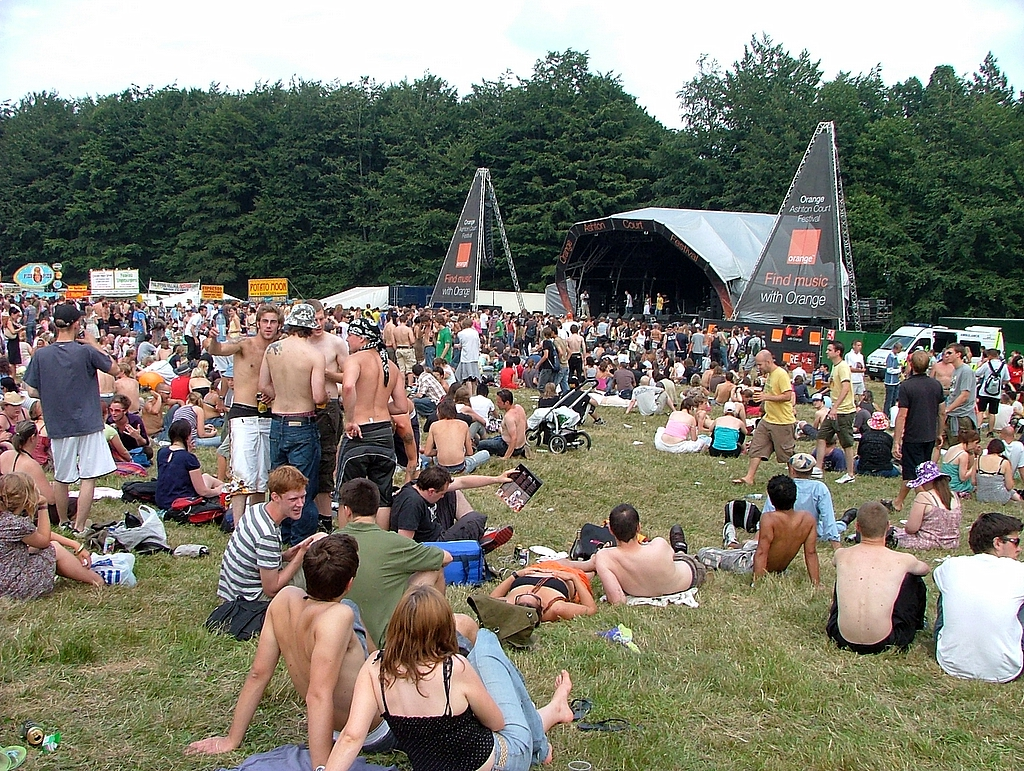
Se Fire on the Main Stage at the Ashton Court Festival

In summer the grounds of Ashton Court to the west of the city play host to the Bristol International Balloon Fiesta, a major event for hot air ballooning in Britain. The Fiesta draws a substantial crowd even for the early morning lift that typically begins at about 6.30 am. Events and a fairground entertain the crowds during the day. A second mass ascent is then made in the early evening, again taking advantage of lower wind speeds.

The annual Bristol International Festival of Kites and Air Creations, featuring kite makers and flyers from around the world, takes place in September at Ashton Court.

From 1974 until 2007, Ashton Court also played host to the Ashton Court festival each summer, an outdoors music festival which used to be known as the Bristol Community Festival. Torrential rain during the 2007 festival and mounting costs incurred as a result of the Licensing Act 2003 led to the dissolution of the not-for-profit company which organised the event.

The annual Bristol Harbour Festival features displays of tall ships and musical performances. The St Pauls Carnival takes place in Bristol during the summer and features a procession and late night music.

The Slapstick Festival celebrates silent film comedy every January and the organisation also promotes screenings throughout the year. In September, Encounters Film Festival offers a platform for short films from all over the world. Encounters is a qualifying event for the BAFTA, the British Independent Film Awards, and the European Film Awards, and has launched the careers of filmmakers including Charlotte Wells, Lynne Ramsay and Julia Ducournau. The biennial Wildscreen Festival showcases wildlife filmmaking in the city that is home to the BBC Natural History Unit.

The Great Reading Adventure was introduced in 2003 as part of Bristol's bid to be European Capital of Culture 2008. It was inspired by an equivalent scheme in Chicago, where they were reading Harper Lee's To Kill a Mockingbird. In its first year in excess of 15,000 people read Treasure Island by Robert Louis Stevenson as part of the scheme. The Bristol Art Library (TBAL) is an art performance project created in 1998 by British artist Annabel Other. It consists of handmade books in a library the size of a suitcase.

The Bristol Festival of Ideas is an annual programme of debates and other events, which aims "to stimulate people’s minds and passions with an inspiring programme of discussion and debate". It was first set up in 2005 as part of the city's ultimately unsuccessful bid to become the European Capital of Culture for 2008, and awards an annual book prize, worth £10,000, to a book which "presents new, important and challenging ideas, which is rigorously argued, and which is engaging and accessible".

== Theatres ==
=== Bristol Old Vic ===
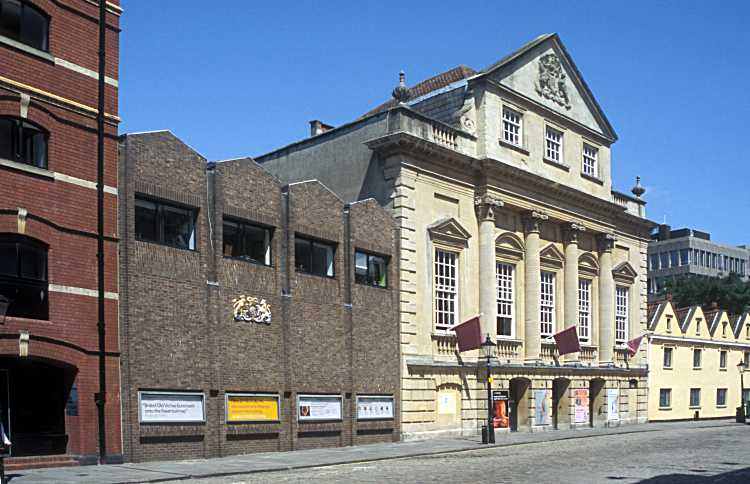
The Old Vic.

The city's principal theatre company, the Bristol Old Vic, was founded in 1946 as an offshoot of The Old Vic company in London. Its premises on King Street consist of the 1766 Theatre Royal (400 seats), a modern studio theatre (150 seats), and foyer and bar areas in the adjacent Coopers' Hall (built 1743). The Theatre Royal is a grade I listed building and was the oldest continuously operating theatre in England.

The Bristol Old Vic Theatre School, which originated in King Street as an offshoot of the Bristol Old Vic is now a separate company. Based in Clifton in a property bought with royalties from Julian Slade's musical Salad Days, the school trains actors, stage managers, directors, lighting and sound technicians, designers and costumiers for work in stage, television, radio and film productions. BOVTS is an Associate School of the Faculty of Creative Arts of the University of the West of England and an affiliate of the Conservatoire for Dance and Drama. Alumni include Annette Crosbie, Brian Blessed, Daniel Day-Lewis, Gene Wilder, Jane Lapotaire, Jeremy Irons, Miranda Richardson, Patrick Stewart, Pete Postlethwaite, Stephanie Cole and Tim Pigott-Smith.

=== Bristol Hippodrome ===
The Bristol Hippodrome is a larger theatre (1981 seats) which hosts national touring productions, whilst other theatres include the Tobacco Factory (250 seats), The Brewery (90 seats), Bierkeller Theatre (400 seats), QEH (220 seats), the Redgrave Theatre (at Clifton College) (320 seats) and the Alma Tavern (50 seats). Arnolfini stage a regular programme of experimental, physical and live art theatre and the University of Bristol Drama Department has a regular programme of visiting companies and in-house work at the Wickham Theatre. Other venues which have hosted theatre productions include Hope Chapel (Hotwells) (formerly the Hope Centre), the Hen and Chicken pub (Bedminster) and PACTS (Easton).

=== Other theatres ===
Bristol's theatre scene includes a large variety of producing theatre companies, apart from the Bristol Old Vic, including Show of Strength Theatre Company, Shakespeare at the Tobacco Factory, acta community theatre, Myrtle Theatre, Cirque Bijou, Desperate Men, Theatre West and Travelling Light Theatre Company. Theatre Bristol is a partnership between Bristol City Council, Arts Council England and local theatre practitioners which aims to develop the theatre industry in Bristol. The city is also home to the South West's first impovisational theatre, Bristol Improv Theatre. There are also a number of organisations within the city which act to support theatre makers, for example Equity, the actors union, has a General Branch based in the city, and Residence which provides office, social and rehearsal space for several Bristol based theatre and performance companies.

The University of Bristol Drama Department offers undergraduate and post-graduate degrees in performance and screen studies. The University of the West of England offers undergraduate and post-graduate drama and film programmes. Circomedia is a training school for circus and physical theatre skills offering foundation degrees and BTEC courses.

In addition there are around 25 active non-professional theatre companies in the Greater Bristol area listed in Bristol City Council's Leisure and Culture database. Mayfest is an annual contemporary theatre festival that takes place for two weeks in May. It is best known for presenting contemporary theatre but also dance, site specific, experimental, interactive and participatory theatre as well as music events.

== Music ==
The music scene is thriving and significant. In 2010, PRS for Music announced that Bristol is the 'most musical' city in the UK, based on the number of PRS members born in Bristol relative to its population. From the late 1970s onwards it was home to a crop of cultish bands combining punk, funk, dub and political consciousness, including The Pop Group, close friends of The Cortinas, who led the city's punk scene from 1976. Bristol's premier fanzine from this time through until early 1978 was Loaded. It featured all of the Bristol bands as well as those who visited the city, some of whom were promoted by the magazine.

Ten years later, Bristol was the birthplace of a type of English hip-hop music called trip hop or the Bristol Sound, epitomised in the work of artists such as Tricky, Portishead, Smith & Mighty and Massive Attack. It is also a stronghold of drum and bass with notable bands like the Mercury Prize winning Roni Size /Reprazent and Kosheen as well as the pioneering DJ Krust and More Rockers. The progressive house duo Way Out West also hails from Bristol. This music is part of the wider Bristol Urban Culture scene which received international media attention in the 1990s and still thrives today.

Other forms of popular music also thrive on the city's scene. In the 1980s the city gave birth to thrash metal band Onslaught who became the first non-American thrash band to sign to a major label. Other notable rockers from Bristol include folk rock outfit K-Passa, Stackridge, Act of Contrition, Chaos UK, Vice Squad, Wushcatte, The Claytown Troupe, Rita Lynch, Herb Garden, Doreen Doreen, The Seers, Pigbag, and The Blue Aeroplanes. More recently a new wave of Bristol-based bands have been promoting themselves across the UK underground, including New Rhodes, Santa Dog, Tin Pan Gang, The Private Side, Big Joan, You and the Atom Bomb, Riot:Noise, Two Day Rule, Alien Trash Bin, Osmium, Hacksaw, Bronze Age Fox and Legends De Early.

There is also a left field / experimental music scene in Bristol, which has built on the tradition of Bristol bands like The Pop Group, Third Eye Foundation and Crescent. These musicians are supported by record labels such as Invada, Farm Girl, Blood Red Sound and Super Fi, and promoters such as Qu Junktions, Illegal Seagull, Let the Bastards Grind, Noise Annoys and the, now defunct, Choke (music collective). Despite regular performances and the success of many of its members, this scene tends to be passed over in the national press' view of Bristol music which focuses on Trip Hop, which represents only one aspect of the city's musical culture. Active bands include Gravenhurst (Warp), Team Brick (Invada), The Heads (Invada), Gonga (Invada), Joe Volk (Invada), Fuck Buttons (ATP – now moved to London), Hunting Lodge (Yosada), SJ Esau (Anticon, Twisted Nerve), Bronnt Industries Kapital (Static Caravan), Zoon van snooK (Lo Recordings, Mush Records), Aut (Fällt), Geisha (Crucial Blast) and Defibrillators (Gravid Hands). Bristol was also a home to post-rock music, with bands such as Flying Saucer Attack and Movietone.

Bristol is home to many live music venues including the 2000-seat Bristol Beacon, which can attract big names, the Trinity Centre (a community-run converted Church in the Old Market area of Bristol), the O2 Academy which is part of the national touring circuit for rock bands, the Anson Rooms (part of the University of Bristol Union), the Mothers Ruin, The Thekla, Fiddler's, the Bristol Folk House, Start the Bus, the Hatchet, the Fleece, the Croft, the Cooler and the Louisiana.

The city also has a popular jazz and blues scene with The Old Duke pub being a popular venue for bands such as Fortune Drive. Internationally recognised jazz and blues musicians active in Bristol include Eddie Martin, Jim Blomfield and Andy Sheppard. Other notable supporters of jazz include the Bristol Jazz Society, the Be-Bop Club and the East Bristol Jazz Club. St George's Bristol, on Brandon Hill, Bristol, is notable for its jazz along with classical and world music performances.

The International Classical Season at the Bristol Beacon features regular performances by the Bournemouth Symphony Orchestra as well as other leading British orchestras such as the Philharmonia Orchestra and visiting orchestras from abroad, including the Moscow Philharmonic Orchestra, Warsaw Philharmonic Orchestra and Berliner Symphoniker in the 2011–2012 season. Bristol Choral Society also stages at least three concerts annually at the Colston Hall, as it has since its foundation in 1889. The Orchestra of the Age of Enlightenment and Brodsky Quartet, among other internationally renowned ensembles, as well as local groups such as Bristol Bach Choir and the Bristol Ensemble, regularly perform at St George's Bristol, which also hosts BBC Radio Three lunchtime concert series. Bristol University's Victoria Rooms also have a seasonal programme of classical concerts, and other concerts are frequently staged at Bristol Cathedral and various Bristol churches.

== Museums and galleries ==
=== Bristol City Museum and Art Gallery ===
The Bristol Museum & Art Gallery houses collections of natural history, local archaeology, local glassware, Egyptology, Chinese ceramics and art, including the Bristol School. Touring exhibitions from other galleries are regularly hosted.

The City Museum is also responsible for

- The Tudor Red Lodge, built in 1580 as the lodge for a 'Great House' which once stood on the site now occupied by the Bristol Beacon. Displays include Tudor and Georgian rooms and a Tudor knot garden.
- The Georgian House was built by slave trader and plantation owner John Pinney in 1790 and is preserved in the style of a Georgian-era town house.
- The Blaise Castle House and estate on the northern outskirts of the city houses the social history collections. The grounds were designed by 18th century landscape gardener Humphry Repton and John Nash designed the dairy and conservatory.
- The remains of Kings Weston Roman Villa which is open on request.

=== Arnolfini ===
Arnolfini specialises in contemporary art, live performance and dance and cinema.

=== Spike Island ===
Spike Island is an international centre for the development of contemporary art and design, home to a gallery, café and working space for artists, designers and creative businesses.

=== Other cultural venues ===
The Watershed Media Centre exhibits digital arts and cinema. The former Industrial Museum, housed in former warehouses at Prince's Wharf has been extensively rebuilt and, now called M Shed opened as a museum of Bristol life in 2011.

Bristol Archives in Hotwells houses the extensive city archives. The Royal West of England Academy in Clifton was founded in 1849 and exhibits works by William James Müller and Francis Danby amongst others.

The Alexander Gallery, F-block at the School of Creative Arts, Bower Ashton, Bristol Architecture Centre and Glenside Museum. The Bristol Guild of Applied Art also had a small gallery. Science interests are catered for by the At-Bristol complex at Canon's Marsh, which includes 'hands-on' exhibits and a planetarium. Antlers Gallery, a gallery nomadic by design produces temporary exhibitions across varying locations in Bristol.

A variety of youth clubs and day and residential activities, including National Citizen Service, are run by Young Bristol.

== Cinemas ==
From the early twentieth century, Bristol had a number of cinemas including the Whiteladies Picture House, Academy, Bedminster Hippodrome, Ashton Cinema, Prince's Theatre and Coliseum Picture House.

Operational cinemas in Bristol (as of May 2016)
Operator	Cinema	Area	Screens
Odeon Cinema		Broadmead	3
Showcase Cinema	Standard	St Philip's Marsh	14
Showcase Cinema	"De Lux"	Cabot Circus	14
Watershed		harbourside	3
Cube Microplex		Kingsdown	1
Everyman Cinema		Clifton	3
Scott Cinemas	Orpheus Cinema	Henleaze	3
Cineworld		Hengrove	12
Vue Cinemas		Longwell Green	13
Vue Cinemas		Cribbs Causeway	12

== Architecture ==
Bristol's architecture includes many examples of mediaeval, gothic, modern industrial and post-war architecture. Notable buildings include the gothic revival Wills Memorial Building, and the tallest building in the city, St Mary Redcliffe. The city is noted for its Victorian industrial architecture of the Bristol Byzantine style, characterised by deep red and polychrome brickwork and Byzantine style arches.

The city has examples through the changing styles of British Architecture, mediaeval era onwards. Little remains of the old walled city and castle fortifications while multiple 12th century churches have survived. The Tudor period saw large mansions and estates built for wealthy merchants outside the traditional city centre; in contrast to public houses and old Almshouses. In the eighteenth century, squares were laid out for the prosperous middle classes filling in land between the city and the immediate surrounding villages. A floating harbour developed to provided a focus for industrial development and the local transport infrastructure including the Clifton Suspension Bridge and Temple Meads railway station, the original part of which was designed by Isambard Kingdom Brunel.

The early and late twentieth century saw further expansion of the city. The University of Bristol was formed. An aircraft industry grew shortly before and during World War II, post-war this led to the creation of Bristol Airport. The city centre and harbour suffered from extensive bombing during the Bristol Blitz; with planned shopping, leisure and office complexes replacing lost parts of the centre while housing and port were displaced onto the city's outskirts.

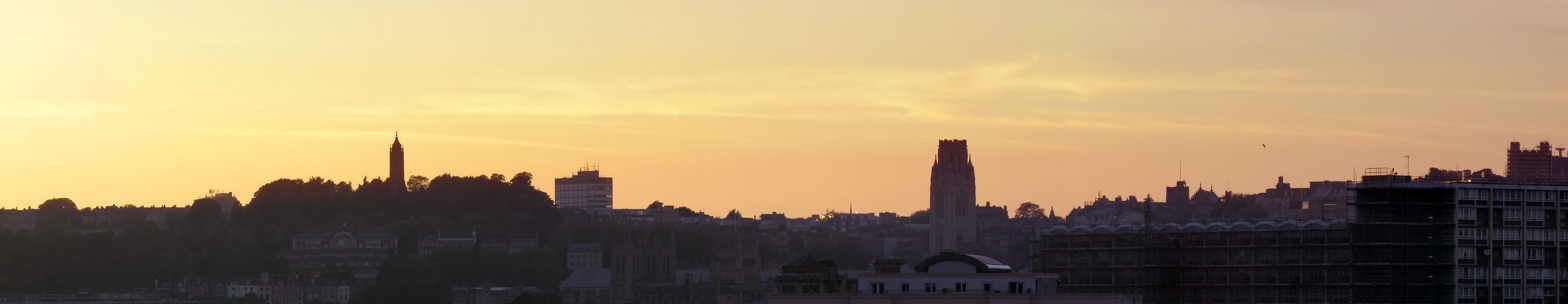
Bristol's skyline at sunset, from Bedminster

== Sport ==
Bristol is the home of two major football clubs – Bristol City FC and Bristol Rovers FC, the Gloucestershire County Cricket Club, and Bristol Rugby Football Club. It also hosts an annual half marathon. The city has a large number of amateur football, cricket and rugby clubs and many active participants in a range of sports from tennis to athletics, and rowing to golf.

== Cuisine ==
Bristol has 15 Michelin-starred restaurants as of August 2022, including Casamia, winner of Ramsay's Best Restaurant in 2010. Bristol also hosts the UK's largest restaurant, Za Za Bazaar. In close proximity to the orchards of Somerset, Bristol has acquired a reputation as "England's most cider-friendly city", and is also home to Harveys Bristol Cream sherry. Other foodstuffs claiming Bristolian heritage include the Clark's Pie, and Mothering Buns. Bristol was named the top city in the world for vegans in 2020 according to a Google Trends analysis, and the world's best culinary destination in 2019.

The oldest pub in Bristol is claimed to be the Hatchett Inn, situated on Frogmore street since 1606, although The Bowl Inn and The Rummer descend from even earlier pubs on their sites.

== Dialect ==
Bristolians speak a distinctive dialect of West Country English. Uniquely for a large city in England, this is a rhotic dialect, in which the r in words like car and park is pronounced, usually nowadays as a postalveolar approximant but more traditionally as a retroflex approximant. Once common across England, this feature has now receded to Bristol and the rural West Country, as well as parts of Lancashire.

The most unusual feature of this dialect, unique to Bristol, is the Bristol L (or Terminal L), in which an L sound is appended to words that end in the letter a: a common illustration of this is the sentence "Africal is a malarial areal" ("Africa is a malarial area"). Additionally,-awing can receive an intrusive l, becoming -awling'. Thus "area" becomes "areawl", and "drawing" becomes "drawling", etc. This may lead to confusions between expressions like area engineer and aerial engineer which in Bristolian sound identical. Another example is when unsure of the answer "I have no ideal" is the response. In the same way, the Swedish IKEA is known by some as "Ikeawl", and Asda supermarket as "Asdawl". The city's own name may have evolved in the same manner, as it transformed from Anglo-Saxon Brycgstow to modern "Bristol." The Bristol L, though disappearing since the late 20th century, is often further transformed by L vocalisation.

Another feature is the addition of S to verbs in the first and third person. Just as he goes, in Bristol I goes and they goes. As with other west country accents, H is often dropped from the start of words, th may become f, and -ing become -en. Bristolians often add "mind", "look" or "see" to the end of sentences: "I'm not doing that, mind." Another Bristolian linguistic feature is the addition of "to" in questions relating to direction or orientation. For example, "Where's that?" would be phrased as "Where's that to?" and "Where's the park?" would become "Where's the park to?" This speech feature is predominant in Newfoundland English, where many of that island's early European inhabitants originated from Bristol and other West Country ports. They lived on the island in relative isolation in the centuries to follow, maintaining this feature. These linguistic features can also be heard in Cardiff.

The linguist John C Wells codified the differences between a Bristol accent and Received Pronunciation in his Accents of English series in the following way, which resembles General American much more than most other accents in Britain:

RP English	Bristol
/ɑː/ as in 'bath'	[a]
/ɑː/ as in 'start'	[aɻ]
/e/ as in 'dress'	[ɛ]
/iː/ as in 'fleece'	[i]
/aɪ/ as in 'price'	(rounded) [ɑɪ]
/əʊ/ as in 'goat'	[ɔʊ]
/eɪ/ as in 'face'	[ɛɪ]
/ɔː/ as in 'thought'	[ɔ]
/uː/ as in 'goose'	[u]
/ɪə/ as in 'near'	[iɻ]
/eə/ as in 'square'	[ɛ(ɪ)ɻ]
/ɔː/ as in 'force'	[ɔɻ]
/ɜː/ as in nurse	[ɝ]
/uə/ as in 'cure'	[uɻ] or [ɔɻ]
/ə/ as in 'letter'	[ɚ]
/ə/ as in 'comma'	[ə], [ə̹], [əɫ], [əw]

== Graffiti ==
There are several graffiti artists active in Bristol; one of whom is Banksy, who produced the album cover for Think Tank by britpop band Blur. Other Bristol graffiti artists include Nick Walker, Sickboy, Inkie, Stars, Lokey, cheo.

Massive Attack's Robert Del Naja was the first strongly active graffiti artist in Bristol in the early 1980s, with the nicknames of "3D" and "Delge". He appeared in the UK documentary called "Bombin'" alongside Wolverhampton artist and later DJ and producer Goldie.

Children of the Can: 25 Years of Bristol Graffiti by Felix Braun (FLX) and Steve Wright, is a book illustrating and documenting the street art scene in the city.

900,000 people visited an exhibition of Banksy's work at the Bristol Museum in 2009. In August 2011 Bristol City Council finally recognised the importance of graffiti to the city's culture by allowing an entire street to be painted by various international street artists. In August 2011 the See No Evil public art event was installed in Nelson Street, transforming it into a walk-through graffiti gallery. Among other works, it includes a 20-metre-tall (66 ft) mural on St Lawrence House.

== See also ==
- Media in Bristol
- List of bands from Bristol
- Category:Music venues in Bristol
