= Occam's Razor (disambiguation) =

Occam's Razor or Ockham's Razor usually refers to Occam's razor, the philosophical principle. It may also refer to:

- Ockham's Razor Theatre Company
- "Occam's Razor" (House), a 2004 television episode
- "Occam's Razor" (The Watcher), a 2022 television episode
