= Arnolfini, Bristol =

Arts centre in England

Arnolfini
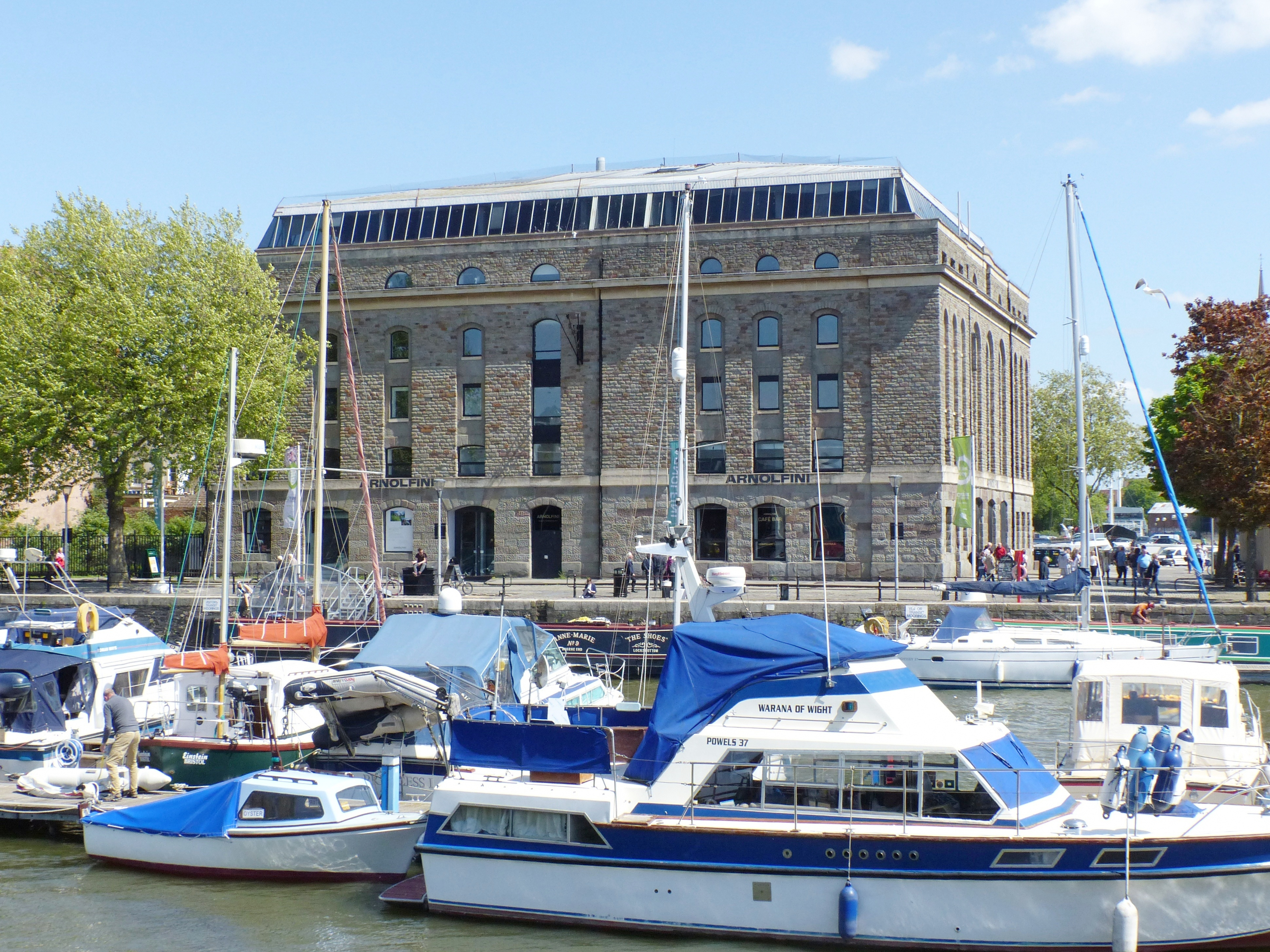
- The Arnolfini

- Location map for Arnolfini
- Established: 1961
- Location: Bristol, England
- Coordinates: 51.4492°N 2.5972°W
- Type: Art Gallery, Performance Arts, Cinema
- Visitors: 500,000 (2013/2014)
- Website: arnolfini.org.uk

Listed Building – Grade II*
- Official name: Bush House
- Designated: 20 June 1973
- Reference no.: 1282181

Arnolfini is an international arts centre and gallery in Bristol, England. It has a programme of contemporary art exhibitions, artist's performance, music and dance events, poetry and book readings, talks, lectures and cinema. There is also a specialist art bookshop and a café bar. Educational activities are undertaken and experimental digital media work supported by online resources. Festivals are hosted by the gallery.

The gallery was founded in 1961 by Jeremy Rees, and was located in Clifton. In the 1970s it moved to Queen Square, before moving to its present location, Bush House on Bristol's waterfront, in 1975. The name of the gallery is taken from Jan van Eyck's 15th-century painting The Arnolfini Portrait. Arnolfini was refurbished and redeveloped in 1989 and 2005. Artists whose work has been exhibited include Paul McCartney, Bridget Riley, Rachel Whiteread, Richard Long and Jack Yeats. Performers have included Goat Island Performance Group, the Philip Glass Ensemble, and Shobana Jeyasingh Dance Company. The gallery reached a new audience in April 2010, when it was chosen to host one of the three 2010 general election debates.

== History ==
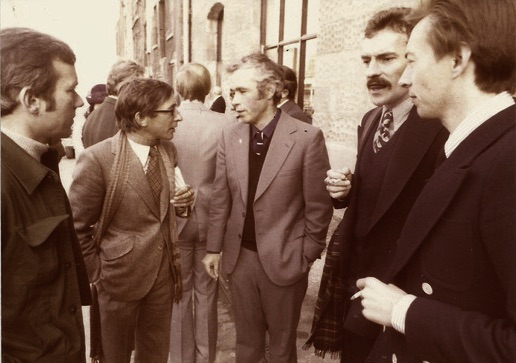
Reopening of the Arnolfini at Bush House, 1975. From left to right: Jean Beaudrand, John Kasmin, Howard Hodgkin, Nigel Greenwood and Barry Barker (who later became director)

Jeremy Rees started Arnolfini with the assistance of his wife Annabel, and the painter John Orsborn in 1961. The location was above a bookshop in the Triangle in Clifton, Bristol. In 1968, Rees was able to give up his teaching job and with the aid of private funding and Arts Council funding relocated the gallery to Queen Square, then to W Shed, later the home of the Watershed Media Centre. In 1975, Arnolfini moved to its present home in Bush House, occupying two floors of a 19th-century Grade II* listed tea warehouse situated on the side of the Floating Harbour in Bristol City Centre. The first two simultaneous shows at the new location were by British artists Howard Hodgkin (ground floor) and Keith Milow (upper floor). The remainder of the building was office space leased out by developers JT Group.

Originally dedicated to exhibiting the work of artists from the West of England, under the directorship of Barry Barker (1986–1991) the gallery moved towards a more general spread of contemporary art. Barker supervised a refurbishment of the gallery spaces and café bar by David Chipperfield. Before development work began, Arnolfini was attracting over 285,000 visitors per year. Subsequent Directors have been Tessa Jackson (1991–1999), Caroline Collier (1999–2005) and Tom Trevor (2005–2013).

As part of a two-year development project that finished in September 2005, the old warehouse has been redeveloped, adding another attic storey. Arnolfini now occupies the lower three floors and basement, and the upper floors are leased to help pay for the running costs. One tenant is the School of Creative Arts, part of the University of the West of England. Funding for this development was received from the National Lottery and the Barker-Mill Trust, set up by long term Arnolfini patron Peter Barker-Mill. The original committee to support Arnolfini included Peter Barker-Mill, Ann Hewer, and Lawrence Ogilvie.

In July 2015, Bush House was sold to the University of the West of England, with a lease-back of the artistic space. The profits from the sale replenished Arnolfini's endowment fund.

== Bush House ==
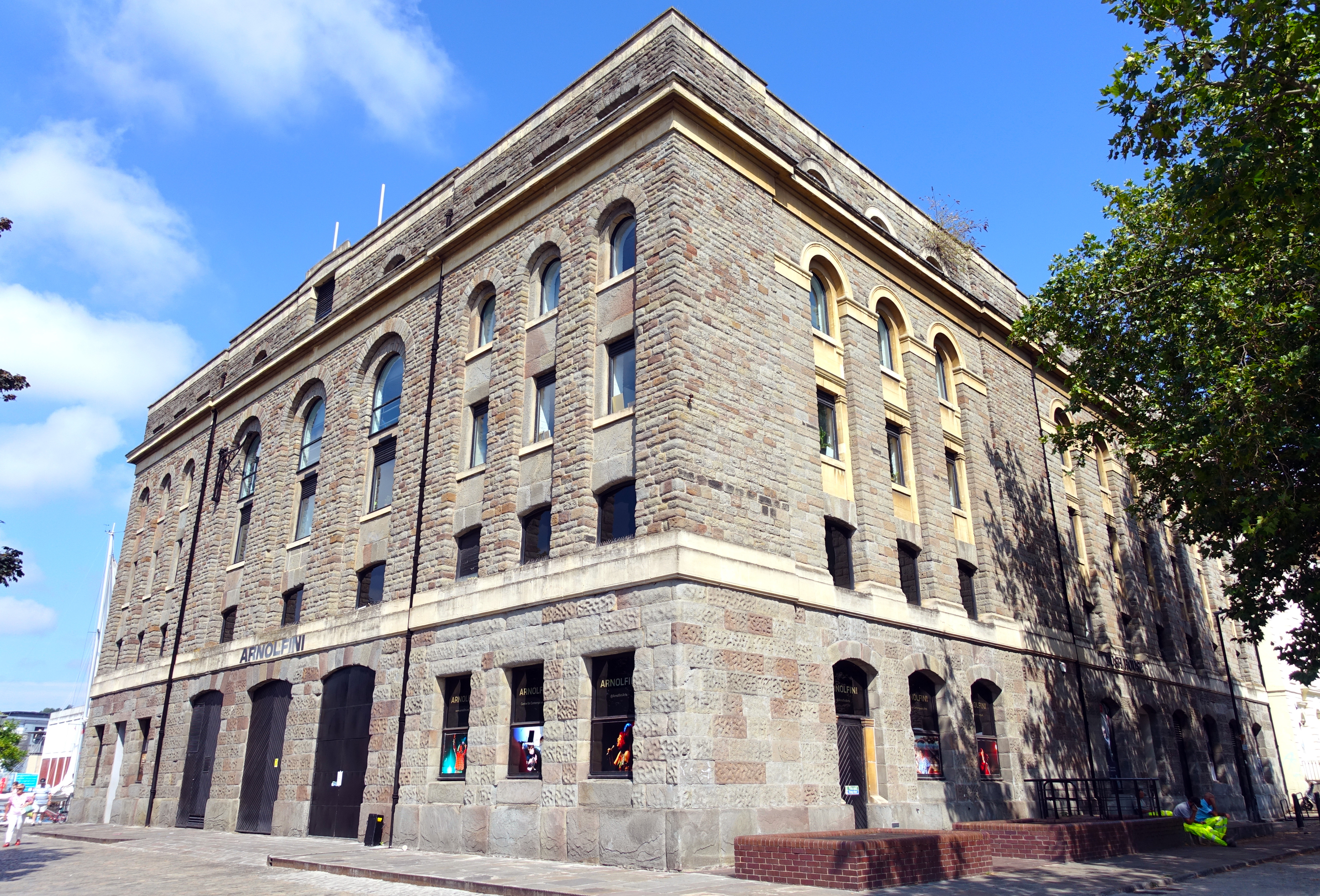
The Bush House

The architect of Bush House was Richard Shackleton Pope, who first constructed the south part of the warehouse (1831) then extended it to the north in 1835–1836. Its original use was as a warehouse for local iron foundry D., E. & A. Acraman. The building has a Pennant Sandstone exterior with arched ground level entrances and arched windows above. This style of architecture is the first example of the Bristol Byzantine style which became popular in the 1850s. Later conversion to a tea warehouse added interstitial floors.

== Archives ==
Records of Arnolfini, including a collection of artist books, are held at Bristol Archives (Ref. 44371) (online catalogue).

== Name ==
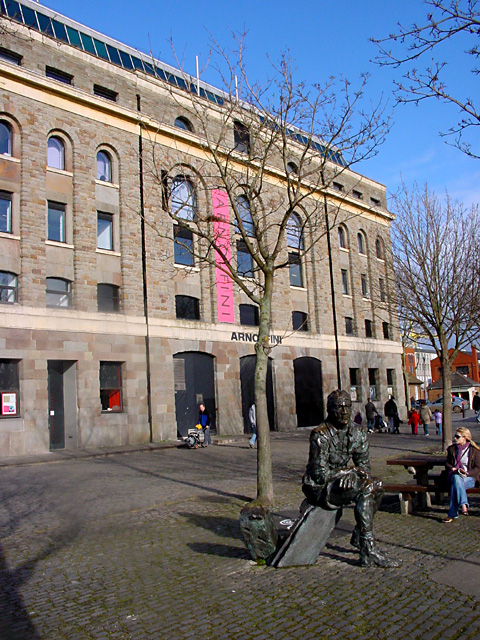
John Cabot's statue outside the Arnolfini

The Arnolfini is named after Jan van Eyck's masterpiece The Arnolfini Portrait (1434) depicting the merchant and arts patron Giovanni Arnolfini. The Arnolfini Portrait is one of the earliest paintings to assert the presence of the artist within its depiction (an inscription in the middle of the work and a reflection in a mirror on the back wall). One of Arnolfini's consistent concerns is to explore the role of artist as a witness and recorder of what is around them – contemporary society. The painting is in the National Gallery, London and it was one of the founder's favourite paintings.

== Today ==
Arnolfini has three floors of galleries, a specialist arts bookshop, a cinema which can also be used as a performance space for theatre, live art, dance and music, a reading room that provides reference material for all past exhibitions, books and catalogues, and a café bar. Entrance to the galleries is free of charge. Notable exhibitions have included works by Bridget Riley, Richard Long, Rachel Whiteread, Paul McCartney, Angus Fairhurst and Louise Bourgeois. Events include poetry and film festivals, live art and dance performances, lectures and jazz and experimental music concerts, including Bodies in Flight, Goat Island Performance Group, Akram Khan, the London Sinfonietta, the Philip Glass Ensemble, Random Dance, and Shobana Jeyasingh Dance Company.

There is an access and education programme, hosting visits from students, workshops with artists, presenting interpretative information and offering some work experience placements within the gallery. project.ARNOLFINI is an online experimental web site with dumps of digital media related to Arnolfini exhibitions and events, past and present, which may be reorganised by any online user, utilising resources on the web site to create new works and projects under a copyleft license. Arnolfini also hosts events from outside organisations, including the Encounters Short Film Festival (along with the Watershed Media Centre), Mayfest, the first Festival of British Independent Cinema, the biennial Inbetween Time Festival of Live Art and Intrigue and the Bristol Artists Book Events. In April 2010, British Sky Broadcasting chose Arnolfini to host the second of the three 2010 general election debates.

Arnolfini receives funding from Arts Council England, and Bristol City Council. According to returns lodged with the Charity Commission for the year ending in March 2016, Arnolfini had 500,000 visitors in 2013/2014. Income was £2.1 million and expenditure was £2.7 million and the gallery employed 44 people.

In 2017 the Arnolfini, which had asked for increased funding in recent years, lost its Arts Council England £750,000 annual grant after an assessment that the Arnolfini was "not viable" in its current model.

In 2017 a new director, Claire Doherty, was appointed. She aimed to devise a viable financial model. A show by Grayson Perry was very successful.

In 2019, with new executive director Gary Topp, Arts Council England funding was reinstated. The partnership with UWE Bristol, who were custodians of Bush House, was strengthened.

In 2023 Arnolfini faced backlash after cancelling two Palestinian film events over concerns they would be construed as political.

== See also ==
- Grade II* listed buildings in Bristol
- Royal West of England Academy
