= Mayfest (Bristol) =

Theatre festival in Bristol, England

Mayfest is an annual contemporary theatre festival that takes place in Bristol for two weeks in May. It is best known for presenting contemporary theatre but also dance, site specific, experimental, interactive and participatory theatre as well as music events.

The festival hosts national, international and local artists and is run across various venues throughout the city of Bristol, including Bristol Old Vic, Arnolfini, Tobacco Factory Theatre, Circomedia and others.

Mayfest has received funding from Arts Council England through Grants for Arts. It is co-produced by Bristol Old Vic.

It was described in 2012 by The Guardian as "the place to go to see work that pushes hard at what theatre can be"

== History ==
Mayfest was established in 2003 by the then Artistic Directors of Bristol Old Vic David Farr and Simon Reade, and between 2003 and 2006 was largely based in Bristol Old Vic's Studio Theatre. In 2007, the festival was taken on as an independent venture by Kate Yedigaroff and Matthew Austin, produced in collaboration with Bristol Old Vic. In 2011, Yedigaroff and Austin launched a producing organisation, MAYK, which continues to produce the festival with Bristol Old Vic.

There has been no Mayfest since 2020.

List of companies and artists who have performed in Mayfest:

=== 2013 ===
The Suitcase Royale, Banana Bag and Bodice, Kieran Hurley, Kae Tempest, Ockham's Razor, Richard Allen, Jo Bannon, Benji Bower, Lucy Cassidy, Laura Dannequin, Sam Halmarack, Kathy Hinde, Tom Marshman, Sleepdogs, Tom Wainwright, Jeremiah Krage and Heidi Dorschler, Sleepwalk Collective, Jo Hellier, Stand+Stare, Jenna Watt, Andy Field, Tumbling Hat Theatre, Hannah Sullivan, Stephen Voake & Troy Orchard, James Wheale, Chris. Dugrenier, Amy Louise Webber, Carrie Rhys Davies, Il Pixel Rosso, Ridiculusmus, Ontroerend Goed, John Moran, Beady Eye, Berlin Nevada, Ella Good & Nicki Kent, Neon Neon and National Theatre Wales, Hannah Jane Walker and Chris Thorpe, Paper Cinema, Made in China, Chris Goode and Company, SkaGeN, Clod Ensemble, Jane Packman Company, Rik Lander, Belarus Free Theatre, The Beautiful Machine, Bodies in Flight, Heatsick.

=== 2012 ===
Andrew Dawson, Andy Field, Belarus Free Theatre, Bryony Kimmings, Chris Goode and Company, Frauke Requardt, Gary McNair, Jo Bannon, John Moran, Kieran Hurley, Kindle Theatre, Little Bulb Theatre, Mark Bruce Company, Melanie Wilson, Mercurial Wrestler, National Theatre of Scotland, Richard Allen, Stand+Stare, Tania El-Koury, The Other Way Works, Tom Marshman, Wardrobe Theatre

=== 2011 ===
Bryony Kimmings, Dan Canham, Darren Johnston, Debbie Pearson, Dora Garcia, Faulty Optic, Greg McLaren, Guy Dartnell, Jo Bannon, Leo Kay, Little Bulb Theatre, Made in China, NIE, Probe, Prototype Theater, Sam Halmarack, Search Party, Sleepdogs, Stand+Stare, Sylvia Rimat, Will Adamsdale.

=== 2010 ===
Ausform, Beady Eye, Bodies in Flight, Cartoon de Salvo, Curious, Dancing Brick, Edward Rapley, Forest Fringe, Jasmine Loveys, John Moran, Jon Haynes, Kings of England, Little Bulb Theatre, Lone Twin Theatre, Mark Bruce Company, Nic Green, NIE, Ontroerend Goed, Orbita, Peggy Shaw, Requardt & Rosenberg, Stacy Makishi, Sylvia Rimat, The Invisible Circus, The Master Chaynjis, Wattle and Daub, Will Adamsdale.

=== 2009 ===
Adriatic, Inspector Sands, Edward Rapley, Ontroerend Goed, imitating the dog, Skutr, Paper Cinema, John Moran, Cartoon de Salvo, Chris Goode, Stan's Café, Tmesis Theatre, Orbita, Invisible Circus, The Other Way Works, Duncan Speakman.

=== 2008 ===
Action Hero, Al Seed, Augusto Corrieri, BlackSkyWhite, Drunken Chorus, Duncan Speakman, FairGround, Gravity and Levity, Green Eyed Zero, Itta Howie, Kettle of Fish, Lost Spectacles, Mem Morrison, Niki McCretton, Precarious, Ridiculusmus, Rosie Dennis, Rotozaza, Search Party, Stewart Wright/Craig Edwards, Sue Palmer, The Special Guests, Tim Crouch, Tinned Fingers, Tom Marshman.

=== 2007 ===
Al Seed and Ben Faulks, Brenda Waite and Kyra Norman, Company FZ, Gonzo Moose, Inspector Sands & Stamping Ground Theatre, Ivan Marcos, Jackie Kay, Mark Hankins, Peoples in Pieces, Search Party, Soap Soup Theatre, The Special Guests, The TEAM, Tom Marshman, Tom Wainwright.

=== 2006 ===
Al Seed, Big State, Circomedia, Dave Fish Theatre Company, Eva Magyar, Hoipolloi, Jonothan Pram, Laura Dannequin & Dan Canham, Matilda Leyser, Miren Theatre Company, Ockham's Razor Theatre Company, out of inc, Publick Transport, Sketty Productions, Tom Marshman.

=== 2005 ===
Brenda Waite, Dave Fish Theatre Company, Dende Collective, Full Beam Visual Theatre, Julian Fox, The Lucy Show, Paper Birds, Rotozaza, The Special Guests, Sue Lee and Kosta Andreas Theatre Company, Third Angel, Tom Wainwright, Volcano.

=== 2004 ===
Big State Theatre, Rotozaza, Nola Rae, Full Beam Visual Theatre, Oddbodies, Deer Park, Tara Arts, Tom Wainwright, Bodies in Flight, Opera Circus, Cartoon de Salvo, People Show, The Special Guests, The Gogmagogs.

=== 2003 ===
Big State Theatre, Clod Ensemble, Dark Horse, Hoax Productions, Horse+Bamboo, Living Pictures, Marc Von Henning, Miren, People Show, Point Blank, Ridiculusmus, Tim Crouch.
