= Plekzationz =

Studio album by Nick Edwards
- Recorded: March–25 April 2012
- Studio: Dromilly Vale (England); Westerleigh Works (Westerleigh, South Gloucestershire, England); Fountain Square (Buckingham Palace, London, England); The Zone (Birkenhead, England)
- Genre: Ambient; industrial; drone; dub
- Label: Editions Mego
- Producer: Nick Edwards

Plekzationz is a studio album by Nick Edwards, released on the label Editions Mego. Like past Edwards' releases, the ambient industrial drone and dub record was recorded by feeling spiritual, meaning he "drift[ed] off" "concentrating on the moment" during recording but never remembered how the recording went once it ended. However, the making of three of the four tracks on the record was different from the development of his past works, in that fine-tuning of small details of a recording took place afterwards. Reviews of the album were very favorable.

== Production and composition ==
Plekzations was recorded only with very primitive technology such as a cassette tape four-track recorder. As with Nick Edwards' previous works, the recording of Plekzationz was spiritual, which he "drift[ed] off" "concentrating on the moment" during recording but never remembered how a recording was produced once it was finished, feeling as if someone other than Edwards recorded. Plekzationz is an ambient industrial drone and dub album consisting of four "parts." Angus Finlayson of Resident Advisor noted the album to have the same experimentation technique as the works of BBC Radiophonic Workshop and an avant-garde aspect similar to that of dub reggae.

As Tiny Mix Tapes writer Birkut described it, the structure of all of the tracks, despite sounding "intrepid" and "ravenous," involve sounds or parts that are allowed to develop on their own without other sounds disrupting their process, which is "embracing the subconscious that inevitably pulls from various musical styles." Birkut also described the effects that are placed on the sounds as "intoxicating" and "oneiric." As Finlayson described the soundscapes on the record, "Delays shriek across the stereo field, overloading circuits in dense clouds of distortion; synth gestures loom out of the murk with a B-movie sense of melodrama; hypnotic sequences burble menacingly in the background."

== Tracks ==
The making of Plekzationz' first three of its four tracks, "Chance Meets Causality Uptown," "(No) Escape From '79" and "Inside The Analog Continuum," was more intricate than his past releases in that, instead of just converting a whole raw analog recording into a digital stereo track, Edwards also digitally fine-tuned small the parts of what he had recorded. Edwards compared the album's third part, "Inside The Analog Continuum," to the works of dubstep artist Loefah, an artist whose works were heavily focused on the basslines and drums echo-filtered noises in the background. He described the song as a much more noise-present and less bass-heavy version of Loefah's material. The album's closer, "A Pedant's Progress," is its only unedited track, serving as a "antidote" for the digitally-altered previous three tracks. The recording involved a synthesizer that was fed through two effects channels.

== Artwork ==
Plekzationz' front cover art, which is a painted portrait of Edwards, was illustrated by Bristol artist Hollis. Hollis first took a photograph of Edwards in a bathroom at the Cube Microplex. He then spent five days doing a painting of the photograph on a canvas before decorating the painting with Photoshop and Corel Painter. The back cover is a painting of the Bristol Docks also by Hollis; he photographed it first, then design it also with Phiotoshop and Corel Painter. As Edwards recalling about the making of the artwork:

I was having a discussion with Editions Mego about doing this under my own name, rather than Ekoplekz, and at the same time this artist I knew in Bristol got in touch and said “I wanna do your portrait!” he just came out with it. But, when he said that, it just clicked into place — it was obvious that I’ll put the album out under my own name, and use Hollis’ portrait for the sleeve. So I said to him, before he had even done the portrait, so I didn’t even know if I was going to like it, “OK, you can do a portrait of me, no worries, but, I want it for my record sleeve!” So that’s how we went ahead. Luckily, I quite liked it!

== Critical reception ==
Professional ratings
Review scores
Source	Rating
Popmatters	8/10 stars
Resident Advisor	3/5
Tiny Mix Tapes	4.5/5 stars

In writing a review for Freq, Loki wrote, "I’ve played [Plekzationz] four times in three days and for a twitch, attention-spazzed, inarticulate dreamer like me, that’s high praise indeed." An Igloo magazine critic called the album "a rare sonic intensity and a highly welcomed effort in the universe of post-modern electronic art," praising its "completely unique" and "impressive" sound design and "challenging" compositions. Timothy Gabriele of Popmatters called Plekzationz one of Edwards' greatest works, his major praise being the amount of detail brought into the making of each track: "Edwards has absorbed many of his best ideas, laid them flat into a broader more collage-based canvas, and transcended the anxiety of influence that the song titles allude to by making his best qualities sublimate when playing in tandem."

Birkut reviewed Plekzationz under the column "Eureka!" which consisted of reviews for releases "so incredible we just can’t help but exclaim EUREKA!" He described Edwards' use of influences of Plekzationz as "highly unique and [...] clearly emerged from an artist with incredible focus and drive, working judiciously with his rumination and making the most of the export format that the original floating man was deprived of." He concluded his review by writing that "not only is there an underlying theme to Plekzationz that works as a spiritual cleanser gazing inward, but the manner in which these sounds are delivered is utterly thrilling for those on the outside." Finlayson, in a more mixed review, wrote that the album did have "moments of rich strangeness, the kind of intoxicating sonic combinations that invite deep listening." However, he felt that it was "often strangely immobile, lacking in dynamism—and above all ceaselessly monochrome." He overall felt that the album. "for all its potential for brilliance, becomes mired in the self-absorption of a man at play with his machines.
