= Audio Arts =

British sound magazine

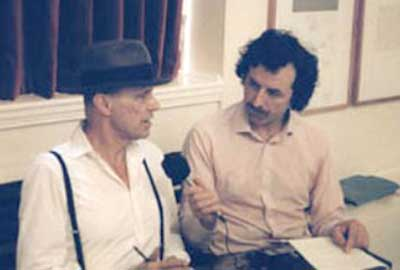
Bill Furlong interviewing Joseph Beuys in 1985

Audio Arts was a British sound magazine published on audio cassettes, documenting contemporary artistic activity via artist or curator interviews, sound performances or sound art by artists.

== History ==
The project was launched in 1973 by Barry Barker and British sculptor William Furlong, born 1944 in Woking, Great Britain. From 1973 to 2006, Audio Arts published 25 volumes of 4 issues of the Audio Arts Cassettes (later releasing LPs and CDs as well). Furlong conducted all interviews until 1996, when Professor Jean Wainwright took the baton as interviewer. Each interview starts with I am here with..., stating artist's name and recording location. Interviewees include: Andy Warhol, Anish Kapoor, Joseph Beuys, Gilbert & George, Yoko Ono, R. Buckminster Fuller, Hermann Nitsch, Mario Merz, Gerhard Richter, Nam June Paik, as well as an interview with W. B. Yeats' daughter and readings by Yeats himself (in Vol.1 Issue #4, 1974).

William Furlong was part of a generation of British artists of the 1960s-70s including Gilbert & George, Richard Hamilton, Bruce McLean or Paul Richards (whose Nice Style performance group was the first pose band) who were consciously moving from traditional art forms to conceptual art, performance, new media, cheap materials, in a dematerialized and process-oriented ethos. Furlong is now a sound artist with sound installations exhibited in Lisbon (Walls of Sound, 1998), Bexhill on Sea, Sussex (Anthem, 2009), Genillard Gallery, London (Possibility & Impossibility of Fixing Meaning, 2009).

With the acquisition of the Audio Arts archive by Tate in 2004 (itself a long-time subscriber to Audio Arts cassettes releases), over 200 boxes of master tapes used to edit the magazine are now secured for future researchers. A selection was exhibited at Tate Britain March–August 2007. The archive is now catalogued, digitized and preserved there.

In October–December 2006, a retrospective exhibition curated by Lucia Farinati took place at Rome’s Sound Art Museum showing a selection of Audio Arts releases and adding a new sound art by Furlong: Conversation Pieces, a reworking/remixing of preview Furlong interviews, making famous interviewees respond to each other by the magic of cut-up. See SlashSeconds.org.

William Furlong's Audio Arts project was featured in the See This Sound (Promises in Sound and Vision) exhibition, curated by Cosima Rainer, August 28, 2009 to January 10, 2010, Lentos Kunstmuseum, Linz, Austria.

== Sources ==
- Audio Arts digitised and published on the Tate website
- Bill Furlong Audio Arts: Discourse & Practice in Contemporary Art, published by Academy Editions, London, 1994.
- Overview and index of the Audio Arts releases
- Bill Furlong interview
- Bill Furlong biography
