= Joe Volk =

English musician and songwriter

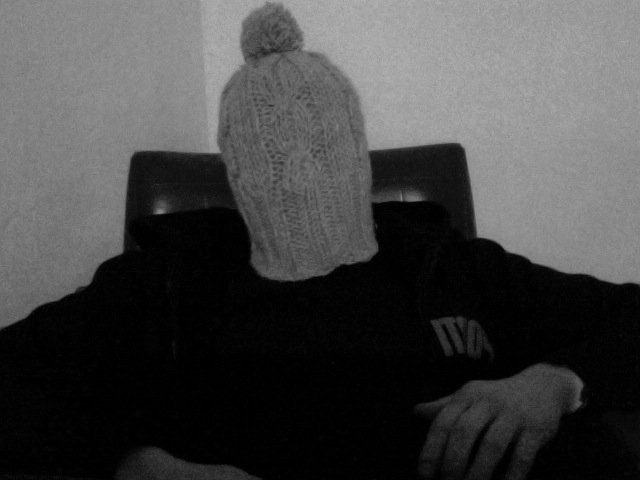
- Joe Volk in Helsinki, Finland. February 2011

Background information
- Origin: United Kingdom
- Genres: Acoustic, Folk.
- Years active: 2002–present
- Labels: Invada, Glitterhouse
- Formerly of: Crippled Black Phoenix, Gonga
- Website: www.joevolk.co.uk

Joe Volk is an English musician and songwriter from Bristol now based in Bern, Switzerland. He was lyricist and singer with the bands Gonga and Crippled Black Phoenix, and is a solo recording artist.

== Solo ==
As a solo artist, Volk was first signed to Invada Records and released his debut album Derwent Waters Saint in 2006. The album was recorded, engineered and produced by Adrian Utley, guitarist with the band Portishead. In December 2012, Volk released a split 12" EP on Invada Records with the experimental Japanese band Boris.

In 2015, Volk signed to Glitterhouse Records and released his second solo album Happenings and Killings in February 2016. The album was produced by Volk, with additional production and orchestration by Emmy-nominated composer Ben Salisbury along with Geoff Barrow. To support Happenings and Killings, Volk toured Germany in early 2017 with a new live band he formed with drummer Thys Bucher and bassist Jürg Schmidhauser. Together the three musicians wrote new material for his third album Primitive Energetics, released in April 2020 under the name Joe Volk + Naiare.

== Bands ==
He was first signed to Invada Records in 2003 as the singer with extreme hard rock band Gonga. Volk left the band in 2007 after writing and releasing two albums. Volk was the original singer and lyricist in Crippled Black Phoenix, a band founded by Justin Greaves in 2004. He left the band in 2012 after releasing five studio albums, one live album and one EP with the band.

== Discography ==
=== Albums ===
Year	Album details
2006	Derwent Waters Saint: Released: 13 February 2006; Label: Invada; Format: CD
2016	Happenings and Killings: Released: 19 February 2016; Label: Glitterhouse Records; Format: CD, vinyl, digital
2020	Primitive Energetics: Released: 24 April 2020; Label: Glitterhouse Records; Format: CD, vinyl, digital

=== Extended plays ===
Year	Album details
2012	Boris / Joe Volk Split: Released: 10 December 2012; Label: Invada; Format: Digital, vinyl

=== Official videos ===
- "Call to Sun" (2012)
- "Soliloquy" (2015)
- "These Feathers Count" (2016)
- "Whitesheet" (2020)

=== With Gonga ===
- Gonga (2003)
- II: Transmigration (2008)

=== With Crippled Black Phoenix ===
- Sharks & Storms / Blizzard of Horned Cats (2006)
- A Love of Shared Disasters (2007)
- The Resurrectionists (2009)
- Night Raider (2009)
- I, Vigilante (2010)
- (Mankind) The Crafty Ape (2012)
- Poznan 2011 A.D. (2012)

== Other ==
Volk is the great-grandson of electrical engineer and inventor Magnus Volk.

== See also ==
- List of bands from Bristol
- Culture of Bristol
