= Jean Wainwright =

British professor

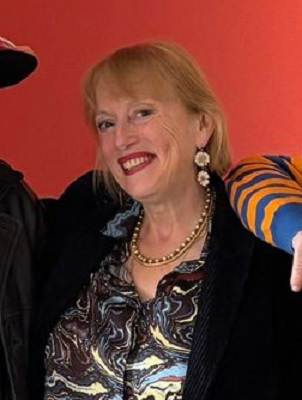
Wainwright in Stockholm in 2024

Jean Barbara Wainwright (born in June 1954) is a British professor and curator in London. As an art historian and critic she has specialized and exhibited her expertise regarding Andy Warhol's life and work. Her method features interviews with artists, photographers, filmmakers and curators known internationally. Wainwright ’s archives contain over 1,000 interviews of which many have been published in numerous catalogues and books. She had contributed such work to the Tate Gallery's archives with over 170 interviews also available on the Internet. With special interest in art-world connectivity, her many interviews done for Audio Arts have created a twenty-year profile of art at large. Knowledge of the art world has expanded considerably, academically, through her archive beginning in the 1960s, since then developing into her roles in teaching, supervision and as a consultant.

Wainwright has published considerably and contributed to many catalogues and books. She also regularly appears on television and radio, most notably on Channel 4, the BBC, Open University, Resonance FM and BBC Radio 4's Today programme. The lists of her artist interviews and titles are extensive.

Wainwright's doctorate was on Warhol's audio tapes. She has become a senior lecturer at UCA Rochester and as an art critic often works with Art Newspaper TV. While she did exhibitions with Tracey Emin, the frequency of Warhol mentions awakened Wainwright's interest in Warhol's films, looking at their relationship to young British artists. In New York and Pittsburgh she got involved with the family and a grant came through for her for work on a PhD involving sound, so she zeroed in on Warrhol's tapes. Her job is to lead a department of cultural studies and clear the way for students to contextualise their work in photography. She is very fond of teaching and speaking and closeness to creative processes.

Jean Wainwright is Director of the Fine Art and the Photography Research Centre at UCA. She has focused on photography and the emergence of new themes and processes, including contemporary and political work by Dagmar van Weeghel, Bettina von Zwehl, Emily Allchurch, Julia Fullerton-Batten and contrasting Karine Laval as well as Michele Cirillo.

Wainwright's Audio Arts Archive begun in 1996 continues to grow and she went online at the Tate in 2014. Her international exhibitions include My Search for Andy Warhol’s Voice 2011–2012, Ship to Shore: Art and the Lure of the Sea 2014, Gestures of Resistance 2017, Powerful Tides, 400 Years of Chatham and the Sea 2018, Another Spring 2018 and Documents from the Edges of Conflict 2021–2022. She covers major art fairs and events interviewing artists. Her contributions have included corporate projects such as Crossrail, The Eden Project, Heathrow Terminal 2 (Slipstream), Ebbsfleet Valley and BT Connected World for FutureCity and FuturePace. Events she has covered include Frieze (London), Art Basel in Miami and Basel, the Venice Biennale and The Armory (New York).
