= Jon Thompson (artist) =

Jon Thompson (1936 – February 2016) was an artist, curator and academic known for his involvement in the development of the YBA artist generation.

As the Head of Goldsmiths Department of Art in the 1980s, Thompson opened up specialisms and allowed students to move freely between the different modes of practice, such as painting, sculpture, photography and printing, etc. His own art moved from painting to a conceptual photography and sculpture, but after his retirement from teaching Thompson concentrated on a kind of abstract painting. This separated Goldsmiths from the dominance of art schools like St Martins. In 1988 he was involved in the curation of the now legendary Freeze warehouse exhibition along with various art students and Damien Hirst whom Thompson had accepted on to the course and tutored since that time. Jon Thompson was head of the MA Fine Art course at Middlesex University's School of Art (previously Hornsey College of Art) and lectured on artists such as Marcel Duchamp and Piero Manzoni. He has also curated shows at the Hayward Gallery in London including Gravity and Grace and Falls the Shadow with Barry Barker.

2011 saw the publication of The Collected Writings of Jon Thompson by Ridinghouse, which brought together the collected writings of the British artist, writer and professor.

In late 2018 there was a solo exhibition of Thompson's work at Sotheby's S|2 gallery, accompanied by a catalogue with an essay by Michael Bracewell.
