= Hearts of Black Science =

Swedish electronic duo

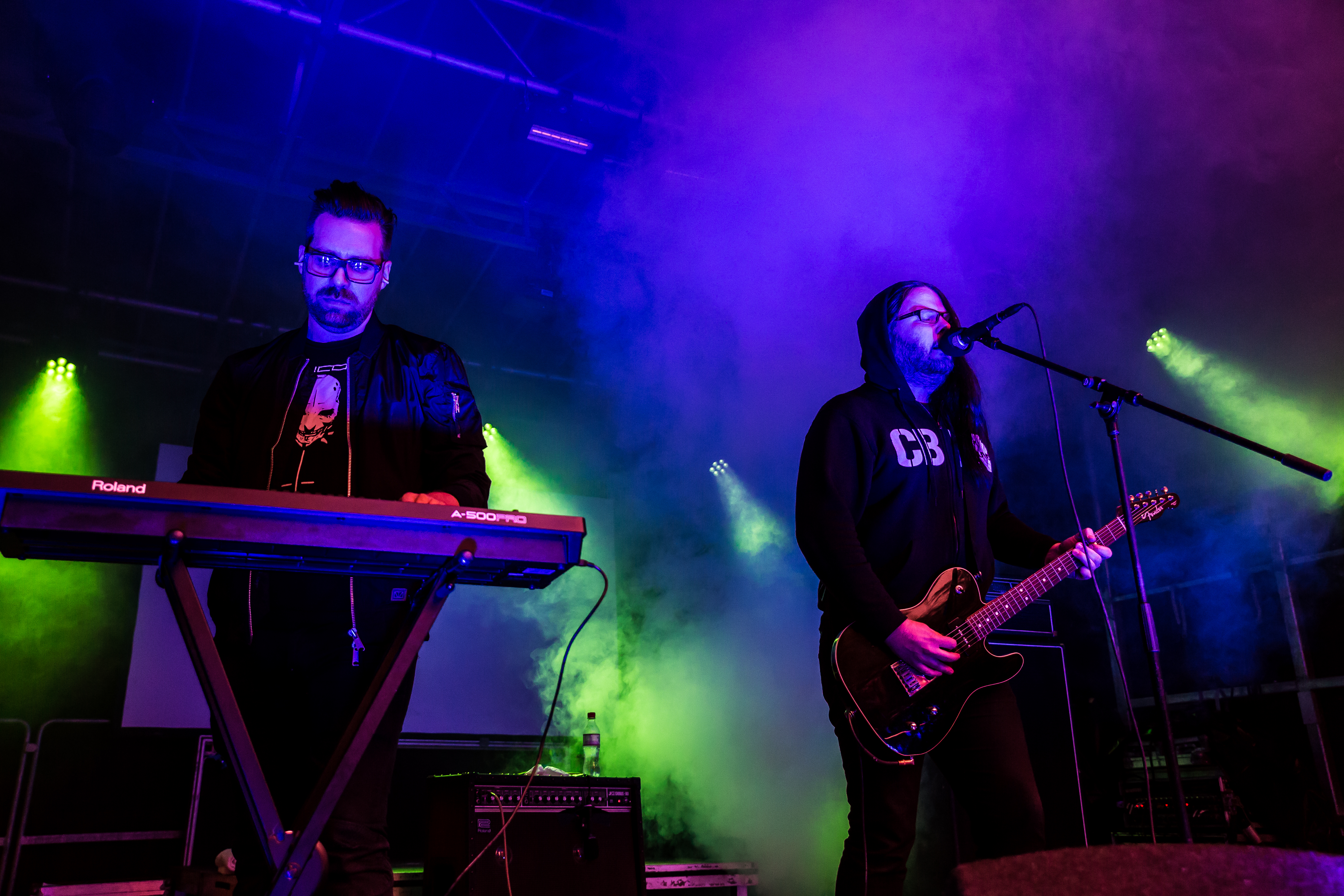
- Hearts Of Black Science Nocturnal Culture Night (2017)

Background information
- Origin: Gothenburg, Sweden
- Genres: synthpop, shoegaze, new wave, post-rock, electronica
- Years active: 2005−present
- Labels: Club AC30; Wonderland Records; Progress Productions
- Members: Daniel Änghede; Tomas Almgren

Hearts of Black Science is a Swedish musical duo from Gothenburg, known for creating “dark, brooding synthpop mixed with shoegaze, goth and new wave pop”. The genre of their music has also been referred to as post-rock and electronica. The band says their focus is on "melodies" and "dark lyrics"; their name comes from the idea of alchemy creating gold from available materials, or in their case, music from diverse styles.

== History ==
Hearts of Black Science was formed in November 2005 by two childhood friends: Daniel Änghede (also vocalist in UK supergroup Crippled Black Phoenix) and Tomas Almgren (ex-horror movie director). In April 2006, the band released a self-financed EP with a limited run of 200 copies that sold out within just 2 months; a second EP was released the following month.

The band was signed shortly after the A&R scout from Club AC30 saw them performing their second gig ever at the Water Rats Theatre in London. The debut album The Ghost You Left Behind was released by the London-based label in the spring of 2007. It was also released in Japan as a special edition by Quince Records. The full-length album was accompanied by two singles: Empty City Lights and Driverlights. Änghede left the band for a period while Almgren continued writing; he created the demos that together they made into their next album, The Star In The Lake, released on Swedish label Wonderland Records in 2009.

Hearts of Black Science have toured in the U.K.; BBC radio invited the duo twice to perform live on air on the Gideon Coe and Tom Robinson shows. Their first two albums have been praised by both international press and their fans: Sweden's Zero Music Magazine gave the debut 9 / 10 and the follow-up 8 / 10; U.S.-based Virus Magazine gave it 8 / 10.

In 2013, the band released an EP named We Saw the Moon and also a digital album called B-Sides & Remixes collecting their B-sides and hard to find remixes along with several unreleased tracks.

After several delays, the band released their third full-length album, Signal, on 20 November 2015 through Swedish label Progress Productions. The new album includes guest appearances by Chrysta Bell, Justin Greaves (of Crippled Black Phoenix), and Heike Langhans (of Draconian).

== Band members ==
- Daniel Änghede - vocals, guitars, bass
- Tomas Almgren - keyboards, programming, beats

== Discography ==
=== Albums ===
- The Ghost You Left Behind (2007, released through Club AC30)
- The Star In the Lake (2009, released through Wonderland Records)
- B-Sides & Remixes (2013, self-released)
- Signal (2015, through Progress Productions)

=== EPs ===
- The Black EP (2006, self-released)
- The White EP (2006, self-released)
- We Saw the Moon (2013, self-released)

=== Singles ===
- Empty City Lights (2007, released through Club AC30)
- Driverlights (2007, released through Club AC30)
- Gold & Dust (2009, released through Wonderland Records)
