= Shobana Jeyasingh =

Indian-born British choreographer

Shobana Jeyasingh CBE (born 26 March 1957 in Chennai) is a British choreographer and founder of Shobana Jeyasingh Dance.

Shobana Jeyasingh has been creating dance works for 30 years. Born in Chennai, India, she currently lives and works in London. Her highly individual work has been witnessed in all kinds of venues, including theatres, outdoor and indoor sites and on film. Her work taps into both the intellectual and physical power of dance, and is rooted in her particular vision of culture and society.

Shobana's work is often enriched by specially commissioned music composed by an array of contemporary composers — from Michael Nyman to beat-boxer Shlomo. Her collaborators have included filmmakers, mathematicians, digital designers, writers, animators, as well as lighting and set designers.

Shobana has also contributed to dance in the UK and internationally through her published writings, papers, panel presentations and broadcast interviews.

== Work and awards ==
Jeyasingh has produced more than 50 dance works.

She states that her work is rooted in her experiences as a British Asian and explores the conflicts between diverse personal and cultural origins. Her choreography draws upon various sources, including Ballet, Bharatnatyam and contemporary dance.

Jeyasingh was appointed Member of the Order of the British Empire (MBE) in 1995 and Commander of the Order of the British Empire (CBE) in the 2020 New Year Honours, both for services to dance.

She holds honorary MAs from the University of Chichester and Surrey University, an honorary doctorate from De Montfort University, and is a research associate at Middlesex University's Research Centre for the Performing arts. In 2005 Jeyasingh was the recipient of a NESTA Dream Time Fellowship. In 2008 she was named Asian Woman of Achievement for her contribution to Britain's cultural life.

Complete list of works

| 2022 | Clorinda Agonistes (Clorinda the Warrior) | Commissioned by Sadler's Wells and supported by PRS Foundation for Music |
| 2019 | Staging Schiele | Commissioned by Southbank Centre and supported by DanceEast |
| 2018 | Contagion | Commissioned by 14-18 NOW and supported by Wellcome Trust (restaged 2020) |
| 2017 | Bayadère – The Ninth Life | Re-staging at Sadler's Wells, London |
| 2017 | Material Men redux | (restaged 2020) |
| 2016 | études | |
| 2016 | Outlander | Commissioned by the Fondazione Giorgio Cini and a special event for Venice Biennale Danza 2016 |
| 2015 | Material Men | Commissioned by Southbank Centre |
| 2015 | Trespass R&D | Collaboration with academics from the Department of Informatics, Faculty of Natural & Mathematical Sciences at King’s College London and The Bartlett School of Architecture, UCL |
| 2015 | Bayadère – The Ninth Life | Commissioned by The Royal Ballet Studio Programme |
| 2014 | In Flagrante | Commissioned by Artakt, University of the Arts London |
| 2013 | Translocations | Part of the Knowledge Producers programme, Cultural Institute at King’s |
| 2013 | Strange Blooms | Commissioned by Southbank Centre |
| 2012 | TooMortal | Dance Umbrella, Venice Biennale, Dansens Hus Stockholm, BITEF Belgrade, London 2012 Festival |
| 2012 | Configurations | Part of Classic Cut Double Bill |
| 2012 | Dev Kahan Hai? / Where is Dev? | Part of Classic Cut Double Bill |
| 2010 | Counterpoint | Somerset House and English National Ballet for Big Dance 2010, Broadcast in 3D by Sky Arts |
| 2010 | Bruise Blood | |
| 2009 | Just Add Water? | City of London Festival for Steps of St Paul’s Cathedral |
| 2008 | 2Step | |
| 2007 | Faultline | |
| 2007 | The Dancer’s Cut | |
| 2007 | Exit No Exit | |
| 2005 | Transtep 2 | |
| 2005 | Flicker | |
| 2004 | Transtep | Including choreography by Lisa Torun, Filip Van Huffel and Rashpal Singh Bansal |
| 2004 | 4Squares | Mayor of London for Diwali in London in Trafalgar Square |
| 2004 | Foliage Chorus | ArtsDepot, London |
| 2003 | Café Event | Waterman’s Arts Centre |
| 2003 | Curve Chameleon | Greater London Assembly |
| 2002 | [h]Interland | |
| 2002 | Phantasmaton | |
| 2001 | Web | |
| 2000 | Surface Tension | |
| 1999 | Fine Frenzy | |
| 1999 | Memory and Other Props | |
| 1998 | Intertense | Choreographed by Wayne McGregor |
| 1998 | Intimacies of the Third Order | |
| 1997 | Astral Shadows | Choreographed by Laurie Booth |
| 1996 | Palimpsest | |
| 1996 | The Bird and the Wind | |
| 1995 | Raid | Broadcast by BBC |
| 1993 | Delicious Arbour | Choreographed by Richard Alston |
| 1993 | Duets with Automobiles | Commissioned by Arts Council England and BBC |
| 1993 | Romance... with Footnotes | |
| 1992 | Making of Maps | |
| 1991 | Speaking of Sakti | Part of New Cities Ancient Lands Triple Bill Choreographed by Chandralekha |
| 1991 | Late | Part of New Cities Ancient Lands Triple Bill |
| 1991 | Byzantium | Part of New Cities Ancient Lands Triple Bill |
| 1990 | Correspondences | |
| 1989 | Defilé | |
| 1988 | Configurations | |
Commissions
| 2017 | Here | Company of Elders |
| 2014 | Terra Incognita | Rambert |
| 2009 | Detritus | Beijing Dance Academy |
| 2008 | Breach | Ballet Black |
| 2006 | City:zen | Hong Kong co-choreography with Mui Cheuk-yin |
| 2005 | Pop Idle | Ricochet Dance Company Move Me Dance Booth |
| 2004 | Debris | Anurekha Ghosh Dance Company |
| 2003 | Triptych Self | Canasia Dance Festival, Canada |
| 2003 | Neon Dream | Sonia Sabri Dance Company |
| 2003 | Polar Sequences | Random Dance Company |
| 2002 | Curve Twist Gaze | Sonia Sabri Dance Company |
University & College Commissions
| 2016 | Dance Beneath | MapDance, University of Chichester |
| 2009 | Re:Mix | Laban CAT |
| 2008 | Body Talk | MapDance, University of Chichester |
| 2007 | Sibuya | London Studio Centre |
| 2007 | Taxon | Middlesex University |
| 2006 | Counterfeit | Northern Contemporary Dance School |
| 2005 | Skin Deep | London Contemporary Dance School |
