= Joan Dickinson =

American artist, writer, director, curator and educator

Joan Dickinson is a contemporary American artist, writer, director, curator, and educator. Her creative practice combines visual and performance art, photography, writing, farming and environmental restoration, astrology, ceremony, and palliative care. Dickinson holds a master's in performance from Columbia College and a doctorate (2012) from the Literary Arts program at the University of Denver.

== History ==
=== Early Work ===
Dickinson along with others (Iris Moore, Lawrence Steger, Matthew Owens, to name just a few) was part of an experimental arts scene that flourished in Chicago during the 1990s through the early 2000s taking place, primarily, in night clubs (performances included Hula, Black Cake, Big Goddess Powwow, Mental Beauty/Enduring Affection). Locations included Club Lower Links, Lounge Ax, Cabaret Metro; experimental performance venues such as Links Hall and Hot House; and alternative, non-profit galleries including Randolph Street Gallery, and N.A.M.E.

Around this time, Dickinson also worked as a production artist and graphic designer on such varied projects as Biosphere 2 in Oracle, Arizona and two of Peter Sellars' operas, Tannhäuser and The Death of Klinghoffer.

=== Site-specific, Land, and Place-based Work ===
For a twelve-year period, Joan lived on a 300-acre wetland sanctuary in rural McHenry County, Illinois, where she created a series of eight immersive, dense, and ambitious works including Hunter’s Moon, Flower, The Architecture of Honey, Drove Road, and Devotion each based in the surrounding landscape(s). Many of these works took place over the period of a year and culminated in an event in which performers, actors, musicians, installations, objects, movements and actions, and texts converged. Documentation and writing from several of these projects are featured in an extensive photo-essay in TDR.

In roughly the same time period and continuing into the present day, other work has been presented in various contemporary art spaces and theaters including: Institute of Contemporary Arts in London, 3rd Eye Center & Center for Contemporary Arts in Glasgow, PS 122 in New York City, Highways Performance Space in Santa Monica, Illinois State Museum in Springfield, and many locations in Chicago including the Lyric Opera, the Chicago Cultural Center, Hyde Park Art Center, Randolph Street Gallery, the Lurie Garden at Millennium Park, and the Museum of Contemporary Art. Other venues include Experimental Sound Studio, Club Lower Links, Cabaret Metro, and, in Platte Forum (Denver), Counterpath Press, and Common Name Farm.

=== With Goat Island ===
Dickinson's multifaceted practice includes a collaboration with Goat Island between 1988 and 1990, additionally contributing to the 2019 retrospective at the Chicago Cultural Center: goat island archive – we have discovered the performance by making it.

=== With Randolph Street Gallery ===
Beginning in 1989 and continuing until early 1997, Dickinson worked at Randolph Street Gallery (RSG), the erstwhile alternative arts space in Chicago (1979–1998). Initially, Dickinson was a member of the committee responsible for performance programming, and then from 1993 and until her resignation, Dickinson directed all live events working in both curatorial and production capacities. Of the fifty or more artists and writers produced by RSG during these years, many went on to national and international recognition including Quraysh Ali Lasana, Nancy Andrews, Ron Athey, Sadie Benning, Jaap Blonk, Lynn Book, Mwata Bowden, Janet Cardiff, William Close, Richard Elovich, Coco Fusco, Goat Island, Essex Hemphill, In the Flesh (Series), John Malpede, Eileen Myles, Natsu Nakajima, Achy Obejas, Matthew Owens, Guillermo Gomez Pena, Pomo Afro Homos, Marlon Riggs, Root Wy’mn Theater Company, Sacred Naked Nature Girls Carolee Schneeman, Laetitia Sonami, Patricia Smith, Spiderwoman Theater, Lawrence Steger, That Time of the Months (Series), Rose Troche.

== Selected Work ==
- The Nocturnal Farmer's Almanac for Common Name Farm (2022 - ongoing)
- Goat Island Retrospective/Exhibition + Performances + Symposium (2019)
- The Cooking School of the Air (2012–2019)
- Coming in from the North (2007–2016)
- The Dream of the Owl Sisters (performance + book; 2013–2015)
- "Mule Deer Are Everywhere in the West" from A Poetic Inventory of Rocky Mountain National Park (2012)
- "Lindow Man" from Fat Boy Review (2011)
- With All that She Is She Desires to Give Great Pleasure (2007–2009)
- Degrees of Wildness/The Charioteer (2006)
- The Language of Birds (2005)
- Atmosphere (2005)
- In the Palace of the Night Heron (2004)as part of Bird Brain with Jennifer Monson
- Devotion (2001–2002)
- Drove Road (1999–2000)
- The Architecture of Honey (1997–1998)
- Flower (1996–1997)
- Hunter’s Moon (1995–1996)
- Hula (1994)
- Big Goddess Powwow (1994–1996)
- Black Cake (1993)
- White Castle (1993)
- Mental Beauty/Enduring Affection (1992)
- We Got A Date (1989); Can’t Take Johnny to the Funeral (1991) as part of Goat island Performance Group
