= Claire Doherty =

British creative director, writer and arts producer

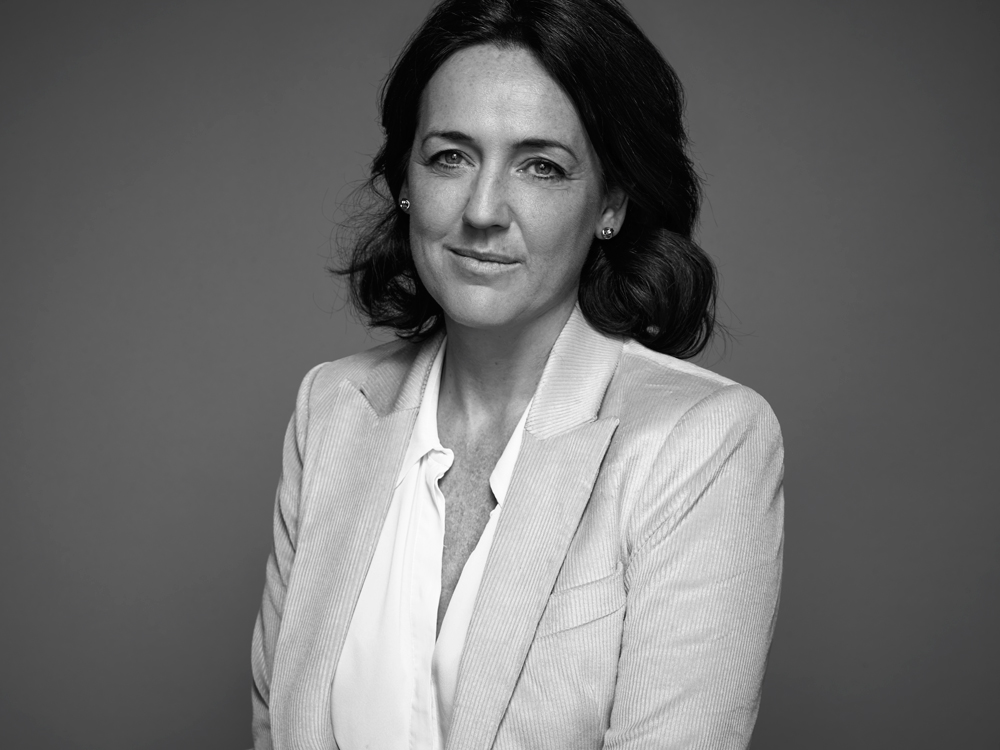
Claire Doherty in 2018

Claire Doherty MBE is a writer, creative director and arts producer known for her producing and writing on place and the arts.

== Career ==
Doherty was curator of Ikon Gallery in Birmingham and FACT in Liverpool before becoming the founder director in 2002 of Situations, Bristol-based international arts commissioning and producing organisation. Situations' projects over a 15-year period included Theaster Gates' first UK public project Sanctum in Bristol; Philip Hoare's The Tale, a multi-site, cross-artform site-specific project in Torbay; and One Day Sculpture across five cities in New Zealand.

She was Director of Arnolfini, centre for contemporary arts, in Bristol, England, from 2017–19. Doherty led the organisation through an 18-month transition following the loss of its Arts Council England National Portfolio Organisation (NPO) status, which occurred before Doherty's arrival in 2017. The transformation included Arnolfini's most successful exhibition until then – Grayson Perry's The Most Popular Art Exhibition Ever! – and the Imagine New Rules campaign to reimagine a 21st-century arts organisation. Doherty's cross-artform programme at Arnolfini during the transition period included: Eclipse Theatre's Black Men Walking, In Between Time's We are Warriors, Black Girl Convention, Don't Tell Your Mother and Creative Youth Network. Doherty also oversaw the establishment of Now or Never, youth-led creative studio and two Inspiring Women in the Arts mentoring events in Bristol.

Doherty was a Trustee of Artes Mundi, Cardiff, the international biennial art exhibition and prize.

In 2020 Doherty became Creative Director and Executive Producer of GALWAD, a multi-platform story told in real-time, created in partnership with National Theatre Wales, Ffilm Cymru Wales, Frân Wen and Clwstwr. The project was nominated for the Rose d'Or and SXSW Innovation Awards.

In 2024 she founded House Dog, a production company developing work across screen, performance and site-responsive storytelling.

== Recognition ==
In 2009, Doherty was awarded a Paul Hamlyn Foundation Breakthrough Award for Outstanding Cultural Entrepreneurs.

In 2015 Doherty was appointed MBE 'For services to the Arts in South West England'.

In 2018 the Bristol Post included her in its list of "The 100 most influential women in the West [of England]".

== Selected publications ==
- Doherty, Claire (2015). Out of Time, Out of Place: Public Art Now. London: Art/Books. ISBN 9781908970176.
- Doherty, Claire (2004). Contemporary Art: From Studio to Situation. London: Black Dog Publishing Ltd. ISBN 1904772064.
- Doherty, Claire (2009). Situation. London: Whitechapel Gallery. ISBN 978-0854881734.
