= Media in Bristol =

Bristol is a city in South West England.

== Radio ==
Bristol is homed to a number of local radio stations, the main being BBC Radio Bristol which is part of the BBC Local Radio network broadcasting on FM, an AM version did exist until it closed in 2016. Commercial stations include Heart (previously known as GWR and Radio West), Smooth (DAB), Kiss 101 (FM), Greatest Hits Radio Bristol & The South West (FM) and Hits Radio Bristol & The South West, which replaced Sam FM (Bristol) in December 2009. and Wire Radio, broadcasts online. Three community stations have been launched in the 21st century:BCfm, Ujima Radio, and Bradley Stoke Radio, as well as two student radio stations, Hub Radio (University of the West of England) and Burst Radio (University of Bristol).

Urban radio projects such as the 1980s pirate, Savage Yet Tender and Dialect Radio (ceased October 2004) have proved to be more short-lived. However, in February 2007, a unique online station, Radio Salaam Shalom was launched by a combined team of Muslim and Jewish volunteers allowing the two cultures to talk together and share their experiences.

In 2015 Bristol was chosen as a site for a small scale DAB trial, this trial has been successful and Ofcom plans to officially license a local DAB operator in 2020. It has allowed a number of small local and community radio stations to broadcast on DAB, and has even allowed some new stations to start up including Noods Radio.

== Print media ==
Bristol is the home of the regional morning newspaper, the Western Daily Press, local paper the Bristol Post (and its Friday supplement Bristol Post Weekend, which covers events listings in the city), and The Bristol Cable which specialises in investigative journalism with a quarterly print edition and website. A Bristol edition of Metro is distributed for free on buses and on the streets. The now-defunct local listings magazine, Venue, covered the city's live music, theatre and arts scenes. It survived a threat of closure in 2011, and is now published as a free monthly (jointly with lifestyle magazine Folio).

Smile Census (%)
Bristol	70
Glasgow	68
Exeter	54
Manchester	54
Wrexham	42
Cardiff	41
Liverpool	41
Norwich	35
Newcastle	32
Birmingham	31
Southampton	24
London	18
Edinburgh	4
Nottingham	0

In 2003 several local publications reported Bristol the "smiling capital of Britain" due to a study being conducted by the BBC before Red Nose Day on 14 March. Psychology students from universities in the cities surveyed, found that 70 out of every 100 Bristolians returned a smile from Comic Relief researchers. This put Bristol first in their "smiles per hour" census, the table makes interesting reading with Londoners only returning a smile 18% of the time. Bristol comedian Tony Robinson said: "We do smile a lot in the city, but sometimes it is not really a smile - we are just a little bit constipated."

Bristol has a flourishing independent media scene, including The Bristolian, Bristle magazine and a local Indymedia website. The Spark is a magazine that was established in 1993 and is published quarterly. It covers the surging interest in all things green, ethical and complementary.

The Bristolian news sheet achieved a regular distribution of several thousand, pulling no punches with its satirical exposés of council and corporate corruption. The Bristolian, 'Smiter of the High and Mighty', even spawned a radical independent political party that polled an impressive 15% in Easton ward in 2003. In October 2005 it came runner up for the national Paul Foot Award for investigative journalism

The anarchist-oriented Bristle, a magazine with the strap line 'fighting talk for Bristol and the South-West', was started in 1997 and celebrated its twentieth issue in 2005. Its pages especially feature subvertising and other urban street art to complement news, views and comments on the local activist scene as well as tackling issues such as drugs, mental health and housing.

1970s women's liberation Feminist movement paper Enough, was succeeded in the 1990s by the environmental and pagan Greenleaf (edited by George Firsoff), West Country Activist, Kebelian Voice, Planet Easton, the anarcho-feminist Bellow and present-day punk fanzine Everlong, all of which have been published in Bristol.

The Bristol Indymedia website, like the wider Indymedia network, provides a mix of news and articles that often tend towards a left-wing, progressive or anarchistic perspective. Bristol Indymedia volunteers have also produced films and run community media days (often at the Cube Microplex).

== Local broadcasters ==
Bristol is in the ITV West and BBC West television regions.

== Film and television production ==
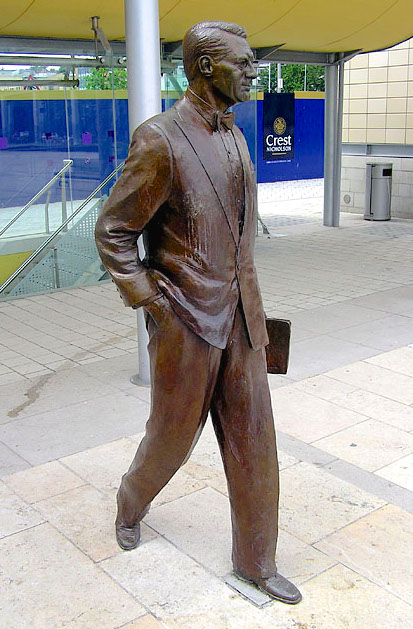
Statue of Cary Grant in Millennium Square, Bristol, England.

Aardman Animations films Wallace & Gromit, Chicken Run, Creature Comforts and Robbie the Reindeer were all produced in Bristol, with premises in St Phillips Marsh. In 2006, a fire destroyed many of the sets from past productions.

Broadcasting House in Clifton is the headquarters of BBC West and the BBC Natural History Unit (NHU). Natural history TV programmes produced in Bristol include Life on Earth, The Living Planet, The Trials of Life, Life in the Freezer, The Private Life of Plants, The Life of Birds and The Life of Mammals. The NHU also produced Animal Magic, many episodes of which were filmed at Bristol Zoo.

Television programmes filmed in Bristol include BBC drama Being Human, Channel 4 comedy-dramas Teachers and Skins and the ITV series Afterlife, a number of which used local actors and residents as extras. Several games shows also film in the city, including BrainTeaser and Deal or No Deal. Other prolific series to be filmed here include Shoestring (1970s), Robin of Sherwood (1980s) and The House of Eliott (1990s). The sitcom Only Fools and Horses was filmed in Bristol, despite being set in London as was The Young Ones. The hospital drama Casualty was filmed in Bristol until it moved to Cardiff in 2012.

In film, Bristol has been the location for:

- The Truth About Love 2007
- Radio On 1979
- Starter for 10 2006
- These Foolish Things 2004
- Paper Mask 1990
- Truly, Madly, Deeply 1990
- The Titfield Thunderbolt 1953

Bristol is the birthplace of the actor Cary Grant. In 2001 a statue was erected in his honour in Millennium Square (Bristol) next to At-Bristol in Canons Marsh.

In 1971, the BBC made The Bristol Entertainment, a television film giving a humorous account of the history of Bristol from over the past 1000 years all the way to the modern time. The film started Brian Blessed, Bernard Holley, Phyllida Law, Angharad Rees, Peter Sallis, Eric Thompson and Brian Wilde.
