= Dick Penny =

British arts administrator and consultant

Dick Penny MBE
- Born: Droitwich Spa, Worcestershire, England
- Occupation: arts administrator
- Known for: contributions to the arts in Bristol

Richard William Penny MBE is an arts administrator, consultant and producer, based in Bristol, England. Before his involvement in the arts, he worked in manufacturing industry, computer programming and the building trade.

== Biography ==
Penny was born in Droitwich Spa and educated at Monmouth School and Ross-on-Wye Grammar School. His first job in the theatre was as administrator of the Little Theatre Company (1980–1983), which he set up with a group of Bristol Old Vic actors to keep the Little Theatre, in the municipally owned Colston Hall complex, going as a professional venue. His duties included everything from set building to front of house. Notable productions included Raymond Briggs' 1983 adaptation of his own book When the Wind Blows, based on the UK Government civil defence booklet Protect and Survive, which transferred to the Whitehall Theatre.

Between 1986 and 1988 Penny was the Associate Director at Bristol Old Vic with a brief to develop programme and audience. From 1991 to 1993 he was director of Watershed Media Centre, the UK's first media centre. He has been a board member of the Ashton Court Festival, Circomedia and Bristol +. Penny has stated that he has "a passion for Bristol and a drive to make the city a more exciting, open and inter-connected place to live, work and play."

In the 1990s Penny's production company Rebbeck Penny co-produced Macbeth, starring Pete Postlethwaite, with Bristol Old Vic for a UK tour, and in 2001 Scaramouche Jones, which also starred Postlethwaite, for a UK and world tour. In 2007 he took over as Executive Chair of Bristol Old Vic with the main objective of reopening England's longest running theatre. He is currently the managing director of the Watershed Media Centre, an organisation he re-joined in 1998.

Penny is also founding director of Bristol +, a creative partnership board made up of public sector officials and creative entrepreneurs. In 2010 he was awarded honorary degrees by the University of Bristol and the University of the West of England. He was appointed a Member of the Most Excellent Order of the British Empire (MBE) for services to the creative industries in Bristol in the 2011 New Year Honours.
