= Crippled Black Phoenix =

English rock band

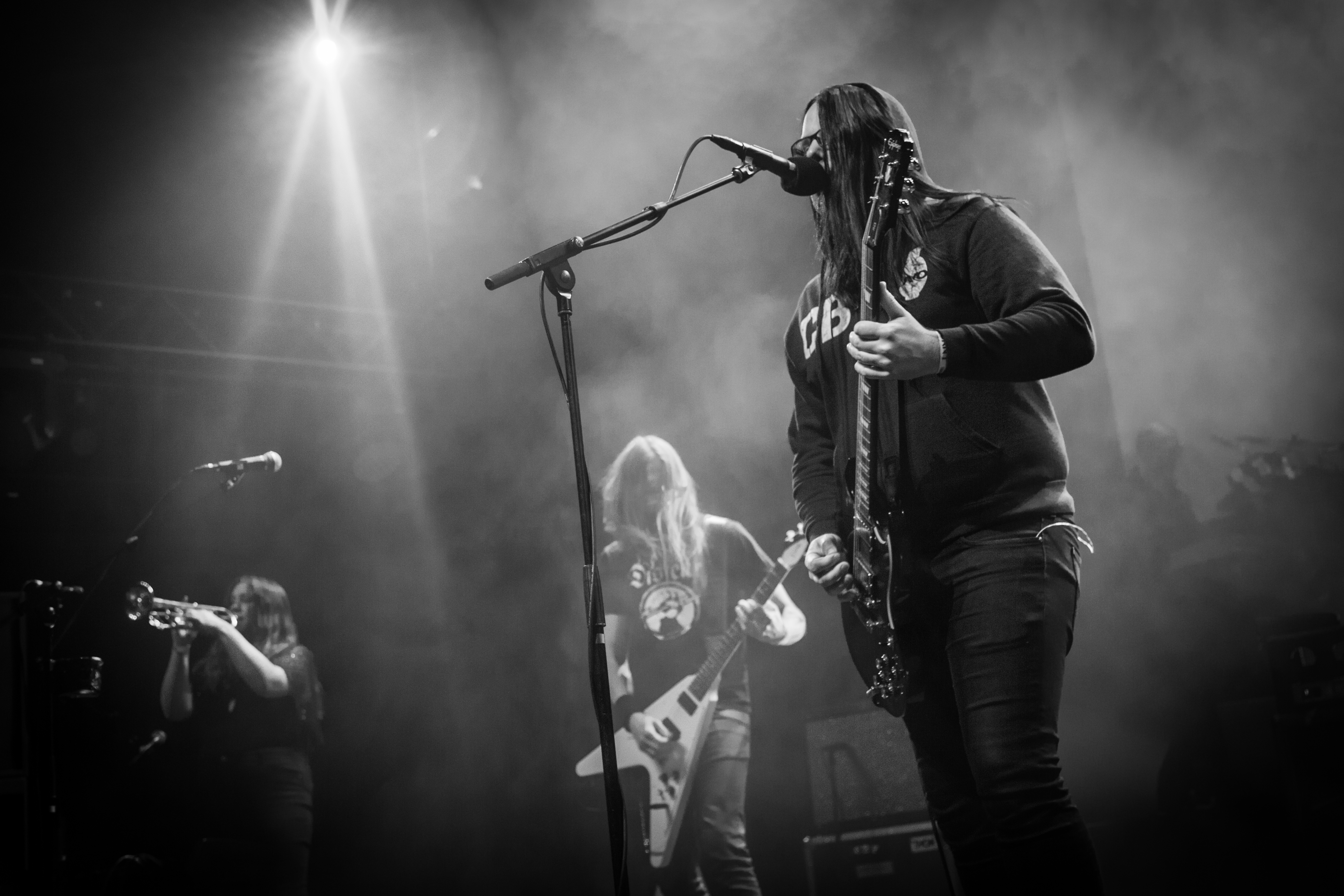
- Crippled Black Phoenix at the Roadburn Festival 2017

Background information
- Origin: United Kingdom
- Genres: Post-rock, progressive rock, experimental rock
- Years active: 2004–present
- Labels: Invada, Cool Green Recordings, Mascot Music Productions, Season of Mist
- Website: https://riseupandfight.bandcamp.com/

Crippled Black Phoenix are an English dark rock band, founded by Justin Greaves in 2004. They have released 13 full length, countless EPs and special albums and toured internationally. Besides Greaves, several musicians have contributed to Crippled Black Phoenix's discography and played with them during their live shows.

== History ==
In 2004, Justin Greaves, previously drummer of several doom and sludge bands like Iron Monkey, Electric Wizard and Teeth of Lions Rule the Divine, began recording his own material. He was encouraged by Dominic Aitchison of Mogwai, and their ideas would lay the backbone for Crippled Black Phoenix. The name of the band was taken from the lyrics (by Johnny Morrow of Iron Monkey) of "Big Loader," a song on the debut album Iron Monkey. Greaves also used "Crippled Black Phoenix" as a pseudonym. Band members have chiefly been drawn from other bands to which Greaves has contributed; including Iron Monkey, Gonga, Mogwai, Electric Wizard, Hearts of Black Science and others.

Greaves and the band write what they call "endtime ballads" signifying both the melodic but slightly macabre nature of their songs and their unusual blend of styles, as the final evolution in music. This blend has led to them being called everything from progressive rock to dark folk, to psychedelic, to post rock/metal. Initially the band was produced by Geoff Barrow of Portishead fame, under his label Invada Records. Barrow occasionally played live in the first appearances of the band in 2007. Crippled Black Phoenix have made live shows a focus and have performed onstage - usually in a formation from 6 to even 9 members - also in peculiar venues, using folk and Victorian-era instruments in tandem with their rock elements.

The innate, ever ongoing evolution of Crippled Black Phoenix has reflected on multiple turnovers in his line-ups, both studio and live. Of the first versions of the band, the most relevant changes were the departures of original singer/guitarist Joe Volk, who embarked on a solo career (2012) and guitarist Karl Demata (2014), who later founded the band Vly together with departing bassist Christian Heilmann. Following the split, Greaves and Demata engaged in a legal dispute over the registered trademark of the band's name. In the second half of 2015, the issue with former guitarist was resolved and mastermind Greaves was able to continue his run under the moniker Crippled Black Phoenix, following his vision and continuing to be very prolific with different incarnations of the band and his cast of rotating musicians.

A new phase of CBP started in 2014 with the arrival of Swedish guitarist/vocalist Daniel Anghede: a voice that Greaves confessed to have always wanted to work with, at the point he was supposed to be on the debut album of the band. As a parallel project, female singer Belinda Kordic and Greaves formed the duo Se Delan. A second project involving Greaves and Kordic was called World War, later Johnny The Boy. Another major change of CBP's path happened in 2019, when Daniel Anghede left the band after six years and a prolific run of four studio albums and extensive touring. He later announced a project ("Venus Principle"), a sort of CBP spin-off, with other former bandmates.

Greaves announced in the summer of 2020 the start of a new era of the band, continuing temporarily with a main core of 4 members while in search of a new co-singer, with a more prominent role for Kordic. A brand new album, Ellengæst was released October 2020, featuring several guest vocalists. Metal Hammer named it as the 43rd best metal album of 2020. Swedish Joel Segerstedt is announced as new co-singer and rhythm guitarist at the end of April, 2021. His first recording with the band was the single "Painful Reminder/Dead Is Dead. In April 2022, Crippled Black Phoenix announced a new full length album, Banefyre, and their first European Tour after the Covid-19 pandemic. With Segerstedt soon gone, in November 2024 the band celebrated 20 years of music with a double album, The Wolf Changes Its Fur But Not Its Nature & Horrific Honorifics Number Two(2), which contained new versions of old material and covers that inspired the collective through the years. Male vocalist/guitarist is found in Justin Storms, but also old time collaborator Ryan Patterson guests on many songs of this era.

End January, 2026 Crippled Black Phoenix launches "Ravenettes", first single of new album Sceaduhelm, due later in the year.

== Band ==
=== Current touring lineup ===
- Justin Greaves – electric and acoustic guitars, bass, drums (studio), saw, keyboards, banjo, effects, samples, backing vocals (2004–present)
- Belinda Kordic – vocals, percussions (2011–present)
- Georg Paco Ludwig Fleischfresser – synth, keyboards, sax, back vocals, vocoder (2021–2024, 2026–present)
- Justin Storms – vocals, guitar (2023–present)
- René Misje – guitar (2023–present)
- Wesley J Wasley – bass (2025–present)
- Timo Kosi – drums (2026–present)

=== Former members ===
- Dominic Aitchison – bass, effects (2004–2009)
- Joe Volk – vocals, acoustic guitar (2006–2012)
- Kostas Panagiotou – piano, keys, mellotron, harmonium, accordion, backing vocals (2006–2009)
- Nial McGaughey – guitars (2006-2007)
- Mark Ophidian – synth, vocoder, Mellotron (2006–2012)
- Charlotte "Chipper" Nicholls – cello, vocals (2007–2009)
- Matt "Team Brick" Williams – synth, Hammond organ, effects, accordion, clarinet, backing vocals (2007–2009)
- Karl Demata – guitars, vocals (2009–2014)
- Christian Heilmann – bass (2009–2014)
- Daisy Chapman – piano, keyboards, vocals, backing vocals (2009–2019)
- Merijn Royaards – drums (2009–2011)
- Danny Ashberry – synths, keyboards, Hammond organ (2009–2010)
- Ben Wilsker – drums (2011–2019, 2025)
- Miriam Wolf – piano, keyboards, vocals, backing vocals (2011–2012)
- Mark Furnevall – synth, keyboards, organ, mellotron, bass, backing vocals (2011–2019)
- Matt Simpkin – vocals (2012 live only)
- John E Vistic – vocals (2012); trombone (2009 session)
- Daniel Änghede – vocals, guitars (2013–2019)
- Niall Hone – bass (2015–2016)
- Jonas Stålhammar – guitars (2015–2019)
- Tom Greenway – bass (2016–2019)
- Helen Stanley – piano, keyboards, synth, trumpet, vocals, backing vocals (2016–2023)
- Andy Taylor – guitars (2018–2025)
- Joel Segerstedt – vocals, guitars (2021–2023)
- Matt Crawford – bass (2021–2025)
- Lucy Marshall – keyboards, piano, synth, hammond, mellotron, back vocals (2023–2025)
- Jordi Farré – drums (2021–2025)

=== Collaborators, guests and live musicians ===
- Geoff Barrow - producer, drums
- Andy Semmens - vocals
- Thomas Elgie - drums
- George Elgie - guitars, backing vocals
- Jack Rampling - violin
- Baz Barrett - bass
- Chrissie Caulfield - violin, harp, fog horn
- Stu Matthews - percussions
- Dave Greaves - guitars
- Charlie Romijn - bass, guitars, backing vocals
- Joe Allen - synth, bass
- Michael L.B. West - keyboards
- David Eugene Edwards - vocals
- Robert Holm - trumpet, brass
- Cypress Grove - vocals
- Bertrand Cantat - vocals
- Mark Lanegan - vocals
- Suzie Stapleton - vocals, guitar
- Mick Cozens - guitars, keyboards
- Max Milton - trumpet, violin, viola
- Guy Metcalfe - drums
- Jon Attwood - guitars
- Paul Harris - trumpet
- Paul Eros - horn
- Sally Wragg - violin, viola
- Paul Booker - double bass
- Martin Collins - drums
- Andy Solomon - keyboards, backing vocals
- Arthur Young - keyboards, bass
- Georgi Malchev - guitar
- David John Norman - polistrumentist, backing vocals
- Suzi Gage - flute
- Liz Purnell - trombone
- Emma Hooper - viola
- Sue Lord - violin
- Robert Potter - mandola
- Martin Horsefall - trumpet, brass
- Eric Mansfield (aka James Ray) - vocals
- Ewan Davies - metal pipe, drone
- Pete Wassif - guitars
- David Mako - vocals
- Arvid Jonsson - vocals
- Nikita Kamprad - guitars
- Gaspar Binder - drums
- Ryan Patterson - bass, vocals
- Rob Al-Issa - bass
- Vincent Cavanagh - vocals
- Gaahl - vocals
- Jonathan Hultén - vocals
- Jörgen "Juggo" Wall - vibraphone, drums
- Martin Hyde - percussions
- Robin Tow - percussions
- Iver Sandøy - percussions

== Discography ==
=== Studio albums ===
- A Love of Shared Disasters (2007 Invada Records)
- The Resurrectionists (2009 Invada Records)
- Night Raider (2009 Invada Records)
- I, Vigilante (2010 Invada Records)
- (Mankind) The Crafty Ape (2012 Mascot Music Production)
- No Sadness or Farewell (2012 Cool Green Recordings)
- White Light Generator (2014 Cool Green Recordings)
- New Dark Age (2015 Season of Mist)
- Bronze (2016 Season of Mist)
- Great Escape (2018 Season of Mist)
- Ellengæst (2020 Season of Mist)
- Banefyre (2022 Season of Mist)
- Sceaduhelm (2026 Season of Mist)

=== Singles, Mini and Special albums ===
- Sharks & Storms / Blizzard Of Horned Cats (2006 Invada Records)
- Childhood's End (with Se Delan) (2015 Self released)
- Oh'Ech-oes (with Se Delan) (2015 Clearview Records)
- Horrific Honorifics (2017 Season of Mist)
- Budapest Vigilante Sessions (2017 Rad Nauseam)
- Painful Reminder/Dead is Dead (2021 Season Of Mist)
- Beautiful Destroyer (2024 Bandcamp one-off track)
- The Wolf Changes Its Fur But Not Its Nature + Horrific Honorifics Number Two (2) (2024 Season Of Mist)
- Horrific Honorifics Number Two Point Five (2.5) (2026 Season Of Mist, present in Sceaduhelm Deluxe edition)

=== Compilations ===
- 200 Tons of Bad Luck (2009 Invada Records)
- Extra Tracks (2009 Self released)
- An Original Album Collection ("New Dark Age" + "Bronze" box set) (2019 Season Of Mist)
- Man Confused, Vol. I-II: Various Demo Action 2004-2011, 2011-2018 AD (2020 Self Released)
- Various Types Of Dread (A Collection Of Confusion) (2020, Self Released)
- Champions Of Disturbance - A rough guide to CBP (2021, Self Released)

=== Live albums ===
- Poznan 2011 A.D. (2012 Clearview Records), re-released as Live Poznan (2013 Cool Green Recordings)
- Live in Bern 2012 A.D. (2013 Self released), re-released as We Shall See Victory (2020 Kscope)
- Destroy Freak Valley (2017 Rock Freaks Records)

=== Official bootlegs ===
- Live at Burg Herzberg Festival, 2011 A.D. (2013 Self released)
- In a Cave (Live 2014 A.D.) (2015 Self released)
- Demons in Aschaffenburg 2019 A.D. (2020 Self released)
- Astorias Vigilantes - Live At Stone Fest 2018 A.D. (2020 Self released)
- Born For Nothing/Paranoid Arm Of Narcoleptic Empire, Live In Switzerland 2009 A.D.
- Long Live Independence, Live On Rockpalast 2012 A.D. (2020 Self released)
- Perfect Concert For Total Pleasure, Live Budapest 2018 A.D. (2020 Self released)
- A New Dark Age, Live in Slowakia 2015 A.D. (2020 Self released)
- Wytches & Basterdz, Live at Lottfest 2017 A.D. (2020 Self Released)
- Dancing Gummy Bears, Live in Warsaw 2012 A.D. (2020 Self Released)
- Half Alive, Live in Germany 2010 A.D. (2020 Self Released)
- Frankfurtenstein 2010 A.D. (2020 Self Released)
- Le Grand Mix, Paris 2007 A.D. (2020 Self Released)
- The Heart Of Belgrade, KC Grad. Live in Serbia 2012 A.D. (2020 Self Released)
- Bavarian Blues - Nürnberg 2016 A.D. (2021 Self Released)
- Totally Eclipsed in 2010 A.D. (2021 Self Released)
- Poznan & Herzberg Live 2011 A.D. (2021, Self Released live compilation)
- Three Wyches And A Dog. Live At Vera, Groningen, 2012 A.D. (2021, Self Released)
- Roadburn 2017 A.D. (2022, Self Released)
- Roadburn 2019 A.D. (2022, Self Released)
- Roadburn - Live Echoes (2022, Self Released)
- Nihtgield - Live Document 2022 A.D. (2025, Self Released)

=== Official videoclips and Promo Videos ===
- Laying Traps (2012 Cool Green Recordings)
- Northern Comfort (2014 Mascot Label Group)
- Scared And Alone (2016 Season Of Mist)
- Great Escape Pt.1 (2018 Season Of Mist)
- Cry Of Love (2020 Season Of Mist)
- Lost (2020 Season Of Mist)
- Painful Reminder (2021 Season Of Mist)
- Blackout77 (2022 Season Of Mist)
- Everything Is Beautiful But Us (2022 Season Of Mist)
- Bonefire (2022 Season Of Mist)
- Goodnight, Europe (Pt. II) (2024 Season Of Mist)
- Self Control (2024 Season Of Mist)
- 444 (2024 Season Of Mist)
- Blueprint (2024 Season Of Mist)
- Ravenettes (2026 Season Of Mist)

=== Live videos ===
- Live At Rockpalast, Crossroads Festival (2012)

=== Alternative album versions ===
- I, Vigilante - Instrumental (2020 Self Released)
- A Love Of Instrumental Disasters (2020 Self Released)

=== Other appearances ===
- We Are Only Riders - The Jeffrey Lee Pierce Sessions Project (2009 Glitterhouse Records)
- Axels and Sockets - The Jeffrey Lee Pierce Sessions Project (2014 Glitterhouse Records)
- Mojo Presents - The Wall Re-Built! (2010)

=== Soundtracks ===
- Future Shock! The Story of 2000AD (as Justin Greaves)
- The Devil's Business (as Justin Greaves)
