= Movieoke =

Form of entertainment

Movieoke /muːviˈoʊki/ (Japanese: ムービーオケ [mɯːbiːoke]) is a form of entertainment in which an amateur actor or actors perform along with a muted DVD in order to give voice to the characters in the film. The film is projected onto a screen behind the actor and onto an alternate monitor which provides subtitles and action cues. Movieoke is a popular form of performative and interactive entertainment created by Anastasia Fite in New York City in 2003, and has since spread to other parts of the world.

== Word origin ==
The word stems from the English word "movie" and the Japanese word "karaoke", which itself stems from the word kara (空), meaning "empty", and the English word "orchestra". This term used to be slang for media where pre-recorded acting is substituted by a live performance. The term movieoke can be interpreted as "virtual movie" because one can act along without the presence of a camera or crew.

== History ==
Karaoke has been a common form of musical entertainment at a dinner or a party in Japan, as in the rest of the world, for several decades.

Its newest cousin, Movieoke, was created and launched by Anastasia Fite in a screening room/bar in The East Village of New York City in 2003. A projector is connected to a DVD player so that the image is cast onto a screen behind the participant(s), an alternate monitor is placed in front of the participant in order to provide them with line and action cues from the film. Anastasia would mute the voice of the actor(s) in the film so that the participant could give voice to the character in the film, much to the audience's participation and delight.

The first cultural reference for Movieoke came from the 1993 film Arizona Dream starring Johnny Depp, Jerry Lewis and Vincent Gallo. During a talent show scene one of the characters performs a version of Movieoke (though does not mention the word movieoke). Vincent Gallo's character Paul Leger performs a step by step remake of the famous crop dusting scene from Alfred Hitchcock's North by Northwest as the film is projected over him on stage. Slightly different from East Village Movieoke in that the sound of the film is still present, Gallo syncs with the actor's dialog on stage.

Since these early Movieoke events, other businesses have cropped up which make technological advances allowing for people to enact Movieoke on their home computer, one such company is KaraMovie Inc., who introduced the MoXie Player in 2006 which provides the means to receive movieoke content via the internet.

Released in November 2008, the Xbox 360 Game "You're in The Movies" could be considered the latest incarnation of the movieoke theme. While players do not reenact scenes from famous movies, but rather direct and act in their own films—much of the actions and verisimilitude is the same as Movieoke.

Live Movieoke events for the public still take place periodically around the world. A version of movieoke is at the Edinburgh Fringe Festival in 2025.
