= Barry Barker =

British curator

Barry Barker is a British contemporary art curator and gallerist.

== Career ==
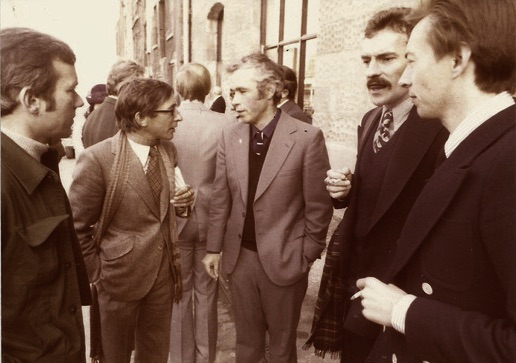
Barry Barker (on the right) with fellow art curators and artists at the reopening of the Arnolfini, Bristol in 1975, where he subsequently became director

Previously, Barker worked with Nigel Greenwood and was exhibitions officer at the Institute of Contemporary Arts London and the John Hansard Gallery before becoming Director of the Arnolfini in Bristol 1986-1991 overseeing a refurbishment of the gallery. Following this, Barker was briefly with the South Bank Centre before becoming a Director of the Lisson Gallery. Barker's main areas of interest have been conceptual art and minimal and he had an influential role in many artists' careers over a thirty year period, especially Anish Kapoor. In 1986, he was co-curator of "Falls the Shadow" with Jon Thompson at the Hayward Gallery. He moved to become Head of the University of Brighton gallery, responsible for the Visions programme of contemporary artists as well as supporting student exhibitions.

== Publications ==
- La costrucció de la vida de…/ The Making of the Life of... in El que vols que digui…Jo ja sóc mort/ What you want me to say… I'm already dead/ Lo que quieres que diga…Yoya estoy muerto. Edited by V.I. Brichs. Publisher: Fundació Joan Miró 2006, ISBN 84-934730-1-4.
- [re]imaging the world, the work of Jane and Louise Wilson in Jane and Louise Wilson. Editors: F. J. Panera. Publisher: Ediciones Universidad de Salamanca, 2003. ISBN 84-7800-705-9.

== Major exhibitions curated ==
- 'Our Magic Hour (Ugo Rondinone)'. Photographic exhibition University of Brighton Gallery, 7 October – 2 November 2002.
- David Austen film Crackers, the central feature of the David Austen exhibition at the Milton Keynes Gallery, 10 February – 23 March 2007.
