= Shobana Jeyasingh Dance =

British dance company

Shobana Jeyasingh Dance is a British dance company based at Somerset House in London and founded in 1989 by the company's artistic director and choreographer, Shobana Jeyasingh. The company has toured internationally including India, Hong Kong, Singapore, Seoul, USA, Sweden, Italy, Austria and throughout the United Kingdom (UK). It has received three Digital Dance Awards, two Time Out Dance Awards and the London Music and Dance Award.

The company also provides school and community education through apprenticeships, workshops, technique classes, and residency programmes.

In 2019, the company celebrated its 30th anniversary and to mark this landmark, made especially commissioned work as well as launched a number of flagship programmes.
