= Great Reading Adventure =

Citywide reading campaign in Bristol, England

The Great Reading Adventure was introduced in 2003 as part of Bristol's bid to be European Capital of Culture 2008. It was inspired by an equivalent scheme in Chicago, where they were reading Harper Lee's To Kill a Mockingbird. In its first year in excess of 15,000 people read Treasure Island by Robert Louis Stevenson as part of the scheme. When the 2004 scheme launched, Bristol was the only city in Britain to have such a project, but plans were underway for London to introduce one.

As part of the 2005 celebrations of the 70th Anniversary of sponsors Penguin Publishing, they selected The Siege by Helen Dunmore as that year's book. Dunmore had moved to Bristol 29 years previously, and launched that year's events. It was also split up into roughly three age categories, with The Siege being suggested for adults, teenagers being recommended Carrie's War by Nina Bawden and younger children Tara's Treehouse which was also by Dunmore. Penguin also planned to get other British cities reading relevant books of their choice.

From 2006 the scheme extended to the whole of South West England, involving the distribution of about 40,000 copies of the Jules Verne novel Around the World in 80 Days. They involved around 70 Swindon schools, 80 Bristol schools and all 15 library authorities in the South West.

In 2009 Edinburgh and Glasgow joined Bristol, along with Hampshire County Council and fifteen library authorities in the southwest of England. The chosen book, Arthur Conan Doyle's The Lost World, was republished with a new cover designed by Aardman Animations. The book was distributed in all participating areas along with a comic biography of Charles Darwin. 2009 is the 150th anniversary of Conan Doyle's birth and the bicentenary of Darwin's.

== List of books by Year ==
2003 – Treasure Island by Robert Louis Stevenson
2004 – The Day of the Triffids by John Wyndham
2005 – The Siege by Helen Dunmore
2006 – Around the World in 80 Days by Jules Verne
2007 – Small Island by Andrea Levy
2008 – The Bristol Story – a specially commissioned graphic novel
2009 – The Lost World by Arthur Conan Doyle

2014 - Bristol and the First World War – a specially commissioned graphic novel
