= Goat Island (performance group) =

Goat Island was a collaborative performance group based in Chicago, Illinois and founded in 1987. They toured internationally and made nine performance works before disbanding. In 2006 they announced The Lastmaker (2007) would be the last work that they would create as a company, and the final performances were held at Swain Hall, University of North Carolina, Chapel Hill, in February 2009.

As their final project, they created a film based on The Lastmaker, published under the title A Last, A Quartet a collection of films, which also contained previous films made by Goat Island.

In 2019, the Chicago Cultural Center hosted a cross disciplinary retrospective: goat island archive – we have discovered the performance by making it. The event included an exhibition, archives, a performance series, and symposia.

== Members ==
Goat Island members have included:

- Karen Christopher (1990-2009)
- Joan Dickinson (1988-1990)
- Matthew Goulish (1987-2009)
- Lin Hixson (director, 1997-2009)
- Mark Jeffery (1996-2009)
- Greg McCain (1987-1995)
- Timothy McCain (1987-1995)
- Antonio Poppe (1995-1996)
- Bryan Saner (1995-2009)
- Litó Walkey (2002-2009)

Goat Island associate members have included: Cynthia Ashby, Lucy Cash (2005 - 2009), CJ Mitchell, Judd Morrissey (2005 - 2009), Margaret Nelson, John Rich, Charissa Tolentino (2008), Chantal Zakari

== Performances ==
- Soldier, Child, Tortured Man (1987)
- We Got A Date (1989)
- Can't Take Johnny to the Funeral (1991)
- It's Shifting, Hank (1993)
- How Dear To Me the Hour When Daylight Dies (1996)
- The Sea & Poison (1998)
- It's an Earthquake in My Heart (2001)
- When will the September roses bloom? Last night was only a comedy (2004)
- The Lastmaker (2007)

== Sources ==
- Bottoms, Stephen J., and Matthew Goulish, eds. 2007. Small Acts of Repair: Performance, Ecology, and Goat Island. London and New York: Routledge. ISBN 978-0-415-36515-4.
- Goat Island, 2000. "School Book 2: Goat Island." Chicago: Goat Island and The School of the Art Institute of Chicago.
- Goulish, Matthew. 2000. 39 Microlectures: In Proximity of Performance. London and New York: Routledge. ISBN 978-0-415-21393-6.
- Hixson, Lin and Goulish, Matthew. 2007. "A Lasting Provocation". TDR: The Drama Review 51.4 (T 196 Winter): 2-3.
- Lowe, Nicholas, and Skaggs, Sarah, 2020 (editor Mike Vanden Heuvel) "Goat Island". American Theatre Ensembles Volume 1. Post-1970: Theatre X, Mabou Mines, Goat Island, Lookingglass Theatre, Elevator Repair Service, and SITI Company. Methuen Drama/Bloomsbury Press, London, UK. ISBN 978-1-350-05154-6 129-221.
