= Gonga (band) =

English stoner metal band

- Origin: Bristol, England
- Genres: Stoner metal
- Years active: 1998–present
- Labels: Invada (2003–2008); ToneHenge (2013–present)
- Members: George Elgie; Thomas Elgie; Latch Manghat
- Past members: William Smalley; Hugo Morgan; Hallam Kite; Joe Volk; Matt Williams; Peter Theobalds

Gonga are an English stoner metal band from Bristol.

== History ==
The band formed early 1998 and debuted live in 2001 at Shambala Festival held in Somerset, England. They released their self-titled debut album in 2003 through Invada Records. After recording sophomore album II: Transmigration, lead vocalist Joe Volk left the band in 2007 and joined Crippled Black Phoenix. As an instrumental three-piece, full-length album Concrescence followed in 2013 through new imprint ToneHenge Recordings.

For Record Store Day 2014 the band released 12" single "Black Sabbeth" containing a cover of "Black Sabbath" featuring guest vocals by Beth Gibbons of Portishead.

== Discography ==
=== Studio albums ===
Year	Album details
2003	Gonga: Released: 2003; Label: Invada; Format: CD
2008	II: Transmigration: Released: 2008; Label: Invada; Format: CD
2013	Concrescence: Released: 7 October 2013; Label: Tonehenge Recordings; Format: CD, vinyl

=== Extended plays ===
Year	Album details
2012	Precession: Released: 2012; Label: self-released; Format: Digital

=== Singles ===
- "Stratofortress" (2003)
- "Mosquitos" (2004)
- "From Under the Trees" (2004)
- "Black Sabbeth" (Feat. Beth Gibbons) (2014)
