= The Bristol Art Library =

British art and performance project

The Bristol Art Library

The Bristol Art Library (TBAL) is an art and performance project created in 1998 by the British artist Annabel Other. It consists of handmade books in a library the size of a suitcase.

== History ==
The project was devised as a protest at the closure of the original Bristol Art Library. The library consists of handmade identically-bound books on a wide range of subjects produced by individual contributors from all areas of the arts and sciences, each catalogued according to the Dewey Decimal System. The books are contained within a small wooden cabinet and made available when Other "performs" the library in the guise of the Head Librarian. Although TBAL is primarily an artistic endeavour, it borrows the rhetoric of, and operates as a public institution with affiliations to official library organisations worldwide. Readers must fill in appropriate application forms and adhere to strict library rules, whereupon the books can be read using a reader's ticket whenever the library is open for lending.

Membership is free. Friends of The Bristol Art Library (FOTBAL) can sit on a special cushion when reading books and receive the library's internal newsletter. Assistant librarians attend training sessions led by the Head Librarian, including book-stamping and shushing techniques. TBAL has a gift shop selling tea towels, bookmarks, badges, and postcards. The library travels from venue to venue in a hand-pulled red shopping trolley.

The Bristol Art Library officially opened its doors in New York at Printed Matter, Inc in 1998. It lent its first book to an air hostess during the flight from London to New York. Since then, TBAL's interdisciplinary collection has toured worldwide to over 200 venues and events including Metropolitan Museum of Art, Museum of Jurassic Technology, Harvard University, BALTIC Centre for Contemporary Art, De La Warr Pavilion, Glastonbury Festival, Hay Festival, WOMAD, Hauser & Wirth Somerset, Tate St Ives, and toured extensively in the USA, Poland, and Japan. It has a growing membership of over 12,000 and houses in excess of 250 books.

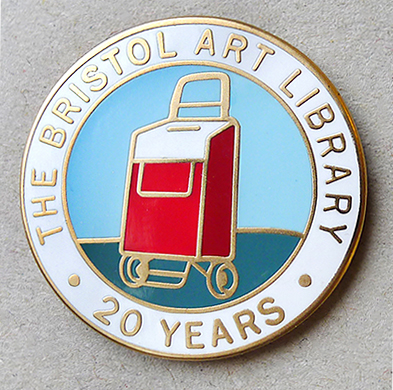
Enamel badge commemorating 20 years of The Bristol Art Library
