= Circomedia =

Circus and theater school in England

Coordinates: 51.4611°N 2.5847°W

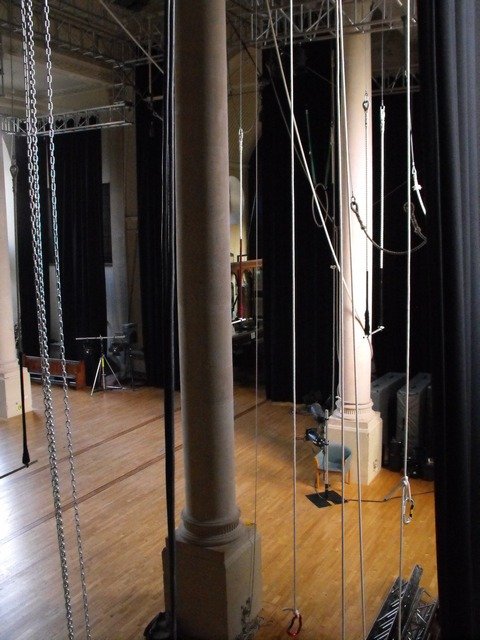
Interior of St Paul's Church, Bristol; the pillars, circus training floor, ropes and trapezes of Circomedia circus school, 2010

Circomedia is a school for contemporary circus and physical theatre based in Bristol, England. The school offers a variety of training courses and workshops that teach circus skills in the context of physical theatre, performance and creativity.

It was founded in 1993 by Bim Mason and Helen Crocker, following the closure of Fooltime, Britain's first circus school. It is financially supported by Arts Council South West and a range of other funding.

Since 2004, Circomedia has been based in the redundant St. Paul's Church at Portland Square, Bristol, and a site in Kingswood, Bristol, which is home to the degree programme and the main office.

== Courses ==
At the core of the school's training programme is the one-year Diploma in Circus Skills and Physical Theatre, which includes trapeze, juggling, acrobatics and physical theatre. After completing the diploma, students may join the 10-week Act Creation Course, or may undertake teacher training.

Other training programmes include:

- a BA (Hons) in Contemporary Circus with Physical Performance
- a Foundation Degree (FdA) in Contemporary Circus and Physical Performance in partnership with Bath Spa University
- a BTEC National Diploma in Performance for 16+
- adult evening classes open to the general public
- circus workshops and team-building events

== Outreach ==
Circomedia also runs an outreach programme for local young people.

== See also ==
- Dick Penny, formerly a member of the board of Circomedia
- Ockham's Razor Theatre Company, formed in 2004 by three Circomedia alumni
- Circus school
