= Ockham's Razor Theatre Company =

Aerial theatre company

Ockham's Razor Theatre Company is a British aerial theatre company. Their critically acclaimed work combines circus and theatre, and they specialise in creating physical theatre on original pieces of aerial equipment and create stories from the vulnerability, trust and reliance that exists between people in the air. Ockham's Razor are produced by Turtle Key Arts.

== Background ==
The company was formed in 2004 by Alex Harvey, Tina Koch and Charlotte Mooney. With their unique physical skills the company have performed a number of shows that "combine circus and visual theatre to make work that is arresting and entertaining". The company's name derives from a philosophy of William of Ockham known as Ockham's Razor that states that the simplest theory should always be chosen – this reflects the way in which the company work as they aim to always keep their work understandable and easy for the audience to relate to. Rather than portray the circus performer as a superhuman character capable of impressive feats, they create works that draw on the human and the real, where the characters go through recognisable experiences, emotions and conflicts which the audience can identify with and relate to.

== Productions ==
The company's shows include Arc, Every Action..., Memento Mori, The Mill, and the upcoming Not Until We Are Lost as well as various other projects for young children and families such as Hang On and Something in the Air; an "audience participatory show for young people with complex disabilities". The Mill, a piece about work and physical labour reviewed by Lyn Gardner as "a terrifically imaginative and original show", is their most recent and first feature length play, directed by Toby Sedgwick (director of War Horse) with Rufus Norris as dramaturg.

== The Founders of the Company ==
Alex Harvey, Charlotte Mooney and Tina Koch were all students of Circomedia, Academy of Circus Arts and Physical Performance in Bristol when they met. They had previously all been studying unrelated theatre subjects at separate universities: Harvey studied Fine Art at De Montfort University in Leicester, Mooney studied English Literature with Spanish at the University of Sussex as well as La Universidad de Santiago, Chile, and Koch studied Cultural Science and Aesthetic Communication at Universität Hildesheim, originally training as a dancer. Each found a passion for circus and physical theatre during their studies and went on together to found Ockham's Razor Theatre Company.

== See also ==
- Aerialist
- Physical theatre
- Circomedia
