= Cube Microplex =

Cinema and venue in Bristol, England

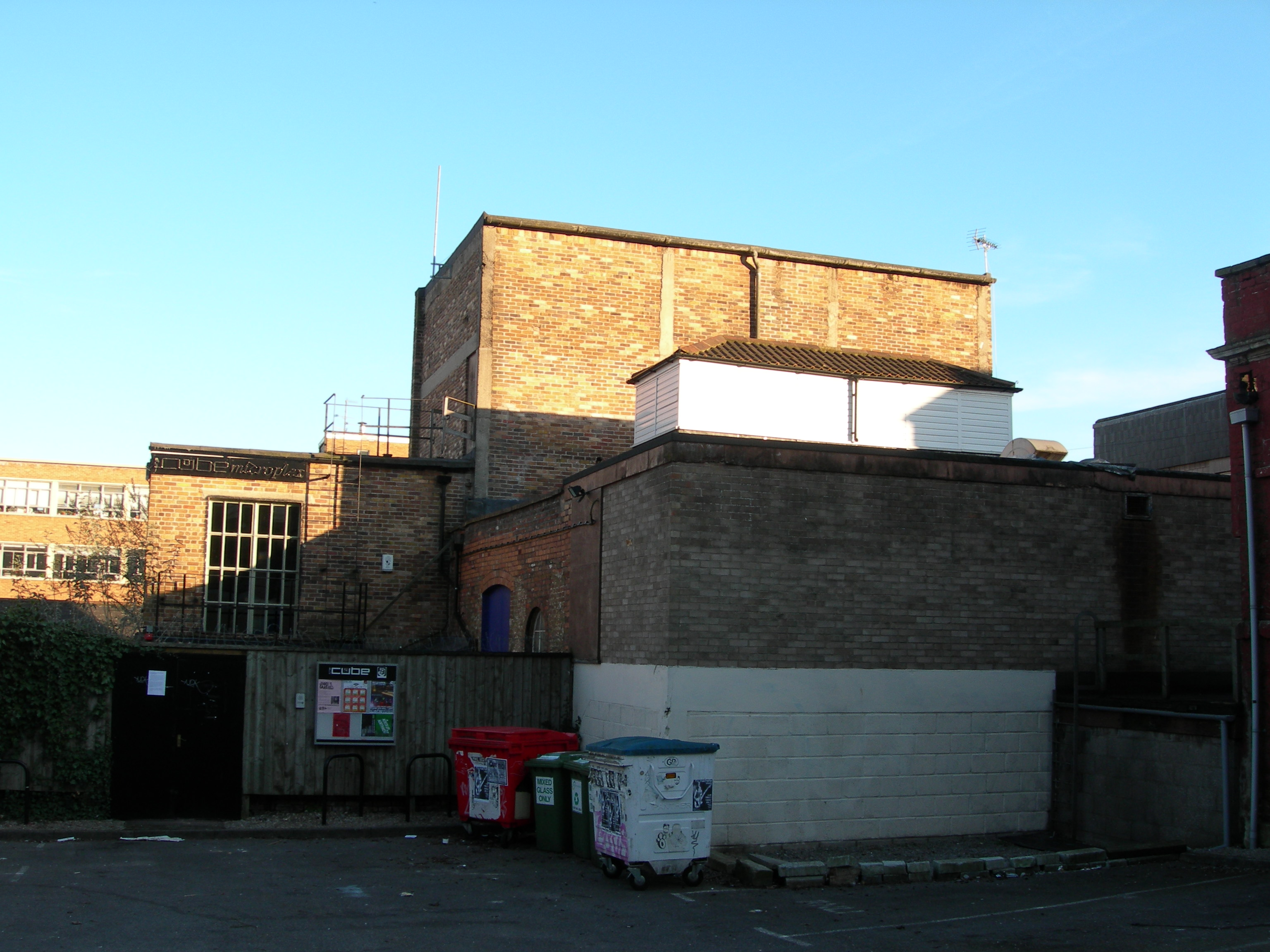
- Front entrance to the Cube

- Cube Microplex shown within Bristol

General information
- Location: Bristol, England
- Coordinates: 51.4611°N 2.5934°W

The Cube Microplex is a cinema and event venue in Bristol, England. It operates as a non-profit cooperative and is entirely staffed by volunteers. Since opening in 1998 it has hosted international and local artistic and cultural events including films and music performances as well as providing a focal point for Bristol's artistic community. The building includes a roughly 108 seat auditorium as well as a bar serving local and ethical products.

== History ==
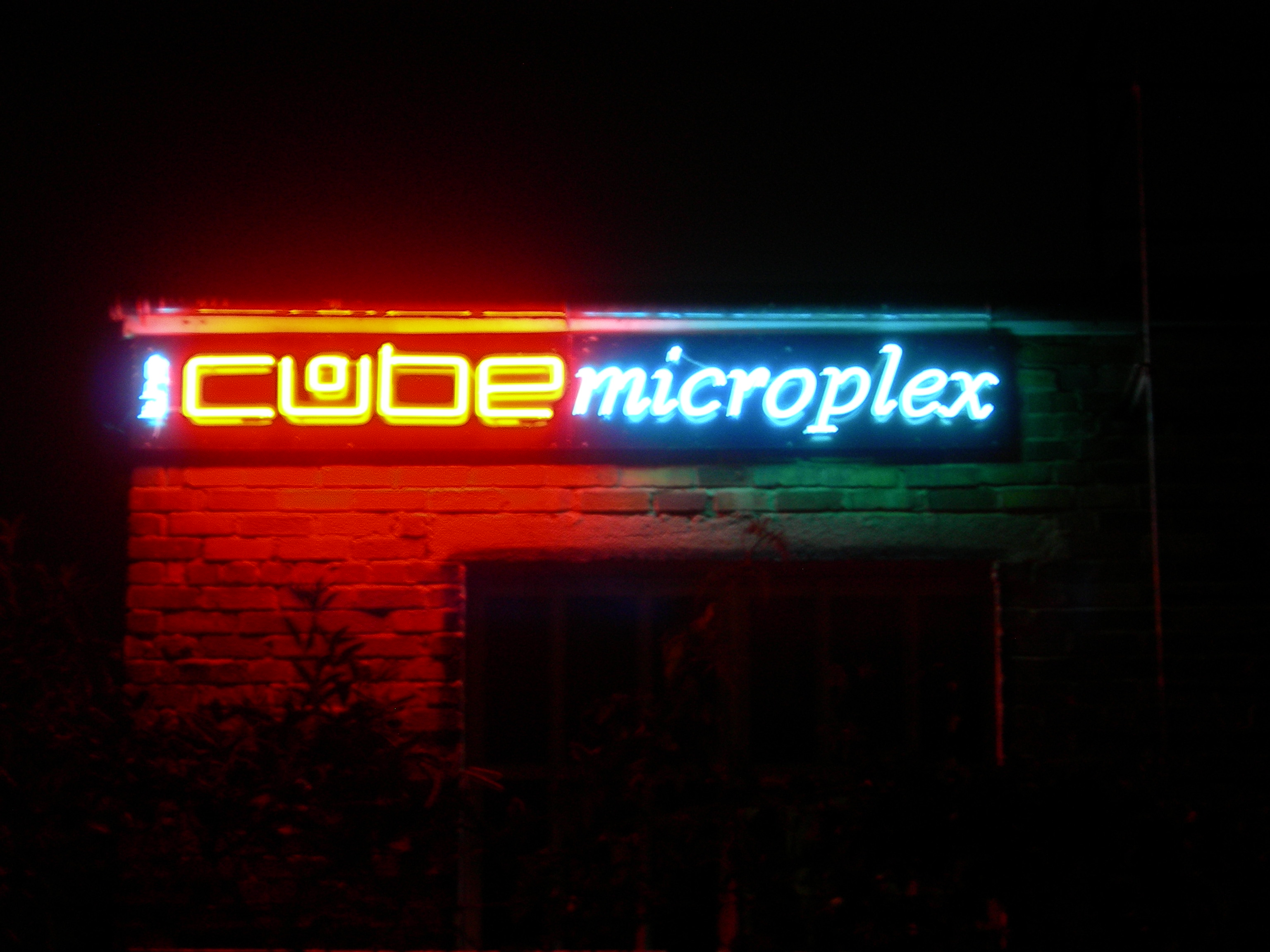
Cube Microplex neon signage

The wooden theatre at the heart of the Cube was adapted from a workshop by volunteers for an amateur dramatics group in 1964. The building itself has a long history as a community arts venue, built in 1916 as workshops for the Bristol Deaf Centre; and converted by a team of amateur theatre enthusiasts in 1964 into a theatre with auditorium and fly tower. A projection room and cinema screen were added in the 1970s.

The Cube opened its doors in its present form in October 1998. In July 2001 a serious fire originating in the New Mayflower kitchen destroyed most of the internal storeys and timber of 4 and 5 King Square. The Cube itself only sustained minor damage, but as its public entrance was accessed via a corridor between the fire damaged restaurant and kitchen, the Microplex was cut off from use by the general public. After extensive rebuilding work, the Cube reopened in August 2002 with a new entrance on Dove Street South.

In December 2013, a fund-raising project to buy the freehold of the Cube's building was successful in reaching its £185,000 target. On 1 April 2014 the Cube official became owned by Microplex Holdings Ltd, a non-profit Industrial and Provident Society and Community Land Trust (CLT) set up by Cube volunteers whose charter is to secure and maintain the freehold of the Cube Cinema as a community arts space in perpetuity.

== Programme ==
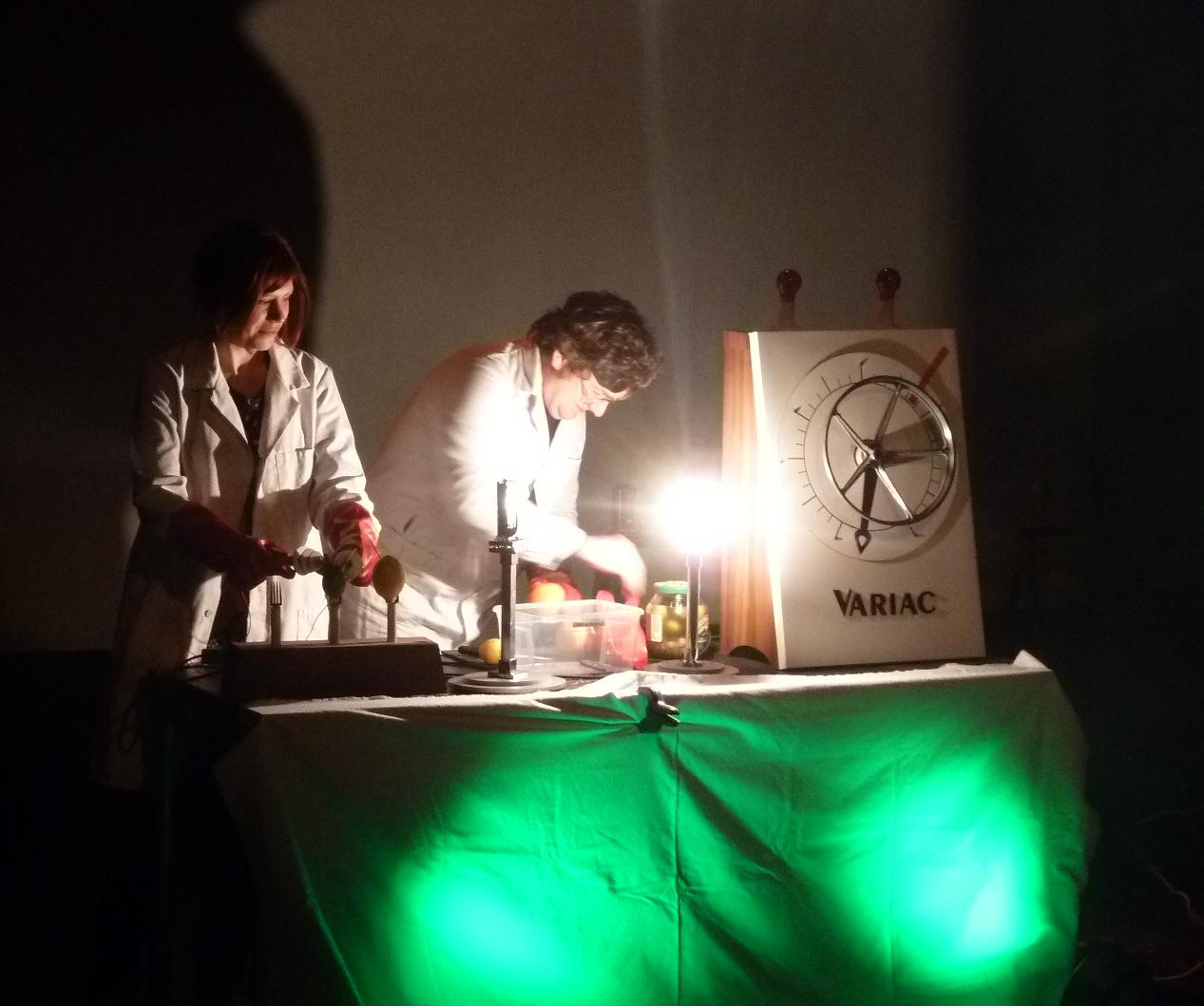
Science Cabaret at the Cube

The Cube's public programme averages over 350 events per year, with a monthly average attendance of 1500. Along with its cinema, music, performance and education programmes, the Cube hosts a wide range of local and international artists and community-initiated events. The film screenings include general and limited release mainstream films, art-house, cult films and work by local film makers. It offers special film screenings for mothers and babies. Regular nights have included stand-up comedy, screenings of classic or cult comedy films, and a movieoke evening, in which audience members act out their chosen film scenes on stage as they are played on the big screen. Weekends often feature live music and performances. The building is also periodically hired to third parties to put on their own events. The Cube has played hosts to seasons and festivals, including the Venn Festival, Ladyfest Bristol, Bristol Radical History Group, Ausform Platform of Performance and Independent Heroine festivals.

Its anti-corporate ethos led to projects such as Kate Rich and Kayle Brandon's Cube-Cola, based on an open source cola recipe, and Feral Trade which supplies various products to its bar using only personal social networks, including fair trade coffee from a farming cooperative in El Salvador. It has its own in-house improvising orchestra, the Orchestra Cube.

The Cube has a history of setting up temporary cinemas in exotic locations, including a tin mine in Cornwall. In March 2010, a group travelled to the aftermath of the Haiti earthquake to stage an open-air cinema showing mainstream and specially-created films to children, and in 2015 to Nepal following the April 2015 Nepal earthquake.

== The Cube Cinema Ltd ==
The Cube Cinema was incorporated in 1998 as a company limited by guarantee, constituted as a democratically run worker's co-operative. Its volunteer workforce has ranged in age from 8 to 65.
