= See No Evil (artwork) =

Art collection in Bristol, England

See No Evil is a collection of works of public art by multiple graffiti artists, located around Nelson Street in Bristol, England. The artwork was first created in an event in August 2011 that was Europe's largest street art festival at the time. It culminated with a block party. The street was mostly repainted in a repeat event in 2012. The artworks comprise murals of various sizes, in different styles, some painted on tower blocks, including the 12-storey St Lawrence House on Broad Street. The works were created under a road closure, using scaffolding and aerial work platforms.

== See No Evil 2011 ==
See No Evil 2011, was a week-long graffiti art event, that claimed to be the largest street art event of its kind in the UK, reaffirmed Bristol's high position in the UK's urban art movement, and supports the claim, that Bristol may be the current international center of this urban art movement. The city has a well established and thriving urban art scene, with many walls around the city decorated over the years by artistic graffiti, notably around the Stokes Croft area, often by local but international respected urban artists like Inkie and Banksy. "Urban and street art are widely felt to be an important part of the city's creative DNA" (Bennet). The event was organised by respected Bristol street artist Inkie (Tom Bingle) who emerged (like Banksy) out of Bristol's 1980s graffiti scene. Inkie said that the inspiration for the event arose partly from witnessing similarly grand street art projects in Lisbon and Melbourne: "I thought it was about time Bristol, home of urban art in the UK had an installation of this scale." "Nothing of this size and scale has ever taken place in the UK and it's an event that has captured the minds of some the world's most respected street artists. It's a major coupé that we've managed to pull this off in Bristol."

The event was coordinated by Inkie, along with Mike Bennett - Bristol City Council, Bristol based music promoter Team Love (made up of music producers Dave Harvey and Tom Payne) and Sam Brandt, director of Weapon of Choice Gallery. The Council contributed £40 000 to the project, on the assumption of attracting tourists, with place-making director Mike Bennett paying for half of the project through his salary. The £40 000 was to be matched by private donations. The organizers spent a year planning the project, with full support from the street's residents, businesses and building owners. Team Love (TL) organised the music festival and street party.

Before 20 August 2011, the chosen location, Nelson Street, was "one of the most depressing, ugly and run down streets in Bristol" (Mike Bennet). A dreary '1960's urban nightmare. Decaying and decrepit' (Inkie). "Bristol's Nelson Street was nothing but empty shells of grey buildings built by tasteless architects that stank of piss," a nondescript corridor of bleak, grey buildings between Broadmead and Colston Square in the city centre "It needs something big development-wise.... with the economy as it is, the prospect of any serious development here in the next five years is almost nonexistent." A spokesperson of one of the buildings said "anything that would revitalise the street and increase footfall for a minimal cost – then all the better."

The council viewed the project as a platform to revitalize the street and encourage its regeneration. The councils Executive member for culture Simon Cook said: "This project is very exciting for Bristol. ...this will put us on the map internationally" as a cultural and tourist attraction. Two years previously Banksy show at the City Museum and Art Gallery had attracted large crowds. The organisers also looked towards Melbourne, Australia, were a street project attracted almost half a million visitors a year as an example of how street art could help regenerate urban area.

The name 'See No Evil', Bennett explained, is from the three wise monkeys who see no evil, hear no evil and speak no evil. "It sort of works on the artistic element, and because it has a musical element to it as well. And of course because we're taking over the old magistrates' courts" and Police station. The irony of Inkie being invited to paint the very courts he was sentenced in after Operation Anderson years before, as the ringleader of 75 plus artists in the UK's largest graffiti-related arrest, was not lost. "Half the early graffiti artists in Bristol must have been taken to that police station or through the magistrates' courts at one time or another" . "I mean, we've legally painted the old juvenile and magistrates' courts where a few of these artists have been processed and charged. It was quite a surreal thing to see."

=== List of 2011 See No Evil artists ===
A total of 72 graffiti artists were invited to take part, including twenty of the world's leading artists. Writing in The Independent, Louisa McGillicuddy noted that only two of the artists were women.

Sources for the table below unless otherwise stated.

Artist and artists	From	Notes
Inkie*	London based, originally from Bristol	Influences: Mayan architecture, William Morris, Mouse & Kelly, Alphonse Mucha, The Arts & Crafts movement and Islamic geometry, punk rock album graphics, 2000AD comics and early New York people such as Dondi, Seen & T-Kid. Bio: Inkie, started out painting alongside 3D, Banksy, Goldie, The Chrome Angels and Nick Walker in 1983. For See No Evil he painted a four-floor high female art nouveau, using about 70-80 cans.
Kashink*	Paris	Bio: Moustache wearing Kashink is one of the few very active female artists in the graffiti/street art world. Style: Her multicoloured psychedelic style of painting is characterised by huge four eyed characters, with thick lines and vivid colours. Kashink only paints men, that often appear to be fat, hairy old school mobsters. Influences: inspired by Gilbert and George, Keith Haring, Frida Kahlo, Charles Burns and comic books.
Tats Crew	New York	Bio: a Bronx-based trio of (now) professional graffiti artists whose work is said to have "changed the perception of graffiti as art". They started by creating subway graffiti in the late 1980s, by 2001 their work was chosen to represent New York City muralists at the Smithsonian Institution 35th Annual Folklife Festival. Their work legally adorns several New York City public schools and hospitals.
El Mac	Los Angeles	Bio: Miles 'Mac' MacGregor, born in 1980, by the late 1990s he was painting technicolor aerosol versions of classic paintings by old European masters. This led to him being commissioned in 2003 by the Groeninge Museum in Bruges, Belgium to paint his interpretations of their collection of classic Flemish Primitive paintings. He works primarily in Phoenix and Los Angeles but also across every continent. Style: Photorealistic renderings of both the sublime and the humble.
Shoe	Amsterdam	Bio: Born in 1967, Niels Meulman is an artist, designer, and art director whose designs and artwork are in the permanent collections of the Stedelijk Museum in Amsterdam and The San Francisco Museum of Modern Art. He began tagging at age 12, and was well known by the time he was 18. Style: Meulman introduced Calligraffiti, via a successful solo exhibition in Amsterdam in 2007. It is a form of lettering that fuses calligraphy and graffiti.
Aryz	Barcelona	Style: He works with spray paint and paint rollers for his huge colourful works. For See No Evil he painted "a wolf in a lumberjack shirt with braces, up the side of a whole building, which looks stunning. He's only 22 and he just came and did it in a day and a half with rollers, didn't even project it" (Inkie)
Nick Walker	Bristol	Bio: Born in 1969, Walker emerged from the Bristol graffiti scene of the early 1980s. Style: he uses both spray can and very controlled, intricate stencilling. His style and humour have gained him a worldwide reputation.
Mr Jago*	Bristol	Style: A formerly Abstract Futurist style and commercial illustrator his current work focuses on layers of colour and shade with obscured, just-out-of-view figures.
Andy Council*	Bristol	Style: detailed compositions of imagined creatures made from iconic objects, architecture, structures and characters.
sheOne*	London based	Style: sheOne strokes are an abstract style that is rooted in the new wave graffiti era of early eighties New York.
Chu*	Walsall born, Bristol-based	Style: using computer-aided technologies, he produces anamorphic 3D graffiti which appears to burst out of the 2D surface when viewed from certain angles.
China Mike*	born in Bedford, Bristol	Style: photo-realistic painting. His work has evolved into more abstracted figurative work.
Sickboy *	Bristol	Style: Often produces humorous pieces, he is deemed by the financial press as one of the movement's most bankable artists.
Mr Wany	Brindisi	Bio: Andrea Sergio, born in 1978, at the age of 12, he was already known as Wany. In 1994 he won his first regional contest in Puglia. From 1997 to 2000, he specialised at the "International School of Comics" in Rome. He is a link between the academic art gallery circuit and hip-hop culture and street art in Italy.
Otto Schnade	Chile	
Revert	France	
Smug	Australia	

Other Artists included: Kid Acne, Swanski, Ben Slow, Best Ever, Bonzai, Cosmo Sarsen, Dicey, Feek, GMC, Hit + Run, Maumau, Mr Wany, Mysterious Al, Pinky, Ponk, SEPR, Wow 123, Xenz, Zeus, Solo One, and Goldie

=== Who's Lenny? ===
A 16-minute long short film about See No Evil 2011, Who's Lenny?, was commissioned by the council. It was produced by Bristol-based production company Hurricane Media. The film was made using a range of techniques including wirecam technology – a first in a UK urban environment - as well as time-lapse photography and 24-hour live coverage.

See No Evil: Who's Lenny explains how once outlawed graffiti artists have now come to critical acclaim, and how one group in particular were invited to paint the courts of law in which they were once convicted for their art. The video aims to present street art as a vibrant and contemporary art form. The documentary includes interviews with some of the 72 artists involved including Inkie, Tats Cru, El Mac, Nick Walker, Shoe, Xenz, China Mike and Paris. Focusing on the See No Evil event, the film also explores how street art has a natural home in Bristol, capturing the spirit of Bristol graffiti scene.

The film went on to win Royal Television Society (RTS) Awards for Best Short Film and Best Community Media in February 2012.

== See No Evil 2012 ==
Arrangements were made by Inkie for the repainting of the street in August 2012, as part of the 2012 Cultural Olympiad accompanying the Summer Olympics and Paralympics, with support from Bristol City Council, the Arts Council and London 2012 Festival as part of the 2012 Cultural Olympiad and Bristol University. See No Evil 2012 began on 13 August when 45 selected (both local and international) artists, with 3,500 cans of spray paint and 700 litres of paint.

The event took place on Nelson Street again, a one-way bus and taxi lane known for its grey concrete walls (including the 12-storey St Lawrence House and a police station) over the course of 7 days– with the permission of the owners. Three works from the 2011 event's 72 pieces were saved by the public vote, via an internet poll allowing people to voice their opinions on preferred works, those being the suited man pouring a tin of red paint, the wolf boy, and the woman and child; painted by Nick Walker, Aryz and El Mac respectively.

It is intended that See No Evil at Nelson Street will remain Europe's largest open air street art gallery, with huge murals until the following summer. Some of the artists (including ManOne and Vyal One, FLX One and Dones and Limited Press) in the same week also created work on hoardings around the Bristol Temple Quarter Enterprise Zone.

=== List of 2012 See No Evil artists ===
Sources unless otherwise stated.

Artist and artists	From	Notes
Cheo	Bristol	Influences: John Peel's Radio 1 Hip-Hop show, break dancing, his brother's New York City skyline artwork and his local Barton Hill Youth Centre. Bio: Winner of the National Graffiti Art Championships in 1987.
KTF Crew		Collective: Mr.Riks, Haka, Lokey, Silent Hobo, Devas, Ryder, Poster, Ames, Sigh and Molar
FLX One & Dones	Bristol Based	Dones Bio: Fine Art Degree. Style: often creates photo realistic works, exploring most styles of street art. Bio: a graphic designer, he was part of the first generation on Bristol's urban art scene. See No Evil collaboration at Temple Meads: a parody of DaVinci's The Last Supper painting, featuring animals - including "papparazi mice, fat cat bankers, a pig policeman and some unsavoury religious insects, all gambling with the devil holding the atomic bomb."
Werc Alvarez	Born in Juarez, Mexico, and raised in El Paso, Texas.	See No Evil Collaboration: with Man One and Vyal One.
Andy Council	Bristol	See 2011 Entry.
Vyal One	Los Angeles	See No Evil collaboration: with Man One and Werc Alvarez at See No Evil. Style: uses psychedelic use of colours and dark old school horror themes, prefers to use graffiti themes such as letter structure, and the B-boy characters that came out of New York City.
sheOne	London based	See 2011 Entry. In 2012 his abstract whisps were painted at the bottom of Nick Walker's huge character, helping make it the largest street art mural in the UK.
Kuildoosh	West of England	Collective: Eco, Mudwig and Paris. Style: design collective described as 'Victorian England's answer to graffiti'.
Stik	Bristol based	Style: Stik's stick people are normally in a state of depression. At See No Evil his biggest work to date on Unite's Nelson House. Bio: Bristol. 18 months ago was living in St Mungo's hostel.
TCF Crew	Bristol-based	Collective: Acerone, Dicy, Feek, Xenz, Eco, Paris and Aji.
Soker	Bristol based	Bio: a Bristol-based street artist, who has produced work all over the world.
Limited Press	Bristol based	Collective: An art and design collective known for their large-scale murals.
Man One	Los Angeles	Known for his work comprising bold colourful strokes
KASHINK	Paris	See 2011 Entry.
Mr Jago	Bristol	See 2011 Entry.
Lucy McLauchlan		Style: Combines Art Deco, psychedelic and childlike themes to make pieces that are delicate and thought provoking. She uses permanent materials like Indian ink and marker pens.
L'Atlas	Paris	Style: Based on Kufi, a geometric calligraphy, converted into the Latin alphabet.
Nychos	Austrian	Style: artistic inside-out animals.
Conor Harrington	Ireland	Bio: an Irish contemporary oil painter and street artist. At See No Evil: large Renaissance oil painting style piece featuring three-storey-high soldiers (behind the church on Nelson Street). According to Harrington, the male figure is a central theme to his work, and this piece refers to the masculinity of urban culture.
CANTWO	Mainz, Germany	Style: fine lettering, CAN2 uses the Bronx style of the early 1980s
SatOne	Venezuela born, Munich based	Style: creates a large-scale combination of graphic style, illustration and abstract. At See No Evil: a frieze of Marvel-like superheroes. The work is said to address the issue of artists being treated like superheroes.
Mark Bode		Influence and Style: Son of Vaughn Bodé, the creator of Cheech Wizard the original graffiti character, he continues to advance his father's work into various mediums.
Chu	Walsall born, Bristol-based	See 2011 Entry.
M-City	Gdynia, Poland	Bio: graduated from the Department of Graphic Art at the Academy of Fine Arts in Gdańsk. Style: large scale industrial stencil scenes.
Seize	born in Paris	Style: Self-taught painter, paints large scale and colourful maps made up of elementary shapes.
Chase	from Belgium and based in Los Angeles	Bio and Style: works with landowners in Venice Beach, painting cartoon characters. At See No Evil his girl in a yellow dress leaps up a staircase that mimics the real staircase behind.
China Mike	born in Bedford, based in Bristol	See 2011 Entry.
Sickboy	Bristol	See 2011 Entry.
Mark Lyken	Glasgow, Scotland	Style: his work creates geometric, nebulae-like paintings in the Graffuturism scene. His paintings play with scale and time, inventing worlds within worlds.
ROA	Ghent, Belgium	Style: wildlife, in black and white thin paint strokes. At See No Evil: the huge fox holding onto its tail
Pixel Pancho	Turin	Style: a fusion of robotic characters and elements of the natural world. Influences: historicism, surrealism, the political painting group El Equipo Cronica, Ron English, and Takashi Murakami. At See No Evil he painted two mechanical monsters, coils twined, heads rearing.
Hannah	Bristol	Style: Painted her first street piece at See No Evil, subverting classical motifs with cheeky modern symbolism.
Inkie	London based, originally from Bristol	See 2011 Entry.

== Hear No Evil ==
Both years, alongside the live art event of See No Evil with graffiti artists at work, Hear No Evil hosted live music and DJ sets with artists from Bristol's music scene, plus graffiti workshops, food stalls, breakdancing, face painting, and pop-up galleries. For both years there were music events in the disused Westgate Building. Both years had a Hear no Evil block party on the final Saturday and in 2012 Busking day on Sunday 19 August. For 2012 the opening event was an audio-visual immersive event, "Mail, Maps & Motion", on Friday 17 August, featured a collaboration of Joanie Lemercier (from 3D projection people AntiVJ) and musicians Adrian Utley of Portishead and Will Gregory of Goldfrapp, took place at the Passenger Shed.

== Reception and future ==
Some Conservative councillors said that the exhibition was a waste of money and were unhappy the Liberal Democrat-run council had contributed towards funding it.

Bristol City Council Leader Barbara Janke said: "When the economy is suffering generally, it is important for councils to take steps like these to stimulate the city's economy. ..This daring and entrepreneurial project has acted as a catalyst for change in this once unloved part of the city centre. ..."Bristol is leading the way by promoting one aspect of the city's own unique character to a much wider audience to generate wider economic benefits."

Jonathan Jones writing in The Guardian about the 2011 event concluded that street art was dying. "Maybe there was a time when painting a wittily satirical or cheekily rude picture or comment on a wall was genuinely disruptive and shocking. That time is gone" and went on to say, "Images far too ordinary to be exhibited in art galleries are admired because they are on the street".

2012, Nelson Street business woman, Lynne Tonks, said it was "the best thing that they ever did in this street...They've increased the foot flow," with more tourists were attracted to the area, less crime and vandalism. "It's a pleasanter environment to work in and for people to come to," Ms Tonks said. "Graffiti is something that Bristol should be proud of, Banksy's put it on the map and other people are following - and it looks great."

See No Evil 2011 not only successfully rejuvenated a very run down area of Bristol but generated enough publicity to turn it into one of Bristol's biggest tourist attractions. When asked about the legacy of See No Evil, Dave Harvey from Team Love said "In terms of legacy – obviously the street itself. This street this time last year, no one came here, there was nothing on the street, it was really grey and dismal. This year council figures show tens of thousands more people are coming down here every month to look at the art."

Inkie said "The future of See No Evil is a more diverse base of art forms including photography, digital and animation with bigger music acts and better installations and street dressings. This is something we would like to take on tour to other cities across the globe. The legacy is the longstanding effect on the youth and their creativity in Bristol through the outreach projects and workshops in which we are directly inspiring the youth and showing them ways to express themselves. This will lead in turn to a bigger creative scene in Bristol for the future."

== See also ==
- Upfest, another street-art festival in Bristol that helped organise See No Evil.
- Quinta do Mocho murals, near Lisbon, Portugal.
