= Show of Strength Theatre Company =

Coordinates: 51°26′17″N 2°36′34″W

- Show of Strength logo
- Formation: 1986
- Type: Theatre Company
- Purpose: New writing, lost plays
- Headquarters: 74 Chessel Street, Bedminster, Bristol, BS3 3DN
- Region served: Bristol, South West England
- Official language: English
- Artistic Director: Sheila Hannon
- Website: Show of Strength

Show of Strength Theatre Company is a Bristol-based theatre company which has produced new and forgotten works since 1986 in a range of venues in Bristol and the South West. The company is funded by Arts Council England and Bristol City Council but also relies on individual and corporate sponsorship. They have produced over 60 plays and established several new performance venues including the Showboat pub (Horfield), the Hen and Chicken pub (Bedminster), Quakers Friars (Broadmead), the Tobacco Factory (Southville) and Paintworks (Arnos Vale). The company has received many awards for its work, including the London Weekend Television Plays on Stage award and the Guinness/Royal National Theatre Pub Theatre Award. As well as plays Show of Strength have produced numerous play readings and writing workshops. Although based in Bristol the work of the company has received regular attention from the UK national press.

== History ==
Show of Strength, Bristol

Sheila Hannon and Nick Thomas co-founded the company in Bristol in 1986, and it began as a two-handed company performing in small touring venues. In 1989 the company moved into an upstairs reception room above the Hen and Chicken pub in Bedminster. In the succeeding years they produced five seasons of work building regular and loyal audiences. Their work received growing attention, which was rewarded in 1993 with the LWT Plays on Stage award for the premiere production of A Busy Day, a lost play by the Georgian writer Fanny Burney, which later transferred to the West End. In 1994 they lost the use of that venue, but found a new home in part of the grade I listed building Quakers Friars in Broadmead where in the succeeding three years they produced new and lost work by writers ranging from Peter Nichols (Blue Murder) to Dion Boucicault (How She Loves Him). In 1996 they co-produced The Substance of Fire (Jon Robin Baitz) with the Theatre Royal, Plymouth. In 1997 they lost the use of Quakers Friars and co-produced four plays with Bristol Old Vic, which were also performed at The Talbot Inn, Mells in Somerset. The European premiere of Australian playwright Nick Enright's Good Works won the Guinness/Royal National Theatre Pub Theatre Award.

Bristol architect George Ferguson made the first floor of an abandoned tobacco factory in Southville available to Show of Strength in 1998 and the company succeeded in making this into a new theatre venue, the Tobacco Factory Theatre, for South Bristol, which it remains to this day. In three years they produced eleven play including two news works by Peter Nichols and the acclaimed The Wills' Girls by Amanda Whittington which was revived in 2003 and was also staged at the Dublin Fringe Festival.

Following a major Arts Council review in 2004, Show of Strength has grown to working with other arts agencies and venues in the South West, including The Everyman Theatre Cheltenham, The Brewhouse Theatre Taunton, The Northcott Theatre Exeter, Bristol Old Vic, Asian Arts Agency and Travelling Light Young Peoples Theatre Company.

In 2006 as part of the Brunel 200 celebrations performances of An Audience with Sarah Guppy were produced on Brunel's SS Great Britain and three new plays under the banner title Brunel and Partners were performed at Bristol Temple Meads, Bath Spa, Cheltenham, Gloucester, Plymouth and Newton Abbot railway stations. Trade It? commissioned as part of the 2007 commemoration of the Abolition of the Slave Trade in 1807 was a street performance of ten short plays in June 2008 by writers including Mustapha Matura, Catherine Johnson and Sandi Toksvig.

In 2008 Show of Strength suffered a major funding cut from Bristol City Council, but then received a temporary extension until March 2009. In February 2009 Trading Local, a partnership with the Southville Centre, produced short plays in 19 local shops in Southville and Bedminster.

== See also ==
- Culture in Bristol
