= Show of Strength =

Show of Strength may refer to:

- MDA Show of Strength, the current name of the former Jerry Lewis MDA Labor Day Telethon
- Show of Strength Theatre Company, Bristol, England
