= Inkie =

English painter

Inkie CIC
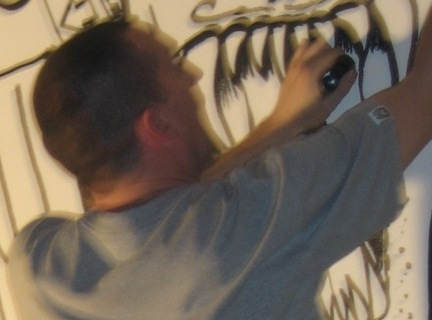
- Participating in the Secret Wars competition in 2007
- Born: Tom Bingle; 1969 or 1970 (age 55–56); Bristol, England
- Style: Street art
- Movement: Bristol underground scene; Graffiti
- Website: inkie.co.uk

Inkie is a London-based painter and street artist, originally from Clifton, Bristol. He is cited as being part of Bristol's graffiti heritage, along with Banksy, 3D and Nick Walker.

== Career ==
Inkie began working as part of Crime Incorporated Crew (also known as the "CIC" or the Crime inc.crew) in 1983, along with Felix and Joe Braun. He was the head of the many artists arrested in 1989 during "Operation Anderson", the UK's largest ever graffiti bust. He arranged 1998's Walls on Fire event with Banksy, on the site of the future At-Bristol centre. He has subsequently worked in the video game industry, including some time as head of creative design at Sega, where his work was included in Jet Set Radio. Inkie was one artist present to do live painting at the launch of Banksy's book Bristol: Home Sweet Home. Inkie has likened the time spent training as a graffiti artist to that of classical musicians.

He now teaches art and graphic design to young children and college students.

== Influences ==
Inkie's works have been described as "diverse", incorporating styles from Maya architecture, William Morris, Mouse & Kelly, Alphonse Mucha, the Arts and Crafts movement and Islamic geometry.

== Works ==
CIC painted a mural in the canteen of South Gloucestershire and Stroud College, where Inkie and Felix Braun were students. Inkie's works were featured in a 2009 exhibition at Bristol's Royal West of England Academy and he curated 2009's Ibiza street art festival, Urban in Ibiza.

He hosted a show of his works in 2010 for which 25% of the proceeds would be donated to Southmead Hospital's cochlear implant programme.

His works have included murals in buildings in the Bristol area, including a friend's restaurant in Keynsham and Clifton pub The Grapes (after being taken over by former video director Bill Butt). He has taken part in Bristol's annual Upfest, the largest free urban paint festival in Europe.

In August 2011 and 2012 Inkie was named as the organiser of a major street art event in Bristol, See No Evil, which involved painting the buildings of an entire street, turning it into Europe's largest outdoor art gallery. Nelson Street, in the city centre, was painted by a large number of international graffiti artists over a two-week period.

Between 30 January and 29 February 2013, Inkie's work was featured at Art Below's first "pop up" billboard show in America in New Orleans. For the show, billboard space used normally for advertising featured a mix of urban and contemporary art. A curated selection of 20 billboards flanked the major New Orleans Mardi Gras parade routes. Running alongside the billboard show was an exhibition of the artists original works at Gallery Orange in the French Quarter. Scenes and moments from this exhibition were screened on the Art Below web site in April 2012.
