= Upfest =

Annual street-art festival in Bristol, England

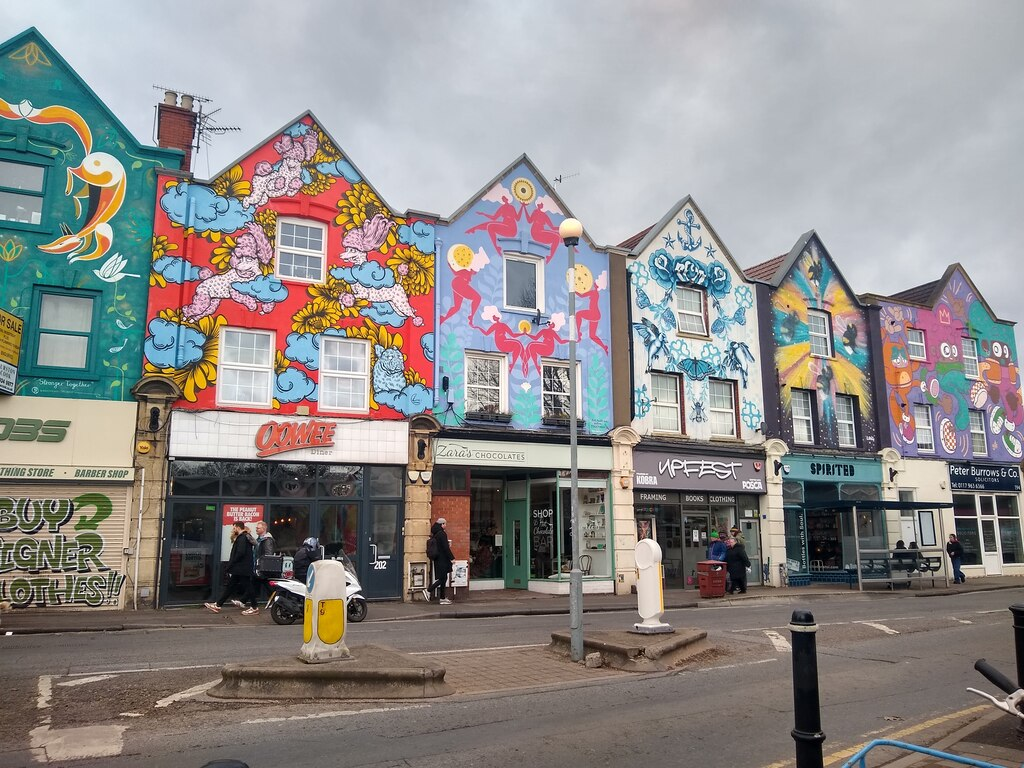
- 'The Six Sisters' mural project on North Street, Bedminster, with the festival's gallery seen on the centre-right of the image
- Status: Active
- Genre: Street art, graffiti
- Frequency: Annual (biennial since 2023)
- Locations: Bedminster and Southville, Bristol, England
- Years active: 2008–present
- Founders: Stephen Hayles and local artists
- Attendance: c. 50,000 (pre-2020 estimates)
- Area: c. 30,000 ft² painted surfaces (2015)
- Budget: ≈£250,000 (2024)
- Organiser: Upfest
- Website: www.upfest.co.uk

Upfest is a street-art and graffiti festival held in the Bedminster and Southville districts of Bristol, England. Since its founding in 2008 by Stephen Hayles, it has grown from a one-day event by twenty artists to what is described as Europe's largest street-art festival.

Upfest also curates a spin-off event called Weston Wallz in nearby Weston-super-Mare, Somerset, commissioning large-scale murals in the town since 2021.

== History ==
The festival was founded by printer and gallery owner Stephen Hayles as a not-for-profit venture to raise funds for the children's charity NACOA. By 2011 Upfest had attracted more than 250 artists and donated £15,000 to the charity.

A peak was reached in 2015, when 250 artists from 25 countries painted 30,000 ft^{2} of wall space over three days. The festival traditionally centred on North Street and the nearby Tobacco Factory; larger editions extended into Greville Smyth Park.

The 2021 edition was postponed due to the COVID-19 pandemic, and was replaced by the "75 Walls in 75 Days" project. The Weston Wallz event was also established at this point, later becoming a permanent event. In 2024 "Upfest Presents" hosted more than 100 international and UK artists over seventeen days; roughly half of the £250,000 budget was provided by Arts Council England, the remainder through sponsorships and crowdfunding.

== Format and programming ==
Upfest ordinarily combines live mural painting with music, exhibitions, panel discussions and street-art tours. Programming is curated but non-juried, and participation remains free for artists. Since 2023 the main gathering has alternated with "Upfest Presents", a two-week distributed programme across multiple Bedminster venues, introduced to curb rising infrastructure costs while retaining free public access.

=== Weston Wallz ===
Since 2021, Upfest has curated Weston Wallz. Originally launched as a modest mural trail, the event has grown into a major event in the town, delivering more than 75 permanent murals to date. The festival spans a week each July, featuring live mural painting by international artists. Locations have included seafront landmarks and historic town-centre buildings such as the RNLI Gift Shop, Oxford Corner Café, and Old Post Office Lane.

Alongside the painting programme, the festival includes the "S.M.Art Sprayjam" and workshops at the Italian Gardens, promoting engagement among young people and families. Co-creation initiatives with local youth are also supported by partner organisation Super Culture. The project is jointly backed by Weston-super-Mare Town Council, Arts Council England, and local sponsors.

== Impact and reception ==
Commentators highlight Upfest's role in establishing Bristol as ‘‘the home of British graffiti’’ and in supporting emerging street artists alongside figures such as Inkie, Jody Thomas and Thierry Noir. Local authorities credit the festival with contributing to cultural tourism and urban regeneration in BS3. Stephen Hayles received a letter from Prime Minister Theresa May in 2017 in recognition of his work as part of Upfest and its charitable contributions.

== See also ==
- See No Evil, another street-art festival held in Bristol, Europe's largest when it was held in 2011, and partly organised by Upfest staff.
