= Ashton Gate Brewery Co =

Former brewing company in Bristol, England

Ashton Gate Brewery Co Ltd
- Type: Private
- Industry: Brewing
- Founded: Bristol, UK (1865)
- Founder: Thomas Baynton
- Defunct: 1931/1932
- Fate: Acquired by Bristol Brewery Georges & Co
- Headquarters: Bristol, UK
- Products: Beer

Ashton Gate Brewery Co Ltd (also known for a time as Hardwick and Co Ltd) was a brewing company based in Bristol, UK. It was one of the first 1000 companies registered in England and Wales.

== History ==
Thomas Baynton had operated a business on North Street in Ashton Gate under the name Ashton Gate Brewery. The company was established in 1865 in order to acquire the business after Baynton's death. It was one of the first 1000 companies registered with Companies House.

The company changed its name to Hardwick and Co in 1868, reverting to Ashton Gate Brewery Co in 1883, and was listed in Kelly's Directory. In its last year of independent operation (to 1931), an ordinary dividend of 13 per cent was paid.

The company was acquired by Bristol Brewery Georges & Co in either 1931 or 1932.

=== Management ===
One former managing director was H. R. Harvey, whose son William Rhys Harvey became a director of Bristol Brewery Georges & Co.

== Ashton Gate Brewery ==
The brewery operated at Ashton Gate in Bristol. Additions to the brewery were made in 1905 by brewers' engineers George Adlam, being described architecturally by Foyle in his book Bristol (2004) as "brick and Ham stone with blind lunettes beneath shaped gables." The brewery produced porter and strong beer.
