= Bristol South Swimming Pool =

British public leisure centre

Coordinates: 51°26′32″N 2°36′03″W

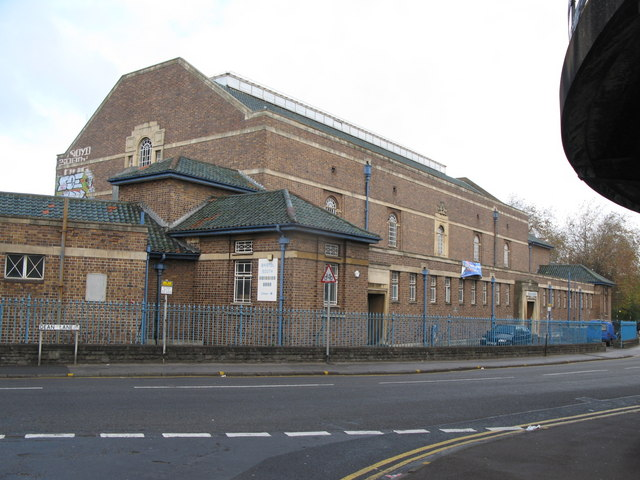
Exterior of the pool in 2007

Bristol South Swimming Pool is a swimming pool in Southville, Bristol, UK. It is operated by Everyone Active on behalf of Bristol City Council.

== History ==
The pool opened in 1931.

In 2010, the pool was featured in an episode of Sherlock.

The pool closed in November 2019 for repair works following the discovery of a leaking pipe. However, it remained closed for longer than anticipated as further repairs were required and work was slowed due to the COVID-19 pandemic and vandalism. It reopened in July 2021.

== Facilities ==
The pool is 30.5 metres (100 feet) long and 10 metres (33 feet) wide. The shallow end is 1.2 metres (3.9 feet) deep while the deep end is 2.5 metres (8.2 feet) deep. The building is Grade II listed.
