= St Lawrence House =

Residential building in Bristol, England

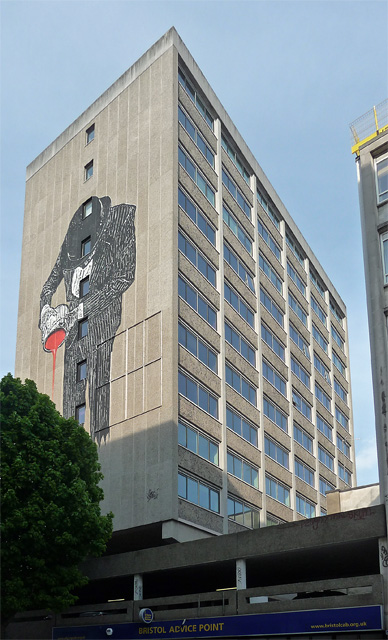
- Interactive map of the St Lawrence House area

General information
- Status: Completed
- Type: Offices (1967–2013) student accommodation (2015–)
- Architectural style: Modernist
- Location: 29–31 Broad Street, Bristol, England
- Coordinates: 51.455605°N 2.595123°W
- Construction started: 1964
- Completed: 1967
- Renovated: 1998 (window and façade renewal); 2015 (conversion to student accommodation)
- Owner: Far East Orchard

Height
- Height: 44 m

Technical details
- Floor count: 12
- Floor area: 44,460 m²

Design and construction
- Architecture firm: Alec French & Partners

St Lawrence House is a 12-storey residential tower on Broad Street in central Bristol, England. Designed by Alec French & Partners and completed in 1967, it was one of the first post-war office blocks permitted directly on the line of the medieval city wall. The building was refurbished several times before being converted into purpose-built student accommodation in 2015.

== History ==
=== Planning and construction (1964–1967) ===
Planning consent for a speculative office tower on the Broad Street frontage was granted in 1964, three years before publication of Bristol City Council's 1966 Policy Report on plot ratios. The scheme required cutting through the surviving stretch of the medieval city wall and was built over a service road to maintain vehicular access behind the site. Completed in 1967, the tower rose immediately beside the 14th-century gateway Church of St John the Baptist, dwarfing its spire and altering long views down Broad Street and St Michael's Hill. Contemporary observers regarded the tower as an object lesson in overdevelopment within Bristol's medieval centre. Five years later the same architects produced the adjacent but more conservation-minded St John's Court (1972).

=== Ownership changes and refurbishment (1993–1999) ===
McKay Securities sold St Lawrence House in 1993 for £5.74 million to Berkeley Eastoak Investments, representing a yield just under 10 percent. The new owner undertook a £1 million refurbishment completed in October 1998, replacing all windows and upgrading several floors for new tenants. Academic analysis of Bristol's conservation areas in the same period noted minor façade remodelling, including alterations to the Broad Street entrance, as part of a wider trend to re-clad 1950s and 1960s office blocks in search of higher rents.

=== Conversion to student accommodation (2014–2015) ===
In 2015 Crosslane Group, trading as Prime Student Living, obtained permission to convert the empty office tower into 166 student studios. The scheme, completed for the 2015–16 academic year, advertised amenities such as an on-site gym, 32-inch televisions and parcel lockers, with weekly rents beginning at £165.

=== Subsequent acquisition (2019) ===
In March 2019 Singapore-based Far East Orchard bought St Lawrence House as part of a wider deal totalling US$72.3 million. The purchase brought the company's UK portfolio to almost 2,100 student beds across eight assets.

== Architecture ==
St Lawrence House is a tower of reinforced-concrete frame construction faced in grey concrete panels. Although slightly set back behind a shallow forecourt, its height and bulk nonetheless are visible around the neighbouring medieval gateway church, a relationship contemporary critics described as "drab" and "dreary".

=== Public art ===
As part of the See No Evil street art festival held in the Nelson Street area, St Lawrence House was one of many buildings to have served as a canvas for murals. The Vandal (also known as Painting the Town Red) is a 20-metre-tall stencil of a bowler-hatted man tipping a bucket of red paint, executed on the western façade of St Lawrence House by Nick Walker. Polish artist M-City (Mariusz Waras) covered the tower's stair core with an untitled, multi-panel stencil depicting cranes and industrial machinery, completed in 55 plates over 22 hours for the second See No Evil in 2012. The Duel of Bristol by Conor Harrington is another mural, depicting two men in duelling with rapiers, located on the wall of 28 Broad Street adjacent to St Lawrence House.

== See also ==
- List of tallest buildings and structures in Bristol
