= Ashton Gate, Bristol =

Coordinates: 51.4406°N 2.61905°W

Ashton Gate
- Location within Bristol
- OS grid reference: ST572713
- Unitary authority: Bristol
- Region: South West
- Country: England
- Sovereign state: United Kingdom
- Post town: BRISTOL
- Postcode district: BS3
- Dialling code: 0117
- Police: Avon and Somerset
- Fire: Avon
- Ambulance: South Western
- UK Parliament: Bristol South

Ashton Gate is a suburb of Bristol, United Kingdom, in the Southville ward of Bristol City Council. A toll house at the western end of North Street still survives and indicates the origin of the area's name as a gate on the road to Ashton (now known as Long Ashton). Once part of the estate of the Smyth family of Ashton Court, the area had ironworks and collieries in the nineteenth century, also a tobacco factory and a brewery. There is still some manufacturing industry and retail parks and in 2003 the Bristol Beer Factory recommenced brewing in the former brewery site. Ashton Gate railway station closed in 1964.

In 1816, Scottish engineer John McAdam built the first 'macadam' stretch of road on Marsh Road in Ashton Gate.

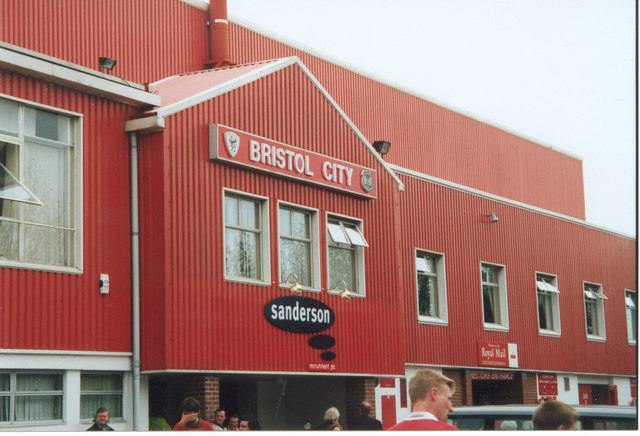
Ashton Gate, Bristol

Major attractions in the area include Ashton Gate stadium, the home of professional sports teams Bristol Bears (rugby union) and Bristol City (football), the shopping and leisure facilities of North Street, the Tobacco Factory theatre. Ashton Gate primary school serves the local preteen population.

Whitemead House multi-storey council flats on Duckmoor Road, which overlook the Ashton Gate stadium, are notable for being the exterior filming location of the tower block where Delboy and Rodney lived in the BBC sitcom Only Fools and Horses; these flats were used as their home's exterior after 1988.

== Nearby places ==
- Bedminster
- Bower Ashton
- Hotwells
- Ashton Vale
