= Southville, Bristol =

Area of Bristol, England

Coordinates: 51.4450°N 2.6003°W

Southville
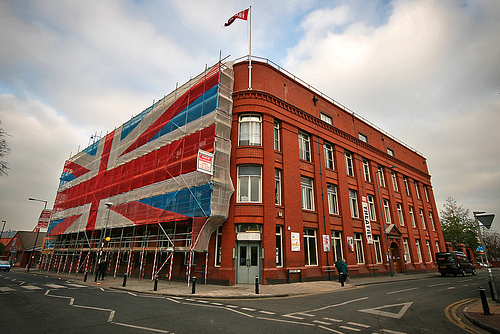
- The Tobacco Factory on Raleigh Road during cleaning work which saw a Union Jack flag covering scaffolding

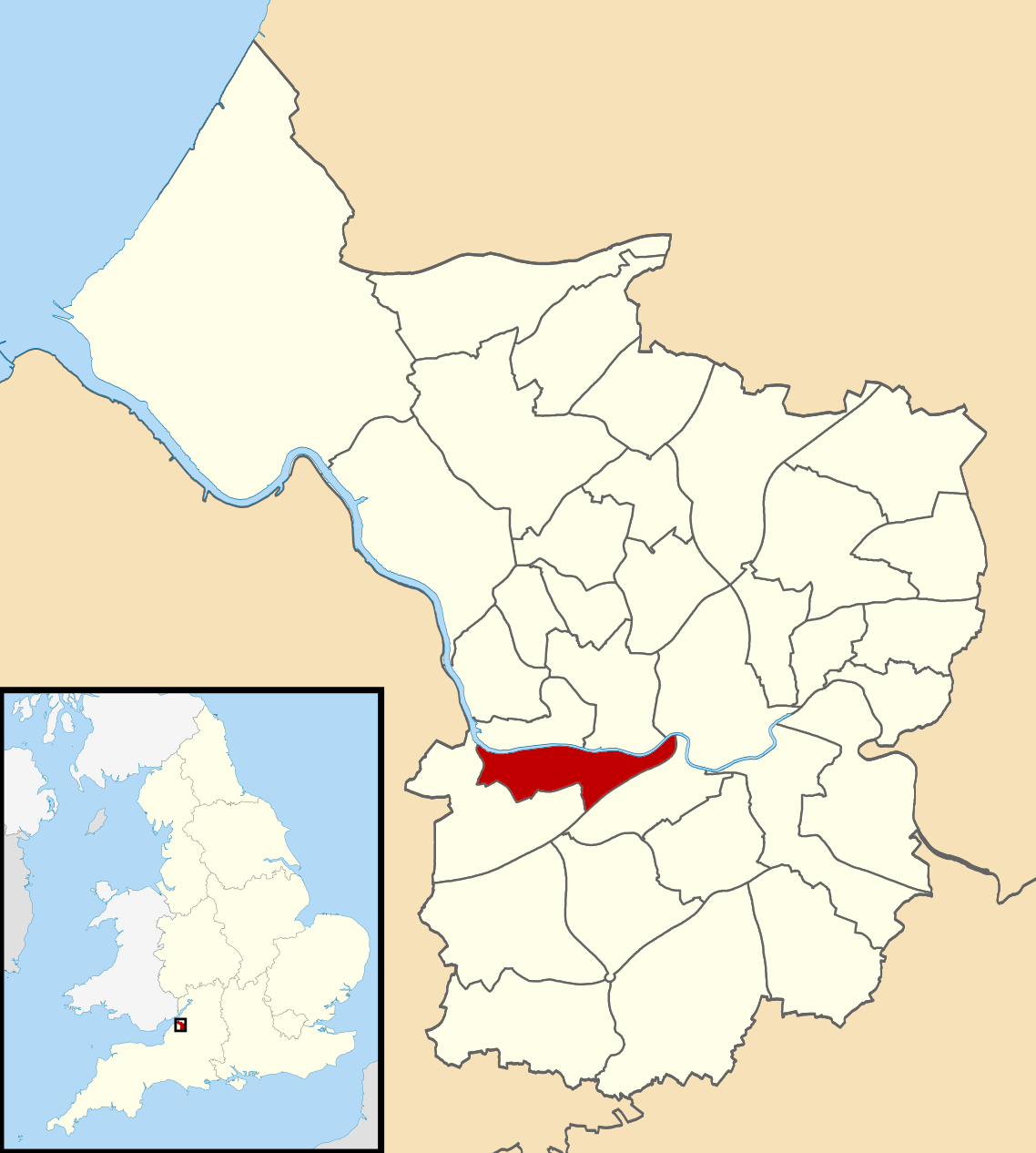
- Boundaries of the city council ward since 2016
- Population: 12,543 (2011.Ward)
- OS grid reference: ST583719
- Unitary authority: Bristol
- Ceremonial county: Bristol
- Region: South West
- Country: England
- Sovereign state: United Kingdom
- Post town: BRISTOL
- Postcode district: BS3
- Dialling code: 0117
- Police: Avon and Somerset
- Fire: Avon
- Ambulance: South Western
- UK Parliament: Bristol South

Southville is an inner city neighbourhood and council ward of Bristol, England, on the south bank of the River Avon northwest of Bedminster. Built mainly between the 1880s and the First World War for workers in local industries, it mixes Victorian terraces with post-bombing infill and recent developments. A late-1990s upswing in property prices brought cafés, bars, and the Tobacco Factory Theatre. Southville, along with Bedminster, hosts the annual Upfest graffiti festival.

== History ==
Most of the area's houses were built in the late 19th and early 20th centuries for workers in the Bristol coal mining industry or the tobacco factories of W. D. & H. O. Wills, homes of the eponymous "Wills Girls". The world headquarters of Imperial Tobacco, the world's fourth largest international tobacco company, used to be here, but moved to Ashton. Southville was also a centre for the tanning industry.

The area was bombed in the second world war, with many streets losing one or more houses. Southville was the unintended target of the many short-falling bombs aimed at the adjoining dock facilities and traffic. The subsequent post-war rebuilding is noticeable on many streets, where the generic style of house building changes to modern construction. Infilling of wartime damage is still continuing. The house price boom of the early 21st century has seen new builds on existing vacant sites and on bombed sites which had been previously used for other activities such as pre-fabricated garages and car sales lots.

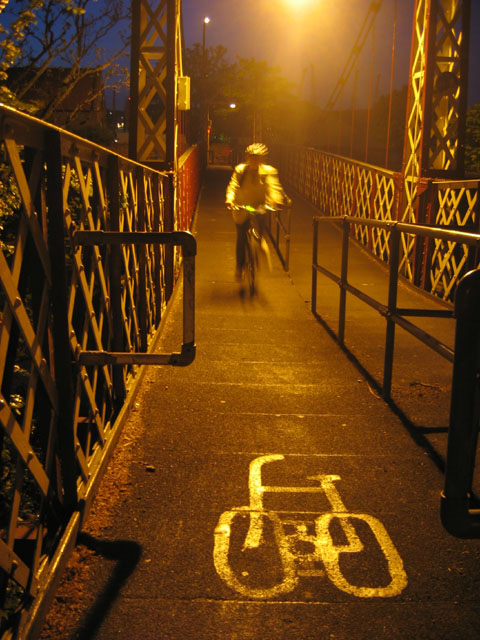
Gaol Ferry Bridge is a busy commuter route for cyclists and pedestrians.

The area has been gentrified since the late 1990s, accompanying the national rise in house prices. It has been jokingly referred to as Lower Clifton, a reference to a more prosperous area of the city. New bars and restaurants and the Tobacco Factory theatre attract visitors to the area, while the Southville Community Centre and Southville School have become the central features of a vibrant community atmosphere. There are many artists living in the area; during the annual Arts Trail which ended in 2018, they opened their houses to the public to show and sell their work.

== Parks and amenities ==
Dame Emily Park, on the site of the old Dean Lane coal pit head, is celebrated for its popular skateboard park and the vivid graffiti, the latter regularly updated by a variety of artists on a weekly basis. Greville Smyth Park is the largest local park and is popular for sports, families and dog walkers. Bristol South Swimming Pool, a grade II listed building, is in the south of Dame Emily Park. Once a year you can look round the old Slipper Baths here on Bristol Open Doors. Southville Community Development Association (SCDA) is a local community-led organisation that supports many local projects and also runs the Southville Centre - a community centre, café, nursery, after-school club and older people's Monday club.

== Governance ==
Southville is also the name of a council ward which includes the northern part of Bedminster, Ashton Gate and Bower Ashton Boundaries recently amended. Politically, Southville ward has traditionally returned Labour councillors to Bristol City Council, though in 2006 the Green Party candidate Charlie Bolton became the first Green Councillor in Bristol, with a narrow majority of seven votes. In 2015, two Green councillors were elected in Southville.

Southville forms a part of the Bristol South parliamentary constituency, currently represented by Karin Smyth.
