= Quinta do Mocho murals =

Street art near Lisbon

The Quinta do Mocho murals are a public art project in a housing estate in Sacavém, north east of Lisbon, Portugal. The project was initiated in 2014 and as of 2018 consisted of 94 large scale murals on buildings.

The Quinta do Mocho social housing project, consisting of four-story buildings, was built in the 1990s to house 3,000 people, mostly from former Portuguese colonies in Africa—Cape Verde, Guinea and Angola. Social exclusion, high unemployment and poor housing standards contributed to the area having high crime rates and various social problems. In order to improve the district's image, in 2014 local officials invited Portuguese and foreign artists to paint murals on its buildings. The municipality has since stopped organising the project, however residents now maintain it and offer guided tours to visitors. According to local officials, since the murals were painted, a bus line now serves the area, cultural events have multiplied, and the crime rate has fallen.

== Gallery ==
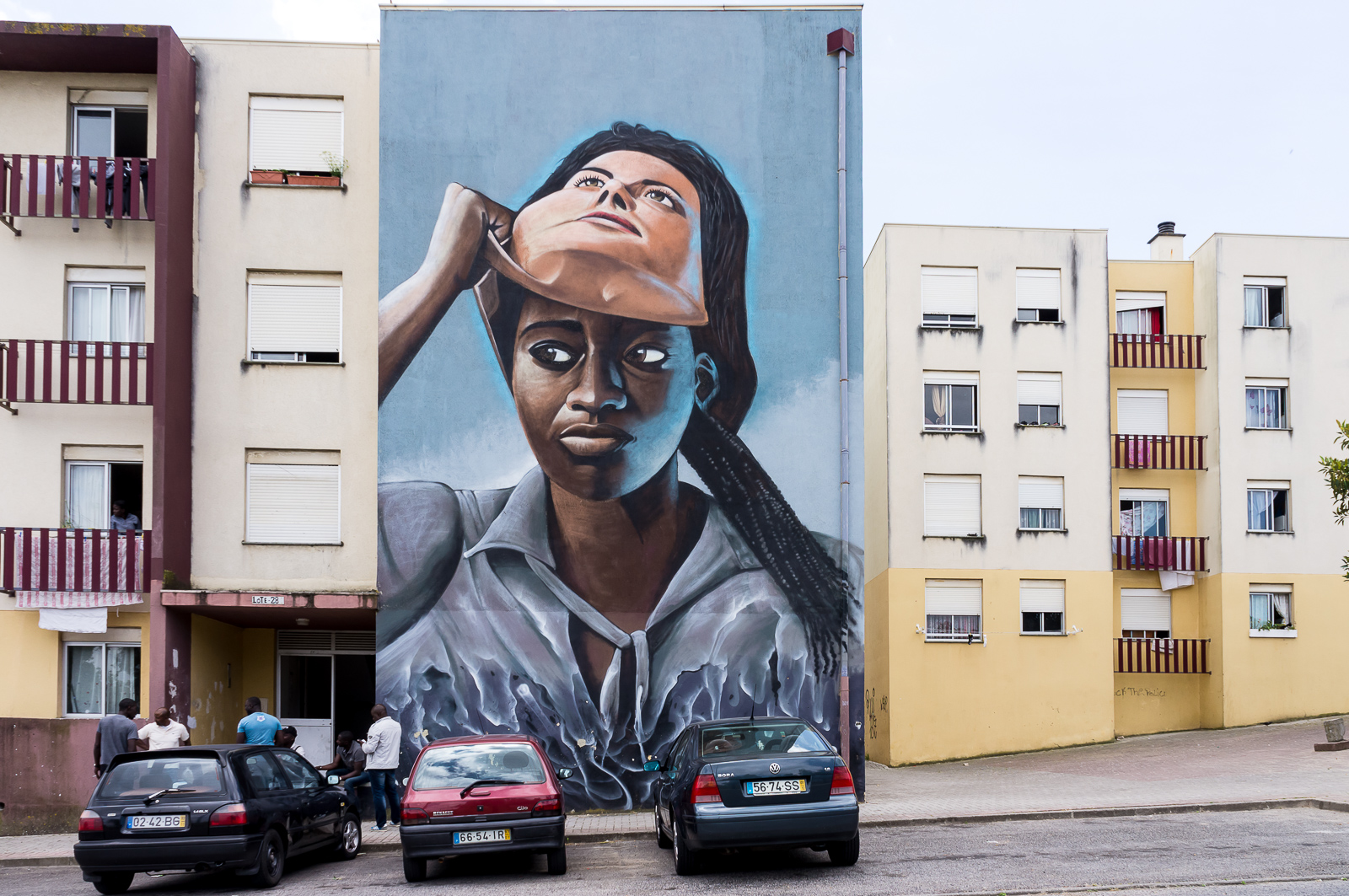
Mask artwork by Nomen

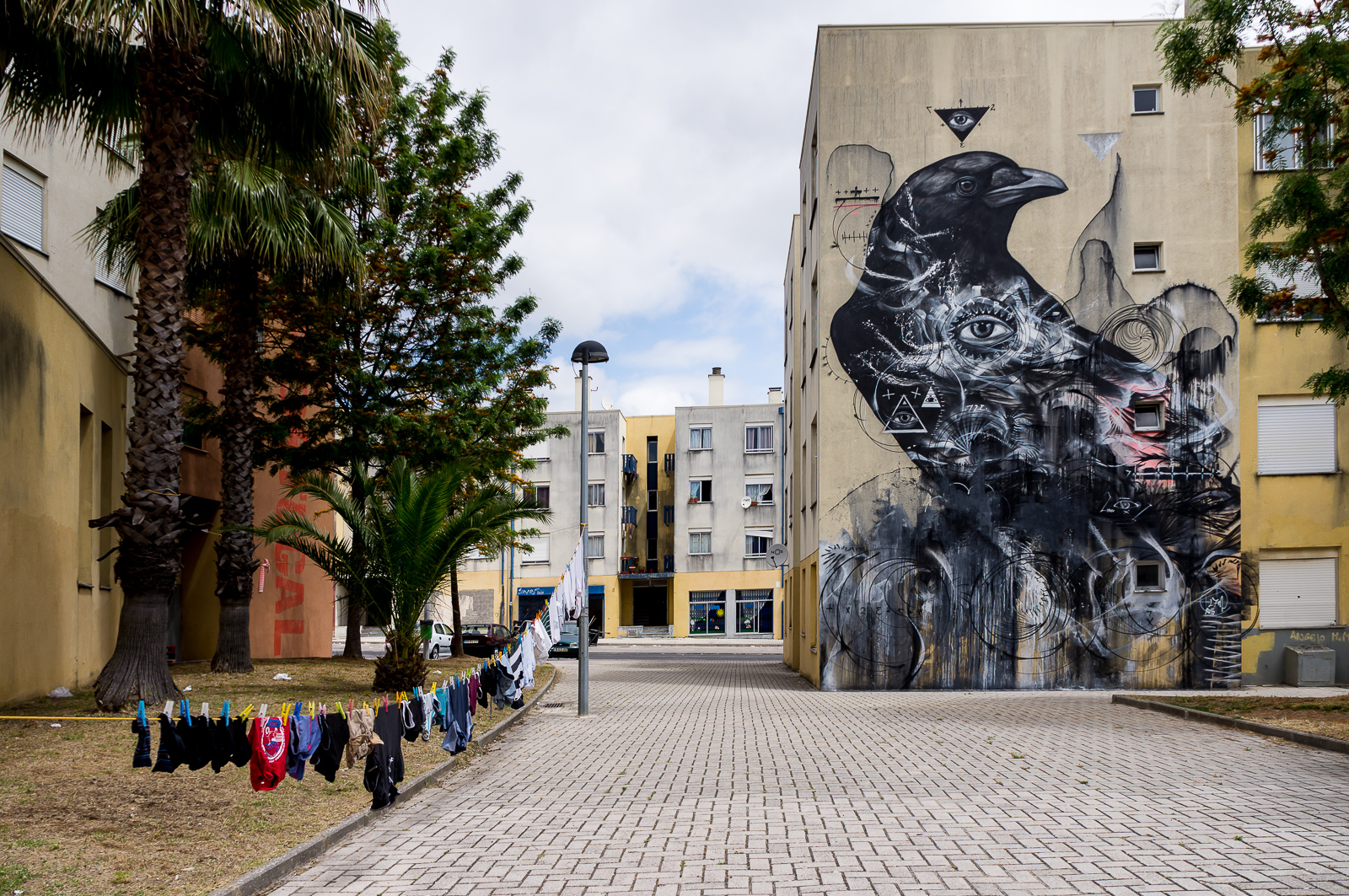

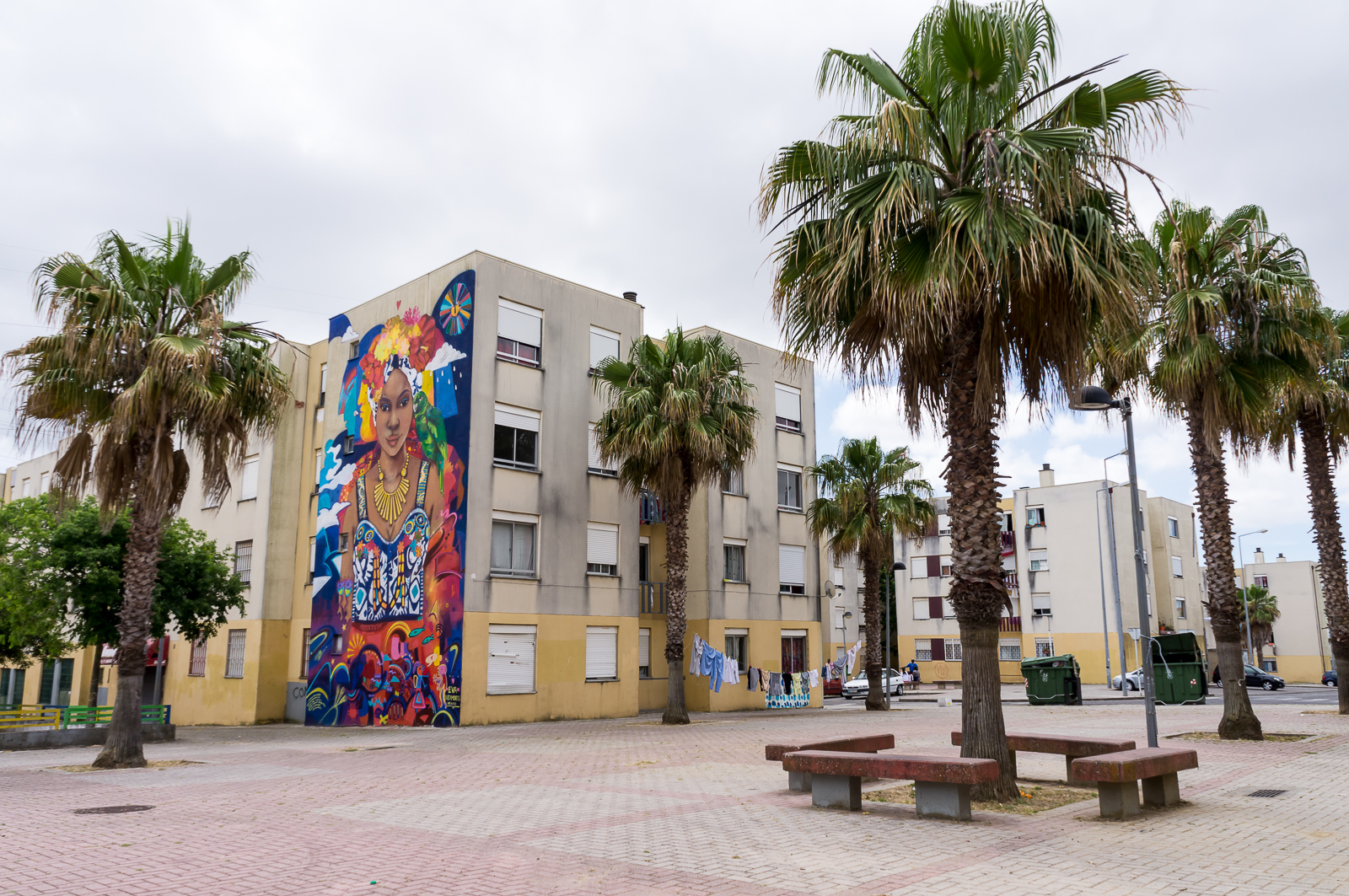

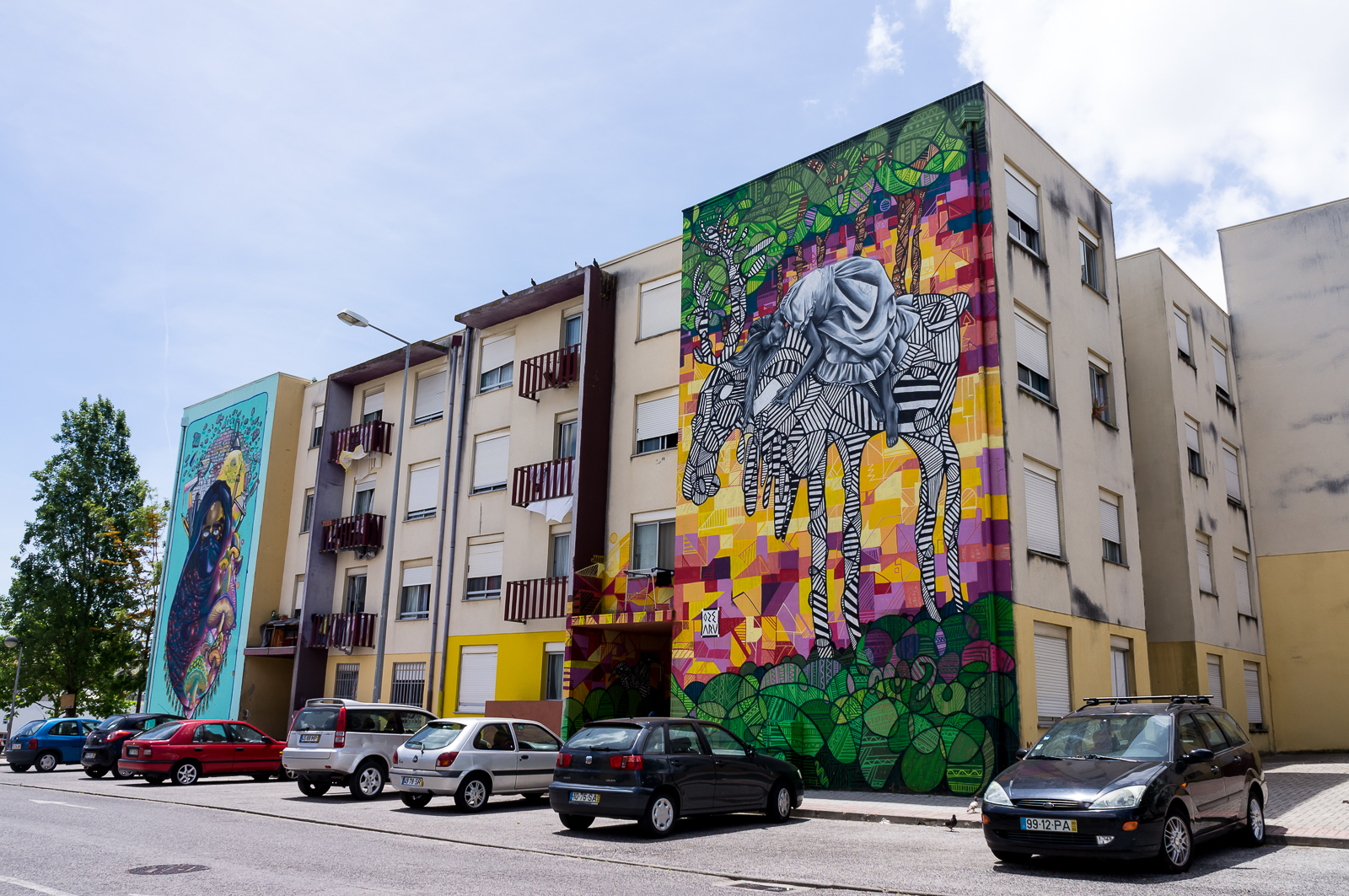

== See also ==
- See No Evil (artwork), a collection of murals on buildings in Bristol, UK
