= Greville Smyth Park =

Public park in Bristol, England

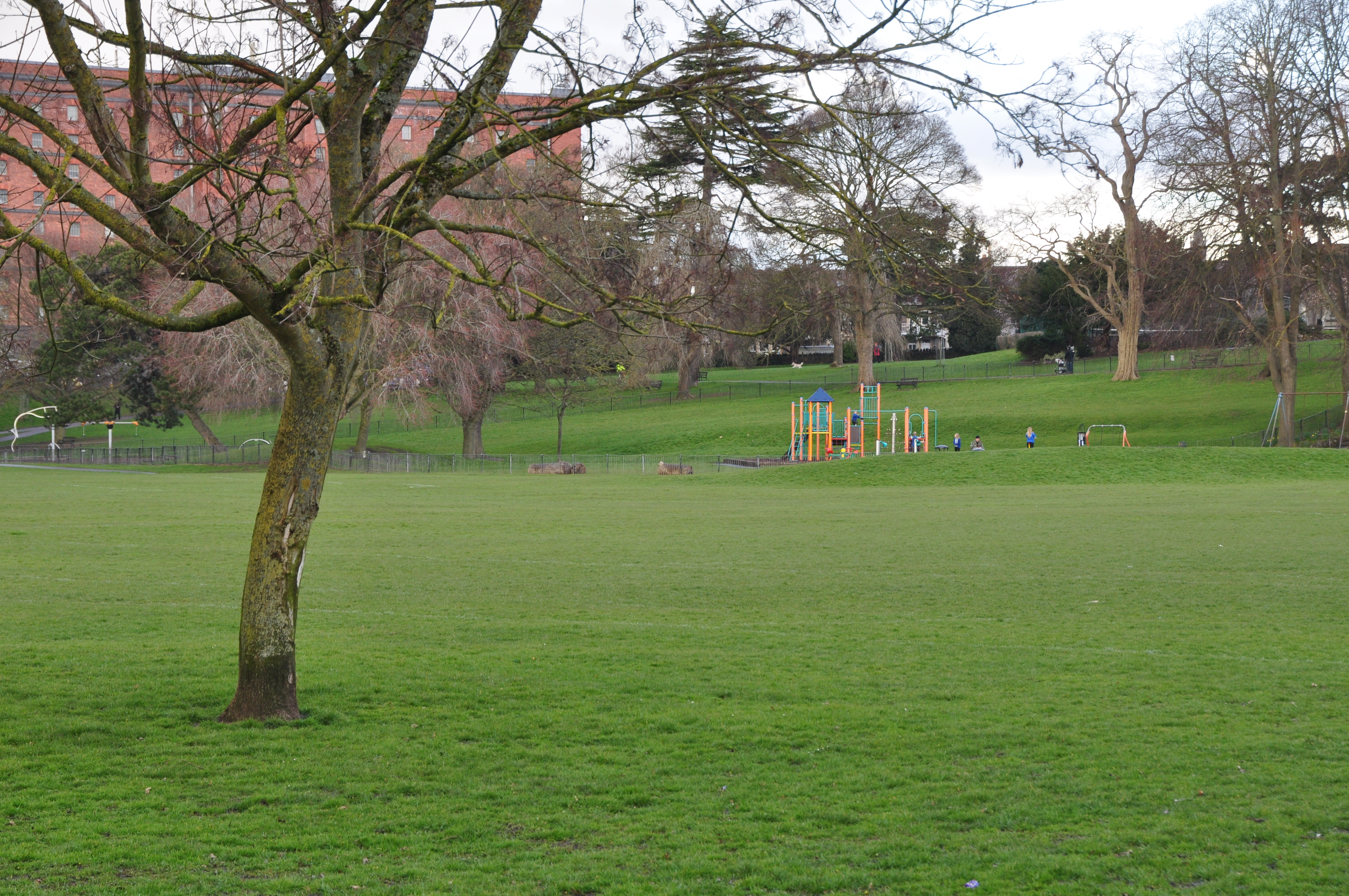
- Interactive map of Greville Smyth Park
- Type: Urban park
- Location: Ashton Gate, Bristol, England
- Coordinates: 51.4427°N 2.6208°W
- Area: 25.5 acres (10.3 ha)
- Created: 1883
- Operated by: Bristol City Council, Friends of Greville Smyth Park
- Status: All year
- Website: Bristol City Council – Greville Smyth Park

Greville Smyth Park is a late-Victorian public park in the Ashton Gate area of Bristol, England. Covering roughly 25.5 acres (10.3 ha) beside the River Avon, it provides formal sports pitches, a bowling green, children's play spaces and a small nature garden. The park is managed by Bristol City Council in partnership with the community group Friends of Greville Smyth Park (FROGS).

== History ==
=== Origins ===
In 1881, Sir John Greville Smyth of the neighbouring Ashton Court estate gifted 21.5 acres (8.7 ha) of meadowland to the city "for the health and recreation of the inhabitants of Bedminster". Laid out by the council in 1883, the ground was first called The People's Park, though locals also used the name Ashton Park. Following the death of Sir John Greville Smyth in 1901, Lady Emily Greville Smyth added a further 4 acres (1.6 ha) on 23 June 1902, requesting that the site thereafter bear the family name. The council accepted, officially adopting the title Greville Smyth Park.

=== Early twentieth century ===
By the Edwardian era the park featured a bandstand, an open-air swimming bath, formal planting and iron railings. A timber bowls pavilion soon followed and was replaced in the 1930s by the present clubhouse and changing rooms.

=== Post-war changes ===
Mid-century highway schemes along Frayne Road and Clift House Road reduced the park's footprint and broke historic views towards Ashton Court. Many original structures were later lost, but the axial avenues and original Victorian layout remain evident.

== Amenities ==
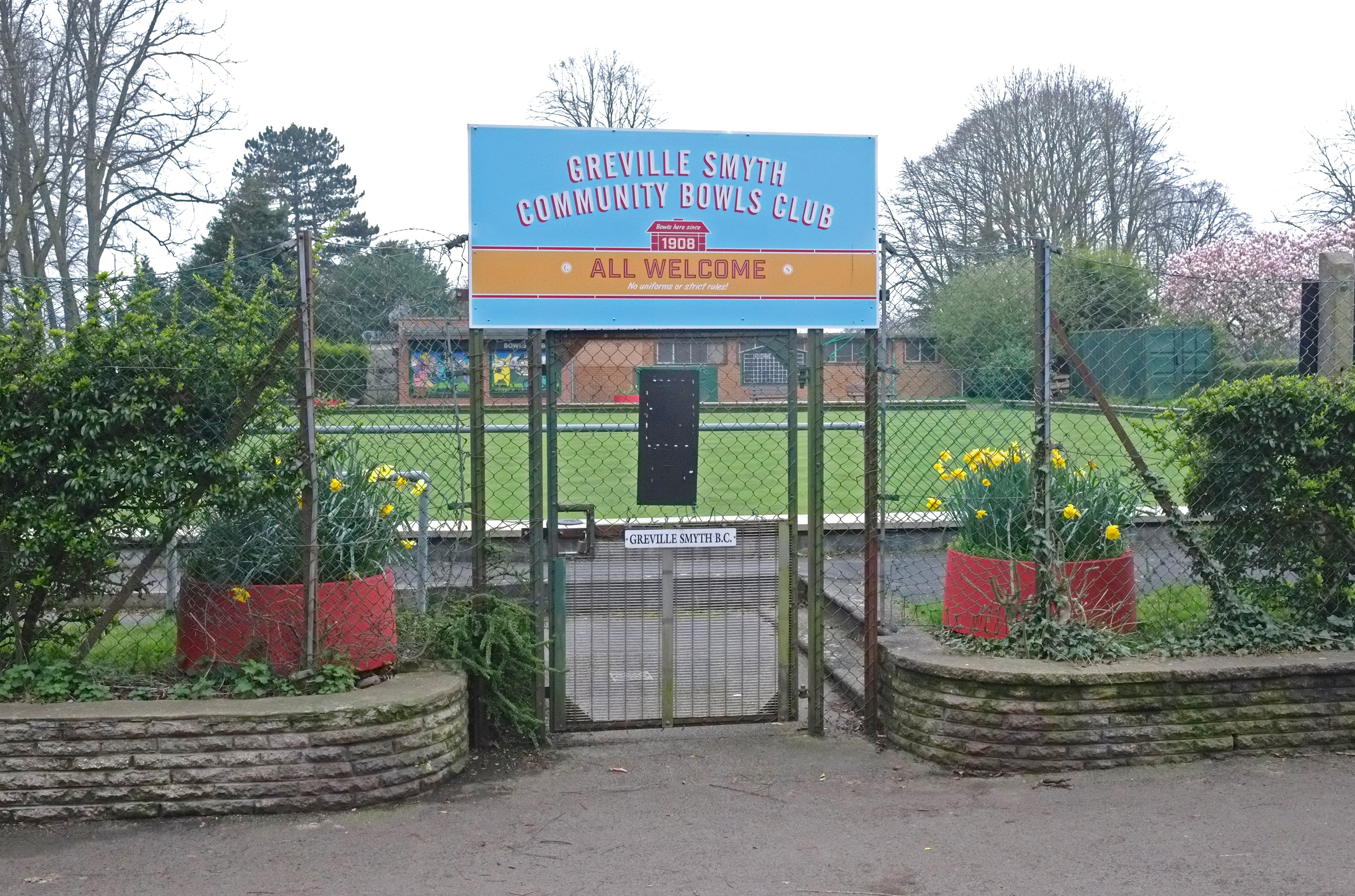
Greville Smyth Community Bowls Club

Greville Smyth Park retains a strong sporting focus. On the western lawns three full-size grass football pitches are marked out during the season, while to the south-east two hardcourts provide public tennis managed by the Greville Smyth Tennis Club. Adjacent to these courts stands a six-rink bowling green, built to county standard and served by the 1930s pavilion and changing block.

Provision for younger visitors is concentrated near the central path. A fenced playground equipped with modern climbing frames and swings sits alongside a lawn marked for sports. Immediately north is a covered youth shelter, installed in 2005 with funding from the Rotary Club of Bristol South, which functions as an informal meeting point and vantage over the main lawns.

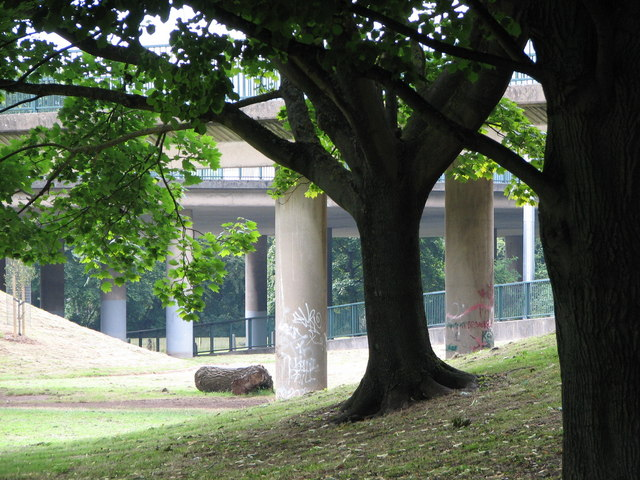
The park's network of paths allows for traversal below the A3029 and A370.

Ecological interest centres on the park's northern edge, where a wildlife pond supports emergent vegetation and invertebrate life characteristic of urban wetland fragments. Adjoining the pond, Jade's Garden was established in 2020 as a memorial to local resident Jade Collins; the area incorporates native planting, a large insect hotel and seating intended for outdoor learning and quiet reflection. Footpaths follow a late-Victorian layout dominated by dual avenues of mature lime and horse-chestnut trees, and link to pedestrian access below Brunel Way and into the adjacent Ashton Meadow and Ashton Avenue Bridge.

== Events ==
Recreational activities in the park have included outdoor cinema, runs and the South Bristol Arts Trail. In 2021 the park hosted the two-day Sequences electronic-music festival, also known as Greville Smyth Live, under a one-off licence capped at 8,000 attendees per day and limited to 72 dB. The event sparked local debate about noise management in residential parks. In 2024 the Upfest street-art festival, the largest in Europe, extended its exhibition area into the park for the first time.

== Management ==
FROGS, founded in 2003, collaborates with Bristol City Council on maintenance, habitat projects and fundraising for new facilities. Volunteer-led events include litter picks, tree planting and seasonal fairs.

== See also ==
- Parks of Bristol
