= Peter Nichols (playwright) =

English playwright (1927–2019)

Peter Richard Nichols CBE FRSL
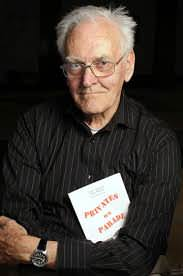
- Born: 31 July 1927; Bristol, England
- Died: 7 September 2019 (aged 92); Oxford, England
- Occupations: Playwright, screenwriter, director, journalist

Peter Richard Nichols (31 July 1927 – 7 September 2019) was an English playwright, screenwriter, director and journalist.

== Life and career ==
Born in Bristol, he was educated at Bristol Grammar School, and served his compulsory National Service as a clerk in Calcutta and later in the British Army's Combined Services Entertainment Unit in Singapore where he entertained the troops alongside John Schlesinger, Stanley Baxter, Peter Vaughan and Kenneth Williams, before going on to study acting at the Bristol Old Vic Theatre School. He later claimed to have studied acting because there were no dedicated courses for playwrights. While working as a teacher, he began to write television plays that achieved notice. His first play for the stage was The Hooded Terror, part of a season of new plays at the Little Theatre in Bristol. He later wrote A Day in the Death of Joe Egg for the stage. An early film script was Catch Us If You Can directed by John Boorman.

A Day in the Death of Joe Egg is a one-set drama in music hall style. The National Health is a fantasy farce, also interrupted by vaudeville. Privates on Parade is a musical comedy, partly inspired by Nichols's own experiences in the Combined Services Entertainments Unit. Poppy takes the form of a Christmas pantomime.

Despite the comic style, Nichols's plays deal with the most serious of themes. In A Day in the Death of Joe Egg the burden of raising a hopelessly handicapped child shatters a couple's marriage. The patients of The National Health suffer and die, as do the singing soldiers of Privates on Parade. In Poppy, a pantomime take on the Chinese Opium Wars, Dick Whittington's girlfriend becomes a drug addict. Passion Play (known as Passion in the United States) focuses on adultery and betrayal. In Blue Murder, a comic satire about play censorship, a constable investigates a death.

Nichols is often considered an especially autobiographical playwright, and chronicled much of the background to his plays in his published autobiography and diaries. Joe Egg is based on Nichols's own experiences of raising a handicapped child, The National Health draws on a hospital stay of his own, while Privates on Parade draws on his own military experiences.

Nichols was appointed Commander of the Order of the British Empire (CBE) in the 2018 New Year Honours for services to drama.

He died on 7 September 2019 in Oxford, survived by his wife Thelma and three children.

== Plays ==
His plays include:

- Promenade, an original play for television (Granada Television, 1959)
- Ben Spray, an original play for television (Granada Television, 1960)
- The Hooded Terror (Rehearsed Reading) (Little Theatre, Bristol, 1964)
- A Day in the Death of Joe Egg (Citizens Theatre, Glasgow, 1967)
- The Gorge, a play in The Wednesday Play series (BBC, 1968)
- The National Health (National Theatre Company at the Old Vic, 1969)
- Forget-me-not Lane (Greenwich Theatre, 1971)
- Chez Nous (Globe Theatre, 1974)
- Harding's Luck (Greenwich Theatre, 1974)
- The Freeway (National Theatre Company at The Old Vic, 1976)
- Privates on Parade (Royal Shakespeare Company at the Aldwych Theatre, 1977)
- Born in the Gardens (Bristol Old Vic, 1970; Globe Theatre, London, 1980)
- Passion Play (Royal Shakespeare Company at the Aldwych Theatre 1981; Adelphi, London, 1982)
- Poppy (Royal Shakespeare Company at the Barbican Theatre, 1982)
- A Piece of My Mind (Nuffield Theatre, Southampton, 1987; Apollo London, London, 1987)
- Blue Murder (Show of Strength Theatre Company, Bristol, 1995)
- So Long Life (Show of Strength Theatre Company, Bristol, 2000)
- Nicholodeon (Show of Strength Theatre Company, Bristol, 2000)
- Lingua Franca (Finborough Theatre, London, 2010)

== Books ==
- Feeling You're Behind, an autobiography by Peter Nichols (Weidenfeld & Nicolson, 1984) ISBN 0-297-78392-0

'Whatever interest my life may have had must have been exhausted. Yet there were better reasons than vanity – I needed the advance the publishers offered, which was far more generous than any given to me for a play; the theatre itself, once so alluring, now seemed past its best, the wrinkles showing, the kisses dry and dutiful; it would be a bitter pleasure to describe my disenchantment and blame the people who'd done me down; and if I didn't write a book about me, it was clear no one else would." Peter Nichols's preface, page xi.

- Peter Nichols: Diaries 1969–1977 by Peter Nichols (Nick Hern Books, 2000) ISBN 1-85459-474-5

"Did you know that Maggie Smith once accused Laurence Olivier of having "a tin ear and two left feet"? That's one of many enjoyably acerbic snippets in Peter Nichols' Diaries 1969–77, a period that stretches from the composition of his The National Health to the conception of his masterpiece, Passion Play....Nichols tends to be touchy, crusty, disappointed with himself....yet wonderfully observant, honest and likeable." Benedict Nightingale, The Times 13 December 2000.

== Sources ==
- Theatre Record and its annual indexes
- London Stage in the 20th Century by Robert Tanitch, Haus Books (2007) ISBN 978-1-904950-74-5
- The National: The Theatre and its work 1963–1997 by Simon Callow, Nick Hern Books (1997) ISBN 1-85459-323-4
