= Nick Walker (artist) =

British graffiti artist (born 1969)

- Born: 1969 (age 56–57)
- Known for: Graffiti, Street art, Bristol underground scene

Nick Walker (born 1969) is a British graffiti artist originating from Bristol, England. His paintings often feature a bowler-hatted gentleman 'vandal'.

He is credited with being part of the stencil graffiti movement that Robert Del Naja started in the 1980s, which was also an influence on Banksy.

Walker recreated the graffiti'd streets of New York City for Stanley Kubrick's 1999 film, Eyes Wide Shut. His work was included in a video by The Black Eyed Peas.

In 2006 a spray painted work of Walker's titled "Moona Lisa" sold for an unexpected £54,000 at Bonhams in London. At a solo exhibition at London's Black Rat Gallery in 2008, £750,000 worth of art was sold, with dozens of people camping outside the gallery overnight.

Walker was a main participant in the 2011 See No Evil event in Bristol, where he painted "perhaps the most striking piece at the event", one of his bowler-hatted gentlemen on the side of St Lawrence House on Nelson Street.

Walker was the first artist-in-residence of the Quin Arts program at the Quin Hotel in New York City. Walker created 15 original pieces on-site for the Quin's permanent collection during his residency in 2013, shortly following the hotel's opening. In February 2016, Walker revisited the Quin to show both historic images, as well as a new vocabulary of abstraction. This solo exhibit, curated by DK Johnston, presented 25 original works and opened the hotel's Quin Arts program for the 2016 season. In November 2016, Walker joined a cohort of fellow former Quin Arts artists-in-residence in using a D’Angelico Guitar as their “canvas,” for an artist salon. His design featured curvilinear numbers resembling musical notes.

Walker still lives in Bristol.

== Notable works ==
- Moona Lisa - painting of the Mona Lisa showing her bottom. Sold in 2006.
- The Morning After New York - painted in 2008 in East Village, New York. The building was threatened with demolition in 2011.
- Pope - painted on a ticket hut in London for the pontiff's visit in 2010.

== Publication ==
- A Sequence of Events. Drago, 2009. ISBN 9788888493466
