= Andy Council =

- Education: Arts University Oxford
- Known for: Graffiti, Street artist , Bristol underground scene
- Website: andycouncil.co.uk

Andy Council is an illustrator and graffiti artist from Bristol, UK. Dinosaurs combined with architecture are a common theme of his designs.

Council was educated at Arts University Bournemouth where he studied Animation.

He has produced work for Blender magazine, Russian design magazine Interni and The Guardian newspaper.

In June 2011 Council and artist Luke Palmer created a centerpiece painting for Bristol's new museum, M-Shed. It consisted of a colourful graphic dinosaur made of prominent Bristol buildings, poised over the city skyline.
