= George Ferguson (politician) =

British politician and former architect (born 1947)

George Ferguson CBE PPRIBA RWA
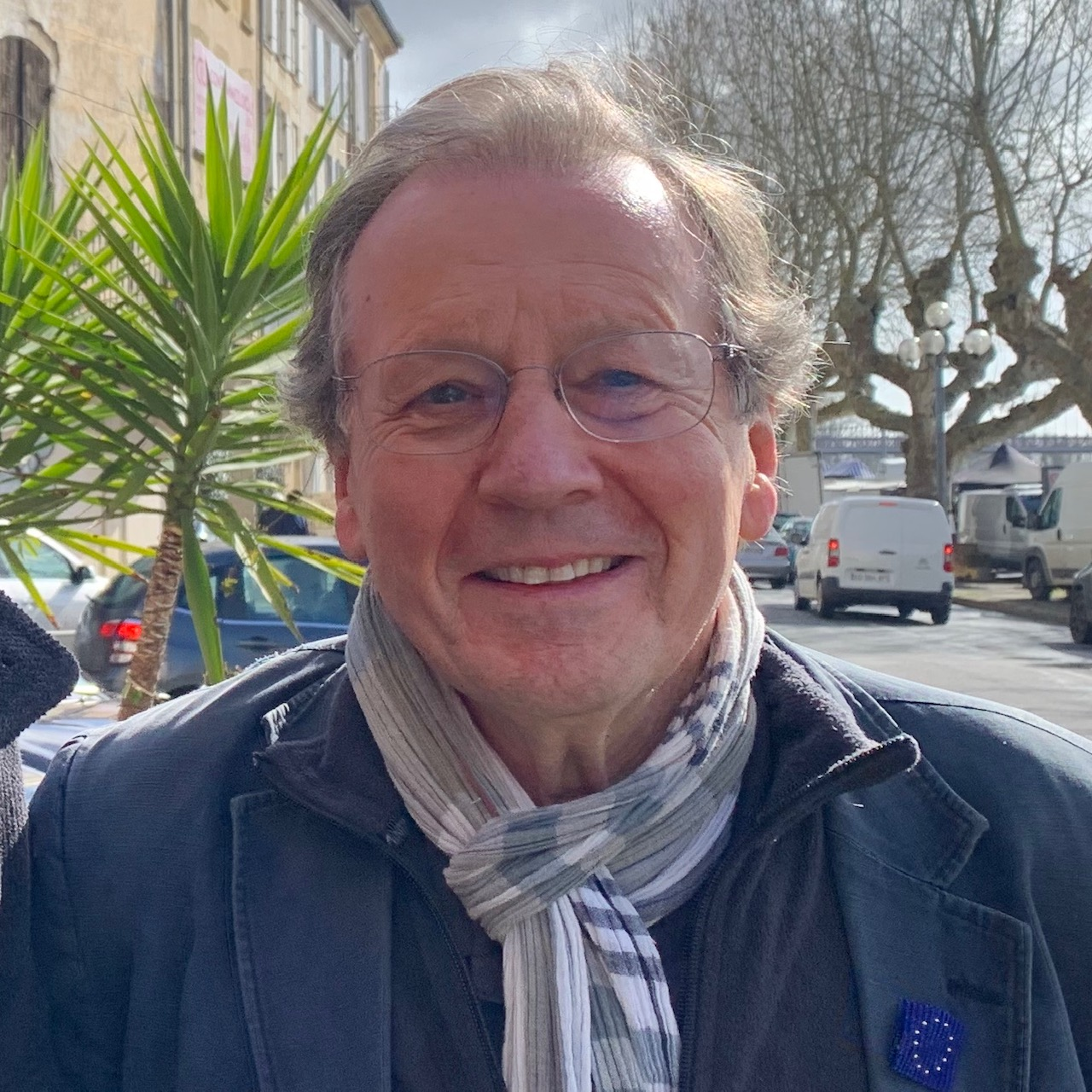
- Ferguson in 2020

1st Mayor of Bristol
- In office 19 November 2012 – 8 May 2016
- Deputy: Geoff Gollop
- Preceded by: Position Established
- Succeeded by: Marvin Rees

Councillor for Cabot
- In office 1973–1979

Personal details
- Born: George Robin Paget Ferguson; 22 March 1947 (age 79) Winchester, Hampshire, England
- Party: Bristol 1st (2012–2016)
- Other political affiliations: Liberal (1970–1988); Liberal Democrats (1988–2012)
- Spouse: Lavinia (separated 2000)
- Children: 3
- Education: Wellington College, Berkshire
- Alma mater: University of Bristol
- Occupation: Former politician, former architect, businessman
- Website: peopleandcities.com

George Robin Paget Ferguson CBE, PPRIBA, RWA (born 22 March 1947) is a British politician, former architect, and entrepreneur who served as the first elected mayor of Bristol from 2012 to 2016.

Ferguson was co-founder of Ferguson Mann Architects in 1979, where regeneration and historic building work formed the foundation of the practice. He was also the founder of the national architectural group Acanthus. He is a past president of the Royal Institute of British Architects (2003–2005) where "he was noted for championing the causes of education, the environment and good urbanism". He was a founding director of The Academy of Urbanism and a founding member of the British sustainable transport charity Sustrans. Ferguson was appointed Commander of the Order of the British Empire (CBE) in the 2010 New Year Honours for services to architecture and to the community in the South West of England. In November 2012, Ferguson became the first elected mayor of Bristol. He was a member of the Society of Merchant Venturers before stepping down due to a conflict of interest upon becoming Mayor of Bristol.

== Early life ==
Ferguson was born on 22 March 1947, in Winchester, Hampshire. His father's military career took the family to Gibraltar, to the South and North of England and Norway before settling in Wiltshire. While in Gibraltar, Ferguson contracted infant polio.

== Education ==
Ferguson was educated at Wellington College. Ferguson read architecture at the University of Bristol from 1965 to 1971. Ferguson has been awarded honorary degrees from the University of Bristol and the University of the West of England. Apart from one year in London, Ferguson has lived in Bristol since beginning his degree in 1965.

== Career in architecture ==
Urban renewal and environmental sustainability were central elements of Ferguson's approach to design, exemplified by developments such as the Tobacco Factory. In 1978, Ferguson co-founded Ferguson Mann Architects and the practice won many awards for design. In 1986, Ferguson founded Acanthus, a network of independent practices committed to design and conservation.

During his career, Ferguson has written and presented articles, broadcasts and lectures on planning and architectural matters and sustainability, and appeared on the 2005 Channel 4 television series Demolition. Ferguson fully stepped down from Ferguson Mann Architects after his election as Mayor of Bristol to concentrate on his new role within the city.

== Regeneration in South Bristol ==
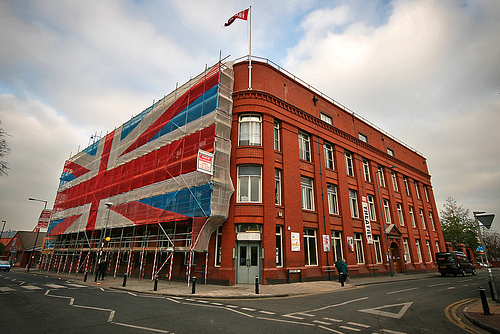
The Tobacco Factory during cleaning work which saw a Union Flag covering scaffolding

Ferguson is noted for his role in the regeneration of the Bedminster area of South Bristol. In 1994, he bought the last remaining major building of the old Imperial Tobacco Raleigh Road estate for £200,000 to save it from demolition and regenerate it. The site, now named the Tobacco Factory, is a mixed-use development that includes the Tobacco Factory Theatre, bar, creative industry workspace and flats.

In 2003, Ferguson bought part of the long-closed Ashton Gate Brewery. The Bristol Beer Factory began brewing beer on the site in 2005 and has won national awards. In 2018 Ferguson moved back to Clifton, having lived in the Tobacco Factory for a number of years.

== Politics ==
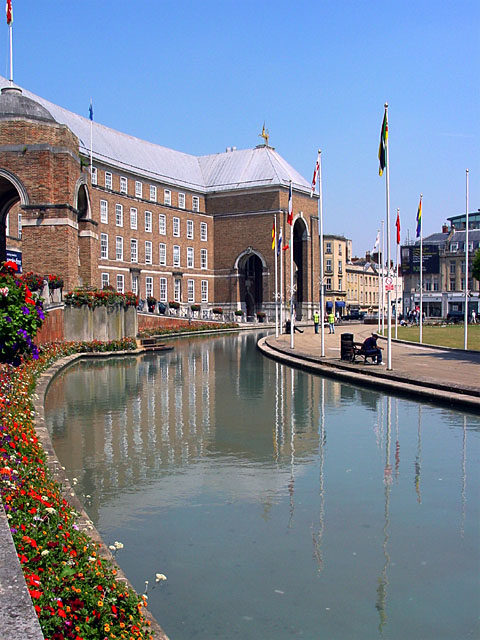
City Hall, College Green

Ferguson was one of the first three Liberal Councillors elected to Bristol City Council, representing Cabot Ward from 1973 to 1979. He stood unsuccessfully for the Liberals in the 1983 and 1987 general elections in Bristol West, coming second on both occasions with 29.4% and 31.3% respectively, after which he ceased any active political involvement.

In March 2012, Ferguson confirmed speculation that he was planning to stand as an independent candidate for Mayor of Bristol if the referendum on 3 May chose to adopt the mayoral system. Following the referendum, Ferguson resigned his membership from the Liberal Democrat party before announcing that he would stand for mayor, but explained that he had no intention to run as a party candidate. Ferguson ran as an independent but registered his 'Bristol 1st' party to distinguish himself from other independents on the ballot paper. In his campaign material, Ferguson stated "My only purpose is to make Bristol, the city I love, a better city for all. I have no political ambition beyond Bristol" and he set out his seven visions for Bristol. Ferguson campaigned on a platform of anti-political parties, often alleging voting for a Labour candidate would be a return to party in-fighting.

The election was held on 15 November 2012. On 16 November 2012, Ferguson was declared Bristol's first elected mayor, beating the second-place Labour candidate Marvin Rees by more than 6,000 votes including second preference votes. The election saw a low turnout of just 27.92% of the electorate participating.

== Mayor of Bristol ==
Ferguson was sworn in as the first directly elected mayor of Bristol in the Passenger Shed at Bristol Temple Meads station on 20 November 2012. On his first day of taking office, Ferguson implemented two policies, revoking Sunday car parking charges and announcing that the 'Council House', the administrative seat of Bristol, would be renamed 'City Hall'.

Ferguson appointed a "rainbow cabinet" comprising a deputy and five assistant mayors, drawn from four of the main political parties. He also appointed two youth mayors following a citywide election by the youth community. Ferguson took a portion of his salary as mayor in the local Bristol Pound. The salary of the mayor of Bristol was aligned with the salary of a UK Member of Parliament in 2013, and has not risen despite independent recommendations and a 10% increase in MP's pay to £74,000.

Ferguson's tenure as mayor of Bristol came to an end after one term in May 2016, when he was voted out of office in a landslide vote. Ferguson polled only one third of the total votes, including second preferences, against Marvin Rees who secured two thirds.

=== Public finances ===
One of Ferguson's first challenges on election was to cut £35 million from the 2013/14 budget and plan for a further £65 million in spending cuts over the following three years as part of central Government austerity measures. Most of the savings in the 2013/14 budget (approximately £20 million) were achieved through cuts and changes in council staffing.

Over the next 12 months, the challenge had increased to cutting £90 million. Ferguson proposed to achieve most of the savings through staffing cuts and other efficiencies within the council. Several cuts proposed in the 2014–2017 draft budget generated feedback, such as a proposal to discontinue staff supervision at Hengrove Park. Following the 2014–2017 Bristol city council budget public consultation, Ferguson and the Council removed some of the proposed changes.

Following Ferguson's term an independent report, the Bundred Report, identified that there were substantial savings of over £29 million that had been falsely accounted by his administration, and that Ferguson had presided over serious "leadership failures" that had led to a shortfall in city budgets. Kerry McCarthy MP brought the issue to national attention at Prime Minister's Questions where she described the "abject failure by the previous mayor [George Ferguson] to get a grip on council finances." Police confirmed that they had received complaints of fraud over Ferguson's budgets in the lead-up to the 2016 Mayoral election, and suspicion that the true state of the Council finances had been deliberately covered up to aid Ferguson's chances of reelection.

=== Traffic and transport ===
Ferguson had expressed his determination to tackle traffic congestion by trying to force a change in the city's culture and get people out of cars and onto buses or bicycles.

==== Residents parking zones (RPZ) ====
In March 2013, Ferguson announced plans to expand existing residents parking zones across the city, in order to reduce the number of commuters driving into the city. The plans were scaled back in June 2013 following public consultation and "heavy criticism".

Ferguson made changes to new schemes to reflect feedback from the public, including introducing a traders permit and making the first 30 minutes free in all new areas. Ferguson has maintained that his RPZ proposals enjoy a high level of support from the "quiet majority". However, in January 2015, the council's own statistics revealed that over 90% of Clifton respondents in a request for feedback had objected to his plans.

Ferguson's plan to expand RPZ across the city was contentious. The roll-out was beset by protests in several districts of the City where streets in Easton and Montpellier were barricaded to prevent the implementation. The project infrastructure, ticket machines and painted lines have also been widely vandalised costing an estimated £30,000 in repairs.

==== Speed limits ====
Mayor Ferguson spearheaded the roll-out of a £2.3 million programme of 20 mph limits across the city, following pilots in Bedminster and east Bristol in 2010. In November 2014, Councillors passed a motion calling on Ferguson to give Neighbourhood Partnerships the power to decide on 20 mph limits for their communities.

In February 2015, Ferguson was caught breaking the speed limit in a Bristol City Council fleet car whilst driving at 35 mph in a 30 mph area on a journey from Avonmouth along the Portway. He went on record saying it was "a stupid mistake" and apologised for it. He stated "Speed limits are there for a good purpose. We should respect them, and I do respect them." He was later mocked on the popular BBC Two television show Top Gear.

==== Metrobus ====
Metrobus, previously Bristol Rapid Transit (BRT), is a scheme developed jointly by the West of England Partnership: a partnership between Bristol City, North Somerset and South Gloucestershire Councils. In development from 2006 it received government backing in November 2013. During the Mayoral election campaign, Ferguson pledged to cancel the proposed BRT scheme if he was elected. When he came to office, Ferguson made minor amendments to route proposals rather than cancelling the project. In July 2013, Ferguson announced that surrounding local authorities had approved the changes he'd proposed to the route of the planned BRT2 to avoid it running through the Bristol Harbourside area. The system, renamed Metrobus, was also changed to use modern low emission vehicles which were later dropped as a cost-cutting measure. However, protest groups who challenged the route, cost, and feasibility of the scheme accused Ferguson of breaking the electoral promises laid out before his election.

A second challenge to Ferguson's support of the Metrobus project came when the next phase was submitted for planning consent in March 2014. Objections to the application were raised over the proposed felling of a large number of mature trees, to the loss of Grade 1 agricultural land at Stapleton that Ferguson had previously promised in his election manifesto to protect, the damage to the setting of Grade II* Listed Stoke Park Dower House and Grade II Registered parks and gardens surrounding it, and the lack of public consultation over the proposals. Following the approval of the scheme in August 2014 work began in January 2015 causing further protest, and activists set up camp in trees the council were about to fell. Ferguson's support for the project remained resolute. With Bristol's status as European Green Capital in 2015, Ferguson reiterated his support for the scheme and referred to the developing protest as "a challenging situation" and claimed he had "done more than anyone to minimise the environmental effects of the Metrobus project". Protesters attended a press event at which Ferguson was present with Government Environment Secretary Liz Truss planting the one millionth tree of the national Big Tree Plant programme. At it, he accused the protesters of "blowing this issue out of all proportion".

=== City branding and international travel ===
Ferguson has referred to Bristol as a 'brand' and himself as "Bristol's Brand manager". During a 12-month period from January to December 2014, Ferguson and his entourage took six international flights. Ferguson's international travel as Bristol Mayor exceeded that of London's mayor Boris Johnson in the same period.

=== Sale of Bristol Port ===
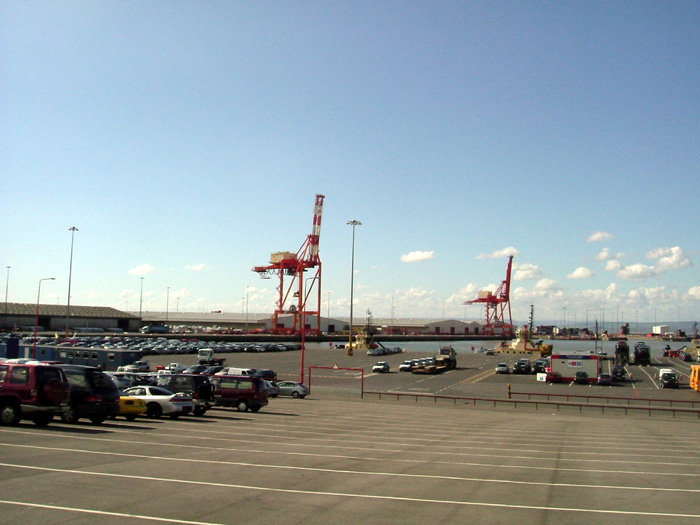
Royal Portbury Dock

In March 2014, Ferguson expressed his intention to sell the freehold ownership of Avonmouth and Portbury docks which had been retained by the city council since the leasehold was sold in 1991. Controversy surrounded the sale from the beginning.

On 1 April 2014, Ferguson decided to sell the port to The Bristol Port Company for £10 million. However, elected councillors felt the valuation report undervalued the 2,000 acres (810 ha) estate because the Bristol Port Company had a £13.7 million annual turnover during the years 2013–2014. Ferguson's peers also felt the deal lacked transparency. On 1 June 2015, 16 councillors voted against the sale, while 41 backed the sale. Following the vote they referred the decision back to Ferguson for reconsideration. Ferguson approved the deal on 16 June 2015.

At the same meeting, the assistant mayor with responsibility for property and transport, Mark Bradshaw, expressed his opposition to the sale. Later in the evening, the Ferguson sacked Bradshaw from his cabinet position by email. Ferguson later accused Bradshaw, who was running as Labour's mayoral candidate in the following year's elections of "playing party politics". Ferguson denied accusations that he'd sacked Bradshaw for opposing his wishes or being a threat to his hoped re-election and claimed Bradshaw had "started to use the cabinet and his position as a political stage for his own ambition".

Days before the 2016 mayoral elections on 5 May, it transpired that Ferguson had covered up the potential for oil shale gas (fracking) on the Avonmouth port estate cited "major embarrassment" if it was revealed after the sale and an obstacle in getting councillor's approval for the sale. Ferguson wrote to the port stating their pursuant of an extraction licence "very unfortunately, in any case, complicate(s) the proposed freehold sale and would cause me major embarrassment if it went ahead in its present form." Port Company executives agreed, stating that: "we always recognise potential for embarrassment around shale gas extraction". It remained unclear whether any protection of the area has been negotiated.

=== European Green Capital ===
In March 2013, Ferguson led a delegation from Bristol to Brussels to present Bristol's bid to be European Green Capital 2015 and three months later it was announced that Bristol had won. Bristol received a £7 million grant from the Department of Energy and Climate Change (DECC) to support the year-long event, and the council approved a further £1 million of its own funds for the same.

An arms-length company was formed to organise the events for the year - Bristol 2015 Ltd - of which Ferguson became a director. Andrew Garrad, who'd been the second largest donor to George Ferguson's election campaign, was elected by the Bristol 2015 Board to the unpaid post of chair. Garrad remained a member of the same private group The Society of Merchant Venturers from whom Ferguson had stood down from shortly after the election.

In December 2014, the proposed recipients of Bristol's Green Capital Strategic Grants were announced. Grants were awarded by Bristol 2015 Ltd on the recommendation of a panel which contained neither members of the Board nor employees of the company. Of the 136 groups applied for funding, only 32 were accepted, ten of which Bristol 2015 board members managed or worked for and accounted for £500,000 of the total grants made. A company called Playing Out CIC, of which Ferguson's daughter is managing director, received £41,000 raising questions about the public accountability of Bristol 2015 Ltd, and apparent conflicts of interest between its directors, employees, and outside organisations.

In total Bristol 2015 supported 204 projects in the city through various grants.

Concerns continued over Bristol 2015 Ltd's management of the £8 million of public money. As the limited company had no legal requirement to publish its accounts, and refused to do so, concerns were raised with Mr Ferguson, as mayor and a company director. It was stated that there was a lack of transparency in how funds had been spent, and how certain elements, such as a web site that cost almost a quarter of a million pounds, had been procured and managed. In addition to the money spent by Bristol 2015 Ltd, it later transpired that the city had paid a further £29,000 in hotel bills for the mayor and executive council officers for attendance at the COP21 climate change conference in Paris which was a requirement of the DECC grant.

At the closing ceremony on 5 February 2016, protesters calling for the publication of the accounts were branded "lunatics" by Mr Ferguson, and, although still refusing to make the full spending public, claimed "I have nothing to hide". He later dismissed the debate about the use of the £8 million as a "fuss about the cost of sandwiches".

A detailed report "It Doesn't Stop Here! A City-Wide Review" on Bristol's year as European Green Capital was published by Bristol 2015 Ltd in February 2016. After his election in May 2016, Mayor Rees announced, in his swearing-in speech, that he would commission an independent review of the European Green Capital. Stephen Bundred, a retired senior civil servant who had been chief executive of the Audit Commission, was appointed in October 2016 to undertake the review. His report was published in January 2017. Bundred concludes "The bottom line is that measured against the task that it was given, it is impossible to reach any other conclusion than that Bristol 2015 Ltd performed well and the Green Capital year was a considerable success." In January 2017, Mayor Rees summarised his own view of Bristol's European Green Capital as "an undoubted success with a few bumps in the road". Bristol Green Capital Partnership, which was strengthened and re-structured during 2015 by a specific grant, will now carry on the legacy work.

In 2015, Bristol Energy, a municipally owned energy supply company, was founded. It was seen as "a new model of energy company that contributes to the wellbeing of local communities", and was intended to support local renewable energy generators and reinvest profits back into Bristol council services. The company began taking customers in February 2016.

=== Bristol Arena ===
The prioritisation of an entertainment arena for Bristol, building on the efforts of previous administrations, was one of Ferguson's central pledges of his mayoral campaign. The proposal was approved as part of Bristol City Council's budget in February 2014 and the 12,000 capacity venue on the site of the former Bristol Bath Road depot was expected to open in 2017. The bulk of funding came as a loan of £53 million from the City Deal to be repaid by the retention of business rates arising from regeneration, via the West of England Local Enterprise Partnership, while the council will loan a further £38 million to be financed by the lease to the operator. The costs involved in the project spiralled from £80 million when it was first proposed by Ferguson, to £92.5 million by October 2015, a 16% increase in budget, and the proposed opening delayed until 2018. By 17 September 2015 the project's cost had risen to £94 million. It was also revealed that the 12,000 capacity arena would be provided with not more than 45 car parking spaces.

In October 2015, Ferguson had remarked that only a "stupid city" would invest in arena car parking, but four months later his officers put forward plans for an 8-storey 500-space car park to serve it.

In March 2016, Ferguson's plans suffered a further setback when the city's planning committee described the proposals as "defective". The committee, who hold an impartial and quasi-judicial responsibility under planning law, deferred making a decision until an appropriate level of supporting information could be provided. It was stated the scheme had been "rushed" to try to get it approved during Ferguson's re-election campaign, public concern over parking and transport around the proposals had not been properly addressed, and the committee were not confident in the detail submitted for approval. Ferguson expressed himself as angry and outraged at the majority decision of the committee. His accusations that the planning committee were "playing politics" united cross-party condemnation, and it was declared as unhelpful of the mayor to "display such public acts of pique" over the considered judgements of the committee.

Prior to the cancellation of the arena project in September 2018 and in one of a number of public interventions, Ferguson authored a scathing letter to Bristol 24/7 in which he accused his successor Marvin Rees of breaking 'all seven principles of public life' in his conduct regarding the decision. Rees stated he cancelled the project because of building cost and financial risk. By 2018 estimated costs had increased to £150 million, with the council liable for half of any cost overruns. Operating costs arising should the arena not be successful would fall on the council, and expert advice was that the venue size was too small for major events.

=== The City Deal ===
In March 2014, Ferguson, together with the leaders of the three surrounding authorities that form the West of England, agreed a 'City Deal' with Government. This would allow Bristol to retain income from business rates and decide how the money should be spent. In the past, business rates were kept by Government to be distributed nationally.

However, in January 2015, with Bristol City Council still to sign a deal with other local authorities, Ferguson launched an alternative partnership for a city region with the cities of Cardiff and Newport in Wales. Rejecting the previous partnership negotiated with the city's neighbouring local authorities he stated "I like to move at the pace of the fastest, not the slowest". More than a year later, in February 2016, surrounding Local authorities had still not been consulted on the "Great Western Cities Plan" leading to concerns that Ferguson was jeopardising devolution discussions with government. The deputy leader of neighbouring North Somerset Council, Elfan Ap Rees, said "We're in the middle of trying to sort out the devolution deal to our benefit for the West of England and here's the mayor (George Ferguson) trotting off to do something entirely different. It's ridiculous."

=== Festivals ===
Ferguson introduced 'Make Sunday Special', an idea borrowed from Bordeaux, one of Bristol's twin cities. On selected Sundays in the summer, some roads in the city centre are closed to motor vehicles and various entertainments or events are laid on. This initiative ended simultaneously with the end of Ferguson's tenure.

Ferguson is currently patron of Circus City – Bristol's biennial circus festival. A flagship event on the city's cultural calendar, Circus City spans 3–4 weeks, and hosts 80+ events in 15+ venues across the city, with the aim of promoting Bristol as an international capital of contemporary circus arts.

=== Public image ===
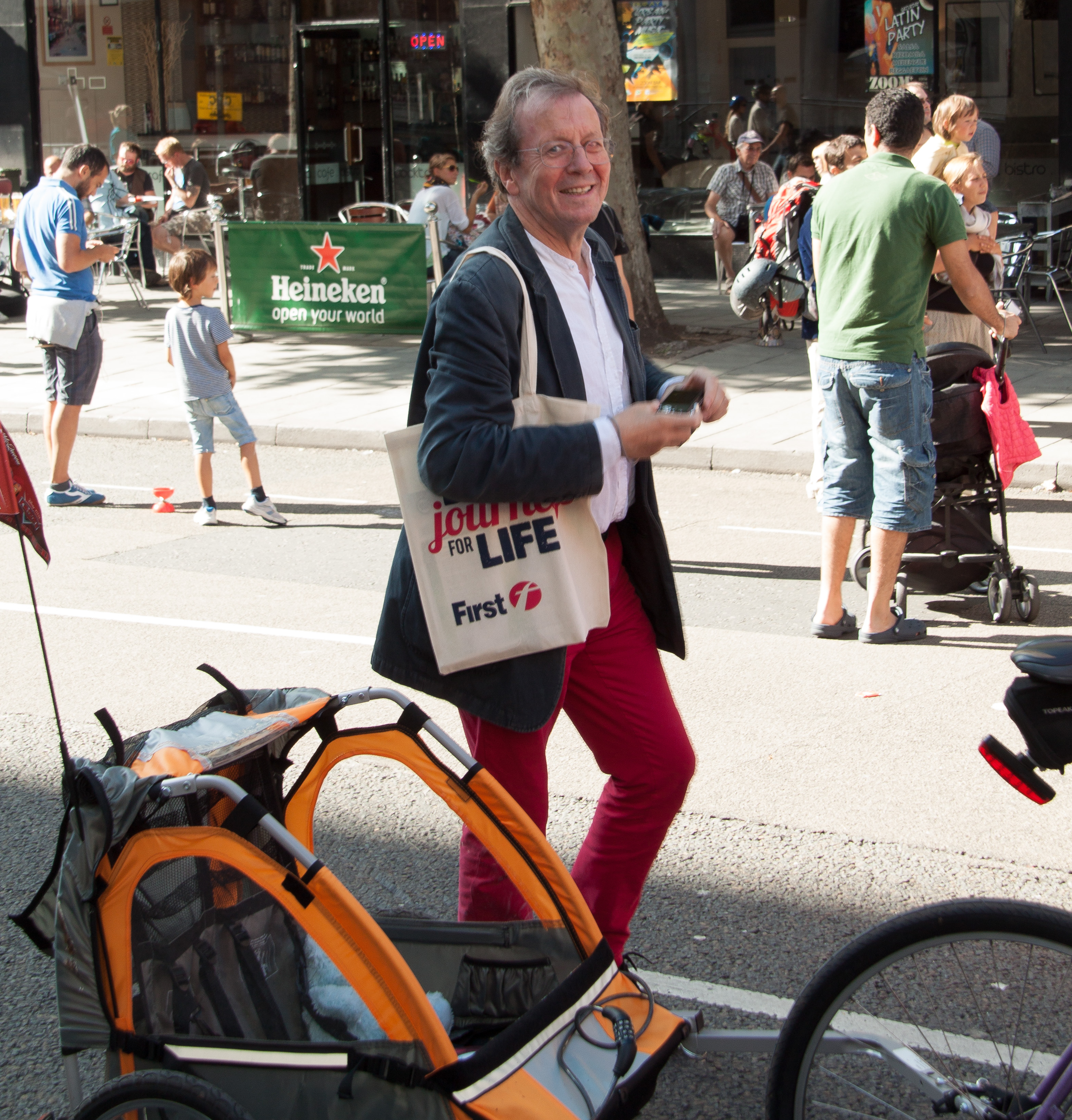
Ferguson wearing his trademark red trousers.

Ferguson is a self-proclaimed 'establishment rebel' and has stated that his well-known trademark red trousers signify this. He has been described as "larger than life", and his leadership style has been described positively as "decisive", but conversely as "arrogant" and "high handed". Research undertaken by Bristol University demonstrated increased visibility of city governance under the mayoral model, but revealed citizens felt unrepresented and concerned about how decisions were being taken.

Several incidents have occurred during Ferguson's tenure as mayor that have received widespread media coverage and affected his public image. Ferguson himself acknowledged the issues in an interview with the BBC in January 2016 and sought to highlight the positive change the mayoral model had brought about.

During the run-up to the mayoral election, in September 2012, Ferguson had been forced to apologise for suggesting some ways of developing the city may be "too Irish", a derogatory term implying that they were ludicrous or illogical. In May 2013, Ferguson was caught on camera using a four-letter expletive directed at a member of public, 27-year-old citizen Paul Saville, at a public event in Bristol city centre. George Ferguson later accused him of stalking and refused to apologise for the insult saying he "was not sorry". The event drew local and UK national media coverage, including the BBC, and quickly generated a series of T-shirts parodying the words he'd used.

The following month the leader of the Conservative group of city councillors made an official complaint to the city director about a "foul mouthed" outburst from the mayor. In a short exchange Ferguson was reported to have used a four-letter word several times; an incident that sparked further media interest.

On 7 January 2015, after a Bristol motorist posted a "joke" comment on social media implying that he had driven off after hitting a cyclist, Ferguson commented that his tweet "has chilling echoes of 60's Deep South racism". The following day, he was forced to apologise following public criticism of the comparison.

In his defence in January 2016, Ferguson claimed "Occasionally I may have lost my rag with people....it may have been once a year....but it gets repeated and repeated and that becomes my image." In the same interview Ferguson tackled public perceptions of his "dictatorial" nature and pledged to be "more consensual" if he were re-elected. However, he failed to win re-election.

== Personal life ==
George Ferguson and his wife Lavinia separated in 2000 following a well publicised affair with a BBC journalist, Helen Reed, although they remain married. They have three grown children.

Ferguson has been involved in several local charities including the Avon Youth Association, Cruse, and Starfish. He was also a trustee of the University of Bristol Union.

Ferguson was appointed High Sheriff of Bristol when that office was revived in 1996 and served for one year. He was also previously a board member of the think tank Demos, a trustee of the Arnolfini arts centre, and was formerly a member of the private charitable organisation The Society of Merchant Venturers.
