= Nychos =

Austrian illustrator and urban artist

- Born: 1982 (age 43–44); Bruck an der Mur, Styria, Austria
- Movement: street art and graffiti artist

Nychos (born 1982) is an illustrator, urban artist and graffiti artist from Austria. He is known for his characteristic dissection, cross-section, x-ray and translucent styles, often portraying animals and characters drawn from pop culture.

His works can be seen on walls around the world while his works on canvas and drawings have been shown in galleries, internationally. In 2015 the artist released the documentary “The Deepest Depths of the Burrow”, which depicts his experiences as a globetrotting artist.

Nychos' pseudonym originates from dinosaurs named “Deinonychus”. The name means “terrible claw” in Latin.

== Early career ==
Born into a family of hunters in Bruck an der Mur, Styria, Austria, Nychos was fascinated by the anatomical details resulting from the exercise of hunting from an early age. At age 14, Nychos had already decided he wanted to become a comic artist and character designer. At 17, Nychos learned of street art culture and the use of spray cans—a practice which allowed for the addition of color to his then black and white cartoons while demanding for quicker and more spontaneous works. As a result of his family's hunting activities, motifs of dissection started to appear in his works around 2011, with some aspects of it already evident in works from previous years. The work "Fur Skin Skeleton" is considered the first to bare such style, according to the artist. Later in his career, the artist also started to portray cross-sections in his work.

== Style and influence ==
Nychos defines his work as a fusion of graffiti, heavy metal, cartoons and anatomy. In most of his works on canvas and murals the main characters are depicted dissected, transparent or melting with their insides on display.

The latest style that has surfaced is the use of translucency to create an x-ray effect in his works. After years experimenting with the effect of “cuts”, the artist evolved to find new compositions that would represent the insides of his characters. Working with these new styles allowed the artist to add more details in each layer, achieving more realistic results.

== Murals ==
Nychos distinguishes himself from most graffiti artists for his spontaneous creative process. He does not rely on the support of projection to create his walls and only uses sketches during the creation of murals.

Nychos is known for the speed in which he paints his large murals. His biggest mural to date, titled "Translucent Serpent," was completed in August 2016 for the Mural Harbor Street Art Project. The piece in Linz, Austria, occupies a space of nearly 900 m^{2} (9,700 sq ft), and was painted in 65 days without assistance.

== Solo exhibitions ==
- 2015: Translucent Fear, Kolly Gallery, Zürich, Switzerland
- 2016: IKON, Jonathan Levine Gallery, New York City
- 2017: Monochrome Organism, Juddy Roller, Melbourne, Australia
- 2018: Endless Layers Till Consciousness, Mirus Gallery, San Francisco, USA
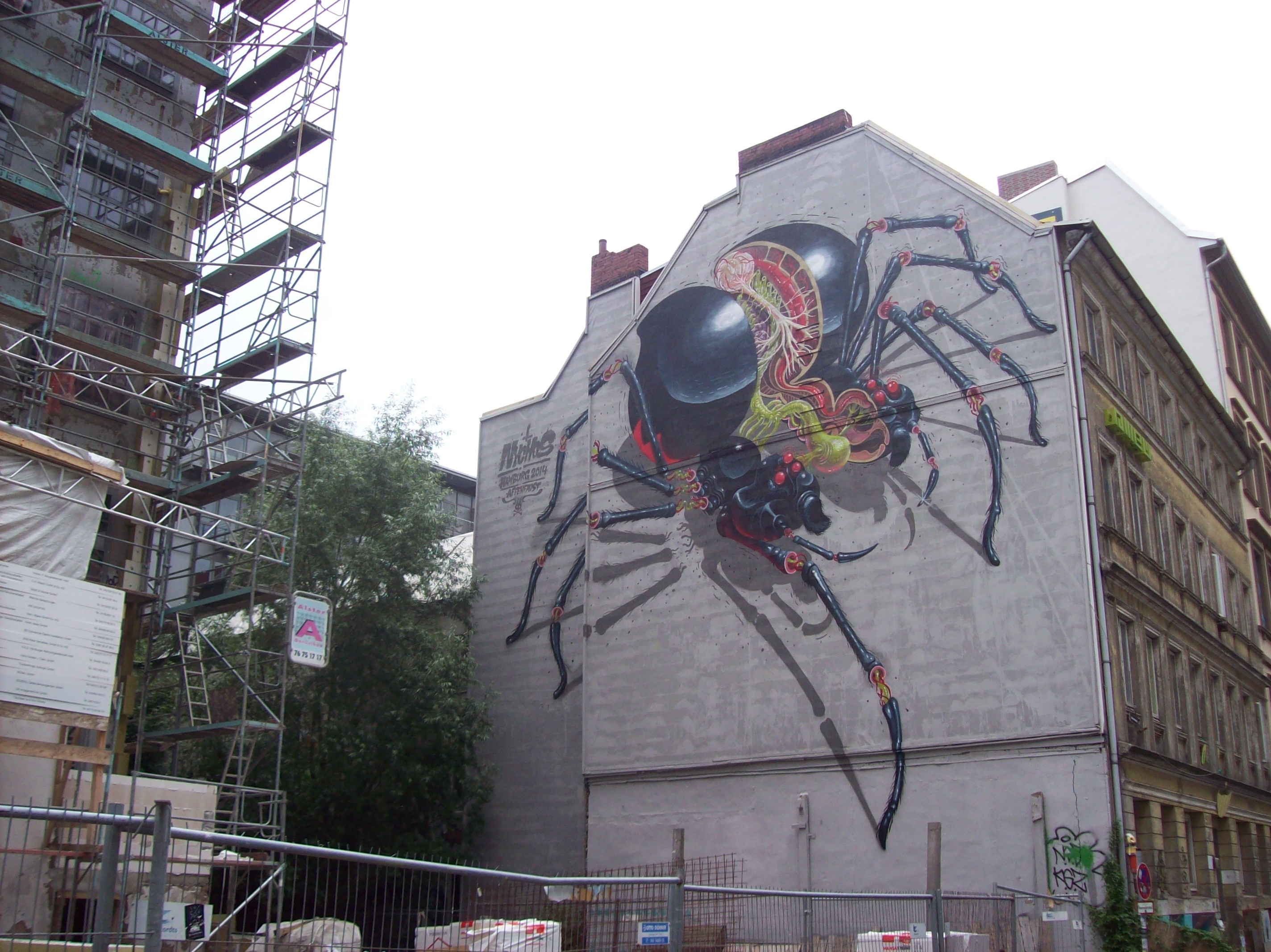

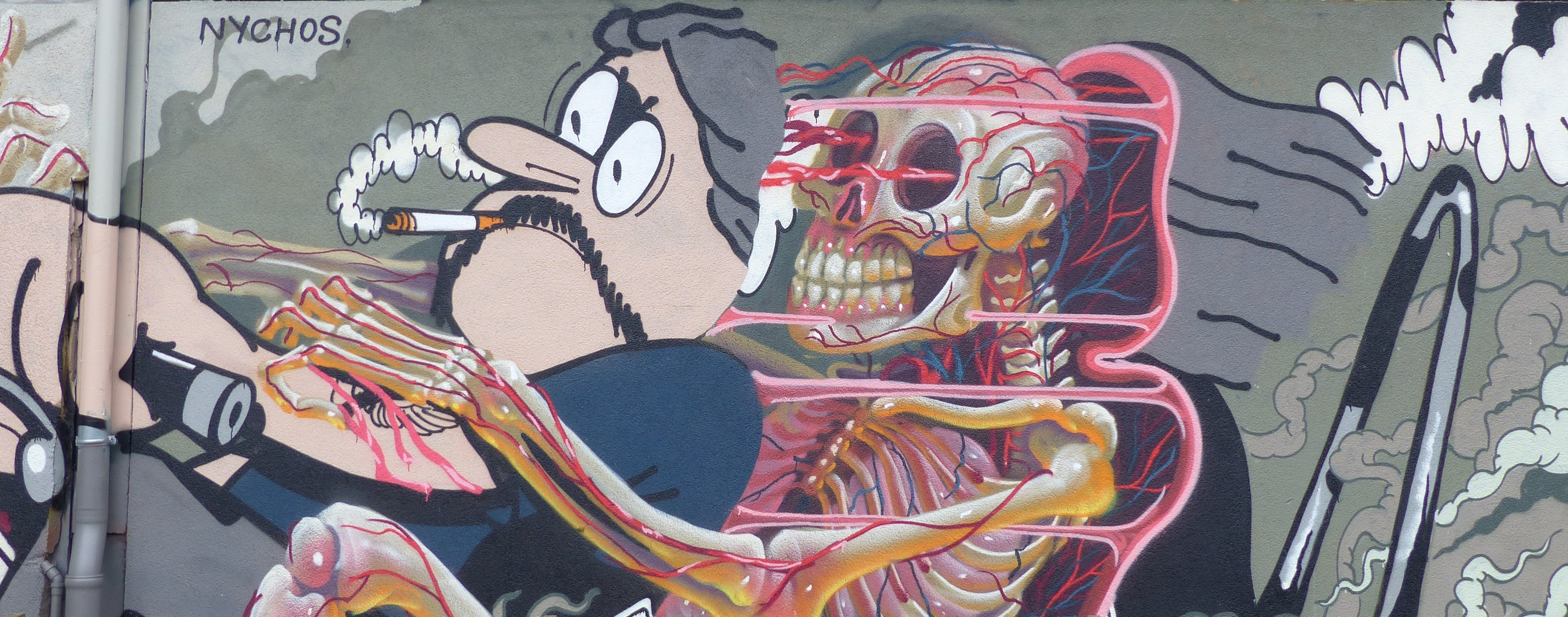

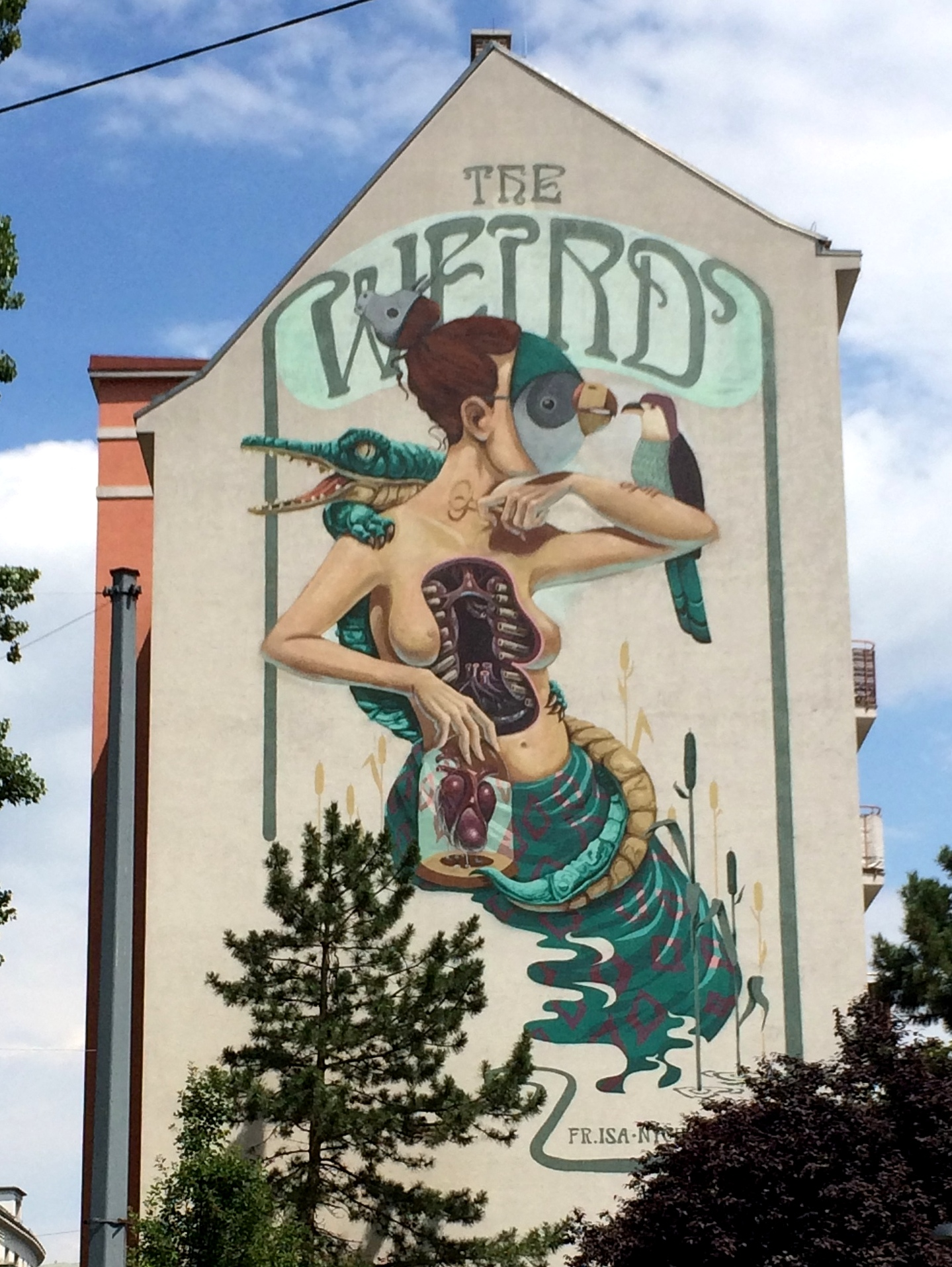

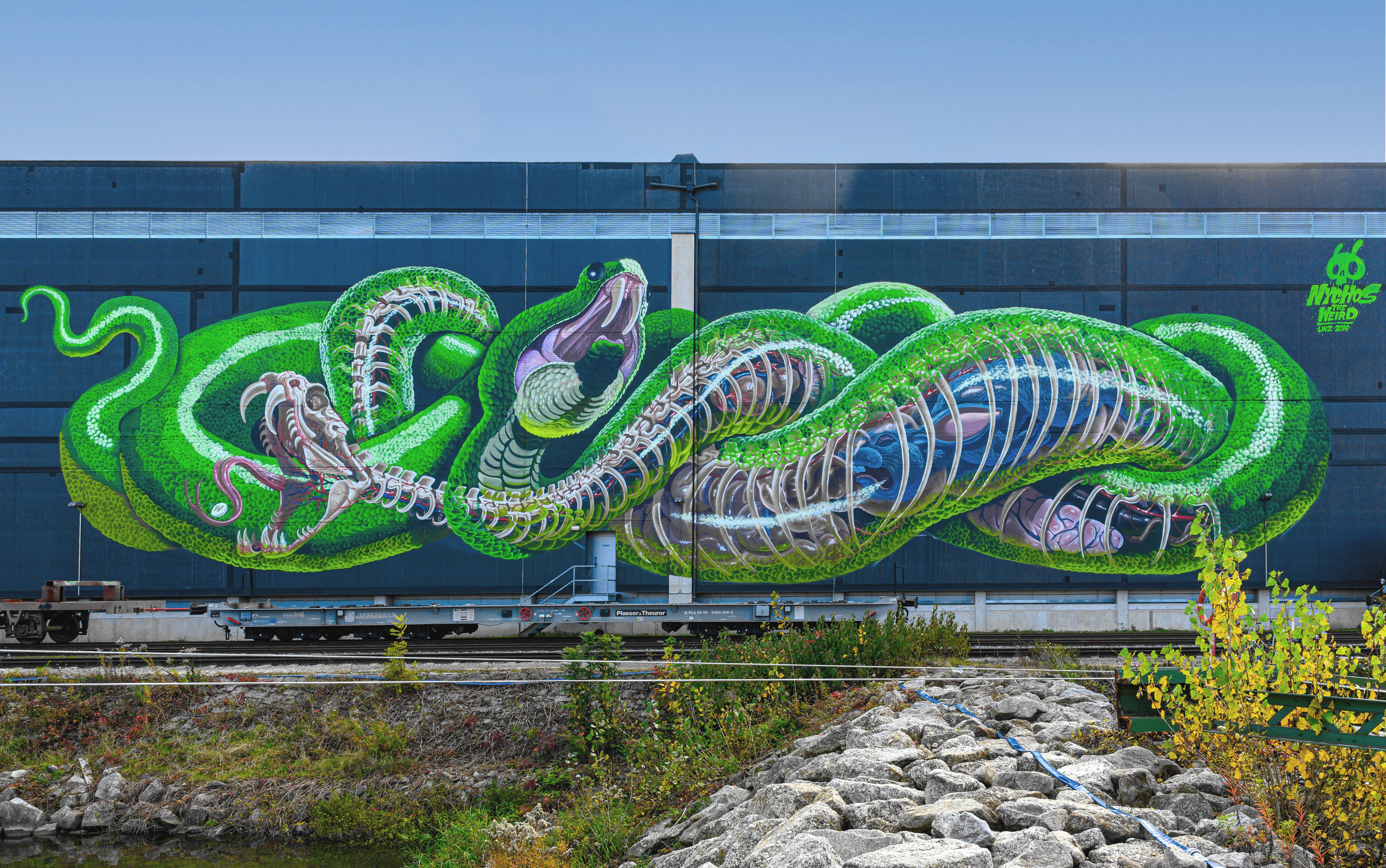

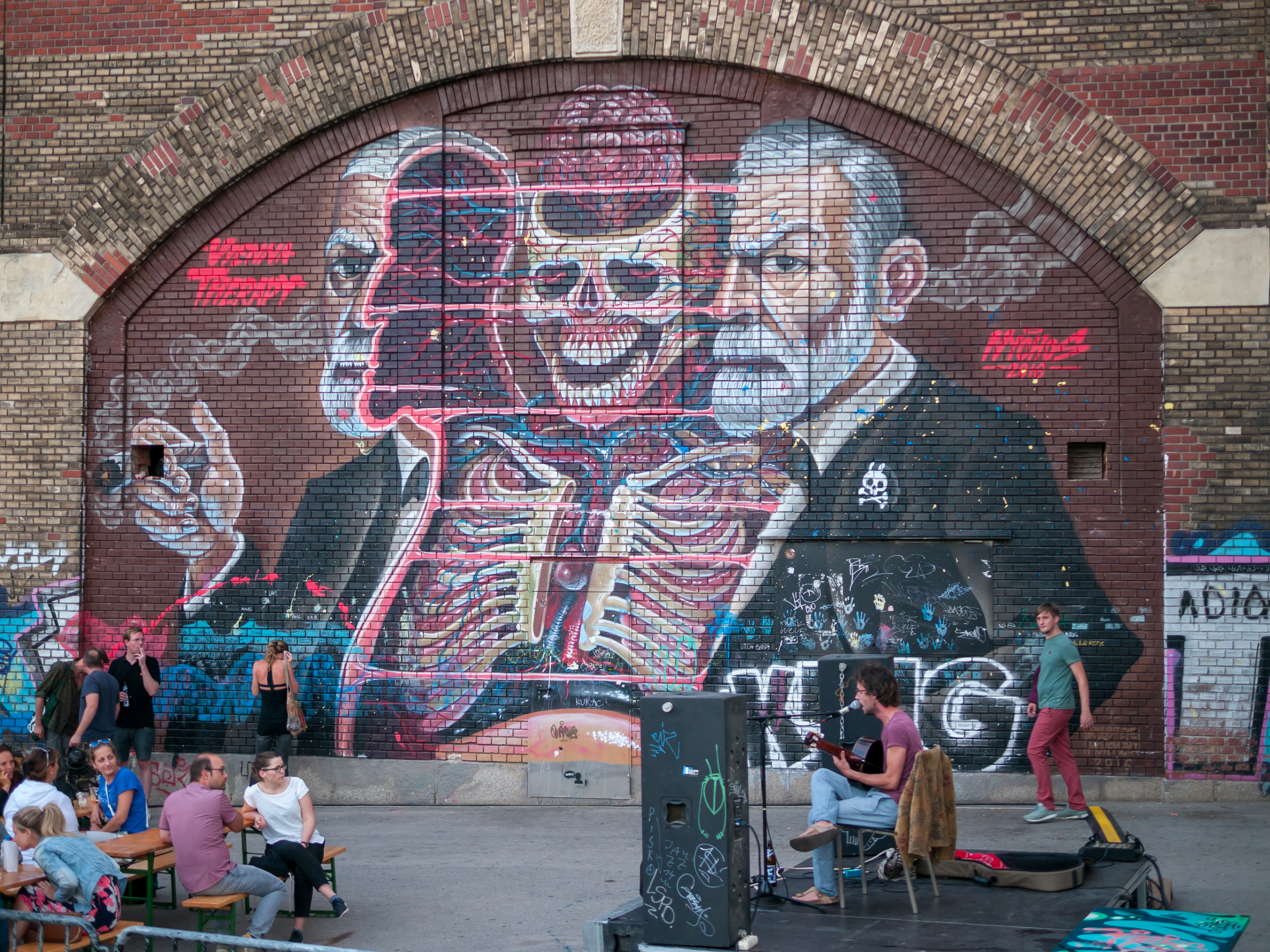
