= Dones =

Dones is a surname. Notable people with the surname include:

- Angel Dones (born 1990), judoka
- Elvira Dones (born 1960), Albanian novelist, screenwriter, and producer
- Erminio Dones (1882–1945), Italian rower
- Rafael Dones (1944–1984), Puerto Rican drug dealer
- Sidney P. Dones (1888–1947), American businessman

== See also ==
- Pau Donés (1966–2020), Spanish songwriter, guitarist, and vocalist
