= Blue Murder (Peter Nichols play) =

1995 play by Peter Nichols

Blue Murder by Peter Nichols was written in 1995 as a four-act drama, in response to those who had often questioned why Nichols had never written a play surrounding a murder investigation. Blue Murder opened at Royal Court Theatre in London on 23 May 1995 without the performance of the third act. Despite Nichols' objections, the third act was removed due to budgetary constraints.

The play was not performed in its entirety until 1998 by the Show of Strength Theatre Company at the Lyceum Theatre, Edinburgh. Charles Spencer of The Daily Telegraph later stated that "Show Of Strength has a major scoop on its hands... an absolute cracker, as ingenious as it is riotously funny".
