= Tobacco Factory =

Building in Bristol, England

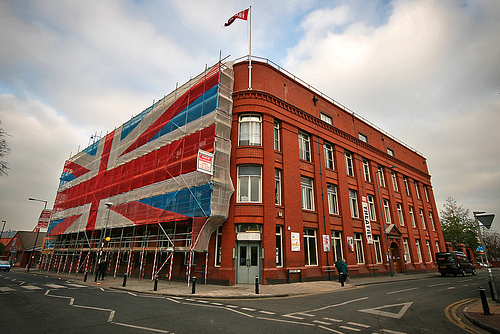
- The Tobacco Factory during cleaning work which saw a Union Jack flag covering scaffolding

- Location within Bristol

General information
- Architectural style: Industrial
- Location: Bristol, England
- Coordinates: 51.4423°N 2.6135°W
- Client: W. D. & H. O. Wills

Technical details
- Structural system: Brick and Iron

The Tobacco Factory is the last remaining part of the old W. D. & H. O. Wills tobacco factory site on Raleigh Road, Southville, Bristol. It was saved from demolition by the architect and former mayor of the city George Ferguson and through his vision has become a model of urban regeneration. It is now a multi-use building which houses animation and performing arts school, loft-style apartments, a café bar, offices and a theatre.

Inspired by the Manchester Independents campaign, George Ferguson decided to launch a Bristol-based campaign from the Tobacco Factory, the purpose is to encourage the support and patronage of independent outlets and businesses to help redress the balance that has swung strongly in favour of the multiples at the expense of local character and enterprise. Business at the Tobacco Factory epitomises this, with home grown enterprises, such as Fanatic Design, CLIK.

== History ==
The factory was built between 1898 and 1901 as 'Number 3 Factory' for W.D. & H.O. Wills. The building was used to process tobacco until 1985-6 when Imperial Tobacco, which W.D & H.O. Wills had latterly been a part of, relocated production. The building fell into disrepair until 10 September 1993, when George Ferguson bought the building with the plan to regenerate it as a creative, mixed-use community building.

== Tobacco Factory Theatre ==
Since the creation of the theatre space on the first floor in 1998, companies including Show of Strength Theatre Company, Shakespeare at the Tobacco Factory, the Royal National Theatre and The Ministry of Entertainment have performed there as well as regular in house productions. The theatre is now recognised by Bristol City Council as a key arts provider. The theatre gained funding from the Arts Council of England for the first time in 2007. The current Artistic Director is Mike Tweddle, appointed in 2016.

== The Café Bar ==
The Tobacco Factory Café Bar opened in November 2001, serving Mediterranean style food in a post-industrial setting. Regular music nights complement the theatre upstairs.

== Sunday market ==
The Tobacco Factory also has every Sunday a market in their car park where stalls come to set up and sell fresh produce, including fish, fruit and vegetables but also takeaway meals and drinks. However, some stalls also sell practical things like scarfs and homemade soaps. Every week the stalls can change.

== Archives ==
Extensive records of W.D. & H.O. Wills, who originally developed the site as a factory for processing tobacco, are held at Bristol Archives (Ref. 38169) (online catalogue).
