= What's Not to Love? =

Studio album by the Nightingales
- Released: 2007
- Recorded: 27–28 January 2007
- Genre: Alternative; rock
- Label: Caroline True
- Producer: Bob Lamb; the Nightingales

The Nightingales chronology
Out of True (2006)	What's Not to Love? (2007)	Insult to Injury (2008)

What's Not to Love? is the fifth studio album by British band the Nightingales. The mini-album was recorded in January 2007 in Birmingham. Along with five original songs, the album contains a cover version of the Murray Wecht composition "Drummer Man", originally recorded by Nancy Sinatra.

== Track listing ==
1. "Plenty of Spare" – 4:52
2. "Eleven Fingers" – 2:24
3. "Bang Out of Order" – 5:18
4. "Drummer Man" – 3:33
5. "Overreactor" – 3:02
6. "Wot No Blog?" – 4:03

== Reception ==
Dave Hoffman of PopMatters rated the album 4/10 stars and called it "completely forgettable". Jennifer Kelly of Dusted Magazine was more positive writing All six songs are killers and It's too complicated to be punk, too hard and fast to be anything else...maybe it's time for the Nightingales to invent their own genre.
