= No Love Lost =

No Love Lost may refer to:

== Literature ==
- No Love Lost (book), a 2003 collection of short stories by Alice Munro
- No Love Lost, a 1997 graphic novel by Ariel Bordeaux
- No Love Lost, a 2001 novel by Eileen Dewhurst
- "No Love Lost", an 1868 poem by William Dean Howells

== Music ==
- No Love Lost, a group on The X Factor: Celebrity, 2019

=== Albums ===
- No Love Lost (Joe Budden album) or the title song, 2013
- No Love Lost (The Nightingales album), 2012
- No Love Lost (The Rifles album), 2006
- No Love Lost, by Kate Schutt, 2007
- No Love Lost, by Omega Tribe, 1983
- No Love Lost, an EP by Blxst, or the title song, 2020

=== Songs ===
- "No Love Lost", by Carcass from Heartwork, 1993
- "No Love Lost", by Corey Hart from Young Man Running, 1988
- "No Love Lost", by IQ from Nomzamo, 1987
- "No Love Lost", by Joy Division from An Ideal for Living, 1978
- "No Love Lost", by Keyshia Cole from The Color Purple
- "No Love Lost", by KeySi, competing to represent Belarus in the Eurovision Song Contest 2019
- "No Love Lost", by Polyrock from Polyrock, 1980
- "No Love Lost", by Shaquille O'Neal from You Can't Stop the Reign, 1996
- "No Love Lost", by the Statler Brothers from Atlanta Blue, 1984
- "No Love Lost", by Yngwie Malmsteen from Magnum Opus, 1995

== See also ==
- "Ain't No Love Lost", a 2006 song by Hadise
- "Ain't No Love Lost", a song by Curtis Mayfield from Got to Find a Way, 1974
