= Perish the Thought =

Studio album by The Nightingales
- Released: 5 October 2018
- Recorded: May 2018
- Genre: Alternative, rock
- Label: Tiny Global Productions
- Producer: Andreas Schmid

The Nightingales chronology
Mind over Matter (2015)	Perish the Thought (2018)	Four Against Fate (2020)

Perish the Thought is the tenth studio album by British band The Nightingales. It was recorded in May 2018 at the Faust Studio, Scheer, Germany.

== Reception ==
"Perish the Thought" received four stars in Mojo where Ben Thompson described the album as "barnstorming". Nick Toczek gave the album four stars in the magazine, Rock'n'Reel, and wrote "... The Nightingales are essential. Not light listening, there's nothing dull or formulaic about this stunning addition to their ever-impressive oeuvre...". John Dale in Uncut magazine gave it 8/10 and described the album as "Tough, bloodied, constructivist anti-pop". Ged Babey of Louder Than War awarded the re-release 9/10 and wrote that the album "is out of step and awkward as ever, but quite possibly their most fully realised album since Out of True". Lorna Irvine of the Wee Review summarized "Difficult, brilliant music for tough times from midlands four-piece" God is in the TV webzine gave the album an 8 and wrote: "A cracking addition to an already scintillating catalogue".

== Track listing ==
1. "Wrong Headed Man"
2. "The World and his Wife"
3. "Enemy of Promise"
4. "Lucky Dip"
5. "Chaff"
6. "Eventually"
7. "Big Dave"
8. "Zero at the Bode"
9. "You Donn't Know What You're Doing"
10. "The Last Minute"
11. "(I'm a) People Person"
12. "It Is"

== Personnel ==
- Robert Lloyd – Vocals
- Andreas Schmid - Bass, keyboards, vocals
- Fliss Kitson – Drums, vocals
- James Smith – Guitar, vocals
