= Talking (The Rifles song) =

Single by The Rifles
- Released: 20 October 2007
- Genre: Indie rock
- Label: 679 Recordings
- Songwriters: Joel Stoker, Lucas Crowther, Robert Pyne, Grant Marsh
- Producer: Dave McCracken

The Rifles singles chronology
"No Love Lost" (2007)	"Talking" (2007)	"I Could Never Lie" (2008)

"Talking" is a single release from British indie rock band The Rifles. It was made available as a free download and on a one-sided 7" vinyl.

The song was given the accolade of 'Hottest Record in the World' by BBC Radio 1 DJ Zane Lowe, and hit number 48 on the UK Singles Chart on downloads alone.

The Rifles released "Talking (New Version)" as a B-side to their single "The Great Escape" on 22 June 2009.

== Track listing ==
- 7" PR017037
1. Talking
