= Jamie Scallion =

British writer and songwriter

- Born: 1 November 1978 (age 47); Cambridge, England
- Education: Creative Writing MA
- Alma mater: Anglia Ruskin University
- Occupations: Novelist, singer, songwriter, screenwriter
- Writing career
- Genre: Young-adult novels
- Notable work: The Rock 'n' Roll Diaries series

Jamie Scallion (born 1 November 1978) is a British singer, songwriter, screenwriter and author. Best known for being the lead singer of Officer Kicks and the writer of The Rock 'n' Roll Diaries.

== Early life ==
Scallion grew up in Greenwich, South East London and as the lead singer of the cult London rock band Officer Kicks played and recorded for over ten years, touring with some of the biggest names in the music industry.

=== Officer Kicks ===
Noel Gallagher gave the band its first break after he heard an early demo in 2001. They went on to record their debut album at his residential studio in Buckinghamshire, Wheeler End. They toured with bands including Ocean Colour Scene, Jack Penate, The View, The Hoosiers, Juliette Lewis, The Rifles and The Script. In 2008, they headlined the Late and Live stage at Glastonbury, the BBC Introducing stage at Bestival and the main stage of the Secret Garden Party. They toured extensively after releasing their second album in 2010. Performing over one hundred shows worldwide. Including a UK and Ireland tour with The Script, a European tour with Juliette Lewis and festivals including Peace and Love, Benicassim and Sonisphere. The band garnered a dedicated live following in the UK and Ireland and were championed and playlisted by the radio station XFM multiple times.

=== The Rock 'n' Roll Diaries ===
Scallion wrote the first of four instalments of The Rock 'n' Roll Diaries whilst on tour. The books, based on his experiences in a rock band, have received hundreds of five star reviews on Amazon and each has held the number one spot on the bestseller list. They have been translated into German, Dutch and French. Scallion co-wrote the soundtrack for the novels with the Irish group The Script. Since being released exclusively on Spotify the tracks have been streamed over a million times. Scallion narrated the Audiobook versions of the books for Audible. Success and strong sales of the books led to Amazon Publishing make a short documentary about Scallion in 2016.

=== Literacy work ===
Scallion has written broadly on the subject of Children's Literacy and in his capacity as an Ambassador for the National Literacy Trust he has co-developed a lyrics based reading initiative that deliverers songwriting workshops into schools nationwide. As well as writing for National newspapers he has written a number of articles for his local paper, the Cambridge Evening News

=== Songwriting and production ===
Along with his brother Alexander Wolfe and Ben Roulston, Scallion is one-third of a songwriting/production team, Crush. The group are based in Central London at Dean Street Studios in Soho, and have worked with many artists including Sam Smith, Florence and the Machine, The Script, Wolf Alice and Jamie Cullum. They wrote the theme tune for the Bafta award-winning film Beast and the original soundtrack for the TV series Flack starring Academy Award winner Anna Paquin. Scallion's music has been featured on TV programmes including Sky Sports, Waterloo Road, Ski Sunday and the Winter Olympics.

=== Education and awards ===
In November 2019 Scallion graduated with distinction from the MA in creative writing at Anglia Ruskin University, Cambridge. In the same year Scallion was shortlisted for the prestigious international writing prize: The Bridport Prize.

=== Family tree ===
Scallion's great-grandfather is the author James Louis Garvin. His grandfather is the French politician Count François de Menthon.
