= In the Good Old Country Way =

1986 album

Studio album by The Nightingales
- Released: 1986
- Recorded: 1986
- Genre: Post-punk
- Label: Vindaloo
- Producer: Graham Dickson

The Nightingales chronology
Hysterics (1983)	In the Good Old Country Way (1986)	Out of True (2006)

In the Good Old Country Way is the third studio album released by British post-punk band The Nightingales. It was released in 1986 through the Vindaloo record label.

== Track listing ==
1. "The Headache Collector" – 2:30
2. "Down in the Dumps" – 4:21
3. "Leave It Out" – 3:59
4. "Comfort & Joy" – 6:58
5. "Coincidence" – 3:55
6. "I Spit In Your Gravy" – 6:43
7. "Square Circle" – 1:27
8. "Part Time Moral England" – 3:49
9. "How To Age" – 6:27
10. "No Can Do" – 3:46

In 2005, it was re-released by Caroline True Records and distributed by Shellshock. It included the following additional tracks:

11. "It's a Cracker" – 3:52
12. "Here We Go Now" – 3:05
13. "Crafty Fag" (Live) – 3:30
14. "What a Carry On" – 3:25
15. "Carry On Carrying On" – 3:16
16. "First My Job" – 3:24
17. "Let's Surf" – 2:55
18. "At The End of the Day" – 3:47
19. "Down in the Dumps #2" – 4:16

== Personnel ==
- Robert Lloyd – lead vocals, mouth organ
- Peter Byrchmore – guitar, keyboards, viola, vocals
- Howard Jenner – bass, penny whistle, vocals
- Maria Smith – violin, synthesizer, vocals
- Ron Collins – drums, percussion, vocals

== Reception ==
In a review of the album in the New Musical Express, David Swift described the band as "well and truly rejuvenated and mixing it with the best of the rest." James Robert described the album as "easily their most polished work".
