= Funeral Stomp =

1990 song by Robert Lloyd

Single by Robert Lloyd

from the album Me and My Mouth
- B-side: "Strayed"
- Released: 26 March 1990
- Length: 3:49
- Label: Virgin
- Songwriter(s): Robert Lloyd; Mark Tibenham
- Producer(s): Andy Richards

Robert Lloyd singles chronology
"Nothing Matters" (1988)	"Funeral Stomp" (1990)	"Nothing Matters" (1990)

"Funeral Stomp" is a song by English singer Robert Lloyd, released in 1990 as the lead single from his debut solo studio album Me and My Mouth. The song was written by Lloyd and Mark Tibenham, and was produced by Andy Richards.

== Background ==
Lloyd embarked on a solo career after the Nightingales disbanded in 1986 and formed a new backing band, the New Four Seasons. Prior to being recorded, "Funeral Stomp" was performed during a BBC Radio 1 session for John Peel on 31 January 1989. In 1989, Lloyd signed with Virgin Records as a solo artist and spent that summer recording a solo studio album. "Funeral Stomp" was released as the album's lead single on 26 March 1990. It failed to reach the top 100 of the UK Singles Chart, but did spend a week at number 18 on Music Week's 'The Other Chart'.

Speaking to Melody Maker in 1990, Lloyd described "Funeral Stomp", "It's a song about the futility of worrying about dying. You should be on a groove instead of all that worrying. That's why the chorus is so jolly, 'cause that's what happens isn't it? You read a few books and lose your looks and then die. It's just a fact. It's not particularly gloomy. The message is, 'Don't be miserable', and that's as old as the hills really." He added to NME, "'Funeral Stomp' is just a simple little true story, but it's smarter than the average lyric – or it appears that way to me."

== Critical reception ==
Upon its release, Terry Staunton of NME called "Funeral Stomp" "perhaps the jolliest miserable record you'll ever hear, dealing as it does with the inevitability that mortal man will one day be dust". He described the lyrics of the chorus as being "so good I could almost forgive Rob for inventing Fuzzbox" and added, "[He's] a maverick talent who's never quite received the accolades he deserves, but hopefully all that will change". Everett True of Melody Maker commented that Lloyd had made an "intelligent, intriguing, blackly humorous, sexy record" and continued, "It's got a bass-joggled dance groove and that's not all! Cool, wazzy keyboards start up and ride the storm, before Robert swoops down with a seriously clear vocal line." Johnny Dee of Record Mirror considered it as "a synthy pop, black humour sing-a-long with a lopsided grin" and "a breezy way to spend four minutes of anyone's life". He noted that the "Christmasy, jingly keyboards sound like they've been sampled off" Jona Lewie's 1980 song "Stop the Cavalry" and Lloyd's vocals have a "similar tone" to Heaven 17's Glenn Gregory. David Giles of Music Week stated that Lloyd, who he praised as "possibly the finest pop lyricist of all time", had returned "in virtually unrecognisable style" with "an uptempo pure pop classic that pours out of the speaks like SAW with PhDs!"

David Ford of the Telegraph & Argus called it a "quite brilliant lyrical celebration of life within a breathtaking array of electro-disco power-pop riffs and rhythms". He added, "Even the great Pet Shop Boys are a poor substitute for this kind of monster." Peter Kinghorn of the Newcastle Evening Chronicle noted that the "title belies this lively danceable pop". Phillip Smith of the Southern Evening Echo wrote, "Despite the title this is an extremely jolly song. Lloyd certainly [has] changed since his days with the Nightingales and this deserves to do well." Dave James of the North Wales Weekly News believed that, on first impression, the title "has tasteless and tacky written all over it", but found the song to be "anything but dislikeable". He wrote, "Lloyd creeps around melodramatically on the sleeve and delivers a powerful lament on vinyl. A title with a difference and a song which is equally surprising." Andrew Hirst of the Huddersfield Daily Examiner called it "the most morbid pop song of the year, laced with such jolly lines as 'tax and death and belly-aches are things to savour'" and continued, "He may be a witty, sarcastic songsmith of no mean stature, but Bob sure doesn't reap in the rewards for the intelligence he pumps out."

== Track listing ==
7–inch single (UK)

1. "Funeral Stomp" – 3:49
2. "Strayed" – 1:51

12-inch single (UK)

1. "Funeral Stomp" – 3:49
2. "Strayed" – 1:51
3. "The Last Laugh" – 4:47

CD single (UK)

1. "Funeral Stomp" – 3:49
2. "Strayed" – 1:51
3. "The Last Laugh" – 4:47
4. "All the Time in the World" – 3:56

== Personnel ==
"Funeral Stomp"

- Robert Lloyd – vocals
- Andy Richards – keyboards, Fairlight programming
- Benedict Fenner – additional keyboards
- Peter Byrchmore – violin
- Luís Jardim – percussion
- Mark Tibenham – backing vocals

Production

- Andy Richards – production ("Funeral Stomp")
- Benedict Fenner – remixing ("Funeral Stomp"), engineering ("Funeral Stomp")
- Robert Lloyd – production ("Strayed", "The Last Laugh")
- Peter Byrchmore – production ("Strayed", "The Last Laugh")
- Mark Bruce – production ("The Last Laugh")
- Mark Tibenham – production ("All the Time in the World")

Other

- Joan Dawson – illustration
- Christof Gstalder – photography

== Charts ==
Chart (1990)	Peak position
UK The Other Chart (Music Week)	18
