= Officer Kicks =

British rock band

- Origin: United Kingdom
- Genres: Rock 'n' roll
- Years active: 2005–present
- Labels: We Make Things
- Members: Jamie Scallion; Jamie Fisher; Keith Wickham; Michael Skorjanec

Officer Kicks are a British rock group who formed in early 2005 in Southeast London.

The band have released two albums to date. They have toured with The Script, Ocean Colour Scene, Jack Penate, The View, The Hoosiers, Juliette Lewis, The Rifles amongst many others. They also headlined the Late and Live stage at Glastonbury, the BBC Introducing stage at Bestival and were amongst the headline acts on the main stage of the Secret Garden Party. In 2010 they completed a twelve date tour of Ireland with The Script and a fourteen date UK tour with Juliette Lewis as well as playing festivals all over Europe including Peace and Love and Sonisphere. The band also played a host of Harley Davidson Ralleys (H.O.G.) all over Europe (Spain, Austria, Portugal, Switzerland, Germany) which included playing with Metallica, Alvin Lee former Ten Years After frontman/lead guitarist, Manfred Mann, Sam Brown and Mötley Crüe.

== History ==
The group consist of school friends Jamie Scallion on vocals, Jamie Fisher on guitar, Michael Skorjanec on bass and Keith Wickham on drums. The name "Officer Kicks" came from a song the band wrote about a police officer in the local area. The band played their first gig in October 2005 at the Dalston Russian Club; the popular website Whisperin' n' Hollerin' gave the gig 10/10.

At the end of October 2007, Officer Kicks were signed to independent label We Make Things and on 23 June 2008 released their debut album The Six Grand Plot.

An early supporter of the band, Noel Gallagher first heard the group after receiving a demo that had been sent to his record label, Big Brother. Two years on he agreed to allow the band to record their debut album at his private studio Wheeler End. Others that have been permitted to record there include Kasabian, The Coral and Paul Weller.

The Six Grand Plot garnered many hard copy reviews most notably from the NME, Clash Magazine and Rock Sound. The first single taken from the album was "Pictures of Me" and gained an XFM Radio playlist, Q Magazine's song of the day and the promo video was played on MTV1 and MTV2. In 2008 they played the UK festivals Glastonbury, Secret Garden Party and Bestival as well as touring the UK a total of five times.

=== Citywide Curfew ===
In 2009, the band began work on their second album at Dean Street Studios in London's Soho. Citywide Curfew was completed in the summer of the same year. "The Kraken" was the first single taken from the record and was also play listed on XFM, Total Rock and Absolute Radio. It also received BBC radio play from Iron Maiden's Bruce Dickinson and featured on the Sky 1's Soccer AM. Many of the songs from Citywide Curfew are regularly used on Sky Sports. The BBC also used Officer Kicks music on the popular TV series Waterloo Road, Ski Sunday and the Winter Olympics.

At the end of 2009, the band completed a twelve date national tour supporting The Script in Ireland and a fourteen date UK tour supporting Juliette Lewis. They were also asked to headline the main stage of Secret Garden Party behind Jarvis Cocker. Harley Davidson flew the band out to Austria to play three shows at their bike rally in Faarkesee. Dave Berry from XFM Radio listed the band in his all-time top ten bands.

Citywide Curfew was released on 12 April 2010. It has a 5/5 rating on iTunes and gained glowing reviews across the board.

The second single taken from the album "Automatic" was also playlisted on XFM Radio and Ireland's Phantom 105.2; it was also the feature video on the popular website Artrocker.com and used on MTV Cribs. Gordon Smart from The Sun newspaper said the band was one to watch out on Vernon Kaye's BBC Radio 1 radio show.

The group was interviewed and performed a session on national radio for the Gethin Jones show on Radio Five live in August 2010. The double A-side single "Hold the Magic"/"2024" was released on 6 September. Officer Kicks are said to be taking 2011 off touring to write the third album and concentrate on home life. A new Officer Kicks record is expected in summer 2015.

== Discography ==
=== Albums ===
| Title | Release date | Label |
|---|---|---|
| Six Grand Plot | 23 June 2008 | We Make Things |
| Citywide Curfew | 12 April 2010 | We Make Things |

=== Singles ===
| Title | Release date | Label |
|---|---|---|
| "Pictures of Me" | 15 June 2008 | We Make Things |
| "Dirty Sally" | 21 September 2008 | We Make Things |
| "The Kraken" | 5 October 2009 | We Make Things |
| "Automatic" | 10 March 2010 | We Make Things |

== Band members ==
- Jamie Scallion – Vocals
- Jamie Fisher – Guitar
- Michael Skorjanec – Bass
- Keith Wickham Drums
