= Pigs on Purpose =

1982 album

Studio album by The Nightingales
- Released: 1982
- Recorded: 6–8 September 1982
- Studio: Outlaw Studios, Birmingham
- Genre: Post-punk
- Length: 40:37 (original UK release 59:26 (2004 re-release)
- Label: Cherry Red
- Producer: Richard Strange

The Nightingales chronology
Pigs on Purpose (1982)	Hysterics (1983)

Professional ratings
Review scores
Source	Rating
Allmusic	4/5 stars

Pigs on Purpose is the first studio album released by British post-punk band The Nightingales. It was released in 1982 through the Cherry Red record label and was distributed by Pinnacle. The album reached #15 in the UK Indie Chart.

James Robert wrote that the album was "a summation of their live set", but "let down by a flat production that didn't do justice to the duelling guitar thrust". Stewart Lee writing in the Sunday Times in 2004 declared the album's reappearance "the CD reissue of the year".

== Track listing ==
1. "Blood For Dirt" - 2:59
2. "Start From Scratch" - 2:24
3. "One Mistake" - 2:40
4. "Well Done, Underdog" - 1:47
5. "The Crunch" - 4:51
6. "The Hedonists Sigh" - 2:25
7. "It Lives Again!" - 3:01
8. "Make Good" - 2:24
9. "Don't Blink" - 3:58
10. "Joking Apart" - 2:17
11. "Yeah, It's O.K." - 5:15
12. "Use Your Loaf" - 2:07
13. "Blisters" - 4:29

The album was re-released in 2004, and included the band's 2nd, 3rd and 4th singles plus their respective b-sides. The debut single, "Idiot Strength", was not included. The additional tracks are:

14. "Inside Out" - 3:01 (B-side to "Use Your Loaf")
15. "Under The Lash" - 2:15 (B-side to "Use Your Loaf")
16. "Paraffin Brain" - 2:57 (3rd single)
17. "Elvis The Last Ten Days" - 2:50 (B-side to "Paraffin Brain")
18. "Urban Ospreys" - 4:26 (4th single)
19. "Cakehole" - 3:20 (B-side to "Urban Ospreys")

== Personnel ==
- Paul Apperley - drums
- Steve Hawkins - bass, vocal
- Andy Lloyd - guitars, vocals
- Nick Beales - guitars, vocals
- Robert Lloyd - vocals, mouth organ
