= Nothing Matters (Robert Lloyd and the New Four Seasons song) =

1988 song by Robert Lloyd and the New Four Seasons

Single by Robert Lloyd and the New Four Seasons
- B-side: "Toccata and Fatigue"
- Released: 17 October 1988
- Length: 3:45
- Label: In Tape
- Songwriter(s): Robert Lloyd; Mark Tibenham; Dave Lowe
- Producer(s): Mark Tibenham

Robert Lloyd and the New Four Seasons singles chronology
"Something Nice" (1988)	"Nothing Matters" (1988)	"Funeral Stomp" (1990)

"Nothing Matters" is a song by English band Robert Lloyd and the New Four Seasons. Written by Lloyd, Mark Tibenham and Dave Lowe, and produced by Tibenham, the song was originally released as a single on 17 October 1988 on the In Tape label and peaked at number 13 in the UK Independent Singles Chart. The song was re-recorded for Lloyd's debut solo album Me and My Mouth, released by Virgin in 1990, with Andy Richards as producer. The new version was released as the second and final single from the album on 23 April 1990.

== 1988 version ==
=== Background ===
Lloyd embarked on a solo career after the Nightingales disbanded in 1986 and formed a new backing band, the New Four Seasons. After performing a BBC Radio 1 session for John Peel in March 1987, Lloyd was approached by the independent label In Tape and subsequently released two singles on the label in 1988, "Something Nice" and "Nothing Matters". Released on 17 October 1988, "Nothing Matters" reached number 13 in the UK Independent Singles Chart.

In a 1988 interview for Music Box's Rockin' in the UK, Lloyd called "Nothing Matters" a "fairly lusty sort of song". He said, "That's what I wanted to write the lyric about: a love song that was verging on the rude side. It reminded me a lot of a 1930 surrealist film called L'Age d'Or by Luis Buñuel. [It's] a pretty obscure thing, but part of this film at least is this couple who are so madly in love with each other that they're blind to the rest of the world. It's very tame nowadays, but they keep attempting to make love and [are] constantly being interrupted. The idea of being so in love with someone that everything else is nothing, you've got to do with a bit of humour." The song's music video also spoofs L'Age d'Or.

=== Critical reception ===
Upon its release, James Brown of NME stated, "Robert and his musicians have clearly been listening to Bowie's Let's Dance LP. Now a lot of you might immediately confine Robert to the 'get well soon section' for this, but I can assure you that once you've got used to the not-too-apocalyptic sounds you find another wee treasure trove of a song. The man may well yet be knighted with a hit." Mick Mercer of Melody Maker wrote, "Well, Roberto's certainly rather forward in his lifestyle! Rather subtle in his songwriting as well. He could well sneak into the charts as Lloyd Cole's intelligent brother. Or Roddy Frame's distressed au pair? A song to put the sparkle back into your earwax." Jerry Smith of Music Week remarked that Lloyd had "come up with yet another surprisingly polished pop single" which is "fizzing with jaunty hooks on a springhead beat that should ensure wide exposure". Julian Baggini of the Reading Evening Post called it a "refreshing treat" with the "rare combination of a commercial song played with finesse by a band who sound like they're actually playing their instruments, rather than leaving it to the computers".

=== Track listing ===
7–inch single (UK)

1. "Nothing Matters" – 3:45
2. "Toccata and Fatigue" – 1:32

12-inch single (UK)

1. "Nothing Matters" – 6:40
2. "Toccata and Fatigue" – 1:32
3. "Mr. Superior" – 3:25

=== Personnel ===
Robert Lloyd and the New Four Seasons

- Robert Lloyd – vocals
- Mark Tibenham – keyboards, backing vocals
- Dave Lowe – guitar, backing vocals
- Micky Harris – bass guitar
- Mark Fletcher – drums

Additional musicians

- Leigh – backing vocals
- Roger Morton – saxophone

Production

- Mark Tibenham – production ("Nothing Matters")
- Dave Lowe – production ("Toccata and Fatigue")

Other

- Luis Buñuel – stills from L'Age d'Or (courtesy of Essential Cinema)

=== Charts ===
Chart (1988)	Peak position
UK Independent Singles Chart	13

== 1990 version ==
"Nothing Matters"

Single by Robert Lloyd

from the album Me and My Mouth
- B-side: "Mama Nature's Skin"
- Released: 23 April 1990
- Length: 3:54
- Label: Virgin
- Songwriter(s): Robert Lloyd; Mark Tibenham; Dave Lowe
- Producer(s): Andy Richards

Robert Lloyd singles chronology
"Funeral Stomp" (1990)	"Nothing Matters" (1990)

The 1988 release of "Nothing Matters" generated interest from a number of major labels, including Virgin, Atlantic and London, and Lloyd chose to sign with Virgin as a solo artist in 1989. That year, he recorded his debut solo studio album, Me and My Mouth, which was released in June 1990. A new version of "Nothing Matters", with Andy Richards as producer, was released as the album's second and final single on 23 April 1990, but it failed to reach the top 100 of the UK Singles Chart.

=== Critical reception ===
Upon its release, David Quantick of NME labelled "Nothing Matters" as "shag of the week" and wrote, "'Spare me logic – gimme a kiss' orders Bob and, over-awed, the world tongue-wrestles him into a spittly clinch. Whole shopping centres fill with love juice as 'Nothing Matters' performs the act of love on a by now somewhat slithery nation and Rob's tongue snake-rides the land on a mission of pop love." Attila the Stockbroker, writing for The Guardian, praised it as a "welcome return" from Lloyd and a "marvellous single" which is "reminiscent of Dollar in their existentialist period". He added, "Now Lloyd in the charts would be something to see, and judging by the airplay there's every chance with this one." Simon Lloyd of the Reading Evening Post described it as "a nice, pacey, tightly composed love song" which is "very conventional pop music, but otherwise savagely infectious".

David Owens of the South Wales Echo awarded the song three and three quarters stars and noted it is "bubbling over with infectious, happy-go-lucky rhyming choruses and Lloyd's brisk vocals". He added, "It seems the ex-Nightingales frontman is finally learning the art of consumer pop styles and thankfully it's not at the expense of the song either. It could and should be a hit." Kevin Bryan of the Paisley Daily Express commented, "'Nothing Matters' is arguably the most polished and commercial 45 that he's recorded to date. I hope that it's a great success, but I have my doubts." Phillip Smith of the Southern Evening Echo called it a "strong follow-up" to "Funeral Stomp". Jon Wilde of Melody Maker was negative in his review, writing, "Seem to remember a beer and skittles version of this coming out two years back. It was frigging useless then and it's even more so now given the Billy Joel production. Those chancers at Virgin Records obviously fancy sneaking him into the charts as a thinking man's Roger Daltrey."

=== Track listing ===
7–inch and cassette single (UK)

1. "Nothing Matters" – 3:54
2. "Mama Nature's Skin" – 2:38

12-inch single (UK)

1. "Nothing Matters" – 3:54
2. "Mama Nature's Skin" – 2:38
3. "The Race Is On" – 1:52

CD single (UK)

1. "Nothing Matters" – 3:54
2. "Mama Nature's Skin" – 2:38
3. "The Race Is On" – 1:52
4. "Something Nice" (recorded for the John Peel Show) – 7:06

=== Personnel ===
"Nothing Matters"

- Robert Lloyd – vocals
- Andy Richards – keyboards, Fairlight programming
- Neil Taylor – electric guitar
- Chas Cronk – acoustic guitar
- Luís Jardim – percussion
- Mark Tibenham – backing vocals
- Magda – backing vocals
- Dave Lowe – additional vocals
- Cara Tivey – additional vocals
- Beverley Brown – additional vocals

Production

- Andy Richards – production ("Nothing Matters")
- Benedict Fenner – engineering ("Nothing Matters")
- Mark Tibenham – production ("Mama Nature's Skin")
- Robert Lloyd – production ("The Race Is On")
- Peter Byrchmore – production ("The Race Is On")
- Dale Griffin – production ("Something Nice")
- Mike Robinson – engineering ("Something Nice")
- Mike Shilling – engineering ("Something Nice")

Other

- Christof Gstalder – photography
- Stylorouge – design
