= Something Nice (song) =

1988 song by Robert Lloyd and the New Four Seasons

Single by Robert Lloyd and the New Four Seasons

from the album Me and My Mouth
- B-side: "All the Time in the World"
- Released: 1988
- Length: 4:05
- Label: In Tape
- Songwriter(s): Robert Lloyd
- Producer(s): Mark Tibenham

Robert Lloyd and the New Four Seasons singles chronology
"Something Nice" (1988)	"Nothing Matters" (1988)

"Something Nice" is a song by English band Robert Lloyd and the New Four Seasons. Written by Lloyd and produced by Mark Tibenham, the song was originally released as a single in 1988 on the In Tape label and peaked at number 5 in the UK Independent Singles Chart. The song was also included on Lloyd's debut solo album, Me and My Mouth, released by Virgin in 1990.

== Background ==
Lloyd embarked on a solo career after the Nightingales disbanded in 1986 and formed a new backing band, the New Four Seasons. "Something Nice" was first performed during a BBC Radio 1 session for John Peel on 10 March 1987. Following its broadcast, Lloyd was approached by the independent label In Tape with an offer to record and release the track as a single. Released in June 1988, "Something Nice" reached number 5 in the UK Independent Singles Chart. The single marked a move towards a pop-orientated sound, with Lloyd telling Record Mirror in 1988, "I've always liked all sorts of different styles of music and I just fancied a go at this sort of thing at the moment. When we did [the song] for the Peel thing, it was a lot more like the Velvet Underground, but we decided to pep it up a bit for the single."

Speaking to NME in 1988, Lloyd revealed the song's inception,

"I wrote the song when I was ill in bed and on my own. I had a lot of things on my mind. I'm not a hypochondriac or a manic depressive or anything, but I am the sort of person who tends to feel a bit sorry for myself. I've got a little dictating machine, and I just recited all this stuff into it and then went to sleep. The next morning, I listened to it, and I thought it was pretty cringeworthy, but then I thought 'f--- it', I know it sounds pretentious, but it was a true record of exactly what I felt at that particular point. I thought it was honest. Whatever people might think of me, I don't care, even if some of it's embarrassing, I'm going to keep the whole thing. However well you might be doing or however happy you are, you always think about the things you're not doing. But it's also a very genuine emotion; it's global, people feeling pissed off."

The full-length version of the song, released on the 12-inch format, has a duration of nine minutes and includes additional verses compared to the 7-inch version. Lloyd told NME, "I think the 12-inch is a bit boring. That little riff gets on your nerves after a while, but I'd sooner have a potentially boring full-length version with all the words. It's the lyrics that are important."

== Critical reception ==
Upon its release as a single, James Brown of NME picked "Something Nice" as the magazine's "single of the week". He called it "an addictive single jam-packed with lyrics, brass, organs, and harps" and remarked that Lloyd had "written the classic post-Motown/post-Nightingales song we could all do with right now". He continued, "'Something Nice' bathes the worries of a mid-life crisis in a stream of up-tempo and undulating brilliance. It could be a sitcom soundtrack, it could be a Pete Waterman production, it should be a hit." Chris Roberts of Melody Maker praised it as "splendid" and "far, far sassier than anything the Nightingales ever blubbered". He noted that the music "ladders the stockings of the The, the Stranglers, and the Style Council, but gets right all the pop tricks those simpletons get wrong" and added of the lyrics, "I can relate to every word of this and I'm sure 99 per cent of our immensely intelligent readers can too." Andrew Hirst of the Huddersfield Daily Examiner commented, "The good old northern soul/Motown beat provides the perfect backdrop to Lloyd's articulate and intelligent vocals."

== Track listing ==
7–inch single (UK)

1. "Something Nice" – 4:05
2. "All the Time in the World" – 3:50

12-inch single (UK)

1. "Something Nice" – 8:58
2. "Of Course You Can't" – 3:11
3. "All the Time in the World" – 3:59

== Personnel ==
Robert Lloyd and the New Four Seasons

- Robert Lloyd – vocals
- Cara Tivey – piano, backing vocals
- Dave Lowe – guitar, backing vocals
- Micky Harris – bass guitar
- Mark Fletcher – drums

Additional musicians

- Paul Simms – flugelhorn

Production

- Mark Tibenham – production

Other

- Joan Dawson – cover paintings

== Charts ==
Chart (1988)	Peak position
UK Independent Singles Chart	5
