= For Fuck's Sake =

2014 film

For Fuck's Sakes

Studio album by The Nightingales
- Released: 2014
- Recorded: September 2013
- Genre: Alternative rock
- Label: Self-released
- Producer: The Nightingales

The Nightingales chronology
No Love Lost (2012)	For Fuck's Sakes (2014)	Mind Over Matter (2015)

For Fuck's Sake is the eighth studio album by British band The Nightingales. The album was a limited edition self-release and was recorded in September 2013 at the Faust Studio, Scheer, Germany.

== Track listing ==
1. "Bullet For Gove"
2. "Diary Of A Bag Of Nerves"
3. "The Gruesome Threesome"
4. "Toasted On Both"
5. "The Abstract Dad"
6. "Good Morning And Goodbye"
7. "His Family Has Been Informed"
8. "Dumb And Drummer"
9. "Thick And Thin"
10. "Contempt"
11. "Same Old"
12. "Good Morning Midnight"

== Personnel ==
- Robert Lloyd – Vocals
- Alan Apperley – Guitars
- Fliss Kitson – Drums
- Andreas Schmid - Bass

== Reception ==
Joe Shooman of Record Collector awarded the album 4/5 and wrote "... as the title indicates, the band are in no mood to mess around. The result is that ace lyrics, riffs and ideas burst out from all angles". Hayley Scott rated it 7/10 for Line of Best Fit and wrote "Its allure is not immediately perceptible – it takes time to win you over, but it withstands repeated listens; its appeal never waning but heightening with perseverance". In Mojo it was given 4/5 and described as "Heartening evidence of the British art of mentally transforming ennui and chagrin into something approaching gold".
