= Mind and matter =

Mind and matter may refer to:

- "Mind and Matter", a 1956 lecture by Erwin Schrödinger
- "Mind and Matter", a 1950 essay by Bertrand Russell
- Mind & Matter, a 2018 album by Collide
- "The Mind and the Matter", a 1961 episode of The Twilight Zone

== See also ==
- Mind–body problem
- Mind over matter (disambiguation)
