= Insult to Injury (The Nightingales album) =

2008 film

Studio album by The Nightingales
- Released: 2008
- Recorded: 17–23 March 2008
- Genre: Alternative, rock
- Label: Klangbad Records
- Producer: Hans-Joachim Lemler & The Nightingales

The Nightingales chronology
What's Not To Love? (2007)	Insult to Injury (2008)	No Love Lost (2012)

Insult to Injury is the sixth studio album by British band The Nightingales. The album was recorded in March 2008 at the Faust Studio, Scheer, Germany.

== Track listing ==
1. "I Am Grimaldi"
2. "Old Fruit"
3. "Double Whammy Bar"
4. "Brownhills United's Tattooed Southpaw"
5. "Little Lambs"
6. "Kirklees Ken"
7. "Big Bones"
8. "Crap Lech"
9. "Former Florist to The Queen"
10. "The Kiss of Life"
11. "Down With The Blue Lobsters"
12. "Watch Your Posture"

== Personnel ==
- Robert Lloyd – Vocals and mouth organ
- Alan Apperley – Guitars, bass, keyboard, vocals
- Daren Garratt – Drums, percussion, and melodeon
- Matt Wood – Guitars, bass, and stylophone

== Reception ==
Metacritic, a review aggregator that assigns a normalized score, rated it 59/100 based on four reviews. Ben Thompson of The Observer rated it 4/5 stars and called it Lloyd's "freshest and most subtly intoxicating work to date."
