= Local Boy =

Single by The Rifles

from the album No Love Lost
- Released: August 2005
- Genre: Indie rock
- Label: Right Hook Recordings
- Songwriters: Joel Stoker, Lucas Crowther, Robert Pyne, Grant Marsh

The Rifles singles chronology
"When I'm Alone" (2005)	"Local Boy" (2005)	"Repeated Offender" (2006)

Alternative cover
- Cover of the Limited Edition version.

"Local Boy" is the second single from the British indie rock band The Rifles, from their debut record No Love Lost. The single was released via Right Hook Recordings in November 2005 and reached number 36 in the UK singles chart.

== Track listings ==
7" RHK0017
No.	Title	Length
1.	"Local Boy"
2.	"Local Boy (Acoustic)"

7" RHK001LTD7 Limited Edition (1000 copies)
No.	Title	Length
1.	"Local Boy"
2.	"Rock the Boat / Beautiful Music"

CDS B000BGR2ZY
No.	Title	Length
1.	"Local Boy"
2.	"Down South"

== Charts ==
Chart (2005)	Peak position
UK Indie (Official Charts)	5
UK Singles (Official Charts)	36
