= The Cropredy Box =

Live album by Fairport Convention
- Released: 23 March 1999
- Recorded: 8–9 August 1997
- Genre: Folk rock
- Length: 183:23
- Label: Mooncrest Records CRESTBCD 02
- Producer: Dave Pegg, Simon Nicol

Professional ratings
Review scores
Source	Rating
Allmusic	2.5/5 stars

The Cropredy Box is an album by Fairport Convention recorded at their annual live concert in Cropredy, Oxfordshire, England to celebrate the band's thirtieth anniversary in 1997. Featuring many songs for which the band had become noted, the set also features performances from many former members including violinist Dave Swarbrick and original vocalist Judy Dyble. Commentary is provided by their first manager, Joe Boyd, and Ashley Hutchings.

The album was packaged as three-CD boxed set including a booklet which featured a description of the compilation by Simon Nicol, track listings, and photographs from the concert itself. Extras were a track recorded for a Ken Russell documentary film about traditional music, and a prank phone call to Dave Swarbrick which had circulated on tape amongst the band's fans for many years.

== Track listing ==
=== Disc one ===
1. "Intro" - Rory McLeod introduces Joe Boyd (4:56)
2. "Wings" (Hutchings, Nicol) (4:30)
3. "Jack O'Diamonds" (vocals- Judy Dyble) (Carruthers, Dylan) (3:37)
4. "Time Will Show the Wiser" (Emitt Rhodes) (3:14)
5. "Mr. Lacey" (vocals - Vikki Clayton) (Hutchings) (3:11)
6. "Suzanne" (Cohen) (7:05)
7. "Genesis Hall" (Thompson) (3:51)
8. "Million Dollar Bash" (Dylan, Hutchings) (4:27)
9. "Come all Ye" (Denny, Hutchings) (5:23)
10. "Reynardine" (Traditional) (3:57)
11. "Matty Groves" (Traditional) (7:38)

=== Disc two ===
1. "Danny Boy" (Traditional arr. spontaneously) (3:11)
2. "Intro" - Ashley Hutchings (8:24)
3. "Walk Awhile" (Thompson, Swarbrick) (4:29)
4. "Now Be Thankful" (Thompson, Swarbrick) (3:49)
5. "Poor Will and the Jolly Hangman" (Thompson, Swarbrick) (7:32)
6. "Angel Delight" (Swarbrick, Pegg, Nicol, Mattacks) (4:38)
7. "Rain" (Lennon, McCartney) (vocals - Dan Ar Braz) (7:30)
8. "Cut Across Shorty" (Wilkin, Walker) (5:41)
9. "Sloth" (Thompson, Swarbrick) (13:06)
10. "Rosie" (Swarbrick) (6:02)
11. "Solo" (Denny) (vocals - Cathy LeSurf) (5:23)

=== Disc three ===
1. "John Barleycorn" (Traditional) (11:29)
2. "Wat Tyler" (McTell, Nicol) (6:37)
3. "Red and Gold" (McTell) (6:56)
4. "Jewel in the Crown" (Julie Matthews) (4:13)
5. "Woodworm Swing" (Sanders) (5:10)
6. "John Gaudie" (incl. "John Gaudie", "Jack Brook Da Prison Door", "Donald Blue" & "The Bonnie Isle O'Whalsay") (Trad. arr Chris Leslie) (5:38)
7. "Fiddlestix" (Trad. arr Swarbrick) (3:09)
8. "Dirty Linen" (Trad. arr Swarbrick) (6:36)
9. "Si Tu Dois Partir" (Dylan) (4:10)
10. "Meet on the Ledge" (Thompson) (7:31)

==== Bonus tracks ====
1. "Seventeen Come Sunday" (Trad. arr Nicol, Pegg, Mattacks, Sanders, Leslie Westbury, Woodworm) (3:07)
2. "The April Fool Tape" (5:23)

- participants: Sergeant McLeod played by Simon Nicol, Mrs Gloria Swarbrick, David Swarbrick

== Personnel ==
- Simon Nicol - Vocals, Acoustic & Electric Guitars
- Richard Thompson - Vocals, Electric Guitar
- Ashley Hutchings - Vocals, Bass Guitar
- Dave Mattacks - Drums
- Judy Dyble - Vocals, Recorder
- Dave Swarbrick - Fiddle, Mandolin, Vocals
- Dave Pegg - Bass Guitar, Vocals
- Dan Ar Braz - Electric Guitar, Vocals
- Chris Leslie - Vocals, Batocaster!, Bouzouki, Mandolin
- Maartin Allcock - Keyboards, Vocals, Electric Guitar, Acoustic Guitar
- Jerry Donahue - Electric Guitar
- Bruce Rowland - Tambourine
- Ric Sanders - Violin, Keyboards

=== Additional vocals ===
- Vikki Clayton
- Ralph McTell
- Cathy Lesurf
- Martin Carthy
- Norma Waterson
- Chris While
- Julie Matthews
- Heather Wood
- Gill Allcock
- Jacqui McShee
