= Peace & Quiet =

2005 single by The Rifles

- Generic Blow Up Records die-cut sleeve with The Rifles 7".

Single by The Rifles
- B-side: "Breakdown"
- Released: 13 March 2005
- Genre: Indie rock
- Label: Blow Up Records
- Songwriters: Joel Stoker, Lucas Crowther, Robert Pyne, Grant Marsh
- Producers: Nick Addison; Graham Dominy

The Rifles singles chronology
"Peace & Quiet" (2005)	"When I'm Alone" (2005)

"Peace & Quiet (2006 Re-release)"

Single by The Rifles

from the album No Love Lost
- Released: 16 October 2006
- Genre: Indie rock
- Label: Red Ink
- Songwriters: Joel Stoker, Lucas Crowther, Robert Pyne, Grant Marsh
- Producer: Ian Broudie

The Rifles singles chronology
"She's Got Standards" (2006)	"Peace & Quiet (2006 Re-release)" (2006)	"No Love Lost" (2007)

"Peace & Quiet" was the first official release from the British indie rock band The Rifles. It was released only on 7" by Blow Up Records and was limited to only 1000 copies. Upon hearing a demo of "Peace & Quiet" in late 2004, BBC Radio 1 host Zane Lowe immediately invited The Rifles to the Radio 1 studios to record a session, which aired in December of that year.

The song was then re-recorded and released later by Red Ink as the fifth and final single, from their debut record No Love Lost. The single was released in October 2006 and peaked at number 48 on the UK Singles Chart.

"Peace & Quiet" also featured in the episode "Return to Sender" of the TV series FM.

== Track listing ==
=== Blow Up Records release ===
7" BU029
No.	Title	Length
1.	"Peace & Quiet"	2:44
2.	"Breakdown"	3:28

=== Red Ink (re-issue) ===
7" 82876897637
No.	Title	Length
1.	"Peace & Quiet"	2:44
2.	"She's the Only One" (Acoustic demo)	2:20

7" 82876897647
No.	Title	Length
1.	"Peace & Quiet"	2:44
2.	"Peace & Quiet (Piano version)"	2:42

CDS 82876897652
No.	Title	Length
1.	"Peace & Quiet"	2:44
2.	"Up Close"
