= Live at Shepherds Bush Empire (EP) =

EP by The Rifles
- Released: 4 October 2007
- Recorded: 2007
- Genre: Indie rock
- Producer: Concert Live

The Rifles chronology
Live at Shepherds Bush Empire (2007)	The Rifles EP (2008)

Live at Shepherds Bush Empire is a live EP by British indie rock band The Rifles. Released on October 4, 2007, it features recordings from The Rifles' live show at Shepherds Bush Empire in London, England. The album was released as a 'stop-gap' between their debut album and their second record. The EP was produced by Concert Live and limited to 1,000 copies.

== Track listing ==
All tracks are written by The Rifles.

No.	Title	Length
1.	"Talking (Live)"	3:24
2.	"Robin Hood (Live)"	2:12
3.	"Up Close (Live)"	3:28
4.	"Peace & Quiet (Live)"	2:57
5.	"Narrow Minded Social Club (Live)"	3:05
Total length:		14:26
