= Freedom Run =

Studio album by The Rifles
- Released: 19 September 2011
- Recorded: 2011
- Genre: Indie rock
- Label: ATC Management
- Producers: Charles Rees and Chris Potter

The Rifles chronology
Great Escape (2009)	Freedom Run (2011)	None the Wiser (2014)

Singles from Freedom Run
- 1. "Tangled Up in Love" Released: August 16, 2011; 2. "Sweetest Thing" Released: January 16, 2012

Freedom Run is the third studio album by The Rifles released 19 September 2011, produced by Charles Rees and Chris Potter. On 2 August 2011 The Rifles announced that the first single from the album would be "Tangled Up in Love".

== Track listing ==
All tracks are written by Joel Stoker and Lucas Crowther.

No.	Title	Length
1.	"Dreamer"	3:51
2.	"Long Walk Back"	3:35
3.	"Sweetest Thing"	3:32
4.	"Tangled Up in Love"	3:51
5.	"Eveline"	2:10
6.	"Love is a Key"	4:15
7.	"Falling"	3:27
8.	"(Interlude)"	1:18
9.	"Nothing Matters"	3:53
10.	"Coming Home"	3:43
11.	"I Get Low"	2:53
12.	"Little Boy Blue (Human Needs)"	6:44
13.	"Cry Baby"	3:21
14.	"Emily (iTunes Bonus Track)"	3:29
