= Mind over matter (disambiguation) =

Mind over matter is a popular phrase with paranormal, spiritual, and philosophical uses.

Mind over Matter may also refer to:

== Music ==
- Mind over Matter (band), an Australian hip hop duo

=== Albums ===
- Mind over Matter (The Nightingales album), 2015
- Mind over Matter (Young the Giant album) or the title song, 2014
- Mind over Matter (Zion I album), 2000
- Mind over Matter, by George Bellas, accompanied by Deen Castronovo and Matt Guillory, 1998
- Mind over Matter, by Mark Shim, 1998
- Mind over Matter, by Mark Williams, 1992
- Mind over Matter, a comedy album, or the musical title track, by Robert Klein, 1974

=== Songs ===
- "Mind over Matter" (E. G. Daily song), 1987
- "Mind over Matter", composed by the Sherman Brothers for the film Winnie the Pooh and the Honey Tree, 1966
- "Mind over Matter", by Del Shannon, 1967; released on Home and Away, 2012
- "Mind over Matter", by Ice-T from O.G. Original Gangster, 1991
- "Mind over Matter", by Iron Savior from Unification, 1999
- "Mind over Matter", by Split Enz from Frenzy, 1979

== Television episodes ==
- "Mind over Matter" (Birds of a Feather)
- "Mind over Matter" (The Outer Limits)
