= No Love Lost (The Nightingales album) =

2012 film

Studio album by The Nightingales
- Released: 2012
- Recorded: December 2011
- Genre: Alternative, rock
- Label: Cooking Vinyl
- Producer: The Nightingales

The Nightingales chronology
| Insult to Injury (2008) | No Love Lost (2012) | For Fuck's Sake (2014) |

No Love Lost is the seventh studio album by British band The Nightingales. The album was recorded in December 2011 at the Faust Studio, Scheer, Germany.

== Track listing ==
1. "Ace Of Hearts"
2. "Born Yesterday"
3. "The Done Thing"
4. "Real Gone Daddy"
5. "Best Of British Luck"
6. "Say It With Flowers"
7. "The Burster"
8. "The Dishwater Kid"
9. "Someone For Everyone"
10. "Sentimental Dunce"
11. "Mutton To Lamb"
12. "The World of Nothing Really"
13. "Dick The Do-Gooder"

== Personnel ==
- Robert Lloyd – Vocals
- Alan Apperley – Guitars, metal, vocals
- Fliss Kitson – Drums, vocals, metal
- Andreas Schmid - Bass, metal, percussion, vocals
- Matt Wood – Guitars

== Reception ==
"No Love Lost" was described by Mojo as "Brilliant. One of the fiercest and most exhilarating rock records in ages". Ged Babey of Louder Than War made it "Album of the Day" and wrote "Its loud, its rude, it kicks like a mule and its astounding that the Nightingales have made one of the best albums of the year in 2012".

== Re-release ==
The album was re-released as a double vinyl LP in November 2019 with the following additional tracks, all of which are cover versions,

1. "The Book Of Right On"
2. "That's What You Get Girl"
3. "Unpretty"
4. "I Can Only Give You Everything"
5. "I Just Want Someone To Fall In Love With"

Ged Babey of Louder Than War awarded the re-release 10/10 and wrote "I’d say that this is ‘re-issue of the year’, even though its only seven years old, it sounds better now than the day it came out".
