= The Rifles (EP) =

The Rifles EP

EP by the Rifles
- Released: 15 December 2008
- Recorded: 2007–2008
- Genre: Indie rock
- Label: 679
- Producer: Ian Broudie

The Rifles chronology
| Live at Shepherds Bush Empire (2007) | The Rifles EP (2008) | Great Escape (2009) |

The Rifles EP is the second EP by British indie rock band the Rifles and first non-live EP. Released on 15 December 2008 it features the singles "The Great Escape" and "I Could Never Lie".

The EP was made available in North America for download on 28 July 2009 via Nettwerk Music Group, although its name was changed to "The Great Escape EP".

== Track listing ==
All tracks are written by The Rifles.

| No. | Title | Length |
|---|---|---|
| 1. | "The Great Escape" | 3:26 |
| 2. | "Darling Girl" | 4:08 |
| 3. | "I Could Never Lie" | 3:24 |
| 4. | "A Love to Die For" | 2:19 |
