= None the Wiser =

Studio album by The Rifles
- Released: 27 January 2014
- Recorded: 2011
- Genre: Indie rock
- Label: Cooking Vinyl.
- Producers: Dave McCracken, Jamie Ellis, and Charles Rees

The Rifles chronology
Freedom Run (2011)	None the Wiser (2014)

Singles from None the Wiser
- 1. "Heebie Jeebies"

None the Wiser is the fourth studio album by The Rifles released 26 January 2014, produced by Dave McCracken, Jamie Ellis, and Charles Rees.

== Track listing ==
All tracks are written by Joel Stoker and Lucas Crowther.

No.	Title	Length
1.	"Minute Mile"	3:37
2.	"Heebie Jeebies"	1:59
3.	"Go Lucky"	3:21
4.	"All I Need"	3:05
5.	"You Win Some"	3:40
6.	"Catch Her in the Rye"	4:29
7.	"The Hardest Place to Find Me"	4:01
8.	"Shoot from the Lip"	3:15
9.	"Eclectic Eccentric"	3:26
10.	"Under and Over"	8:27

- The last track contains a hidden track titled "On Top of the World".
