= Repeated Offender =

Single by The Rifles

from the album No Love Lost
- Released: 6 March 2006
- Genre: Indie rock
- Label: Red Ink
- Songwriters: Joel Stoker, Lucas Crowther, Robert Pyne, Grant Marsh

The Rifles singles chronology
"Local Boy" (2005)	"Repeated Offender" (2006)	"She's Got Standards" (2006)

"Repeated Offender" is the third single from the British indie rock band The Rifles, from their debut record No Love Lost. The single was released in March 2006 and reached number 26 in the UK singles chart, making it the band's biggest hit to date. The song was also number 1 in the UK indie charts for the week of 12 March.

== Track listings ==
7" 82876786927 with lyrics on inside sleeve
No.	Title	Length
1.	"Repeated Offender"
2.	"Fighting"

7" 82876786937 with poster
No.	Title	Length
1.	"Repeated Offender"
2.	"Repeated Offender (Acoustic)"

CDS 82876786922
No.	Title	Length
1.	"Repeated Offender"
2.	"Rainy Monday"
