= Out of True =

2006 album

Studio album by The Nightingales
- Released: 2 October 2006
- Recorded: June 2006
- Genres: Alternative, rock
- Length: 59:11
- Label: Iron Man Records
- Producers: Bob Lamb and The Nightingales

The Nightingales chronology
In The Good Old Country Way (1986)	Out of True (2006)	What's Not To Love? (2007)

Out of True is the fourth studio album by British band The Nightingales. Released in the United Kingdom on 2 October 2006, the album is the band's first since 1986's In The Good Old Country Way. The album was recorded in June 2006 in Birmingham. The album contains 3 cover versions, "Let's Think About Living" by Bob Luman, "Good Boy" by Kevin Coyne and "There's A New World Just Opening For Me" by Ray Davies. The song "Good Boy" had previously been covered by frontman Robert Lloyd for a John Peel Session in 1990. The rest of the tracks on the album were written by Robert Lloyd with various members of the past and present lineups of The Nightingales.

== Track listing ==
1. "Born Again in Birmingham" – 4:38
2. "The Chorus Is The Title" – 4:00
3. "Carry On Up The Ante" – 3:08
4. "Hard Up (Buffering 87% Completed)" – 5:26
5. "Taking Away the Stigma of Free School Dinners" – 7:33
6. "Company Man" – 2:03
7. "UK Randy Mom Epidemic" – 3:19
8. "Fifty Fifty" – 5:46
9. "Let's Think About Living" – 2:30
10. "Black Country" – 6:16
11. "Good Boy" – 3:19
12. "Workshy Wunderkind" – 3:32
13. "Rocket Pool via Rough Hills" – 5:58
14. "There's a New World Just Opening for Me" – 4:23

== Personnel ==
- Robert Lloyd – Lead Vocals
- Alan Apperley – Guitars, Vocals
- Daren Garratt – Drums, Percussion
- Matt Wood – Guitars, Vocals
- Ste Lowe – Bass
- Gina Birch – Lead Vocals on "Black Country"
- Poppy and The Jezebels – Vocals on "Carry On Up The Ante"
- Brett Richardson – Bassoon
- Bob Lamb – Drums, Vocals
- Stewart Brackley – Double Bass

Richardson, Lamb, and Brackley only appear on certain tracks.

== Reception ==
Jennifer Kelly of PopMatters called the album "brash, sardonic, and wonderful".

Ben Thompson of The Daily Telegraph wrote "This is that rarest of achievements: a comeback album that actually adds to an already illustrious reputation. ... Out of True finds the Nightingales not merely back to their best, but actually improved."
