= Me and My Mouth =

Studio album by Robert Lloyd
- Released: 4 June 1990
- Length: 44:31
- Label: Virgin
- Producer: Craig Leon; Andy Richards; Mark Tibenham; Dale Griffin

Me and My Mouth (stylised as Me And My Mouth!?❊) is the debut solo studio album by English singer Robert Lloyd, released by Virgin on 4 June 1990.

== Background ==
Lloyd embarked on a solo career after the Nightingales disbanded in 1986. He signed with the independent label In Tape and released two singles in 1988, "Something Nice" and "Nothing Matters", under the name Robert Lloyd and the New Four Seasons. Both singles entered the UK Independent Singles Chart, peaking at number 5 and number 13 respectively. "Nothing Matters" generated interest from a number of major labels, including Virgin, Atlantic and London, and Lloyd chose to sign with Virgin in 1989. He recalled to Record Collector in 2020, "I liked the idea of going with Virgin because they'd put out records by Kevin Coyne and Captain Beefheart. They also stressed they were keen to nurture their artists, which was an attractive proposition, so I went with them."

Lloyd spent the summer of 1989 recording Me and My Mouth. Its release was preceded by the album's two singles, "Funeral Stomp" on 26 March 1990 and "Nothing Matters" on 23 April 1990. The release of Me and My Mouth followed on 4 June 1990, but neither the album or its two singles entered the top 100 of the UK charts. Following the disappointing commercial reception, Virgin dropped Lloyd from their roster in 1991.

== Critical reception ==
Professional ratings
Review scores
Source	Rating
NME	7/10
Record Mirror	3.5/5 stars

Upon its release, Lisa Tilston of Record Mirror stated that, on his "polished debut album", Lloyd "assumes the guise of matinée idol" on several tracks, whereas others see him "slip into his alter ego as purveyor of daft songs and silly sagas to the masses". She singled out "Top Floor to Let" and "Funeral Stomp" as "great examples of his madcap jiggety folk rhythms and tongue twisters" and concluded, "It sometimes sounds as if Lloyd's not sure if he wants to be a serious singer or a comedian. Actually it doesn't matter at all; he carries off both roles with consummate skill." Fred Dellar, writing for Hi-Fi News & Record Review, noted that Lloyd had "produced one of the most unpretentious albums of the year" and believed he should "deservedly reap some rewards for his pure pop way of things, for Me and My Mouth is nothing if not entertaining."

Andrew Collins of NME said that, despite the "expenso-production" and "mainstream MOR padding", Lloyd is "a fine songwriter, whatever studio trickery they throw at him" and added that the range of musical styles "prov[e] that the doomy fatalism in a lot of his lyrics spells carefree costume-changing rather than bedsit introspection". He concluded, "Herein you'll hear more intelligent, playful pop than your dance-addled body will be ready for." Simon Rushton of the Plymouth Evening Herald described it as "safe pop music with cutting lyrics that are very listenable" and believed it "needs a couple of plays to get into but Lloyd's attitude is worth the risk".

Ian Gittins of Melody Maker considered most of the album to be "staggeringly ordinary" and wrote, "I'm sure Lloyd's much-vaunted, and genuinely engaging, eccentricity is bubbling under these surfaces but it's too submerged and, quite frankly, it's not worth labouring through his music to find it. Faced by upful brassy blares, layered strings or horrid jerky guitar, he's unsure how to cope. He tries to make his jokes and remind us how clever he is, but finds the music around him so smooth and sedate he can hardly leave a mark." Trouser Press retrospectively stated that the album has "such a huge, glossy sound that it could pass for a Todd Rundgren job" and "simply isn't the right setting for Lloyd's talents". They added that "The Part of the Anchor" was "easily the highlight" as "the only cut to approach the raw urgency of the 'Gales or Lloyd's lyrical potential".

== Track listing ==
All tracks are written by Robert Lloyd except where noted

No.	Title	Writer(s)	Length
1.	"Cheap As Sin"	Lloyd, Dave Lowe	4:40
2.	"Nothing Matters"	Lloyd, Mark Tibenham, Lowe	3:55
3.	"Something Nice"		4:05
4.	"Top Floor to Let"		2:53
5.	"Not Forever"		3:48
6.	"Sweet Georgia Black"		4:55
7.	"Funeral Stomp"	Lloyd, Tibenham	3:51
8.	"Of Course You Can't"	Lloyd, Peter Byrchmore	3:11
9.	"Man Oh Man"	Lloyd, Tibenham	3:22
10.	"Hey Roberta"	Lloyd, Tibenham	2:15
11.	"Better to Have"	Don Covay, Erskin Watts	3:29
12.	"The Part of the Anchor"		4:07

== Personnel ==
- Robert Lloyd – vocals (1–12)
- Peter Byrchmore – electric guitar (1, 4), backing vocals (4), violin (7)
- Andy Scott – electric guitar (1, 4, 5, 9, 11), backing vocals (8–10), additional vocals (11)
- Craig Gannon – electric guitar (5, 6, 8, 9), acoustic guitar (6, 8, 10), dobro (10)
- Neil Taylor – electric guitar (2)
- Chas Cronk – acoustic guitar (2)
- Craig Leon – keyboards (1, 4–6, 9, 11), electric guitar (6)
- Andy Richards – keyboards (2, 7), Fairlight programming (2, 7)
- Mark Tibenham – backing vocals (1, 2, 4, 7, 10), keyboards (3), drums (3, 10), piano (10), bass (10)
- Dave Lowe – bass (1), drums (1), additional vocals (2), electric guitar (3, 12), backing vocals (3, 12)
- Benedict Fenner – bass (1), drums (1), percussion (4, 11), additional keyboards (7)
- Micky Harris – bass guitar (3–6, 8, 9, 12)
- Daniel S. – drums (4)
- Pete Thomas – drums (5, 6, 8)
- Mark Fletcher – drums (12)
- Luís Jardim – percussion (1, 2, 4, 7, 9, 11)
- B. J. Cole – pedal steel guitar (6)
- Steve Nieve – piano (6), organ (8)
- Aly Bain – violin (8, 10)
- Geraint Watkins – accordion (10)
- Magda – backing vocals (2), vocals (5)
- Cara Tivey – additional vocals (2), organ (12), backing vocals (12)
- Beverley Brown – additional vocals (2)
- Nick Small – backing vocals (4)
- Wendy Harper – backing vocals (4)
- Chris Bradford – backing vocals (8, 9, 10), additional vocals (11)
- Judy Cheeks – backing vocals (11)
- Cassell Webb – backing vocals (11)

Production

- Craig Leon – production (1, 4–6, 8–11)
- Cassell Webb – production assistant (1, 4–6, 8–11)
- Benedict Fenner – remixing (1, 4, 6, 7, 10, 11), engineering (1, 2, 6, 7, 10, 11)
- Michael J. Ade – engineering (1, 4–6, 8–11)
- Andy Richards – production (2, 7)
- Mark Tibenham – production (3), engineering (3)
- Dale Griffin – production (12)
- Mike Robinson – engineering (12)
- Mike Shilling – engineering (12)

Other

- Christof Gstalder – photography
- Stylorouge – cover
