= The Rock 'n' Roll Diaries =

Book series by Jamie Scallion

- Author: Jamie Scallion
- Country: United Kingdom
- Language: English
- Genre: Young adult
- Publisher: Amazon (Worldwide)
- Published: November 2013
- Media type: Paperback; Audiobook; E-book
- No. of books: 4

The Rock 'n’ Roll Diaries is a series of novels by Jamie Scallion. It follows the rise to fame of four teenage boys from South London.

== Soundtrack (The RockAteers) ==
Irish band The Script, Jamie Scallion and Jimbo Barry wrote and produced the soundtrack to the book. Bringing The RockAteers to life through music and video The RockAteers EP was released exclusively on Spotify on 1 January 2014 and has received over one million streams so far.

== Reception ==
- Book one of The Rock ‘n’ Roll Diaries “Making It” has received over one hundred and fifty FIVE STAR reviews on Amazon and a host of favourable reviews from book bloggers. The RockAteers EP gained over twenty thousand plays in the first four days of its release.
- Book two of The Rock 'n' Roll Diaries "Having It" and EP2 was released in January 2016 and went straight to number one on Amazon.
- Book three of The Rock 'n' Roll Diaries "Losing It" (2016)
- Book four of The Rock 'n' Roll Diaries "Owning It" (2016)

== Plot ==
Burt has fancied Bex since Year Seven. His quest to score a date with the hottest girl in the school has been a catalogue of failure, and Bex isn't impressed by Burt's wealth and good looks. Suddenly there is a glimmer of hope when she lets it be known she likes boys in rock bands. Burt sets himself the challenge of forming a band – and he needs help. His mates won't make the grade so he enlists the help of ginger, musical uber-geek Egg and they hold auditions after school. Burt's gang try out with risible auditions, but then soccer ace Clipper shows what he can do on drums and estate bad-boy Tea surprises them with his skill on the bass guitar. An unlikely quartet is formed and rehearsal sees Burt's first crack as lead singer, Egg's amazing talent on guitar ...and interest from Bex. Burt thinks he's on to a winner – and Egg can't believe the girl he watches wistfully from across the canteen is actually in the school hall, watching him play.

It's not only Burt who needs the band. Clipper is on a fast track to football academy, but that's his dad's dream, not his. Tea needs to get off his rough estate and Egg needs to escape the monotony of music lessons, an overbearing mum and a friendless existence. The band rehearse cover songs with Bex a regular at the weekly rehearsals. The RockAteers are born. Privately, the boys are loving the new call on their time. But Bex's presence barely outweighs Burt's frustrations with his bandmates, especially when Egg surprises them with a self-penned original song. They are all blown away, especially Bex and when Egg reveals he has more, the band take on a new lease of life. Burt announces their first gig in the garage of his mansion, where he lives with his little sister despite his parents being away much of the time. Egg thinks it's too soon for a show, but Burt's already invited everyone and the local press. The RockAteers have the crowd eating out of their hands and everything is brilliant until the after-party sees Egg's ritual humiliation at the hands of Burt's bullying best mate George. Forced to smoke weed until he passes out, Egg escapes the house in the early hours and returns home to find his parents waiting for him and the horrifying sight of his eye-browless face in the bathroom mirror.

Clipper also has an unfortunate end to the night and is distraught when George calls him gay. Burt ends up sleeping with a crazy girl from his front row – Hazel, who he nicknames Crazel when he sees her lurking outside his house the morning after. Egg decides to stay with the band despite the lack of eyebrows. The RockAteers need to raise the funds for a demo fast. Tea decides to accelerate the process by stealing a car but Burt disapproves and Tea's gangster Uncle makes him take it back. No-one has any cash until Burt's little sister Millie cracks open her money box and insists Burt takes the lot. After some eventful studio time the band are armed with a demo and their online profile begins to see some heat. Egg and Bex's friendship is flourishing after she takes him shopping and puts a brave face on meeting his scary mum, who is less than friendly. Egg realises he is totally in love with her. Next up its a ‘Battle of the Bands’ and despite an on-stage fight between Tea and Burt the RockAteers emerge triumphant. Once again Egg finds himself the subject of unwanted attention from George and has his pants pulled down in front of everyone back at Burt's house, including Bex. This time he's had enough and leaves the band.

Billy Visconti is under orders to find a hot new rock band and he thinks he's struck gold when he discovers The RockAteers online. His boss, the Cowell-like Sir Wilson Cloom, agrees so Billy sets up a meeting. Burt is afraid the new problem with Egg could jeopardise their chances of being signed so he visits the Big Tone offices alone and claims all creative credit. He asks Bex to pretend to fancy Egg to get him back in the band but she refuses and then relays the conversation to Egg. Egg is unable to cope with this new twist and insults her. Their friendship seems irretrievable. It's left to Tea and Clipper to persuade Egg to come back. Burt's untruths are quickly exposed when Billy takes the band, with Egg back on board, out to dinner. Billy sees that the true creative genius is Egg and relationships are smoothed over in time for the band's record company showcase, which Wilson Cloom himself will attend. Egg and Bex's friendship is also repaired in time for the big event.

Egg isn't sure the band should sign for the first label to show interest and neither is Bex. She arranges for her dad's friend and ‘third most important person in the music industry’ Jerome Clincher to attend the showcase – and he likes what he sees. The band and Big Tone shake on a deal. Egg's instinct not to rush into a deal with Big Tone is validated after he chats to Jerome, who urges caution and puts a different spin on everything. Then Egg sees Burt kissing someone at the back of the venue. It's Bex. His world comes crashing down. Burt feel's he's hit the jackpot despite the fact that Bex was drunk when he made his move. He goes back to Big Tone Records, once again alone because Egg's not taking calls, only to hear that Wilson and Billy wish to remove Clipper as drummer and send them to a ‘song doctor’ once signing of the deal is complete. Even Burt's not liking what he's hearing.

Once again flirting with Cloom's sexy assistant, Sophia, he leaves with the instruction to replace Clipper sooner rather than later. Burt calls a meeting with Tea and Egg on High Bench to talk about replacing Clipper. The suggestion is met with dismay and accusations and despite his protestations Burt realises that Big Tone might not be the best way forward for the band.

With Egg once again persuaded back the four of them visit Jerome's office. His advice to just be a band and enjoy it all is refreshing to all. They decide not to sign for Big Tone. Wilson Cloom is apoplectic when he receives the email declining his offer of a recording deal and his thoughts immediately turn to revenge. He orders his assistant Sophia to sleep with Burt and discover the band's immediate plans. She's quick to deliver the news that the band are going to sigh for Jerome's Fictitious Records and have secured a support slot for a UK arena tour in the summer. Wilson calls an old friend and ensures the support slot is withdrawn.

Egg secures an awesome set of GCSE results and his romance with Bex is steps up another gear when he writes her a song and arranges to meet on High Bench to play it to her. The result is a kiss and more. Egg is on cloud nine. Burt gets a nasty surprise at the end of the summer when his mother unexpectedly returns from abroad with the news she has enrolled Millie in a Scottish Boarding school with immediate effect. Millie is dragged away and Burt is left devastated. It's easy for Jerome to work out where the leak about future RockAteers plan came from Burt's big mouth via Sophia and straight to Wilson Cloom. He enlists the band in a plan to resurrect their tour support slot involving Burt and the now fired Billy Visconti. Tricking Cloom into admitting his hand in the support slot being cancelled is easy and with the exchange on tape Jerome calls Cloom and warns him of any further meddling in the band's affairs. He sets the date for a triumphant showcase on the River Thames for The RockAteers.

Everything is back on track for The RockAteers and Burt's focus is back onto Bex. It's the night of the showcase and Burt is expecting his little sister back but when he is devastated when he sees that Bex is very definitely with Egg. The band storm through a fabulous showcase gig but at the end when Millie has not shown up as promised Burt has had enough of everything. Then Crazel is waiting on the pier with the news she is expecting Burt's baby. Its all too much. Once at home Burt drinks a bottle of vodka and a handful of mother's pills. But then Clipper texts asking him where he is – the band have gone down a storm and Millie has arrived. Burt crashes the car in his attempts to reach hospital and survives the crash and overdose.
