= Changing Hearts =

Studio album by Polyrock
- Released: 1981
- Studio: RCA
- Genre: New wave, post-punk
- Length: 36:32
- Label: RCA
- Producer: Philip Glass, Kurt Munkacsi

Polyrock chronology
Polyrock (1980)	Changing Hearts (1981)	Above the Fruited Plain (1982)

Changing Hearts is the second studio album by the American band Polyrock, released in 1981. It was produced by Philip Glass, who was attracted to the band's use of musical repetition.

== Critical reception ==
Professional ratings
Review scores
Source	Rating
AllMusic	3.5/5 stars

Trouser Press wrote that "Billy and Tommy Robertson write some of the most vulnerable songs this side of David Byrne, with solid (if lean) performances and production."

== Track listing ==
All songs written by Bill and Tom Robertson, unless noted.

1. "Changing Hearts" - 2:55
2. "Love Song" - 4:46
3. "Quiet Spot" - 1:26
4. "Cries and Whispers - 3:31
5. "Mean Cow" - 2:29
6. "In Full Circle" - 3:43
7. "Like Papers on a Rack" - 3:29
8. "The New U.S." - 3:54
9. "Slow Dogs" - 3:46
10. "Hallways" - 2:24
11. "Rain" - 4:00 (John Lennon, Paul McCartney)

== Credits ==
Produced by Philip Glass & Kurt Munkacsi.
