= She's Got Standards =

Single by the Rifles

from the album No Love Lost
- Released: 3 July 2006
- Genre: Indie rock
- Label: Red Ink
- Songwriters: Joel Stoker, Lucas Crowther, Robert Pyne, Grant Marsh

The Rifles singles chronology
"Repeated Offender" (2006)	"She's Got Standards" (2006)	"Peace & Quiet" (2006)

"She's Got Standards" is the fourth single from the British indie rock band the Rifles, from their debut record No Love Lost. The single was released in July 2006 and reached number 32 on the UK singles chart. The CD version of the single features a cover of the Cure's 1985 single, "In Between Days", which the band showcased on Zane Lowe's Radio 1 show.

== Track listings ==
7-inch Pink Vinyl LTD 82876856577
No.	Title	Length
1.	"She's Got Standards"
2.	"She's Got Standards" (Acoustic)

7-inch Black Vinyl 82876856587
No.	Title	Length
1.	"She's Got Standards"
2.	"Hard To Say" (Demo)

CDS 82876856172
No.	Title	Length
1.	"She's Got Standards"
2.	"In Between Days" (Live from BBC1's Zane Lowe Show)
