= Mind over Matter (The Nightingales album) =

2015 album

Mind Over Matter

Studio album by The Nightingales
- Released: 2015
- Recorded: September 2014
- Genre: Alternative, rock
- Label: Louder Than War
- Producer: Andreas Schmid

The Nightingales chronology
For Fuck's Sake (2014)	Mind Over Matter (2015)	Perish the Thought (2018)

Mind over Matter is the ninth studio album by British band The Nightingales. It was recorded in September 2014 at the Faust Studio, Scheer, Germany.

== Track listing ==
1. "For Goodness Sake"
2. "The Only Son"
3. "'The Man That Time Forgot"
4. "Ripe Old Age"
5. "Taffy Come Home"
6. "For Different Folks"
7. "Stroke Of Genius"
8. "I Itch"
9. "But..."
10. "Gales Doc"
11. "Great British Exports"
12. "Bit Of Rough"

== Personnel ==
- Robert Lloyd – Vocals
- Alan Apperley – Guitars
- Fliss Kitson – Drums, vocals
- Andreas Schmid - Bass

== Reception ==
Joe Shooman of Record Collector awarded the album 4/5 and wrote "Mind Over Matter's sleazy rockabilly nightmares and Captain Beefheart-channeling psychedelic detours are entirely keeping with the group's '80s records". Uncut also rated the album 4/5 and said "This Terrific follow-up is even better, the quartet unloading a clamorous set of songs full of pique, provocation and waspish humour".
