= Hysterics (Nightingales album) =

1983 album

Studio album by The Nightingales
- Released: 1983
- Recorded: August–September 1983
- Studio: Sinewave Studios, Birmingham
- Genre: Post-punk
- Label: Red Flame
- Producer: Chris Williams, The Gales (The Nightingales)

The Nightingales chronology
Pigs on Purpose (1982)	Hysterics (1983)	In The Good Old Country Way (1986)

Hysterics is the second studio album released by British post-punk band The Nightingales. It was released in 1983 through the Red Flame record label and was distributed by Pinnacle. In 2004, it was re-released by the Cherry Red record label. The album spent several weeks in the top 20 in the UK Indie Chart.

James Robert described the album as "sharper" than their debut.

== Track listing ==
1. "Big Print" - 3:54
2. "This" - 3:58
3. "The Happy Medium" - 1:46
4. "Nothing But Trouble" - 3:42
5. "The Bending End" - 4:35
6. "Lower Than Ever" - 2:41
7. "Insurance" - 6:18
8. "Whys of Acknowledgement" - 2:45
9. "Bachelor Land" - 2:51
10. "Crafty Fag" - 3:38
11. "Ponces All" - 3:49

In 2004 the album was re-released by Cherry Red Records. It included the following tracks:

12. "How To Age" - 6:24 (B-side to "Crafty Fag")
13. "Only My Opinion" - 1:04 (alternative lyrics to "Well Done Underdog", a song on Pigs on Purpose)
14. "The Crunch" (Version 2) - 4:49 (alternative lyrics to "The Crunch", a song on Pigs on Purpose)
15. "All Talk" - 1:51 (B-side to "The Crunch")
16. "Look Satisfied" - 3:20 (B-side to "The Crunch")
17. "Not Man Enough" - 4:13 (B-side to "The Crunch")
18. "This" (Version 2) - 3:56 (alternative mix to "This)"
