= No Love Lost (The Rifles album) =

Studio album by The Rifles
- Released: 17 July 2006
- Recorded: 2005–2006
- Genre: Garage rock revival
- Length: 35:58
- Label: Red Ink
- Producer: Ian Broudie

The Rifles chronology
No Love Lost (2006)	Great Escape (2009)

Enhanced Version
- The Enhanced Version containing three more tracks was released on 9 February 2007.

Singles from No Love Lost
- 1. "Peace & Quiet" Released: 14 March 2005; 2. "When I'm Alone" Released: 30 May 2005; 3. "Local Boy" Released: August 2005; 4. "Repeated Offender" Released: 6 March 2006; 5. "She's Got Standards" Released: 3 July 2006; 6. "Peace & Quiet (re-issue)" Released: 16 October 2006

No Love Lost is the debut album by English indie rock band The Rifles, which was released on 17 July 2006. The album reached number 26 on the UK charts.

The album spawned five singles: "Peace & Quiet", "When I'm Alone", "Local Boy", "Repeated Offender", and "She's Got Standards".

On 1 June 2015, No Love Lost was digitally remastered at Abbey Road Studios and re-released as part of the 10th anniversary of the album. The re-release featured b-sides and demos from the recording of the original album.

== Track listing ==
All tracks are written by The Rifles.

No.	Title	Length
1.	"She's Got Standards"	3:04
2.	"Local Boy"	2:52
3.	"One Night Stand"	2:49
4.	"Hometown Blues"	2:51
5.	"Peace & Quiet"	2:45
6.	"Spend A Lifetime"	2:34
7.	"Robin Hood"	2:08
8.	"She's the Only One"	3:15
9.	"Repeated Offender"	2:41
10.	"When I'm Alone"	3:18
11.	"Narrow Minded Social Club"	7:38
Total length:		35:58

- The last track contains a hidden track called "Fat Cat".

=== Bonus tracks on the enhanced version ===
No.	Title	Length
12.	"Up Close"	3:11
13.	"Down South"	2:43
14.	"Holiday in the Sun"	3:07

== Personnel ==
- Engineer - Jon Gray
- Mixing - Ian Broudie, Steve Harris

== See also ==
- The Rifles
