= Polyrock (album) =

Studio album by Polyrock
- Released: 1980
- Studio: RPM, New York
- Genre: Art rock
- Length: 34:32
- Label: RCA
- Producer: Philip Glass, Kurt Munkacsi

Polyrock chronology
Polyrock (1980)	Changing Hearts (1981)

Singles from Polyrock
- 1. "Romantic Me" Released: 1980

Polyrock is Polyrock's debut album. It was released in 1980 on LP on RCA Records. A CD version was not available until 2007, when it was reissued on Wounded Bird Records.

== Critical reception ==
Professional ratings
Review scores
Source	Rating
AllMusic	3.5/5 stars
Chicago Sun Times	4/5 stars
Robert Christgau	B
Trouser Press	favorable

Chuck Pratt of the Chicago Sun Times wrote, "This is art music that's also dance music, strange yet familiar rock 'n' roll. The band could be compared to Brian Eno, Robert Fripp or the Talking Heads, but it imitates none of those artists. Polyrock makes an original sound, a provocative and impressive one."

Robert Christgau noted the "crescendo techniques developed by, that's right, the Feelies—who could have used some coproduction themselves."

The album was ranked at number 76 on Fact's list of "The 100 Best Albums of the 1980s", in 2013.

== Track listing ==
All tracks written by Bill and Tom Robertson.

1. "Romantic Me" – 3:09
2. "Green for Go" – 3:40
3. "This Song" – 2:15
4. "Go West" – 3:22
5. "Your Dragging Feet" – 5:00
6. "No Love Lost" – 2:55
7. "Body Me" – 2:41
8. "Sound Alarm" – 3:01
9. "Bucket Rider" – 2:55
10. "Shut Your Face" – 2:13
11. "#7" – 2:56

== Personnel ==
- Billy Robertson – guitar, vocals
- Tommy Robertson – guitar, electronics, violin
- Curt Cosentino – bass machine, synthesizer
- Lenny Aaron – keyboards
- Joseph Yannece – drums, percussions
- Philip Glass – piano, keyboards
- Catherine Oblasney – percussions, vocals

== Singles ==
- Romantic Me / Your Dragging Feet (1980) #69 [Club Play Singles]
