= Polyrock =

American post-punk/new wave band

"Polyrock" (1980)

Polyrock was an American post-punk/new wave band formed in New York City in 1978 and active until the mid-1980s. Strongly influenced by minimalism, the group was produced by the composer Philip Glass and Kurt Munkacsi. The band, led by singer/guitarist Billy Robertson (formerly of the group Model Citizens), had a keyboard-heavy, pattern-based sound strongly reminiscent of Glass's work; in fact, Glass performed on their first two albums.

Polyrock's lineup also included vocalist Catherine Oblasney, guitarist Tommy Robertson, drummer Joseph Yannece, keyboard player Lenny Aaron, and Curt Cosentino. The group signed with RCA by 1980, and delivered their debut album that same year. Another album followed in 1981 (Changing Hearts), but Polyrock disbanded in 1983. The band are sometimes said to have released another album in 1981 (Electro-Romantic), but, apparently, no such album exists.

They were often compared by critics to Talking Heads, another band of the same era, though they never approached that band's fame.

In 1990, Billy Robertson and Catherine Oblasney formed the group 9 Ways to Sunday and released a self-titled album.

Robertson died in September 2018. A memorial was held September 24, 2018, at the Brooklyn Ice House bar in the Red Hook neighborhood of Brooklyn, near where Robertson lived.

== Discography ==
=== Studio albums ===
- Polyrock (1980)
- Changing Hearts (1981)

=== Extended play ===
- Above the Fruited Plain (1982)

=== Compilation albums ===
- RCA Special Radio Series Vol. III (1980) (LP of Radio recordings)
- No Love Lost (1986) (Cassette compilation of various unreleased tracks)
- Blitz (1981) (LP compilation of various artist)

=== Singles ===
- "Romantic Me" / "Your Dragging Feet" (1980) (No. 69 [Club Play Singles])
- "Working on My Love" / "Call of the Wild" (1982)
