= Let's Think About Living =

Single by Bob Luman

from the album Let's Think About Living
- B-side: "You've Got Everything"
- Released: August 15, 1960
- Recorded: July 11, 1960
- Studio: RCA Victor Studios, Nashville, Tennessee, United States
- Genre: Rockabilly
- Length: 2:02
- Label: Warner Bros.
- Songwriter(s): Boudleaux Bryant

Bob Luman singles chronology
"Dreamy Doll" (1959)	"Let's Think About Living" (1960)	"Why Why Bye Bye" (1960)

"Let's Think About Living" is a song written by Boudleaux Bryant, and recorded by American country music artist Bob Luman. It was released in August 1960 as the second single and title track from his album Let's Think About Living. The song reached No. 9 on the Billboard Hot Country Singles & Tracks chart.

== Background ==
The song is an open critique of the teenage tragedy song and gunfighter ballad genre of the time, humorously quipping that if Marty Robbins, Patti Page and the Everly Brothers actually died in the songs where they mention dying ("El Paso", "One of Us (Will Weep Tonight)", and "Cathy's Clown" ), the singer humorously suggests he will soon be the last surviving musician in the industry. The lyrics suggest happier themes for songs in the future such as living, loving and dancing.

== Charts ==
Chart (1960)	Peak position
Australia Kent Music Report	3
Norway (VG-lista)	3
U.K. Singles Chart	6
US Billboard Hot 100	7
US Hot Country Songs (Billboard)	9

== Covers ==
The Swedish group Sven-Ingvars Kvartett (later Sven-Ingvars) 1961 - the first song on their first EP record (Philips 421 587 PE).
