= The Rifles (band) =

English indie rock band

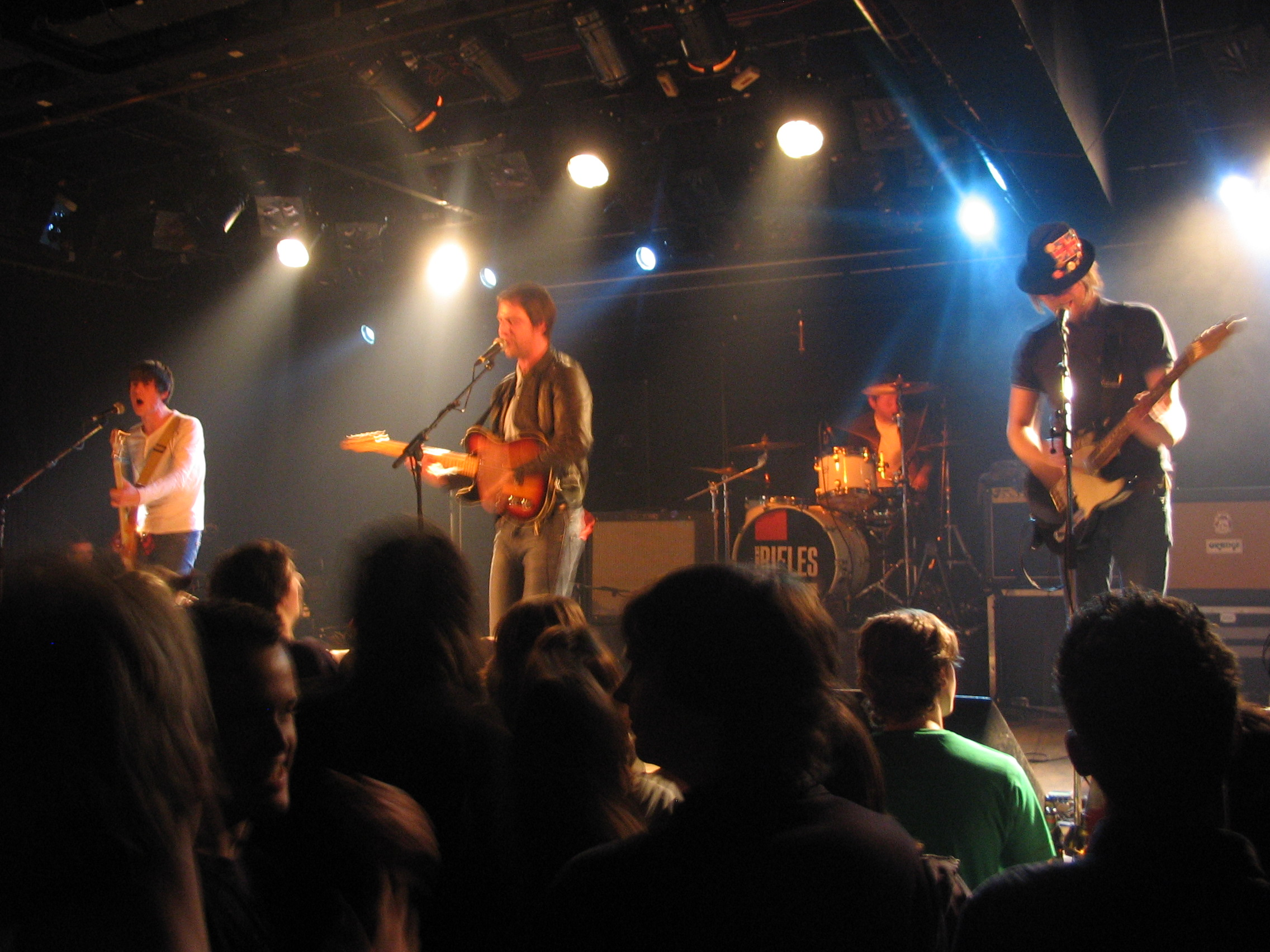
- The Rifles in concert in Doornroosje, Nijmegen, Netherlands

Background information
- Origin: Chingford, England
- Genres: Indie rock
- Years active: 2004–present
- Labels: Cooking Vinyl; Sixsevenine; Universal Publishing
- Members: Joel Stoker; Lucas Crowther; Robert Pyne; Grant Marsh; Dean Mumford
- Past members: Lee Burgess; Kenton Shinn
- Website: therifles.com

The Rifles are an English indie rock band from Chingford, London.

Their debut album No Love Lost was released on 17 July 2006 and initially reached No. 68 in the UK Albums Chart. The band currently consists of Joel Stoker (vocals, guitar), Lucas Crowther (guitar, vocals), Rob Pyne (bass guitar), Grant Marsh (drums) and Dean Mumford (keyboard). Their follow-up album, Great Escape, was released on 26 January 2009 and came in at No. 27 in the UK chart. Their third album Freedom Run was released on 19 September 2011 reaching No. 37 in the UK. Fourth album None The Wiser was their highest charting release when it reached No. 21 in 2014. The band released their fifth studio album Big Life on 19 August 2016.

== History ==
=== Formation and No Love Lost (2003–2006) ===
Joel Stoker and Lucas Crowther met at Redbridge College in 2003. They were both inspired by an Oasis concert the two attended in Knebworth, England. Guitarist Crowther revealed "From that moment on we knew we had to start a band." After adding bassist Robert Pyne, who Joel knew from school, and drummer Grant Marsh, who Luke met in the Candy Box club, the Rifles performed their first gig at The Bull & Gate pub in Kentish Town, London in 2004.

The Rifles' first official release was a 7" demo of "Peace & Quiet" released by Blow Up Records. The band switched to fellow independent label Xtra Mile Recordings for their May 2005 release of the single "When I'm Alone", which would go on to reach number 64 in the UK charts. Later that year the band's next single "Local Boy" would be released via Right Hook Recordings. It would get airplay on the Saturday morning show Soccer AM and would help give the band more exposure and even help them become regular guests on the show. The Rifles released two singles, "Repeated Offender" and "She's Got Standards", ahead of the 17 July release of their debut album No Love Lost, which peaked at 26 in the UK charts. The band toured in 2006, and performed at A Campingflight to Lowlands Paradise 2007 and Paaspop Schijndel 2007, two music festivals in the Netherlands. The Rifles launched their European tour to promote their new album including a gig at the Forum, London, at which Paul Weller (The Jam) appeared on stage to play the song "She's the Only One" with the band, and The Jam's single, "The Eton Rifles". The Rifles then released a free download of the song "No Love Lost" a year after their album of the same name was released.

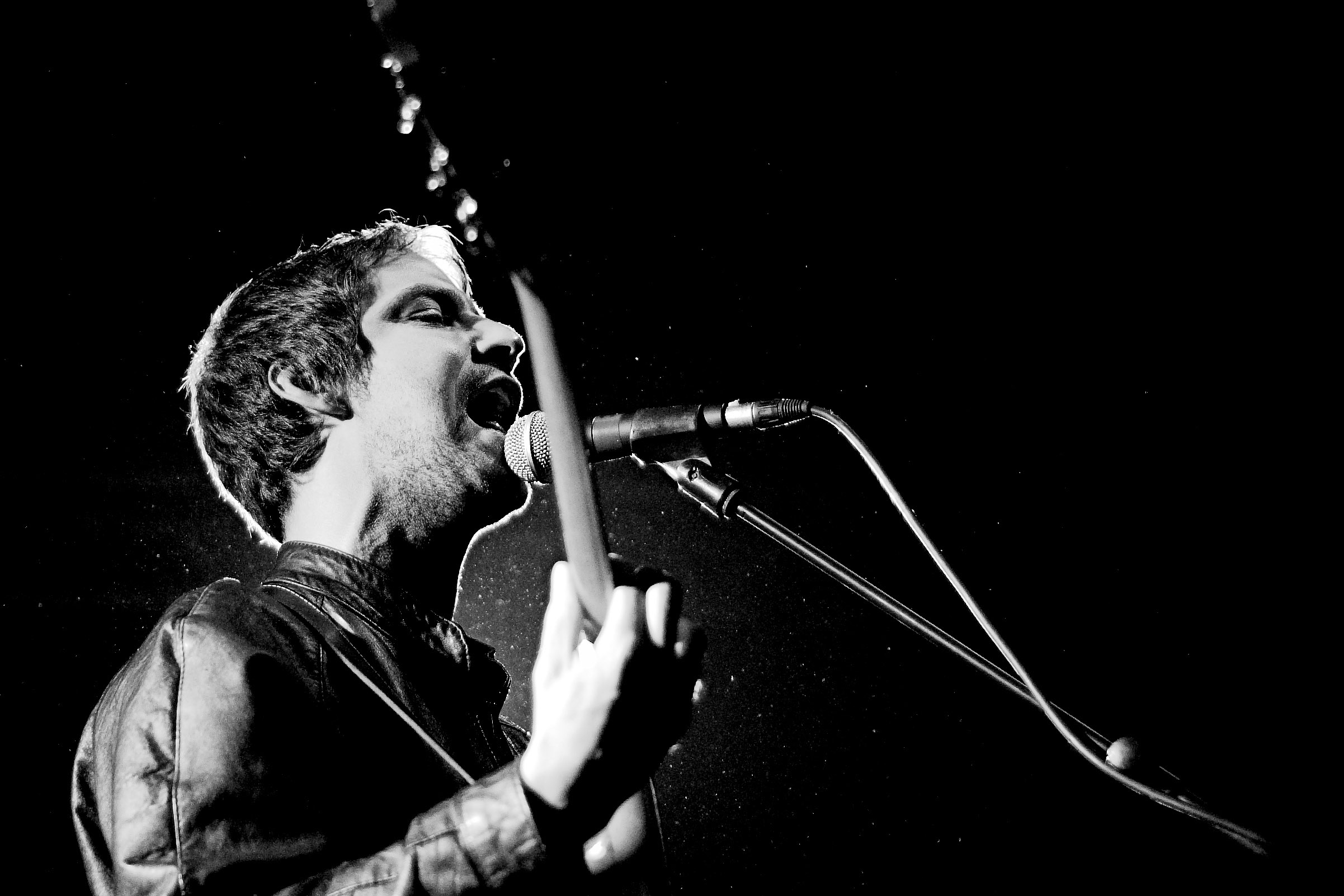
The Rifles at the University of Warwick SU 2007

=== Great Escape (2007–2010) ===
Touring on the back of their album No Love Lost, The Rifles again released a free download, this time of their single "Talking" on 20 October 2007. The single garnered high accolades from BBC Radio 1's Zane Lowe, who called it the "Hottest Record in the World". "Talking" also marked the band's label switch from Red Ink to 679 Recordings. On 21 July 2008, the single "I Could Never Lie" was released on a limited-edition vinyl disc. The Rifles also made appearances at the Underage Festival and the V Festival in the summer and played an extensive tour throughout October and November in 2008 when long-time friend of the band Dean Mumford (from the band Regency) was added on keyboards as session player for live performances.

When the band's second album was delayed from October 2008 to January 2009, the Rifles created The Rifles EP that fans could download on the internet. The Rifles released their second album Great Escape on 26 January 2009, which peaked at 27 in the UK charts and reached the number 2 slot in the UK indie charts. In April 2009 they performed live at the PFA Awards performing a re-written version of Billy Joel's "We Didn't Start the Fire" which was broadcast by Sky Sports. After a tour throughout the United Kingdom and Germany, the band announced extensive acoustic tours for the autumn and winter of 2010 and plans for a third album.

=== Freedom Run (2010–2013) ===
On 17 October 2010, Grant Marsh and Rob Pyne announced they had left the band. While touring in 2010, the Rifles released Acoustic No. 1, an acoustic album containing new and old songs. Long time friends Lee Burgess and Kenton Shinn from the band Garda were added to the Rifles. On 15 February 2011, the Rifles began recording songs for a third studio album. The new album, called Freedom Run, was released on 19 September 2011. The Rifles began work on a deluxe version of Freedom Run on 9 February 2012. In addition to a deluxe Freedom Run, the Rifles had an autumn/winter acoustic tour in 2012 and started work on songs for a new album. The Rifles launched their PledgeMusic campaign on 28 September 2012 to help fund their fourth studio album. The band also recorded Acoustic No. 2, their second acoustic album which was available on their winter 2012 acoustic tour.

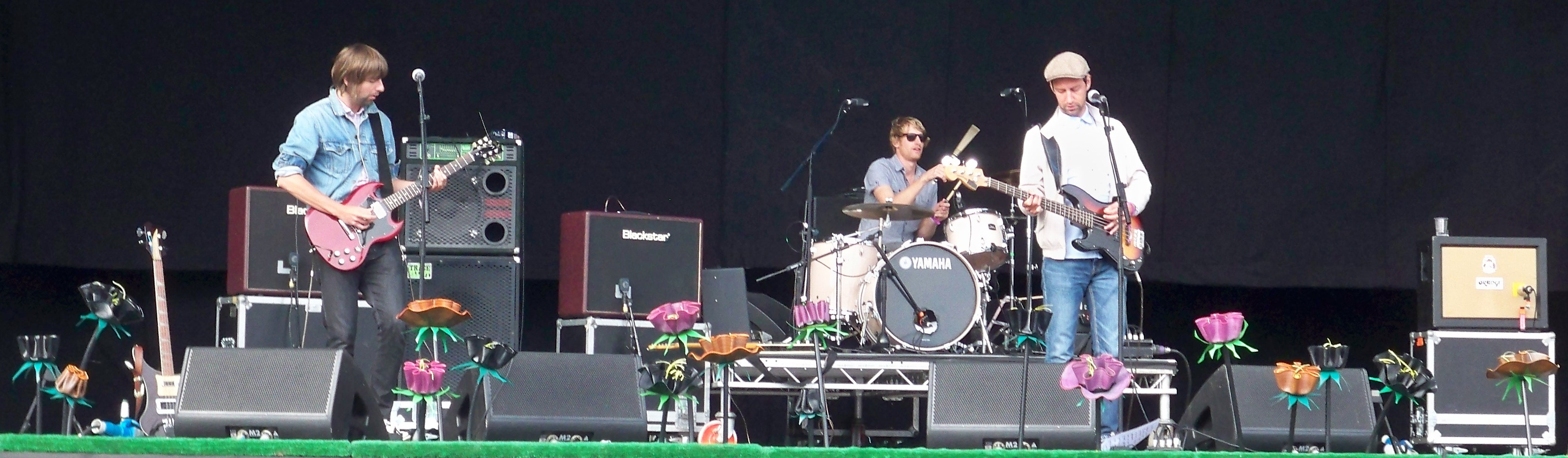
The Rifles onstage at Guilfest 2011

In May 2013, the band announced that the four original members, including Marsh and Pyne, had reunited and were working on a fourth album.

=== None the Wiser (2014–2015) ===
The band's fourth studio album None the Wiser was released on 27 January 2014. It reached no. 21 in the album chart, the highest position for a Rifles album.

While touring on the re-release of No Love Lost for the album's ten-year anniversary in 2015, Joel Stoker stated the band were already writing songs for a 5th studio album. Several new songs were played live by the band on their early 2016 tour of the UK.

=== Big Life (2016) ===
The fifth studio album, Big Life, the band's first double album, was released in August 2016.

=== Singles Collection and Unplugged Album (2017) ===
In 2017, the band released two albums. The Singles Collection, a collection of singles taken from their five albums and handful of EPs and Unplugged Album, recorded live at the Abbey Road Studios alongside a string quarter and a large choir. The album features versions of their songs taken from None The Wiser, Great Escape, Freedom Run, No Love Lost and Big Life.

=== Live At The Roundhouse (2020) ===
In 2020, the band released a double-LP live album featuring songs spanning their career.

== Discography ==
=== Studio albums ===
Year	Album	Chart positions		
Year	Album	UK	Physical (UK)	Independent (UK)
2006	No Love Lost: Released: 17 July 2006; Label: Red Ink; Formats: CD, LP	48	33	7
2009	Great Escape: Released: 26 January 2009; Label: Sixsevenine; Formats: CD, LP	27	30	16
2011	Freedom Run: Released: 19 September 2011; Label: Formats: CD, LP	37	39	35
2014	None the Wiser: Release: 20 January 2014; Label: Cooking Vinyl; Formats: CD, LP	21	22	6
2016	Big Life: Release: 19 August 2016; Label: Cooking Vinyl; Formats: Digital, CD, LP	26	14	6
2024	Love Your Neighbour: Release: 5 July 2024; Label: Cooking Vinyl; Formats: Digital, CD, vinyl LP	73	2	1

=== Non studio albums ===
- The Singles Collection (2017)
- Unplugged Album: Recorded at Abbey Road Studios (2017)
- Live at the Roundhouse (2020) *Unplugged Album Vol. 2: Recorded at Studio 2 (2026)

=== EPs ===
- Live at Shepherds Bush Empire (4 October 2007)
- The Rifles EP (15 December 2008)
- Acoustic 1 (2010)
- Acoustic 2 (2012)

=== Singles ===
Year	Song	UK Singles Chart	Album
2005	"Peace & Quiet" (demo)	-	No Love Lost
2005	"When I'm Alone"	64	No Love Lost
2005	"Local Boy"	36	No Love Lost
2006	"Repeated Offender"	26	No Love Lost
2006	"She's Got Standards"	32	No Love Lost
2006	"Peace & Quiet" (re-issue)	48	No Love Lost
2007	"No Love Lost"	-	Free Download
2007	"Talking"	-	Free Download
2008	"I Could Never Lie"	-	Limited Vinyl
2009	"Fall to Sorrow"	-	Great Escape
2009	"The General"/"Romeo & Julie"	-	Great Escape
2009	"The Great Escape"	-	Great Escape
2011	"Tangled Up in Love"	-	Freedom Run
2011	"Sweetest Thing"	-	Freedom Run
2014	"Heebie Jeebies"	-	None the Wiser
2014	"Minute Mile"	-	None the Wiser
2014	"All I Need"	-	None the Wiser
2016	"Numero Uno"	-	Big Life
2016	"Wall Around Your "Heart"	-	Big Life
2016	"Turtle Dove"	-	Big Life
2017	"In Key"	-	The Rifles Unplugged Album
