= Great Escape (The Rifles album) =

Studio album by the Rifles
- Released: 26 January 2009
- Recorded: 2007–2008
- Genre: Indie rock
- Labels: 679, Nettwerk
- Producers: Stan Kybert; Dave McCracken

The Rifles chronology
No Love Lost (2006)	Great Escape (2009)	Freedom Run (2011)

Singles from Great Escape
- 1. "Fall to Sorrow" Released: 19 January 2009; 2. "The General / Romeo & Julie" Released: 13 April 2009; 3. "The Great Escape" Released: 22 June 2009

Professional ratings
Aggregate scores
Source	Rating
Metacritic	61/100
Review scores
Source	Rating
ReadJunk.com	5/5 stars
Virgin	8/10 stars

Great Escape is the second studio album from the Rifles, released on 26 January 2009 after it was delayed from its initial release date of 13 October 2008. The album delay was somewhat attributed to the length of time it took to record. The Rifles used two different producers, Dave McCracken and Stan "Jan" Kybert, as well as recording the album in three different locations.

The Rifles used Dave Davies' (The Kinks) Konk Studios in Crouch End, Dan Hawkins' (The Darkness) studio Leeders Farm, and "The Pool" in Miloco Studios to record the album.

The working title for the album was The Pavement's Diaries.

The album was released in North America on 15 September 2009 through Nettwerk Music Group.

== Track listing ==
All tracks are written by The Rifles.

No.	Title	Length
1.	"Science in Violence"	3:34
2.	"The Great Escape"	3:26
3.	"Fall to Sorrow"	2:44
4.	"Sometimes"	3:49
5.	"Toe Rag"	3:53
6.	"History"	3:21
7.	"Winter Calls"	3:44
8.	"Out in the Past"	4:28
9.	"Romeo & Julie"	3:08
10.	"The General"	4:46
11.	"For the Meantime"	6:00

- The last track contains a hidden track called "Lazy Bones".

== Track listing Japan Edition ==
All tracks are written by The Rifles.

No.	Title	Length
1.	"Science in Violence"	3:34
2.	"The Great Escape"	3:26
3.	"I Could Never Lie"	3:22
4.	"Romeo & Julie"	3:08
5.	"Darling Girl"	4:06
6.	"History"	3:21
7.	"Winter Calls"	3:44
8.	"Talking"	3:26
9.	"Toe Rag"	3:53
10.	"Fall To Sorrow"	2:45
11.	"Sometimes"	3:06
12.	"Out In The Past"	4:28
13.	"A Love To Die For"	2:20
14.	"For The Meantime"	2:28
15.	"The General"	8:19

- The last track contains a hidden track called "Lazy Bones".

== In popular culture ==
"The Great Escape" was used on the soundtrack of the 2011 video game Test Drive Unlimited 2.

"Winter Calls" was used on a Dasani water commercial, and in several episodes of the third series of BBC comedy Gavin & Stacey.

== Personnel ==
- Cello - Ian Burdge (tracks: 2,10,11)
- Viola - John Metcalfe (tracks: 2), N. Baw (tracks: 10,11)
- Violin - Louisa Fuller, Sally Herbert (tracks: 2), Emlyn Singleton, Warren Zielinski (tracks: 10,11)
- Trumpet - Daniel Newell (tracks: 10,11)

== Production ==
- Producer - Dave McCraken (tracks: 2,5,6,7), Stan Kybert (tracks: 1,3,4,8–12)
- Engineer - Andy Saunders (tracks: 1,3,4,8–12), Gergus Peterkin (tracks: 7), Richard Wilkinson, Serg (tracks: 2,5,6)
- Additional Engineer - Dario Dendi (tracks: 1,3,4,8–12)
- Mastering - Ted Jensen
- Additional Mastering - Guy Davie
- Mixing - Stephen Harris (tracks: 1,3,4,8–12), Steve Fitzmaurice (tracks: 2,5,6,7)
- Photography - Oliver Twitchett
