= The Nightingales =

British band

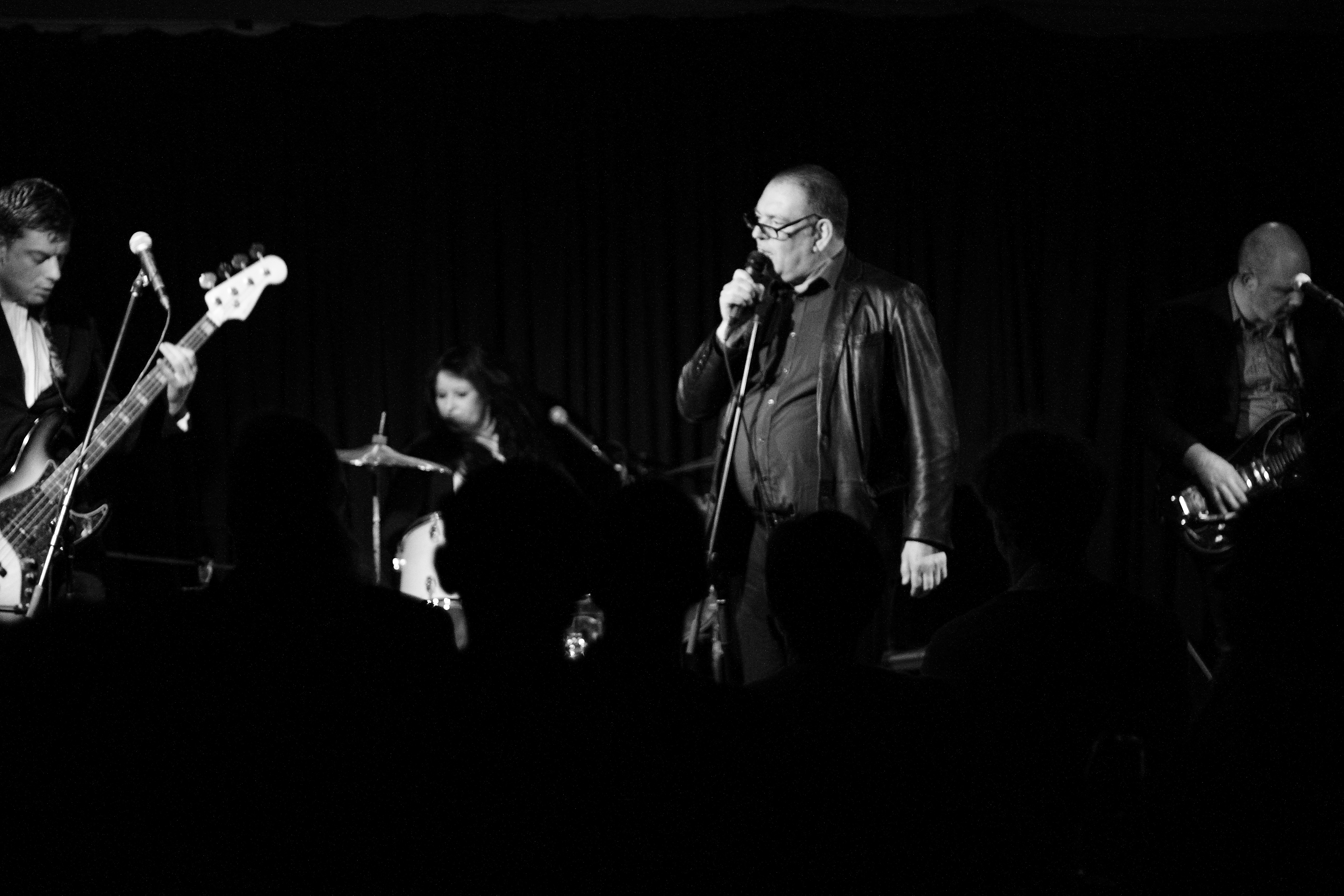
- The Nightingales at Club W71, Weikersheim. 2016

Background information
- Origin: Birmingham, England
- Genres: Post-punk, alternative rock
- Years active: 1979–1986, 2004–present
- Members: Robert Lloyd; Andreas Schmid; Fliss Kitson; James Smith; Natalie Mason
- Past members: Paul Apperley; Eamonn Duffy; Andy Lloyd; Nick Beales; Steve Hawkins; John Nester; Peter Byrchmore; Howard Jenner; Maria Smith; Ron Collins; Robert "Fuzz" Townshend; Aaron Moore; Daren Garratt; Matt Wood; Stephen Lowe; Nick Blakey; John Roberts; Christy Edwards; Katherine Young; Emily Manzo; Alan Apperley

Nightingales (a.k.a. The Nightingales) are a British post-punk/alternative rock band, formed in 1979 in Birmingham, England, by four members of Birmingham's punk group The Prefects. They had been part of The Clash's 'White Riot Tour', recorded a couple of Peel Sessions, released a 45 on Rough Trade and, years after splitting up, had a retrospective CD released by US indie label Acute Records.

Described in John Robb's book on 'post punk' Death To Trad Rock as "The misfits' misfits" and comprising an ever-fluctuating line up, based around lyricist/singer Robert Lloyd, the Nightingales enjoyed cult status in the early 1980s as darlings of the credible music scene and were championed by John Peel, who said of them – "Their performances will serve to confirm their excellence when we are far enough distanced from the 1980s to look at the period rationally and other, infinitely better known, bands stand revealed as charlatans".

The original members were Robert Lloyd on vocals, Eamonn Duffy on bass and Paul Apperley on drums, all formerly of The Prefects. The band, before splitting up, played more sessions on John Peel's BBC Radio 1 show than any other band excluding The Fall and Half Man Half Biscuit.

In the late 1980s, the Nightingales stopped working but, following the occasional gig between times, they re-grouped in 2004, with Lloyd being joined by original Prefects guitarist Alan Apperley. The current line up features Robert Lloyd, James Smith, Andreas Schmid on bass and ex-Violet Violet drummer Fliss Kitson.

Since restarting the group have been more productive than ever – releasing five 7" vinyl singles, a 10" EP and six studio albums (plus two live albums), touring England, mainland Europe and US numerous times, recording many radio sessions along the way. They have been invited to play various festivals in Europe and the States, including Glastonbury and SXSW. Their "Let's Think About Living" 45 was 'Single of the Week' on BBC 6 and they have continued to receive regular rave reviews for their records and live shows.

A feature-length documentary about the band - King Rocker - fronted by comedian and writer Stewart Lee and directed by Michael Cumming was to be released in 2020, but it eventually debuted on the UK Sky Arts channel on 6 February 2021.

== 1979–86 ==
Their debut single, "Idiot Strength" was released in 1981 on Rough Trade, following which Duffy was replaced by Steve Hawkins on bass and Andy Lloyd and Nick Beales joined on guitars.

The band signed to Cherry Red Records and released three more singles before debut album Pigs on Purpose (Produced by Richard Strange) was issued in late 1982. John Nester replaced Hawkins on bass before next release, the "Urban Ospreys" single.

Peter Byrchmore replaced Beales (who went on to form Pig Bros) in time for second album, Hysterics (1983), Nester then departed to be replaced by Howard Jenner. The new line-up issued two singles in 1985. Further changes then ensued with Andy Lloyd and Paul Apperley leaving, to be replaced by Maria Smith and Ron Collins. The group continued to release singles, record Peel Sessions and tour northern Europe, as headliners and supporting acts as diverse as Bo Diddley and Nico, but after the third album, In The Good Old Country Way, the band split up in 1986.

== Post-Nightingales ==
After the split, Robert Lloyd formed a new band, Robert Lloyd & The New Four Seasons, who after a few releases on In Tape Records were signed by Virgin Records. Lloyd recorded one solo album for Virgin, Me and My Mouth.

Maria and Peter formed The Capitols, later known as The Rotten Swines (Maria was also a member of Rumblefish), Ron Collins joined The Noseflutes, while Andy Lloyd formed Little Red Schoolhouse.

Lloyd is currently active in the reformed Nightingales. Peter Byrchmore plays guitar for The Membranes and Goldblade. Nick Beales is in Church of Elvis and Andy Lloyd is in Del Mar Rey.

Paul Apperley is now a firefighter. John Nester ran a successful greengrocery business, followed by a 'Glastonbury-style' gift shop in Bridport, Dorset. Now retired from toil, he devotes himself to his friends in Mor or Less, a local folk-rock band. Howard Jenner was last heard of working for Help The Aged. Eamonn Duffy, Maria Harvey (formerly Smith) and Ron Collins still live and work in Birmingham. Steve Hawkins' whereabouts are unknown.

== The Nightingales re-form ==
The band re-grouped in 2004 featuring mainstay/band leader Lloyd, original Prefects guitarist Alan Apperley, ex-Nightingales Byrchmore and Duffy, plus former PWEI drummer Robert "Fuzz" Townshend. This line-up released four 7-inch singles in 2004/5 before Townshend was replaced by Aaron Moore of Volcano The Bear.

Live appearances include radio sessions for Marc Riley's Rocket Science on BBC 6 Music, John Kennedy's XFM show, Terre T's Cherry Blossom Clinic on WFMU (USA) and Another Nice Mess (NL) in addition to gigs around England.

The band also played American music festival South By Southwest in March 2005, alongside dates in Chicago and New York City. The band's first American dates ever. Since then they have also played at the Klangbad festival in Germany, organised by Jochen Irmler of Faust, and undertaken a second US tour in March 2007.

After several line up changes since reforming, the group line-up settled, for a while, as Robert Lloyd (vocals), Alan Apperley (guitar), ex-Pram drummer Daren Garratt, "teenage guitar sensation" Matt Wood, and Stephen 'The Night' Lowe (bass). For a brief July–August 2007 UK and European tour (including a return to the Klangbad Festival on 4 August), Nick Blakey of the Boston, Massachusetts band The in Out substituted for Lowe on bass.

The Nightingales released their first studio album for 20 years in early October 2006; Out of True on independent Birmingham label Iron Man Records. A new mini album, What's Not To Love? was released by Caroline True Records on 30 April 2007.

In 2007 Lowe left the band and after being replaced briefly by Nick Blakey (who appears on the Live in Paris CD) was replaced by John Roberts.

After dates in New York and Boston in March 2008, the group travelled to Faust Studio, Scheer, Germany to record a new album – Insult to Injury – for Jochen Irmler's Klangbad label. During recording bassist John Roberts left the group. The band played dates in Germany, Switzerland and in Amsterdam, with Christy Edwards of Christy and Emily on bass. Matt Wood left following these dates.

For the remainder of 2008 in to 2009 Edwards moved to guitar and Faust Studio engineer Andreas Schmid joined the band on bass. This line up was augmented on various dates in USA and Germany by U.S avant-garde composer Katherine Young on bassoon and Emily Manzo on keyboards. In June 2009, this Nightingales, minus Young, played the John Peel Stage at the Glastonbury Festival in the UK. The seven piece line up also played several festivals in Germany during Summer '09 and recorded "The Lost Plot" EP and another album but the album recordings remain unreleased.

In late 2010, Garratt left the group to be replaced by former Violet Violet drummer, Fliss Kitson. Being based in New York also relegated Edwards to an occasional guest Nightingale and guitarist Matt Wood rejoined the band.

A return to Faust Studio in 2011 saw the Nightingales record the No Love Lost album, which was released by Cooking Vinyl in early 2012. Described by Mojo magazine as "Brilliant. One of the fiercest and most exhilarating rock records in ages", the record features guests Young on bassoon and Hans-Joachim Irmler on keyboards. Wood left the band for the second time shortly after recording the album and has since joined Telegram. In May 2011, the Nightingales played at The New Adelphi Club in Hull, East Yorkshire.

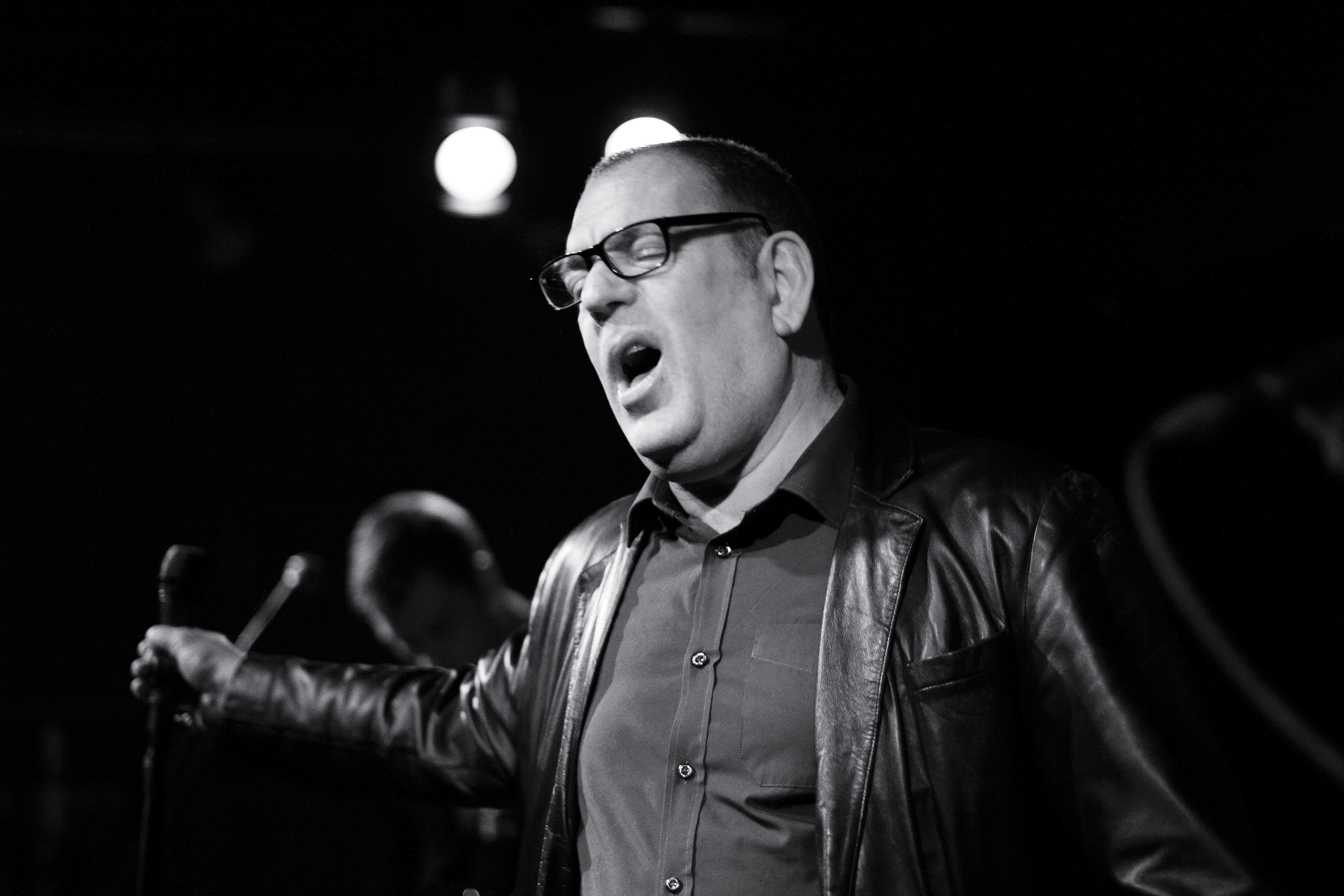
Robert Lloyd

The new four piece Nightingales – Lloyd, Apperley, Schmid and Kitson – recorded another album For Fucks Sake in September 2013 for vinyl LP release in April 2014. The band's press statement for this record said, "Having been dumped by their fourth consecutive label, following the release of one album each, the group are self releasing the new LP on their own terms. No interference or outside opinions, no label, no distributor, no catalogue number, no bar code or logo shit, blah blah. "For Fucks Sake" is an 180g vinyl LP, containing twelve songs and came packaged in a beautiful matt varnish gatefold sleeve (& inner bag) featuring five original art works by brilliant Scarborough based artist David Yates."

The group had a full tour of UK and, for the first time, Ireland in spring 2014, with live shows in Europe and USA over the following year. They recorded a new album Mind Over Matter in early autumn 2014, for 2015 release.

After their late autumn 2014 tour, James Smith replaced Apperley in the band.

== Discography ==
Chart placings shown are from the UK Indie Chart.

=== Albums ===
- Pigs on Purpose (Cherry Red LP) 1982, CD reissue 2004 (#15), LP reissue (Vinilissimo) 2014, CD & LP reissue (Call of the Void) 2021
- Hysterics (Ink/Red Flame LP) 1983 (#20), CD reissue (Cherry Red) 2005, LP reissue (Call of the Void) 2022
- In The Good Old Country Way (Vindaloo LP) 1986 (#8), CD reissue (Caroline True) 2005, LP reissue (Call of the Void) 2022
- Out of True (Iron Man CD) 2006, LP reissue (Fire Records) 2023
- What's Not To Love? (Caroline True CD) 2007
- Insult to Injury (Klangbad CD) 2008
- No Love Lost (Cooking Vinyl CD) 2012
- For Fuck's Sake (no label LP) 2014
- Mind Over Matter (Louder Than War CD & LP) 2015
- Perish the Thought (Tiny Global Productions CD & LP) 2018
- Four Against Fate (Tiny Global Productions CD & LP) 2020
- The Last Laugh (Tiny Global Productions CD & LP) 2022
- The Awful Truth (Fire Records CD & LP) 2025

=== Live ===
- Live in Paris (Big Print CD) 2008
- And Another Thing (Big Print CD) 2010
- Live in Balsall Heath (Tiny Global Productions LP) 2023

=== Compilations ===
- Just The Job compilation (Vindaloo LP) 1984
- What A Scream (1980–1986) compilation (Mau Mau/Demon CD) 1991
- Pissed & Potless – The Definitive Nightingales Collection compilation (Cherry Red CD) 2001
- King Rocker (Fire Records / Tiny Global Productions) 2021

=== EPs ===
- The Nightingales 1982 (Cherry Red) (#34) (note: a BBC John Peel session)
- The Crunch 1984 (Vindaloo) (#27)
- What a Carry On 1985 (Vindaloo) (#26)
- Peel Session 1988 (Strange Fruit)
- The Lost Plot 2010 (Big Print)
- Become Not Becoming 2017 (Tiny Global Productions)
- Give It To Me/ B-Side At Best/ Real Gone Daddy 2018 (Tiny Global Productions)
- The New Nonsense 2022 (Tiny Global Productions)

=== Singles ===
- "Idiot Strength" 1981 (Rough Trade/Vindaloo)
- "Use Your Loaf" 1982 (Cherry Red)
- "Paraffin Brain" 1982 (Cherry Red) (#39)
- "Urban Ospreys" 1983 (Cherry Red) (#26)
- "Crafty Fag" 1983 (Ink/Red Flame) (#27)
- "It's a Cracker" 1985 (Vindaloo) (#16)
- "Rocking With Rita (Head To Toe)" 1986 (with We've Got a Fuzzbox and We're Gonna Use It and Ted Chippington; credited as The Vindaloo Summer Special) (#56 in the UK Singles Chart)
- "Black Country" 2004 (Big Print)
- "Workshy Wunderkind" 2004 (Big Print)
- "EFL (Sex And God Knows What)" 2004 (Big Print)
- "Devil In The Detail" 2005 (Big Print)
- "Mondofiasco" 2005 (Big Print)
- "Let's Think About Living" 2006 (Fake Product)
- "Commercial Suicide Man" 2018 (as The Nightingales with Vic Godard) (Tiny Global Productions)
- "Ten Bob Each Way" b/w "Use Your Loaf" by Stewart Lee 2021 (Fire Records)
- "Hand Me My Backside" 2026 (Fire Records)
