= Robert Lloyd (Nightingales) =

English rock singer

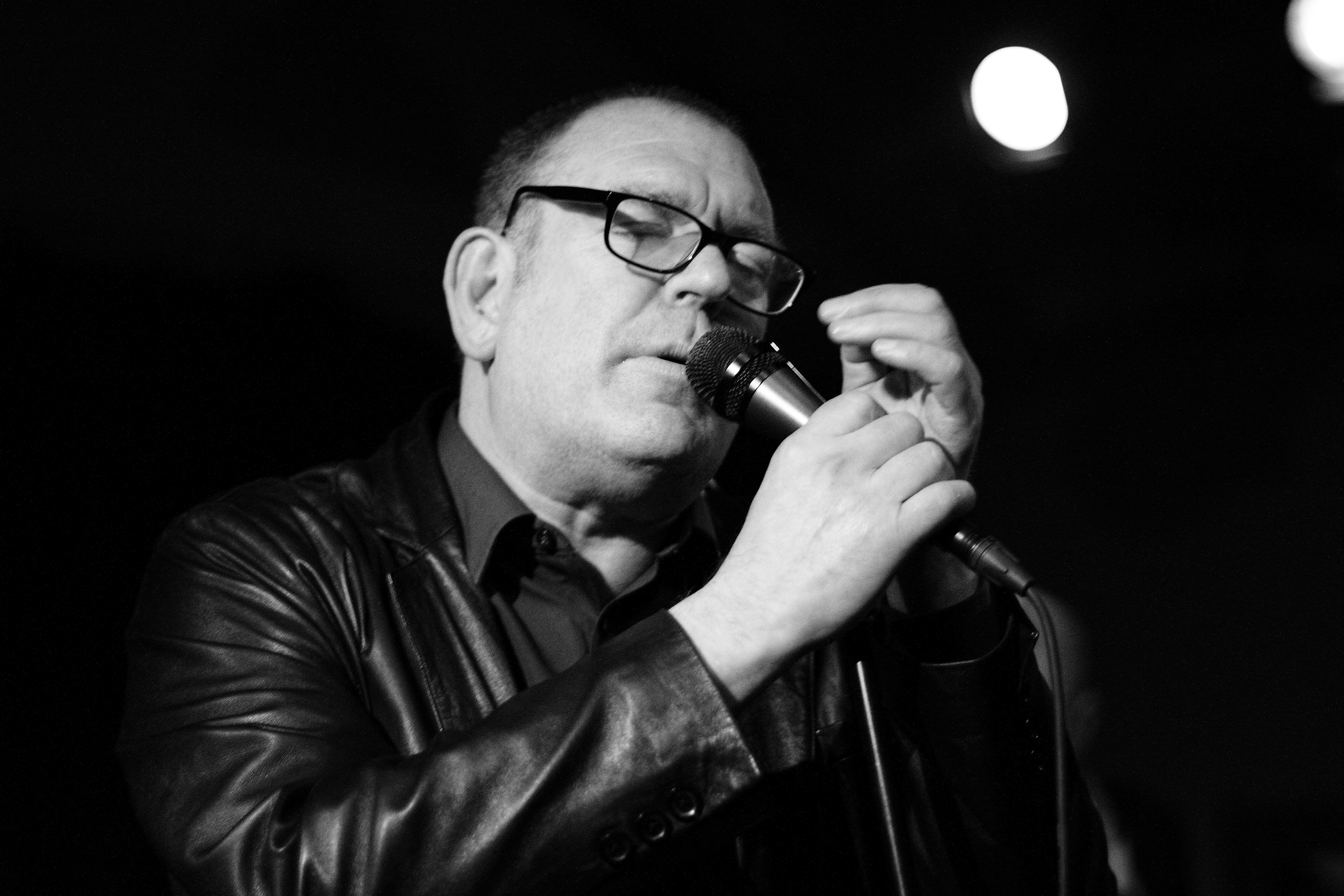
Robert Lloyd at Club W71, Weikersheim, 2016

Robert Lloyd (born 5 June 1959) is the lead singer with The Nightingales and formerly with The Prefects. When The Nightingales split in 1986, Lloyd embarked on a solo career, initially signing to In-Tape before signing to Virgin Records in 1989 and releasing the album Me and My Mouth (1990). The album featured Steve Nieve and Pete Thomas (of The Attractions), Andy Scott (of Sweet) and Craig Gannon (formerly of The Smiths among others), but for the tour to promote the album, Lloyd had to recruit a new band which included former Nightingales guitarist Peter 'The Tank' Byrchmore (who also played on the album). After Virgin dropped Lloyd from their roster in 1991, he formed a new band, Terminal Hoedown, with Byrchmore on lead guitar, Joe Crow on guitar, Eamonn James Duffy on bass and Ernie Hendricks on drums. The Nightingales re-formed in 2004.

Lloyd was born in Cannock, Staffordshire. He has a son named Louis, and continues to reside in the West Midlands. Lloyd also managed pub football team "The Albion in Goldsmith's Row" back the early 00's (London, E2) Lloyd also fronts his own Big Print record label, promoting new musicians, including Hotpants Romance and Derek & His Bricks. In 2020, Lloyd was the subject of the documentary film King Rocker.

== Solo discography ==
Chart placings shown are from the UK Indie Chart.

=== Singles ===
- "Something Nice" (1988) In-Tape (#5)
- "Nothing Matters" (1988) In-Tape (#13)
- "Funeral Stomp" (1990) Virgin
- "Nothing Matters" (1990) Virgin

=== Albums ===
- Me and My Mouth (1990) Virgin
