= Hangover (disambiguation) =

A hangover is an unpleasant physiological effect often following excessive consumption of alcohol.

Hangover or Hungover may also refer to:

== Film and television ==
- The Hangover (film series), a trilogy of American comedy films
  - The Hangover, a 2009 film
  - The Hangover Part II, a 2011 film
  - The Hangover Part III, a 2013 film
- Hangover (2010 film), an Indian Bengali-language film
- Hangover (2014 film), an Indian Malayalam-language film
- "Hangover" (Sanctuary), an episode of Sanctuary

== Music ==
- The Hangovers (band), a British indie music group formed in 1998
- The Hangovers, an a cappella group formed in 1968, and their eponymous 1970 album

=== Albums ===
- The Hangover (Funkoars album) (2008)
- The Hangover (Gilby Clarke album) (1997)
- The Hangover (Obie Trice album) (2015)
- Hungover (album), a 2024 album by Ella Langley

=== Songs ===
==== "Hangover" ====
- "Hangover" (Taio Cruz song), 2011
- "Hangover" (Starboy Nathan song), 2011
- "Hangover" (Psy song), 2014
- "Hangover" (Emma Marrone song), 2024
- "Hangover", by America from the album Alibi, 1980
- "Hangover", by Betty Boo from the album GRRR! It's Betty Boo, 1992
- "Hangover", by Chris Brown from the album Heartbreak on a Full Moon, 2017
- "Hangover", by Max Webster from the album Max Webster, 1976
- "Hangover", by The Flee-Rekkers, 1961
- "Hangover", by Jason White, 2010
- "Hangover", by Serious Drinking, 1983

==== "Hungover" ====
- "Hungover", by 3OH!3 from Omens, 2013
- "Hungover", by Cascada from Original Me, 2011
- "Hungover", by Kesha from Animal, 2010
- "Hungover", by Michelle Williams from Unexpected, 2008
- "Hungover", by Shenseea from Alpha, 2022

== Art ==
- The Hangover (Suzanne Valadon), an 1887–1889 painting by Henri de Toulouse-Lautrec
- Hangover (sculpture), a 1991 sculpture by Andreas von Weizäcker

== Other uses ==
- A phenomenon in which a sports team that wins a championship performs poorly the following season, such as the Super Bowl hangover.

== See also ==
- Hungover You (disambiguation)
