= Eva Luna (album) =

Studio album by Moonshake
- Released: 26 October 1992
- Recorded: July–August 1992
- Studio: First Protocol, London
- Genre: Experimental rock; post-rock; dub; noise rock; sampledelia
- Length: 39:07
- Label: Too Pure, Atlantic, Matador
- Producer: Guy Fixsen, Moonshake

Moonshake chronology
Beautiful Pigeon EP (1992)	Eva Luna (1992)	Big Good Angel (1993)

Eva Luna is the debut studio album by British band Moonshake. It was released through Too Pure in October 1992.

Blending elements of experimental rock, post-punk, dub, psychedelia, hip hop and noise rock (with an extensive use of sampling), Eva Luna is often identified as a key album of 1990s British post-rock and sampledelia.

== Background ==
Led by former Wolfhound David Callahan and ex-Ultra Vivid Scene member Margaret Fiedler, Moonshake had first come to attention with the First EP, released on Creation Records in 1990, which had blended various experimental rock leanings with an interest in sampling technology, but which had been too much anchored to the indie rock/noise-rock tastes of the time, and which Callahan felt had also brought them an undeserved reputation as "shoegazey bandwagon jumpers." They'd followed up by signing to the Too Pure label and releasing the Secondhand Clothes and Beautiful Pigeon EPs, both which better incorporated their interest in the dub-bass-heavy post-punk sound of bands such as Public Image Limited and The Pop Group, and which also began gaining critical attention due to the band's unusual sample-driven and rhythmically propulsive sound drawing on breakbeats, electronica, psychedelia, art rock and Krautrock.

Moonshake had also developed a method of alternating between the different song-stylings of Callahan and Fiedler – each of whom contributed, sang and dominated songs which were simultaneously fleshed out and expanded by the other in terms of extra instrumentation and production ideas. Building on what he'd already achieved with The Wolfhounds, Callahan favoured a direct post-punk/garage rock approach with strident "bellow[ed] and sneer[ed]" vocals and lyrics featuring social awareness, social commentary and angry satire. Fiedler, in contrast, whispered or murmured most of her vocals, and created more impressionistic songs focussed on interior psychological landscapes and surreal takes on emotions, relationships and responses. This was later described by Louder Than War as making Moonshake, in effect, "two different bands in a head-on crush-collision. Which to all intents and purposes it was."

In spite of their different methods, Callahan and Fiedler were at this stage very appreciative and supportive of each other's work, being quite prepared to alternate the front-person role both in terms of songwriting and singing. Callahan has reflected "if you listen to the line-up with her and me, it's a schizophrenic band... It's got a dual personality. We did occasionally write songs together, but we were mostly flipsides to each other... But we'd also play with it more and have really noisy bits in her quiet songs and occasional really quiet bits in my noisy songs. The whole thing was meant to blend. There were definitely a lot of contradictions there, but that's interesting in a band, isn't it?"

== Writing and recording ==
Eva Luna was recorded over the summer and early autumn of 1992, at the now-defunct First Protocol Studios in Highbury, London (their sessions overlapping with some of the sessions for My Bloody Valentine's Loveless).

During the recording of the Secondhand Clothes and Beautiful Pigeon EPs, Moonshake had persistently experimented with deconstructing and dismantling their songs in the studio. Regarding the former, Callahan remembers "Margaret [spending] most of the session with headphones, on a sampler, just trying to match things to the music. She turned a song I wrote into something a bit more forward-looking... And then when we got to the studio, we took it apart more. It was all about deconstruction and putting it back together in different ways. And it worked really well."

This approach was carried over into, and further refined in, the Eva Luna sessions. Callahan credited much of this approach to the influence of Gang Starr and other hip hop acts, "slowing things down, playing the stereo one a bit slower then the other one a bit faster, running things backwards, playing the samples like an instrument.... We really loved that. We thought, "Well, we can do the same and perhaps we can write songs with this stuff."..." He also mentions "the way-out Stooges of Fun House, where they had Steve Mackay playing sax" being an influence on the album.

The album's lyrical subject matter was often uncompromising, taking in at various times urban alienation, English insularity, prostitution and sex-murder, ecological issues and abortion. Louder Than War has commented "[Callahan's songs] are all angry, vitriolic diatribes about human injustice and dysfunctional societal subjects set to keening, urgently propulsive arrangements, underpinned by those huge dub basslines, off-kilter hip hop drum patterns and topped with shards of acidic, coruscating post-punk guitars with all kinds of disorientating samples thrown into the mix: bhangra motifs, shrieking brass and saxophone interjections (although some of these are also played live), detuned keyboard effects, creaking doors, machinery, etc." The same review commented on Fiedler's vocal approach, deeming it "more subtle and cryptically insidious : never has the art of whispered vocals carried with it such an air of true menace and unease. Whilst Fiedler's vocals may be low in the mix, the discordant maelstrom that whips around her, sometimes delivered through defiantly obtuse jazzy time signatures, creates an even greater sense of dislocation. The fact that many of her lyrics concern psychological dread, neurotic sexual obsessions or depravity, and suburban paranoia, merely accentuates this. Due to this dichotomy, the dynamic shifts on some of her compositions are, if anything, even more polarised and extreme than those of her writing partner, who favours a more direct and "straight between the eyes" approach."

Regarding his own contributions, Callahan has commented "I don't think it was didactic. It wasn't like lecturing people. I was trying to have fun and be creative with what was around me, and we weren't living in the best of situations, really. There was no money and places were kind of squalid. It's what you do to be in a band a lot of the time. But it was just reflecting... the city of London seemed to be decaying."

Callahan recalls the band as having been "well prepared" for the Eva Luna recording sessions, following extensive rehearsing (with co-producer/engineer Guy Fixsen already involved for advice), but that they'd also embraced opportunities to improve the material further while in studio. "One song in particular, "Wanderlust", was mostly Margaret's music but with my bassline and my singing over the top. We wanted that one more open ended so we could experiment with it in the studio. But for a lot of it, you'd play these songs live, take them in the studio, and realize some parts weren't working. You'd have to think on your feet... We would make sure that we got good live drum takes for a start. There would be some click tracks sometimes and there would be a bit of cut and pasting, but you really couldn't do a lot of that then... Dropping someone in to continue a take was about the best you could do at the time. So those are live drums, most of them. One or two are loops off a sampler, but we tried to confuse it so you wouldn't know which was live and which was a sample."

"Trying to get all those different noisy guitars to sound separate from each other, but somehow still the same, was a challenge. It was a lot of fun. I remember sending some demos to Terry Edwards — he played the horns on it — and he came in and I just said to him, "Can you do some kind of free jazz on bits of it? And can you do an Ennio Morricone trumpet thing on the third verse?" I just thought he'd do something kind of token, but he came and did these amazing horn parts, and it just really lifts the whole song... [It's] a noisy, Stooges-inspired song... but it just takes it so much further, almost into jazz. I'm just really happy with the way that came out. It was such fun to hear someone doing such good parts on your songs. I couldn't recommend it more, to farm it out to people like Terry."

Eva Luna ultimately satisfied both Fiedler and Callahan as a record. Callahan: "We knew we'd done something really good... We thought the Secondhand Clothes EP and [Eva Luna] had everything the band should be about on it. It had everything. We certainly thought we'd done something that was true to us that would either be ignored for being too out there or would make an impression. And, fortunately, it made an impression. We wanted it to be both weird and have songs. We wanted it to have an upside-down kind of layering. It needed to have big bass and drums, like some dub or funk records, but we also wanted to find ways to incorporate the samples in a way that didn't sound like they were sellotaped on, like so many other bands. We wanted it to be completely enmeshed in the songs and the music. And I think we succeeded with that."

== Releases and reissue ==
=== Original release ===
Eva Luna was released in the UK and France by Too Pure on 26 October 1992. An American release (featuring a reshuffled tracklisting and the addition of the songs from the Secondhand Clothes EP) followed on Atlantic Records/Matador Records in 1993. Cover art in both cases was by "King of Fuck", a.k.a. Mat Ducasse, a member of Skylab.

=== 2020/2023 reissues ===
After years of being out of print and unavailable for download, Eva Luna was reissued in download-only format by Too Pure (by that time, part of the Beggars Banquet group) in 2020.

In 2023, a full remastered version followed in both vinyl and download formats, via Beggars Arkive. Callahan and Fiedler contributed to the process of remastering and repackaging the record. The reissue featured the US track order with the addition of the Secondhand Clothes EP and the B-sides from the Beautiful Pigeon EP ("Beeside" and "Home Survival Kit"). It also included versions of four songs from Moonshake's BBC John Peel radio sessions. The Peel Session recordings were also released separately on vinyl as part of Beggars Arkive's 2024 BBC Radio Sessions project, as one of ten vinyl discs purchased and received via subscription.

== Critical reception ==
Professional ratings
Review scores
Source	Rating
AllMusic	4/5 stars
New Musical Express	8/10 stars

=== Contemporary reviews ===
In New Musical Express, John Mulvey enthused "forget the claims of '70s revivalists — however attractive their music — to be the guardians of British music, Moonshake sound exactly how a band lost in London, 1992, and caught in the cultural crossfire should: vivid, intense, discomforting, fuelled by a sonic crush collision where truculent avant-rock is brilliantly mangled with hip hop, dub, free jazz, bhangra and a sense-scrambling barrage of samples. Hell, this is ambitious stuff… [This is] an exceptional record. Moonshake never cheapen their stories, never exploit their subjects, never preach or pass judgement… The result is an endlessly challenging, confrontational social document, no less. It demands your serious respect." The album was voted into the magazine's top 50 records of the year (at number 41), with the EP "Secondhand Clothes" being voted the 28th best single of the year.

In The Wire, Kevin Martin followed a similar train of thought to Mulvey, stating "Moonshake are city dwellers enthralled and appalled by urban dog-eat-dog survivalism. On Eva Luna tales of love and loathing are set in a cosmopolitan dub zone, where disparate styles clash and the musical bulk is shadowed by relentless percussion and furtive sampled figures... Fiedler's torched singing sounds traumatised – as her sinister whispers outline internal persecutions in a Lewis Carroll world of beasts and birds. Callahan’s unforgiving raps initially overpowers with brute rhetoric... Moonshake are perfecting their own flow motion capable of matching Can... but where the flow of ‘70s German rock craved spiritual freedom and open spaces, Moonshake are moved by claustrophobia and enforced confinement. Their rhythmic mobility, shrouded by endless loops and discords, maps out an inner city neurosis which rivals PiL's "Death Disco" for Low End disturbance and Uneasy Listening."

In Melody Maker, Jim Irvin struck a more cautious note, commenting that "Eva Luna is Moonshake's big book of wild stories... There's a sting in every tale, too – Moonshake are designed to unsettle – and a collection that proves they've quietly grown into tone of the most original groups we’ve got. But loveable?... There's a pervading sense of Inner City Dope Dole Hippy about them, something a bit grimy and squatty with an ugly underside... Such abrasiveness is in danger of making Moonshake that most hideous of things: worthy. Yuk. It threatens to turn their music into something you admire rather than love, but then I feel the same about Can, the Fall, Captain Beefheart, things which infuse the Moonshake sound [which] can be as wild and humid and all-consuming as a thunderstorm... They display a refreshing willingness to explore, an aural sense of adventure... It's deadly serious. Deadly full stop. Delightfully difficult listening."

=== Retrospective reviews ===
In 1999, Eva Luna was voted 77th out of the top 100 LPs of the 1990s in Alternative Press. In 2005, the Italian magazine Blow Up included it in its list of "600 Essential Albums".

In AllMusic, Steve Huey reflected that "Eva Luna is bursting with ideas and tension; dissonant instrumental lines careen off of both samples and spacey dream pop textures, resting on a bed of hypnotic dub bass grooves and deliberate, deeply funky percussion... Callahan delivers his tales of despairing cynicism and rage over modern urban life with theatrical growls and nasal wails, while Fiedler's hushed murmurs and understated purr belie the aggression lurking under her songs' often nightmarish psycho-sexual dramas. Above all, Eva Luna's sound collages are dark and edgy, regardless of whether their overall tone is mellow or furious; the album's dense layers of sonic detail and the ebb and flow between Callahan and Fiedler's contrasting songwriting styles make it a richly inventive, endlessly fascinating listen..." In a Trouser Press overview of Moonshake's work, Douglas Wolk described the music of Eva Luna as being "always big, weird and unnerving", singling out "the whomping single "Beautiful Pigeon"" and "Callahan's best song, a cancerous dub-rock slither called "City Poison"."

A 2008 posting on the Young British Nationalist blog (covering "Rock Music: The Definitive History") mentioned Moonshake in connection with 1990s British post-rock. It described Eva Luna as having "reduced the song format to a plasma of rhythmic and melodic fragments on [its] atmospheric experiments... A bold synthesis of psychedelia, trip-hop and jazz, [Moonshake's] sound basically upgraded Public Image Ltd.'s sound to the age of sampling."

Writing eighteen years after the album's release, for a 2010 feature in Tiny Mix Tapes, Lavi Che stated that "Moonshake should by all rights be legendary. However, they remain one of the most distressingly slept-on bands of the 1990s, dropping three albums and a handful of singles and EPs that earned deserved critical plaudits but — as often proves the case with bands that test and warp one’s conception of music — failed to find much of an audience, although they weren’t outright ignored... Moonshake's records have aged really well in the past 15-20 years. Most of their songs sound like they were committed to tape just yesterday… Eva Luna is a hard album to immerse yourself in, requiring multiple listens (as in the case of this reviewer) before it really clicks." Che named "Seen and Not Heard" as the record's highlight, stating that "in this reviewer’s subjective and inflated opinion (it) should have done for music in 1992 what "Smells Like Teen Spirit" did for 1991."

Retrospectively reviewing Eva Luna in 2013, Giana Avelli of Ondarock - while ultimately approving of the album - dismissed the idea of it being a post-rock record, instead locating it firmly as a reiteration of post-punk and suggesting that this also meant that it had aged better than contemporary 1990s records by post-rock artists such as Seefeel and Disco Inferno. Pointing to the relative brevity of the songs on Eva Luna as indicating their separation from post-rock, Avelli instead reinforced the album's connection to post-punk artists such as PiL, Gordon Gano, Rip Rig + Panic and The Pop Group, concluding that what Moonshake did was to "take the groove (funk, dub, jazz)... burden it with an industrial aftertaste and project it into the '90s", reasoning "although still far from the idea of post-rock as a new progressive rock, there was often a tendency to plot over the long term, creating a hypnotic sense and perception in the making, while here the songs are played in the short term." Pietre Miliari of Ondarock also added Eva Luna to the magazine's list of "Rock Milestones".

As part of an in-depth examination of both band and record (in Louder than War in 2022), Martin Gray described the album as "a complete anomaly among the sounds of 1992", "an album simply crammed with... highlights", "exhilarating sturm and drang" and "a formidable statement of intent" (as well as in lyrical content, being "disturbingly prescient today in the light of what we have just witnessed in the past couple of years post-pandemic and post-Brexit."). Praising the "utterly spellbinding, dizzyingly genre-defying approach at articulating explicitly the sound of a city in the throes of urban psychosis and derangement" and describing the first half of the album as "a totally astonishing five-song salvo", Gray's review took note of what he saw as the record's musical callbacks to Sun Ra, bhangra, free jazz and Raymond Scott cartoon scores; and he tagged original album opener "Wanderlust" in particular as "a curiously bizarre hybrid of eastern exoticism, Afro rhythms and boho free jazz tempered by an insistent — almost swinging — percussive backbeat, embellished with the oddest samples you will hear: all detuned arpeggios, clangs and fluttering snatches of urban detritus. It really sounds like nothing else." Gray concluded that "Eva Luna really is one hell of a ground-breaking record, and it stands resolutely alone among all of the albums released in 1992 as no other band has managed to create anything remotely similar before or since. It really is a unique album with few equals."

While reviewing Callahan's third solo album, Down to the Marshes, in 2024, Dave Cantrell of Stereo Embers recalled how Eva Luna had not "simply knock[ed] me sideways but seemed to open up a fresh new chamber in my listening heart. Shapeshifting, knowing but vulnerable, its offhand archness of tone offset by its ability to nonetheless scorch your senses, there was this peculiar, somewhat elliptical directness to the Moonshake vibe, not least due the sinuous, often minor key but incandescent guitar lines snaking through the mix that somehow managed to simultaneously capture via its melodies while leaving you pleasingly off-balance with its cleverly disjointed structures. It was, in a phrase, intriguing beyond measure... and I, like many others, was hooked on the Callahan MO forevermore."

Eva Luna was voted the 23rd best post-rock LP in the Fact Mag 2016 poll feature of "the 30 best post-rock albums of all time" with John Twells suggesting "while [they] pre-dated the “proper” post-rock scene by a couple of years, their experimentation undoubtedly informed what was just around the corner. Blending the misty haze of dream pop and shoegaze with ideas (including their band name) cribbed from Can and the krautrock scene, the band's approach was to throw everything into the mix and see what happened. This proved successful, and Eva Luna sounds prescient even now with its soupy fusion of flavours and techniques...They might not have shared the loudness or riffing of their later peers, but their experimentation captured the very essence of the genre."

Eva Luna was also voted the 33rd best post-rock album in the "50 Best Post-Rock Albums" poll feature in Treble Zine in 2024, with Jeff Terich commenting "cock your head a little and view it at just the right angle, and Eva Luna just might scan as a pop record. Which it arguably is, as much as or perhaps even more so than any other record on this list, but Moonshake's debut album reaches that destination through curious means. Dubby basslines intersect with shoegaze guitars, early trip hop beat experiments, samples of obscure ’60s psych records, hypnotic loops and otherworldly psychedelia. It's less a grab bag of genre exercises than a curious fusion of seemingly all of them at once, floating through space-age bass noir in "Bleach and Salt Water", tumbling through uneasy psychedelic waters in "Little Thing" and finding hooks in unlikely places in "City Poison"."

=== Reissue reviews ===
The reissue of the album in 2023 provided the opportunity for further reviews and coverage, now with thirty years of further perspective. Awarding the record 9-out-of-10 in their in-house reviews pages, Norman Records referred to it as "one of the most underrated debuts of the Nineties. A thrilling collision of sampledelia, shoegaze and post-punk - imagine if someone put early hip hop, My Bloody Valentine and PiL in a blender..."

Reviewing the reissue for Brainwashed, Anthony D'Amico revealed "listening to this expanded reissue now with considerably more adventurous ears, I still find this album oft-frustrating, but I am newly struck by how almost every song features at least one moment where Moonshake sounded like the best band on the goddamn planet... While the swirling chaos of the crescendo of "Mugshot Heroine" stands as an especially unhinged and wonderful moment, nearly every song contains at least one god-tier noise freakout or killer sample and every song features an absolutely stellar rhythm section (John Frenett and "Mig" Moreland) that can rival PiL or Can at their best (groove-wise, at least). Someone really needs to produce an instrumental dub companion from these masters with all the '90s alt rock elements stripped away, as it would be an absolute banger."

D'Amico appreciated the inclusion of the two Fiedler-era Moonshake EPs, Secondhand Clothes and Beautiful Pigeon, judging them "generally every bit as good as Eva Luna...The band's previously bootleg-only 1992 Peel Session is a bit of an inspired inclusion as well, as Callahan and Fiedler switch vocal duties for alternate versions of a few of their strongest songs... Moonshake at their best rivals the finest work of any of their more revered influences or contemporaries."

In another extensive essay (on Medium), Melissa Thyme Monroe drew attention to the band's use of noise rock (at a time when the genre was under-explored within British music as compared to the American scene), as well as commenting on their employment of psychedelic approaches and their connections with trip hop. Monroe also took note of the effects of the dual songwriter approach in terms of both art and politics. "There’s an ebb and flow generated on the album that waves between the bombastic pain of city life and the insidiousness of empty houses. The original sequencing does this dynamic justice, juxtaposing these songs right next to each other. The lyricism from both songwriters contrast in a much similar way, with Fiedler diverting from her relatively conscious counterpart by creating whispery poetry around odd, uncomfortable imagery like pot-bellied she-wolves and animals eating other animals..."

Monroe concluded that "while the archived history of the band didn't highlight much internal tumult, give or take the confused label fiascos plaguing them since birth, it was certainly unstable. This volatility lead to some of the best music in the '90s, however — certainly rhizomatic in their influences but clear in its modus operandi of transgressive sonic art through the distortion of convention. It also has the uneasy, almost unfinished discomfort that I feel is sorely missing from music these days: one that isn't afraid of being loud in the cityscape, that is dissatisfied and angry at the daily wrongs that hostile urban governments force upon you."

A number of writers, including Monroe, have suggested that Eva Luna is not only the most significant Moonshake album but also the essential one, on which they perfected their art (with Monroe commenting "Moonshake's debut album was like lightning in a bottle that escaped shortly after capture").

== Track listing ==
=== Original UK/France release ===
No.	Title	Writer(s)	Length
1.	"Wanderlust"	David Callahan, Margaret Fiedler	4:43
2.	"Tar Baby"	Fiedler	3:34
3.	"Seen and Not Heard"	Callahan	4:18
4.	"Bleach and Salt Water"	Fiedler	3:40
5.	"Little Thing"	Fiedler	3:16
6.	"City Poison"	Callahan	4:07
7.	"Sweetheart"	Fiedler	2:47
8.	"Spaceship Earth"	Callahan	4:36
9.	"Beautiful Pigeon"	Fiedler	3:27
10.	"Mugshot Heroine"	Callahan, Mig Morland	4:39
Total length:			39:07

=== US release ===
No.	Title	Writer(s)	Length
1.	"City Poison"	Callahan	4:07
2.	"Sweetheart"	Fiedler	2:47
3.	"Spaceship Earth"	Callahan	4:36
4.	"Beautiful Pigeon"	Fiedler	3:27
5.	"Mugshot Heroine"	Callahan, Morland	4:39
6.	"Wanderlust"	Callahan, Fiedler	4:43
7.	"Tar Baby"	Fiedler	3:34
8.	"Seen and Not Heard"	Callahan	4:18
9.	"Bleach and Salt Water"	Fiedler	3:40
10.	"Little Thing"	Fiedler	3:16
11.	"Secondhand Clothes"	Callahan	3:58
12.	"Blister"	Fiedler	3:30
13.	"Drop in the Ocean"	Callahan	6.22
Total length:			52:37

=== 2023 deluxe vinyl edition ===
Side one
No.	Title	Writer(s)	Length
1.	"City Poison"	Callahan	4:07
2.	"Sweetheart"	Fiedler	2:47
3.	"Spaceship Earth"	Callahan	4:36
4.	"Beautiful Pigeon"	Fiedler	3:27
5.	"Mugshot Heroine"	Callahan, Morland	4:39
Total length:			19:36

Side two
No.	Title	Writer(s)	Length
1.	"Wanderlust"	Callahan, Fiedler	4:43
2.	"Tar Baby"	Fiedler	3:34
3.	"Seen and Not Heard"	Callahan	4:18
4.	"Bleach and Salt Water"	Fiedler	3:40
5.	"Little Thing"	Fiedler	3:16
Total length:			19:31

Side three
No.	Title	Writer(s)	Length
1.	"Secondhand Clothes"	Callahan	3:58
2.	"Blister"	Fiedler	3:30
3.	"Beeside"	Callahan	3:34
4.	"Home Survival Kit"	Fiedler, Callahan	3:03
5.	"Drop in the Ocean"	Callahan	6.22
Total length:			20:27

Side four
No.	Title	Writer(s)	Length
1.	"Coming (BBC Radio 1 John Peel Session)"	Callahan	5:39
2.	"Beautiful Pigeon (BBC Radio 1 John Peel Session)"	Fiedler	3:17
3.	"Sweetheart (BBC Radio 1 John Peel Session)"	Fiedler	2:36
4.	"Mugshot Heroine (BBC Radio 1 John Peel Session)"	Callahan, Morland	4:38
Total length:			16:08 75:42

== Personnel ==
Credits adapted from liner notes.

Moonshake

- David Callahan – vocals, sampler, guitar, etc.
- Margaret Fiedler – vocals, sampler, guitar, synthesizer, cello, etc.
- John Frenett – bass guitar
- Mig Morland – drums, percussion

Additional musicians

- Terry Edwards – trumpet, saxophones
- Yvonne Lacey – flute

Production

- Guy Fixsen – production, engineering
- Moonshake – production

Artwork and design

- K.o.F. (King of Fuck) – sleeve artwork and lettering
