= English Primitive I =

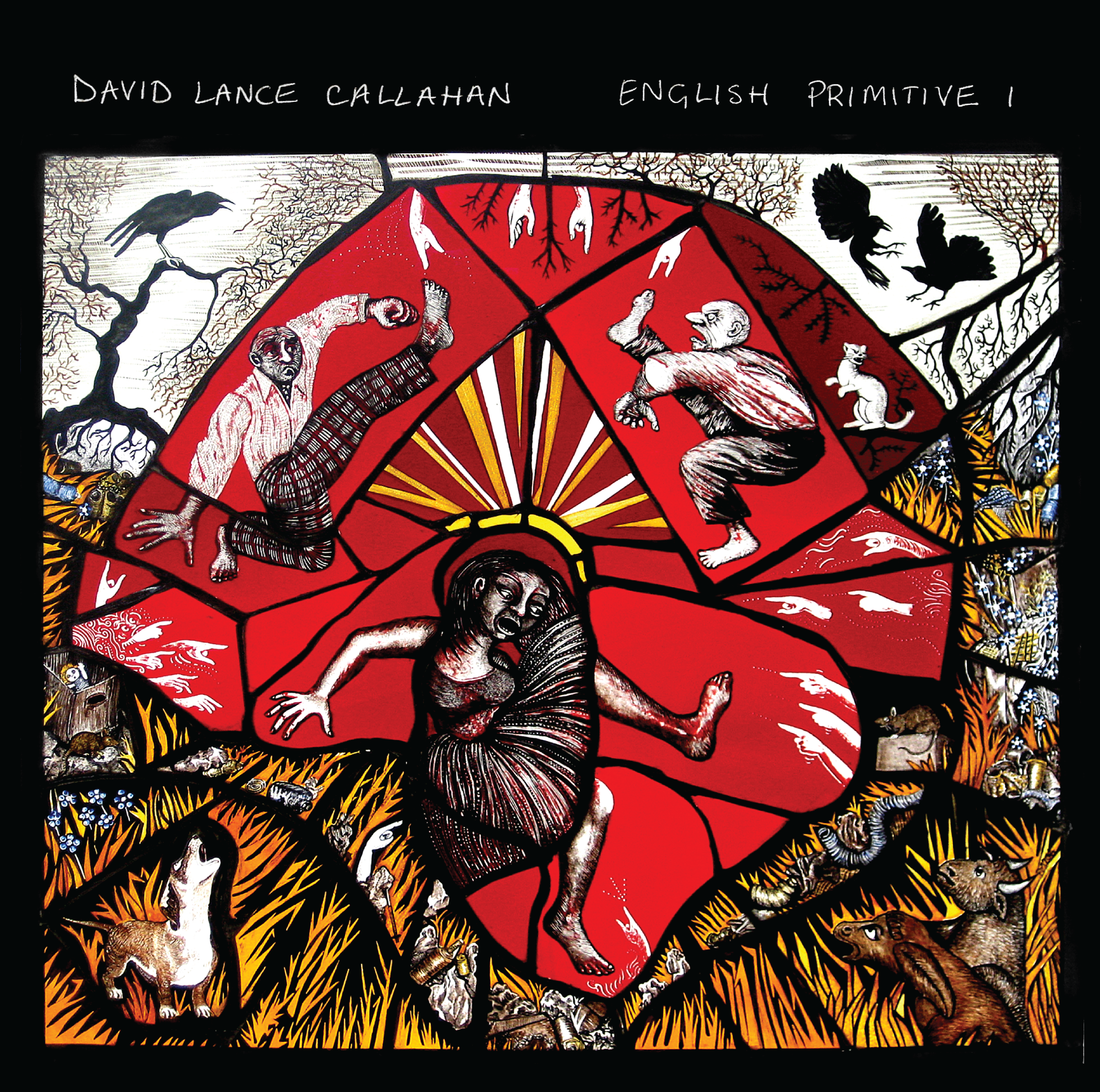

Studio album by David Lance Callahan
- Released: 29 October 2021
- Genre: Psychedelic folk; singer-songwriter; experimental rock
- Length: 42:16
- Label: Tiny Global Productions
- Producer: David Lance Callahan

David Lance Callahan chronology
English Primitive I (2021)	English Primitive II (2022)

English Primitive I is the debut studio album by David Lance Callahan. It was released through Tiny Global Productions in 2021.

== Background and production ==
During a lull in activity with the reformed Wolfhounds in the late 2010s, David Lance Callahan began playing solo gigs in London, performing on vocals and unaccompanied electric guitar. This resulted in the release of his first solo single "She Passes Through the Night" as part of the 2018 "Seven at 77" singles series by Where It's at is Where You Are Records. This was followed in 2019 by a second single, "Strange Lovers", on Slumberland Records.

Whereas Wolfhounds had given vent to Callahan's electric garage rock instincts – and his other main previous band Moonshake had enabled him to explore experimental post-punk/art rock/hip hop production ideas – he had also been a long-standing fan of English and American folk or blues artists such as Tim Buckley, John Lee Hooker, John Martyn, Nick Drake and Martin Carthy (as well as having a broader interest in West African and Eastern European music). Solo work provided an opportunity to pursue these lines of interest, with the 2020 COVID-19 pandemic offering space for completion. In an interview at writewyattuk, Callahan clarified that "it all came together during lockdown, when there wasn't a lot else to do other than catch up on my books, film and write songs really... there were a few things already recorded, but yeah, once we weren’t allowed to leave the house I basically finished off more than a double-LP's worth of material and got Tiny Global to agree to put them out."

The album's press release stated that "Callahan has outdone himself on this long-awaited solo album, the results of which merit the sort of deep dive best explained with ample time and a quality turntable. Whether English Primitive I is a product of the past year's isolation or of a long-simmering brew only now ready for dissemination is something Callahan has yet to reveal. Whatever its origins, the album is the work of a massive talent. Wolfhoundian riffage offered enough ramshackle charm to somewhat obscure Callahan's darker, more penetrating writing... This is his masterwork, a mélange of what has been called 'mutant Eastern, West African, folk, blues and post-punk influences' . . . an improbable cross-cultural gumbo, yet one which coalesced into a swirling, kaleidoscopic psychedelia of emotion unlike any other record in this era. As with any recording favouring the avant-garde — works like Balaklava, Brian Jones Presents the Pipes of Pan at Joujouka, and The Heart of the Congos — one might expect that the impact of English Primitive I will be revealed slowly, over a much longer span of time than the too-often workaday product of today's independent music scene. With this album, Callahan takes his place alongside cult heroes Robert Wyatt, Scott Walker and Cathal Coughlan as a prime example of seemingly limitless artistic expression."

The core of the record was Callahan performing as singer and solo electric guitar player. There were also contributions from two long-standing Callahan associates — brass and woodwind player Terry Edwards (of Gallon Drunk/PJ Harvey band), and former Pram/Nightingales/Fall drummer Daren Garratt. Further contributions were made by Alison Cotton (vocal/viola player with The Left Outsides and Eighteenth Day of May) and former Evans the Death singer Katherine Mountain Whitaker. One song ("One Rainy September") employed the Iskra Strings Quartet, while two others incorporated sampler in a similar manner to Callahan's Moonshake work. On "Foxboy", Callahan also used "a cheap digital tanpura-tabla [bought] online from India."

The cover design was based on "Landfill Tantrum", a stained glass artwork by Pumajaw's Pinkie Maclure.

== Releases ==
English Primitive I was released by Tiny Global Productions on 29 October 2021.

== Critical reception ==
Professional ratings
Review scores
Source	Rating
Mojo	4/4 stars
Into Creative	(excellent)
Backstreet Mafia	8.8/10 stars
Louder than War	(excellent)
Penny Black Music	(excellent)

Upon release, English Primitive I received very positive reviews.

In Mojo, Martin Aston wrote "For his first — terrific — solo album, David Lance Callahan has gone against type... The singer locates a common ground between trad British folk and Saharan blues, with an occasional injection of Eastern strings. Seven frequently lengthy drone-based ballads demand more of Callahan's vibrant, stark voice than before, and not known for guitar-playing until now, his snaking, thrumming patterns suit the earthy mood. Lyrically, English Primitive I is an uncanny mixture too. Between two class-war tracts — the sarky "Born of the Welfare State Was I" and a sombre "Always" — feverish visions of outliers abound, such as the Goatman ("spriggan eight-foot tall") and the feral outcast "Foxboy", but also "One Rainy September"'s heartbreaking parent/child breakdown and a slyly romantic "She's the King of My Life"."

Reviewing English Primitive I for Into Creative, Grant McPhee enthused further over the "dark, English folk influences", adding "this album is no throwback or hipster pastiche... If Thurston Moore had joined Steeleye Span along with Martin Carthy, and if perhaps John Coltrane was there to help out a little, you'd get some idea of where this album takes you — blistering freak-out guitar that dives in and out of the beautiful melodies... But there is also some achingly sad minimalism too, often with just a deceptively simple guitar tone and voice that clearly has studied the form well. Drones play an important part in this record too which is another welcome addition and it's very pleasing to hear a little hint of Nico's phenomenal Marble Index... Beautiful is a word that accurately describes much of the music on this album but with a qualifier that it is a particular form of beauty reserved for those who find beauty in shadowy moonlit glades, swamps lit with corpse-lights, ghostly hellhounds on lonely roads and music filled with dark drones, discord and bleakness."

Writing for Backseat Mafia, Chris Sawle described the album as "a deep, complex excursion into the raga-folk form – taking as a sonic touchstone a certain brand of exploratory British psychedelic folk at its height from '68 to '72, and bending it to a new and more earthbound, socially documentarian thrust", suggesting that "we're the English primitives whose lives he seeks to recount, bringing us seven tales of the less cushy life couched in a mutant Eastern scales-meets-post-punk fire... The punk-refracted folk has a slow-burn, contemporary bone-chill and quiet desperation last seen over in Manchester at former labelmates King of the Slums." Identifying the album as "both small- and big-P political (and if you follow Callahan anywhere on socials, you'll know the post-war settlement espoused in this song is absolutely a hill he would die on — and rightly so)", Sawles warns "you're gonna have to work at it a little; no puppy of a record, eager to please, this. You can sense immediately how much more there is to be gained from repeat listening and how much yet to unfold. Other killer lines reaching out; other crescendos catching you with their amassed energy. It's the sort of record that one day ought to pitch up on social history syllabuses as a true reflection of a broiling, fracturing period in which it looks likely the humble populace may come off worst... What a time to be alive. Be glad that David can see clearly and crystallise it for us."

John Robb, writing in Louder than War, states that "David Callahan has created something truly special — a drone masterpiece... a captivating and haunting work. The enthralling and captivating album somehow joins the dots between the terror at the heart of old English folk, the landscape drones of West African Gnawa and desert blues, a post-punk template, John Cale drones of the Velvets and the deep dark resonance of a very English psychedelia and even hints of the Revolver-era Beatles tinged with the dread LSD... these are songs that capture the discontent of these times in hypnotic scenarios that are like all the best parts of psychedelia and medieval folk combined into an unholy whole... Lyrically brilliant, it's a stark political snapshot that deals with the darkness of the Covid era better than most any other release of the moment. A future time capsule of these times steeped in a music that lasts forever. I beg and implore you to wallow in its genius – this is no normal release but almost the culmination of a lifetime on the creative fringes poetically observing the madness."

Reviewing the album in Penny Black Music, Kimberley Bright wrote "David Lance Callahan may be an anti-hero but English Primitive I proves he is a national treasure... This is a diverse, weighty, and sometimes perplexing — in a good way — album... He utilizes raga, traditional English folk, first generation psychedelic wyrd folk, punk, West African Gnawa, and more exotic-sounding scales than anyone this side of prog rock. There is a persistent droning pedal note in the background throughout that has an unsettling effect. Callahan has been described as a social documentarian, and that description certainly fits this material. "Born of the Welfare State" might someday be covered by Billy Bragg to celebrate the original post-war ideal compassionate society — the NHS, state schools, housing, healthy food, and subsidized job training — in contrast to the attacks on these institutions today... "Goatman", "Foxboy" and "She Passes Through the Night" are long and involved, sounding like dark pre-New Age pagan epics... It was a long time coming, but English Primitive I may well be one of those classic, genre-defying albums that will be looked back on as being more influential than anyone suspected it would."

== Track listing ==
All tracks are written by David Lance Callahan.

No.	Title	Length
1.	"Born of the Welfare State Was I"	4:17
2.	"Goatman"	4:25
3.	"Foxboy"	8:26
4.	"She's the King of My Life"	4:36
5.	"She Passes Through the Night"	7:10
6.	"One Rainy September"	8:25
7.	"Always"	4:36
Total length:		42:16

== Personnel ==
(Credits adapted from Bandcamp and Discogs.com entries plus album liner notes.)

- David Lance Callahan – vocals, electric guitar, Radel-Milan digital tanpura-tabla (3), sampler (3,4), handclaps (5)

with:

- Katherine Mountain Whitaker – vocal (1,6)
- Terry Edwards – trumpet & flute (1)
- Daren Garratt – drums (1,6)
- Alison Cotton – viola & vocals (5)
- The Iskra Strings (John Smart, Emma Owens, Verity Simmons and James Underwood) – string quartet (6)
- Dan Fordham – string arrangement (6)

Production

- David Lance Callahan – production & mixing; recording (2,3,4,6,7)
- Rory Attwell – mixing & mastering; recording (1,2,5),
- Terry Edwards – recording (1)
- Ant Chapman, Mark Nicholas – recording (5)

Artwork and design

- David Lance Callahan – cover concept
- Andy Royston (at Tropical Sundae) – art direction
- Pinkie Maclure – cover image
