= English Primitive II =

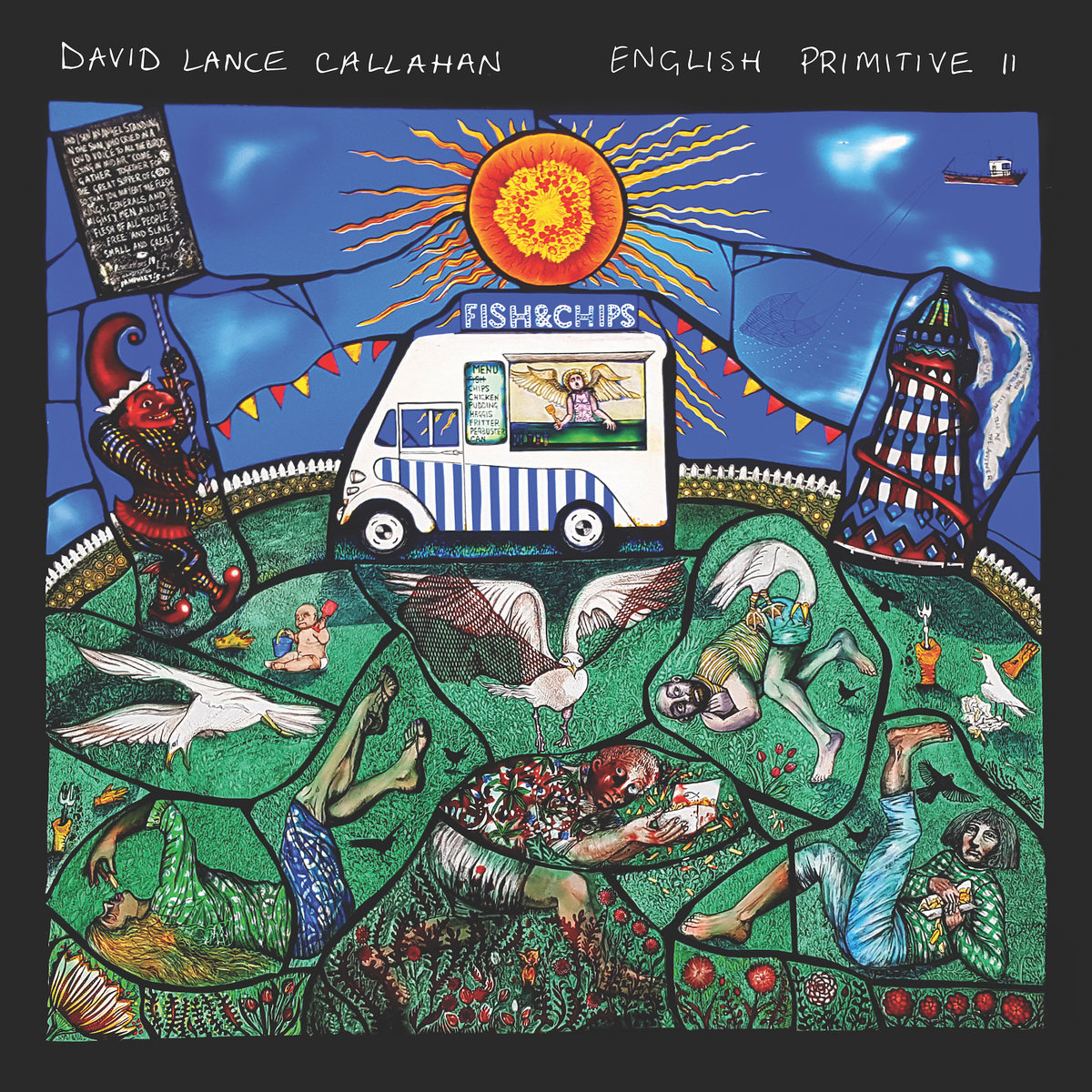

Studio album by David Lance Callahan
- Released: 15 November 2022
- Genres: Psychedelic folk; singer-songwriter; experimental rock
- Length: 41:43
- Label: Tiny Global Productions
- Producer: David Lance Callahan

David Lance Callahan chronology
English Primitive I (2021)	English Primitive II (2022)	Down to the Marshes (2024)

English Primitive II is the second studio album by David Lance Callahan. It was released through Tiny Global Productions in 2022.

== Background and production ==
Most of the tracks on English Primitive II were recorded at the same time as those which were released on its predecessor, English Primitive I, and comprise the second set of material from the sessions which David Lance Callahan had recorded mostly at home during the 2020 pandemic lockdown, following a period of playing solo gigs in London with just his electric guitar. As with the first set, they explore Callahan's interest in American and English folk music, West African music (predominantly Gnawa) and Eastern European music, filtered through his post-punk/experimental rock experience and his thoughts on political matters such as the creation and destruction of the British post-war settlement and welfare state.

The press release for the project announced "the follow-up to last year's first volume, English Primitive II continues the themes introduced previously in a harder, more electric and psychedelic style... if EP I showcased the 'songs of innocence', this new set comprises 'songs of experience'. Callahan's lyrical themes here are frequently the sleaze and corruption of our 'betters', the intentional and unintentional brutality meted out on those weaker and the sometimes perverse ways in which this happens. There are moments of reflection among the broken mirrors, but they allow scant solace or reassurance... EP II rises above its origins and invades the wider world, in all its colour, grit and glory. Each song serves as a monument to its internal tale – in fact, the whole LP is as much a collection of musical short stories as it is an album of songs."

Songs on the album included "Invisible Man" ("the impression of a regular person with hidden grievances, biding his time and waiting to lash out"); "Beautiful Launderette" ("a sleazy celebration of Britain's position as the laundering capital of the world"), "The Parrot" ("a prolonged evisceration of governmental mouthpieces and their court stenographers") "Bear Factory" ("the real-life story of the murder of one of the singer's primary-school classmates in the 1970s, and true in every detail"), "Orgy of the Ancients" ("the intimate intricacies of ageing politicians and the press as they decide whether to go to war") and a setting of William Blake's Songs of Experience poem "London" as "London by Blakelight" ("in a groovier setting than we're used to... if London swings, it's from the Tyburn tree.")

As with the first English Primitive volume, English Primitive II was predominantly based around Callahan on voice and solo electric guitar. However, the album featured a greater use of sampler than on its predecessor (with Callahan using it on five of the eight tracks), and acoustic guitar on one song.

As with English Primitive I, former Pram/Nightingales/Fall drummer Daren Garratt returned to play on four tracks, the Iskra String Quartet performed on one track ("Bear Factory") and former Evans the Death singer Katherine Mountain Whitaker sang harmony vocals on four tracks (as well as being entrusted with full lead vocals on "The Burnet Rose"). Anja Büchele (Callahan's former bandmate from his short-lived late '90s/early 2000s band The $urp!u$) contributed vocals and synthesizer to "The Scapegoat", while Callahan's co-recorder/mixer Rory Atwell contributed tambourine and digital synthesizer on two separate tracks.

The cover design depicts "Fish and Chips", a stained glass artwork by Pumajaw's Pinkie Maclure.

== Releases ==
English Primitive II was released by Tiny Global Productions on 15 November 2022.

== Critical reception ==
Professional ratings
Review scores
Source	Rating
Mojo	4/5 stars
Silent Radio	(excellent)
Ondarock	8.3/10 stars
Penny Black Music	(excellent)
AudioReview	(excellent/Album of the Month)

Like its predecessor, English Primitive II received very positive reviews.

In Mojo, Kieron Tyler wrote "lyrically, the second of former Wolfhounds and Moonshake frontman David Callahan's vignettes of his personal concerns is acute and compelling. A barely restrained anger courses throughout. Musically, the album is as sharp as its subject matter — the framing flows with seeming effortlessness. Odd rhythms invoke Future Days Can, piercing psychedelic guitar connects late–'60s Richard Thompson with today's sub–Saharan musical adventurers. It's where the Extricate Fall could have gone if North African psychedelia was a fascination. English Primitive II is a thoughtful, engrossing account of an individual's worldview."

In Silent Radio, Andrew Neal announced "to those asking whether the second volume [of English Primitive] could maintain such distinguished standards, the short answer is an emphatic 'Yes'... Musically, English Primitive II is harder and more psychedelic than its predecessor but knits together an impressive range of left-field influences into coherent shape... The powerful and those who do work on their behalf frequently come under Callahan's microscope..." Taking note of the album's political and historical content, Neal compared aspects of Callahan's work to "Oliver Bullough... Pliny the Elder, Ctesias and Chaucer", and concluded that "English Primitive II is deeply satisfying on all levels. Most importantly, the music is inventive, atmospheric and exciting but with such a quality of lyric writing that the accompanying booklet with illustrations by David Janes would be worth purchasing in its own right. Throw in Pinkie Maclure's wonderful cover artwork and it completes a winning package."

Awarding English Primitive II "album of the month" in Ondarock in Italy, Stefano Santoni considered English Primitive II to be "a darker work than its predecessor without affecting David Lance Callahan's enormous talent as a storyteller" and "a noisier and more psychedelic record than its older sibling, but maintaining the same eclectic range of inputs." Santoni commented "although [Callahan] is constantly torn between the mystical and the concrete in his lyrical writing, his social outlook (in theory gloomy but optimistic), slips on the troubling current state of the UK (and the world) that seems to have returned to that ancient social order formed by a seemingly untouchable caste of the rich and powerful and a complete lack of freedom for anyone who works for a living... The second part of English Primitive does not disappoint in any way, showing an increasingly mature and multifaceted author capable of setting to music tales of real life and a vision of a British society in which the mechanisms of cultural assimilation and political system are not exactly well-oiled. The prevailing corruption, the intentional and unintentional brutality inflicted on the weakest and the sometimes perverse ways in which this happens are blunted with stark realism in eight extraordinary stories. An intricate and ghostly vision..."

In a review for Penny Black Music, Kimberley Bright noted that the record is "more a darker companion piece than a follow-up to its predecessor... This album is harder with threads of folk and psychedelia and far more unsettling subjects... the burning, vengeful rage of the ordinary man... corruption in government, taking as a metaphor the very real money laundering that takes place in the UK by international gangsters and oligarchs, while leaders, real estate developers, and quasi-philanthropists pretend not to notice. Politicians and complicit unelected government cogs are also skewered... "The Scapegoat", with its misleadingly cheerful post-punk guitar, comes close to being a Billy Bragg political satire. "The Burnet Rose" is a beautiful folk song on the surface, with more elegant vocals from Katherine Mountain Whitaker, but with a more sinister back story. This widespread, rangy, hardy breed of wildflower covers the graves of Yorkshire plague victims from the 1600s. Callahan's menacing drone over chilling strings is appropriate for the dire horror of "Bear Factory"... 'I'm a gap in the register and an empty desk, / but I really did exist.' These two songs highlight Callahan's ability, much like Lou Reed's, to relay horrible stories without even blinking."

In AudioReview No. 449, Federico Guglielmi wrote "what makes the disc special and therefore worthy of listening is its absolute quality, thanks to an inspiration totally free from constraints. What Callahan conceived with the help of a small circle of friends can be framed as folk rock with marked psychedelic accents, wrapped in shadows but pierced by flashes of light. It has an ancestral breath but does not give up on modern sounds, rests on graceful melodies but does not censor biting and noisy textures, evokes ecstatic yet tormented suggestions and, on a textual level, tells real events without disdaining departures on a tangent. It is a game of contrasts that do not degenerate into conflicts but, on the contrary, peacefully resolve themselves into pieces... rich in charm... It is unthinkable that a work like this could get more than cult feedback, but who cares? Surely not David Lance Callahan, who, not knowing (or willing?) to decide whether to be a songwriter, an experimenter, a rocker or a shaman, opted for a seductive, charismatic hybrid that encompasses all four roles, pulling a magnificent example out of his hat — a double magnificent example, because English Primitive II and its different twin English Primitive are two sides of the same coin — of spontaneous, passionate musical inventiveness, both emotional and intellectual. Those who have the courage to enter his world may never want to leave it." (As with Ondarock, Audio Review awarded English Primitive II "album of the month").

== Track listing ==
All tracks are written by David Lance Callahan.

No.	Title	Length
1.	"Invisible Man"	6:27
2.	"Beautiful Laundrette"	3:43
3.	"The Parrot"	4:01
4.	"The Scapegoat"	4:36
5.	"Bear Factory"	6:13
6.	"The Burnet Rose"	5:10
7.	"Orgy of the Ancients"	7:00
8.	"London by Blakelight"	4:33
Total length:		41:43

== Personnel ==
(Credits adapted from Bandcamp and Discogs.com entries plus album liner notes.)

- David Lance Callahan – vocals (all except 6), electric guitar, acoustic guitar (7), sampler (1,2,4,7,8)

with

- Kathleen Mountain Whitaker – vocals (1,2,7,8), lead vocals (6)
- Daren Garratt – drums (1,2,3,7)
- Rory Atwell – tambourine (2), digital synthesizer (8)
- Anja Büchele – Casio PT-82 & vocals (4)
- The Iskra Strings (John Smart, Emma Owens, Verity Simmons and James Underwood) – string quartet (5)
- Dan Fordham – string arrangement (5)

Production

- David Lance Callahan – production, recording, mixing
- Rory Attwell – recording, mixing

Artwork and design

- David Lance Callahan – cover concept
- Andy Royston (at Tropical Sundae) – art direction
- Pinkie Maclure – cover image
- David Janes – illustrations
