= Eva Luna (disambiguation) =

Eva Luna is a novel by Isabel Allende.

Eva Luna may also refer to:

- Eva Luna (album), a 1992 album by Moonshake
- Eva Luna (horse), an Irish racehorse
- Eva Luna (TV series), a 2010 telenovela
