= Frenett =

Frenett is a surname, not to be confused with Frenette.

Most Frenetts currently reside in either the United States or in Rushbrooke, in Ireland. A few of those from Rushbrooke have moved into homes in the London area and following this have moved to Woodley in Berkshire and East Yorkshire. There are no longer Frenetts left in Yorkshire, favouring Hertfordshire instead. However, there is a legacy of Frenett-Smithson in and around the Beverley area.

A few theories as to the 'birth' of the name currently exist. The first being that the name was changed from Frenette to Frenett when a family moved from the US/Canada to Ireland around the time of the Great Famine.

The second theory being that, as a name, it has existed for hundreds of years, never growing hugely, and moving in its totality from location to location. And a third that the e was dropped in order for a family member to hide their identity in Quebec.

The name Frenett is mentioned briefly in many US and occasionally a UK census, but the entries have never formed a distinct pattern, leaving the reader to wonder, which entries refer to the family name Frenett, and which are misspellings of the family name Frenette.

== See also ==
- John Frenett
