= David Lance Callahan =

English musician (born 1964)

- Born: David Lance Callahan; 18 March 1964 (age 62); Chelmsford, Essex, England
- Origin: Harold Wood, Essex, England
- Genres: rock; art rock; post-punk; garage rock; post-rock; experimental rock; psychedelic folk; experimental folk; dub; noise rock; noise pop; sampledelia
- Occupations: Musician; singer; songwriter; writer; naturalist; nature writer; record producer
- Instruments: Vocals; guitar; sampler; synthesizer; bass guitar
- Years active: 1985–present
- Labels: Tiny Global Productions, Slumberland Records, C/Z Records, World Domination Enterprises, Def American, Too Pure, Atlantic Records, Matador Records, Creation Records, Bertelsmann Music Group, Odd Box Records, Cherry Red Records, Midnight Music, The Pink Label, A Turntable Friend, Tip Top Recordings, Optic Nerve Recordings, Where It's at is Where You Are Records
- Member of: The Wolfhounds; Swell Maps C21
- Formerly of: Moonshake; The $urp!u$; The Changelings
- Website: David Callahan homepage

David Lance Callahan (also known as David Callahan) is an English musician, naturalist and writer. His music has been classified as rock, art rock, post-punk, garage rock, post-rock, experimental rock, psychedelic folk, experimental folk, dub, noise rock, noise pop, and sampledelia.

Callahan has been a singer, songwriter and instrumentalist with The Wolfhounds, Moonshake, The Changelings, and The $urp!u$. He is considered a significant figure in British alternative rock due to The Wolfhounds' contribution to the C86 cassette (regarded as a pivotal moment for independent music in the UK) and due to Moonshake's subsequent contribution to the development of British post-rock.

Callahan currently records and performs solo singer-songwriter work informed by folk, blues and experimental sound, describing himself as a "dissonant electric folk singer." He has also worked with Swell Maps C21, PJ Harvey, McCarthy, Stereolab, Manyfingers, and Silver Apples as musician, producer or collaborator.

As a naturalist and nature writer, Callahan has written three books and numerous magazine articles. Further books are planned on other subjects, including a study of the relationship between British popular musicians and the dole, and a novel expanding on the themes of his song "Foxboy".

== Biography ==
=== Early years and formative influences ===
David Callahan was born in Chelmsford, Essex, England in 1964 and grew up in another Essex town, Harold Wood. He recalls his hometown, at the time, as having been "pretty small-minded, occasionally sinister" with problems of sexism, violence and racism, commenting "if you were deemed to be a – this is in inverted commas – 'a poof'... if you showed any sign of sensitivity or intelligence, you were called that word and often had it hammered home to you with hands and feet." One of Callahan’s classmates at primary school was murdered as part of a gangland hit, and he has observed that the area was "the kind of Essex you read about with gangsters moving out there. There was definitely that undercurrent there... It was definitely a kind of black economy but quite well off on the edge of town. It's hard to describe really. I spent a lot of lyrics in songs trying to describe it. There were all these possibilities. All these engaging and stimulating, positively stimulating things and, also, quite a dark side to it... Jobs did not pay well, and you were kind of browbeaten. If you were clever, everyone thought you were trying to be better than them, so they hit you. If you weren't clever, then you had to try and keep in with people. People were very physical in their opinions at the time.

Callahan was consoled by Harold Wood's proximity to London and his ability to obtain "obscure and weird and engaging records and books and magazines... Outside my house, it was often a cultural dearth but inside my house, the local library and a few select shops in Romford, there was some colour, intellectual excitement and emotional excitement." As a child, he became a keen naturalist, becoming interested in birds and lizards: he had a menagerie at the age of eleven, including newts, a stoat, a bat, a moorhen and a slow worm.

Callahan became an active music fan in September 1977 at the age of twelve, attending concerts by Alternative TV, Patrik Fitzgerald, The Purple Hearts and assorted mod revival and post-punk acts at his local youth club. ("Once a month there would be these weird punk gigs going on. So that was a refuge if you like. Libraries, that, and we just used to sit over in the park with a cassette player, take speed and drink wine with like-minded school friends.") He would also listen to John Lydon's DJ slots on the radio, noting that "you were expecting him to play all the great punk stuff and what he did instead was play Can and Captain Beefheart and Tim Buckley and Doctor Alimantado. Just amazing stuff and mind-blowing things. It threw you back in time to the really interesting music that was being made when you were too little to hear it. It was that stuff that influenced me much more than punk ever did really... When the post-punk and indie thing happened, that was my thing. You could mix it all up as well. You could have Metal Box by PiL but also Postcard Records pop guitar stuff. You'd buy things on Rough Trade, and it wouldn’t just be Scritti Politti, there'd be James Blood Ulmer and jazz and stuff like this. It was like a melee of really good stuff from all over the show."

== Musical career, 1980s and 1990s ==
"I can't bear it when people accuse songs that are similar of plagiarism. Folk music evolved from people copying each other and getting it slightly wrong or adding their own thing to it. That's how pop music evolved too. The idea that you can bring a lawyer in and sue someone, because you've nicked a line or a bit of the tune and made the song your own and take that person’s money and divvy it up between lawyers. It all sounds stupid to me because it shows a complete misunderstanding of how music actually works. Most music has developed because someone has tried to copy someone else, and either wasn’t good enough to do it or got bored doing it and changed it into their own voice, or couldn't do it any other way but their own. That’s how music evolves. I was an early adopter of sampling because it's like a collage. That, for me, is a perfectly valid form of art. I was perfectly happy to sample people and muck it up, distort it and make it all sound weird. I'm perfectly happy for people to do that to me as well. It’s all part of the same flow."

— David Callahan

Callahan first performed onstage at the age of fifteen, having been asked to recite his own poetry over the music of a local punk band. Other musicians he met at around this time included Mike Herbage (later of Department S) and Terry Edwards. Leaving school shortly afterwards, he worked at various dead-end jobs and performed briefly with a few more short-lived local bands (such as The Changelings, which teamed him with Simon Stebbing and Bob Manton from The Purple Hearts plus guitarist Paul Clark).

=== The Wolfhounds (1985–1990) ===
In 1985, at the age of nineteen, Callahan co-founded a garage rock band, The Wolfhounds (initially with Clark, Andrew Golding, Andy Bolton and Frank Stebbing). The Wolfhounds came to broader attention due to their inclusion on the C86 compilation album, to which they contributed "Feeling So Strange Again".

With various line-up changes, The Wolfhounds spent the next few years rapidly developing into an experimental rock band and releasing four albums, Unseen Ripples from a Pebble, Bright and Guilty, Blown Away and Attitude. This work gained them plenty of critical attention but low sales, and the band split up in early 1990.

=== Moonshake and The $urp!u$ (1990–2000) ===
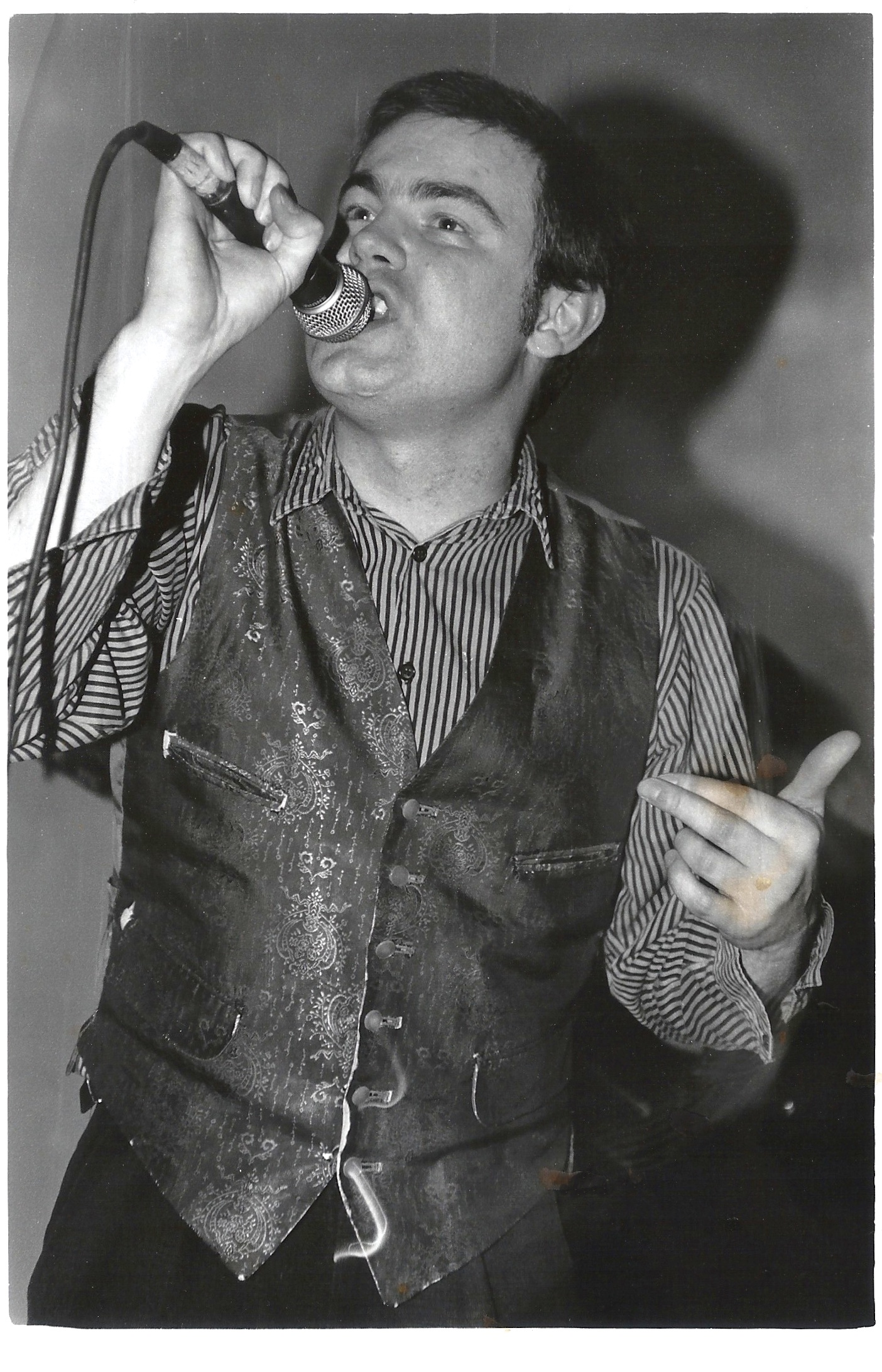
David Callahan with Moonshake, 1994

After the split of The Wolfhounds, Callahan formed the experimental rock band Moonshake with former Ultra Vivid Scene member Margaret Fiedler. Following a debut EP on Creation Records, the band signed to Too Pure and released two further EPs, touring the UK, France and America. Moonshake's debut album Eva Luna was well received and has maintained an enduring reputation as one of the key albums shaping British post-rock as well as redeveloping dub-based post-punk and incorporating hip hop production techniques.

Following the release and tour for the band's second album Big Good Angel, Moonshake split in half in 1994. Fiedler, bass player John Frenett and producer/engineer Guy Fixsen left to form Laika. Callahan continued Moonshake with saxophonist Ray Dickaty and various other musicians, continuing to play live (including a three-month tour of North America that included three weeks on the nomadic Lollapalooza Festival with Metallica, The Ramones and Wu Tang Clan, and co-headline tours with Codeine and New Kingdom) and recording two further albums, The Sound Your Eyes Can Follow and Dirty & Divine.

Following Moonshake's final split in 1997, Callahan briefly moved to New York before returning to London circa 1999 and forming The $urp!u$ with Anja Büchele (continuing Moonshake's sampler-driven avant-rock experiments on a smaller scale). The $urp!u$ recorded four songs, compiled onto the $$ EP, before Callahan quit band work in 2001 (although he would continue with occasional work as a DJ).

== Becoming a nature writer (2000–present) ==
"You get into music and suddenly you're into all the obscure stuff and you're trying to find rare records and hear songs that haven’t been released yet. It's the same thing with birding. You start to identify the most tricky-to-identify species and go to the most obscure ends of the earth. Birding's taken me to much weirder and way-out places than being in music ever did, and I've met way more interesting people as well."

— David Callahan

Now the father of two children, Callahan spent the early 2000s working in warehouse logistics (something which he described as "arty manual labour... sending film reels to festivals for a film company"). Having rediscovered his interest in nature, he began studying Biological Science on a night-school degree course at the University of London's Birkbeck College, as a mature student, as well as spending seven weeks in Madagascar on an ecological survey. Graduating as a Bachelor of Science, he subsequently went on to gain a master's degree in Taxonomy and Biodiversity at Imperial College (in collaboration with the Natural History Museum and the Zoological Society of London).

Callahan's writing career began when he approached Birdwatch magazine on spec, suggesting some topics for articles. His suggestions were taken up, and the first article which he wrote for the magazine made the front cover. Callahan then joined Birdwatch as a staff writer and remained there for ten years before going freelance.

Callahan has written for the UK publications Birdwatching and BBC Wildlife, and for international publications including BirdLife magazine. He has also written three popular ornithology books – A History of Birdwatching in 100 Objects, Where to Watch Birds in East Anglia: Cambridgeshire, Norfolk and Suffolk, and Where to Watch Birds in Southeast England: Essex, London and Kent.

== Musical career resumed ==
=== The Wolfhounds (2006–present) ===
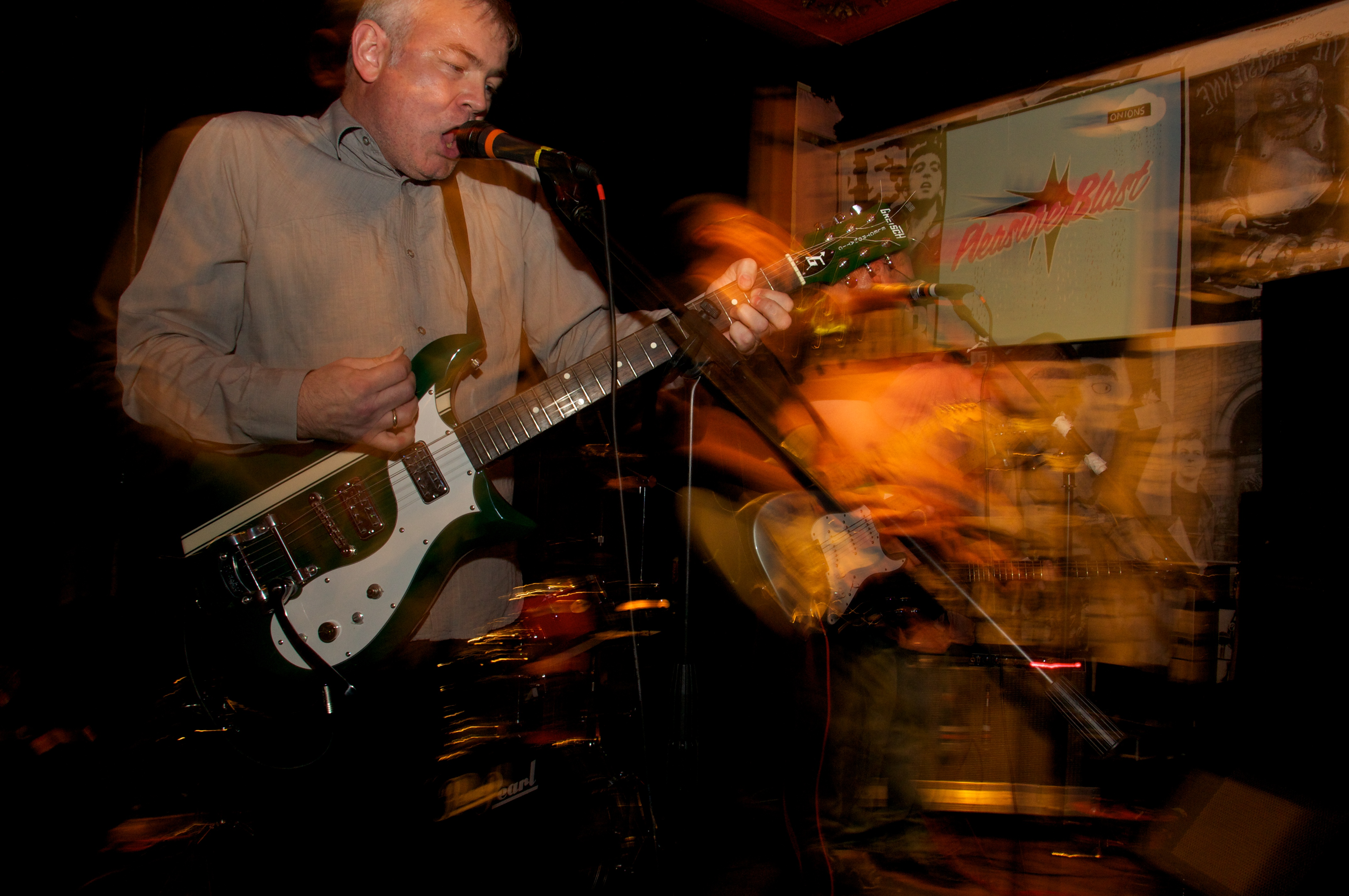
Callahan with a revived Wolfhounds, 2012

In 2006, Callahan resumed his musical career alongside his writing career. The Wolfhounds reformed in 2006 and have gone on to play regularly and to record three new albums, Middle Aged Freaks, Untied Kingdom (...Or How to Come to Terms with Your Culture) and Electric Music.

=== Solo work (2018–present) ===
In 2018, Callahan began a solo career – this time under his full name of David Lance Callahan – creating music for which he describes himself as a "dissonant electric folk singer." These recordings have seen Callahan producing more intimate work for voice and solo electric guitar, with some use of string quartet and sampler. There are also contributions from other musicians – regular Callahan horns collaborator Terry Edwards; former Pram/Nightingales/Fall drummer Daren Garratt; Alison Cotton (vocal/viola player with The Left Outsides and Eighteenth Day of May); Mel Draisey (violinist and vocalist with The Clientele and Le Volume Courbe); several Spanish students from the Berklee music school in Valencia; and singers Katherine Mountain Whitaker (Evans the Death) and Anja Büchele (Meuve, The $urplu$, Triple Negative).

"This is the thing: I tried to avoid being a musician. I had children, I had to get a job. But I'd got so much into the habit that I’d wake up in the middle of the night and have to write lyrics down, or I'd have to pick up a guitar. I'd suddenly find myself writing a new song. There's a comedian over here called Stewart Lee, who I know a little bit, and he said to me, 'Your art, basically, is a life sentence'..."

— David Callahan

Callahan began his solo career with two singles, "She Passes Through the Night" (2018) and "Strange Lovers" (2019). His first solo album, English Primitive I was released in October 2021 on Tiny Global Productions: a second, English Primitive II, followed in November 2022. A stand-alone single, "Evil Magnets/Free Radicals" was released in May 2023. Callahan's third album, Down to the Marshes (recorded in Valencia and London), was released in September 2024. Callahan promotes his solo music via gigs and tours on his own and as a two-piece with Daren Garratt.

Taking note of Callahan's "career of consistent brilliance and stark originality", the press release for English Primitive I commented that "Wolfhoundian riffage offered enough ramshackle charm to somewhat obscure Callahan's darker, more penetrating writing. Likewise, Moonshake's musically bi-polar approach disguised his underlying political impulse. Here Callahan's lyricism finally, indelibly, proves him to be among the finest British pop craftsmen. This is his masterwork, a mélange of what has been called 'mutant Eastern, West African, folk, blues and post-punk influences'... an improbable cross-cultural gumbo, yet one which coalesced into a swirling, kaleidoscopic psychedelia of emotion unlike any other record in this era."

== Other musical activities (past and present) ==
Callahan is a current member of Swell Maps C21 (a project to "rekindle the spirit" of experimental post-punk band Swell Maps, also featuring Jowe Head, John Cockrill, Gina Birch, Luke Haines, Terry Edwards, Lee McFadden, Joss Cope and Chlöe Herington), having played live with the band as well as contributing guitar and vocals to recent studio recordings. In the past, he has contributed synthesizer playing to the live line-up of Stereolab, production work to early McCarthy recordings, guested with experimental electronic pop project Manyfingers and remixed electronic rock pioneers Silver Apples.

== Discography ==
=== solo (as "David Lance Callahan") ===
==== (albums) ====
- English Primitive I (Tiny Global Productions, 2021)
- English Primitive II (Tiny Global Productions, 2022)
- Down to the Marshes (Tiny Global Productions, 2024)

==== (singles) ====
- "She Passes Through the Night" (Where It's at is Where You Are Records, 2018)
- "Strange Lovers" (Slumberland Records, 2019)
- "Free Radicals/Evil Magnets" (Tiny Global Productions, 2023)

=== with The Wolfhounds ===
(selected)

- Unseen Ripples from a Pebble (#6) (May 1987, Pink, PINKY19 [LP]; Nov 2014, Optic Nerve, OPT4.012 [LP & CD])
- The Essential Wolfhounds (November 1988, Midnight Music, CHIME0032S [LP]/COLIN1CD [CD])
- Bright and Guilty (February 1989, Midnight Music, CHIME048 [LP]/CHIME048C [C]/CHIME048CD [CD]; Aug 2022, Optic Nerve [2LP] – reissue w/extra tracks)
- Blown Away (October 1989, Midnight Music, CHIME057F [LP]/CHIME057C [C]/CHIME057CD [CD])
- Attitude (May 1990, Midnight Music, CHIME1.07 [LP]/CHIME1.07CC [C]/CHIME1.07CD [CD])
- Lost But Happy (1986–1990) (April 1996, Cherry Red, CDMRED126 [CD])
- Middle Aged Freaks (November 2014, Oddbox, BOX023 [CD])
- Untied Kingdom (...Or How to Come to Terms with Your Culture) (October 2016, Oddbox, [LP]; 2017, Optic Nerve [CD])
- Hands in the Till: The Complete John Peel Sessions (2018, A Turntable Friend, LP/CD)
- Electric Music (2020, A Turntable Friend [LP/CD])

=== with Moonshake ===
(selected)

- Eva Luna (1992, Too Pure / 1993, Matador / Atlantic)
- Big Good Angel (mini-album) (1993, Too Pure / Matador)
- The Sound Your Eyes Can Follow (1994, Too Pure / American)
- Dirty & Divine (1996, C/Z-BMG / World Domination)
- Remixes (1999, C/Z)

=== with The $urp!u$ ===
- $$EP EP (2001, Ada Records)

=== guest appearances ===
- McCarthy – Red Sleeping Beauty EP (1986, The Pink Label) – co-production on "Red Sleeping Beauty"
- McCarthy – That's All Very Well But... The Best of McCarthy (1996, Cherry Red Records) – co-production on "Red Sleeping Beauty"
- Silver Apples – Beacon Remixed (1998, Whirlybird Records) – remixer on "Borrowed Time (Together/Cosmic String)"
- Manyfingers – The Spectacular Nowhere (2015, Ici D’Ailleurs) – vocals & lyrics on "The Dump Pickers of Rainham", "70" and "From Madam Hilda Soarez"
- Swell Maps C21 – Polar Regions (2023, Glass Modern) – guitar on "HS Art", "Bronze and Baby Shoes", "Midget Submarines", "Cake Shop" and "Helicopter Spies"; vocals on "Read About Seymour" and "Let's Build a Car"

== Bibliography ==
=== Books ===
==== (as author) ====
- A History of Birdwatching in 100 Objects. Helm. 2014. ISBN 9781408186657.
- Where to Watch Birds in East Anglia: Cambridgeshire, Norfolk and Suffolk. Bloomsbury Wildlife. 2020. ISBN 9781472962218.
- Where to Watch Birds in Southeast England: Essex, London and Kent. Helm. 2024. ISBN 9781399403603.

==== (as contributor) ====
- True, Everett (2017). Electrical Storm: Grunge, My Part in Its Downfall. Rejected Unknown.
- Wyatt, Malcolm (2023). Wild! Wild! Wild! a People's History of Slade. Spenwood Books. ISBN 978-1-915858-07-8.

=== Articles (selected) ===
- Callahan, David (17 April 2018). "Viva Valencia birding!". Birdwatch.
- Callahan, David (8 January 2021). "Review of Horizon by Barry Lopez". Birdwatch.
- Callahan, David (23 May 2023). "Review of Hawksworth LP by Matt Espy". Birdwatch.
