= Down to the Marshes =

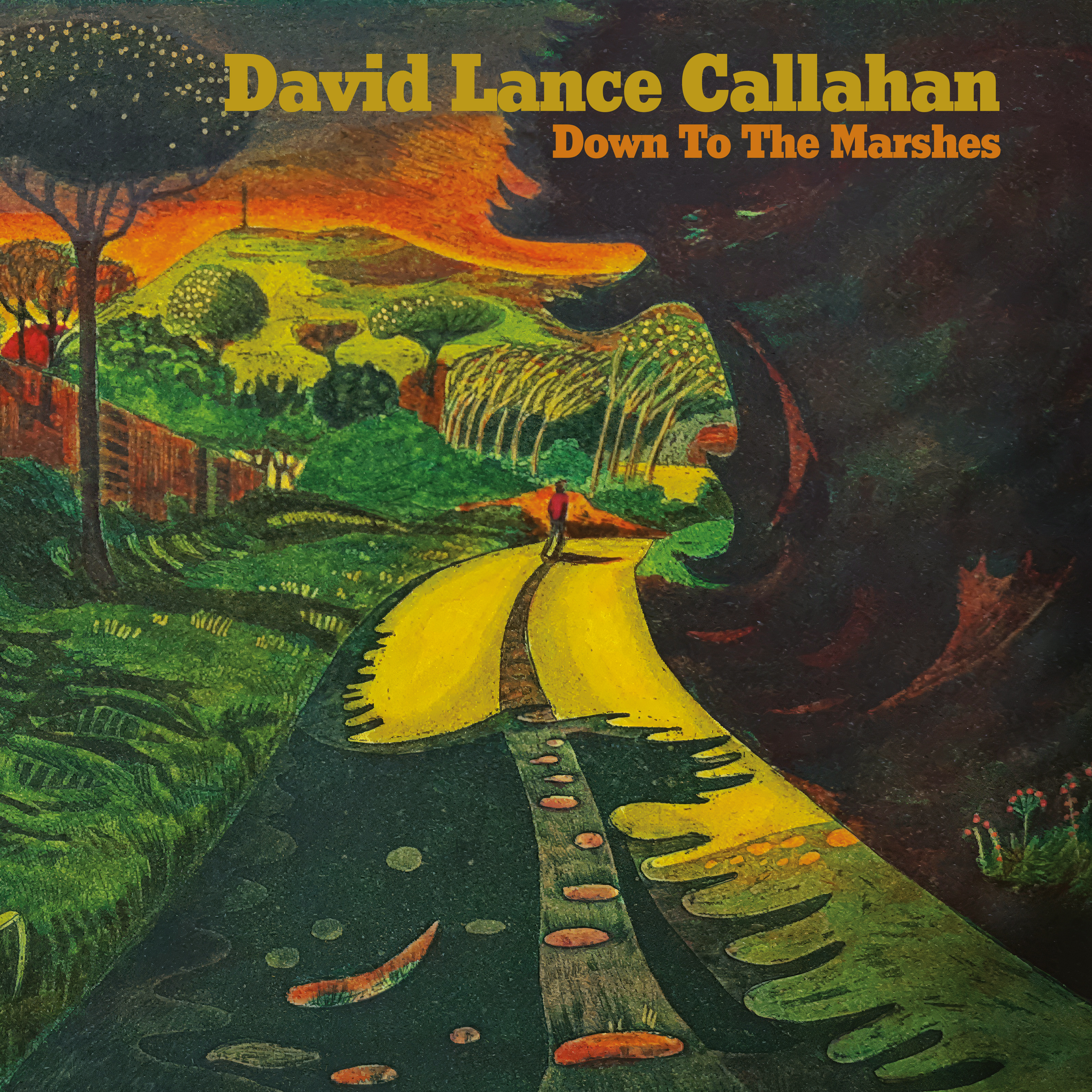

Studio album by David Lance Callahan
- Released: 27 September 2024
- Genres: Psychedelic folk; singer-songwriter; experimental rock
- Length: 44:04
- Label: Tiny Global Productions
- Producer: David Lance Callahan

David Lance Callahan chronology
English Primitive II (2022)	Down to the Marshes (2024)

Down to the Marshes is the third studio album by David Lance Callahan. It was released through Tiny Global Productions on 27 September 2024.

== Background and production ==
Described in the press release as being "somewhat brighter, almost optimistic" in comparison to its two predecessors, Down to the Marshes continues Callahan's exploration of "strands of vaguely arcane British Isles folk music [in which] the album's subjects, tone and references are almost entirely modern; the presence of Indian modalities, for example, seems to dutifully acknowledge the country's post-war multi-cultural make-up... modern music made with an eye to the future, whatever that may bring." Other musical components of the album include West African music, blues and post-punk.

An "appreciation" summary (provided elsewhere in the album presskit) describes Down to the Marshes as "a more worldly standalone album" as well as one composed of "fractured, detuned visions" in which Callahan "continu[es] to invent his own folklore that fully applies to the modern world, and his own folk music to accompany it... The songs are still imbued with the scenes and lives of historic and contemporary London, making magical realism out of cold, hard reality... [This is] an album that makes its own genres and rules, and that will haunt your days and nights."

Subject matter for the songs includes coupledom set against the challenges of inexorable ageing and "acknowledging that you can never really know anyone"; the potentially explosive Thames estuary shipwreck of the SS Richard Montgomery; and (in "Father Thames & Mother London") the "friction between the visitors and residents of a gothic capital who never quite get to know each other". Influences beside the musical ones include the writer/curator Rachel Lichtenstein; the author Hilary Mantel; and W.H Auden, whose poem about "the bureaucratic nightmare of stateless refugees turning darker with each turn of the political wheel" is adapted for the song "Refugee Blues".

Callahan's regular collaborator Daren Garratt (Pram/The Nightingales/The Fall) returned as drummer; and another longtime Callahan cohort, Terry Edwards, played horns on one track. Otherwise, Down to the Marshes features a new set of musicians. Mel Draisey (of The Clientele) performs backing vocals and violin, while Catherine Gerbrands (7-Headed Raven, various Jowe Head projects) played musical saw on one track. The majority of the music was recorded at Estudio Elefante in València, Spain, and made use of Spanish musicians: keyboard/bass player Cris Belda, singer Anna Ferrándiz, the horn section of David Cases and Manu Pardo; and a string quartet. Rory Atwell (Callahan's co-recorder/mixer on English Primitive II) returned to help with additional overdubs at the Studio with No Name in Homerton, London, as well as editing and mixing.

The cover design depicts "The Wanderer", an artwork by Kit Boyd.

== Release ==
Down to the Marshes was released by Tiny Global Productions on 27 September 2024. Callahan and Garrett promoted it with touring in the summer of 2024: this included a pre-launch performance at the last of the "Legends of Indie" concerts at the Lexington in London on 14 August (curated and compered by Stewart Lee, who described Callahan as "a post-punk Blind Joe Death, a John Fahey who rides the rails of Transport for London, with looped lone guitar in hand, in search of the dark heart of Brexit Britain.")

The track "Robin Reliant" (compared both to Callahan's former band Moonshake and to William Blake) was released via Bandcamp on 12 July 2024 to promote the album. A second track, "The Spirit World", was released on 13 August 2024.

== Critical reception ==
Professional ratings
Review scores
Source	Rating
Mojo	3/5 stars
Record Collector	4/5 stars
Silent Radio	(excellent)
Blow Up	8.4/10 stars
Ondarock	8.2/10 stars
Stereo Embers	(excellent)

Writing in Mojo, Kieron Tyler described the album as "a multi-layered rumination which takes a while to beguile," and noting that "the past echoes through the present [and] Down to the Marshes explores this psycho-temporal terrain... Tuareg-style blues, dives into raga-esque extemporisation and English folk-informed balladry are seamlessly woven together. 'Refugee Blues' uses WH Auden's writing on stateless refugees to show that today's headline issue is nothing new. Album opener 'The Spirit World' finds 'the air of the dead' suffusing those with a yen for good old Fahrenheit rather than that pesky import Centigrade. It ends with 'Island State', where the key phrase 'I'll go it alone' butts up against recognising the impossibility of doing so. Fittingly, recording was completed in València, underscoring the notion of the Essex-born Callahan as an outsider considering post-Brexit Britain."

Defining Down to the Marshes as "a late-career high" in Record Collector, Johnnie Johnstone noted that "despite Callahan's unflinching socio-political commentary (best exemplified on 'Refugee Blues') and bittersweet nostalgia-drenched lyrics ('Robin Reliant') there's an optimistic air to the album. 'The Spirit World' is a fantastic opener with graceful brass and violin, and the title track boasts marvellous avant-folk guitars..."

Writing in Silent Radio, Andrew Neal hailed Down to the Marshes as "an absolute delight.. [stirring] together arcane folk, Indian modalities and complex post-Beefheart blues with pop melodicism to create an intoxicating brew. Callahan remains one of the sharpest contemporary lyricists providing a distinctive slant on politics, character sketches and nature. He has set himself a high bar but this is certainly among his finest work."

Noting that "Callahan does not entirely renounce the tones of someone who can and will 'address the nation'" (and praising his work as arranger as well as performer), Beppe Recchia of Blow Up comments that "variety [is] the album's trump card, and if 'Father Thames and Mother London' rolls a creeping melody between hypnotic guitar riff and controlled Hammond bursts, 'Robin Reliant' rivals Bob Mould's best for its immediate and robust pop-rock but stands out for its astute use of strings and piano; and 'Island State' closes with a chorus of ghostly voices and a guitar filled with Durutti Column reverb... Down to the Marshes is not only David Lance Callahan’s best solo work, but ranks among the peaks of his almost forty year-long career."

In Ondarock, Stefano Santoni concluded that "it was not easy at all to keep up the excellent standards of his first two solo works, but with Down to the Marshes David Lance Callahan confirms himself not only as a cult hero but also as an artist capable of mixing psychedelia, folk, Indian suggestions and melodic openings in an absolutely personal way, also confirming himself as one of the sharpest contemporary lyricists, able to write in an ingenious and never conventional way about British and world politics, perfectly managing to describe not only the nature around us, but also some of the characters and corporations of current social life with black humour and sarcasm." Santoni had particular praise for "Father Thames and Mother London", which "bitterly photographs a capital city where visitors are 'queueing gawpers who pay for a cartoon bloody dungeon' and residents don’t really even know who lives next to them," and for "the stunning 'Robin Reliant', which, returning to [Callahan's] second great passion, birdwatching, shows us the talent and state of grace of one of the UK’s most personal and creative artists, capable of creating his own genre with his own rules, moving from his love for sampling and the Krautrock influences of his former band Moonshake to the development of a new English folk."

Writing from a slightly more avant-garde perspective, Wilder Gonzales Agreda of the Peruvian Avant Garde blog described the record as "a re-birth within more acoustic and folk sounds, in a magical realism mode, than those that won [Callaghan] post-rock fame. There we can feel a certain indie post-punk affiliation of They Might Be Giants – 'Down to the Marshes', 'Robin Reliant' – and even the throbbing of Tony Conrad and La Monte Young in "The Montgomery", an enigmatic piece in which guitars, keyboards and brief distortions create a precise porridge for Callahan's statements, a bard lost in the accelerationism of the present days... This is a record that certainly requires multiple listens to understand and appreciate its imprint. And with each listen to Down to the Marshes the album, will grow and blossom in your psyche without you even noticing. Despite the hubbub that seems to overflow its forty-four minutes, my favourite on the album is 'Island State', a beauty of ethereal arpeggios where you can curl up and fly. Don't ever land..."

Praising in particular the "deft unfurlingness" and "craft[y] momentum" of "Kiss Chase", the "tricky-yet-hypnotic" feel of "Father Thames and Mother London", the "moodily acerbic, jagged and evocative" atmosphere of "The Montgomery" and the "wistful and forthright" "Island State", Dave Cantrell of Stereo Embers wrote of the album that "one senses the artist's cynicism warming in the sun... Down to the Marshes, in its essence, resonates at its deepest core with the buzz of this brief, often confounding but always curious existence we're blessed with no matter our birthplace or background, echoing throughout with the desires, the drive, the desperate love, all the mess that makes us us, defining along its way the tricky cadence of the human soul. And? It rocks, full out. Trust us, you want this one."

Down to the Marshes was voted No. 78 in the "Top 110 Album of 2024" chart in Louder Than War, with compiler Nathan Whittle stating "in this series of sonic snapshots, [Callahan] sketches the now with a series of compelling postcards from England in a song cycle that combines acoustic workouts, arcane folk, desert blues and lysergic acoustic pop in a melodic and enticing whole. This is music that goes beyond the underground and these songs are the soundtrack to the now, national treasure stuff that needs to be heard."

== Track listing ==
All tracks written by David Lance Callahan, except "Refugee Blues" (words by WH Auden, music written and arranged by David Lance Callahan).

No.	Title	Length
1.	"The Spirit World"	4:57
2.	"Down to the Marshes"	5:21
3.	"Refugee Blues"	6:30
4.	"Kiss Chase"	5:42
5.	"The Montgomery"	5:29
6.	"Father Thames and Mother London"	5:06
7.	"Robin Reliant"	5:39
8.	"Island State"	5:20
Total length:		44:04

== Personnel ==
(Credits adapted from album liner notes.)

- David Lance Callahan – vocals, electric & acoustic guitars, handclaps & fingerpops (7)

with

- Daren Garratt – drums & percussion, xylophone (3)
- Mel Draisey – backing vocals (1,2,7), violin (1)
- Terry Edwards – Sally Army horns (1)
- Catherine Gerbrands – musical saw (1)
- Cris Belda – Hammond organ bass pedals (2,4), piano (2,6,7), electric bass (3), Hammond organ (6,7)
- Mel Draisey – backing vocals (2,7)
- Raquel Campos – violin (2,4)
- Emiliano Pérez – violin (2,4)
- Sara López – viola (2,4)
- Samuel C Ledesma – cello (2,4)
- Anna Ferrándiz – exotic siren singing (5,8)
- David Cases – tenor saxophone (6,7)
- Manu Pardo – trumpet (6,7)

Production

- David Lance Callahan – editing, mixing
- Alberto Díaz – engineering
- Lluis Enguix – engineering
- Jorge Bernabé – engineering
- Rory Attwell – additional overdub engineering, editing, mixing

Artwork and design

- David Lance Callahan – cover concept
- Kit Boyd – cover image
