= Frenette =

Frenette is a surname, not to be confused with Frenett. Notable people with the surname include:

- Christiane Frenette (born 1954), Quebec educator and writer
- Derek Frenette (born 1971), Canadian professional ice hockey left winger
- Jean-Louis Frenette (1920–2008), Social Credit party member of the Canadian House of Commons
- Jocelyn Frenette (born 1976), former Canadian football Long snapper
- Kamylle Frenette (born 1996), Canadian paratriathlete
- Orville Frenette (1927–2024), Canadian judge
- Peter Frenette (born 1992), American ski jumper
- Ray Frenette (1935–2018), Canadian politician in New Brunswick
