= Hungover You =

Hungover You may refer to:

- "Hungover You", a song by Blink-182 from Nine (2019)
- "Hungover You", a song by Tokio Hotel from 2001 (2022)
