= The Wolfhounds =

English band

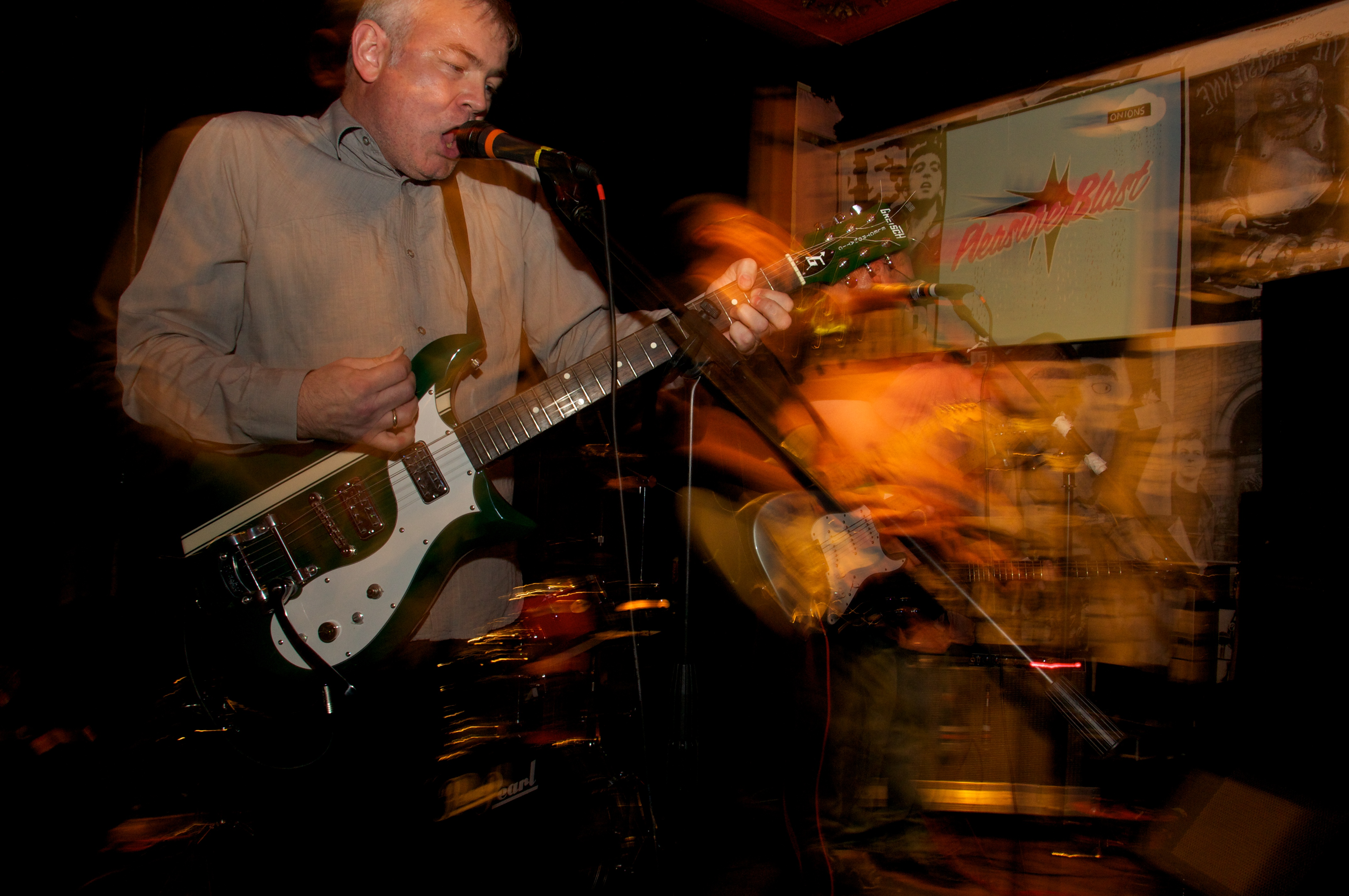
- The Wolfhounds (2012)

Background information
- Origin: Romford, Greater London, England
- Genres: Indie pop, noise pop, indie rock
- Years active: 1985–1990, 2005–present
- Labels: The Pink Label, Idea Records, September Records, Midnight Music, Vollwert-Records, Odd Box Records, Manic Pop!, Optic Nerve
- Members: David Callahan; Andy Golding; Richard Golding; Peter Wilkins
- Past members: Andy Bolton; Paul Clark; Matt Deighton; David Oliver; Frank Stebbing
- Website: www.facebook.com/TheWolfhounds thewolfhounds.bandcamp.com

The Wolfhounds are an English noise pop band formed in Romford, Greater London, in 1985 by David Callahan, Paul Clark, Andy Golding, Andy Bolton and Frank Stebbing, and originally active until 1990. The band reformed in 2005 and continues to write, record and play live, releasing new albums in 2014, 2016, and 2020.

== History ==
The Wolfhounds began as a slightly askew indie pop/rock band: David Callahan would later describe them as "pretty much a garage band but with a post-punk influence - more like The Fall crossed with The Stooges, with a bit of The Seeds thrown in." Collectively, they'd begun at an early age. Callahan: "We would turn up to gigs and it would feel like everyone there was ten years older than us. Even our first reviews in the music papers were describing us as little kids. We were eighteen. The Kinks were seventeen when they started having hits, but this wasn't what people were used to any more. They were used to people in their twenties and thirties. We were no-hopers who'd just left school and were working in warehouses and shops." Alongside Stebbing’s brother Simon and Bob Manton (both from The Purple Hearts), Clark and Callahan had previously played together in The Changelings, also known as "The Change Lings", who mostly performed classic garage band covers from the Nuggets and Pebbles compilation classics: the band received a single photo review in Sounds and placed one song, recorded on a cassette player, on Hit Records' Garage Goodies Vol. 1 compilation.)

The Wolfhounds signed to the Pink label in 1986. Their first EP Cut the Cake was well enough received for the NME to include them on their C86 compilation album, to which they contributed "Feeling So Strange Again".

In 2022, Callahan recalled "it didn't occur to us to actually record something properly or do our best song. We figured we'd never record "Feeling So Strange Again" otherwise as it wasn't one of our best songs. We'll just throw it away on a tape. Who's interested in a tape?... We already had "The Anti-Midas Touch" and "Me" potentially big singles if we'd had the money behind us. But we were dumb-asses... In the six or so hours we had to record that afternoon, we could have done ("The Anti-Midas Touch") really well and it would have been on a tape that ended up selling tens of thousands." In spite of this, the band saw an abrupt and substantial spike in the number of people coming to their shows, and went on to play the C86 gig at the ICA, at which they went down very well.

After two more singles and a debut album, Unseen Ripples from a Pebble, on Pink, they briefly moved to Idea Records for the Me single, then rejoined Pink's boss at his new label September Records. September soon evolved into Midnight Music which was the Wolfhounds' home for all subsequent releases.

Callahan has commented "as soon as we got attention, there was some panic in the band, with a couple of members thinking that we needed to be more commercial. It seemed ridiculous to me - we didn't have the chops for that. But we were a democracy, so that's how it went for a while."

With original members Bolton and Clark replaced by David Oliver and Matt Deighton, the Wolfhounds' sound developed into a denser, less poppy sound. After a compilation of earlier material, second album proper Bright and Guilty was released in 1989, featuring the singles "Son of Nothing", "Rent Act" and "Happy Shopper". The sound progressed further with the albums Blown Away (also 1989) and Attitude (1990), which found them in Sonic Youth territory, interspersing raging guitars with elegant compositional exercises. This proved to be the final Wolfhounds release of the 80s, with the band splitting in early 1990.

Callahan has commented "we put out three really good albums in the space of fifteen months that sounded like no-one else, and we even started to look good, but no-one gave a shit... People would say "if this band was from Boston, they'd be massive" and this kind of thing, but no-one was paying attention... We'd been through four labels in five years and it just wasn't happening. We weren't getting any more chances. We'd reached rock bottom. There was no way out."

Golding and Stebbing formed Crawl, while Callahan joined forces with former Ultra Vivid Scene member Margaret Fiedler in Moonshake. Matt Deighton formed Mother Earth.

== Reformation ==
Over the years, Callahan had received offers to perform with or be interviewed about The Wolfhounds, but by that time had established himself as a freelance ornithologist and had no interest in revisiting his musical past. However, he was finally convinced into reforming The Wolfhounds in 2006 for a gig organised by Bob Stanley of Saint Etienne to play at the ICA in London, alongside Roddy Frame and Phil Wilson, to celebrate the 20th Anniversary of the C86 cassette.

Callahan: "We started playing together and it actually worked. I won't say it was like the old days. It was better... it seemed like something we should continue with because it felt like a creative enterprise immediately." This event proved to be a turnaround in Callahan's attitudes: "I said yes, and it had worked. So I made a decision to say yes to everything, regardless of whether I had the time or not. And I've done that ever since."

With an ongoing line-up of David Callahan (guitar/vocals), Andy Golding (guitar/vocals), Peter Wilkins (drums) and Richard Golding (bass), the reunited Wolfhounds have continued to play live, having been further re-energised when The Membranes asked them to be special guests at The Lexington in London. In March 2012 they played with Laetitia Sadier from Stereolab in support at a benefit to raise funds for the Timperley Frank Sidebottom memorial statue.

An EP called EP001 was released on Vollwert-Records Berlin in April 2012 containing three songs that pre-date the band's first single but that were never recorded satisfactorily at the time. Of these songs, 'Skullface' has picked up a lot of radio play.

The band released several 7" singles in 2013, compiled with the previous EP on Middle Age Freaks, released by Odd Box Records in 2014. Also in 2014 an anniversary limited-edition issue of Unseen Ripples from a Pebble (plus bonus tracks) was released by Optic Nerve Recordings.

In October 2016, the Wolfhounds released their fifth album proper, Untied Kingdom (...Or How to Come to Terms with Your Culture). Louder Than War rated it 9/10. Sixth album Electric Music followed in 2020, which the same magazine declared was "arguably their best" so far.

The Wolfhounds' ongoing ethos is to play as a current creative act rather than an exercise in indie nostalgia. Callahan: "We do occasionally throw an old song into the set, like "The Anti-Midas Touch", but rather like a band like The Nightingales, we go around playing songs from our latest LP... That's what it's always been like for us. I was always inspired by the attitude of The Fall, where you'd go to see them promoting Dragnet but they'd already be playing Grotesque. Or Wire would play 154 when Chairs Missing had only just come out. I'm not ashamed of what I've done in the past, and I'll reflect on it and incorporate bits of it. But I'm always looking forward. I want to die with lots of unfinished work sitting there, waiting to be dealt with."

== Solo ==
Callahan, as David Lance Callahan, released a solo single "Strange Lovers" in 2019, followed by the album English Primitive I in 2021. Andy Golding, as Dragon Welding, released an eponymous LP in 2019, and second album Lights Behind The Eyes in 2021.

== Discography ==
Chart placings shown are from the UK Indie Chart.

=== Albums ===
- Unseen Ripples from a Pebble (No. 6) (May 1987, Pink, PINKY19 [LP]; Nov 2014, Optic Nerve, OPT4.012 [LP & CD])
- Bright and Guilty (February 1989, Midnight Music, CHIME048 [LP]/CHIME048C [C]/CHIME048CD [CD]; August 2022, Optic Nerve [2LP] - reissue w/extra tracks)
- Blown Away (October 1989, Midnight Music, CHIME057F [LP]/CHIME057C [C]/CHIME057CD [CD])
- Attitude (May 1990, Midnight Music, CHIME1.07 [LP]/CHIME1.07CC [C]/CHIME1.07CD [CD])
- Untied Kingdom (…Or How to Come to Terms with Your Culture) (October 2016, Oddbox, [LP]; 2017, Optic Nerve [CD])
- Electric Music (2020, A Turntable Friend [LP/CD])

=== Live albums ===
- My Life as a Young Idiot (Hammersmith 1985) (DL, 2015)
- Blazing White Bleached Crack in the Top (Brixton 1986) (DL, 2015)
- Noise-pop aus UK (Netherlands 1987) (DL, 2015)
- I Miss the Electric Mistress (Brighton 1989) (DL, 2015)

=== Compilations ===
- The Essential Wolfhounds (November 1988, Midnight Music, CHIME0032S [LP]/COLIN1CD [CD])
- Lost But Happy (1986-1990) (April 1996, Cherry Red, CDMRED126 [CD])
- Middle Aged Freaks (November 2014, Oddbox, BOX023 [CD])
- Hands in the Till: The Complete John Peel Sessions (2018, A Turntable Friend, LP/CD)

=== Singles/EPs ===
- "Cut the Cake" (March 1986, Pink, PINKY8 [12"]) (No. 19)
- "The Anti-Midas Touch" (September 1986, Pink, PINKY14 [7"]/PINKY14T [12"]) (No. 6)
- "Rats on a Raft"/(b/w Razorcuts track) (1986, The Legend!, Leg100 [7" flexi])
- "Cruelty" (April 1987, Pink, PINKY18 [7"]/PINKY18T [12"]) (No. 15)
- "Me" (November 1987, Idea, IDEA10 [7"]/ISEACI10 [CS]/IDEAT10 [12"]) (No. 18)
- "Son of Nothing" (May 1988, September, SEPT07T [12"])
- "Rent Act" (November 1988, Midnight Music, DONG043 [12"])
- "Happy Shopper" (March 1989, Midnight Music, DING046 [7"]/DONG046 [12"])
- EP001 ["Skullface"/"Rats on a Raft"/"6000 Acres"] (April 2012, Vollwert-Records, Berlin, EP001 [CD])
- "Cheer Up"/"Security"/"The Devil Looks After Her Own" (January 2013, Odd Box, ODD038 [7"])
- "Cheer Up"/"Skullface" (May 2013, Manic Pop!, manicpop020 [7"])
- "Divide and Fall"/"The Ten Commandments of Public Life" (2013, Oddbox, ODD055 [7"])
- "Anthem"/"Middle-Aged Freak" (2013, Oddbox, ODD056 [7"])
