= The Hangovers (band) =

- Origin: United Kingdom
- Genres: Alternative rock
- Years active: 1997–1998
- Labels: Rough Trade, Smoke, Kill Rock Stars
- Past members: Gina Birch; Simon Fisher Turner; Ida Akesson; Phil Legg; John Frenett; Joe Dilworth

The Hangovers were a band formed by The Raincoats member, Gina Birch, along with former members of Voodoo Queens, Stereolab and Laika.

== History ==
As well as Birch the band also featured actor/composer Simon Fisher Turner (guitar, keyboards), Ida Akesson (keyboards, sampling), Phil Legg (keyboards), Laika member John Frenett (bass), Mary Deigan (bass), and former Th' Faith Healers and Stereolab member Joe Dilworth (drums).

The band's debut single, "Soho", was one of the first releases on the re-established Rough Trade Records in 1997.

Their debut album, Slow Dirty Tears, was released on Smoke Records and in the United States early in 1998 on the Kill Rock Stars label. It received a four star rating from Allmusic. A departure from Birch's previous work with The Raincoats, Charles Taylor of the Providence Phoenix described the album as containing "samples, keyboard twiddling, weird noises throughout, and a dark, echoey feel", and Peter Margasak of the Chicago Reader noted Birch's "relentlessly bleak" lyrics. Tom Lanham of CMJ New Music Monthly described the album as "some of the most mold-breaking alterna-pop around". Andy Gill of The Independent called the album "utterly beguiling", commenting on Birch's "cartoonish inflection that paradoxically carries more humanity than most singers' desperate attempts at evoking 'soul'".

The band played in the US with Sleater Kinney and in Canada with Christian D.

== Discography ==
=== Albums ===
- Slow Dirty Tears (1998), Smoke/Kill Rock Stars

=== Singles ===
- "Soho" (1997), Rough Trade
- "Duck Nonsense" (1998), Smoke
- Mailorder Freak 7" Singles Club May 1998: "Sitting On Top Of The World"/"We Had A Really Smashing Time" (1998), Kill Rock Stars
