= Hangover (sculpture) =

1991 art installation in Hanover, Germany

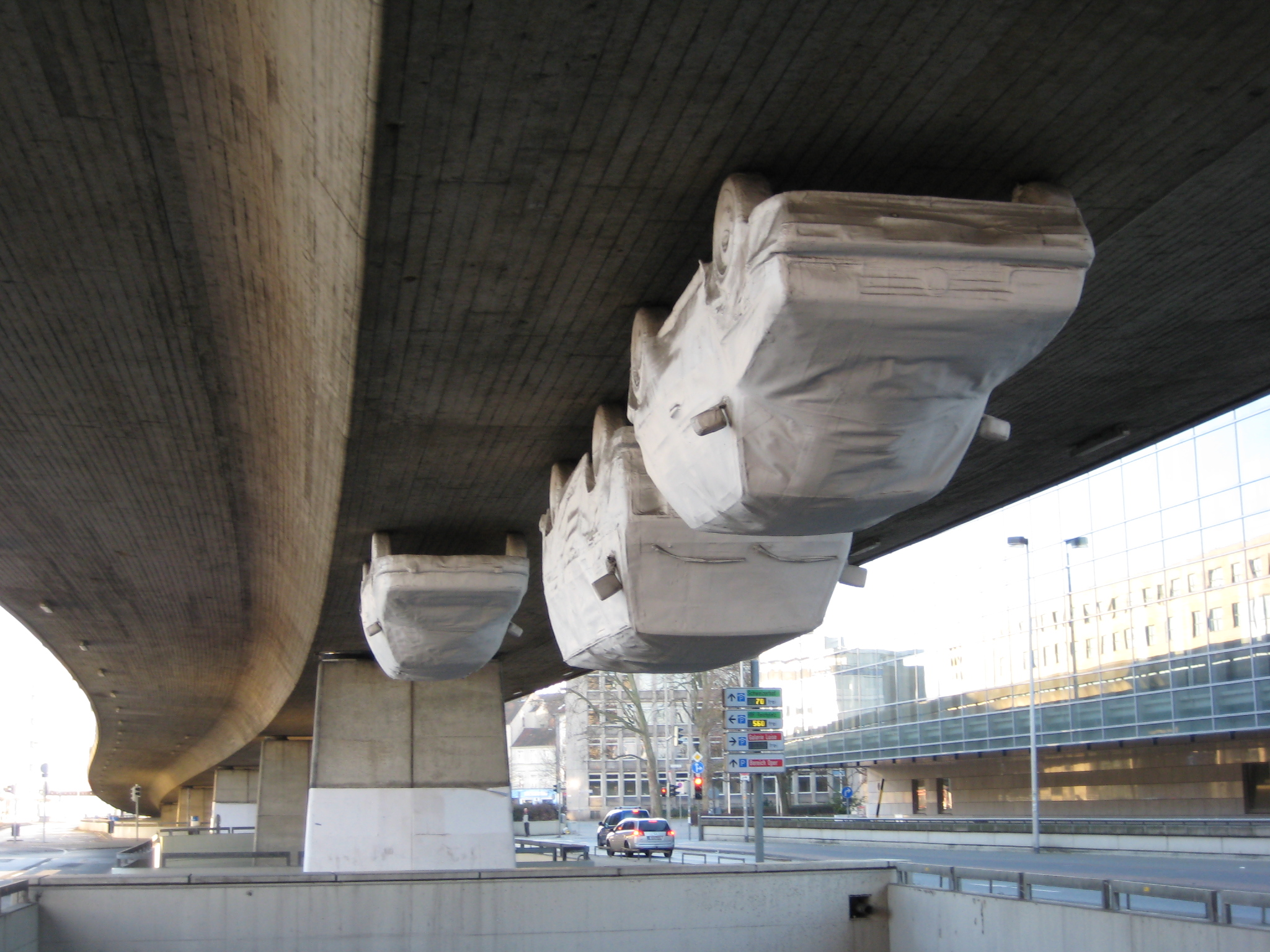
- The installation in 2008.
- Artist: Andreas von Weizsäcker
- Completion date: 1991
- Medium: polyester, aluminium, paper
- Subject: Volkswagen Type 2 T3; Volkswagen Golf Mk2; Volkswagen Passat B5
- Location: Hanover, Germany; 52°22′44.92″N 09°44′38.93″E

Hangover is an art inspiration in Hanover, Germany, made by Andreas von Weizsäcker. It consists of three sculptures of Volkswagen cars made from polyester, aluminium, and paper, and hang upside-down beneath the Rasch Square Overpass, at the Rasch Square, within the district of Mitte. The installation was first temporary unveiled in 1991, and subsequently removed, before being permanently reinstalled in 1993.

== History ==
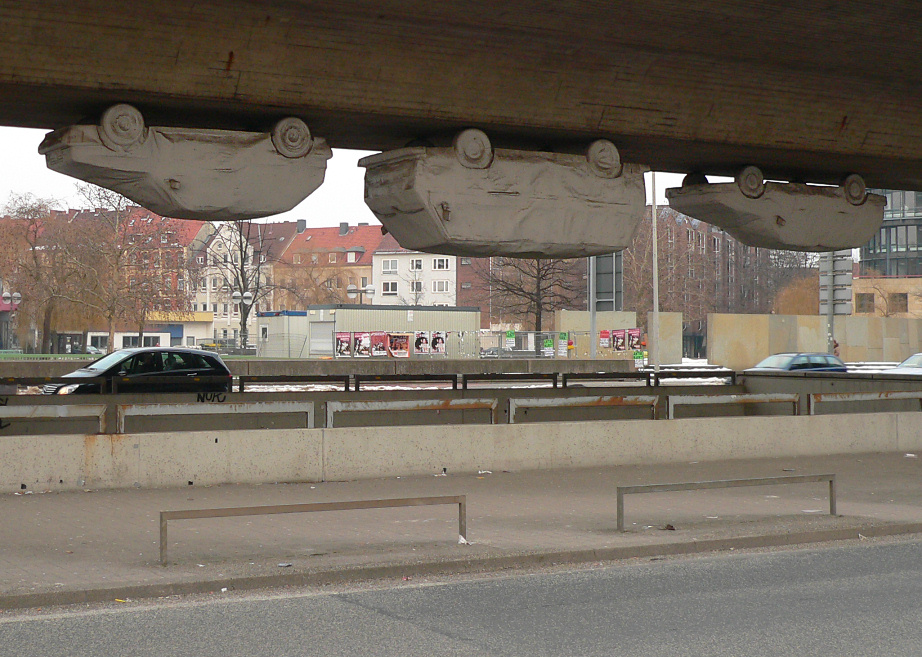
The art installation as seen from the side.

The art installation was made by sculptor Andreas von Weizsäcker and hung beneath the Raschplatz Overpass, as part of the In the Noise of the City sculpture program, organised by the Sprengel Museum. At the end of the project, it was dismantled and later reinstalled permanently in 1993, at the request of the local community.

== Design ==
The install consists of three sculptures of Volkswagen cars, made from polyester, aluminium, and paper, and hang upside-down by their tyres, beneth the Rasch Square Overpass, at the Rasch Square. They are depicted as Type 2 T3 van, Golf Mk2 hatchback, and Passat B5 estate wagon.
