= Pinkie Maclure =

Scottish stained glass artist and musician

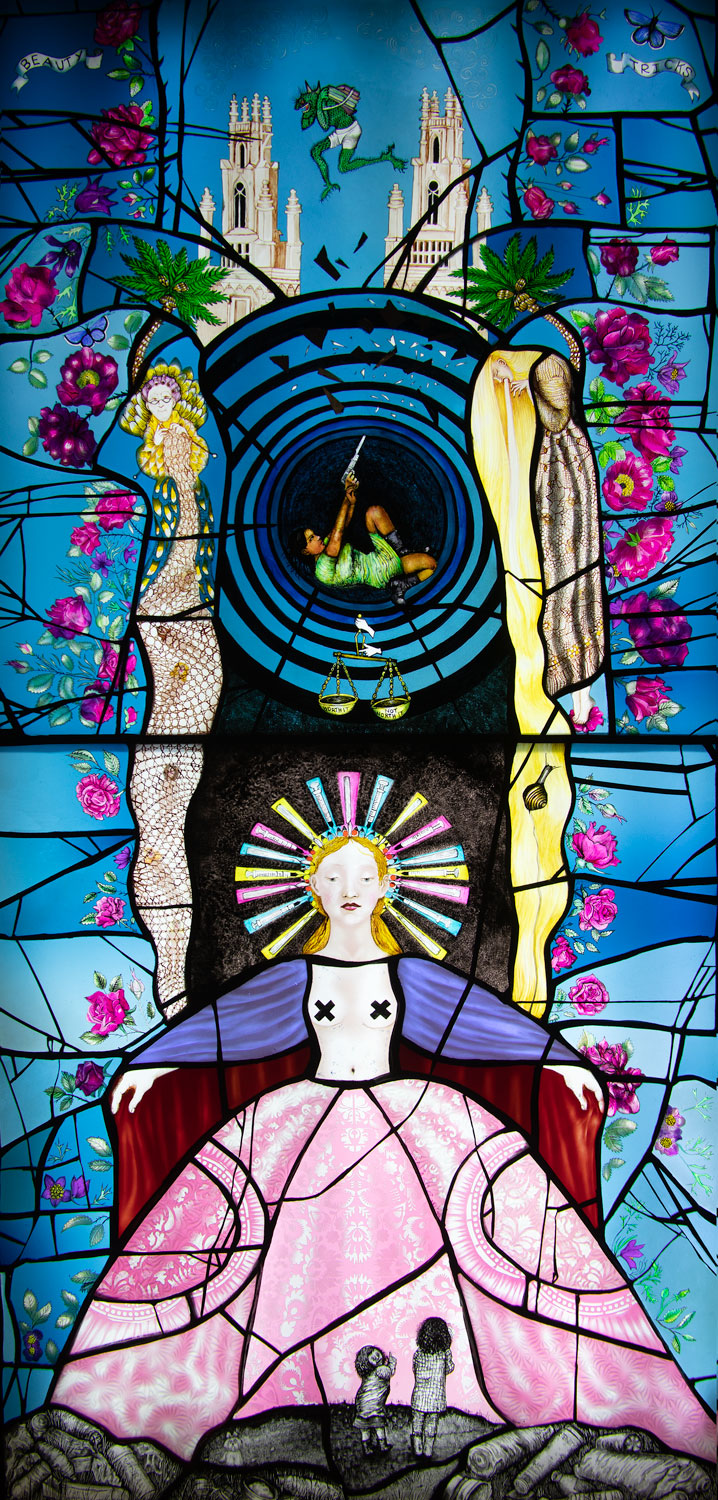
Beauty Tricks by Pinkie Maclure, Stained Glass 120cm x 60cm

Pinkie Maclure (born 1966) is a Scottish stained glass artist and musician. Her work has been purchased by the National Museum of Scotland and The Stained Glass Museum, Ely.

== Biography ==
Maclure grew up in rural Scotland, taking up stained glass later in life. She initially worked with her partner to restore and conserve historic stained glass, and later began creating her own work.

Maclure's lightboxes are recognisable for both their technical experimentation and their mix of personal, social and environmental storytelling. Critics note that her work moves stained glass away from a decorative approach and back towards its medieval story telling roots.

In 2020 the National Museum of Scotland purchased her piece ‘Self-portrait Dreaming of Portavadie.’ In 2021 Maclure's work 'Green Man Searches for Wilderness' was selected to appear in 'England on Fire: a visual journey through Albion's psychic landscape' a book and accompanying exhibition by Stephen Ellcock.

Maclure is also singer and songwriter with the band PumaJaw.
