= Moonshake =

British experimental rock/post-rock band

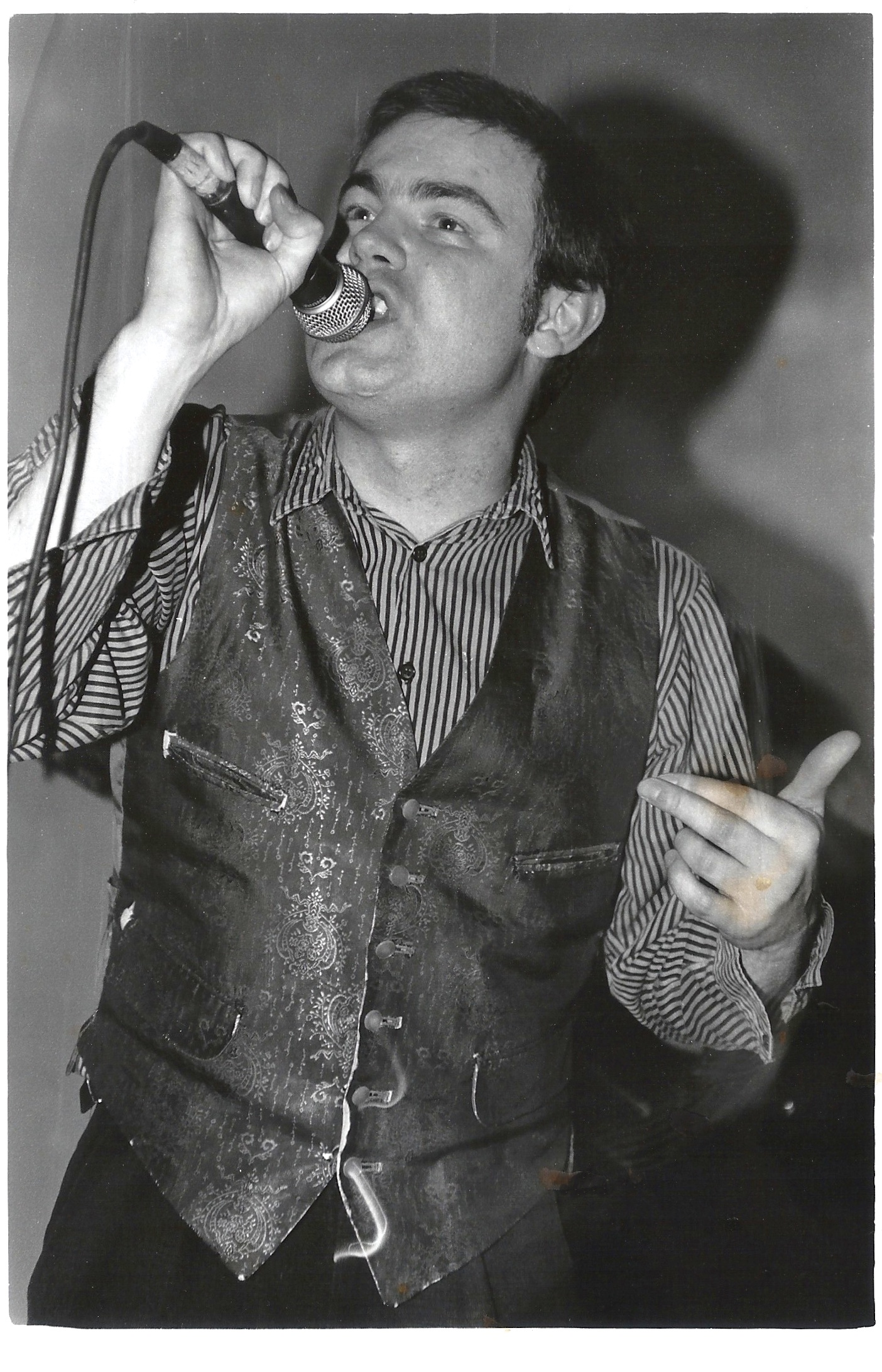
- David Callahan of Moonshake in 1994

Background information
- Genres: Post-rock, experimental rock
- Years active: 1991–1997
- Labels: Creation, C/Z, Too Pure
- Past members: David Callahan; Margaret Fiedler; John Frenett; Miguel "Mig" Morland; Raymond Dickaty; Matt Brewer; Kevin Bass; Katharine Gifford; Michael Rother

Moonshake were a British-based experimental rock band, existing between 1991 and 1997. The only consistent member was singer, sampler player and occasional guitarist David Callahan, who initially co-led the project with Margaret Fiedler. Fiedler and bass player John Frenett left Moonshake in 1993 to form the more commercially successful Laika.

The band was notable for its extensive use of textures and sampler technology in a rock context. In his 1996 article on Krautrock and its influences, Simon Reynolds described Moonshake as being among the "post-rock groove collectives".

== History ==
=== Formation (1991) ===
David Callahan (vocals, guitars, samplers) had been in indie rock band The Wolfhounds, who were active for much of the second half of the 1980s. Often associated with the C86 indie scene of the time, the band released several acclaimed albums of abrasive guitar pop and a dozen or so singles on a variety of labels. Following the band's split in early 1990, Callaghan decided that "when The Wolfhounds finished, I just felt that I hadn't really done what I wanted to do... It was always a bit of a compromise with the other members of the band, most of whom were a bit more rock-oriented. I like rock music, but there were so many other things I wanted to do. In the back of my head I just thought, 'Well, I'm going to do everything now, I might never get the chance to do it again'... I went in to see Alan McGee because Creation had offered us a deal by then, and I said 'I'm not gonna do The Wolfhounds, I'm gonna do this new thing'."

Some of the ideas which would inform Moonshake had, however, begun in the last stages of The Wolfhounds. Callahan: "We'd used the sampler in the later days... I really loved the potential of that, and it just seemed to me that no one was fulfilling that potential. I wanted to compose things with it rather than just have loops or beats. I knew that I wasn't going to be able to do that in the Wolfhounds... We had already started discussions... that we were too mannish, too alpha male. It’s too laddish. We need some female input in this. We put an advert for a female guitarist. I didn't like and still don't like the way I sing now, so we wanted someone to kind of soften my voice and make it more interesting, perhaps even do harmonies. So I put an advert in the Melody Maker, and the only person to answer was Margaret Fiedler."

Callahan and Fiedler began sounding each other out, with Callahan recalling "we'd go to each other's houses and play each other's songs and would get impressed with what each other was doing. My initial idea for Moonshake was to have PiL's Metal Box with samples, and the harmonies of The Byrds over the top... When I saw what she was doing on her own, I knew it wasn't going to be like that. Because she was kind of writing really good, almost folk songs." As well as singing and playing guitar, Fiedler shared Callahan's interest in samplers. The pair recruited bass guitarist John Frenett and finally drummer Miguel "Mig" Morland.

Callahan and Fiedler alternated the lead vocal and songwriting duties for the band, both favouring very different approaches: Fiedler created surreal, ethereal and atmospheric material, while Callahan favoured harsher-sounding urban narratives. Due to this factor, the performance style of the band alternated considerably depending on which songwriter's songs were being played. Initially, the band's diversity added to its strength - in 2009, Fiedler recalled "I really liked Dave Callahan's songs and his voice - obviously! That's why I wanted to be in a band with him... We were different people and wrote differently, but came from the same influences - Can, PIL, Kraftwerk, Eric B & Rakim, and MBV to name a few bands. Moonshake was a collision - it was supposed to be a collision." Regardless of the divergence in approaches, all Moonshake songs made a strong use of textures, noise and sampler technology.

Although Callahan originally favoured Skyscraper as a project name, the band ultimately settled on the name Moonshake (taken from a Can single on the seminal Krautrockers' Future Days album).

=== First lineup - early EPs and Eva Luna (1991–1992) ===
Moonshake signed to Alan McGee's Creation Records for their debut EP, First, released in spring 1991. At this point, the band was continuing to follow the harsh-effected guitar-heavy sound which had characterised a lot of the last Wolfhounds recordings. The results drew comparisons with Sonic Youth and My Bloody Valentine, and lacked the dub element featured in later recordings. Callahan soon considered this a misstep. "We got really bad reviews in the music press. The record sold rather well because a lot of people liked weird head-fucky shoegaze stuff... I'm told lots of people really enjoyed tripping and listening to it. There's lots of stuff going on in the stereo and the speakers with different pans and stuff. People were getting quite freaked out with it. But it was too close to what a lot of other bands were doing, as far as I was concerned. We were supposed to be heading out on our own, and we kind of made a faltering step."

After the release of First, Moonshake signed to the emerging independent label Too Pure (home of PJ Harvey, Th' Faith Healers and Stereolab). Their first single for the new label was "Secondhand Clothes", which showed a leaning towards the dub-bass-heavy post-punk sound of bands such as Public Image Limited and The Pop Group. According to Callahan, the band was "determined...because we'd made such a false step with the Creation EP. The next one should really be a leap. And it was... We spent a long time in the studio kind of dismantling that song and putting it back together. Margaret spent most of the session with headphones, on a sampler, just trying to match things to the music. She turned a song I wrote into something a bit more forward-looking... And then when we got to the studio, we took it apart more. It was all about deconstruction and putting it back together in different ways. And it worked really well."

"Secondhand Clothes" was followed, in 1992, by the Beautiful Pigeon EP (which featured two rare songwriting collaborations between Callahan and Fiedler). The band began to earn many positive reviews for its unusual sample-driven and rhythmically propulsive sound, which drew on indie rock, noise-rock, breakbeats, electronica, psychedelia, dub, art-rock, Krautrock and punk. Callahan: "I really didn't like acid house and baggy and all that stuff that was going on in the UK... But hip hop really had it going on, and so did some of the American bands particularly in the late '80s... it was more the music, the investigation that a lot of hip hop producers did—slowing things down, playing the stereo one bit slower then the one bit faster, running things backwards, playing the samples like an instrument. All that stuff that started with Gang Starr and those kinds of people, we really loved that. We thought, "Well, we can do the same and perhaps we can write songs with this stuff.""

Moonshake's debut album, Eva Luna, followed in October 1992. It continued the alternation between the different song-stylings of Callahan and Fiedler. Callahan said that "if you listen to the line-up with her and me, it's a schizophrenic band... It’s got a dual personality. We did occasionally write songs together, but we were mostly flipsides to each other... But we'd also play with it more and have really noisy bits in her quiet songs and occasional really quiet bits in my noisy songs. The whole thing was meant to blend. There were definitely a lot of contradictions there, but that’s interesting in a band, isn't it?"

Callahan said that the band was "well prepared" for the recording sessions following extensive rehearsing (with co-producer/engineer Guy Fixsen already involved), but that they'd also embraced opportunities to improve the material further while in studio. "I remember struggling with "Seen & Not Heard"... trying to get all those different noisy guitars to sound separate from each other, but somehow still the same, was a challenge. It was a lot of fun. I remember sending some demos to Terry Edwards — he played the horns on it — and he came in and I just said to him, "Can you do some kind of free jazz on bits of it? And can you do an Ennio Morricone trumpet thing on the third verse?" I just thought he'd do something kind of token, but he came and did these amazing horn parts, and it just really lifts the whole song... (It's) a noisy, Stooges-inspired song... but it just takes it so much further, almost into jazz. I’m just really happy with the way that came out. It was such fun to hear someone doing such good parts on your songs. I couldn't recommend it more, to farm it out to people like Terry."

Variously described as "bursting with ideas and tension... a richly inventive, endlessly fascinating listen", "big, weird and unnerving" and "one hell of a ground-breaking record (which) stands resolutely alone among all of the albums released in 1992 as no other band has managed to create anything remotely similar before or since... a unique album with few equals", Eva Luna ultimately satisfied both Fiedler and Callahan. Callahan: "We knew we'd done something really good... We thought the "Secondhand Clothes" EP and (Eva Luna) had everything the band should be about on it. It had everything. We certainly thought we'd done something that was true to us that would either be ignored for being too out there or would make an impression. And, fortunately, it made an impression. We wanted it to be both weird and have songs. We wanted it to have an upside-down kind of layering. It needed to have big bass and drums, like some dub or funk records, but we also wanted to find ways to incorporate the samples in a way that didn’t sound like they were sellotaped on, like so many other bands. We wanted it to be completely enmeshed in the songs and the music. And I think we succeeded with that."

In between studio and writing sessions, the band spent 1992 touring Britain with The Wedding Present, Th' Faith Healers and PJ Harvey, as well as supporting Pulp in Paris.

=== Big Good Angel and split of original lineup (1993) ===
For 1993's mini-album Big Good Angel, both Callahan and Fiedler contributed three songs each. In 2024, Callahan recalled that Big Good Angel "has some of our best stuff on it. It's fantastic. But that was largely recorded separately. I recorded with Mig and John, for the most part, in a studio, and Margaret did a lot of her stuff at home with Guy, and just brought it into a studio to mix. She scrapped one of her songs as well, and we had to come back in again so she could do "Two Trains", which I think was pretty much entirely written and recorded at home."

During the summer of 1993, Moonshake played the Big Top Frenzy festival in Portsmouth, and then embarked on a brief American tour, playing variously with Radiohead, PJ Harvey, Pavement, Yo La Tengo, Liz Phair, Bailter Space and Nothing Painted Blue. By now the divergent styles of the two songwriters was producing too much creative tension for the band to survive for much longer. Callahan: "Margaret probably had slightly more songs than me on the first LP, and was feeling that she really needed to record with just her and Guy on her own, and she said as much to me in a meeting. I started to feel like maybe I was getting edged out of my own band... She wanted to record with Guy, who by that time was not just the producer, but her partner. So it was very much a sewn-together kind of thing. Whereas I was still out on my own." In 2009, Fiedler recalled that "maybe after a while, the tension that was there in our writing and singing styles spilled over into real life. Things did get extremely tense on the last tour we did together in 1993 in North America."

Following this tour, Moonshake split in half, with Margaret Fiedler and John Frenett departing to form a new band, Laika, with Fixsen. In 2009 Fiedler, recalling of the split, stated "it wasn't amicable. In fact it took me years to get over it, which is kinda sad to admit. I haven't spoken to Dave in years..." Earlier (in a 1995 Laika interview), she had commented "Laika is a close working collective; in Moonshake that was never possible. David and I always did what we liked. I have never compromised myself and that's the main reason why I was forced to leave the band. After the American tour David no longer wanted to work with me." Recalling the disagreement 30 years later, Callahan admitted "I felt like I lost my creative partner. Stupidly, I kind of rashly just rang her up once and said, "I don't want you to be in the band anymore," and she was really fucking upset. I felt quite bad about it. It was my fault for not being a very good communicator at that age." Callahan and Fiedler repaired their personal relationship in later years.

Casting a critical eye over the original Moonshake's work, in 2024, Callahan commented "to some extent, it was a failed experiment but I think a lot of it worked. And I think it sounds contemporary now, which shows we were doing something right."

=== Second lineup and The Sound Your Eyes Can Follow (1994–1995) ===
Moonshake was left as a duo of David Callahan and Mig Morland. With the loss of Fiedler's guitar-playing and with Callahan's increasing interest in samplers, the band began moving further away from indie rock and psychedelia and deeper into Callahan's art-punk/film-noir stylings as the duo began to write and record the band's second full-length album, The Sound Your Eyes Can Follow.

Callahan recalls that "I wanted to change direction. The Sound Your Eyes Can Follow was meant to be my kind of White Light/White Heat or Trout Mask Replica where it was not as hi-fi as the earlier stuff and a splurge of creativity. I didn’t like the studio and I didn’t really get on with the engineer, but somehow we managed to do something. It’s kind of weird because it’s really forward-looking in places and quite retro sounding in others. It’s a very odd record."

While recording The Sound Your Eyes Can Follow, Callahan and Morland drew on a host of guest musicians. Collapsed Lung's bass player Johnny Dawe covered for the departed Frenett, while horns were added by trumpeter Andrew Blick (Blowpipe) and saxophonist Raymond Dickaty (from Gallon Drunk and Skree). In addition, PJ Harvey, Stereolab keyboard player Katharine Gifford and Sidi Bou Said members Lee Howton and Claire Lemmon all contributed vocals, ensuring that Moonshake on record would retain a strong female component in spite of Fiedler's departure. Harvey, in particular, made a striking guest contribution on "Just a Working Girl".

Callahan: "It was my chance — and I don't think I succeeded in this — to go partly back to my original idea for the band, which was to have harmonies. Unfortunately, at the time, my voice wasn’t the kind of voice you could harmonize with (laughter). Certainly, it wasn’t the other vocalists' fault; I thought they were great. It seems like every day we were just ushering people through the door, getting them to do a couple of hours, and ushering them out again. But I know we had fun."

The band refused to use an outside producer for the sessions and self-produced instead, labelling producers as "an overpaid imposition". Callahan remembers "(It) came out nothing like I wanted it to (laughter). I definitely had plans. We were using this big room at a studio called Blackwing that the Cocteau Twins, The Family Cat, and others had used before us. I had hundreds of sheets of paper over the wall with — because I can't read music — mixing and arranging diagrams of horns and samples and whose vocals went where... I had all this stuff written out on scraps of paper and stuck to the wall. It looked like a hoarder’s front room. In the studio I'd say, "I want a double bass on this." And I'd try to find a double bass player on the phone in the studio, and they'd come in the next day. It was all quite chaotic, and it sounds chaotic because of that. I could have carried on recording that for months. In a way I wish I'd got an actual producer in to make a bit more sense of it, but a lot of people like the chaos, so who am I to say?"

The Sound Your Eyes Can Follow was released in 1994 (a few months before Fiedler, Frenett and Fixsen followed with their debut as Laika). It revealed that Moonshake had completely banned guitars from their new sound, relying entirely on the combination of Dickaty's saxophones with looped and layered samples over the rhythm section (in a similar manner to The Young Gods). Compared to earlier recordings, the new Moonshake material was jazzier (with extensive horn parts) and more direct. Callahan wrote all of the songs for the record, with his bleak, vivid urban vision now uninterrupted and untempered by Fiedler's more psychedelic approaches.

Callahan asserts that "some of the best songs I've ever written are on The Sound Your Eyes Can Follow and they haven’t come out how I wanted them to. But a lot of people seem to like them, so that's great... I will probably never write any songs better than those. So I'm just glad they’re there. I just wish they'd been recorded or arranged a bit better. If anything, I should have toned down the yelling and sung things more gently because the music's rough and weird enough. I don't need to be all angular over (the) top of it."

During the recording of The Sound Your Eyes Can Follow, Dickaty had joined the band as a full-time member and Matt Brewer was recruited as the new bass guitarist. When Morland then left the band to join Moose, Callahan was left as the sole surviving original member. Morland's last recording with the band was a non-album single for the Clawfist Singles Club, recorded in March 1994 but not released until March 1995. A cover version of the Jay Livingston/Ray Evans song "Lola, Lola" from the Blue Angel soundtrack (backed by another cover of Cole Porter's "Always True to You in My Fashion"), it also featured Melissa Gates in a brief tenure as the band's second singer.

Morland was replaced on drums by Kevin Bass, and although Gates did not continue with the band, Katharine Gifford continued to guest as female harmony singer on live Moonshake dates. One song from this period, "Heart Keeps Beating" was entirely sung by Gifford: although it was never recorded and placed on one of the band's albums, the band did record a live version at the Disobey Club in London, featuring Terry Edwards on saxophone plus several guest musicians from London skronk-improv band Skree (as "Skree Timelord Arkestra"). This was released on the Blast First compilation 3 Fingers and a Fumb in May 1994.

The Sound Your Eyes Can Follow received good reviews which were not matched by sales, and some time after the release of the album Moonshake parted company with Too Pure. The band's line-up continued to fluctuate over the next few years, with Callahan later remembering "it really ended up being like The Fall or Stereolab, where there were constantly people coming in and out of the band all the time, which is not how I wanted it. I wanted a core that we could work with all the time. I had to audition people all the time, and then we had to do more rehearsals. Every time someone new came in the band, we'd have to rehearse. Often, we were playing to clicks and samples that were rigidly looped. And that meant that we had to be rigidly rehearsed, and the drummers had to wear headphones and really be locked in with the samples, which takes quite a lot of work."

=== The C/Z years - Dirty & Divine and final split (1996–1997) ===
Kevin Bass left Moonshake in late 1995, and was replaced on drums by Michael Rother (not to be confused with his namesake in Neu!). This new line-up began recording what would turn out to be the band's final album, Dirty & Divine, in December 1995, completing it in February 1996.

Compared to The Sound Your Eyes Can Follow, Dirty & Divine featured a far less prominent role for female vocals (reduced more to harmonies) and reduced instrumentation, being recorded by a core group of Callahan, Brewer, Rother and Dickaty (with vocal assistance from Katharine Gifford, Stereolab's Mary Hansen and Kate Blackshaw). The album contained various songs which had been played in the Moonshake set during the previous two years, with subjects ranging from sailor's tales, the lives and deaths of cities, addictions to risk and danger and sexual fantasy in advertising. Regarding his approach on this album, Callahan has commented "I wanted to empty it out a bit. I was still aiming to fulfil my goal of actually writing songs with the samples, which I probably did the most on Dirty & Divine. Sometimes, on The Sound Your Eyes Can Follow, I'd make up a bassline, put some words to that, and then try and fit a lot of the samples around it. On Dirty & Divine I started off just combining samples that I liked and playing with them. The songs are all written that way. They start from the connections between the samples before the band gets to play on them.... (There's) some great songs on there."

The Dirty & Divine sessions would prove to be Katharine Gifford's last work with the band: having guested on the sessions, she moved on to form Snowpony (where she was later joined by another former Moonshake member, Kevin Bass). Following the end of the sessions, a new female vocalist, Victoria "Tor" Maxwell, was recruited for live touring: she arrived in time to sing on a remixed version of upcoming Dirty & Divine track "Nothing But Time", which was released on a Volume compilation (Volume Sixteen +it - Copulation Explosion!) in June 1996.

"I like the fact that I can make a record and you won’t get it all in a few sittings, you can go back and hear different things all the time. ‘Cause if I didn’t do that I’d get bored myself, and I like to think listeners want to hear different things. If people do go back, then I’ve been successful... I think the songs are dense, and they hopefully make you think, and thinking is entertaining. People aren’t encouraged to think, and they lack proper entertainment because of that... You should question things until you die. I like music that makes people uneasy. It makes your mind work overtime."

— David Callahan

Moonshake had now signed with the Seattle indie label C/Z Records, which released Dirty & Divine in the USA in May 1996 (a licensed UK release followed later, via World Domination Recordings). With C/Z determined to promote the band in America, Moonshake joined the 1996 Lollapalooza tour of the American Midwest (headlined by Metallica and Wu-Tang Clan) from late June to early August. The latter experience proved disappointing - assigned to "the third stage", the band played from the back of a truck some distance from the main arena. Dickaty recalled "with other so-called 'alternative' artists, we played to a largely indifferent crowd of thrill-seeking metal fans." While unimpressed by their treatment by the Lollapalooza organisation, the band maintained an affection for the United States and continued to tour there whenever possible. Callahan had already discovered that American audiences were "much more open-minded. I think they'd had enough of grunge and all that kind of stuff... we were finding these audiences that had been into post-hardcore in the late '80s and were tired of mainstream rock and seemed to be waiting for bands like us to come along and go a bit more out there... So we toured there a lot."

The band returned to the United States for three months of touring with (variously) New Kingdom, Codeine and The Grifters. By this time, however, three years of self-management and hard touring with little reward had exhausted the band. In 1997, shortly after the UK release of Dirty & Divine, Callahan moved to the United States (briefly relocating to Brooklyn, New York) and the band finally split, albeit amicably. An EP of Moonshake remixes – originally commissioned to promote the Dirty & Divine album – was belatedly issued in 1999, though this release was disowned by Callahan.

In 2022, Callahan said that "most people had faith in us, but not enough."

=== Post-Moonshake ===
David Callahan's time in the United States was brief, and he returned to London soon afterwards. He re-emerged on the London music scene in the early 2000s, setting up a multimedia/DJ/music project called The $urplus!. In its band formation (in which Callahan was joined by singer Anja Buechele) The $urplus! released a single self-titled EP containing four songs, resembling Moonshake's later material but with a lighter and less brutal approach, the inclusion of guitars, and Callahan and Buechele operating as much more equal partners than was the case with latter-day Moonshake. The band briefly experimented with an expanded garage-rock lineup, but did not release any more material (although Buechele later contributed to the revived Bark Psychosis). Post-$urplus, Callahan involved himself in other work including warehouse work, DJing and ultimately studying for a Master's Degree in Taxonomy and Biodiversity which led to work as a nature writer.

In 2004, Callahan reformed The Wolfhounds, initially for live performances in 2004 and 2006, but with a full and ongoing reunion following in 2010. He began a full solo career in 2021 as David Lance Callahan, describing himself as a "dissonant electric folk singer" and performing songs informed by folk, blues and experimental sound. In recent years, he has also worked with Swell Maps C21 and Manyfingers.

Raymond Dickaty went on to join Spiritualized and stayed with them until 2002, following which he studied free improvisation. He later worked with The Duke Spirit, AMP, Zukanican and his own free-jazz/rock fusion band, Solar Fire Trio. In 2006, he joined the Ninja Tune band, Loka. Relocating to Poland in 2009, he became a member of both the Trifonidis Free Orchestra and the Tricphonix Streetband.

In early 2019, Callahan began hinting in Facebook posts that he was working on new Moonshake material (although he provided no details on collaborators or a proposed release date) alongside his ongoing Wolfhounds and solo work. He also began work on a new blog called 'On the Rock'n'Roll' dealing with "a history of making music on the dole, incorporating anecdotes, interviews, musical selections, social history, dirty squatters, social security scroungers, workshy ponces and a whole load of cultural misappropriation", for which the first entry related to Moonshake performing a 1997 record label showcase in New Orleans while Callahan and Michael Rother were simultaneously waiting for imminent DSS Restart interviews back in the UK.

In 2022, Callahan and Fiedler collaborated on a remastering of the debut Moonshake album Eva Luna for a deluxe edition, which was released on vinyl and as a download by Beggars Arkive.

== Connections ==
During his Moonshake years, David Callahan enjoyed brief cameos with contemporaries (and originally, Too Pure labelmates) Stereolab, performing "French Disko" with them on Channel 4's The Word in 1993, and the Stereolab spin-off project Turn On. Ray Dickaty also played with Stereolab, appearing on several tracks recorded around the time of their Emperor Tomato Ketchup album. The connection also went the other way: Stereolab's Mary Hansen and Katharine Gifford provided backing vocals on Moonshake's last album Dirty and Divine. Some copies of Dirty and Divine were even stickered to alert potential buyers to Hansen's presence.

== Members ==
- David Callahan - vocals, guitar (1991–1997)
- Miguel "Mig" Moreland - drums (1991–1995)
- Margaret Fielder - vocals, guitar (1991–1993)
- John Frenett - bass (1991–1993)
- Matt Brewer - bass (1994–1997)
- Raymond Dickaty - saxophone (1994–1997)
- Katharine Gifford - vocals (1994–1996)
- Kevin Bass - drums (1995–1996)
- Michael Rother - drums (1996–1997)

== Discography ==
=== Singles ===
- First EP (1991, Creation Records)
- Secondhand Clothes EP (1991, Too Pure)
- "Beautiful Pigeon" (1992, Too Pure)
- "Lola Lola" b/w "Always True to You in My Fashion" (1995, Clawfist Singles Club)
- "Cranes" (1996, C/Z / World Domination)

=== Albums ===
- Eva Luna (1992, Too Pure / 1993, Matador / Atlantic)
- Big Good Angel (Mini-album) (1993, Too Pure / Matador)
- The Sound Your Eyes Can Follow (1994, Too Pure / American)
- Dirty & Divine (1996, C/Z-BMG / World Domination)
- Remixes (1999, C/Z)

=== Compilation appearances ===
- Beautiful Pigeon (1992, V/A "Independent Top 20 Volume 15", Beechwood Music; the track "Night Tripper" also appeared on a 7" single given away with the vinyl edition of this LP)
- Just a Working Girl (1994, V/A "Pop - Do We Not Like That?", Too Pure)
- Nothing but Time (1995, V/A "Volume 16 - Copulation Explosion")
