= John Frenett =

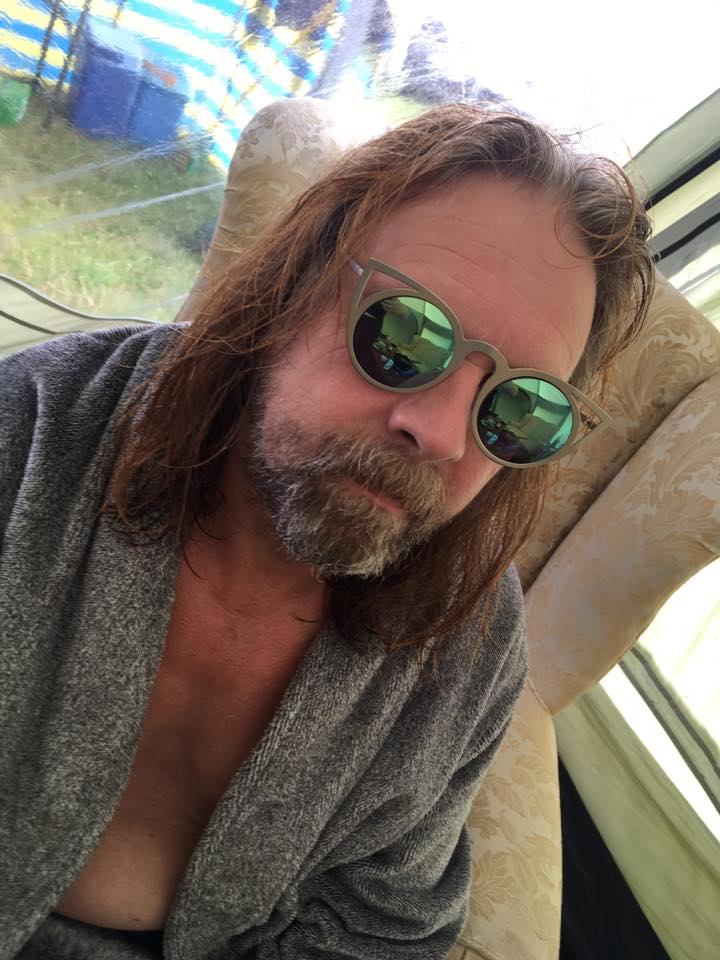

Background information
- Origin: London
- Genres: Indie electronic, Dream pop, Post-rock
- Occupation(s): Musician, Farmer
- Instrument: Bass

John Frenett is an English bassist, best known for his slippery dub-style playing in the bands Moonshake and Laika in the 1990s.

He had formed The Hangovers with former The Raincoats member Gina Birch, and played bass and guitar on their debut album, Slow Dirty Tears released in 1998. He had contributed bass to "Tamagnocchi" on Mouse on Mars' Autoditacker LP in 1997.
