= The Kitchen Tapes (The Raincoats album) =

Live album by The Raincoats
- Released: 1983
- Recorded: 12 December 1982
- Venue: The Kitchen for the Performing Arts, New York City
- Genre: Post-punk
- Label: ROIR
- Producer: John Hanti

The Raincoats chronology
Odyshape (1981)	The Kitchen Tapes (1983)	Moving (1984)

Professional ratings
Review scores
Source	Rating
AllMusic	4/5 stars
City Pages	(favourable)
PopMatters	8/10 stars

The Kitchen Tapes, released by ROIR in 1983, is the only live album by the Raincoats. It is a recording of a December 1982 performance at The Kitchen in New York City. It was originally released on cassette only, but was reissued in 1995 and 1998 on CD.

== Reception ==
Graham Flashner, Douglas Wolk, and Ira Robbins of Trouser Press find in the performance and recording on one hand "a shimmery curtain of lovely sound" with "fascinating vocal arrangements" but also a "potential for cacophony". The AllMusic review calls it "Rough, loose-limbed, warm, and exciting". Greil Marcus called the performance "the process of punk: the move from enormous feeling combined with very limited technique—more to the point, enormous feeling unleashed by the first stirrings of very limited technique—to much more advanced technique in search of subject matter suited to it", expanding that "It’s this move that the Raincoats’ music has captured, perhaps more fully than that of any other band".

== Track listing ==
All tracks composed by The Raincoats, except where indicated

No.	Title	Original album	Length
1.	"No One's Little Girl"	Moving	3:38
2.	"Balloonacy"	Moving	4:19
3.	"Oh Oh La La La"	Moving	3:17
4.	"Only Loved at Night"	Odyshape	3:21
5.	"I Saw a Hill"	Moving	3:13
6.	"Mouth of a Story"	Moving	3:14
7.	"The Body"	Moving	3:32
8.	"Shouting Out Loud"	Odyshape	3:19
9.	"Rainstorm"	Moving	3:55
10.	"Dance of Hopping Mad"	Moving	5:00
11.	"Animal Rhapsody"	Moving	3:55
12.	"Puberty Song" (Traditional)		1:17
13.	"No Side to Fall In"	The Raincoats	1:12
14.	"Honey Mad Woman"	Moving	3:05

== Personnel ==
- Vicki Aspinall - vocals, piano, violin
- Gina Birch - vocals, bass, guitar
- Ana da Silva - vocals, guitar, percussion
- Richard Dudanski - drums, percussion
- Paddy O'Connell - bass, guitar, saxophone
- Derek Goddard - drums, percussion

Technical

- Michael Whittaker - live mix/recording sound engineer
- Greil Marcus - liner notes
