= Odyshape =

Studio album by the Raincoats
- Released: 1 June 1981
- Recorded: March–June 1980
- Studio: Bob's Berry Street Studio, Clerkenwell, London
- Genre: Post-punk, experimental
- Length: 34:54
- Label: Rough Trade – ROUGH13
- Producer: Adam Kidron, the Raincoats

The Raincoats chronology
The Raincoats (1979)	Odyshape (1981)	The Kitchen Tapes (1983)

Odyshape is the second album by the Raincoats, released on 1 June 1981 by Rough Trade.

The album was reissued in 1993 by Geffen Records, inspired by Kurt Cobain's public praise for the group.

== Recording ==
Stylistically, Odyshape was a radical departure from the band's first album, featuring a diverse range of instruments, such as the shruti box, balophone, shehnai and kalimba, which they picked up at junk shops and markets or brought back from New York after their 1980 tour. The band incorporated influences from ethnic field recordings and musicians such as Ornette Coleman, and often swapped instrumental roles to freshen the arrangements.

Odyshape was recorded after Palmolive, the band's original drummer, had left the group. Palmolive's original replacement, Ingrid Weiss, left during the start of the recording, leaving the band without a drummer, though Weiss is given a co-writing credit on two of the album’s nine songs. The Raincoats eventually hired Richard Dudanski (P.I.L.), Charles Hayward (This Heat) and Robert Wyatt (Soft Machine) to contribute percussion parts for the album.

The album cover was based on the painting Peasant Woman by Russian artist Kazimir Malevich.

== Reception ==
Professional ratings
Review scores
Source	Rating
AllMusic	4.5/5 stars
Drowned in Sound	8/10
NME	9/10
Pitchfork	8.0/10
The Rolling Stone Album Guide	3/5 stars
Select	4/5
Spin	8/10
Spin Alternative Record Guide	9/10
Uncut	5/5 stars

In retrospective assessments of the album, Pitchfork reviewer Nick Neyland said, "This album has little in common with anything else around at the time, other than the feeling that you're hurtling relentlessly forward into a previously unmapped musical space... It's a very intimate recording, full of sounds they wisely never tried to recreate again, and vocal takes that are often inflected with a heart-crushing vulnerability." Critic Simon Reynolds called it "postpunk that's been totally unrocked." In a 30th anniversary look-back, BBC Music writer Chris Power said, "More than the exotic instrumentation, though, it's the extraordinary structures of Odyshape's songs that distinguish it. They don't so much begin and end as ebb and flow in a way that, historically, seems to have bewildered at least as many listeners as it's beguiled." Noel Gardner of Drowned in Sound described the "new instruments" as essential to the recordings, noting that "you'd never call any of it 'prog', really, but the spirit of the commie beardos that comprised the Seventies Canterbury scene is being carried here nevertheless."

The album was reissued in 1993 by Geffen Records, inspired by Kurt Cobain's public praise for the group. The reissue features liner notes by Kim Gordon.

== Track listing ==
All tracks composed by the Raincoats; except where indicated

1. "Shouting Out Loud" (The Raincoats, Ingrid Weiss) – 4:54
2. "Family Treet" (The Raincoats, Caroline Scott) – 4:12
3. "Only Loved at Night" – 3:32
4. "Dancing in My Head" – 5:26
5. "Odyshape" (The Raincoats, Ingrid Weiss) – 3:37
6. "And Then It's O.K." (The Raincoats, lyrics by Caroline Scott) – 3:05
7. "Baby Song" – 4:54
8. "Red Shoes" – 2:51
9. "Go Away" – 2:23

== Personnel ==
The Raincoats

- Ana da Silva – vocals, guitar, shruti box, kalimba, bass, percussion, harmonica
- Gina Birch – vocals, bass, guitar, balafon
- Vicky Aspinall – vocals, guitar, bass, violin, piano

with:

- Georgie Born – cello on "Family Treet" and "Dancing in My Head"
- Dick O’Dell — ektare on “Baby Song”
- Kadir Durvesh — shenhai on “Dancing In My Head”
- Ingrid Weiss – drums on “Shouting Out Loud” and “Odyshape”; finger cymbals on "And Then It's O.K."
- Robert Wyatt – drums on "And Then It's O.K."
- Richard Dudanski – percussion on "Dancing in My Head"
- Charles Hayward – drums on "Family Treet" and "Go Away"; additional percussion on “Only Loved At Night”
- Ingrid Weiss – drums on "Shouting Out Loud" and "Odyshape"

== Cover versions ==
"Only Loved at Night" was covered by Softboiled Eggies for the Rough Trade Shops – Counter Culture 08 compilation (2009).
