= I Play My Bass Loud =

Studio album by Gina Birch
- Released: 24 February 2023
- Genre: Alternative rock; dub
- Length: 44:53
- Label: Third Man
- Producer: Youth

Gina Birch chronology
I Play My Bass Loud (2023)	Trouble (2025)

I Play My Bass Loud is the debut solo studio album by English musician Gina Birch, released on 24 February 2023 through Third Man Records. The album was produced by Youth and preceded by the single "Feminist Song" in September 2021. It received acclaim from critics and was ranked on several lists of the best albums of the year.

== Critical reception ==
Professional ratings
Aggregate scores
Source	Rating
Metacritic	82/100
Review scores
Source	Rating
AllMusic	4/5 stars
Classic Rock	4/5 stars
Mojo	4/5 stars
Pitchfork	7.5/10
Uncut	4/5 stars
Under the Radar	7/10 stars

I Play My Bass Loud received a score of 82 out of 100 on review aggregator Metacritic based on six critics' reviews, indicating "universal acclaim". Classic Rock wrote that "for Raincoats fans this is the most similar to their underrated third album Moving, for its fluent, danceable, off-kilter rhythms. For everyone else it's a marvel waiting to be discovered". Fred Thomas of AllMusic felt that it "calls on her roots as a post-punk pioneer with the Raincoats as often as it ventures into new territory with little regard for parameters of genre or limitations of any kind".

Matthew Blackwell of Pitchfork called it "both a celebration of her status as a godmother of feminist rock and a furious protest against the persecution of women", as well as anything but a lonely bedroom-pop album" and "fundamentally a bass album". Mojo's Lucy O'Brien also found it to be "a combination of witty feminist manifesto and a celebration of the bass guitar – through alt-rock, dub and distorted rhythm".

Uncut's Rob Hughes described it as "so thoroughly compelling it makes you wish she'd got around to it a little sooner" and ultimately "enough to suggest that Birch, now into her late sixties, might just be entering her next great creative phase". Ian Rushbury of Under the Radar commented that "Birch's reggae-inspired basslines underpin almost everything on the album" and concluded that it is "a lot of fun to listen to. It's heartfelt, naïve, and made with genuine love for the material".

Mojo ranked I Play My Bass Loud the 41st best album of 2023, while Louder Than War ranked it 73rd on their list.

== Track listing ==
All tracks are written by Gina Birch, except where noted.

I Play My Bass Loud track listing
No.	Title	Writer(s)	Length
1.	"I Play My Bass Loud"		4:27
2.	"Then It Happened"		2:41
3.	"Wish I Was You"	Birch; Martin Glover	3:23
4.	"Big Mouth"		3:12
5.	"Pussy Riot"	Birch; Helen McCallum	4:29
6.	"I Am Rage"	Birch; Glover	4:09
7.	"I Will Never Wear Stilettos"		4:28
8.	"Dance Like a Demon"	Birch; Glover	4:16
9.	"Digging Down"	Birch; McCallum; Michael Rendall	5:07
10.	"Feminist Song"		4:35
11.	"Let's Go Crazy"		4:06
Total length:			44:53

== Charts ==
Chart performance for I Play My Bass Loud
Chart (2023)	Peak position
Scottish Albums (OCC)	76
UK Independent Albums (OCC)	25
