= Looking in the Shadows =

Studio album by The Raincoats
- Released: 14 May 1996
- Studio: Trident 2, London
- Genre: Alternative rock
- Length: 47:41
- Label: Rough Trade (UK), DGC (US)
- Producer: Ed Buller

The Raincoats chronology
Moving (1984)	Looking in the Shadows (1996)

Professional ratings
Review scores
Source	Rating
AllMusic	4/5 stars
Robert Christgau	B+
The Encyclopedia of Popular Music	3/5 stars
MusicHound Rock: The Essential Album Guide	3.5/5 stars
NME	1/10
Pitchfork	7.4/10
Rolling Stone	4/5 stars
Spin	8/10

Looking in the Shadows is the fourth studio album by British alternative rock group the Raincoats, released in 1996 by Rough Trade and DGC. It was the band's first album in 12 years (after 1984's Moving).

== Production ==
The album was produced by Ed Buller. The Raincoats' original members, Gina Birch and Ana da Silva, had to relearn their instruments prior to recording Looking in the Shadows.

== Critical reception ==
The Hartford Courant wrote: "With a bent toward electronic sounds and a playful, revealing manner in the lyrics, the band succeeds in creating music that reflects not some sort of nostalgia for what the Raincoats used to be but considerable understanding in what they came to be." The Washington Post wrote that "the Raincoats may be grown up now, but on songs like 'Love a Loser' they still juxtapose harsh and sweet as bracingly as ever."

== Track listing ==
No.	Title	Writer	Length
1.	"Only Tonight"	Ana da Silva	3:30
2.	"Don't Be Mean"	Gina Birch	3:59
3.	"Forgotten Words"	da Silva	3:36
4.	"Pretty"	Birch	4:17
5.	"Truth is Hard"	da Silva	2:57
6.	"Babydog"	Birch	5:05
7.	"You Ask Why"	da Silva	3:58
8.	"57 Ways to End It All"	Birch	5:31
9.	"So Damn Early"	da Silva	4:12
10.	"You Kill Me"	Birch	3:58
11.	"Love a Loser"	Birch	3:30
12.	"Looking in the Shadows"	da Silva	3:14

== Personnel ==
The Raincoats

- Gina Birch – vocals, bass, guitar, feedback, fuzz guitar, distortion
- Ana da Silva – vocals, bass, rhythm guitar, keyboards, 12-string guitar, slide guitar, sruthi, design
- Anne Wood – bass, guitar, violin

with:

- Ed Buller – piano, Moog synthesizer
- Heather Dunn – bass, drums
- Simon Fisher Turner – vocals on "Love a Loser"
- Pete Shelley – vocals on "Love a Loser"

Technical

- Gary Stout – programming, computer editing
- Shirley O'Loughlin – photography
- Maria Mochnacz – photography
