= The Raincoats (disambiguation) =

The Raincoats are a British experimental rock and punk rock band.

The Raincoats or Raincoat may also refer to:

- The Raincoats, the debut album by The Raincoats
- "The Raincoats" (Seinfeld), a two-part Seinfeld TV episode
- Raincoat, clothing
- "Raincoat", a song by pop duo Timeflies and singer Kira Kosarin
