= Moving (The Raincoats album) =

Studio album by The Raincoats
- Released: 27 January 1984; 15 February 1994
- Recorded: October–November 1982; August–September 1983
- Studio: Berry Street Studios and Regents Park Studios, London
- Genre: Post-punk
- Length: 48:34
- Label: Rough Trade - ROUGH66; DGC Records
- Producer: Adam Kidron, Brad Grisdale

The Raincoats chronology
The Kitchen Tapes (1983)	Moving (1984)	Looking in the Shadows (1996)

Professional ratings
Review scores
Source	Rating
AllMusic	4/5 stars

Moving, released by Rough Trade Records on 27 January 1984, is the third studio album by the Raincoats. It was re-released in the US by DGC Records in February 1994 and in the UK by Rough Trade in 1994, with a different track list and altered cover art. On its original release, the album reached No. 5 in the UK Indie Chart. It was to be their last album for 12 years.

== Reissue version ==
When preparing the album for reissue in 1994, the group's core members elected to remove one song written by Vicki Aspinall, 'Honey Mad Woman', and two written and sung by drummer Richard Dudanski, 'Avidoso' and 'Dreaming in the Past'. Aspinall had requested the removal of her song, but Dudanski was not consulted, a fact that his former bandmates now regret. The song 'No-one's Little Girl', previously a standalone single, was added to the track listing. Delia Sparrow and Anjali Bhatia of British indie all-female group Mambo Taxi contributed to the reissue’s liner notes. The cover art was also changed for the reissue: the outlines of three women and one man became three women.

== Track listings ==
=== Original Release (1983) ===
1. "Ooh Ooh La La La"
2. "Dreaming in the Past"
3. "Mouth of a Story"
4. "Honey Mad Woman"
5. "Rainstorm"
6. "Dance of Hopping Mad"
7. "Balloon"
8. "I Saw a Hill"
9. "Overheard"
10. "The Body"
11. "Avidoso"
12. "Animal Rhapsody"

=== Reissue (1994) ===
1. "No One's Little Girl"
2. "Ooh Ooh La La La"
3. "Dance of Hopping Mad"
4. "Balloon"
5. "Mouth of a Story"
6. "I Saw a Hill"
7. "Overheard"
8. "Rainstorm"
9. "The Body"
10. "Animal Rhapsody"

== Personnel ==
The Raincoats

- Vicky Aspinall - vocals, organ, bass, piano, violin
- Gina Birch - vocals, bass, guitar, vibraphone
- Ana da Silva - vocals, guitar, percussion

with:

- Harry Beckett - trumpet, flugelhorn
- Richard Dudanski - percussion, drums, balafon
- Michael McEvoy - synthesiser bass on "Animal Rhapsody", horn arrangements
- Paddy O'Connell - bass, tenor saxophone, penny whistle
- Derek Goddard - percussion, bongos, conga, drums
- Roger Freeman - percussion
- Chris "C.P." Lee - trumpet
- Mgotse Mothie - double bass
