= The Raincoats (album) =

1979 studio album by the Raincoats

Studio album by the Raincoats
- Released: 21 November 1979
- Recorded: 1979
- Studios: Berry Street, Clerkenwell, London
- Genres: Post-punk; experimental rock; art punk; folk punk
- Length: 31:26 (original release); 34:27 (1993 reissue with extra track)
- Label: Rough Trade - ROUGH3
- Producers: Geoff Travis; Mayo Thompson; The Raincoats

The Raincoats chronology
The Raincoats (1979)	Odyshape (1981)

The Raincoats is the debut album by English post-punk band the Raincoats. It was released on 21 November 1979 as one of the first records issued by the London-based independent label Rough Trade. The album is perhaps best known for its off-kilter cover of "Lola" by the Kinks. The album peaked at number 5 on the UK Indie Chart.

The album was ranked number 41 by Paste on their list of "The 50 Best Post-Punk Albums" (2016), number 39 by Treble on "The 100 Best Post-Punk Albums" (2018), number 6 by PopMatters in "The 50 Best Post-Punk Albums Ever" (2020), and number 398 by Rolling Stone on their list of the "500 Greatest Albums of All Time" (2020).

== Background ==
In 1979, three of the four members were living in squats – Vicky Aspinall in Brixton, Gina Birch in Monmouth Road, Bayswater, where the band frequently rehearsed. The squatting culture informed the lifestyle and music of the band with an onus on improvisation and DIY. The band conveyed an egalitarian ethos in their early live performances: each member was positioned to have equal visual prominence on stage, and the band dressed in everyday punk fashion no different from the ordinary "street clothes" of the audience members.

== Recording and production ==
Upon the recording of the album, musician and visual artist Mayo Thompson of the Red Krayola was joined by Geoff Travis (founder of Rough Trade Records) to produce, Thompson suggested that Vicky Aspinall approach violin in the style of Velvet Underground viola player John Cale. Thompson remarked:

It was one of those things. I came into Rough Trade one day and Geoff said, there's a band called the Raincoats, I want to make a record with them, I want you to go around and listen to rehearsal and help them out and see if there's anything you can contribute.

Bassist Gina Birch later remarked, "Mayo gave me confidence to use my instinct to make something, forging something out of nothing".

== Music ==
Writers Simon Reynolds and Joy Press described the album's music as "ragged, homespun folk-punk, with its elastic rhythms, reedy vocals and rickety structures." It has also been described as consisting of "forward-thinking" experimental rock. "Life on the Line" had the original lyrics penned by the original guitarist, Ross Crighton, about a suicide at Ladbroke Grove tube station.

== Release ==
The Raincoats was re-released by Rough Trade in 1993 on CD, with liner notes by Nirvana frontman Kurt Cobain, who had previously detailed his admiration for the band in the liner notes to the Nirvana compilation Incesticide. The album was again re-released on 9 November 2009 on vinyl on We ThRee (the band's own label) in the UK and on the Kill Rock Stars label in the U.S. This edition included a free mp3 download and an extra track, "Fairytale in the Supermarket", as well as a special edition bonus CD, including live footage from 1978 and 1979 and a video of "Fairytale in the Supermarket".

== Critical reception ==
Professional ratings
Review scores
Source	Rating
AllMusic	4.5/5 stars
Christgau's Record Guide	B+
Mojo	4/5 stars
NME	9/10
Q	4/5 stars
Record Collector	4/5 stars
The Rolling Stone Album Guide	4/5 stars
Select	4/5
Spin Alternative Record Guide	10/10
Uncut	9/10

The Raincoats was ranked number 41 by Paste on their list of "The 50 Best Post-Punk Albums" (2016), number 39 by Treble on "The 100 Best Post-Punk Albums" (2018), number 6 by PopMatters in "The 50 Best Post-Punk Albums Ever" (2020), and number 398 by Rolling Stone on their list of the "500 Greatest Albums of All Time".

In 1996, the critic Neil Strauss named it among the 100 most influential albums in "alternative" music in a Rolling Stone book on the subject. AllMusic retrospectively praised the album, stating, "This music, even at its most dissonant, is stunning and captivating".

Writers Simon Reynolds and Joy Press wrote that The Raincoats: "bends and buckles rock form but doesn't break it" and "An all-time great".

Charles Ubaghs, in retrospective articles for The Quietus and Tiny Mix Tapes, lauded the band and their album as exemplars of new musical exploration in the wake of the late-'70s punk movement. Ubaughs dubbed it "a passionate new that screamed of possibility", noting the band's fusion of "oddball rhythms", use of the violin, and more that lead to "forward-thinking" music.

BrooklynVegan retrospectively accredited the album's influence to the sound of later DIY scenes as well as the work of Beat Happening, Vivian Girls, and Electrelane. PopMatters stated the Raincoats shaped trends that would continue through groups such as Half Japanese and Beat Happening, such as using "lo-fi" and "idiosyncratic" pop music elements.

The Raincoats has been retroactively recognized as a landmark in indie pop, new wave, and post-punk music. The Vinyl Factory stated the record presaged the riot grrrl movement. In May 2010, the Raincoats performed the album in its entirety in London.

In 2026 Rolling Stone placed it at 25 on their list of The 100 Greatest Punk Albums of All Time.

== In popular culture ==
The Raincoats were referenced in the 2016 film 20th Century Women. Director and screenwriter Mike Mills praised their debut's "wobbliness", noting that the music's fragility gave it a "more human and inviting" aspect. He said that he attempted to feature these aspects into his writing.

In his posthumously published collection of writings called Journals, musician Kurt Cobain featured The Raincoats at number 21 on his list of "Top 50 albums". The album's sixth track, "The Void", was covered by Nirvana during a rehearsal in 1993, as well as by Hole in 1993.

== Track listing ==
"Fairytale in the Supermarket" was the Raincoats' first single, and has been included as the opening track on all reissues of the album since 1993.

All tracks are written by the Raincoats, except where noted.

Side A
No.	Title	Writer(s)	Length
1.	"No Side to Fall In"		1:50
2.	"Adventures Close to Home"	The Slits	1:54
3.	"Off Duty Trip"		3:16
4.	"Black and White"		2:29
5.	"Lola"	Ray Davies	4:04

Side B
No.	Title	Length
1.	"The Void"	3:52
2.	"Life on the Line"	4:23
3.	"You're a Million"	3:54
4.	"In Love"	3:06
5.	"No Looking" (lyrics translated and adapted by the Raincoats from a poem by Jacques Prévert)	3:06

== Personnel ==
The Raincoats:

- Ana da Silva – vocals, guitar, keyboards
- Gina Birch – vocals, bass guitar
- Palmolive – drums
- Vicky Aspinall – vocals, violin, guitar

With:

- Lora Logic – saxophone on "Black and White"

Technical credits:

- Adam Kidron – engineer
- Geoff Travis, Mayo Thompson, and the Raincoats – producers
- Pang Hsiao-Li – cover painting
- Shirley O'Loughlin – photography
