= California Star (album) =

Studio album by Martin Stephenson and the Daintees
- Released: 1 October 2012
- Genre: British rock/folk/pop
- Label: Barbaraville Records
- Producer: Martin Stephenson/Mark Lough

Martin Stephenson and the Daintees chronology
Western Eagle (2008)	California Star (2012)	Haunted Highway (2015)

California Star is the 2012 album from Martin Stephenson and the Daintees.

== Track listing ==
All songs written and arranged by Martin Stephenson, except track 11 written by Helen McCookerybook.

1. 'The Ship' - 04:42
2. 'The Streets Of San Sebastian' - 04:24
3. 'Power That Is Greater' - 02:45
4. 'California Star' - 03:24
5. 'Ready To Move On' - 03:11
6. 'Boy To Man' - 03:43
7. 'Something Special' - 03:40
8. 'Silverbird' - 04:29
9. 'Long Way To Go' - 03:31
10. 'Sweet Cherwine' - 02:17
11. 'I'm In Love For The First Time' - 03:41

== Personnel ==
- Martin Stephenson – Lead Vocals, Guitars
- John Steel - Guitars, Keyboards
- Kate Stephenson – Drums
- Helen McCookerybook - Backing Vocals
- Ally Macleod - Backing Vocals
- Jill Hepburn - Backing Vocals
- Stevie Smith - Harmonica
- Kenny Brady - Fiddle, Mandolin
