= The Lighthouse (Ana da Silva album) =

Studio album by Ana da Silva
- Released: 21 February 2005
- Recorded: 2004
- Label: Chicks on Speed
- Producer: Ana da Silva

The Lighthouse is the first solo album by Ana da Silva of the Raincoats, released on 21 February 2005 on the Chicks on Speed label.

The first new music from da Silva since the Raincoats' 1996 album Looking in the Shadows, The Lighthouse was written and recorded by da Silva alone in her flat using a Yamaha QY70 sequencer and a Roland 8-track digital recorder, except "Modinha", which was recorded with Stuart Moxham (of Young Marble Giants) at his house, originally for a tribute album to Antônio Carlos Jobim.

The album received a positive review from CMJ New Music Monthly, with Kory Grow saying the album "drips with traditionally tuneful beauty and stunning electro-innovation". Spin gave the album an A− rating, called it "utterly seductive", commenting on "lovely, lulling, ticktock keyboard backdrops...for her exquisite chorales about disco balls and the cold winds." Heather Phares, reviewing the album for Allmusic, gave it a 4-star review, calling it "striking and pure".

Critics drew comparisons with Björk and Pram.

== Track listing ==
All songs by da Silva, except "Modinha" (Antônio Carlos Jobim).

1. "Friend"
2. "Two Windows over the Wings"
3. "Running in the Rain"
4. "The Lighthouse"
5. "Hospital Window"
6. "Modinha"
7. "In Awe of a Painting"
8. "Sister"
9. "Disco Ball"
10. "Climbing Walls"
