= Sensuality (song) =

Single by Lovestation

from the album Soulsation
- Released: 1998
- Genre: R&B, house, garage
- Length: 3:37
- Label: Fresh Records
- Songwriter(s): Dave Morgan, Ronni Simon, Vicky Aspinall
- Producer(s): Lovestation

Lovestation singles chronology
"Teardrops" (1998)	"Sensuality" (1998)	"Teardrops (reissue)" (2000)

"Sensuality" is a song by British group Lovestation, released as a single in 1998. The song peaked at No. 16 in the UK, giving the group their second top 20 hit, after "Teardrops" (No. 14). It appears on their debut album Soulsation, released in 2000.

== Track listings ==
UK 12"
A1. "Sensuality" (Classic 12" Mix) - 6:03
A2. "Sensuality" (Lovestation Future Funk Mix) - 6:15
B1. "Sensuality" (Industry Standard Mix) - 5:41
B2. "Teardrops" (Curtis and Moore Remix) - 6:35

UK CD maxi-single

1. "Sensuality" (Lovestation Classic 7" Mix) - 3:46
2. "Sensuality" (Lovestation Future Funk Mix) - 6:24
3. "Teardrops" (Curtis and Moore Remix) - 6:36

== Charts ==
Chart (1998)	Peak position
UK Singles Chart	16
Scottish Singles Chart	39
