= Trouble (Gina Birch album) =

Studio album by Gina Birch
- Released: July 11, 2025
- Length: 54:09
- Label: Third Man
- Producers: Gina Birch; Youth

Gina Birch chronology
I Play My Bass Loud (2021)	Trouble (2025)

Singles from Trouble
- 1. "Causing Trouble Again" Released: 8 May 2025

Trouble is the second studio album by English musician and filmmaker Gina Birch. It was released on 11 July 2025 via Third Man Records in LP, CD and digital formats. It was preceded by Birch's debut full-length project, I Play My Bass Loud of 2023. The lead single "Causing Trouble Again" was released on 8 May 2025, alongside a music video directed by Birch and Dean Chalkley.

== Reception ==
Professional ratings
Review scores
Source	Rating
AllMusic	3/5 stars
Louder Than War	5/5 stars
MusicOMH	3.5/5 stars

The album received 8 out of 10 in Mojo magazine

Trouble - 8 out of 10 in Uncut magazine

AllMusic reviewer Mark Deming noted, "Trouble leaves no doubt that she's rabble rousing for the right reasons, and making compelling music at the same time."

MusicOMH, rating the album three and a half stars, remarked, "It wears its heart on its sleeve, and is relentlessly inventive. It's the sound of an artist continuing to evolve whilst encouraging anyone who is lucky enough to encounter their work to follow suit."

It was rated five stars by Louder Than War's Wayne Carey, who described it as "another fine album of weird and wonderful that isn't easy listening at first yet grows and grows. A masterpiece of modern art for the adventurous music lovers."

== Track listing ==
No.	Title	Writer(s)	Length
1.	"I Thought I'd Live Forever"	Gina Birch; Martin Glover; Helen McCallum	5:03
2.	"Happiness"	Birch	5:12
3.	"Causing Trouble Again"	Birch; Marie Merlet; Jules Tolchard	6:11
4.	"Cello Song"	Birch; Jenny Green	4:28
5.	"Keep to the Left"	Birch	4:46
6.	"Doom Monger"	Birch	4:42
7.	"Don't Fight Your Friends"	Birch; Glover	4:23
8.	"Nothing Will Ever Change That"	Birch; Merlet	4:06
9.	"Hey Hey"	Birch; Green	4:37
10.	"Sleep"	Birch	4:42
11.	"Train Platform"	Birch; Merlet	5:59
Total length:			54:09

== Personnel ==
Credits adapted from Tidal.

- Gina Birch – lead vocals, production (all tracks); electric bass guitar (tracks 1, 3–6, 9, 11), synthesizer (2)
- Youth – production (all tracks), keyboards (1), harmonium (2), electric guitar (4, 5), electric bass guitar (7)
- Helen McCookerybook – background vocals (1, 7)
- Jenny Cook – background vocals (1)
- Marie Merlet – background vocals (2, 3, 6, 7, 11), drums (2, 3), tambourine (2), synthesizer (8, 11), melodica (9)
- Jenny Green – background vocals (3, 9), electric guitar (3)
- Natasha Briant – cello (4)
