= Gladsome, Humour & Blue =

Studio album by Martin Stephenson and the Daintees
- Released: 4 April 1988
- Genre: British rock/folk/pop
- Length: 46:38
- Label: Kitchenware Records
- Producer: Paul Samwell Smith

Martin Stephenson and the Daintees chronology
Boat to Bolivia (1986)	Gladsome, Humour & Blue (1988)	Salutation Road (1990)

Singles from Gladsome, Humour & Blue
- 1. "There Comes a Time"; 2. "Wholly Humble Heart"

Gladsome, Humour & Blue is the second album from Martin Stephenson and the Daintees.

== Track listing ==
All songs written and composed by Martin Stephenson.

1. "There Comes A Time" - 04:08
2. "Slaughterman" - 04:01
3. "The Wait" - 03:51
4. "I Can See" - 05:08
5. "The Old Church is Still Standing" - 02:53
6. "Even The Night" - 03:43
7. "Wholly Humble Heart" - 05:20
8. "Me and Mathew" - 03:49
9. "Nancy" - 03:46
10. "Goodbye John" - 03:46
11. "I Pray" - 06:13

== Personnel ==
- Martin Stephenson – lead vocals, guitars
- Anthony Dunn – bass
- Paul Smith – drums
- Gary Dunn - lead guitar
- Mickey Watson - keyboards, saxophone
- Sherryl Parker - backing vocals
- Sheila Parker - backing vocals
- Pandit Dinesh - percussion
- Anne Stephenson - violin
- Virginia Astley - flute, backing vocals
