= Lovestation =

British musical group

- Origin: London, England
- Genres: House, UK garage
- Years active: 1992–present
- Labels: Fresh Records
- Members: Dave Morgan; Vicky Aspinall

Lovestation are a British electronic dance music group formed by Vicky Aspinall in 1989, who subsequently worked with co-producer David Morgan. Gospel singer-songwriter Lisa Hunt has also appeared on several Lovestation records. Active throughout the 1990s, they released their sole debut album, Soulsation in 2000, containing '90s hits such as "Love Come Rescue Me", "Shine on Me" and "Best of My Love". They are best known for their cover of Womack & Womack's "Teardrops", which reached No. 14 on the UK Singles Chart.

== History ==
In 1992, Aspinall and Morgan founded the independent dance label Fresh Records (no relation to the post-punk label of the same name), initially for their own Lovestation releases. The releases "Shine on Me" and "Best of My Love" were very popular in the clubs. Lovestation caught the music industry's attention in 1995 with their house classic "Love Come Rescue Me". Originally released in 1992, a re-release two years later in 1994 gave the song a moderate charting of #42 on the UK Singles Chart in early 1995. It wasn't till 1998 when the group had major success with a UK garage cover of Womack & Womack's 1988 hit "Teardrops" which reached #14 in the UK. Another single from 1998, "Sensuality", also made the UK top 20, peaking at #16.

== Discography ==
=== Studio albums ===
Title	Album details
Soulsation	Released: 2000; Label: Fresh Records

=== Singles ===
Year	Title	Peak chart positions							Album
Year	Title	UK	AUS	GER	NED	SCO	SWI	US Dance	Album
1992	"Love Come Rescue Me"	—	—	—	—	—	—	—	Soulsation
1992	"Shine on Me"	—	—	—	—	—	—	—	Soulsation
1992	"Reachout"	—	—	—	—	—	—	—	Non-album single
1993	"Shine on Me" (1st reissue)	71	—	—	—	—	—	—	Soulsation
1993	"Best of My Love"	73	—	—	—	—	—	—	Soulsation
1994	"Shine on Me" (2nd reissue)	93	—	—	—	—	—	—	Soulsation
1995	"Love Come Rescue Me" (1st reissue)	42	—	—	—	52	—	—	Soulsation
1997	"Love Come Rescue Me" (2nd reissue)	91	—	—	—	—	—	—	Soulsation
1998	"Teardrops"	14	49	66	52	33	47	10	Soulsation
1998	"Teardrops" (import)	95	—	—	—	—	—	—	Soulsation
1998	"Sensuality"	16	—	—	—	39	—	—	Soulsation
2000	"Teardrops" (1st reissue)	24	—	—	—	27	—	—	Soulsation
"—" denotes items that did not chart or were not released in that territory.
