= The Chefs =

English indie pop/punk band

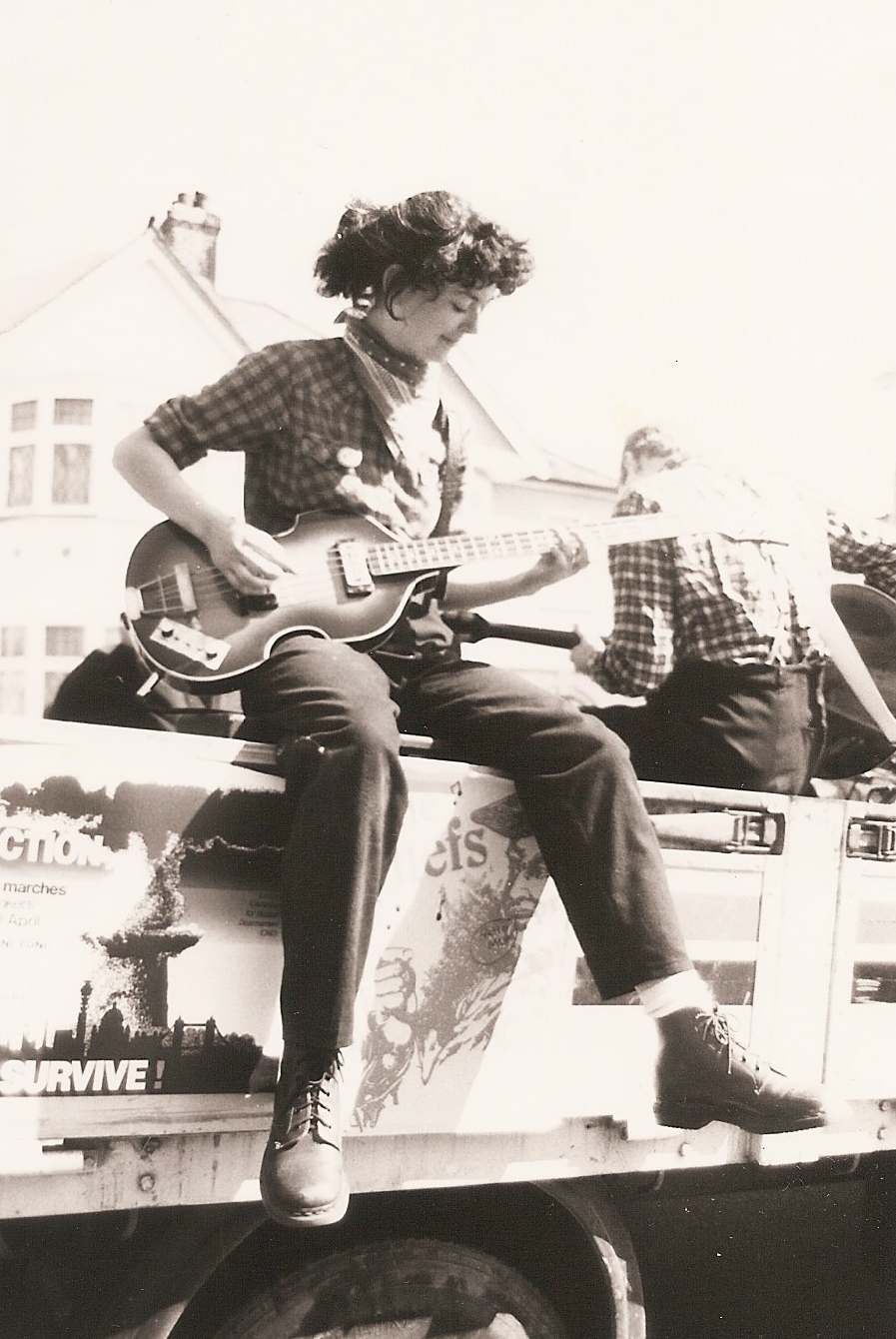
The Chefs playing on the back of a truck during a CND march through South London, April 1981

The Chefs were an English indiepop/post-punk band which formed in Brighton in 1979, relocating to London in 1981, and finally splitting up in 1982. The band consisted of Helen McCookerybook (bass guitar and vocals), Carl Evans (guitar and vocals), James McCallum (guitar; died 2 June 2025) and Russell Greenwood (drums; died 25 June 1999).

== Punk beginnings ==
In 1976, Helen McCallum moved from Wylam near Newcastle-upon-Tyne to Brighton to study fine art printmaking at Brighton Polytechnic. In 1977, she began to play bass in the punk band Joby and the Hooligans. The following year, Carl Evans, a 17-year-old guitarist from Haywards Heath, joined the band, and they changed their name to the Smartees. In the Smartees, McCallum wrote and sang "Thrush", a song about the sexually transmitted disease. Her second song, written with singer Tracy Preston, was "Let's Make Up", about cosmetics.

== Formation ==
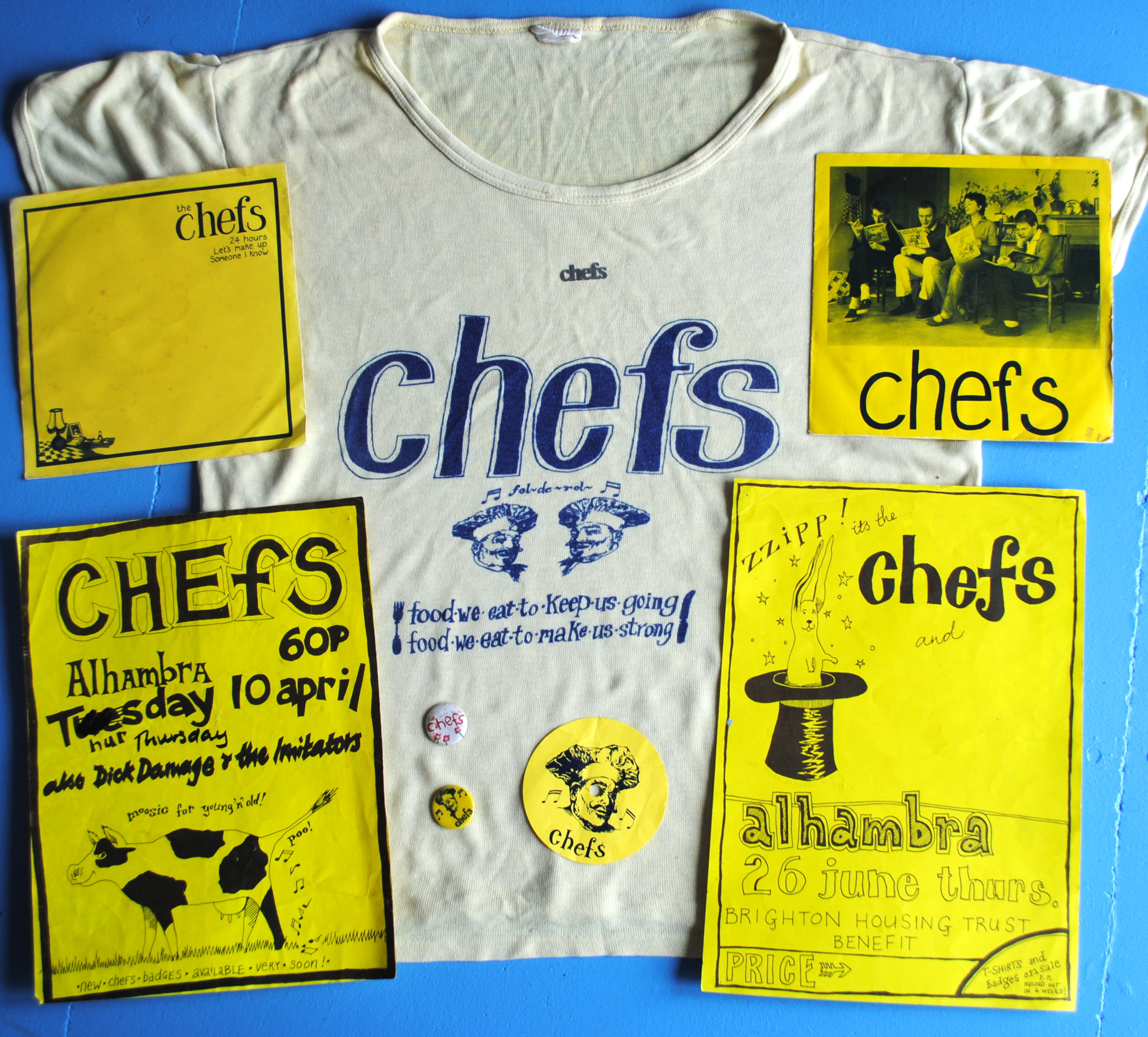
Chefs t-shirt and other ephemera, designed by Helen McCookerybook

After the Smartees split in late 1978, McCallum and Evans began to write songs together. McCallum had drawn an illustration of a dancing chef, called Ken Wood, with an accompanying rhyme, "Food". This was a list of favourite foods, with the refrain "Food we eat to keep us going/ Food we eat to make us strong/ In our bellies we are stowing/ Eating eating all day long." Evans set this to music, giving them their first song, and a name for the band, the Chefs.

Evans and McCallum went on to write "Boasting", another list song, in which they sang alternate verses describing their favourite possessions: McCallum’s pet goldfish and canvass shoes, and Evans' blue mini car, pair of pointed crepes and 10-inch Whirlwind record. A third song was made up of the simple lyric, "We’re the Chefs, how do you do? We have come to play for you." All three songs were under two minutes long and McCallum later recalled that their first gig "lasted about five minutes, with between song chat".

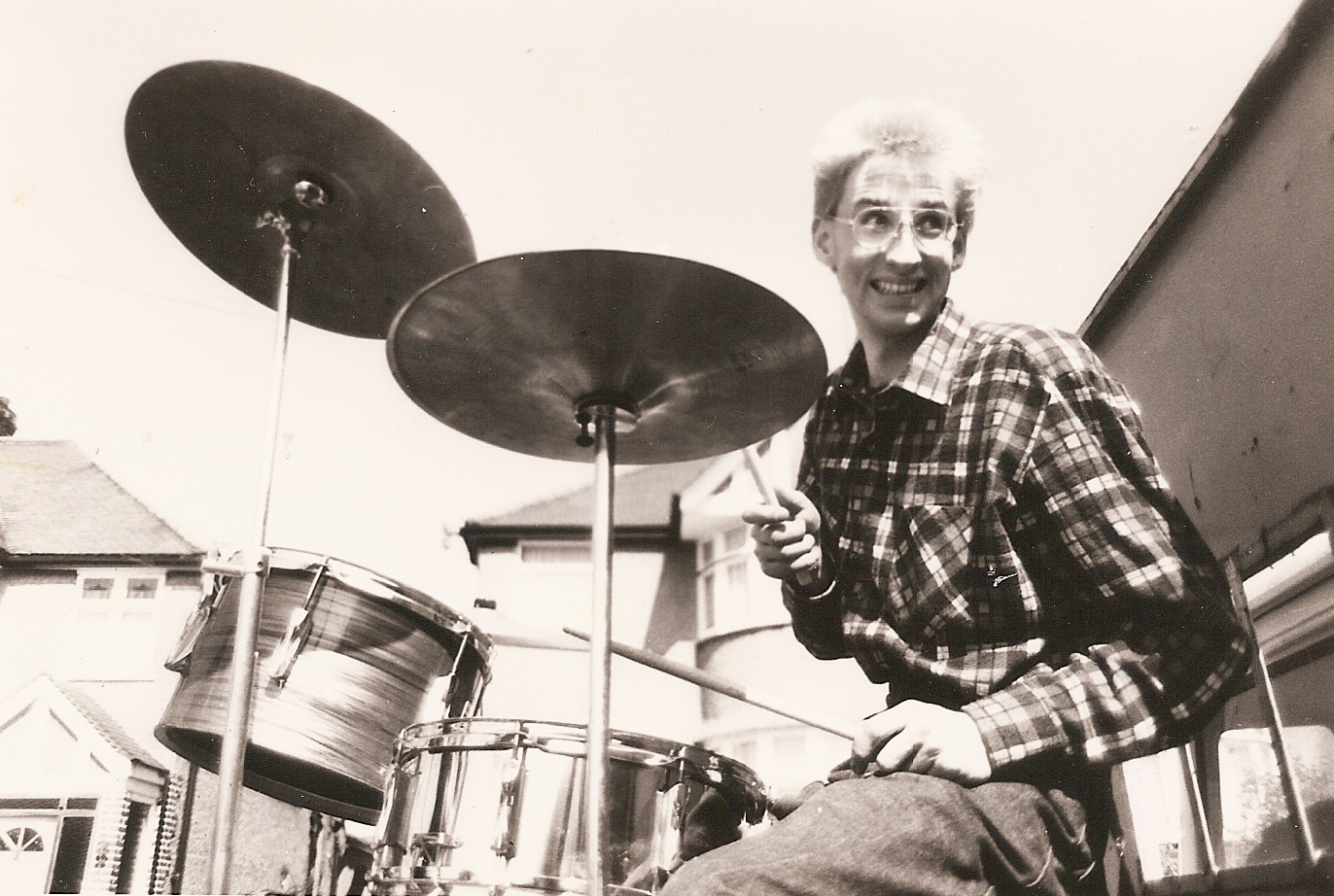
Russ Greenwood, drummer of the Chefs, April 1981

In 1979, the Chefs, with 'Muttley' on drums, contributed two songs, "Food", and Carl's "You Get Everywhere", to Vaultage 79, a compilation produced by Brighton's independent record label, Attrix. The local newspaper, the Evening Argus, organised a photo shoot with all the Attrix bands standing outside the record label's shop in Sydney Street. When the photographer asked McCallum her name, she told him, on the spur of the moment, that it was "McCookerybook". The name stuck.

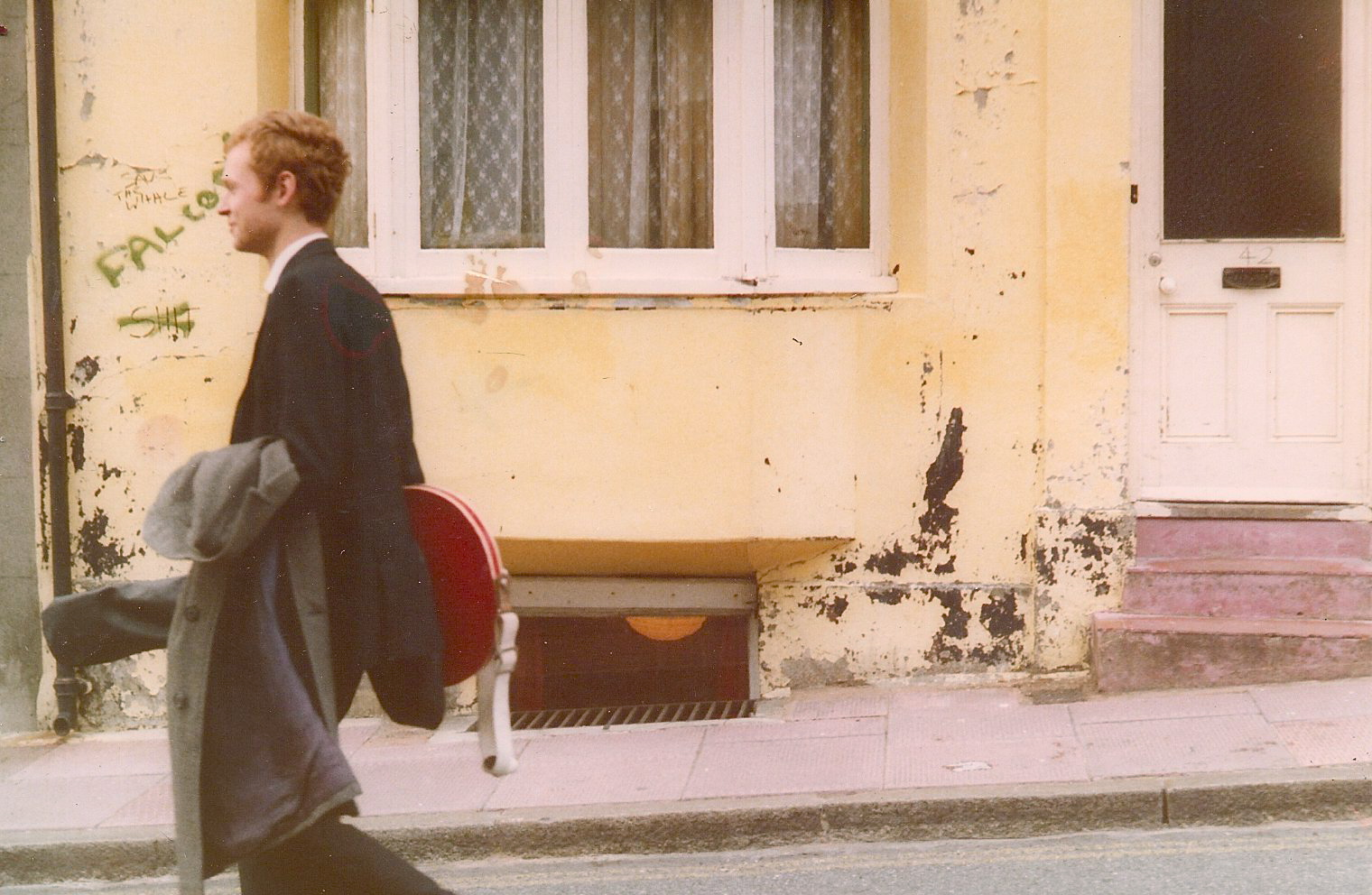
James McCallum, Chefs guitarist, setting off from his house for a band rehearsal in Brighton, May 1980

Soon after, McCallum's brother, James, joined on second guitar. He had recently finished a degree in philosophy at Sussex University, and had played guitar in the short lived punk band, Smeggy and the Cheesybits (Smeggy would go on to be lead singer in King Kurt). The line-up was completed in early 1980 with the arrival of Russ Greenwood, who had been drummer in the Parrots. Greenwood, a powerful dynamic drummer, brought a new tightness and professionalism to the band.

In 1980, Attrix paid for a Chefs EP, which was recorded at Graphic Studios in London. It included "Thrush", "Boasting", "Records and Tea" and Evans' love song "Sweetie", a live favourite. The EP came in a yellow sleeve, designed by McCallum. Yellow, the Chefs' favourite colour, was used for posters, t-shirts, stickers and badges. John Peel loved the EP, and played it repeatedly on his late night BBC Radio 1 show.

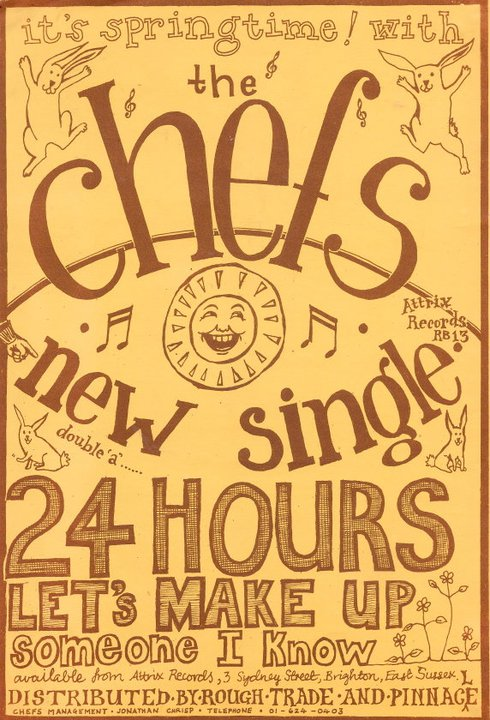
1981 poster, by Helen McCookerybook, advertising "24 Hours"

== In London ==
To break into the music business, in 1981, the band all moved to Kilburn in North West London. In April and May 1981, they performed a Monday-night residency at the Moonlight Club at the Railway pub in West Hampstead.

In April 1981, Attrix released a Chefs' single, McCallum's "24 Hours". It was a song about romantic obsession, and the gulf between real life and fantasy: ‘I know if I catch you it might turn out/That it's not as much fun as I'd hoped that it would be/ ‘Cause wishing and waiting it what it's all about/ And dreams are worth ten times more than reality.’ McCallum described "24 Hours" as an 'attempt to write a song that sounded like Donna Summer', and said that it was a true story: 'I fell in love with a fat scaffolder'. On the other side, there was Evans' song "Someone I Know".

The Chefs' first John Peel session, broadcast on 11 May 1981, included Evans' "Love Is Such a Splendid Thing" and McCallum’s "Northbound Train". Like "24 Hours", these new songs showed a movement away from the nursery rhyme lyrics of the early recordings to more sophisticated songs about relationships. There was also "One Fine Day", with music by Evans and lyrics by James McCallum, posing a list of comically absurd questions within the song.

In the summer of 1981, the Chefs also recorded McCallum's song, "Locked Out", for the compilation, W.N.W.6 Moonlight Radio, released by Armageddon Records.

It was hard to label the Chefs' music. McCallum told Sounds, 'People keep asking us what sort of music we play but we can't tell them. It's not directly influenced by anything – we all like listening to different sorts of music, and each of us, in our heads I think, believes we're playing that sort of music.' The Chefs' jangling guitar arrangements and bright pop melodies pointed the way towards the C86 sound, but stood out in the fashion-conscious London of 1981, when the Goths and New Romantics were at their height.

== Graduate ==
The West Midlands label, Graduate, best known for UB40, loved "24 Hours", and signed the Chefs to their label, re-releasing the single, with "Thrush" as the B side. There were plans to make an album, and the Chefs recorded nine songs at Alvic Studios in West Kensington, in a session produced by Mike Robinson and Richard Preston. Interviewed in 2013, McCallum described the recordings as "very drum-heavy as the drummer got into tribal drums after hearing Adam and the Ants. I did love Adam and the Ants' sound but I didn't want to be them. I think that might be why The Chefs split up; I'd always thought we thrived on being original but the others seemed to want to fit into pop fashion.' The Chefs also resisted Graduate's attempts to mould them. In 2012, McCallum told Everett True, 'They tried to get me to wear make-up and girly clothes, but I was a total tomboy and would have felt like a drag queen.'

== Skat ==
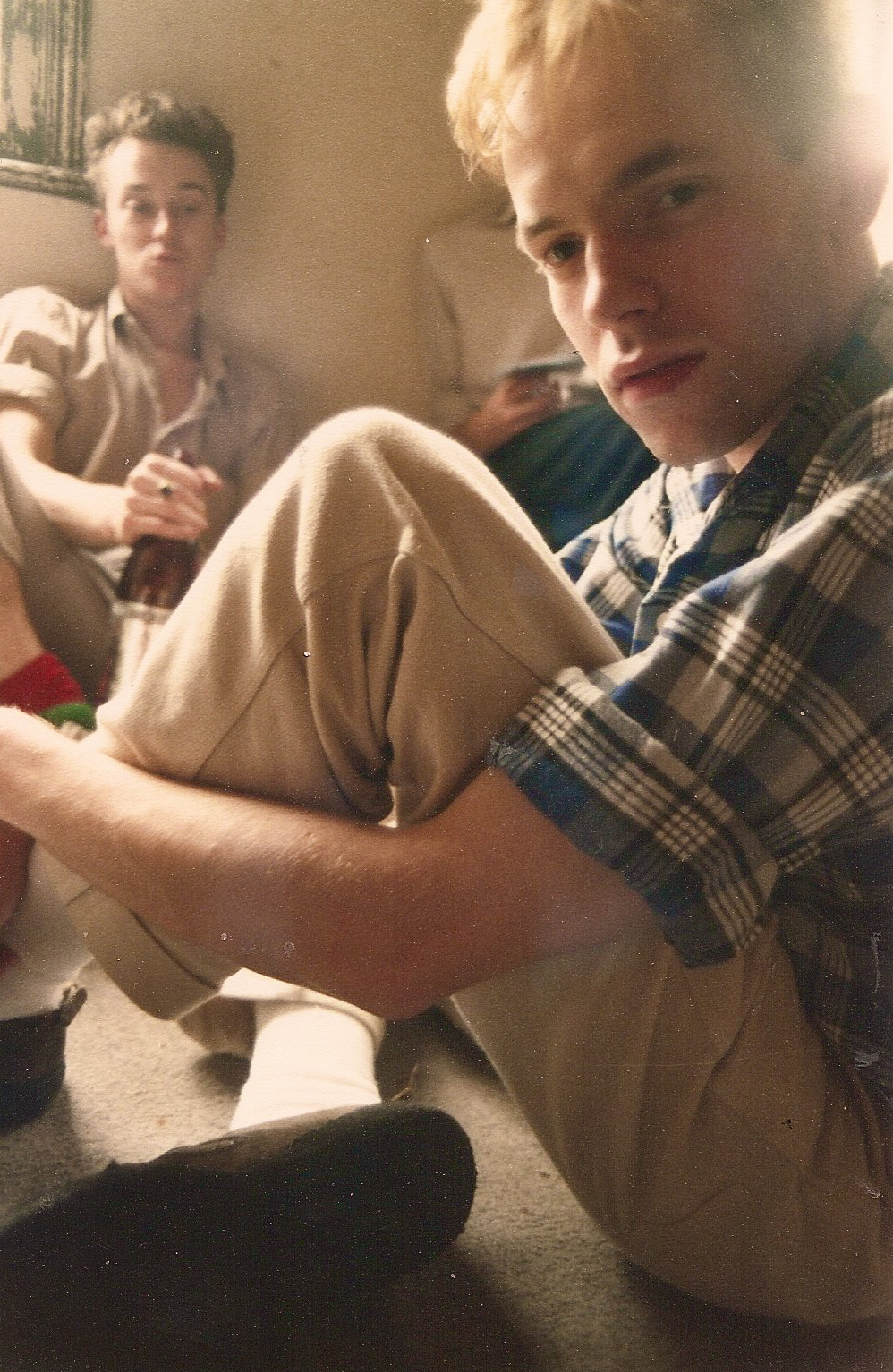
Carl Evans in Kilburn, August 1982, soon after the Chefs split up

In early 1982, the band changed their name to Skat, a name which proved unpopular. McCallum told Everett True, 'Not my idea to change the name. Even my Dad said it was silly commercial suicide. As Skat, the band played a final John Peel session, broadcast on 10 March 1982. These last recordings were darker in tone. McCallum's "Sad Boy Style" was a song about deception in a love triangle. "Love, It Is Just a Word", the last song that McCallum and Evans wrote together, was about the end of a relationship and disillusion with love. Skat also released a single, a cover version of "Femme Fatale" by The Velvet Underground.

Greenwood was the first to leave the band in 1982, eventually joining John Hegley as one of the Popticians. With Bron Buick as drummer, Skat "limped through a final few more gigs before calling it a day". Evans went on to form the cowpunk band, Yip Yip Coyote, writing pop songs influenced by club beats and spaghetti western music. Like Evans, McCallum also wore western clothes, but her new band, Helen and the Horns, was closer to jazz and country music. James McCallum left the music business to retrain as a lawyer.

== Legacy ==
Although they never found commercial success, the Chefs had a lasting impact on those who heard them. Martin Stephenson of the Daintees has said, 'We were very influenced by The Chefs. To me [McCallum] is a national treasure.'

In 2012, Damaged Goods released Records and Tea, a compilation of the band's Attrix recordings and Richard Skinner and John Peel sessions. Reviewing the collection for the eMusic website, Andrew Gibson concluded, "The Chefs' lively mixture of fun and social acuity might easily leave them forever chained to their age, were it not for the sheer quality of their tunes....Like the Smiths and countless ensuing indie-pop heroes...The Chefs turned forlorn emotions and humdrum surroundings into triumphant music."

In 2022, Optic Nerve recordings reissued "24 Hours", as a yellow vinyl single, in its original yellow Attrix cover with a poster and a postcard. Ian McCann reviewed the release in Record Collector magazine: "I feel love. I feel love. I feel love etc. "24 Hours" echoes Donna Summer's top/terrifying tune, borrowing the bassline, even utilising its change from major to minor. But Brighton's The Chefs aren't disco devils. This is joyous, melodic, thrashy proto-indie, ahead of its time in 1981. "Let's Make Up" is even better, a ringing driving din that casts Helen McCookerybook (I'm not making this up, she is) as a habitual user of Superdrug's slap shelves. They play in waltz time on "Someone I know", mocking the whispering of gossip, the snarky online messaging of their era. A dazzlingly brilliant EP, its vinyl matches its sunny sleeve."

In 2024, more than 40 years after the Chefs recorded the Alvic sessions, their 'lost album' was finally released by Damaged Goods, as part of a vinyl double LP compilation: Records & Tea: The Best of The Chefs and Lost Second (sic) Album. Alongside five songs familiar from Peel sessions, there were four previously unreleased compositions: Evans's "Lucky Hello" and "Land Ho" (a reworking of "Love is Such a Splendid Thing"), and McCookerybook's "Commander Lonely" and "Baby Small".

== The Pop Up Chefs ==
On 25 January 2023, Helen McCookerybook and James McCallum reunited to play duo guitar arrangements of Chefs songs at the Betsey Trotwood pub in Clerkenwell, London. They played "Food", "Let's make up", "Records and Tea", and "24 Hours". Their set was filmed and was posted by McCookerybook on YouTube.

As the Pop Up Chefs, in 2025 they released an EP, Extended Play, with the new stripped down versions of the four songs, on Gare du Nord records.

== Discography ==
Sweetie – guitar solo, played by Carl Evans
An audio sample of the guitar solo from "Sweetie" (1980)

=== Albums/compilations/Eps ===
- 1979: Vaultage '79 (Another Two Sides of Brighton) ("You Get Everywhere"/"Food") - 12-inch LP, Attrix Records
- 1980: Chefs ("Sweetie"/ "Thrush"/ "Records and Tea"/ "Boasting") - 7-inch EP, Attrix
- 1981: WNW6 – Moonlight Radio/Locked Out - 12-inch LP, Armageddon Records
- 1982: Fear and Fantasy/I'll Go Too - 12-inch LP, Armageddon
- 1997: Vaultage Punk Collection ("Sweetie"/"Thrush"/"24 Hours"/"Let's Make Up") - CD, Anagram
- 2005: Helen McCookerybook ("24 Hours"/"Femme Fatale") (Graduate recording) - CD, Near Shore Records
- 2012: Records and Tea: The Best of the Chefs - CD, Damaged Goods
- 2020: Make More Noise: Women In Independent UK Music 1977-1987 ("Food") - 4 CDs, Cherry Red Records
- 2021: The Sun Shines Here: The Roots Of Indie Pop 1980-1984 ("Sweetie") - 3 CDs, Cherry Red Records
- 2024: Records & Tea: The Best of The Chefs and Lost Second Album - Double Vinyl LP Damaged Goods
- 2025: The Pop Up Chefs: Extended Play ("24 Hours", "Food", "Let's Make Up" "Records and Tea") - 7 inch EP Gare du Nord

=== Singles ===
- 1981: "24 Hours"/"Let's Make Up"/"Someone I Know" - 7-inch single, Attrix
- 1980: "24 Hours"/"Thrush" - 7-inch single, Graduate Records
- 1982: "Femme Fatale"/"One Fine Day" - 7-inch single (as "Skat"), Graduate
- 2022: "24 Hours"/"Let's Make Up"/"Someone I Know" - 7-inch single, Optic Nerve Recordings
