= Audrey Golden =

American writer

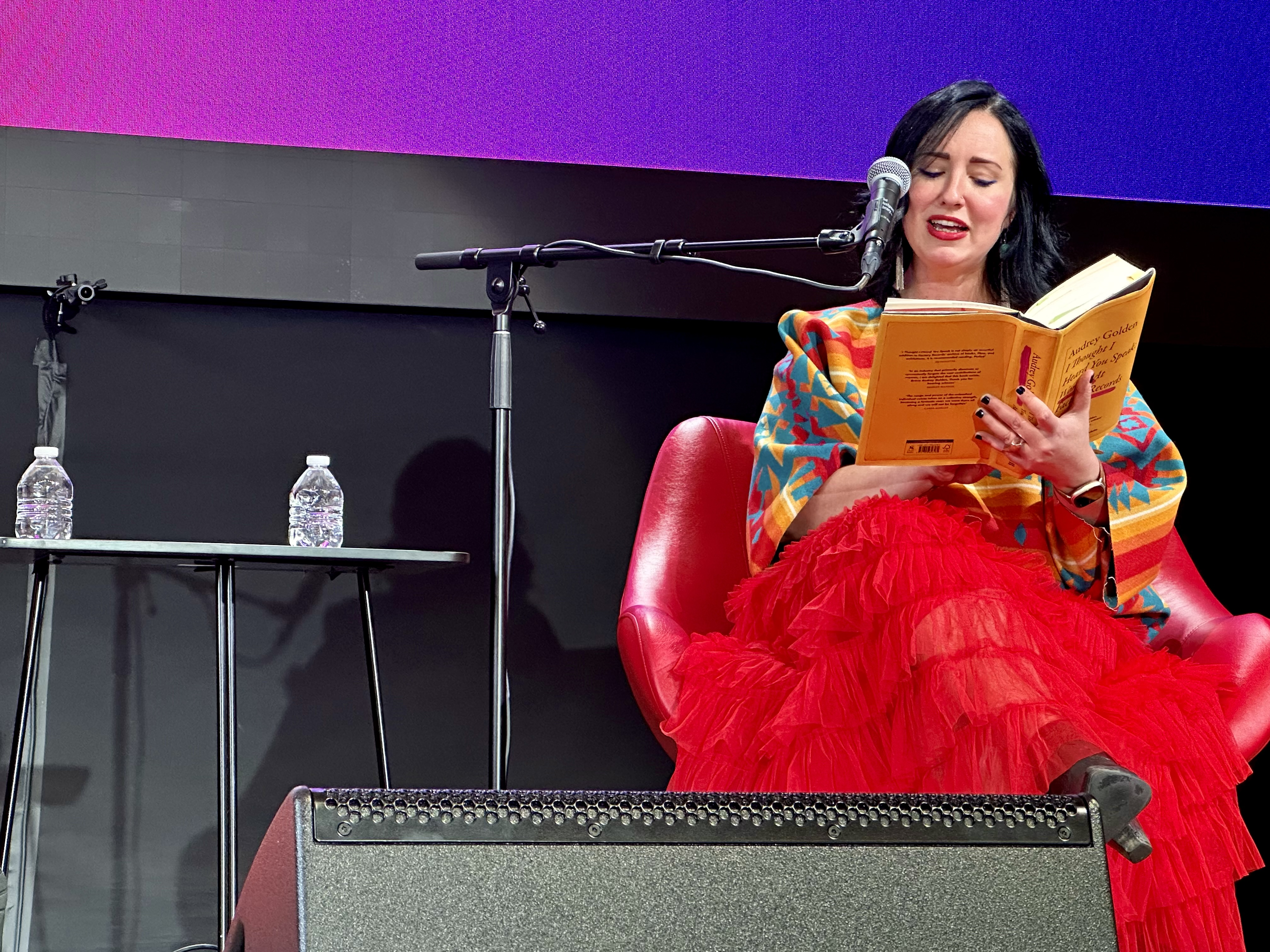
- Education: Wesleyan University, Wake Forest University School of Law, University of Virginia
- Occupation: Writer
- Website: www.audreyjgolden.com

Audrey Golden is an American writer, journalist, lecturer, and radio presenter. She is a contributing editor at Louder Than War, and her writing has been featured in Maggot Brain (Third Man), The Quietus, Rolling Stone, The Guardian, The Wire, DIVA magazine, American Book Review, The Irish Times, The Herald, Crack Magazine, Antipodes, and the International League of Antiquarian Booksellers. She is station manager of Louder Than War Radio, where she also presents the show "Breaking Glass" that highlights the work of women in the music industry.

== Early life and education ==
Golden was raised up and down the Eastern Seaboard from Connecticut to Florida, and she received a BA in film studies from Wesleyan University, JD from Wake Forest University School of Law, and PhD in literary studies from the University of Virginia.

== Work ==
Golden's work focuses on music, politics, and popular culture.

I Thought I Heard You Speak: Women At Factory Records, her first book, was an oral history that centers the voices of women in the story of the legendary Factory Records. It was published in the UK by White Rabbit in May 2023 and released in the US in February 2024. I Thought I Heard You Speak was named a Rough Trade Book of the Year 2023 and was longlisted for the 2024 Penderyn Prize.

Golden's second book, Shouting Out Loud: Lives of The Raincoats is a biography of feminist punk band The Raincoats, published in 2025 by Da Capo in the United States and White Rabbit in the United Kingdom. Shouting Out Loud was named a Telegraph Book of the Year and a Rough Trade Book of the Year in 2025.

Her book Queercore for the 33 1/3 Genre Series was published in June 2026.

As a legal and cultural studies scholar, Golden has lectured on a range of topics from contemporary cinema to public writing. She has given seminars at the Coolidge Corner Theatre and taught at several universities. Her work as an archivist and rare book collector has been honored by the Library of Congress. She is currently writing We Won't Go Quietly: Rock for Choice and the Sonic History of Abortion Activism, forthcoming from Beacon Press.

== Bibliography ==
=== Books ===
- I Thought I Heard You Speak: Women At Factory Records. White Rabbit, 2023. ISBN 978-1-3996-0618-9
- Shouting Out Loud: Lives of The Raincoats. Da Capo/White Rabbit, 2025. ISBN 978-0-306-83590-2
- Queercore. Genre: A 33 1/3 Series. Bloomsbury, 2026. ISBN 979-8-7651-2585-4
