= Boat to Bolivia =

Boat To Bolivia

Studio album by Martin Stephenson and the Daintees
- Released: May 1986
- Genre: British rock/folk/pop
- Label: Kitchenware Records
- Producer: Gil Norton

Martin Stephenson and the Daintees chronology
Boat To Bolivia (1986)	Gladsome, Humour & Blue (1988)

Singles from Boat To Bolivia
- 1. "Crocodile Cryer" Released: 24 June 1986; 2. "Slow Lovin'" Released: August 1986; 3. "Boat To Bolivia" Released: October 1986

Boat to Bolivia is the debut album from Martin Stephenson and the Daintees.

== Track listing ==
All songs written and composed by Martin Stephenson.

1. "Crocodile Cryer" – 4:43
2. "Coleen" – 3:41
3. "Little Red Bottle" – 4:08
4. "Running Water" – 3:09
5. "Tribute to the Late Reverend Gary Davis" – 1:18
6. "Candle in the Middle" – 3:25
7. "Piece of the Cake" – 2:56
8. "Look Down Look Down" – 2:54
9. "Slow Lovin'" – 4:01
10. "Caroline" – 3:16
11. "Rain" – 4:02
12. "Boat to Bolivia" – 4:02 (this track was added to the 1987 version due to "popular demand")

== Personnel ==
- Martin Stephenson – Lead vocals, guitars
- Anthony Dunn – Bass, double bass, acoustic guitar, backing vocals
- Claire Dunn – Backing vocals
- Paul Smith – Percussion
- John Steel - Guitar, harmonica, organ, piano, backing vocals
