= Wanna Buy a Bridge? =

Compilation album by Various artists
- Released: 1980
- Genre: Post-punk
- Length: 45:14
- Label: Rough Trade

Wanna Buy a Bridge? is a 1980 compilation album released by Rough Trade Records, a British record label, in the United States. The album was intended to showcase Rough Trade's lineup to an American audience. The album comprises 14 singles by various Rough Trade artists.

== Reception ==
The New York Times called the album "the best single introduction to the variety and vitality of British 'underground' rock ... Six of the groups include women, and many of them deal in dissonances and rhythmic displacements, but there the similarities end."

In 2013, Tal Rosenberg wrote in Chicago Reader that Wanna Buy a Bridge? "...is probably best known as one of the finest, if not the finest, collection of British postpunk music." AllMusic's Todd Kristel gave the album 4.5 out of 5 stars, concluding that "Overall this may be the best single-album collection assembled of post-punk music." Another favorable review of the album was written by Robert Christgau, who gave it an A and called it "superb".

Mark Richardson of Pitchfork later described the album as a key example of "label comps actually [becoming] classics in their own right:" "I've never heard Wanna Buy a Bridge?, but the fact that I've heard of it, 23 years after its release, speaks to its classic status." Kelefa Sanneh said, "The album was exciting because it captured the moment when the energy of the punk explosion was beginning to disperse, shooting out as screaming chaos and bashful love songs and a dozen other things besides."

Professional ratings
Review scores
Source	Rating
AllMusic	4.5/5 stars
Robert Christgau	A
Sounds	4/5 stars

== Track listing ==
Side one
No.	Title	Performer	Length
1.	"Alternative Ulster"	Stiff Little Fingers	2:43
2.	"Mind Your Own Business"	Delta 5	3:45
3.	"Man Next Door"	The Slits	3:35
4.	"Aerosol Burns"	Essential Logic	2:50
5.	"Part Time Punks"	Television Personalities	2:36
6.	"Read About Seymour"	Swell Maps	1:27
7.	"We Are All Prostitutes"	The Pop Group	3:11

Side two
No.	Title	Performer	Length
1.	"Soldier Soldier"	Spizzenergi	3:48
2.	"Ain't You"	Kleenex	3:02
3.	"Nag Nag Nag"	Cabaret Voltaire	4:32
4.	"In Love"	The Raincoats	3:11
5.	"Final Day"	Young Marble Giants	1:20
6.	"Skank Bloc Bologna"	Scritti Politti	5:54
7.	"At Last I Am Free"	Robert Wyatt	3:20
Total length:			45:14
