= Martin Stephenson and the Daintees =

British band

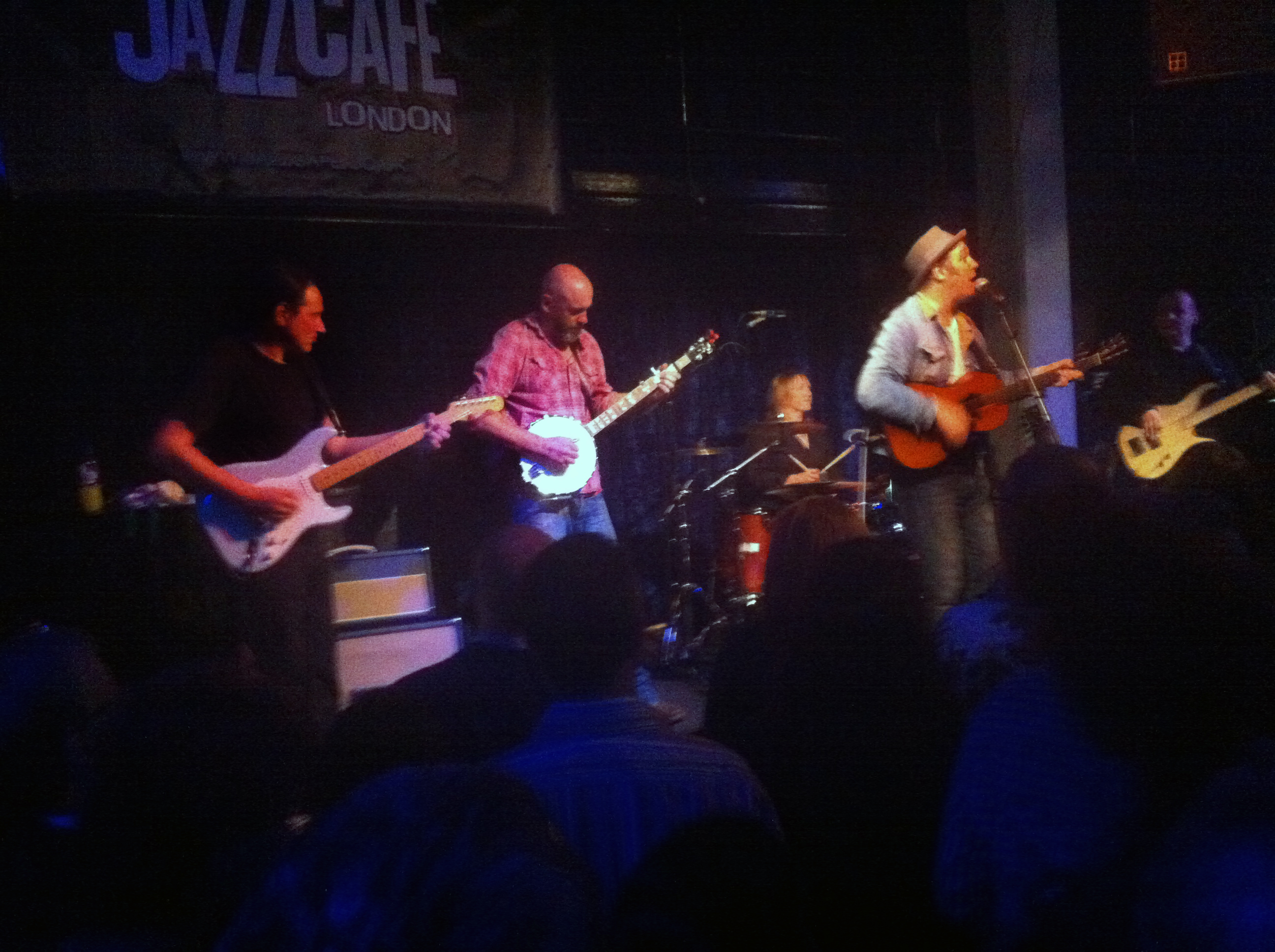
- Martin Stephenson and the Daintees in concert in London (2011)

Background information
- Origin: Sunderland, England
- Genres: Folk-rock, folk
- Years active: 1982–1992, 2000–present
- Labels: Kitchenware, London, Capitol USA, Ramseur, Voiceprint
- Members: Martin Stephenson Anthony Dunn Gary Dunn
- Website: www.daintees.co.uk

Martin Stephenson & the Daintees is a British rock/folk/pop band combining elements of "rockabilly, show tunes, rootsy pop, straight-ahead rock and punk". The band is fronted by songwriter/guitarist Martin Stephenson.

== Career ==
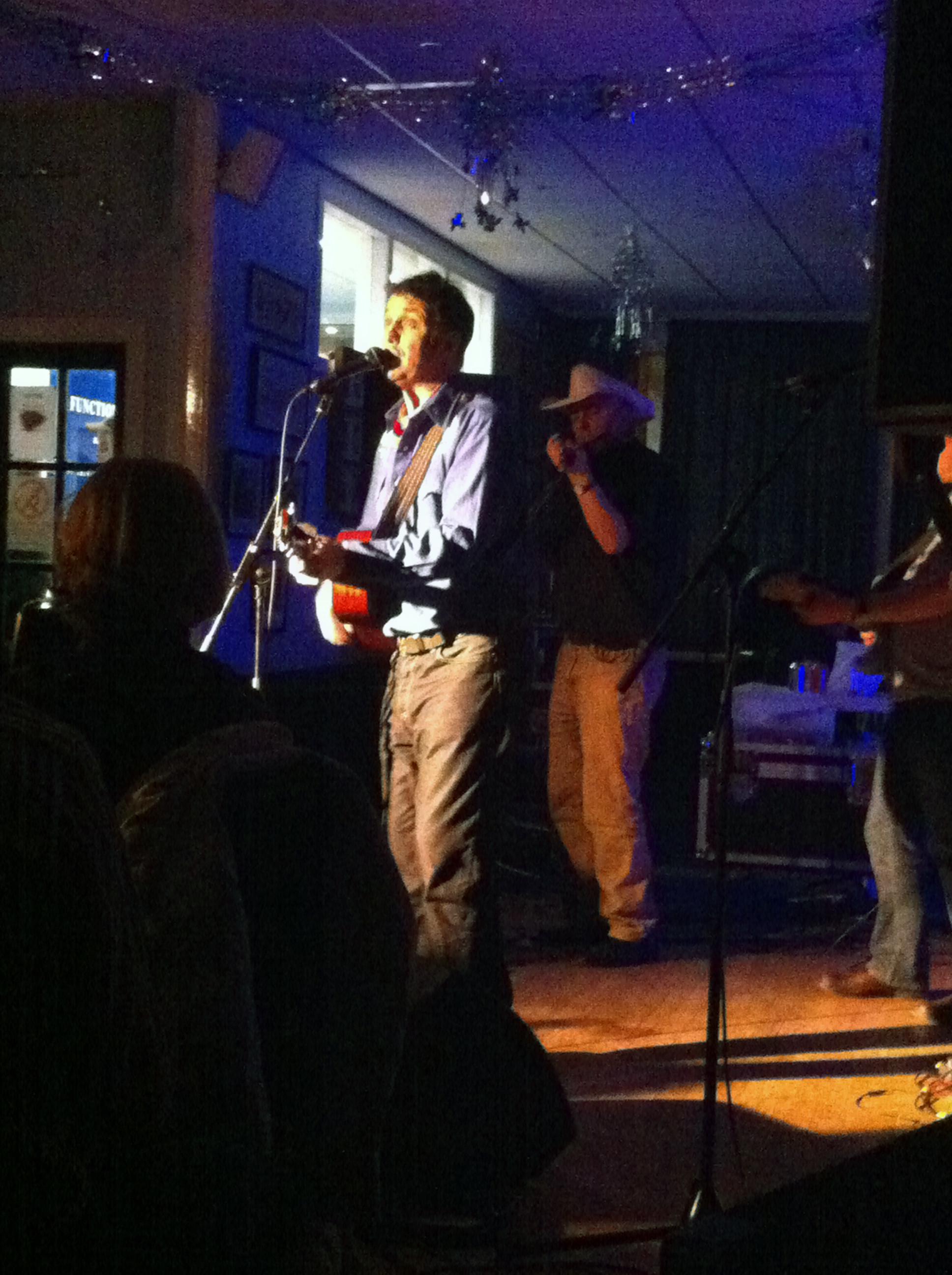
Martin Stephenson and the Daintees in concert in Glasgow (December 2010)

The band was signed to a recording contract with Kitchenware Records and released their first single in 1982. Like other Kitchenware acts the group had its origins in the North East England. The band enjoyed a high critical profile and some minor commercial success. Their best-selling and most acclaimed album is Boat to Bolivia released in 1986. In June 1989, Stephenson took part in that year's Glastonbury Festival. They recorded three further albums – Gladsome, Humour & Blue in 1988, Salutation Road, produced by Pete Anderson, in 1990 and The Boy's Heart in 1992 – but sales fell short of expectations and the band was dropped by their label.

After parting company with Kitchenware, Stephenson disbanded the group in 1992, but continued to record both solo and as part of a group. The Daintees reformed in 2000.

In April 2012, Stephenson completed an eleven-date high-profile tour with The Daintees playing The Boat to Bolivia album in full to critical acclaim. The touring Daintees line up since November 2010 features original guitarist John Steel (Boat to Bolivia/Jackdaw4), John's wife Kate Stephenson (Midge Ure/Sam Brown/Jackdaw4) on drums, and Lou Short (Martin Stephenson 1997/2000) on bass guitar who left the group March 2013.

Daintees have signed a major deal with Absolute music and also have a new agent Neil O'Brien They have remained active in recent years and, in 2018, performed a multi date tour "Gladsome, Humour and Blue 30th Anniversary" tour which culminated in a rapturous reception at the Sage on Tyneside on 8 December that year. This performance was filmed and released on DVD entitled Gladsome 30.

In the same year the actor, comedian and musician Billy Connolly filmed with Stephenson for the two-part documentary about the Glaswegian's life, in which Stephenson performed the track "Rain" and Connolly described him warmly as his idea of a musician and songwriter.

== Martin Stephenson ==
Martin George Stephenson was born on 27 July 1961, to Alfred and Francis Stephenson in Durham. In January 1990, he married Angela Cape who appeared on the cover of the album Boat to Bolivia, though they later divorced. Stephenson has two daughters. Stephenson's work has increasingly drawn on folk music and traditional musical roots, and his performances have often taken in low-key live events and venues for recording. He has recorded albums in a Scottish church and a disused lighthouse. Martin Stephenson currently lives in the highlands of Scotland.

== Martin Stephenson & the Daintees ==
Past & Present Band Members:

- Gary Dunn (Electric Guitar)
- Anth Dunn (Electric Bass Guitar)
- Claire Dunn (Backing Vocals)
- Paul Smith (Percussion)
- John Steel (Guitar, Harmonica, Organ, Piano, Backing Vocals)
- Finn McArdle (Percussion)

== Discography ==
Stephenson's albums have been released on various UK and US labels, including Kitchenware, London, Capitol USA, Floating World Records, Fresh Ear Records, Ramseur, and most recently, his Barbaraville label with Voiceprint.

=== Martin Stephenson and The Daintees albums ===
- Boat to Bolivia (1986)
- Gladsome, Humour & Blue (1988) # 39 UK Albums Chart
- Salutation Road (1990)
- The Boy's Heart (1992)
- Live in the 21st Century (2001)
- Western Eagle (2008)
- Live at Town & Country Club, Camden Town 1990 (2011)
- California Star (2012)
- Haunted Highway (2015)
- Boat to Bolivia 30th Anniversary Edition (new recording) (2016)
- Bayswater Road (2017)
- Gladsome, Humour & Blue 30th Anniversary Edition (new recording) (2018)
- Chi Chi and the Jaguar (2019)
- Salutation Road 30th Anniversary Edition (new recording) (2020)
- The Boy's Heart 30th Anniversary Edition (new recording) (2021)
- Howdy Honcho (2021)
- You Belong To Blue (2023)

=== Compilation albums ===
- There Comes a Time – The Best Of... (1993)

=== With others or solo albums ===
- High Bells Ring Thin (1993)
- Yogi in My House (1995)
- Sweet Misdemeanour (1995)
- Beyond The Leap, Beyond The Law (1997)
- Martin Stephenson (1998)
- When It's Gone, It's Gone (1998)
- Red Man's in Town (1999)
- Songs for the Floating World
- The Lilac Tree (1999)
- The Lilac Tree (different version with alt. recordings and track listing)
- The Church & The Minidisc (2000)
- The Disciples of Merle & Doc (2000)
- The Incredible Shrinking Band (2001)
- Collective Force (2002)
- Down to the Wood (2002)
- The Well of Harmony
- The Haint of the Budded Rose (2003)
- Airdrie (2004)
- Live at Lincoln Cathedral (2005 and DVD)
- Live at The New Roscoe (DVD, 2005)
- Wheel of Fortune (2005)
- Hell's Half Acre (2007)
- High 7 Moon 5 (2007)
- Hamilton Square (2009) (with Helen McCookerybook)
- Beyond Leap (2011)
- Welcome to Scullyville (2011)
- Rock'N'Roll Jamboree (2011) (as Stephenson's Rockets)
- Your Kinda People, My Kinda Folk (2011) (as Martin & Shippy)
- Bolivia (2011) (acoustic versions from "Boat to Bolivia")
- Gladsome (2011) (acoustic versions from "Gladsome, Humour and Blue")
- Salutation Road (2011) (acoustic versions from "Salutation Road")
- Boy's Heart (2011) (acoustic versions from "The Boy's Heart")
- Cafe of Tiny Kindnesses (2012) (with Helen McCookerybook)
- The Skip Sessions (DVD – 2012) (with Gipsy Dave Smith)
- Bolivia (DVD – 2012)
- Surf 7 (2013)
- Brady Square (2019)
- Hybrid Society (2024)

=== Martin Stephenson and The Daintees singles and EPs ===
- "Roll on Summertime" (1982)
- "Trouble Town" (1984)
- "Crocodile Cryer" (1986)
- "Slow Lovin'" (1986)
- Inferno EP (1986)
- "Boat to Bolivia" (1986)
- "There Comes a Time" (1988)
- "Wholly Humble Heart" (1988)
- "Left Us to Burn" (1990)
- "Endurance" (1990)
- "Big Sky New Light" (1992)

The 7" and CD single B-sides from "Big Sky New Light" were the remains of an unreleased solo album at the time, but that album was subsequently released in 1993 as High Bells Ring Thin. In addition, there have been a number of unofficial, but sanctioned releases, through Stephenson's fan community. These comprise old B-sides or live recordings.
