= Shirley O'Loughlin =

British photographer

Shirley O'Loughlin, photographer, is a principal lecturer and course leader of BA (Hons) Photography at the University of Westminster, London, UK. She has worked with The Raincoats since 1978. Her most recent video work The Lighthouse, in collaboration with musician Ana da Silva, was shown at Galeria Ze dos Bois, Lisbon and during the Her Noise show at the South London Gallery in November 2005. She contributed to Chicks on Speed's project "Girl Monster", a compilation of women's cutting-edge music released in 2006.
