= Helen McCookerybook =

British musician and singer-songwriter

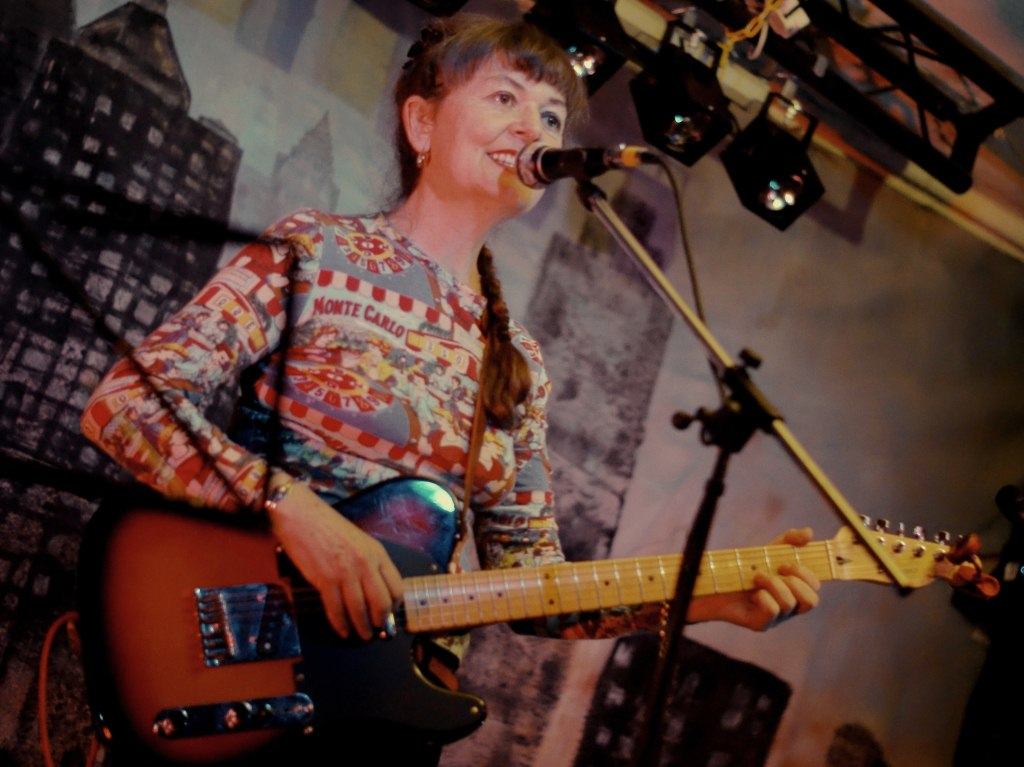
- Helen McCookerybook in 2012

Background information
- Also known as: Helen McCookerybook; Dr Helen Reddington
- Born: Helen McCallum; Newcastle upon Tyne, England
- Occupations: Musician; singer-songwriter; illustrator, lecturer; writer
- Instruments: Guitar; vocals; bass
- Years active: 1977–1987; 2004–present
- Labels: Attrix; Graduate; Thin Sliced; Rockin' Ray; RCA; Barbaraville; Damaged Goods; Big Song; Gare du Nord; Tiny Global
- Member of: Helen McCookerybook (solo); McCookerybook and Rotifer; The Pop-Up Chefs
- Formerly of: Helen and the Horns; The Chefs; Joby and the Hooligans
- Website: mccookerybook.com

Helen McCookerybook (born Helen McCallum, a.k.a. Dr Helen Reddington) is a British musician and singer-songwriter, who was the bass player and co-singer with the Chefs (a Brighton-based punk band), during the late 1970s and early 1980s. She went on to form Helen and the Horns in the mid-1980s. Both bands were admired by John Peel, recording six BBC Radio 1 sessions between them. After a long break from her music career, Helen McCookerybook started again as a solo artist in 2005. She regularly plays live gigs, releases recordings, and promotes occasional revivals of Helen and the Horns.

Her academic career began at the University of Westminster, where she lectured in commercial music, and where she obtained a doctorate. As Dr Helen Reddington, she published The Lost Women of Rock Music: Female Musicians of the Punk Era in July 2007. With Gina Birch (of the Raincoats), she co-produced and co-directed the documentary film Stories from the She-Punks: Music with a different agenda, which was released in 2018. Since 2006 she has lectured at the University of East London, and her second book She's at the Controls: Sound Engineering, Production and Gender Ventriloquism in the 21st Century was published in March 2021.

== Early life ==
McCallum was born in Newcastle General Hospital, Newcastle upon Tyne, to Scottish parents, and was brought up in Wylam, Northumberland. She moved to Brighton to study Fine Art Printmaking, at Brighton Polytechnic, after doing a foundation course in art at Sunderland Polytechnic.

== Music career ==
=== The Chefs ===
Her move to Brighton coincided with the emergence of punk and she joined her first band Joby and the Hooligans in 1978, learning to play the bass in the process. They were mentored by the late Vi Subversa of the Poison Girls, and gained some notoriety on the local scene. The band was short-lived. In 1979 she formed the Chefs with guitarist Carl Evans, later joined by James McCallum on second guitar and Russell Greenwood on drums.

Her pseudonym was acquired after a local journalist called her up for a "punk" name, to be attributed to a photo of all the bands in Brighton at the time. On the spur of the moment she said, "Helen McCookerybook". When the article came out, the headline to the double page spread read "Helen McCookerybook is the one in the back in the hat", and the name stuck.

The Chefs contributed two tracks to Attrix Records' Vaultage 79 (Another Two Sides Of Brighton) compilation album, after which the label released a 4-track EP in 1980. The EP came to the attention of John Peel, who gave it repeated airplay. He invited them to do two Peel Sessions for him (one recorded under the band name Skat). In 1981 the band moved to London, after which Attrix released the single "24 Hours", which was later re-released on Graduate Records. A demo album was recorded for Graduate, but it didn't come to fruition, and the band disbanded in 1982 due to musical differences.

In 2022 Helen and James McCallum, sibling members of the band, started rehearsing together again. In early 2023 they had rearranged, for two guitars and vocals, four of the Chefs songs. They went on to perform two gigs, one in London and the other in Brighton, settling on the name of The Pop-Up Chefs for their musical project. In 2024 they recorded these song arrangements and released a 4-Track EP vinyl record called The Pop-Up Chefs EP on Gare du Nord Records in 2025.

=== Helen and the Horns ===
After a brief break from playing, she met Lester Square (the Monochrome Set) at Cherry Red Records through A&R person Mike Alway, and they worked on her new Western-inspired songs with Mike Slocombe (Urban 75) on drums.

At a gig she met Dave Jago, a trombone player, and recruited him and his friend Paul Davey, on saxophone. McCookerybook couldn't afford to rehearse with a full band, even though Geoff Travis from Rough Trade had financed some demos. The cost of transporting a drum kit proved prohibitive in itself, and so she switched to playing guitar and practised with just the horns. The Monochrome Set then offered them a support at Kingston Polytechnic in their rehearsal set up (vocals, guitar, trombone and saxophone, with no drums or bass), as Helen and the Horns. The performance was a success, and they decided to stick with that format. A trumpet player, Marc Jordan, was added to form a three-piece horn section.

John Peel's producer called McCookerybook to enquire what she was up to and, subsequently, Helen and the Horns' first Peel session was recorded at the BBC's Maida Vale Studios, and broadcast in August 1983. The band went on to tour extensively in the UK and Holland. In 1984, Thin Sliced Records released "Freight Train", which was in the top ten of the indie charts for several weeks. They appeared live on BBC1's Pebble Mill at One, as well as being played on Wogan. After a further Peel session, they signed to RCA Records in 1984 and released two singles with them. Disillusioned with being signed to a major, they got released from their contract after a request from McCookerybook.

Their third Peel session was broadcast in August 1984, with new trumpet player Chris Smith. Their final original release was the self-titled album Helen and the Horns on their own record label, Rockin' Ray Records (distributed by The Cartel), in 1985. Not wanting to become a cabaret band, or to add extra instrumentation, they disbanded amicably. McCookerybook reforms the band occasionally to perform live.

In 2014, Damaged Goods released their three Peel sessions, plus their album, on a CD called Footsteps At My Door: BBC Sessions & More. Helen and the Horns played the launch night at The Lexington, London, in December 2013. With Katy Carr and Honey Birch, they played The Lexington again in 2017. Their last performance was at Brighton's Concorde 2, when they were invited to be part of the Wedding Present's David Gedge's 10th anniversary of At the Edge of the Sea, in 2018.

2023 marked the 40th anniversary of the formation of the band and they reformed to celebrate this live, in the Hope and Anchor, in October.

=== Soundtracks and other activities ===
In the late 1980s she started writing and recording film and video soundtracks, including work for Smith Bundy Video, which was Terry Jones' campaigning video company. In 1990, for the emerging Channel 4, she co-wrote with Lester Square the soundtrack for the controversial documentary about Millwall Football Club, called No-One Likes Us, We Don't Care, sampling the supporters' football chants in the process. They also did the soundtrack for Akiko Hada's film, The Fall of the Queen (or the Taste of Fruit to Come) in 1991.

In 2000, she devised a show called Voxpop Puella. It was a song-cycle, revolving around the seven ages of women, consisting of seven short films that explored those ages. Each film was made by women film-makers and associates that she'd worked with in the past, namely Akiko Hada, Charlotte Worthington, Gail Pearce, Gina Birch, Jane Prophet, Joan Ashworth, and Rachel Davies. McCookerybook provided the soundtracks. It premiered at The Museum of Emotions on London's South Bank. With a grant from the Arts Council of England, it toured (with Gina Birch's Headspace) from Cornwall to Tyne and Wear, culminating with a short run at the Edinburgh Fringe.

In 2023, McCookerybook and Gina Birch collaborated on a Captain Beefheart inspired original musical piece, Beefheart, the Musical. "It seeks to deconstruct the life story of Don Van Vliet, the renowned musician Captain Beefheart, in a series of original short pieces, inspired by fragments of his musical conversations." The work was commissioned by artists Derek Tyman and Andy Webster for their three-month long Rooms to Live project at Bury Art Museum & Sculpture Centre. The duo performed the piece in the gallery on Saturday 6 January 2024.

=== Helen McCookerybook ===
After a long break from performing live, when she was lecturing at the University of Westminster in 2005, a student asked her to support his band which she did. This, and the writing of new songs for the solo set, inspired her to begin performing and recording again as Helen McCookerybook.

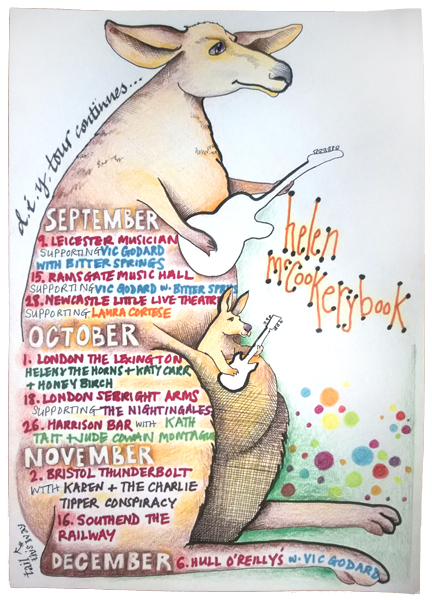
Helen McCookerybook's d.i.y. tour continues ... poster, 2017

Since then she has played extensively in towns and cities throughout the UK, at times sharing the bill with Gina Birch, Martin Stephenson and the Daintees, the Band of Holy Joy, the Monochrome Set, the Nightingales, Vic Godard and the Subway Sect, and Viv Albertine.

McCookerybook has released nine solo albums from 2006 to 2025, garnering reviews such as: "Helen McCookerybook's lyrics, frank and idiosyncratic, find poetry in the everyday shards of broken glass in the ice cream.", David Sheppard (Art & Music: The Saatchi Gallery Magazine), "… acoustically led, her songs are of love, politics and quite possibly, the kitchen sink, and her voice is pure as crystal.", Paul Scott-Bates (Louder Than War), and "The Sea by Helen McCookerybook is gentle but scathing, quiet but raging, fierce but melodic.", Cazz Blaise.

Her songs have received airplay on BBC Radio 6 Music's Gideon Coe show, including her last single Saturday Night with the London Set, So Long Elon (both from Green) and The Mad Bicycle Song (from The Sea). She's also had airplay on BBC Radio London's Gary Crowley show, with him playing A Good Life with a Bad Apple (from Green), which went on to make track of the week in August 2019. Mojo magazine gave her 10 track mini-album release, Pea Soup, four stars in their May 2020 issue saying "... the discipline of brevity makes this a shining gem". In October 2022, McCookerybook released her eighth solo album, Drawing on my Dreams, of which Gideon Coe said, "Helen McCookerybook has an excellent new record …". Guest musicians on the album included Steve Beresford, Lindy Morrison (The Go-Betweens), and Anne Wood of the Raincoats. It had pre-release airplay on BBC Radio 6 Music's Gideon Coe show (Coffee and Hope track), BBC Radio London's Gary Crowley show (Beachwalk track), Dexter Bentley's the Hello GoodBye Show (Amazonia track) on Resonance FM, and other stations. She also makes regular appearances and performs live on radio stations varying from independent stations such as Soho Radio and Resonance FM in London, the community Radio Woking station in Surrey, to BBC Scotland Highlands & Islands radio (where she was a featured artist).

In addition to her solo work, McCookerybook has been a long-term collaborator with Lester Square on various projects, as well as with Gina Birch, Martin Stephenson, Nick Page (Count Dubulah), Stuart Moxham (Young Marble Giants), the Charlie Tipper Conspiracy (a Christmas single, Femme Fatale, in aid of Refugee Action), and Vic Godard (a duet on Autumn Rendez-Vous on Mums' Revenge). In 2020, a collaboration with Robert Rotifer resulted in a new project called McCookerybook and Rotifer. Their debut 6 track EP, called Equal Parts, was released in December 2020. The EP premiered (pre-release) on Gideon Coe's BBC Radio 6 show when he played the track No Man's Land from it (and he went on to play it and other tracks during 2021). Her most recent collaboration was with analogue synth musician and producer Willie Gibson, for an EP called The Cutty Wren, which received a favourable review in The Wire magazine's May 2021 issue. In February 2023, Gina Birch released her debut solo album I Play My Bass Loud, on Jack White's Third Man Records, which was given a four stars rating in Mojo magazine. McCookerybook co-wrote two of the tracks and performed (backing vocals/bass) on four of them.

In 2024 McCookerybook wrote and recorded her latest album, Showtunes from the Shadows, which was released on Tiny Global Productions in January 2025. It features contributions from Gina Birch, Winston Blissette (Massive Attack), Terry Edwards (The Higsons, Gallon Drunk), Jack Hayter, James McCallum (The Chefs), Robert Rotifer, and Lester Square. From the album, the tracks Three Cheers for Toytown and Reaching for Hope were premiered (pre-release) on Gideon Coe and Riley & Coe's BBC Radio 6 shows (in October 2024 and January 2025 respectively).

== Academic career ==
Prior to her university work, Helen Reddington taught and organised song writing courses, projects, workshops, and musicals. These were mainly in the community, including working on housing estates with young people. She also mentored for Creative Partnerships.

In the 1990s, she began lecturing at the University of Westminster on its pioneering Commercial Music degree. British songwriter and performer Katy Carr cites Reddington's lectures on the musical works of the Raincoats and the Riot grrrl underground feminist punk rock movement as a source of initial inspiration for her own 2001 debut album Screwing Lies.

Whilst at Westminster she studied for a PhD, and was awarded with a doctorate. She went on to publish her thesis as an acclaimed book, Lost Women of Rock Music: Female Musicians of the Punk Era. Her second book on female sound engineers and producers, called She's at the Controls: Sound Engineering, Production and Gender Ventriloquism in the 21st Century, was published in March 2021. Reddington has also contributed chapters to several academic books and periodicals.

Since 2006 she has been teaching at the University of East London and recently BIMM London.

=== Lost Women of Rock Music (2007/12) ===
Lost Women of Rock Music: Female Musicians of the Punk Era was first published in July 2007, with an updated (Second Edition) paperback brought out in 2012. The book featured interviews with the Slits, Gina Birch (The Raincoats), the Mo-dettes, Enid Williams (Girlschool), Dolly Mixture, Gaye Black (The Adverts), Vi Subversa (Poison Girls), Rhoda Dakar, Lucy O'Brien, Attila the Stockbroker, Caroline Coon, Geoff Travis and the late John Peel.

=== Stories from the She-Punks (2018) ===
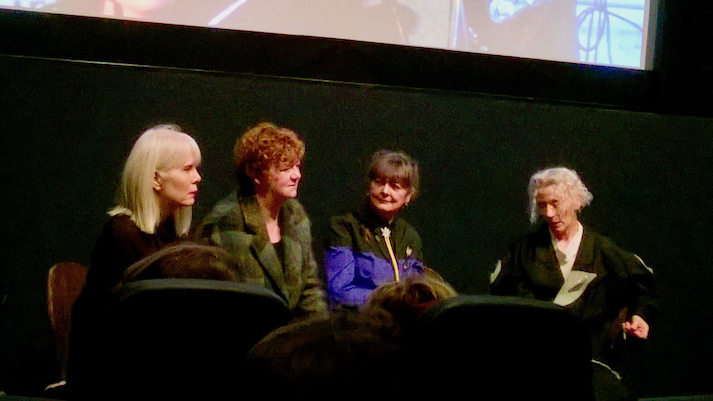
Panel discussion at the Stories from the She-Punks World Premiere in 2018.

Inspired by The Lost Women of Rock Music: Female Musicians of the Punk Era, Gina Birch and Helen Reddington produced the documentary film Stories from the She-Punks: Music with a different agenda, focusing on woman instrumentalists from the punk-inspired bands of the 70s.

It had a 'first glimpse' screening at the British Library on 10 June 2016. The World Premiere was at the Doc'n Roll London 2018 Film Festival at the Genesis Cinema, on 10 November 2018. Since then, it has been screened in Belfast, Liverpool, Brighton, Edinburgh, Nottingham, Lemington Spa, Manchester, Bristol, Glasgow, and Lincoln (mainly hosted by Doc'n Roll Festival).

The term 'she-punks' was created by Reddington for the British Library punk exhibition in 2016. It has since been used for a 2019 book title, Revenge of the She-Punks by Vivien Goldman, a music compilation, Guerrilla Girls! She-Punks & Beyond 1975-2016 (Ace), and a fashion label.

=== She's at the Controls (2021) ===
She's at the Controls: Sound Engineering, Production and Gender Ventriloquism in the 21st Century was published in paperback in March 2021. It is a socio-historical examination of the roles of women studio professionals in the UK music industry taken from analysis of interviews with 30 practitioners over 6 years. Interviewees included Laura B, Janet Beat, Isobel Campbell, Olga Fitzroy, Mandy Parnell, Susan Rogers, Sandie Shaw and Tina Weymouth.

== Discography ==
=== The Chefs ===
==== EPs ====
- Sweetie - 7-inch vinyl, Attrix Records, RB 10 EP, 1980.

==== Singles ====
- 24 Hours - 7-inch vinyl, Attrix Records, RB 13, 1981.
- 24 Hours - 7-inch vinyl, Graduate Records, GRAD 11, 1981.
- Femme Fatale as Skat - 7-inch vinyl, Graduate Records, GRAD 14, 1982.

=== Helen and the Horns ===
==== Albums & Compilations ====
- Helen and the Horns - LP vinyl, Rockin' Ray Records, RRR 1, 1985.
- Footsteps At My Door: BBC Sessions & More - CD, Damaged Goods, DAMGOOD419CD, 2014.

==== Singles ====
- Freight Train - 7-inch vinyl, Thin Sliced Records, TSR 3, 1984.
- Footsteps At My Door - 7-inch/12-inch vinyl, RCA Records, HEL 1/HELT 1, 1984.
- Surrey With The Fringe On Top - 7-inch/12-inch12-inch vinyl, RCA Records, HEL 2/HELT 2, 1984.

=== McCookerybook and Rotifer ===
==== Mini-album ====
- Equal Parts - 10-inch vinyl, Big Song/Gare du Nord Records, HMcC-GDN-01, 2020.

=== The Pop-Up Chefs ===
==== EPs ====
- The Pop-Up Chefs EP - 7-inch vinyl, Gare du Nord Records, GDN45122, 2025.

=== Helen McCookerybook ===
==== Albums ====
- Suburban Pastoral - CD, Big Song Records, HMcC01, 2006.
- Poetry & Rhyme - CD, Barbaraville Records, BVCD015, 2008.
- Hamilton Square with Martin Stephenson - CD, Barbaraville Records, BVCD016, 2009.
- Take One - CD, Barbaraville Records, BVCD019, 2010.
- Voxpop Puella - CD, Barbaraville Records, 2012.
- Cafe Of Tiny Kindnesses with Martin Stephenson - CD, Barbaraville Records, BVCD020, 2012.
- Anarchy Skiffle - CD, Barbaraville Records, 2014.
- The Sea - CD, Big Song Records, HMcC02, 2017.
- Green - CD, Big Song Records, HMcC04, 2019.
- Drawing on my Dreams - CD, Big Song Records, HMcC06, 2022.
- Showtunes from the Shadows - 12-inch vinyl/CD, Tiny Global Productions, PICI0065LP/PICI0065CD, 2025.

==== Mini-albums & EPs ====
- Christmas Assortment - CD, Bendi Records, BEN-EP-005, 2017.
- Pea Soup - 7-inch vinyl, Big Song Records, HMcC05, 2020.
- The Cutty Wren EP with Willie Gibson - 10-inch vinyl, Gare du Nord Records, GDN45041, 2021.

==== Singles ====
- Leavin' You Baby with Plato Page (Nick Page) - 12-inch vinyl, Pure Trash Records, PTR 2T, 1986.
- Femme Fatale with the Charlie Tipper Conspiracy - CD, Breaking Down Records, Break 021, 2016.
- Saturday Night with the London Set - 7-inch vinyl, Big Song Records, HMcC03, 2018.
- Beachwalk - Digital Release, Gare du Nord Records, GDN45056, 2023.

Discography sources.

== Bibliography ==
=== Dr Helen Reddington ===
==== Books ====
- Reddington, Helen (2007), The Lost Women of Rock Music: Female Musicians of the Punk Era. Ashgate Publishing, Hardback, ISBN 9780754657736
- Reddington, Helen (2012), The Lost Women of Rock Music: Female Musicians of the Punk Era (Second Edition). Equinox Publishing, Paperback, ISBN 9781845539573
- Reddington, Helen (2021), She's at the Controls: Sound Engineering, Production and Gender Ventriloquism in the 21st Century. Equinox Publishing, Paperback, ISBN 9781781796511

==== Book chapters ====
- Reddington, Helen (2000), "Voxpop puella : a work in progress" in Digital desires : language, identity and new technologies, ed. Cutting Edge: The Women's Research Group, Bloomsbury Academic, Paperback, ISBN 9781860645754
- Reddington, Helen (2003), "'Lady' Punks in Bands: A Subculturette?" in The Post-Subcultures Reader, eds. David Muggleton and Rupert Weinzierl, Berg Publishers, Hardback, ISBN 9781859736630
- Reddington, Helen (2004), "Hands off my instrument!" in Music, Power, and Politics, ed. Annie J. Randall. Routledge, Hardback, ISBN 9780415943642
- Reddington, Helen (2015), "Entrepreneurship and Music Technology Practitioners" in Music Entrepreneurship, eds. Allan Dumbreck and Gayle MacPherson, Bloomsbury Methuen Drama, Paperback, ISBN 9781472525406
- Reddington, Helen (2016), "The Political Pioneers of Punk: (Just Don't Mention The F-Word!)" in The Aesthetic Of Our Anger: Anarcho-Punk, Politics and Music, eds. Mike Dines and Matthew Worley. Minor Compositions, Paperback, ISBN 9781570273186
- Reddington, Helen (2018), "Détournement and female punk bands of the 1970s" in Rethinking Difference in Gender, Sexuality, and Popular Music: Theory and Politics of Ambiguity, ed. Gavin S. K Lee, Routledge, Hardback, ISBN 9781138960053
- Reddington, Helen (2020), "Danger, Anger, and Noise: The Women Punks of the Late 1970s and Their Music" in The Oxford Handbook of Punk Rock, eds. George McKay and Gina Arnold, Oxford Handbooks Online, ISBN 9780190859565
- Reddington, Helen (2022), "X-Ray Spex – 'Oh Bondage Up Yours!' (1977)" in One-Track Mind: Capitalism, Technology, and the Art of the Pop Song, ed. Asif Siddiqi, Routledge, ISBN 9780367553722

==== Periodicals ====
- Reddington, Helen (2018), "Gender Ventriloquism in Studio Production", in Vol 8, No 1: Gender Politics in the Music Industry, IASPM Journal, ISSN 2079-3871

== Filmography ==
=== Dr Helen Reddington ===
- Stories from the She-Punks: Music with a different agenda, Dir. Gina Birch & Helen Reddington, 2018, UK.
