= The Raincoats =

British experimental punk rock band

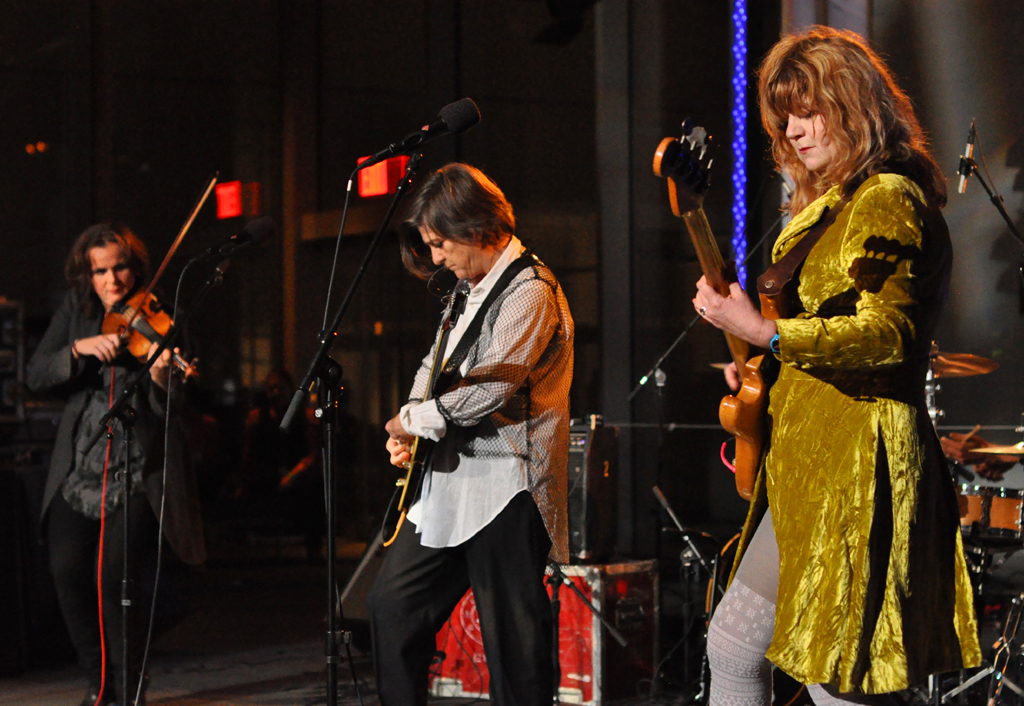
- The Raincoats performing in 2010 at the Museum of Modern Art

Background information
- Origin: London, England
- Genres: Post-punk; art punk; art pop; experimental rock
- Years active: 1977–1984; 1993–present
- Labels: Rough Trade; ROIR; DGC; Blast First; Smells Like; Geffen; Tim/Kerr; We ThRee; Kill Rock Stars
- Members: Ana da Silva; Gina Birch; Shirley O'Loughlin; Anne Wood; Vice Cooler
- Past members: Ross Crighton; Nick Turner; Kate Korris (Korus); Jeremie Frank; Patrick Keiller; Richard Dudanski; Palmolive; Vicky Aspinall; Ingrid Weiss; Jean-Marc Butty
- Website: www.theraincoats.net

The Raincoats are a British rock band formed in 1977. They were founded by Ana da Silva (vocals, guitar) and Gina Birch (vocals, bass) while the two were students at Hornsey College of Art in London. Other prominent members have included Vicky Aspinall (violin, vocals, keyboards), Palmolive (drums), and Richard Dudanski (drums).

Signed to the label Rough Trade, the band released three albums in their early incarnation: The Raincoats (1979), Odyshape (1981), and Moving (1984). They reformed in 1993 and released the album Looking in the Shadows in 1996.

== History ==
=== 1977–1993 ===
Da Silva and Birch were inspired to make a band in 1977 after they saw the Slits perform live earlier that year. Birch stated in an interview with She Shreds magazine, "It was as if suddenly I was given permission. It never occurred to me that I could be in a band. Girls didn't do that. But when I saw the Slits doing it, I thought, 'This is me. This is mine.'" For the band's first concert on 9 November 1977 at The Tabernacle, the line-up included Birch, da Silva, Ross Crighton (guitar), and Nick Turner (drums). Guitarist Kate Korus (from the Slits and later the Mo-dettes) joined briefly but was replaced by Jeremie Frank. Nick Turner left to form the Barracudas, and Richard Dudanski (ex–the 101ers and later Public Image Ltd.) sat in on drums, while filmmaker Patrick Keiller replaced Frank on guitar.

Late in 1978, the Raincoats became an all-female band as they were joined by the Slits' ex-drummer Palmolive and the classically trained violinist Vicky Aspinall. This line-up made their live debut at Acklam Hall in London on 4 January 1979. Geoff Travis, the founder of Rough Trade Records, recruited Mayo Thompson of the Red Krayola to produce the band at this time; they suggested that Aspinall approach her violin in the style of the Velvet Underground. Managed by Shirley O'Loughlin, the band went on their first UK tour with the Swiss female band Kleenex in May 1979 after Rough Trade released their first single, "Fairytale in the Supermarket." Johnny Rotten was an early admirer of the band, and later stated: "The Raincoats offered a completely different way of doing things, as did X-Ray Spex, and all the books about punk have failed to realise that these women were involved for no other reason than that they were good and original". The Raincoats' distinctly uncommercial sound did not appeal to everyone; after witnessing an early performance by the band, Danny Baker remarked that "they are so bad that every time a waiter drops a tray we'd all get up and dance."

On 21 November 1979, Rough Trade released the band's self-titled debut album. Palmolive had left the band in September, shortly before The Raincoats came out, and teenager Ingrid Weiss joined the band on drums. The Raincoats' second album, Odyshape, was released in 1981 and featured Weiss as well as drumming contributions from Dudanski, Robert Wyatt (Soft Machine), and Charles Hayward (This Heat). The Raincoats employed a diverse selection of cheap second-hand instruments such as the balophone, kalimba and gamelan on Odyshape, and the album incorporated British folk, dub basslines, polyrhythmic percussion and elements of free jazz among other world music influences. Its eclectic mix of musical genres has been described as one of the "great lost moments of women-in-rock".

"The basic theme in rock'n'roll is what goes on between men and women...Rock'n'roll is based on black music. And it's based in the exclusion of women and the ghettoization of blacks. Which is why we want to put a bit of distance between what we do and the rock'n'roll tradition."
— The Raincoats interviewed by Greil Marcus

In December 1982, the Raincoats recorded a live album at the arts space The Kitchen in New York. The Kitchen Tapes was released on cassette by ROIR in 1983.

The Raincoats recorded Moving in 1984. Tired of constant touring and "pulling in different musical directions," the band members began work on solo projects shortly after the album's release. Birch and Aspinall formed Dorothy, while da Silva worked with choreographer Gaby Agis on a series of dance projects and formed Roseland with Hayward.

In 1992, Kurt Cobain of Nirvana went into the Rough Trade Shop in Talbot Road, London, in search of a new copy of The Raincoats, and Jude Crighton sent him around the corner to see da Silva at her cousin's antique shop. Cobain wrote passionately about this meeting in the liner notes of Nirvana's Incesticide album. In late 1993, Rough Trade and DGC Records reissued the Raincoats' three studio albums, with liner notes by Cobain and Sonic Youth's Kim Gordon.

"I don't really know anything about the Raincoats except that they recorded some music that has affected me so much that, whenever I hear it I'm reminded of a particular time in my life when I was (shall we say) extremely unhappy, lonely, and bored. If it weren't for the luxury of putting that scratchy copy of the Raincoats' first record, I would have had very few moments of peace. I suppose I could have researched a bit of history about the band but I feel it's more important to delineate the way I feel and how they sound. When I listen to the Raincoats I feel as if I'm a stowaway in an attic, violating and in the dark. Rather than listening to them I feel like I'm listening in on them. We're together in the same old house and I have to be completely still or they will hear me spying from above and, if I get caught – everything will be ruined because it's their thing."
— Cobain's liner notes for The Raincoats

"I loved The Slits because of their boldness and that they actually had commercial songs, but it was the Raincoats I related to most. They seemed like ordinary people playing extraordinary music. They had enough confidence to be vulnerable and to be themselves without having to take on the mantle of male rock/punk rock aggression...or the typical female as sex symbol avec irony or sensationalism."
— Gordon's liner notes for Odyshape

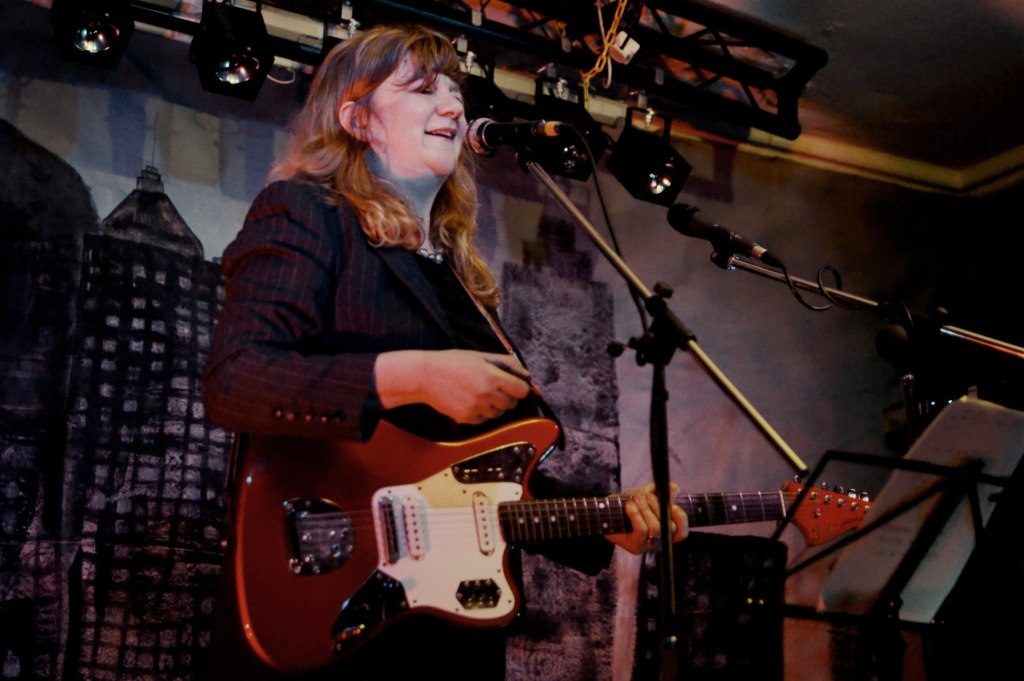
Gina Birch performing at Celebrating Sisterhood!, The Verge at The Cheshire Ring, 2012.

Later, Cobain listed the Raincoats' debut album at No. 21 in his 50 favorite albums.

=== 1994–present ===
O'Loughlin persuaded Birch and da Silva to play a show at The Garage in London in March 1994 with Steve Shelley (Sonic Youth) on drums and Anne Wood on violin to celebrate the album re-releases. They recorded a session for BBC Radio 1's John Peel, which was released as Extended Play on Paul Smith's Blast First and Shelley's label Smells Like Records. Cobain invited them to play on Nirvana's planned UK tour in April 1994, but he died a week before the tour began. The Raincoats released Looking in the Shadows on Rough Trade/Geffen in 1996, produced by Britpop producer Ed Buller (who had previously worked with Suede and Pulp). Musicians included Wood (violin, bass), Heather Dunn (drums), and Pete Shelley (Buzzcocks).

In 1995, the Tim/Kerr label released a Raincoats compilation, Fairytales.

Since 1996, the Raincoats have played some special events, such as Wyatt's Meltdown in 2001, and Chicks on Speed's 99 Cents album-release party in Berlin in December 2003. Birch and da Silva recorded a cover version of "Monk Chant" for a tribute album of Monks songs called Silver Monk Time, and performed the song live with the Monks at Berlin's Volksbühne in October 2006. They played at Ladyfest in Leeds in April 2007, and the Nuits Sonores Festival in Lyon on 18 May 2007. On 28 March 2009, The Raincoats-Fairytales-A Work in Progress, directed by Birch and produced by the Raincoats, was screened at the British Film Institute in London. On 25 April, the band performed at Donaufestival in Austria.

On 9 November 2009, the Raincoats' debut album was reissued on vinyl on We ThRee (the band's own label) in the UK and on the Kill Rock Stars label in the U.S.

The band performed at Matt Groening's All Tomorrow's Parties festival in May 2010 at Minehead in Somerset. The following week, the Raincoats played their debut album live for an ATP Don't Look Back concert at London's Scala, supported by the Raincoats-influenced band Trash Kit. On 21 November 2010, the Raincoats performed a concert as part of the PopRally series at MoMA in New York City. The band were invited by Jeff Mangum of Neutral Milk Hotel to perform their debut album live at the All Tomorrow's Parties festival in March 2012. In December 2011, it was announced that the Raincoats would also appear at the 35 Denton music festival in Texas the same month.

The Raincoats invited Angel Olsen to collaborate for the 40th anniversary of Rough Trade at London's Islington Assembly Hall on 3 November 2016.

On 5 October 2017, Jenn Pelly's 33⅓ book The Raincoats, about the band's first album, was published by Bloomsbury.

On 15 July 2025, Audrey Golden's book Shouting Out Loud: Lives of the Raincoats, the first comprehensive biography on the band, was released.

== Discography ==
Chart placings shown are from the UK Indie Chart.

=== Studio albums ===
- The Raincoats (1979, Rough Trade) – No. 5
- Odyshape (1981, Rough Trade) – No. 5
- Moving (1984, Rough Trade) – No. 5
- Looking in the Shadows (1996, Rough Trade/Geffen)

=== Singles and EPs ===
- "Fairytale in the Supermarket" 7" single (1979, Rough Trade) – UK No. 41 in October 2017
- "Running Away" 7" single (1982, Rough Trade) – No. 47
- "Animal Rhapsody" 12" single (1983, Rough Trade)
- Extended Play EP (1994, Blast First/Smells Like)
- "Don't Be Mean" 7"/CD single (1996, Rough Trade)

=== Live albums ===
- The Kitchen Tapes (1983, ROIR)

=== Compilation albums ===
- Fairytales (1995, Tim/Kerr)

=== Compilation appearances ===
- "In Love" on Wanna Buy a Bridge? (1980, Rough Trade)
- "Shouting Out Loud" on C81 (1981, Rough Trade/New Musical Express)
- "No One's Little Girl" on (Thanks to Rough Trade For) A Constant Source of Interruption (1990, Rough Trade)
- "In Love" on Lipstick Traces (1993, Rough Trade)
- "Off Duty Trip" on Totally Wired (1995, Razor and Tie)
- "In Love" on Upsalapalooza (1995, WFMU)
- "Shouting Out Loud" on Seething-ID, a Blast First Complication (1995, Blast First)
- "No One's Little Girl" on Postpunk Chronicles: Left of the Dial (1999, Rhino)
- "Fairytale in the Supermarket" on Rough Trade Shops – 25 Years (2001, Mute)
- "Lola", the Kinks cover, on Rough Trade Shops Post Punk 01 (2003, Mute)
- "Animal Rhapsody (Version)" on DJ-Kicks: Chicken Lips (2003, !K7)
- "Fairytale in the Supermarket" on Left of the Dial: Dispatches from the '80s Underground (2004, Rhino)
- "Only Loved at Night" on Rip It Up and Start Again – Postpunk 1978–1984 (2006, V2)
- "Monk Chant", the Monks cover, on Silver Monk Time – A Tribute to the Monks (2006, Play Loud! Productions)
- "Shouting Out Loud" on Girl Monster (2006, Chicks on Speed)
- "Honey Mad Woman" on ROIR Post Punk Compilation (2012, ROIR)
- "Shouting Out Loud" on Death Disco (Mojo Presents a Compendium of Post-Punk Grooves) (2014, Mojo)
- "Shouting Out Loud" on Recorded at the Automat: The Best of Rough Trade Records (2015, Rough Trade)
- "Lola", the Kinks cover, on Rough Trade Shops – Covers Vol. 1 (2016, Rough Trade)
- "Fairytale in the Supermarket" on 20th Century Women (Music from the Motion Picture) (2017, Rhino)

== Other sources ==
- Guardian Online review of book relating to female punk musicians/groups including Gina Birch and Ana da Silva
