= Vicky Aspinall =

British musician

Victoria Marion "Vicky" Aspinall is a British musician. She was the violinist in the English post-punk band the Raincoats from 1978 to 1984. In 1992, she and Dave Morgan founded the independent dance label Fresh Records (not the post-punk label of the same name) initially for releases of their own Lovestation project.

== Biography ==
Aspinall is a classically-trained violinist, having graduated from the Royal College of Music, London.

She was a member of Jam Today, a part of the Women's Music Movement that developed in the late 1970s, playing a hybrid of jazz and rock similar in approach to groups like Henry Cow.

She joined the Raincoats after she noticed an advertisement which read "female musician wanted - strength not style" in radical bookshop Compendium in Camden Town. She has been credited, by Gina Birch of the Raincoats, with making the band more aware of feminist ideas. Aspinall and Birch later formed the band Dorothy which was subsequently signed by Geoff Travis to Chrysalis Records.
