= Ana da Silva =

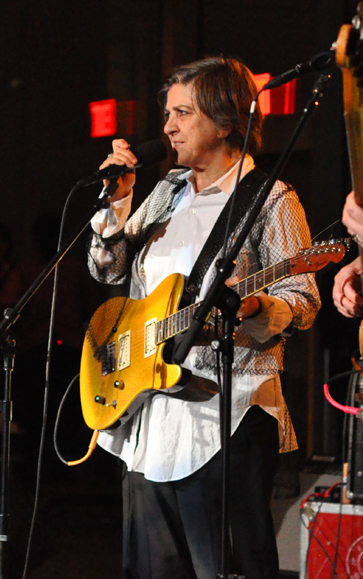
- The Raincoats with Kathleen Hanna at the Museum of Modern Art, 2010

Background information
- Born: Madeira, Portugal
- Genres: Post-punk
- Instruments: Guitar; vocals
- Years active: 1977–present
- Labels: Rough Trade; Chicks on Speed; shouting out loud!
- Member of: The Raincoats

Ana Paula de Lima Pita da Silva is a musician, best known as a founding member of post-punk rock band the Raincoats.

== Career ==
Born on the island of Madeira in Portugal, da Silva grew up without television and little access to popular culture. She had exposure to music through radio, and as a child was deeply moved by rock and roll from the Beatles and the Rolling Stones. She went to university in Lisbon, studying Filologia Germânica from 1968 to 1974. Da Silva relocated to London in December 1974, and while studying at Hornsey College of Art, she formed the Raincoats with Gina Birch in 1977. She worked at the Rough Trade shop in the Ladbroke Grove during her time in the band.

In 1984, she provided backing vocals on the Go-Betweens' song "Bachelor Kisses". After releasing three albums, the Raincoats split up in 1984, da Silva going on to collaborate with drummer Charles Hayward of This Heat (one of many drummers that had passed through the Raincoats' ranks) as the duo Roseland, although they abandoned the project after recording some demos.

She went on to write music for choreographer Gaby Agis's productions, and subsequently concentrated on painting. While working in a cousin's antique shop in London, she met longtime Raincoats fan Kurt Cobain, prompting him to convince DGC to reissue the band's back catalogue.

The Raincoats reformed and released a new album in 1996, but da Silva did not produce any new music until the 2005 album The Lighthouse.

Da Silva performed live in London, Munich, Portugal and at the Ladyfestspain in Madrid.

== Discography ==
=== Albums ===
- 2005 - The Lighthouse
- 2018 - Island (with Phew)

=== Singles ===
- 2004 - "In Awe of a Painting" / "Litany"

== Books ==
- 2018 - Love, Oh Love (Rough Trade Books)
