= Gina Birch =

English musician and filmmaker

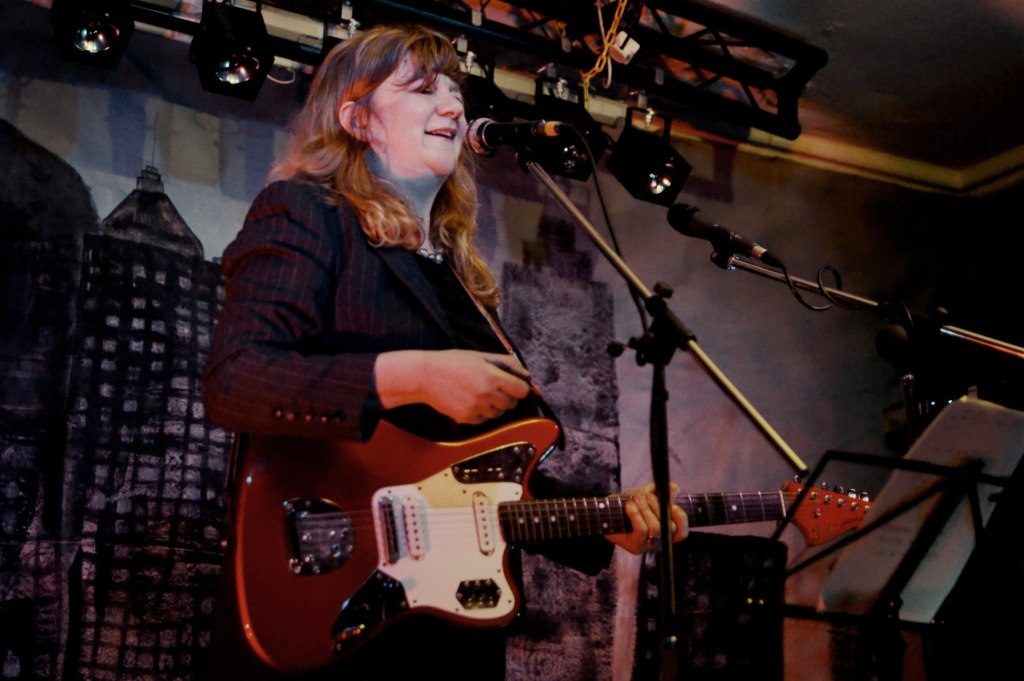
Gina Birch performing at Celebrating Sisterhood!, The Verge at The Cheshire Ring, 2012.

Georgina Mary Birch (born October 1955) is an English musician and filmmaker, best known as a founding member of post-punk rock band the Raincoats.

== Biography ==
Born in Nottingham, Birch attended Nottingham Girls' High School and subsequently Hornsey School of Art, where she formed the Raincoats with Ana da Silva in 1977. Following the first breakup of the Raincoats in 1984, Birch worked with experimental musician Mayo Thompson and his ensemble, Red Crayola, for a period in Germany. After this time, Birch formed the band Dorothy, with fellow ex-Raincoat Vicky Aspinall. The band was subsequently signed by Geoff Travis to Rough Trade. Following Dorothy's breakup, Birch matriculated at the Royal College of Art, where she studied film direction, and produced several dramas. In the early 1990s, the Raincoats were asked to perform on tour with grunge band Nirvana, and were consequently invited to make an album by DGC Records. This temporarily interrupted Birch's filmmaking endeavors. However, Birch did produce several music videos in this period, including the DVD video for the Libertines, released with their album. Gina has directed videos for Daisy Chainsaw, the Libertines, Palma Violets, the Raincoats, Dorothy, and others. She directed New Order's "Crystal" with artist Simon Tyszko, as well as multiple video installations. Birch's musical career continued through the 1990s, with the 1998 release of the album Slow Dirty Tears with the Hangovers, a band she had formed in 1996. In 2000 and 2007, Birch performed live at Ladyfest, and continues to perform regularly in London. In September 2007, she performed at the Modern Art Oxford to commemorate the end of the museum's Stella Vine exhibition. Additionally, Birch has performed with Hayley Newman and Kaffe Matthews, as the Gluts, playing in several art museums and festivals. Currently, Birch pursues painting, and continues to produce music for subsequent albums.

On 1 October 2021, Birch released her debut solo single, "Feminist Song". Her debut solo album, I Play My Bass Loud, was issued on 24 February 2023. An AllMusic review noted that "It's a loud, celebratory album that perfectly boils down Birch's 40-plus-year journey as a tireless, boundless, and most of all fearless, creator".

Birch's second studio album, Trouble, was released on 11 July 2025 via Third Man Records in LP, CD and digital formats.

== Discography ==
=== Albums ===
- I Play My Bass Loud (2023), Third Man Records
- Trouble (2025)

=== Singles ===
List of singles
Title	Year	Album
"Feminist Song"	2021	I Play My Bass Loud
