= Bootleg Retrospective =

Compilation album by the Slits
- Released: 17 March 1980
- Recorded: various homes and stages, 1977–1979
- Genres: Post-punk, punk rock
- Label: Y Records

The Slits chronology
Cut (1979)	Bootleg Retrospective (1980)	Return of the Giant Slits (1981)

Bootleg Retrospective is a compilation album by the Slits. The album is officially untitled. It is also referred to as Y (its record label), Y3LP (its serial number), Y3Lp—The Official Bootleg, (On a Japanese RCA Victor reissue), and, in Greil Marcus' book "Lipstick Traces," A Boring Life, or Once Upon A Time In A Living Room.

The album consists of lo-fi demos and live performances, mostly, in all likelihood from 1977-9, preceding the sessions for 1979's Cut album. Two recordings, "Face Place" and "Or What Is It?", are skeletal, incomplete sketches of songs which appeared in finished form on 1981's Return of the Giant Slits album. A 30-second section of "Bongos on the Lawn" appears at the opening of the promotional video for "Instant Hit" from the Cut album.

In spite of its rough and informal appearance, the album was an authorized release compiled by the Slits, who were signed to Y Records at the time. It was released by Y Records, on or around 17 March 1980, and was distributed by Rough Trade Records.

== Track listing ==
All tracks written by Viv Albertine, Tessa Pollitt, Arianne Forster (a.k.a. Ari Up) and Paloma Romero (a.k.a. Palmolive)

=== Side one ===
1. "A Boring Life"
2. "Slime"
3. "Face Place"
4. "No. 1 Enemy" – recorded by Dick O'Dell from In the Beginning (A Live Anthology 1977–81)
5. "Vaseline"

=== Side two ===
1. "Or What Is It?" (a.k.a. "Or What It Is?" on Return of the Giant Slits)
2. "Bongos On the Lawn" – from the soundtrack to Don Letts' short film Slits Pictures (1979)
3. "Let's Do the Split" (a.k.a. "Vindictive" on The Peel Sessions)
4. "Once Upon a Time in a Living Room"
5. "No More Rock n Roll for You"/"Mosquitoes"

A CD re-release by Japanese RCA Victor uses the wrong song titles on several of the tracks; this is verifiable by comparing the titles with other appearances of these songs on various studio and live Slits releases.

The performance titled "No More Rock n Roll For You" is a 30 May 1977 live encore co-performance with the bands Subway Sect and the Prefects, from the California Ballroom in Dunstable on the White Riot tour. This track is included on Vic Godard and the Subway Sect's compilation Twenty Odd Years as "We Oppose All Rock and Roll/Sister Ray"; it features extensive lyric quotations from the Velvet Underground song "Sister Ray".

== Personnel ==
The Slits

- Ari Up – vocals
- Viv Albertine – guitar
- Tessa Pollitt – bass guitar

with:

- Paloma Romero (a.k.a. Palmolive) – drums on "No. 1 Enemy" (uncredited)
- Nina Hagen – vocals on "No. 1 Enemy" (uncredited)
- Additional vocals/instruments on "No Rock N Roll for You" by Vic Godard and Subway Sect, and members of the Prefects (uncredited)
