= Ari Up =

German vocalist (1962–2010)

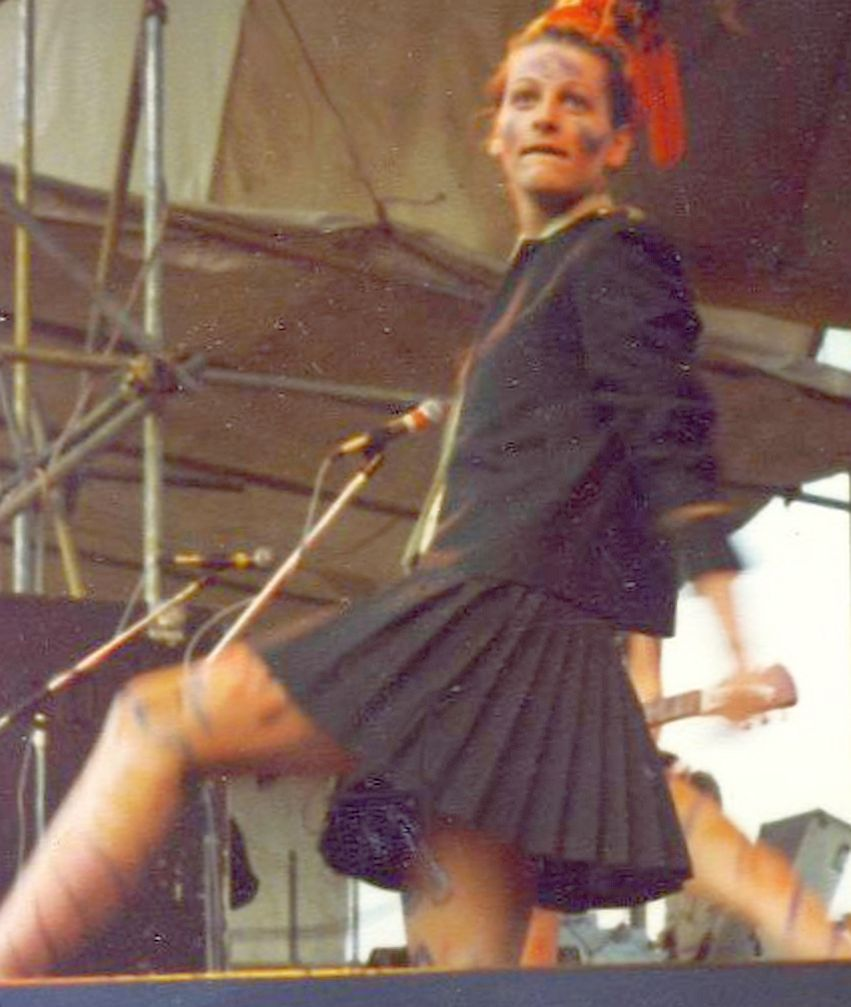
- Ari Up performing in 1980

Background information
- Also known as: Baby Ari, Madussa
- Born: Ariane Daniele Forster; 17 January 1962; Munich, West Germany
- Died: 20 October 2010 (aged 48) Los Angeles, California, U.S.
- Genres: Punk rock; post-punk; reggae; dub; techno; dancehall
- Occupation: Musician
- Instrument: Vocals
- Years active: 1976–2010
- Website: ariup.com

Ariane Daniele Forster (17 January 1962 – 20 October 2010), known by her stage name Ari Up, was a German vocalist best known as a member of the English punk rock band the Slits.

== Biography ==
Ari Up was born in Munich, West Germany. Both her parents were involved in the music industry; her father, Frank Forster, was a German schlager singer who had some success in the 1950s and 1960s, and her mother Nora Forster was a friend of Jimi Hendrix and dated Chris Spedding for three years. Ari's maternal grandfather was the German newspaper proprietor Franz Karl Maier, owner of Der Tagesspiegel. Her godfathers were Austrian singer/composer Udo Jürgens and Jon Anderson, the singer of the group Yes.

Nora Forster married the Sex Pistols' lead singer, John Lydon, in 1979. Their home was a punk domain where Nora would take in poor musicians. The constant presence of punk music led to Ari experimenting with it herself, learning to play the guitar from the Clash's Joe Strummer.

In 1976, at the age of 14, Up formed the Slits with drummer Palmolive. Guitarist Viv Albertine joined the group and was impressed by the young singer. "English was her second language", Albertine said in an interview, "it was not easy for her and she had to fight to be taken seriously." She succeeded: "Ari was the most dynamic woman I have ever known", said Albertine. "The way she carried herself was a revolution."

By the late 1970s, the Slits were touring as the opening act for the Clash. Ari Up's love of reggae led the Slits into a "jungly" dub style. She was the most flamboyant member of the group, becoming known for her wild hair and stage outfits. She can be seen briefly in the film Rude Boy (1980), associating with the Clash backstage. Her 1977 performances with the Slits are featured in The Punk Rock Movie (1978), a documentary release of various punk group club performances, principally at The Roxy.

After the Slits disbanded in 1981, Up moved with her boyfriend, Glenmore "Junior" Williams, and twin sons to jungle regions of Indonesia and Belize and lived among indigenous people. They moved to Jamaica and settled in Kingston. She continued to make music, first with the New Age Steppers, then as a solo artist, using the stage names Baby Ari, Madussa, and Ari Up. Her third son was born in 1994, although the boy's father had been shot dead by the time he was born. In 2000, John Lydon and Nora Forster became legal guardians of Up's teenage twin boys; Lydon said, "[Ari Up] let them run free. They couldn't read, write or form proper sentences. One day Ari Up said she couldn't cope with them any more. I suggested they came to us because I wasn’t having them abandoned. They gave us hell, but I loved having kids around."

Up's first full-length solo album, Dread More Dan Dead, was released in 2005. She appeared on Lee "Scratch" Perry's Repentance (2008), and performed a duet on a cover version of Mike Hugg's song "Mister, You're a Better Man Than I" on Mark Stewart's Edit (2008).

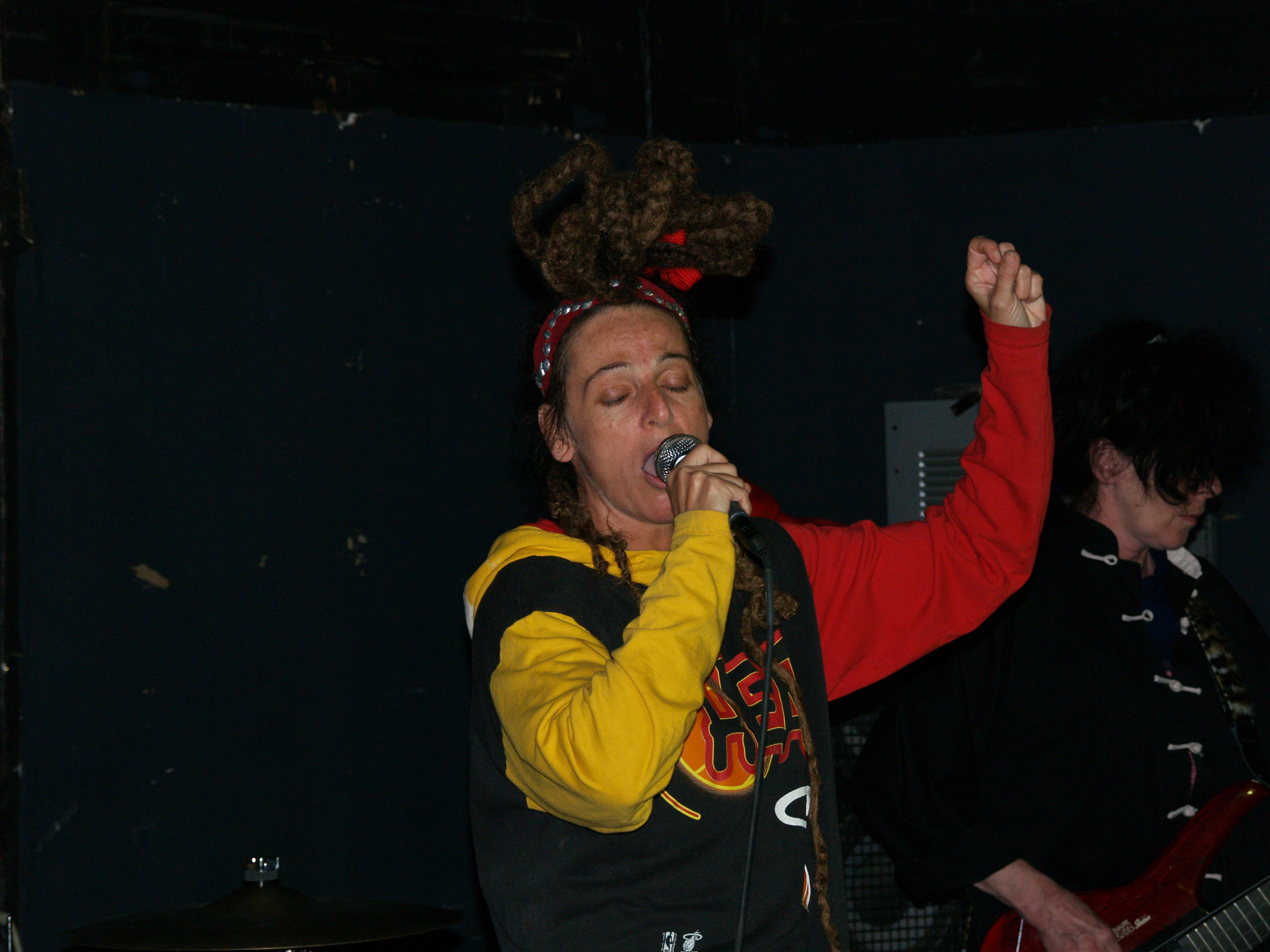
Ari Up in 2008

In 2008, Ari Up was diagnosed with breast cancer. She refused chemotherapy. Lydon later commented, "Who refuses chemo because they don’t want their Rasta locks cut off? Ariane Forster was just … not sensible. She thought she could cure herself with witch doctors. We spent hundreds of thousands trying to save her, but it was too late." Despite the diagnosis, she performed in July 2009, with Perry and Austrian dub band Dubblestandart in Brooklyn, New York, just before the Central Park SummerStage festival. One of her last recordings took place in May 2010, in New York with Perry. The sessions were recorded by the Subatomic Sound System and released in August 2010 on 7-inch vinyl, titled "Hello, Hell is Very Low" b/w "Bed Athletes." The Slits' final work, the video for the song "Lazy Slam" from Trapped Animal, was released posthumously in accordance with Ari's wishes.

On 20 October 2010, Ari Up died in Los Angeles, aged 48. Her death was initially announced on Lydon's homepage. Lydon and Nora Forster became guardians of Up's third son.

A tribute Punky Reggae Birthday Party was held at the Music Hall of Williamsburg in Brooklyn by Dunia Best, Aram Sinnreich, and Vivien Goldman on 16 January 2011. Neneh Cherry, Tessa Pollitt, Hollie Cook and other former members of the Slits performed, along with members of the True Warriors, New Age Steppers, and other friends and associates.

== Discography ==
- The Slits – Cut (1979, Island)
- V/A – We Do 'Em Our Way (1980, MFP)
- New Age Steppers – The New Age Steppers (1980, On-U Sound)
- The Slits – Return of the Giant Slits (1981, CBS)
- The Slits – The Peel Sessions (1987, Strange Fruit)
- V/A – Lipstick Traces (1993, Rough Trade)
- V/A – Rough Trade Shop, Post Punk 01 (2xCD, Comp) (2003, Mute)
- Ari Up – "True Warrior" / "I'm Allergic" 7-inch (2004, For Us)
- The Slits – Live at the Gibus Club (2005, Earmark)
- Ari Up – Baby Mother 12-inch (2005, Collision: Cause of Chapter 3)
- Ari Up – Dread More Dan Dead (2005, Collision: Cause of Chapter 3)
- V/A – Girl Monster (3xCD, Comp) (2006, Chicks on Speed Records)
- The Slits – Revenge of the Killer Slits 7-inch (2006, S.A.F. Records)
- Dubblestandart vs. Ken Boothe vs. Ari Up – "When I Fall in Love" / "Island Girl" 12-inch (2007, Collision: Cause of Chapter 3)
- The Slits – Trapped Animal (2009, Narnack Records)
- Subatomic Sound System Meets Ari Up & Lee "Scratch" Perry – "Hello, Hello, Hell Is Very Low" / "Bed Athletes" (7-inch) (2010, Subatomic Sound)
- Ari Up & Vic Ruggiero – Rare Singles and More... (2011, Ska in the World)
- New Age Steppers – Love Forever (2012, On-U Sound)
