= The New Age Steppers (album) =

Studio album by The New Age Steppers
- Released: 1981
- Studio: Berry Street Studio, London
- Length: 43:51
- Label: On-U Sound
- Producer: Adrian Sherwood

The New Age Steppers chronology
The New Age Steppers (1981)	Action Battlefield (1981)

Singles from The New Age Steppers
- 1. "Fade Away" Released: 1980

The New Age Steppers is the debut studio album by The New Age Steppers. It was released on On-U Sound in 1981.

== Critical reception ==
Professional ratings
Review scores
Source	Rating
AllMusic	4/5 stars
Trouser Press	mixed

Andy Kellman of AllMusic gave the album 4 out of 5 stars, commenting that "the record epitomizes the spirit of the exciting late-'70s/early-'80s crossbreeding that took place between punk and reggae." Ira Robbins of Trouser Press called the album "intriguing, if not entirely successful". David Katz of Fact wrote, "the New Age Steppers' eponymous debut is a messy, self-indulgent set that points in several directions at once, ultimately forming a sonic marker of an era when the link between punk and dub was anything but tenuous."

== Track listing ==
No.	Title	Writer(s)	Length
1.	"Fade Away"	Junior Byles	5:36
2.	"Radial Drill"	Style Scott; Adrian Sherwood	4:31
3.	"State Assembly"	Scott; Sherwood	6:20
4.	"Crazy Dreams and High Ideals"	Mark Stewart	5:45
5.	"Abderhamane's Demise"	Scott; Sherwood	3:50
6.	"Animal Space"	Viv Albertine; Ariane Forster; Tessa Pollitt	5:41
7.	"Love Forever"	Jarret Lloyd Vincent	7:25
8.	"Private Armies"	Vivien Goldman	4:51

2011 reissue edition bonus tracks
No.	Title	Length
9.	"Izalize"	4:38
10.	"May I"	6:11
11.	"Avante Gardening"	4:06
12.	"Singing Love"	5:07

== Personnel ==
Credits adapted from liner notes.

- Ari Up – vocals
- Vivien Goldman – vocals
- Mark Stewart – vocals
- John Waddington – guitar
- Viv Albertine – guitar
- Antonio "Crucial Tony" Phillips – guitar
- George Oban – bass guitar
- Steve Beresford – bass guitar, piano, percussion effects
- Sean Oliver – piano
- Vikki Aspinall – violin
- Bruce Smith – synthesizer, drums, percussion effects
- Style Scott – drums
- Cecil – drums
- Stephen "Shoes" New – drums
- Dan Sheals – drums

Technical

- Nobby Turner – percussion effects, engineering
- Adrian Sherwood – production, mixing
- Bob – engineering
- Andy Martin (credited as Bill Bell) – artwork
