= Rotten: No Irish, No Blacks, No Dogs =

Autobiography by John Lydon

Rotten
- Author: John Lydon; Keith Zimmerman; Kent Zimmerman
- Language: English
- Genre: Non-fiction; Autobiography
- Publication date: 1994
- Media type: Print

Rotten: No Irish, No Blacks, No Dogs is an autobiography by John Lydon, former singer, songwriter, and front man of the punk band Sex Pistols. Co-authors of the autobiography are Keith and Kent Zimmerman. The book was first published in 1994 by St Martin's Press (USA) and Hodder & Stoughton (UK); a second edition became available in 2008 by Plexus Publishing (UK) and Picador (US). ,

== Overview ==
Rotten: No Irish, No Blacks, No Dogs chronicles John Lydon's childhood and youth in a family of Irish immigrants (father was also John and mother Eileen) in Holloway and Finsbury Park, London, as well as his musical career in the Sex Pistols and the early beginnings of his second project, the band PiL (Public Image Limited). The autobiography is organized in 23 segments, some narrated by John Lydon, others by band members, family, or friends. Comments by acquaintances such as Billy Idol or Chrissie Hynde are interspersed throughout the book along with personal photos which were provided by family and friends. Towards the end of the book, one segment is dedicated to the track list of the Sex Pistols with stories of how each of the songs came to be. Lydon in describing the book stated 'in reading the book, you’ll notice more than a few contradictions. That is what makes the book valid. Contradiction is the art form.'

== Contributors ==
Sex Pistols: John Lydon, stage name Johnny Rotten (lead singer, songwriter), Paul Cook (drummer), Steve Jones (guitarist). Family: Nora Forster (wife), John Christopher Lydon (father). Friends and colleagues: John Gray, Chrissie Hynde, John "Rambo" Stevens, Caroline Coon, Billy Idol, Howard Thompson, Bob Gruen, Steven Severin, Don Letts, Jeannette Lee, Julien Temple

Missing voices per George McKay in his review of Rotten, No Irish, No Blacks, No Dogs: Glen Matlock (bassist, author of "I Was A Teenage Sex Pistol"; Sid Vicious (bassist, died in 1979), Malcolm McLaren (manager).

== Content ==
I was raised in England, and I am English in this way. Romantically, I would like to believe I am Irish. While I have some vague vision of pastoral eloquence, I know that this isn't real. It's like a romanitic novel. I am British.

The first segment in Lydon's autobiography begins with the dissolution of the Sex Pistols following the Winterland concert in San Francisco in 1978. Malcolm, McLaren, the manager, chose a project in Rio over a previously scheduled concert in Stockholm which subsequently had to be cancelled. By that time, Sid Vicious had descended into drug addiction, and management, according to John Lydon, was severely lacking. Sid Vicious and John Lydon returned to England separately, and Malcolm, Paul Cook, and Steve Jones went on to Rio.

The autobiography continues with John Lydon's early childhood in poverty as the oldest of four boys. 'I remember all the kids running around in rags. It was quite common for most kids to have no shoes'. 'I was raised in a tenement. Working class, slummy.... The building was a Victorian dwelling that held forty or fifty families.' His father had solid employment as a crane driver and trips to Ireland in the family car are mentioned, together with cinema trips and home TV and record player. His parents were Irish immigrants and in the neighbourhood there was anti-Irish sentiment. Lydon states 'Londoners had no choice but to accept the Irish because there were so many of us, and we do blend in better than the Jamaicans. When I was very young and going to school, I remember bricks thrown at me by English parents '. However he also states 'For all intents and purposes, I was brought up as a Londoner. That's the place that educated me.'John Lydon's Catholic school education may be considered one of the causes of his rebellious behavior in adolescence. At age eight, John was admitted to St Ann's Hospital Haringay due to meningitis and remained hospitalized for several months. His final school years are described as full of conflict with his teachers, eventually leading to expulsion at the age of 15. He continued his education at Further Education Colleges. 'I studied English literature and art. I liked poetry and the writings of Ted Hughes....I got into Oscar Wilde....Reading Shakespeare, I found his characters vivid.' During his late teens, he became friends with Sid Vicious. (The name Sid Vicious is after John Lydon's hamster.) The book mentions his jobs in youth, from working in a mini-cab office, teaching children woodwork in a play centre. working on construction sites (including being a rat catcher), often with his father and later house cleaning.

Also included in the book is the formation of the band Sex Pistols in England in 1975 by John Lydon, Paul Cook, Steve Jones, and Glen Matlock (first bassist). The manager was Malcolm McLaren. The most famous songs are Anarchy in the UK and God Saves the Queen. Only one album has been released by the Sex Pistols, Never Mind The Bollocks, here’s The Sex Pistols. One of the notable events in the history of the Sex Pistols and described in the autobiography is the boat performance of "God Saves the Queen" two weeks before the Silver Jubilee which led to widespread condemnation and violence against band members. Two movies about the band existed at the time of writing - "Sid and Nancy" and "The Great Rock’n Roll Swindle" which are described as fictional by John Lydon in his autobiography.

Detailed descriptions exist about the disagreements among band members which led to the replacement of Glen Matlock with Sid Vicious. Tensions did not ease, in part due to difficulties with Sid Vicious’ girlfriend Nancy Spungeon whose behavior is described to have been very hard to bear throughout John Lydon's autobiography. In addition, there were arguments between Malcolm McLaren and John Lydon.

The mythos regarding Sid Vicious contrasts with his actual behavior as described in Rotten: No Irish, No Blacks, No Dogs. Steve Severin from Siouxsie and the Banshees describes Sid Vicious as quiet and sweet with a "brilliant sense of humor". John Lydon's memories of Sid Vicious do not exclude the at times ugly details of his descent into drug addiction. Following the death of Nancy Spungeon, Sid Vicious died in New York on Groundhog Day in 1979 due to a drug overdose.

The disagreements between John Lydon and Malcolm McLaren eventually culminated in a lawsuit against Malcolm McLaren with a verdict in favor of John Lydon. The affidavits are included in segment 20.

In his autobiography, John Lydon's also tells of the early beginnings of his band PiL (Public Image Limited) which he later described as his "heart and soul".

In the last segment of Rotten: No Irish, No Blacks, No Dogs, John Lydon reflects on his life as well as the late Sid Vicious and gives up on a final reconciliation attempt with Malcolm McLaren. The autobiography begins and ends with John Lydon's Winterland quote "Ever get the feeling you’ve been cheated?".

== Punk as described in Rotten, No Irish, No Blacks, No Dogs ==
While both the origin of the Sex Pistols as well as the beginning punk itself are under dispute, John Lydon considers himself and a small circle of friends the root of punk, long before the Sex Pistols came to be. Notable is the disagreement with Malcolm McLaren regarding the creation of the Sex Pistols. Lydon describes the novelty of punk music as both a curse and a blessing as people could not relate to it. It simply did not match anything they could remember. The music style may be described as ‘raw’. One big component of punk is surely the fashion style which was marked by "deviance, defiance, and opposition". While some of most stark controversies surely stem from Vivienne Westwood's boutique SEX, John Lydon actually preferred clothing from the store Acme Attractions. The ideology of punk which is known to turn conventions upside down is reflected in both music and fashion through "originality, authenticity, and individuality". Indeed, John Lydon describes individuality as "a major theme" in his book.

== Reception ==
John Lydon's first autobiography was named one of the 35 best rock memoirs by Rolling Stone magazine. It was followed by a second autobiography in 2014, "Anger is an Energy: My Life Uncensored"
