= Return of the Giant Slits =

Studio album by the Slits
- Released: October 1981
- Genres: Post-punk, world music, dub
- Label: CBS
- Producers: Dennis Bovell, Dick O'Dell, the Slits, Nick Launay

The Slits chronology
Bootleg Retrospective (1980)	Return of the Giant Slits (1981)	Trapped Animal (2009)

Professional ratings
Review scores
Source	Rating
AllMusic	3/5 stars
Pitchfork Media	7.4/10
Spin Alternative Record Guide	6/10

Return of the Giant Slits is the second studio album by English punk band the Slits, released in 1981 by CBS Records on LP and cassette. In comparison with its widely acclaimed predecessor, Cut, released in 1979, it showcases a rhythmic, more experimental sound, inspired by afro-pop. The Slits would disband for the first time months after its release in early 1982.

The album was out of print for more than two decades until being reissued on CD by CBS Japan in 2004 and then by Blast First in 2007 with a bonus disc featuring alternate versions of songs from the album.

== Track listing ==
- All songs written by the Slits. (Published by Virgin Music Ltd.)

Original album

1. "Earthbeat" (3:50)
2. "Or What It Is?" (4:24)
3. "Face Place" (4:23)
4. "Walk About" (4:43)
5. "Difficult Fun" (4:06)
6. "Animal Space/Spacier" (6:42)
7. "Improperly Dressed" (4:28)
8. "Life on Earth" (6:33)

CBS Japan issued the album on CD in 2004 with the Japanese version of "Earthbeat" as a bonus track.

2007 bonus disc

1. "Japanese Earthbeat (Daichi No Oto)" (5:01)
2. "German Earthbeat" (4:57)
3. "Dub Beat" (4:59)
4. "Face Place Dub" (4:24)
5. "Begin Again Rhythm" (5:45)
6. "Earthbeat" 12" Version (7:17)
7. "Earthbeat Extra" (3:51)
8. WORT FM USA Interview (12:00)

== Personnel ==
The Slits

- Ari Up – vocals, keyboards, percussion
- Viv Albertine – guitar, backing vocals
- Tessa Pollitt – bass guitar
- Bruce Smith – drums, percussion

with:

- Dave Lewis – other instruments ("for helping play")
- Steve Beresford – other instruments ("plays a lot on this record")
- Neneh Cherry – backing vocals

Technical

- Nick Launay – engineer
- Neville Brody – sleeve
- Anton Corbijn – photography
