= Trapped Animal =

Studio album by the Slits
- Released: 6 October 2009
- Recorded: 2009
- Studios: Swing House, Hollywood, Los Angeles
- Genres: Post-punk, punk rock
- Label: Narnack
- Producers: Adrian Sherwood, the Slits

The Slits chronology
Return of the Giant Slits (1981)	Trapped Animal (2009)

Professional ratings
Aggregate scores
Source	Rating
Metacritic	(59/100)
Review scores
Source	Rating
BBC	(favourable)
AllMusic	3.5/5 stars
The Guardian	link
PopMatters	(5/10) link
Prefix Magazine	(3/10) link
NME	(4/10) link

Trapped Animal is the third and final studio album by English punk band the Slits. It was released on 6 October 2009, and was their first album since their 2006 reunion which initially resulted in the EP Revenge of the Killer Slits. Founding vocalist Ari Up and bassist Tessa Pollitt returned, although the rest of the band underwent significant lineup changes introducing Hollie Cook on backing vocals, Adele Wilson on guitar, Little Anna (Anna Ozawa) on keyboards and melodica (her original song "Be It" included) and Anna Schulte on drums. Trapped Animal received mixed to negative reviews from critics upon release. The Slits continued to tour the album until the following year when Up died after a two year battle with breast cancer, causing the band to disband permanently.

== Track listing ==
1. "Ask Ma"
2. "Lazy Slam"
3. "Pay Rent"
4. "Reject"
5. "Trapped Animals"
6. "Issues"
7. "Peer Pressure"
8. "Partner from Hell"
9. "Babylon"
10. "Cry Baby"
11. "Reggae Gypsy"
12. "Be It"
13. "Can't Relate"
14. "Had a Day"
