= Palmolive (musician) =

Spanish musician

- Also known as: Paloma McLardy
- Born: Paloma Romero; 26 December 1954 (age 71); Melilla, Spain
- Genres: Punk rock, post-punk
- Occupation: Musician
- Instrument: Drums
- Years active: 1976–1979
- Label: Rough Trade
- Formerly of: The Slits; The Raincoats; The Flowers of Romance
- Website: www.andalucia.com/history/people/paloma-romero

Paloma McLardy (née Romero, born 26 December 1954), known as Palmolive, is a Spanish drummer and songwriter who was a member of influential early British punk bands. She founded the Slits toward the end of 1976. After leaving that group in 1978, she joined the Raincoats and performed on their first album, The Raincoats (1979).

== Early life and punk rock career ==
Palmolive was born in Melilla, Spain, into a family of nine children, and grew up in Málaga with her four sisters. A teenager who chafed against the political repression and conservatism of Francoist Spain, Palmolive left for London at 17 to "learn about life". She returned to Madrid three months later to attend university, where she participated in anti-fascist activism, sometimes getting in trouble with the police.

Before long, she returned to London and lived at a hippie squat at 101 Walterton Road where she met Joe Strummer, who had recently changed his name from Woody Mellor. The couple were together for several years. Joe, who played in pub-rock band the 101ers just before punk emerged in the city, joined shortly later the Clash. Punk's "explosive energy" and sense of radical freedom inspired McLardy. Like many others on the scene, she acquired a punk name, Palmolive, inspired by Paul Simonon's playful mis-pronunciation of "Paloma".

Returning to London after a break in Scotland, Palmolive wanted to become a mime artist, but the troupe she contacted needed a drummer instead. She accepted but stayed with them for a brief time. She never played an instrument before and fell in love with the drums. Palmolive soon joined a band called the Flowers of Romance, but after rejecting the advances of Sid Vicious who was its leader, he kicked her out of the band at the very next practice session. Palmolive was determined to start a band composed only of women, because she "didn't want to be playing music and writing songs and have that be dependent on whether or not I sleep with a guy."

Palmolive attended one of Patti Smith's October 1976 shows at the Hammersmith Odeon in London. There she saw 14-year-old Ari Up throwing a tantrum, decided she'd be a great person to front a new band, and asked her to join her band that same night. Ari immediately agreed. Palmolive next asked Kate Korus, whom she knew from the time of the 101'ers, to play guitar in the band; she too agreed. The three were joined by bassist Suzy Gutsy to form the first version of the Slits. On 17 January 1977, the English tabloid News of the World published the first article about female punks in London. The Slits were featured, along with the Castrators, another all-female band. Things were not working with Suzy, so Palmolive and Ari asked the Castrator's bassist, Tessa Pollitt, to join them.

The Slits, now including Tessa, performed their first gig at the Harlesden Coliseum in London on 11 March 1977 along with the Buzzcocks, Subway Sect, and the Clash. Vivien Goldman's review in Sounds proclaimed that the group had "PRESENCE". Ari's "unfettered vocal frenzy" coupled with Palmolive's "fierce percussive pounding" and the overall freedom and wildness of the band's musical and physical performance took the audience by surprise. Joe Strummer and Mick Jones (of the Clash) said Kate didn't look cool and proposed to replace her with Viv Albertine, Mick's girlfriend. Paloma agreed, and Viv joined the band.

The Slits gained immediate attention and soon opened for the Clash's 1977 White Riot tour. Palmolive's passionate drumming was key to the overall brashness of the group's performances. The group's audacity – on-stage and in the street – was met by violence from men offended by their refusal of traditionally feminine attitudes and attire.

The Slits' raucous on-stage behaviour belied the democratic way they wrote their songs. Members would bring lyrics, then create the music collaboratively, exchanging ideas, and devising arrangements together. Palmolive wrote the lyrics to several of the Slits' initial songs, including "Number One Enemy", "Shoplifting", "New Town", "FM", and "Adventures Close to Home".

By the time that these songs were recorded for release on the Slits' first album, Cut (1979), Palmolive was no longer in the band. She was unhappy due to tensions with the rest of the band over management and creative decisions. Disagreements built up and she was kicked out of the band just before they signed a contract with Island Records. She later claimed that the disagreements included posing nude on the cover of Cut. but Viv Albertine said Palmolive had been asked to leave the band several months previously. Her drumming, along with some of the songs she wrote while with the band, can be heard on the group's 1977 and 1978 John Peel Sessions.

In November 1978, Palmolive appeared as drummer with Spizzoil in a gig at the Hammersmith Odeon, then soon joined her friend Gina Birch and Ana DaSilva in the Raincoats. Palmolive recruited violinist Vicky Aspinall into the group by hanging an ad in Compendium Books, a "centre for alternative thinkers". Her drumming is characterized by Raincoats biographer Jenn Pelly as "more like painting, abstract-expressionist, not at all like a metronome." It fitted well with the band's non-linear, non-hierarchical approach to making music. Palmolive played on the Raincoats initial EP and their first album, The Raincoats, considered a "feminine response to rock'n'roll hegemony." She drummed for the Raincoats on a UK tour with Rough Trade labelmates Kleenex (later renamed LiliPUT after Kimberly-Clark, the manufacturer of the tissue paper brand, threatened legal action) in 1979.

== Post-punk life ==
Palmolive left the Raincoats after that tour for a pilgrimage to India with her friend Dave McLardy. The couple moved to Spain, then back to England before relocating to the United States, where they have lived in Cape Cod, Massachusetts, since 1989. At her arrival she joined a controversial right-wing Pentecostal church named Victory Chapel in Hyannis until leaving a few years later after recognizing the church's troubling characteristics.

Palmolive, no longer involved with organized religion, still embraces Jesus. She considers herself to be a "punk mystic", an identity that influences her outlook on life and her deep concern for social welfare and environmental issues. In a July 2021 interview on the BBC World Service programme Outlook, she refers to herself as a Quaker. She has taught Spanish to children in public and private schools on Cape Cod for over 16 years, having earned a BA in American Studies from Lesley University along with teacher certification.

Palmolive's influence on punk and her role as an inspiration for women in music is chronicled in the documentary film Here to Be Heard: The Story of the Slits, Jenn Pelly's book The Raincoats, part of the 33 1/3 books series and the God Save the Queens: Pioneras del Punk. Palmolive participates in frequent Q&A sessions at screenings of the film and other events, and was part of a keynote panel about women and music at the 2018 Pop Conference held at the Museum of Pop Culture in Seattle, Washington. She appeared in the 2019 four-part Epix documentary Punk, and is working on her autobiography.

== See also ==
- Women in punk rock
