= Peer pressure (disambiguation) =

Peer pressure refers to a process of social influence on an individual.

Peer pressure may also refer to:

- Peer Pressure (game show), American TV production
- "Peer Pressure", song by L Devine
- "Peer Pressure" (James Bay song), featuring Julia Michaels, 2019
- "Peer Pressure" (Mobb Deep song), 1992
- "Peer Pressure", a song by De La Soul from the 2001 album AOI: Bionix
- "Peer Pressure", a song by Pretty Ricky from the 2007 album Late Night Special
- "Peer Pressure", a 1979 song by Necros
- "Peer Pressure", a song by the Slits from the 2009 album Trapped Animal

== See also ==
- Pier Pressure (disambiguation)
