= Palmolive =

Palmolive may refer to:

- Colgate-Palmolive, the company associated with Palmolive brand soap
- Palmolive (brand), a soap brand owned by Colgate-Palmolive
- Palmolive (musician) or Paloma Romero (born 1955), Spanish-born drummer
