= Superfast =

Superfast may refer to:

== Arts and entertainment ==
- Superfast!, a 2015 film
- Superfast (album), by Dynamite Hack, 2000
- "Superfast", a 2014 song by Hollie Cook on the album Twice

== Other uses ==
- Superfast broadband, using optical fiber to provide all or part of the local loop used for last mile telecommunications
- Superfast Ferries, a Greece-based ferry company
- Superfast Express trains in India, Indian Railways
- Ferrari 812 Superfast
- Superfast brand of die cast model cars, similar to Mattel's Hot Wheels, introduced by Matchbox in the late 1960s
