= The Flowers of Romance (British band) =

British punk rock band (1976–1977)

- Origin: London, England
- Genres: Punk rock
- Years active: 1976–1977
- Past members: Sid Vicious; Steve Walsh; Viv Albertine; Keith Levene; Palmolive; Sarah Hall; Jo Faull; Marco Pirroni; Kenny Morris

The Flowers of Romance was an early punk band, formed in mid-1976 by Jo Faull and Sarah Hall, girlfriends at the time of Steve Jones and Paul Cook of the Sex Pistols. The band did not release any recordings and, like London SS and Masters of the Backside, are more famed for the number of band members that later became well known, including: Sid Vicious of the Sex Pistols, Keith Levene (an early member of the Clash and later of Public Image Ltd), Palmolive and Viv Albertine of the Slits, and Kenny Morris (future member of Siouxsie and the Banshees). Morris replaced Palmolive on drums in the last months of the band's existence in late 1976. The band ended in January 1977 when Vicious joined Sex Pistols and Morris rehearsed with Siouxsie. Despite never playing live, they were interviewed by SKUM fanzine in which Sid Vicious proclaimed "I'll just be the yob that I am now".

The highly controversial song "Belsen Was a Gas", about the Nazi concentration camp Bergen-Belsen, was written for this band by Vicious and Levene. Commenting on Vicious writing the tune, guitarist Keith Levene has stated, "Sid always used to have some catchphrase he found funny. He used to go on and on, 'Hey Keith, you know Belsen was a gas' ... So I said, 'Belsen was a gas huh? Well, I'll show you Belsen was a gas; THIS is how it goes man.' and I banged out the riff to the tune, which later The Pistols covered. PIL also played it too. We were nihilists in a way, but we were never political in any conventional sense of that word. What we truly were was nihilists, destructive nihilists, but we weren't pessimistic ... We were interested in the ruins, the destruction, but then we were interested in what we could build out of the rubble. What light could come out of the darkness?" It was performed live by the Sex Pistols, Public Image Ltd, and Sid Vicious' solo act.

The band's name was suggested by Johnny Rotten, and subsequently became the title of an early Sex Pistols song, as well as a 1981 Public Image Ltd album and its title track. Viv Albertine wrote "So Tough" for the band, with the song eventually appearing on the Slits' debut album Cut.

== Personnel ==
- Sid Vicious – vocals, guitar, saxophone
- Keith Levene – guitar
- Viv Albertine – guitar
- Jo Faull – guitar
- Marco Pirroni – guitar (very briefly)
- Steve Walsh - guitar
- Sarah "Rouge" Hall – bass
- Steve Spittle - bass
- Palmolive – drums
- Kenny Morris - drums
