= Mike "Prince Fatty" Pelanconi =

Anglo-Italian music producer

Prince Fatty
- Also known as: Prince Fatty
- Born: Michael Alexis Pelanconi; Cuckfield, Sussex, England
- Genres: Reggae, dub, hip-hop, rock, pop, ska
- Occupations: Record producer; audio engineer; disc jockey
- Years active: 1990–present
- Labels: Lovedub Limited, Mr Bongo, Tropical Dope, Evergreen Recordings, VP Records, ORG, Delicious Vinyl.
- Website: https://www.princefatty.co.uk

Mike Pelanconi – better known by the musical alias Prince Fatty – is an Anglo-Italian record producer and audio engineer.

== Early life and career ==
Pelanconi was born in the South East of England, to an English mother and Italian father. He spent much of his childhood in Italy, before moving to Brighton and then London as a teenager, ultimately working as a recording engineer in the music studios of Soho.

In the late 1990s, then in his 20s, he moved to Los Angeles and worked with various hip-hop and soul acts, before returning to work in Europe.

== Origin of the Prince Fatty name ==
In 2005, Stüssy created a clothing line inspired by the vivid styles of Jamaica to celebrate their 25th anniversary. They hired musicians to create a limited-edition musical single to complement it.

Pelanconi was part of this group, which included Nasser Bouzida and Trevor Harding of Big Boss Man. They chose the new artist name Prince Fatty as a reference to King Tubby.

The instrumental track they wrote and recorded for Stüssy, Nina's Dance, was unexpectedly successful, getting airplay on BBC Radio 1. It was named after Pelanconi's then-partner, the mother of his child.

== Survival of the Fattest ==
Subsequently, Pelanconi used the name for a full-length album, produced by him, called Survival of the Fattest.

For this, he assembled a "supergroup" of reggae greats, including afrobeat saxophonist Bukky Leo, drummer Style Scott from the Roots Radics, Nostalgia 77's horn section, and Hammond organ by Bubblers from Ruff Cut Band. Guest vocals were provided by Hollie Cook, singer from The Slits and daughter of former Sex Pistols drummer Paul Cook, as well as Winston Francis, and Little Roy.

The album was recorded on vintage analogue equipment to preserve the signature sound of reggae and dub records. Pelanconi also strove to update the sound by speeding up tempos and attempting to push the boundaries of classic dub and reggae by referencing the modern influences of hip-hop (especially evident in the cover of Dr. Dre and Snoop Dogg's "Gin and Juice", as well as Ol' Dirty Bastard's "Shimmy Shimmy Ya").

== Supersize ==
This was followed in 2010 by the album Supersize, featuring vocals from Little Roy, Dennis Alcapone, Natty and Winston Francis.

== Prince Fatty vs The Drunken Gambler ==
In 2012 album Prince Fatty Versus the Drunken Gambler included a guest appearance from Dennis Alcapone.

== Use of technology ==
Prince Fatty is noted for his use of interesting and often analogue studio equipment. In an interview with audio and music publication MusicnGear, Pelanconi said that the primary DAW he works in is Pro Tools; stating 'I love the vari-speed function as it works like a tape machine – speeding music up and down can yield interesting results'. He also said that his favorite plugins so far are SSL plugins.

== Collaborators ==
Prince Fatty has often collaborated with, or produced, other artists, including Horseman, Bubblers from the Ruff Cut Band, Shniece McMenamin, Hollie Cook, The Mutant Hi-Fi, Mungo's Hifi, Panteón Rococó and Stick Figure.

== Discography ==
N.B. This discography is incomplete.

=== Albums ===
- The Best of Prince Fatty (2005), Anvil
- Survival of the Fattest (2007) Mr Bongo
- Supersize (2010), Mr Bongo
- Return of Gringo! (2011), Mr Bongo
- Prince Fatty Versus the Drunken Gambler (2012), Mr Bongo
- Prince Fatty vs. Mungo's Hi-Fi (2014), Mr Bongo
- In The Viper's Shadow (2019), Evergreen
- Artikal Intelligence (2024), Lovedub Limited

=== Singles ===
- Nina's Dance – 7″ (Stüssy, 2006)
- Milk & Honey ft. Hollie Cook – 7″/CD/MP3 (Mr Bongo, 2007)
- Milk & Honey 100% Dubstepper vs Moodyboyz – 12″/MP3 (Mr Bongo, 2007)
- Scorpio / Roof Over My Head – 7″/MP3 (Mr Bongo, 2008)
- Shimmy Shimmy Ya / Gin & Juice – 7″/MP3 (Mr Bongo, 2009)
- Insane in the Brain – 7″/MP3 (Mr Bongo, 2010)
- Christopher Columbus ft. Little Roy / Dry Your Tears ft. Winston Francis – 7″ (Mr Bongo, 2010)
- Sliver/Dive ft. Little Roy (covers of Nirvana songs) – 7" (ARK, 2011)
- Black Rabbit with Shniece McMenamin ( A cover of White Rabbit by Jefferson Airplane )(Evergreen Recordings 2020)
