= Howard Thompson =

Howard Thompson may refer to:

- Howard Thompson (film critic) (1919–2002), film critic for The New York Times
- Howard Thompson (wargame designer), game designer and owner of Metagaming Concepts
- Howard Thompson (music executive) (born 1953), American music executive
- Howard Anthony Thompson (1964–2025), English-born American hip-hop DJ known as Howie Tee
