= Nora Forster =

German-British music promoter (1942–2023)

- Born: Nora Maier; 6 November 1942; Munich, Germany
- Died: 6 April 2023 (aged 80); United States
- Citizenship: Germany; United Kingdom
- Occupations: Publishing heiress; actress; model; music promoter
- Spouses: Frank Forster; John Lydon (m. 1979)
- Children: Ari Up
- Father: Franz Karl Maier

Nora Maier Forster (née Maier; 6 November 1942 – 6 April 2023) was a German-British music promoter, publishing heiress, actress, and model. Before moving to London in the late 1960s, she worked in West Germany with Jimi Hendrix, Wishbone Ash, and Yes. In London, she helped to financially support the punk bands the Slits, the Sex Pistols, and the Clash. She was married to John Lydon of the Sex Pistols.

== Early life ==
Nora Maier Forster was born 6 November 1942 in Munich, Germany, to a wealthy publishing family. Her father, Franz Karl Maier, worked as a "prosecutor who helped bring wartime Nazis to justice." After the end of World War II, her father was the editor and publisher of the newspaper Der Tagesspiegel.

Forster was educated in Munich and was interested in music from an early age. After she finished school, she went to work for her father's media company. After the death of her father, she reportedly inherited a large fortune as heir to Der Tagesspiegel, but Lydon claims otherwise.

== Career ==
Forster began her work as a music promoter in Munich. Her home there became a meeting place for "rock royalty". Some of the acts she worked with in West Germany were Jimi Hendrix, Wishbone Ash, and Yes. She found German society to be too restricting and decided to move to London with her daughter in the latter half of the 1960s.

Their first flat was located in a "cold, damp and dark" basement in West London, near the Chelsea football ground. Following that, they moved to a small house off Gowrie Road in South London. During this time she came to be called a "Punk Mummy Warrior" who guided her daughter Ari Up's musical pursuits and supported the development of her band, the Slits, when Ari was just fourteen or fifteen.

Forster hosted numerous musician house guests and among them was Neneh Cherry, the teenage step-daughter of Don Cherry. Cherry performed backing vocals with the Slits for a time. Rock journalist and historian Vivien Goldman stated that Forster was "a den mother to all the young punks."

During the 1960s and 1970s, Forster was part of the bohemian scene in London. Starting in the late 1960s, Forster's home in Shepherd's Bush became a crash pad, salon, and meeting place for rock musicians including Joe Strummer of the Clash, Jimi Hendrix, Jon Anderson of the band Yes, and many other bands.

She helped to financially support the punk bands the Slits, the Sex Pistols, and the Clash.

In 1970, Forster began to promote music gatherings in London.

In 1986, she was a major stockholder of Der Tagesspiegel, a West Berlin–based newspaper.

== Personal life ==
Forster's first husband was Frank Forster, a West German popular music singer, with whom she had a daughter, Ariane, better known as Ari Up, who was the frontwoman and singer of the Slits. In 2000, Forster and Lydon became guardians of Ari Up's two sons; after Ari Up's death in 2010 from breast cancer, they took over the care of her third child as well.

In 1975, Forster met John Lydon of the Sex Pistols in west London at Vivienne Westwood's clothing store, Sex, on the Kings Road. The store was co-owned at the time by rock impresario Malcolm McLaren who managed the Sex Pistols. Many sources claim Forster married Lydon, who was 14 years her junior, in Düsseldorf in 1979, but later Lydon claimed they were never married. Forster and Lydon moved to California in the 1980s. In 1988, Forster and Lydon were booked to travel on 21 December Pan Am Flight 103 that was destroyed by a bomb over Lockerbie, but missed the flight due to packing delays. They remained married for 44 years until her death in 2023.

Previously, she was the girlfriend of musician and producer Chris Spedding.

Forster was diagnosed with Alzheimer's disease in 2018. She lived in Venice Beach, Los Angeles, with Lydon, who was her full-time caregiver when he was not on tour. In February 2023, Lydon entered Eurosong 2023 as part of Public Image Ltd with the song "Hawaii", a song dedicated to Forster.

Her death was announced on 6 April 2023; she was 80.
