= Yolande Brener =

English author and actress

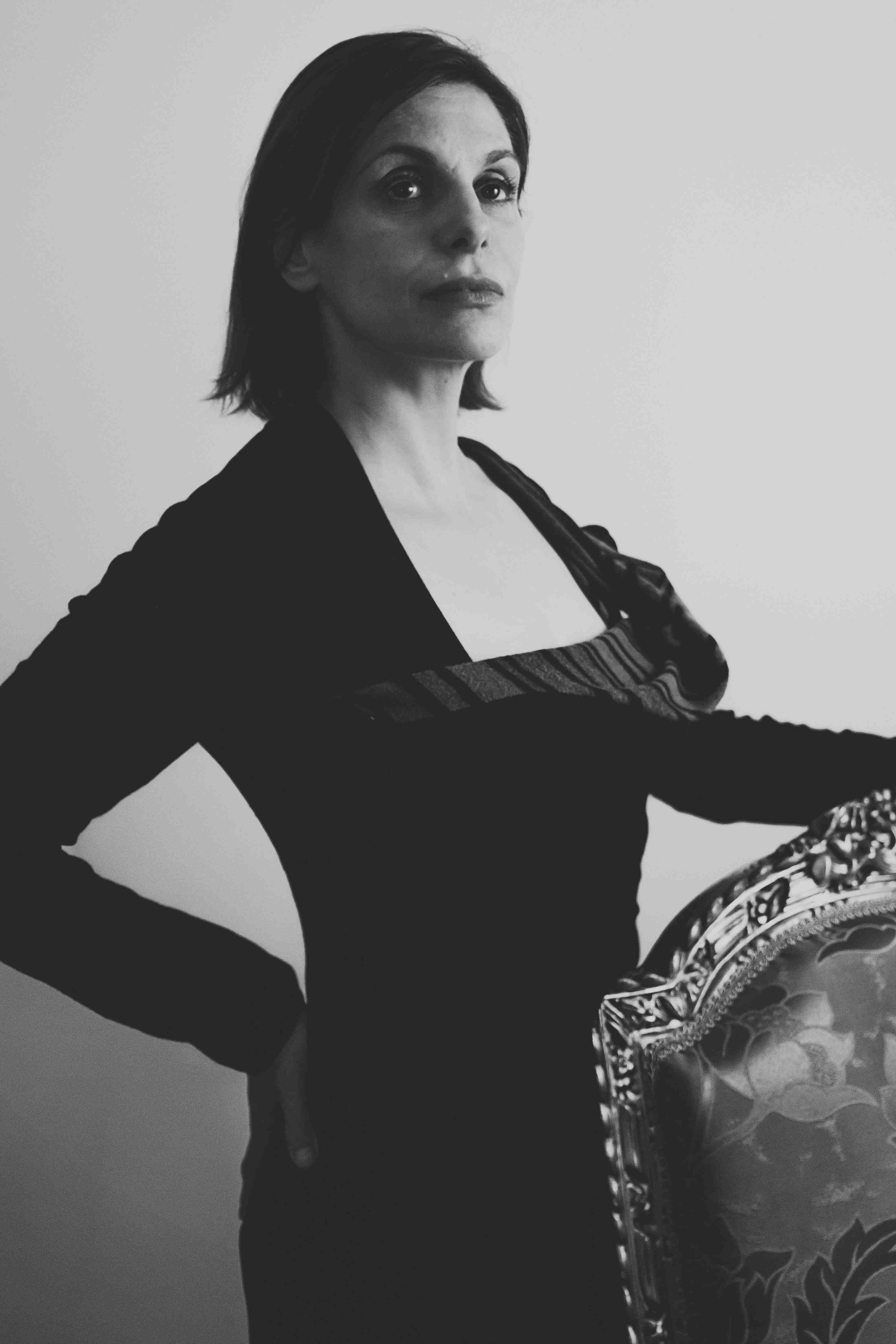
- Education: University of East London
- Occupations: Writer, actress
- Notable work: Holy Candy: Why I Joined A Cult And Married a Stranger
- Website: www.yolandebrener.com

Yolande Brener is an English author and actress known for her memoir, Holy Candy: Why I Joined A Cult And Married a Stranger, and for her literary journalism.

== Personal life and career ==
Brener grew up in Old Windsor in Berkshire, and thereafter moved to London. There she attained a Bachelor of Arts in Fine Art from University of East London and an Advanced Certificate in Film and Video Making from Central Saint Martins.

During this time Brener appeared as an actress in films including Peter Greenaway's The Cook, the Thief, His Wife, and Her Lover, Derek Jarman's The Garden, and Viv Albertine's Coping with Cupid for which she co-wrote the script. Brener appeared in pop videos including Boy George's Everything I Own, The Smiths' The Queen is Dead, Pop Will Eat Itself's Def Con One, and The Band of Holy Joy's Tactless.

Between 1988 and 1990, Brener worked in multimedia performance group, Golden Syrup. In 1990, while working on a documentary called Soul Searching, Brener met a member of the Unification Church, otherwise known as The Moonies. Brener moved into the Unification Church as a member, and was transplanted to New York City in 1991. Brener was married in the 1992 30,000 Couples Holy Blessing Ceremony in Seoul, Korea. This experience inspired her memoir, Holy Candy.

She is a contributor to Harlem World Magazine among other publications. Her short story, The Swan Sister is featured in Seal Press's Beyond Belief: The Secret Lives of Women In Extreme Religions.

=== Filmography ===
Year	Title
1989	The Cook, the Thief, His Wife & Her Lover
1990	The Garden
1991	Coping with Cupid

=== Publications ===
- Holy Candy: Why I Joined A Cult And Married A Stranger, 2014, Holy Crack Publishing, ISBN 9780692215173
- Beyond Belief: The Secret Lives of Women in Extreme Religions by Cami Ostman, 2013, Seal Press, ASIN B00DEK1URU

== Awards and accolades ==
Yolande Brener won the 2010 NYC Parks Department Poems in the Park Award, and won First Place in the Writer's Digest Self-Published e-Book Awards for her memoir, Holy Candy.
