= Howard Thompson (music executive) =

American radio DJ

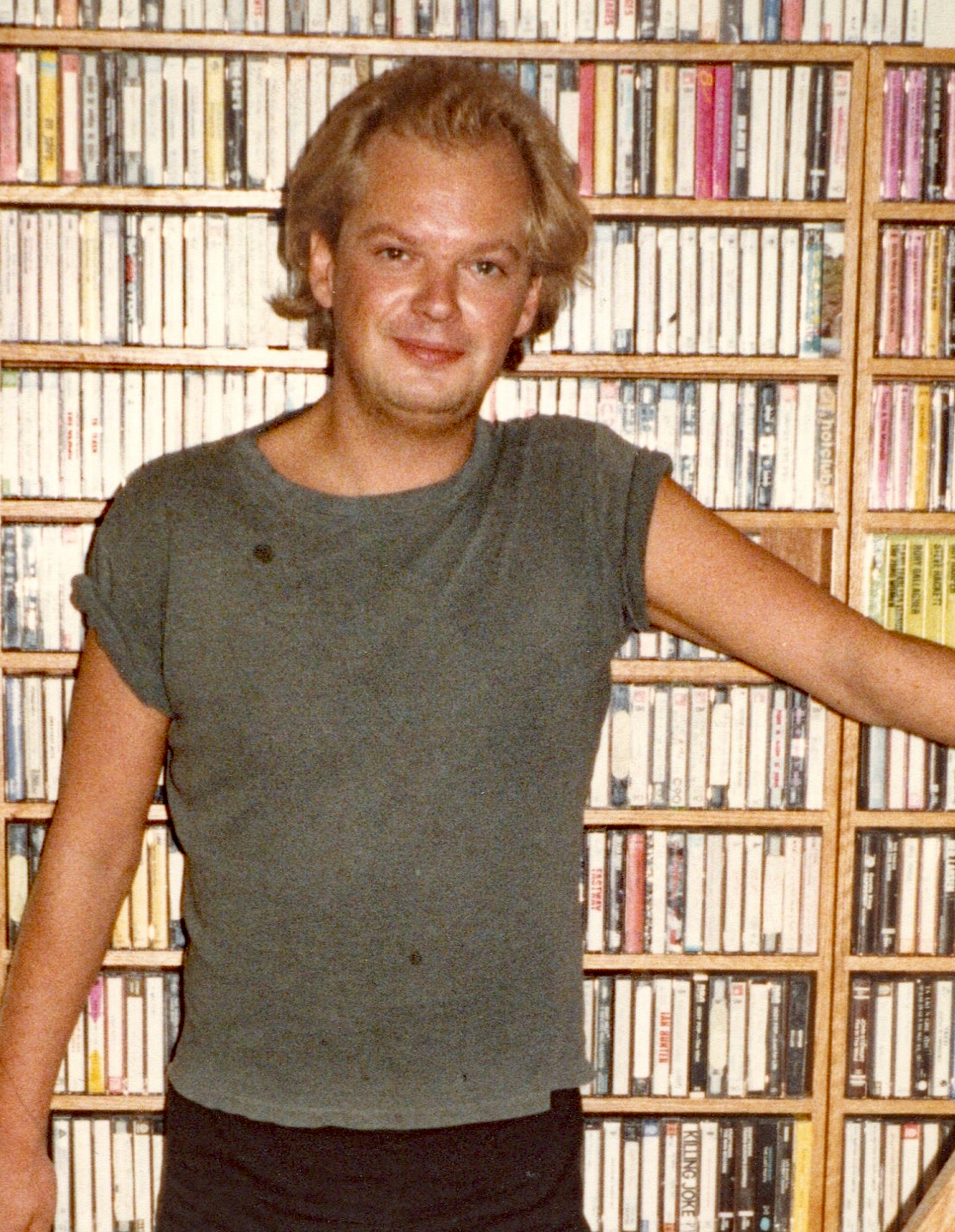

Background information
- Born: Howard Hillary Thompson; 3 June 1953 (age 73); Kendal, Cumbria, England
- Occupations: A&R executive, radio disc-jockey
- Years active: 1971 - Present
- Labels: Island; Bronze Records; Columbia; Elektra; Almo Sounds

Howard Thompson (born 3 June 1953, Kendal, Cumbria, England) is an American radio DJ, on-air personality and former A&R man. During his time as an A&R man, he discovered, signed and was associated with The Psychedelic Furs, Aswad, Happy Mondays, Adam & The Ants, Suicide, The Sisters of Mercy, Motörhead, The Slits, 10,000 Maniacs, Billy Bragg, and Roky Erickson.

In 2010, Thompson became an on-air personality as DJ and the music director for the Bridgeport, Connecticut radio station WPKN. He was described by New York magazine as an "A&R legend".

== 1971 – 1981: Trident Studios, Island, Bronze, CBS Records (UK) ==
In 1971, Thompson began his music business career at Trident Studios in London initially as tea-boy, then advancing to tape-copying, editing, and disc cutting. During this time, albums by Lou Reed (Transformer), Elton John (Madman Across the Water), Genesis (Nursery Cryme), David Bowie (Hunky Dory, The Rise and Fall of Ziggy Stardust), Van Der Graaf Generator (Pawn Hearts) and Mott the Hoople (All the Young Dudes) were being recorded there.

In 1974, Thompson was appointed A&R scout at Island Records. His first signing was Eddie and the Hot Rods whose 1977 hit, "Do Anything You Wanna Do" was at the intersection of pub rock and punk. He convinced the MC5's Rob Tyner to collaborate with the Hot Rods on the single, "Til The Night Is Gone (Let's Rock)."

While at Island, Thompson compiled the critically acclaimed John Cale retrospective Guts, a collection of Cale's most aggressive tracks. In 1976, Thompson was instrumental in arranging Island's distribution of Stiff Records beginning with the October 1976 release of the U.K.'s first punk rock single, The Damned's "New Rose." In 1977, Thompson's signing of the Snivelling Shits to Island subsidiary, Ghetto Rockers, ran into difficulties when EMI workers 'downed tools' midway through pressing the band's debut single, "Terminal Stupid/I Can't Come" forcing the remaining discs to be manufactured in France.

Thompson was instrumental in Island's release of the first Tom Petty album, leaking the album to a music critic and convincing the label's general manager not to release a cannibalized EP. While at Island, Thompson licensed Hard Attack, the debut album from Hoosier noise-rockers MX-80 Sound.

In 1978, Thompson joined former Island partner David Betteridge, at Bronze Records, a UK indie label known for artists such as Uriah Heep and Manfred Mann's Earth Band. Thompson and Betteridge transformed Bronze into a home for adventurous, eclectic musicians such as Motörhead, Sally Oldfield, and Suicide. Every other British label had rejected Motörhead until Thompson witnessed the band's rabid following at a show at Dingwalls. Lemmy Kilmister, Motörhead's leader, acknowledged that Thompson's signing turned out to be "the beginning of our long-awaited upward ascent." Similarly, Sally Oldfield's recording, Water Bearer, now considered "one of the most refreshing examples of nature-oriented progressive music of any era, "had been rejected by "every single record company in London" until Thompson heard Oldfield's demos and signed her to Bronze. Suicide had difficulty finding distribution for their self-titled debut album. After listening to the album, Thompson flew to New York to negotiate a licensing deal. The album failed to chart in both the United States and the United Kingdom. Thompson's unwavering support of the band led him to record many of their shows, including a hostile 1978 performance in Brussels that turned into a riot. It was subsequently released as an 'official bootleg,' a free Flexi-disk accompanying Red Star's re-release of their debut and then as a bonus track ("23 Minutes In Brussels") in the 1998 re-release of their debut on Blast First Records. While at Bronze, Thompson licensed the self-titled debut from Boston-based The Real Kids and signed actor/crooner Billy Hamon, using three-fourths of Dire Straits as his backing band for their first outside session.

Thompson left Bronze at the end of 1978 and spent the next three years as A&R manager at CBS Records (UK) in London, where he "developed a reputation by signing experimental but commercial post-punk acts ... "Of these, Thompson signed the Psychedelic Furs who had been recommended to him. Convinced of the band's importance, Thompson persuaded Muff Winwood, head of CBS A&R, and David Betteridge, managing director to sign them to CBS Records UK. Singer Richard Butler later said," [W]e actually have it on tape, Muff leaning over Howard's shoulder saying, "Yeah, sign them, sign them." The Furs' albums and singles regularly reached into the Top 20 in the U.S. and U.K., but they would, like many of Thompson's signings, "have more impact on future musicians than they ever did in the marketplace." Other post-punk acts that Thompson signed were New Math (Die Trying), The Slits (The Return of the Giant Slits), whose guitarist, Viv Albertine, had attended the same Muswell Hill primary school with Thompson, Aswad (New Chapter), Susan Fassbender ("Twilight Cafe"), and proto-punk legend Roky Erickson (Roky Erickson and the Aliens). Thompson's most savvy signing was Adam Ant, who was then at a career nadir after both the Decca and Do It record labels failed to exercise their option to continue with the musician. Despite being considered "spoiled meat" within the industry, Thompson persuaded Muff Winwood and David Betteridge to sign them after seeing the group and their fans, the "Antpeople" at the Empire Ballroom, Leicester Square.

== 1982 – 1999: Columbia Records, Elektra Entertainment, Almo Sounds (US) ==
Following the global success of Adam Ant, in early 1982 Thompson transferred from CBS UK to Columbia Records' headquarters in New York City. During his two years at Columbia, he brought several CBS UK signings to Columbia for U.S. distribution, including Paul Young, Fastway, Yellowman, and Wham!. Head of CBS International, Dick Asher, signed Ian Hunter and asked Thompson to A&R the project (All of the Good Ones Are Taken).

In 1984, Thompson was appointed VP/Head of A&R East Coast by Bob Krasnow, Chairman of Elektra Records, after which he was promoted to Senior VP, Head of A&R. Under Thompson, Elektra released albums by Benjamin Orr, Elliot Easton, The Cars, Björk, Alan Vega, Billy Bragg, The Call, John Campbell, Graham Parker, the Cure, Scatterbrain, and others. He introduced to the label: 10,000 Maniacs, the Sisters of Mercy, the Faith Healers, guitar virtuoso Danny Gatton, Sara Hickman and with Kevin Patrick, The Georgia Satellites and The Screaming Blue Messiahs. Thompson expanded the international roster with releases by The Gipsy Kings and was the A&R for six albums by musician, activist, actor, and Panamanian Presidential candidate, Rubén Blades. He licensed Happy Mondays from Factory Records and with David Field licensed The Sugarcubes/Björk and The Heartthrobs from One Little Indian.

After leaving Elektra in 1993, Thompson joined Herb Alpert and Jerry Moss (founders of A&M Records) to form Almo Sounds, where he ran the A&R department. He brought a varied group of artists to the label, including alt-accordion-rocker Angel Corpus Christi, Tim Wheater, The Rakes Progress, the Prissteens, Victor DeLorenzo and ManBreak. Thompson hired Bob Bortnick, who brought Garbage and The Pulsars to the label and recommended Will Calhoun and Doug Wimbish of Living Colour as producers for Herb Alpert's Colors album.

== 1999 - present: The Star Spangles, WPKN ==
After leaving Almo Sounds in 1999, Thompson announced his retirement but returned in 2002 as manager of Lower East Side punk rock band, The Star Spangles, after seeing the band perform at Arlene's Grocery. The band was signed to a recording deal with Capitol, releasing two albums, Bazooka!!! and Dirty Bomb and toured U.S. Japan and Europe.

In 2010, WPKN, a 10,000-watt radio station in Bridgeport, Connecticut, solicited Thompson to take a position as DJ. The following year he was appointed music director at WPKN, where he hosts the radio show "Pure".

Thompson executive-produced the documentary, "The MC5 * A True Testimonial," but following 16 years of litigation, the film remains unreleased. In 2023, photos and footage from Thompson's archives were included in the Danny Gatton documentary, "The Humbler."
