= Twice (Hollie Cook album) =

Studio album by Hollie Cook
- Released: 12 May 2014
- Recorded: The Ironworks, Brighton, 2013
- Genre: Reggae
- Length: 43:28
- Label: Mr Bongo
- Producer: Mike "Prince Fatty" Pelanconi

Hollie Cook chronology
| Holly Cook (2012) | Twice (2014) | Vessel of Love (2018) |

Professional ratings
Aggregate scores
| Source | Rating |
|---|---|
| Metacritic | 75/100 |
Review scores
| Source | Rating |
| AllMusic | 3.5/5 stars |
| Exclaim! | 8/10 |
| The Irish Times | 3/5 stars |
| Mojo | 4/5 stars |
| NME | 8/10 |
| PopMatters | 7/10 |
| Q | 3/5 stars |
| Tom Hull – on the Web | B+ |
| Uncut | 7/10 |

Twice is a studio album by the singer Hollie Cook. It was released on 12 May 2014, through Mr Bongo Records.

== Critical reception ==
AllMusic wrote that the album "follows in the same path as [Cook's] debut, featuring nine tracks dominated by Cook's smooth, slyly sexy voice and arrangements that keep the grooves light but dance-friendly at once."

== Track listing ==
All tracks are written by Hollie Cook, Barthélémy Corbelet and Mike Pelanconi

| No. | Title | Writer(s) | Length |
|---|---|---|---|
| 1. | "Ari Up" | | 4:10 |
| 2. | "99" | | 6:24 |
| 3. | "Desdemona" | | 4:15 |
| 4. | "Tiger Balm" | | 4:06 |
| 5. | "Postman" | | 4:12 |
| 6. | "Looking for Real Love" | music: Dennis Bovell, George Dekker, Mike Pelanconi, Winston Francis | 6:02 |
| 7. | "Superfast" | | 4:30 |
| 8. | "Twice" | | 4:52 |
| 9. | "Win Or Lose" | | 4:31 |

== Personnel ==
According to the booklet.

Musicians

- Adriano Adewale - percussion
- Alfred Bannerman - guitars
- Anselmo Netto - percussion
- Barthélémy Corbelet - synthesizer, Clavinet, string arrangements
- Black Steel - bass, guitars, organ, piano
- Bubblers - organ piano
- Catriona Cannon - Irish harp
- Cyrus "Monkites" Richard - organ, piano
- Dennis Bovell - backing vocals
- Dub Judah - bass
- George Dekker - backing vocals
- Winston "Horseman" Williams - drums, percussion
- Jahmel Ellison - bass
- Kashta Tafari - guitars
- K.V. BALAKRISHNAN - tabla
- Lenny Edwards - percussion
- Leroy Horns - saxophone
- Marlon Roudette - steel pan
- Omar Lye Fook - synthesizer, Clavinet
- Prince Fatty - percussion
- Winston Francis - backing vocals
- Yohan - string arrangements

Recording

- Boban Apostolov - Protools engineer
- Evtim Ristov - stage manager
- Georgii Hristovski - sound engineer
- Oleg Kontradenko - conductor
- Riste Trajkovski - stage manager
- Yoann Le Dantec - arrangements; orchestration

F.A.M.E.'S. Project - Macedonian Radio
Symphonic Orchestra and Choir - Skopje, Macedonia

== Charts ==
Twice peaked at position 6 on Billboard Reggae Albums chart and stayed on the chart for 11 weeks.
