= Pier Pressure =

Pier Pressure may refer to:

- Pier Pressure (album), by Chesapeake, 1997
- Pier Pressure (audio drama), a 2006 Doctor Who audio drama
- Pier Pressure (festival), a music festival held in Gothenburg, Sweden
- Pier Pressure (mixtape), by ArrDee, 2022
- "Pier Pressure" (Arrested Development), a season one episode of Arrested Development
- "Pier Pressure", a season one episode of Ben 10: Alien Force

== See also ==
- Peer Pressure (disambiguation)
- No Pier Pressure, a 2015 studio album by Brian Wilson
