= Coping with Cupid =

- Directed by: Viviane Albertine
- Written by: Viviane Albertine; Yolande Brener; Fiona Dennison; Sarah Miles
- Produced by: Sophie Martinez
- Starring: Yolande Brener; Fiona Denison; Melissa Milo; Sean Pertwee
- Edited by: Christine Booth
- Music by: Ben Barson; Kent Brainerd
- Production company: BFI
- Release date: 1991
- Running time: 18 minutes
- Country: United Kingdom
- Language: English

Coping with Cupid is a 1991 short sci-fi romance film written and directed by Viviane Albertine, produced by the British Film Institute.

== Plot ==
Three beautiful blonde aliens are sent to Earth to find the recipe of romantic love in 48 hours. They ask passers-by in Soho and are offered all kinds of responses. This doesn't get them anywhere and they're in danger of being trapped in loneliness.

== Cast ==
- Yolande Brener as Blonde 1
- Fiona Dennison as Blonde 2
- Melissa Milo as Blonde 3
- Sean Pertwee as Peter
- Liz Greene as woman in street
- John Kobal as man in hallway
- Ros Coward as woman in doorway
- Lucy Goodison as voice on Walkman
- P. Hildebrand as man in wardrobe
- Richard Jobson as man at photo booth
- Don Letts as man on train
- Shere Hite as woman on TV
- Lorelei King as Captain Trulove (voice)
- Hetty Baynes as blondes (voice)
