= Masters of the Backside =

UK musical group

Masters of the Backside was an early British punk rock group. They never released a recording or performed beyond practice sessions, but the group's members went on to greater success: Chrissie Hynde later fronted The Pretenders, and Dave Vanian, Captain Sensible and Rat Scabies were subsequently founding members of The Damned.

The band was formed by future Sex Pistols manager Malcolm McLaren, who wanted to create a band with the sound of Ramones and the style of former Television member Richard Hell, both of whom he had seen perform at CBGB. He initially intended the band to have two singers.

The band is only known to have performed once, before a small invited audience in a church hall in Lisson Grove, London. They broke up before playing any public concerts or recording any material, after the members became tired of McLaren's need to control their activity. McLaren had more success with his second band, Sex Pistols, and Hynde eventually formed the Pretenders while Vanian, Sensible, and Scabies teamed up with former London SS member Brian James to form The Damned.

Masters of the Backside has since gone on to attain semi-legendary status with punks alongside London SS and The Flowers of Romance.

It is unclear when the band began using the name "Masters of the Backside" as The Damned acknowledge some of their members first performed together in a group with Hynde but they refer to the project as being unnamed, or with Hynde's preferred name Dishonorable Discharge.
