= Vessel of Love =

Studio album by Hollie Cook
- Released: 26 January 2018
- Studio: Space Mountain Studio, Valle de Lecrín, Granada, Andalusia; Meridian Studios, London; Boogie Back Studios, London
- Genre: Reggae
- Length: 39:55
- Label: Merge
- Producer: Youth

Hollie Cook chronology
Twice (2014)	Vessel of Love (2018)

Professional ratings
Aggregate scores
Source	Rating
Metacritic	73/100
Review scores
Source	Rating
AllMusic	4/5 stars
The Arts Desk	3/5 stars
God Is in the TV	7/10
Mojo	4/5 stars
Pitchfork	7.4/10
PopMatters	7/10
Q	3/5 stars
The Skinny	3/5 stars
Uncut	6/10

Vessel of Love is a studio album by reggae musician Hollie Cook. It was released in 2018 via Merge Records.

== Critical reception ==
Pitchfork wrote that Cook "always sounds strong and self-possessed, and that is what most makes Vessel of Love sound like pure joy." PopMatters wrote that "Cook's breezy voice soothes on backdrops of steady brass and lush synths, making for a true tropical retreat."

== Track listing ==
No.	Title	Writer(s)	Length
1.	"Angel Fire"	Hollie Cook, Joe Price, John Wardle, Luke Allwood, Martin Glover, Michael Rendell	4:10
2.	"Stay Alive"	Hollie Cook, John Wardle, Keith Levene, Luke Allwood, Martin Glover, Michael Rendell	4:19
3.	"Survive"	Hollie Cook, James McKone, Joe Price, Luke Allwood, Martin Glover, Michael Rendell	3:18
4.	"Ghostly Fading"	Hollie Cook, James McKone, Joe Price, Luke Allwood, Martin Glover, Michael Rendell	3:58
5.	"Freefalling"	Hollie Cook, James McKone, Joe Price, Luke Allwood, Martin Glover, Michael Rendell	3:38
6.	"Lunar Addiction"	Hollie Cook, Joe Price, John Wardle, Luke Allwood, Martin Glover, Michael Rendell	4:19
7.	"Turn It Around"	Hollie Cook, Daniele Gaudi, John Wardle, Martin Glover, Michael Rendell	4:13
8.	"Vessel of Love"	Hollie Cook, James McKone, Joe Price, Luke Allwood, Martin Glover, Michael Rendell	3:30
9.	"Together"	Hollie Cook, Daniele Gaudi, Hollie Cook, James McKone, Joe Price, Luke Allwood, Martin Glover, Michael Rendell	4:01
10.	"Far From Me"	Hollie Cook, Alex Paterson, Luke Allwood, Martin Glover, Michael Rendell	4:29

== Charts ==
Chart (2018)	Peak position
US Reggae Albums (Billboard)	1
