= The Prefects =

British punk rock band

- Origin: Birmingham, England
- Genres: Punk rock
- Years active: 1976–1979, 2001
- Past members: Robert Lloyd; Alan Apperley; Paul Apperley; Graham Blunt; Adrian Moran; Stephanie Nuttall

The Prefects were a British punk rock band from Birmingham, England, with members that would later form the Nightingales. They were among the first wave of UK punk bands, forming in 1976.

== History ==
In 1976, singer Robert Lloyd, with guitarist/drummer brothers Alan and Paul Apperley formed the Prefects after an advert was placed by the Apperley brothers in the Birmingham Evening Mail. Unsuccessful previous applicants had included Nikki Sudden and Frank Skinner. Lloyd also brought his friend and colleague from the band Church of England, Graham Blunt, into the band. They were Birmingham's first punk group, and played their first gig on 12 March 1977 at a private party which ended in a police raid. At their first gig at a recognized venue (Rebecca's in Birmingham) later that month they were driven off stage by thrown bottles after premiering their new song, "Birmingham's a Shithole".

The band were part of The Clash's 'White Riot Tour' (playing on the bill of four shows), supported Buzzcocks, played with The Slits, The Fall, The Damned and many others. Paul Apperley left the band in February 1978, to be replaced briefly by Stephanie Nuttal (of Manchester band Manicured Noise) and then Adrian Moran. They recorded two sessions for the John Peel radio show in 1978 and 1979. The second of these featuring the band's final lineup with Eamonn Duffy (bass) and Dave Twist (drums) who also played in Birmingham garage / punk band TV Eye. The band acquired legendary status in the UK, partly because no records were released until the band had split up, and then, only one posthumous single ("Motions"/"Things" – from the Peel Sessions) on Rough Trade, which the band agreed to on the condition that Rough Trade record Lloyd's new band the Nightingales. The band briefly reformed to play a few gigs in 2001. In November 2004 (following a semi-official retrospective, The Sound of Tomorrow on Rush Release) a retrospective compilation Amateur Wankers was released by New York City label Acute Records which, twenty five years after the group's demise, garnered praise all over, from webzines to Rolling Stone. The interest was such that a Live in 1978 CD was also released on British label Caroline True in 2005. Their seven-second opus "I've Got V.D." remained a favourite with John Peel.

== Discography ==
=== Singles ===
- "Going Through the Motions"/"Things in General" (1979, Rough Trade/Vindaloo)
- Peel Session EP (2001, Strange Fruit)

=== Albums ===
- The Prefects Are Amateur Wankers (2004) Acute
- Live 1978 – The Co-op Suite Birmingham (2006) Caroline True

== John Peel Radio 1 sessions ==
August 1978:

- Things in General
- Escort Girls
- The Bristol Road Leads to Dachau
- Agony Column

January 1979:

- Going Through the Motions
- Faults
- Total Luck
- Barbarellas
