= The Star Spangles =

- Origin: New York City
- Genres: Rock; Punk
- Years active: 1998–2008, 2015–present
- Labels: Capitol; Tic Records
- Members: Ian Wilson; Tommy Volume; Joey Valentine

The Star Spangles are a four-piece punk band from Manhattan, led by vocalist Ian Wilson. Formed in 1998, they released a single on Spain's Muenster Records in 2000 followed by an album called Bazooka!!! in 2003, which includes the single "Which of the Two of Us is Gonna Burn This House Down?".

After a falling-out with Capitol Records, followed by a line-up change in 2006, the Spangles released their follow-up album, Dirty Bomb, in 2007.

The group dissolved in early 2008, but started playing live again in 2015.

== Members ==
The Star Spangles are:

- Ian Wilson – lead vocals, rhythm guitar
- Tommy Volume – lead guitar, backing vocals
- Joey Valentine – drums, backing vocals

The line-up was:

- Ian Wilson – lead vocals, rhythm guitar
- Nick Price – bass, backing vocals
- Joey Valentine – drums, backing vocals
- Tommy Volume – Lead guitar, backing vocals

== Albums ==
=== Bazooka!!! ===
- Release Date: December 10, 2003
- UK Chart:
- Produced by

CD ():

1. "I Live for the Speed"
2. "Which of the Two of Us is Gonna Burn This House Down?"
3. "Angela"
4. "I Don't Wanna Be Crazy Anymore"
5. "Stay Away from Me"
6. "I'll Get Her Back"
7. "L.A."
8. "Science Fiction/Science Fact"
9. "If We Can't Be Lovers"
10. "In Love Again"
11. "Crime of the Century"
12. "Stain Glass Shoes"
13. "The Party"

=== Dirty Bomb ===
- Release Date: 2007
- Produced by

CD (TR001):

1. "Take Care Of Us"
2. "Tear It To Pieces Girl"
3. "Make Yourself Useful, Babe"
4. "This Side Of The Sun"
5. "Gangland"
6. "I'm On A High"
7. "Gimme An Answer"
8. "Tell Lies"
9. "'Nother Weight To Hold Me Down"
10. "Revolver"
11. "I Told A Lie"
12. "Bash Your Brains Out"
13. "Someone In You"

== Singles ==
=== The Star Spangles ===
- Release Date: 2000
- UK Chart: N/A
- Notes: These are earlier, different recordings from those on Bazooka!!!

7" (7137):

1. "I Can't Be With You"
2. "Get You Back"
3. "The Party"
4. "Science Fiction/Science Fact"

=== Which Of The Two Of Us Is Gonna Burn This House Down? ===
- Release Date: 2002
- UK Chart: 98

7" (R6593):

1. "Which Of The Two Of Us Is Gonna Burn This House Down?"
2. "Stain Glass Shoes"

=== Stay Away From Me ===
- Release Date: 2003
- UK Chart: 52

7" (R6604):

1. "Stay Away From Me"
2. "The Sins Of A Family Fall On The Daughter"

CD ():

1. "Stay Away From Me"
2. "The Sins Of A Family Fall On The Daughter"

=== I Live For Speed ===
- Release Date: 2003
- UK Chart: 60

7" (R6609):

1. "I Live For Speed"
2. "I Feel So Good"

CD ():

1. "I Live For Speed"
2. "I Feel So Good"
