= Cut (The Slits album) =

Studio album by the Slits
- Released: 7 September 1979
- Recorded: 1979
- Studios: Ridge Farm, Rusper, England
- Genres: Post-punk; dub-reggae; art pop
- Length: 31:52
- Label: Island
- Producer: Dennis Bovell

The Slits chronology
Cut (1979)	Bootleg Retrospective (1980)

Cut is the debut studio album by English band the Slits, released on 7 September 1979. It was recorded at Ridge Farm Studios in Rusper, England, and produced by Dennis Bovell.

== Composition ==
Musically, Cut works in an "innovative" fusion of punk and reggae. It also incorporates "restless [and] offbeat" art pop.

== Release and reception ==
Professional ratings
Review scores
Source	Rating
AllMusic	4.5/5 stars
Blender	5/5 stars
Christgau's Record Guide	B+
Pitchfork	9.3/10
Record Collector	5/5 stars
Rolling Stone	3.5/5 stars
The Rolling Stone Album Guide	4/5 stars
Smash Hits	9/10
Sounds	5/5 stars
Spin Alternative Record Guide	10/10

The album was originally released on 7 September 1979 on the Island Records label in the UK and on Antilles in the US. It reached number 30 on the UK album charts at the time. In 2004, it was voted 58th in The Observer's 100 Greatest British Albums list. The album was also included in the book 1001 Albums You Must Hear Before You Die. In 2020, Rolling Stone ranked the album at number 260 in its list of the 500 greatest albums of all time, and the track "Typical Girls" at number 381 in its list of the 500 greatest songs of all time.

Andy Kellman for AllMusic called it "entirely fun and catchy" despite its "less-than-polished nature and street-tough ruggedness". Robert Christgau applauded it, writing that "for once" there was "a white reggae style that rival[ed] its models for weirdness and formal imagination."

Cut's mark has been noted on several musical movements. The Guardian's Lindesay Irvine saw the album explore "adventurous" sonics while maintaining a "defiant" attitude. This included a full embrace of Jamaican music influences, with which he credited the Slits as one of the first bands to do so. Indeed, PopMatters felt that Cut spoke to post-punk's appropriation of dub and reggae clearer than any other of the genre's records. Irvine argued that it inspired later post-punk acts like Culture Club to "[get] their nerve up". PopMatters said that Cut's most influential aspect was singer Ari Up's "wailing vibrato and gnashing power" that would be revamped during the movement.

Cut is credited with shaping the 1990s musical movement riot grrrl. Rolling Stone wrote that the scene's bands Bikini Kill and Sleater-Kinney came to be because of it.

Cut has been appreciated by Kurt Cobain. In his posthumously released journals, Nirvana frontman listed Cut (as "Typical Girls") as one of his 50 favorite records of all time.

=== Accolades ===
Publication	Country	List	Year	Rank	Ref.
Fact	UK	The 100 Best Albums of the 1970s	-	42	
NME	UK	The 500 Greatest Albums of All Time	2013	278	
Paste	US	The 50 Best Post-Punk Albums	2016	11	
PopMatters	US	The Best Post-Punk Albums Ever	2020	4	
Rolling Stone	US	The 500 Greatest Albums of All Time	2020	260	
Treble	US	The Top 100 Post-Punk Albums	2018	24	
Treble	US	The Top 150 Albums of the '70s	2019	132	

== Reissues ==
Cut was re-released on CD in Europe in 1990 and in 2000 within the Island Master series (IMCD 90 and IMCD 275). In 2004, Koch Records licensed the master to Cut from Island Def Jam (who still held the rights to the album) and reissued the album on CD for the first time ever in the United States; previously, the album had been only available to Stateside fans on CD as an English import, since the album's original American release (on the Island subsidiary Antilles, during Island's association with Warner Bros. Records) had long since gone out of print.

In 2009, Island Records released a two-disc 30th Anniversary Deluxe Edition consisting of the remastered original album plus bonus tracks and selections from the band's appearances on BBC's John Peel Sessions on the first disc and a second disc entitled "unCut" with demos and alternate mixes.

== Track listing ==
All tracks written by Viv Albertine, Tessa Pollitt, Ariane Forster (aka Ari Up) and Paloma Romero (aka Palmolive).

=== Side one ===
1. "Instant Hit" – 2:43
2. "So Tough" – 2:41
3. "Spend, Spend, Spend" – 3:18
4. "Shoplifting" – 1:39
5. "FM" – 3:35

=== Side two ===
1. "Newtown" – 3:48
2. "Ping Pong Affair" (stylized as "ƃuoԀ ƃuᴉԀ Affair" on the record sleeve) – 4:16
3. "Love und Romance" – 2:27
4. "Typical Girls" – 3:57
5. "Adventures Close to Home" – 3:28

Bonus tracks

1. "I Heard It Through the Grapevine" (Barrett Strong, Norman Whitfield) – 3:59
2. "Liebe and Romanze" (Slow Version) – 4:45

=== 2009 deluxe edition ===
Disc 1

1. "Instant Hit"
2. "So Tough"
3. "Spend, Spend, Spend"
4. "Shoplifting"
5. "FM"
6. "Newtown"
7. "Ping Pong Affair"
8. "Love und Romance"
9. "Typical Girls"
10. "Adventures Close to Home"
11. "I Heard It Through the Grapevine"
12. "Liebe and Romanze" (Slow Version)
13. "Typical Girls" (Brink Style Dub)
14. "Love and Romance" (John Peel Session 19/09/1977)
15. "Vindictive" (John Peel Session 19/09/1977)
16. "Newtown" (John Peel Session 19/09/1977)
17. "Shoplifting" (John Peel Session 19/09/1977)
18. "So Tough" (John Peel Session 17/04/1978)
19. "Instant Hit" (John Peel Session 17/04/1978)
20. "FM" (John Peel Session 17/04/1978)

Disc 2

1. "I Heard It Through the Grapevine" (Demo)
2. "Instant Hit" (8-Track Demo)
3. "Spend, Spend, Spend" (8-Track Demo)
4. "Newtown" (8-Track Demo)
5. "Adventures Close to Home" (8-Track Demo)
6. "Instant Hit" (Rough Mix)
7. "So Tough" (Rough Mix)
8. "Spend, Spend, Spend" (Toast Version)
9. "Shoplifting" (Rough Mix)
10. "FM" (Rough Mix)
11. "Newtown" (Rough Mix)
12. "Ping Pong Affair" (Rough Mix)
13. "Love und Romance" (Rough Mix)
14. "Typical Girls" (Rough Mix)
15. "Adventures Close to Home" (Rough Mix)
16. "So Tough" (Outtake)
17. "Instant Hit" (Instrumental Outtake)
18. "Typical Girls" (Instrumental Outtake)
19. "Spend, Spend, Spend" (Dub Version)
20. "In the Beginning, There Was Rhythm" (Early Version)

== Personnel ==
The Slits

- Ari Up – vocals
- Viv Albertine – guitar
- Tessa Pollitt – bass guitar

with:

- Budgie – drums
- Bruce Smith – uncredited voice on "Love und Romance"
- Dennis Bovell – sound effects
- Max "Maxi" Edwards – drums on "I Heard It Through the Grapevine"
- Neneh Cherry – uncredited backing vocals

Technical

- Mike Dunne – engineer
- Pennie Smith – photography
- Brian Gaylor, Viv Albertine – inner sleeve cartoons
- Rema, Stuart Henderson, the Slits – production on "I Heard It Through the Grapevine"
