= Hollie Cook =

English singer and keyboardist (born 1987)

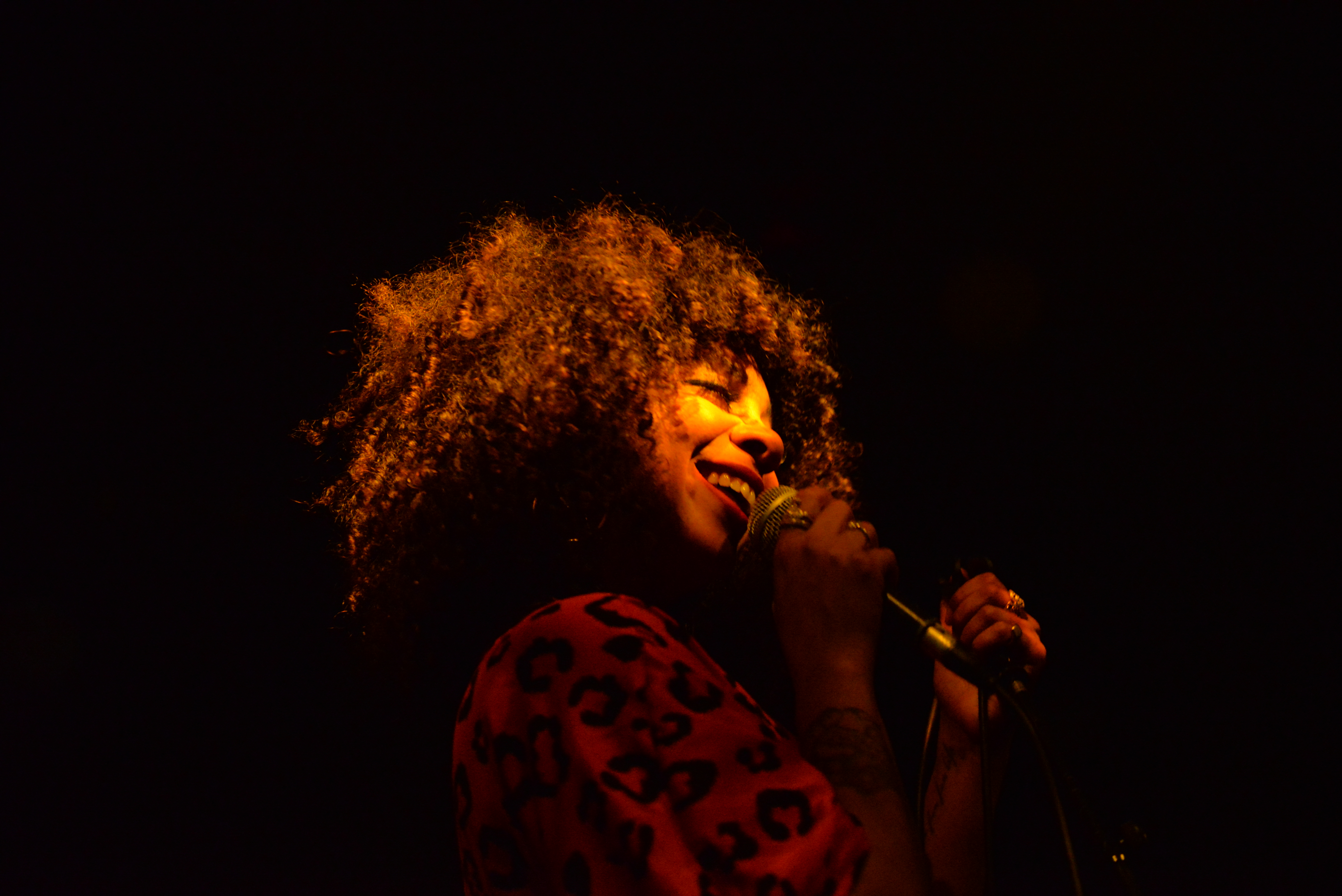
- Hollie Cook in concert in Brussels, 2019.

Background information
- Born: 1987 (age 37–38); West London, England
- Genres: Reggae, roots reggae, dub, reggae pop, post-punk
- Instrument(s): Vocals, keyboards
- Years active: 2006–present
- Labels: Mr Bongo, Merge Records
- Formerly of: The Slits
- Website: holliecook.com

Hollie Cook (born 1987, West London, England) is an English singer and keyboardist. She was part of the final line-up of all-female punk/reggae band the Slits. From 2010, Cook has also had a career as solo artist working with producer and songwriter Prince Fatty. In 2011, she released her first and self-titled reggae album Hollie Cook. She calls her own music "tropical pop", and has a passion for reggae and female rocksteady and reggae singers, such as Janet Kay and Phyllis Dillon, combined with classic 1960s girl groups.

== Biography ==
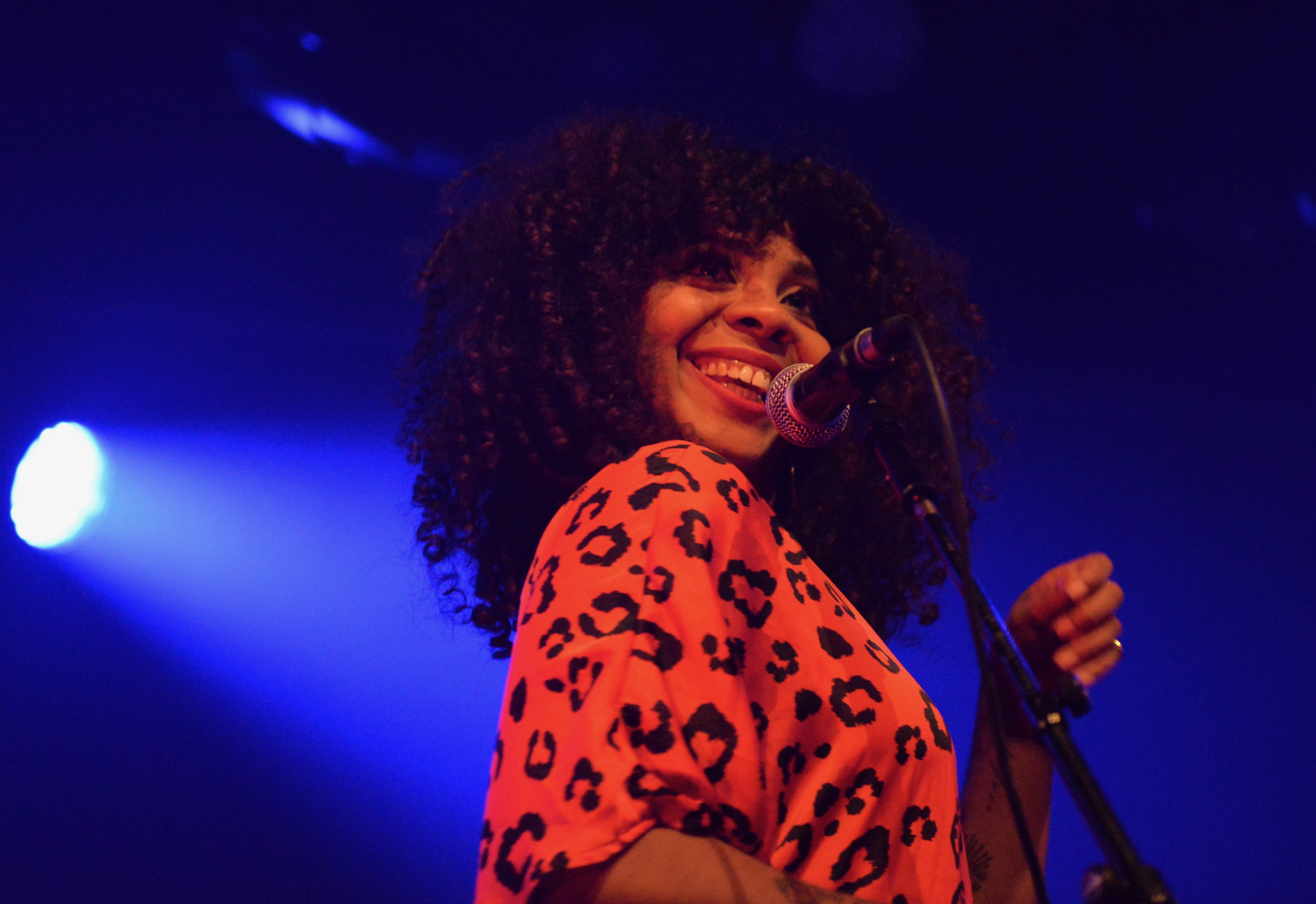
Hollie Cook in concert in Brussels, 2019

Hollie Cook is the daughter of Sex Pistols drummer Paul Cook. Her mother Jeni was a backing singer for Culture Club, and Boy George is her godfather. She is of paternal English and maternal West Indian descent.

Hollie Cook joined the re-formed Slits and performed on the band's 2006 EP Revenge of the Killer Slits. She went on to collaborate with Ian Brown and Jamie T, and recorded her self-titled debut album in 2011 with Mike "Prince Fatty" Pelanconi, featuring George Dekker of the Pioneers and Dennis Bovell. The BBC, reviewing the album, described it as "one of the most enjoyable reggae albums of 2011 so far." She went on to record a radio session for the BBC and appear on Later... with Jools Holland. De Telegraaf gave the album a four star review.

In 2012, she was chosen as one of the support acts for the Stone Roses' reunion shows.

A dub remix version of her debut album was released in May 2012.

She also featured on the 2012 Q covers album of Amy Winehouse's Back to Black, Back to Back to Black, covering "You Know I'm No Good".

Her second album, Twice was funded via PledgeMusic and was released in May 2014. A third album, Vessel of Love, was released in January 2018 and features Alex Paterson, Martin "Youth" Glover, Gaudi and Jah Wobble.

Cook describes her music as "tropical pop".

== Discography ==
=== Albums ===
- Hollie Cook (2011)
- Twice (2014)
- Vessel of Love (2018)
- Happy Hour (2022)
- Shy Girl (2025)

=== Dub albums ===
- Prince Fatty Presents Hollie Cook in Dub (2012), Mr. Bongo (dub-version of Hollie Cook)
- Happy Hour in Dub (2023)

=== Singles ===
- "Body Beat"
- "Walking in the Sand"
- "That Very Night"
- "For Me You Are" – Prince Fatty & Hollie Cook
- "Tiger Balm"
- "Survive"
- "Sweet like Chocolate"
- "Night Night" (2025)
