= Vivien Goldman =

British journalist, writer and musician (born 1952)

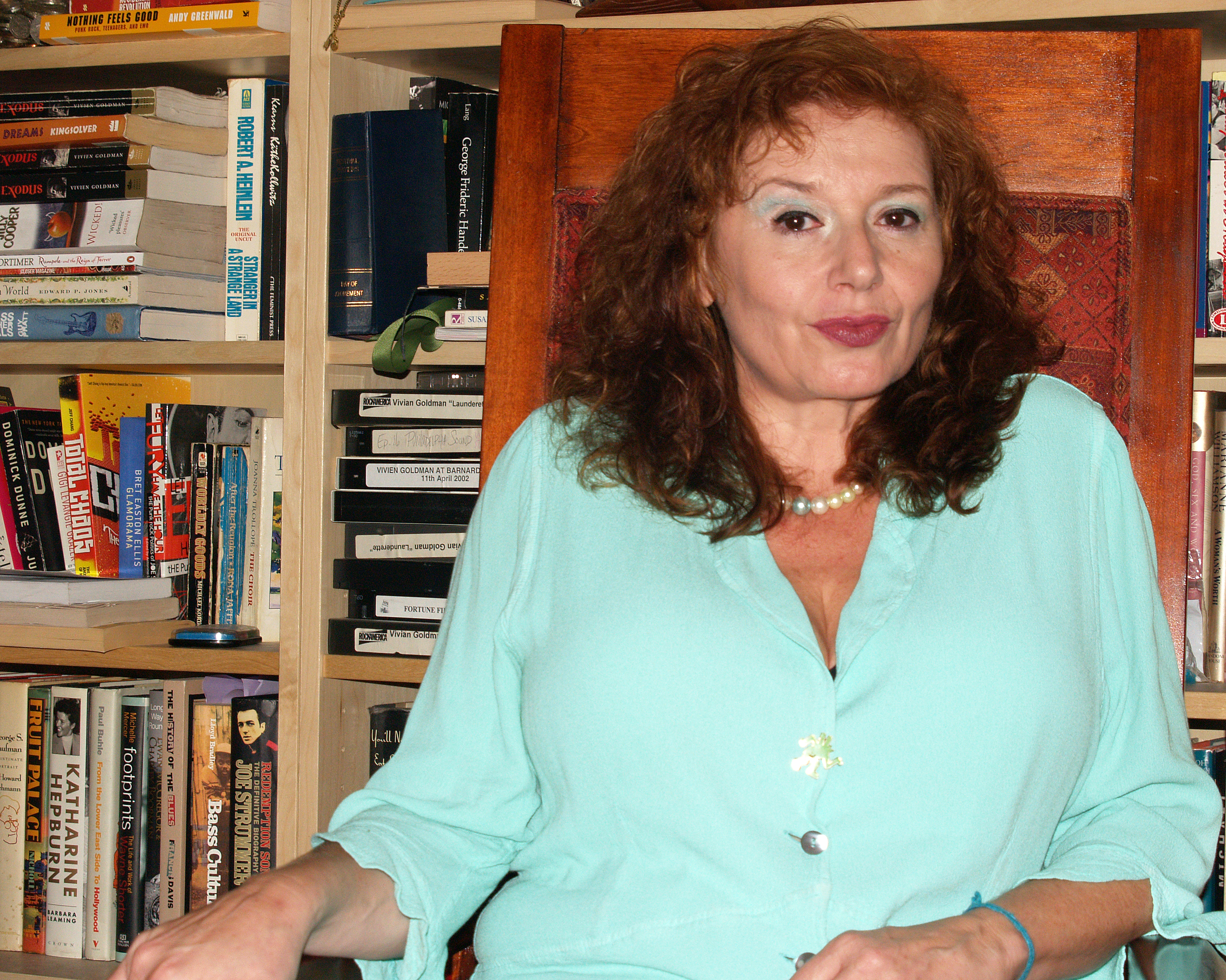
- Goldman in 2007

Background information
- Born: 1952 (age 73–74); London, England
- Education: University of Warwick
- Genres: Pop, punk rock, Reggae, new wave, rock, experimental rock
- Occupations: Musician, singer
- Website: viviengoldman.com

Vivien Goldman (born 1952) is a British journalist, writer and musician.

== Early life and education ==
Goldman was born in London in 1952, the child of two German-Jewish refugees from Nazi Germany. She studied English and American literature at the University of Warwick.

== Career ==
Goldman began her career as a journalist for Cassettes and Cartridges. She then became a PR officer for Atlantic Records and then Island Records, where she worked with Bob Marley. She was a writer and editor for London-based Sounds magazine in the late 1970s.

In the early 1980s, she began making documentaries for Channel Four television, developing and producing the world-music show Big World Cafe. In 1988, she also co-presented The Late Shift, a weekly late night strand of music concerts and films, alongside Charlie Gillett.

=== Musical career ===
Goldman lived in Paris for a year and a half, where she was a member of new wave duo Chantage, which gained modest fame in France. She released the Dirty Washing EP in 1981, with tracks produced by John Lydon and Adrian Sherwood. The EP appeared first on Ed Bahlman's iconic 99 Records imprint on 3 June 1981.

In August 1981, two of the tracks from the EP, "Launderette" and "Private Armies," were issued as a 7" single in the UK. Later the song "Launderette" was included on Gomma Records' "Anti NY" compilation and the Chicks On Speed-produced Girl Monster collection. In that year she also contributed vocals (on the track "Private Armies," which is actually "Private Armies Dub", or "P.A. Dub", from the EP) to the New Age Steppers' self-titled debut.

Goldman wrote for the music magazines NME, Sounds and Melody Maker about reggae, punk and post-punk. She was a member of The Flying Lizards, shared a flat with fellow NME journalist and The Pretenders singer Chrissie Hynde.

Goldman is listed in the writing credits along with the band Massive Attack on the song "Sly". Goldman was Bob Marley's first UK publicist, and Kid Creole's biographer. She also appeared in the song "Vetar i zastave"(Wind and flags), with the Yugoslavian band "Idoli"(Idols) in 1983.

=== Academic career ===
Goldman is also a documentarian and adjunct professor of punk and reggae at New York University's (NYU) Clive Davis Institute of Recorded Music. She is also an adjunct professor of musical cultures and industry at Rutgers University's School of Communication and Information (Rutgers University).

In January 2007, BBC America began a regular Ask the Punk Professor feature on their website, with Goldman answering questions and commenting on current events. The feature ran through 2008.

Goldman appears as an interviewee in the documentary about British reggae group Steel Pulse.

== Books ==
- Rebel Musix, Scribe on a Vibe: Frontline Adventures Linking Punk, Reggae, Afrobeat and Jazz (2024)
- Revenge of the She-Punks (2019)
- The Book of Exodus: The Making and Meaning of Bob Marley and the Wailers' Album of the Century (2006)
- The Black Chord: Visions of the Groove: Connections between Afro-Beats, Rhythm and Blues, Hip Hop, and More (with David Corio) (1999)
- Pearl's Delicious Jamaican Dishes: Recipes from Pearl Bell's Repertoire (1992)
- Kid Creole and the Coconuts: Indiscreet (1984)
- Bob Marley, Soul Rebel – Natural Mystic (1981)
