= Mr Bongo Records =

Mr Bongo
- Parent company: Independent
- Founded: 1989
- Founder: David 'Mr Bongo' Buttle
- Country of origin: United Kingdom
- Official website: www.mrbongo.com

Mr Bongo is a British, Brighton based independent record label, independent film and publishing company specialising in world music and art house/world cinema.

== History ==
Founded in 1989, in Berwick Street, London, the label later moved to Lexington Street and then finally to Poland Street, where they additionally operated a hip-hop record shop, specialising in underground and independent hip-hop. The Mr Bongo record label still exists over 25 years after the first shop opened, and a film label, Mr Bongo Films, was set up in 2004 to release lost classics from around the world.

"Disorient Records' was a sub-label that specialised in dance music from Japan. "Mr Bongo Bass" is a recent sub label of Mr Bongo specialising in global bass music.

The label reissues many albums, including the Incredible Bongo Band's Bongo Rock and the original soundtrack of the iconic Wild Style. They have also signed contemporary bands such as Kit Sebastian, СОЮЗ, and Bala Desejo.

== Mr Bongo Films ==
Mr Bongo Films is the world cinema offshoot imprint of the label that was established in 1989.

Taking in directors such as Glauber Rocha, John Huston, Michelangelo Antonioni, Mikhail Kalatozov, Satyajit Ray, Tomás Gutiérrez Alea, Wojciech Has, Orson Welles, and films such as The Saragossa Manuscript; some other releases by Mr Bongo included Mikhail Kalatozov's Soy Cuba, Glauber Rocha's Black God, White Devil and, by Antonioni, L'Avventura.

== Discography ==
- Category:Mr Bongo Records artists
