= The Slits =

British punk rock band

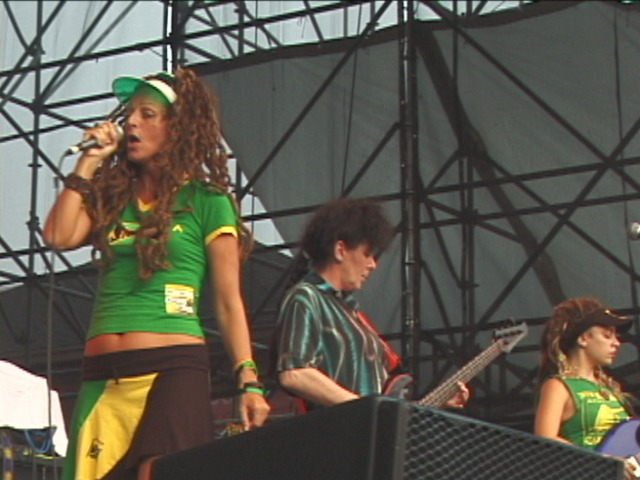
- A reformed lineup of the Slits performing in 2007

Background information
- Origin: London, England
- Genres: Post-punk; punk rock; dub; experimental rock
- Years active: 1976–1982; 2005–2010
- Labels: Island; Y; CBS; Narnack
- Past members: Ari Up; Palmolive; Suzy Gutsy; Kate Korus; Tessa Pollitt; Viv Albertine; Budgie; Bruce Smith; Hollie Cook; Michelle Hill; NO; Anna Schulte; Adele Wilson; Neneh Cherry; Little Anna

The Slits were an early punk and then post-punk band based in London, formed there in 1976 by members of the groups the Flowers of Romance and the Castrators. The group's early line-up consisted of Ari Up (Ariane Forster) and Palmolive (a.k.a. Paloma Romero, who played briefly with Spizzenergi and later left to join the Raincoats), with Viv Albertine and Tessa Pollitt replacing founding members Kate Korus and Suzy Gutsy. Their 1979 debut album, Cut, has been called one of the defining releases of the post-punk era.

== Career ==
=== 1976–1982 ===
The Slits formed in October 1976 when Ari Up went to a Patti Smith gig at the Hammersmith Odeon in London. After having an argument with her mother, Ari was approached by Palmolive and Kate Korus with the offer to form a band. The next day they had their first rehearsal.

The group supported the Clash on their 1977 White Riot tour along with Buzzcocks, the Jam, the Prefects and Subway Sect. Club performances of the Slits during this period are included in The Punk Rock Movie (1978). In November 1978, the Slits toured with the Clash again on the "Sort it Out Tour" and were joined by the Innocents who opened the shows. Joe Strummer said the group would be "great" with intense gigging.

Palmolive left the band in 1978 and debuted with the Raincoats on 4 January 1979. She was replaced by the drummer Budgie (Peter Clarke), formerly of the Spitfire Boys and later of Siouxsie and the Banshees. With the change of drummer came a change of musical style. The Slits' originally raw, raucous and drum-dominated live sound, as captured on two Peel Sessions in 1977 and 1978, was cleaned up and polished to a more bass-orientated sound with the Budgie line-up, and their new style drew heavily from reggae, dub and world music.

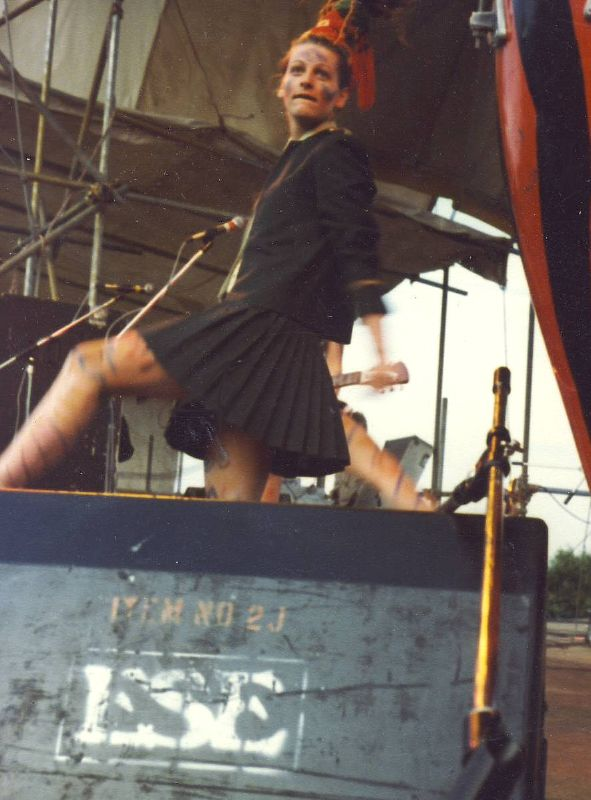
Ari Up playing with the Slits at the Beat the Blues Festival, Alexandra Palace, 15 June 1980

Their Dennis Bovell-produced debut album Cut was released in September 1979 on Island Records, with Neneh Cherry joining as additional backing vocalist. The album's sleeve art depicted the band naked, except for mud and loincloths. It is often claimed that Palmolive left partly because she did not like the album artwork, including by Palmolive herself, but Viv Albertine has stated that Palmolive had been asked to leave the band several months previously, and she does not appear on the record.

The Slits' sound and attitude became increasingly experimental and avant-garde during the early 1980s, when they formed an alliance with Bristol post-punk band the Pop Group, sharing drummer Bruce Smith and releasing a joint single, "In the Beginning There Was Rhythm / Where There's a Will..." (Y Records). This was followed by an untitled compilation album of mostly homemade demos and live performances from before the release of Cut. The band toured widely and released their second studio album, Return of the Giant Slits, before breaking up in early 1982. Ari Up went on to be part of the New Age Steppers.

=== 2005–2010 ===
Ari Up and Tessa Pollitt reformed the band with new members in 2005, as Viv Albertine was unwilling to rejoin, and in 2006 released the EP Revenge of the Killer Slits. The EP featured former Sex Pistols member Paul Cook and former Adam and the Ants members Chris Constantinou and Marco Pirroni as both musicians and co-producers. Cook's daughter Hollie played with the band, singing and playing keyboards. Other members of the reformed band were No (of the Home Office) on guitar, German drummer Anna Schulte, and Adele Wilson on guitar.

The band toured the United States for the first time in twenty-five years during 2006's 'States of Mind' tour, and followed this with tours of Australia and Japan, as well as opening for Sonic Youth at New York's McCarren Park Pool. Adele Wilson and No left the band, to be replaced by American guitarist Michelle Hill. A biography – Typical Girls? The Story of the Slits by Zoë Street Howe was published in the UK by Omnibus Press in July 2009, and the band's third full-length album entitled Trapped Animal was released three months later.

Founding member Ari Up died in Los Angeles in October 2010 at the age of 48. The band's final work, the video for the song "Lazy Slam" from Trapped Animal, was released posthumously according to Ari Up's wishes. A final song, the unreleased 1981 recording "Coulda Woulda Shoulda", was due to be released in early 2011.

== Personnel ==
=== Members ===
- Ari Up – vocals (1976–1982, 2005–2010; her death)
- Palmolive – drums (1976–1978)
- Suzy Gutsy – bass guitar (1976)
- Kate Korus – guitar (1976–1977)
- Tessa Pollitt – bass guitar (1976–1982, 2005–2010)
- Viv Albertine – guitar (1977–1982)
- Budgie – drums (1978–1980)
- Bruce Smith – drums (1980–1982)
- Neneh Cherry – backing vocals (1981)
- Hollie Cook – backing vocals (2005–2010)
- Michelle Hill – guitar (2005–2010)
- NO – guitar, backing vocals (2005–2010)
- Anna Schulte – drums (2005–2010)
- Adele Wilson – guitar (2005–2010)
- Little Anna – keyboards, melodica (2007–2009)

=== Lineups ===
1976	1976–1978	1978–1980	1980–1982
Ari Up – vocals; Kate Korus – guitar; Suzy Gutsy – bass guitar; Palmolive – drums	Ari Up – vocals; Viv Albertine – guitar; Tessa Pollitt – bass guitar; Palmolive – drums	Ari Up – vocals; Viv Albertine – guitar; Tessa Pollitt – bass guitar; Budgie – drums	Ari Up – vocals; Viv Albertine – guitar; Tessa Pollitt – bass guitar; Bruce Smith – drums
1982–2005	2005–2010
Disbanded	Ari Up – vocals; Hollie Cook – backing vocals; No – guitar, backing vocals; Adele Wilson – guitar; Michelle Hill – guitar; Tessa Pollitt – bass guitar; Anna Schulte – drums; Anna Ozawa – melodica, keyboard

== Discography ==
=== Studio albums ===
- Cut (Island (UK) / Antilles (US), September 1979) – UK No. 30
- Return of the Giant Slits (CBS, October 1981)
- Trapped Animal (Narnack, 2009)

=== Compilation albums ===
- The Slits/Bootleg Retrospective/Untitled (Y Records, May 1980)
- Double Peel Sessions (Strange Fruit, November 1988)
- In the Beginning (Jungle, 1997)
- Live at the Gibus Club (Castle Music / Sanctuary, February 2005 – recorded January 1978)

=== Singles and EPs ===
- "Typical Girls" / "I Heard It Through the Grapevine" (Island (UK) / Antilles (US), September 1979, also issued as a 12-inch EP with additional alternate versions) UK No. 60
- "In the Beginning There Was Rhythm" (Y, March 1980, split single with the Pop Group)
- "Man Next Door" / "Man Next Door (version)" (Y, June 1980)
- "Animal Space" / "Animal Spacier" (Human (UK), 1981, also issued as a 12-inch EP on Human (USA) with different tracks)
- "Earthbeat" / "Earthdub" / "Begin Again, Rhythm" (CBS, August 1981 (UK), December 1981 (US), 7 inch single with the first 2 tracks, and 12 inch EP with 3 tracks)
- "American Radio Interview (Winter 1980)" / "Face Dub" (CBS, October 1981, bonus record included with Return of the Giant Slits album, side one plays at 33 rpm)
- The Peel Sessions (Strange Fruit, February 1987)
- Revenge of the Killer Slits (2006) 7"/CD Maxi single (Only Lovers Left Alive/EXO)

== Documentary ==
In 2018, a documentary film about the band, Here To Be Heard: The Story of the Slits, was released.

== In popular culture ==
The band’s name appears in the lyrics of the Le Tigre song "Hot Topic".
