= Tessa Pollitt =

British musician

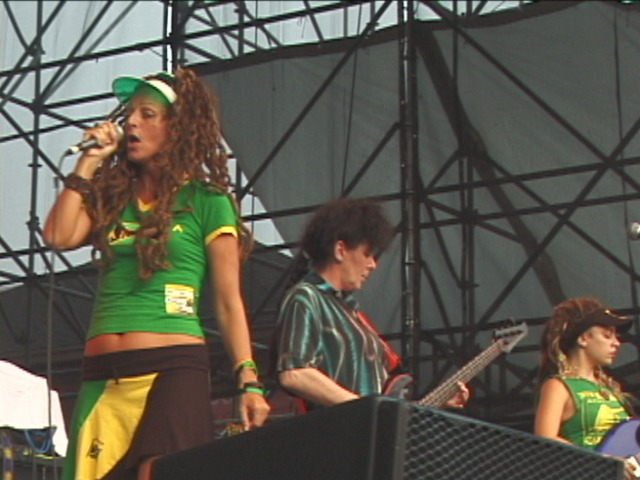
- Ari Up, Pollitt, and Adele Wilson of the Slits, performing in 2007
- Born: Teresa Mary Clare Pollitt; 7 May 1959 (age 67); London, England
- Occupations: Musician, artist
- Years active: 1976–81, 2006–2010
- Musical career
- Genres: Punk, reggae
- Instruments: Bass, guitar, vocals
- Label: Island

Teresa Mary Clare Pollitt (born 7 May 1959) is an English musician who is best known as the bass guitarist for the punk rock band the Slits between 1976 and 1982.

== Music career ==
At 16 years old, Pollitt replaced the Slits's original bassist, Suzi Gutsy. The Slits disbanded in 1982 after the release of their second album, Return of the Giant Slits.

In the mid-2000s, Pollitt and Slits singer Ari Up reformed the band with new members, including singer Hollie Cook, guitarist Dr. No and drummer Anna Schulte. In 2006, the record label S.A.F. Records released an EP titled Revenge of the Killer Slits. The EP line-up included Paul Cook, formerly of the Sex Pistols, and Marco Pirroni, formerly of Adam and the Ants. In 2009, the Slits released the album ,Trapped Animal.

== Personal life ==
Pollitt married Sean Oliver and has a daughter with him. Oliver died in 1990 from sickle cell anemia. During the 1980s, Pollitt lived in Africa, on hiatus from the music industry.
