= Viv Albertine =

Australian-born British musician and writer

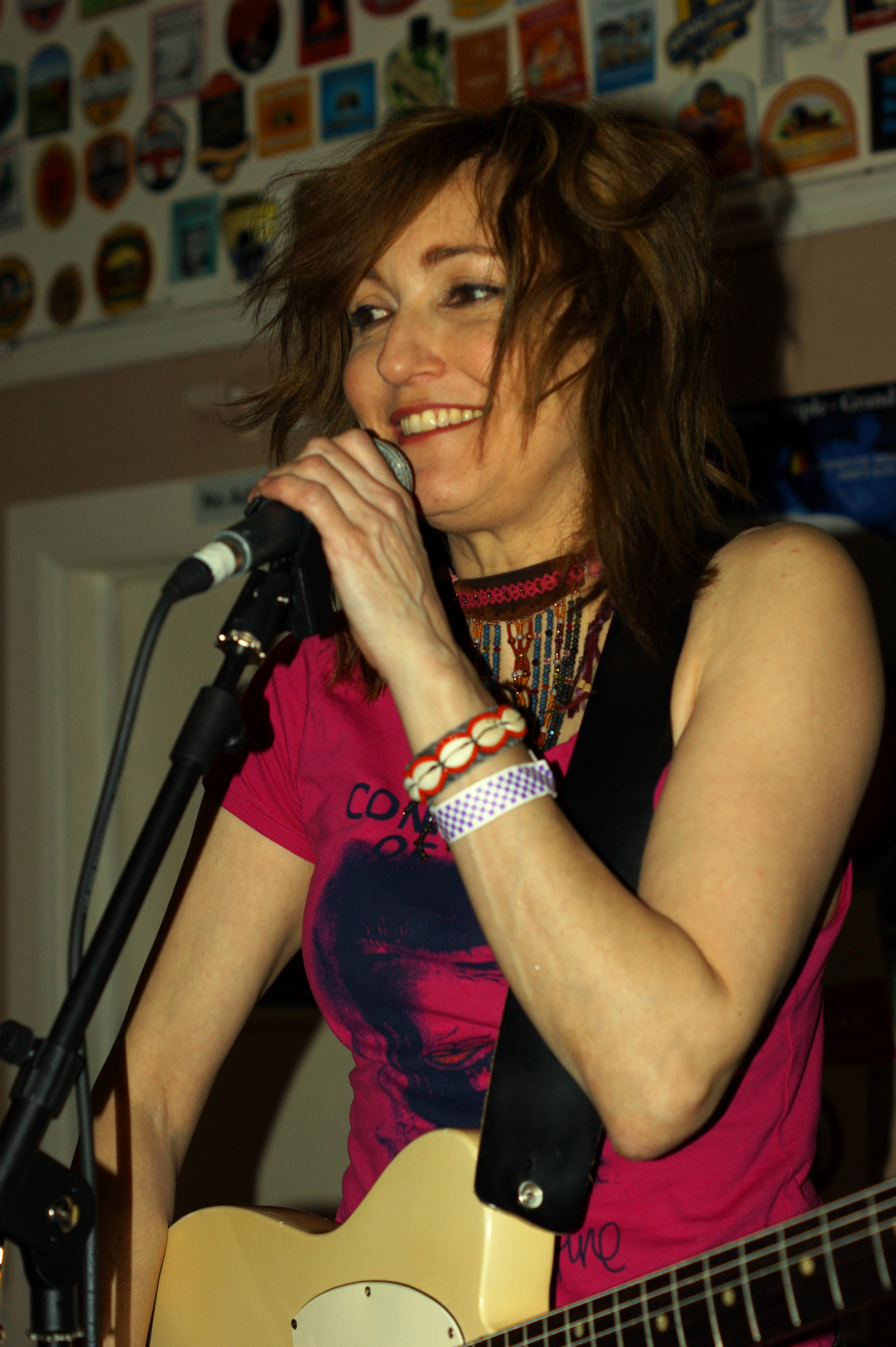
- Albertine performing in 2011

Background information
- Born: Viviane Katrina Louise Albertine; 1 December 1954 (age 71); Sydney, Australia
- Origin: London, England
- Genres: Punk rock; post-punk; dub; new wave
- Occupations: Musician; television director; author
- Instruments: Guitar; vocals
- Years active: 1976–2014
- Formerly of: The Slits; the Flowers of Romance; New Age Steppers; 49 Americans; Flying Lizards
- Website: vivalbertine.com

Viviane Katrina Louise Albertine (born 1 December 1954) is an Australian-born English musician, singer, songwriter and writer. She is best known as the guitarist for the punk band the Slits from 1977 until 1982, with whom she recorded two studio albums. Prior to joining the Slits, Albertine was a member of the Flowers of Romance.

Following the Slits' break-up in 1982, Albertine studied filmmaking and subsequently worked as a freelance director for the BBC and British Film Institute. After a lengthy break from performing and recording music, Albertine released her sole solo studio album, The Vermilion Border, in 2012.

Albertine's first autobiography, Clothes, Clothes, Clothes. Music, Music, Music. Boys, Boys, Boys, was released in 2014 to widespread critical acclaim. A follow-up focusing on her family, To Throw Away Unopened, was released in 2018.

== Early life ==
Albertine was born in Sydney to an English mother of partial Swiss ancestry and a Corsican father. She was brought up in north London, attended comprehensive school in Muswell Hill, and at the age of 17 enrolled in Hornsey School of Art. After completing a foundation course at Hornsey, she went to Chelsea School of Art to study fashion and textile design. In 1976, while still studying at Chelsea, she helped form the early punk band the Flowers of Romance. In 1976, her Swiss maternal grandmother bequeathed her some money with which she purchased an electric guitar.

== Music career ==
Albertine was a key figure in the 1970s punk scene, and was the on/off girlfriend of Mick Jones of the Clash. In 1976, she formed the Flowers of Romance with Sid Vicious. She joined the Slits as the band's guitarist after founding member Kate Korus left. She was hesitant to join an all female band, but she changed her mind after her friend Chrissie Hynde told her to 'shut up and get on with it'.

The Clash's 1979 song "Train in Vain" has been interpreted by some as a response to "Typical Girls" by the Slits, which mentions girls standing by their men. Albertine split up with songwriter Mick Jones shortly before he wrote the song.

While continuing as a key member of the Slits, Albertine contributed guitar and vocal work to the 49 Americans' 1980 album E Pluribus Unum.

She became part of Adrian Sherwood's dub-influenced collective New Age Steppers, and played on their self-titled 1981 debut album. She appeared as a guest guitarist on the Flying Lizards' debut album, as well as Singers & Players' 1982 album, Revenge of the Underdog.

In 2009, Albertine began performing as a solo artist. Her debut gig was at the Windmill in Brixton on 20 September 2009. She went on to tour the US, opening for the Raincoats. In March 2010, she released a four-song debut solo EP entitled, Flesh, on Thurston Moore's Ecstatic Peace! label.

Albertine recorded a cover version of David Bowie's "Letter to Hermione" for the Bowie tribute album, We Were So Turned On: A Tribute to David Bowie, which was released on 6 September 2010. Her debut solo album, The Vermilion Border, was released on 5 November 2012 through the Cadiz Music label. The album was a featured project on Pledgemusic. On 17 June 2013, she opened for Siouxsie Sioux at the Royal Festival Hall in London.

Following the death of her mother in 2014, Albertine stepped away from music: "I'm just not interested in playing any more. I came to that decision the night my mum died. I don't worship musicians. I don't worship rock'n'roll. I don't miss it. I see music as a vehicle like writing or film-making, but I don't think it's a very relevant medium for me at the moment."

== Film and television career ==
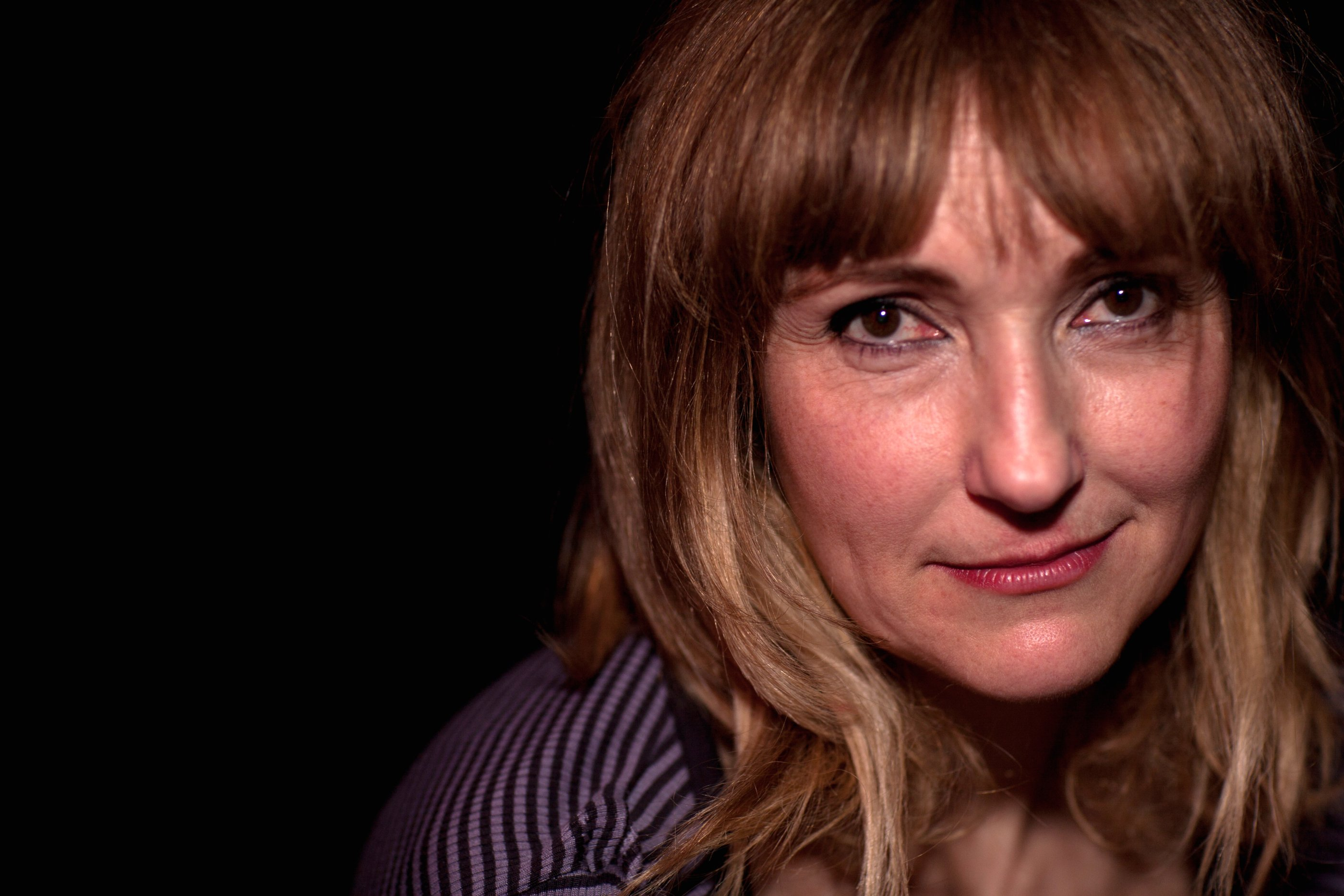
Albertine in 2010

After the Slits disbanded in 1982, Albertine studied filmmaking in London. She worked as a director, mostly for television and making promos and videos for bands, many of which were used on UK MTV throughout most of the 1980s and 1990s, for example, "Ghosts of American Astronauts" by the Mekons, or another example : she directed a promotional video of "Uptight" by King Blank of Ian Lowery. Her freelance directing work included stints with the BBC and the British Film Institute.

In 1991, Albertine wrote and directed the short film Coping with Cupid, a film about three aliens as blondes that come to earth to research romantic love. In 2010, she worked with Joanna Hogg on the soundtrack to Hogg's 2010 film Archipelago.

In 2013, Albertine starred in Hogg's 2013 film Exhibition, alongside Tom Hiddleston and Liam Gillick. The film premiered at the Locarno Film Festival in August 2013, and was released on DVD in 2014.

== Writing ==
Albertine's memoir, Clothes, Clothes, Clothes. Music, Music, Music. Boys, Boys, Boys, was published in 2014 in the UK by Faber and Faber and in the US by Thomas Dunne Books. It was a Sunday Times, Mojo, Rough Trade and NME Book of the Year in 2014, as well as being shortlisted for the National Book Awards. In 2019, The New York Times named the memoir in its The 50 Best Memoirs of the Past 50 Years article.

Her second memoir To Throw Away Unopened was published by Faber and Faber in May 2018. The book describes the complex relationship between Albertine and her mother. The title is taken from a note written on a bag left behind by her mother after her death. Albertine admits she viewed this as "a provocation", and felt that her mother expected her to look inside: The contents turned out to be personal diaries, which Albertine read in full, and ultimately incorporated into her own memoir.

== Personal life ==
Albertine married in 1995 and gave birth to a daughter, Vida, in 1999. After seventeen years of marriage, she divorced. Albertine currently lives in Hackney, London.

Albertine is on the autism spectrum.

== Discography ==
As a solo artist

- The Vermilion Border (2012) (Cadiz Music)
- Flesh 12" 92024) (Cadiz Music)

with The Slits

- Cut (1979)
- Bootleg Retrospective (1980)
- Return of the Giant Slits (1981)

== Bibliography ==
- Clothes, Clothes, Clothes. Music, Music, Music. Boys, Boys, Boys (2014) ISBN 978-1250065995
- To Throw Away Unopened (2018) ISBN 978-0571326211
