= Europeans (band) =

English new wave band

- Cover of Europeans single on Heartbeat

Background information
- Origin: Bristol, England
- Genres: Post-punk, new wave
- Years active: 1977–1979
- Labels: Heartbeat; Rialto Records; Cherry Red; Bristol Archive
- Past members: Jonathan Cole; Jon Klein; Steve Street; James Cole
- Website: Europeans info at Bristol Archive Records

Europeans were a new wave band formed in Bristol, England in 1977. The line-up was Jonathan Cole (formally of Colortapes, on vocals, guitar and synthesizers), Jon Klein (ex-Emergency Exit on lead guitar), Steve Street (ex-Public Enemy Number One on bass guitar) and James Cole (drums and percussion). According to Klein, ‘we were going to be called 'The Noses.'

Their single "Europeans" / "Voices" was engineered by David Lord at his Crescent Studios in Bath and was the second release of Bristols' Heartbeat Records. This single was heard by Cherry Red Records and led to a licensing agreement between them and Heartbeat. The band later contributed the track "On the Continent" to the label's Avon Calling compilation album. The band split in 1979 when Rialto Records signed Jonathan Cole as a solo artist. Jon Klein went to London with Kevin Mills from The X-Certs to form Specimen (and was involved with the Batcave); he later joined Siouxsie and the Banshees and played on three of their albums. Steve Street joined Apartment, then Interview; he then moved on to recording bands as an engineer-producer, and later worked with Tears for Fears.

The band had originally recorded an album's worth of material, but this was not released until 2008, when Bristol Archive Records brought out a downloadable album called Take Me To The Continent. This was followed in 2009 with a recorded live set, Live 1978 – Bower Ashton College, and a collection of demos, GBH Demos 1978.

== Post break-up ==
- Jonathan Cole – Signed to Rialto Records, his single "Keys to my Car" was never released.
- Jon Klein – formed Specimen, and later went on to record with Siouxsie & the Banshees.
- Steve Street – joined Apartment as bass guitarist, then Interview. He had originally recorded demos for The Pop Group and in 1978/79 the Glaxo Babies. He subsequently went on to engineer and produce a number of other Bristol-based bands including those on the Bristol Beat tape, Essential Bop, Electric Guitars, The X-Certs, Vice Squad and The Blue Aeroplanes. He was also involved in working with other bands like Tears for Fears. He currently works for Sugar Shack Records and its re-release subsidiary Bristol Archive Records.

== Discography ==
=== Albums ===
- Take Me to the Continent (2008, Bristol Archive, UK, Download, ARC002)
- Live 1978 – Bower Ashton College (2009, Bristol Archive, UK, Download, ARC095)
- GBH Demos 1978 (2009, Bristol Archive, UK, Download, ARC098)

=== Singles ===
- "Europeans"/"Voices" (1978, Heartbeat, UK, 7", PULSE 2)
- "Europeans"/"It Wasn't Me" (1979, Rialto, UK, 7", TREB-105)

=== Compilation appearances ===
- Labels Unlimited - The Second Record Collection (1979, Cherry Red, UK, LP, ARED 4)
- Avon Calling (1980, Heartbeat, UK, LP, HB 1)
- Avon Calling [Reissue + Unreleased Tracks and Heartbeat Singles Collection] (2005, Cherry Red, UK, CD, CDMRED292)
- I'll Give You My Heart I'll Give You My Heart - The Cherry Red Records Singles Collection 1978-1983 (2008, Cherry Red, UK, 8xCD, CRCD BOX 4)

== See also ==
- List of bands from Bristol
- Culture of Bristol
- Heartbeat Records
- Crescent Studios
- Avon Calling
- List of record labels from Bristol
