= List of bands from Bristol =

This is a list of notable music groups, musicians and singers from, and associated with, the English city of Bristol and its surrounding areas (including North Somerset, Bath & North East Somerset, Western Wiltshire, and South Gloucestershire).

== A ==
- Airbus: Rock band (1987–2002), formed by Nick Davidge, James Childs, Chris Fielden and Simon Hedges. They released three LPs, but their most notable recording was "Airbus Reconstructed" on the B-side of Portishead's "Sour Times" single.
- Rodney Allen: Guitarist and songwriter. Released the Happysad LP on The Subway Organization in 1987, and after a brief spell in The Chesterfields joined The Blue Aeroplanes.
- Lauren Aquilina: Singer / songwriter and pianist born in Bristol who had three self-funded hit singles between 2012 and 2014. Now signed to Island Records, she released her debut album Isn't It Strange in 2016. As well as composing her own material she has also co-written more than 30 songs for other artists including Gabrielle Aplin, Tom Grennan, Rina Sawayama, Louise and Netsky.
- Art Objects: New Wave "Art band" (1978–1981). Fronted by Bristol Beat Poet Gerard Langley, brother John Langley on drums, dancer Wojtek Dmochowski (all later of The Blue Aeroplanes), plus bassist Bill Stair and guitarists/brothers Jonjo and Robin Key. They released two singles, and the album 'Bagpipe Music' on local label Heartbeat Records.
- Aspects: Hip Hop group (1996–present). The outfit's core members are emcees El Eye and Mantis, producer Specify and beatbox Monkey Moo.

== B ==
- Bananarama, 1980s all-female group.
- Geoff Barrow: Producer, songwriter and instrumentalist (born 1971). Founder member of Portishead. In 1991, he assisted on the recording of Massive Attack's breakthrough album Blue Lines.
- Acker Bilk: Clarinetist and songwriter (1929–2014). Best known for his 1961 UK hit single "Stranger on the Shore", which also became the first British recording to reach No. 1 on the US Billboard Hot 100 in 1962.
- Black Roots: A roots reggae band from the St. Paul's area of Bristol, formed in 1979. Their first (self-titled) album was released on their own Nubian label, and the band was commissioned by the BBC to write and record the theme song to the sitcom The Front Line. They released several other albums before they stopped touring in 1990 and officially disbanded in 1995.
- The Blue Aeroplanes: Art rock guitar band (1983–present). The band became the official owners of The Fleece live music venue in May 2010 after bassist Chris Sharp purchased the lease.
- Beki Bondage: Rebecca Louise Bond, singer and musician (born 1963). Came to prominence as a member of Bristol Punk Band Vice Squad.
- Breakbeat Era: Short-lived British project, that combined the breakbeat talent of drum and bass producers, Roni Size and DJ Die, with the vocals of singer Leonie Laws.
- The Brilliant Corners: Indie band that encompassed a variety of musical styles over its lifetime (1983–1993). They released a series of albums and singles, including one for the charity Mencap, called Brian Rix. Subsequently, Davey Woodward and Chris Galvin formed the Experimental Pop Band in 1995.
- Bronnt Industries Kapital: Musical project based around producer and multi-instrumentalist Guy Bartell. They have released three studio albums, 'Virtute et Industria', 'Häxan' and 'Hard for Justice'.
- Angelo Bruschini: Rock guitarist who has been a member of The Numbers, The Rimshots, The Blue Aeroplanes, and now Massive Attack. He produced Strangelove's eponymous album in 1997. He also played guitar on Jane Taylors' award-winning single "Blowing This Candle Out" in 2003.
- Danny Byrd: Drum and Bass DJ, producer and musician from Bath. His first record release was in 1998, a 12" single entitled 'Manhattan'.
- Pete Byrne: Songwriter and singer (born 1954, Bath, Somerset). Originally part of the short-lived group Neon with Rob Fisher. Both went on to form the pop duo Naked Eyes, and had a hit record with their cover version of "Always Something There to Remind Me".

== C ==
- Carlton: Soul and dance singer.
- Cauda Pavonis: Death rock, dark wave, gothic rock band, formed around the core duo of husband and wife team Su and David Wainwright. 1989–present. Have issued six full-length albums and numerous EPs and singles.
- Chaos UK: Hardcore punk band (1979–present). Originally signed to Riot City Records, they have toured the world and released numerous albums and singles.
- Chaotic Dischord: Punk band (1981–1988). Initially formed as a joke, by members of Vice Squad and their road crew, to prove a point to Simon Edwards of Riot City Records. They subsequently went on to be one of the label's best-selling acts.
- The Chesterfields: Indie pop band from Yeovil, Somerset (1984–1989). They garnered Indie Chart Hits for their singles and albums on Bristols' The Subway Organization label, as well as their own Household label.
- Chikinki: Funk band that evolved into electro-pop (1996–present). Originally signed to Bristol label Sink and Stove Records who released their debut album Experiment with Mother; they then joined Island Records but were later dropped.
- Gary Clail: Rap singer and producer. Part of On-U Sound Records and led Gary Clail's Tackhead Sound System. His 1991 single "Human Nature", released as Gary Clail On-U Sound System, reached No. 10 on the UK chart.
- Claytown Troupe: An alternative rock band from Bristol, Bath, and Weston-super-Mare, England. (1984–1993, 2004–present). Formed by lead singer Christian Riou. They have produced albums for Island Records and EMI.
- Climie Fisher: Pop duo (1987–1990), formed by former Naked Eyes keyboardist Rob Fisher and vocalist Simon Climie. They are best known for the 1987/88 hit singles "Love Changes (Everything)" and the hip hop-styled remix of "Rise to the Occasion".
- Russ Conway: Pianist and composer (1925–2000). He had a cumulative total of 83 weeks on the UK Singles Chart in 1959, including two number one records – "Side Saddle" and "Roulette". He appeared as himself in French and Saunders' 1994 Christmas special, playing "Side Saddle" in their spoof of The Piano.
- Roger Cook: singer and songwriter (born 1940, Fishponds, Bristol). Has written many hits, usually with his writing partner Roger Greenaway, for themselves and other recording artists. Was a member of the Kestrels, David and Jonathan and Blue Mink.
- The Cortinas: Originally started as a R&B band, but is more famous for its punk and new wave incarnations (1976–1978). Featured bassist Dexter Dalwood, guitarists Mike Fewings, drummer Daniel Swan (Sneetches) and future Clash member Nick Sheppard. They split up in the same year that they released, on CBS, their only album, True Romances.
- The Cougars: Rock instrumental group (1961–1964). They had a modest UK hit in 1963 with the single "Saturday Nite at the Duck-Pond", which was based on a small section of Tchaikovsky's Swan Lake, and was consequently banned by the BBC.
- Crescent: Alternative band whose music is described as slow, minimalistic and melancholy (early 1990s onwards). Has members in common with Movietone.
- Adge Cutler: Alan John Cutler Scrumpy and Western singer and songwriter (1930–1974). Originator of the description Scrumpy and Western music, and founder of the Wurzels in 1966. Best known for his minor UK hit single in 1967 (and unofficial West Country Anthem), "Drink Up Thy Cider".

== D ==
- Daddy G: Grantley Evan Marshall (Daddy G) DJ and singer (born 1959). Former member of The Wild Bunch and founding member of the band Massive Attack in 1988.
- David and Jonathan: Name used by Bristolian pop duo Roger Greenaway and Roger Cook after The Kestrels. They wrote the songs "This Golden Ring" and "You've Got Your Troubles" for the group The Fortunes. In 1966 they teamed up with George Martin and did a cover of The Beatles' "Michelle", which was a hit single in both the UK and the US.
- Robert Del Naja: Also known as 3D or "D". Artist, vocalist and musician (born 1965). Originally a graffiti artist and a member of The Wild Bunch, Del Naja went on to become a founding member of the band Massive Attack.
- DJ Die: Daniel Kausman, formed a partnership with Jody Wisternoff (who later formed Way Out West with Nick Warren). He was a core member of Reprazent and later in 1998 became one third of Breakbeat Era.
- Disorder: Hardcore Punk band (1980–present). Bass guitarist Phil Lovering (of The X-Certs) joined the ever-changing line up in 1982 and has remained the only constant member since then. Their own label Disorder Records was an offshoot of Heartbeat Records.
- Dragons: Indie rock band (2005–present). Formed by singer Anthony Tombling Jr and drummer David Francolini, the band also includes Adam Coombs (synthesizer), Calvin Talbot (guitar), Will Crewdson (guitar) and Jim Fage (bass). Their debut album 'Here are the Roses' was released in 2007.
- Patrick Duff : lead singer with Strangelove and now solo artist who was born on the top floor of a house in Redland

== E ==
- The Eagles: Instrumental rock band (1958–1964) formed at the Eagles House Club in Bristol. In 1962 Ron Grainer (composer of the Doctor Who theme) had them contribute to the soundtrack of his film 'Some People', about a fictional Bristol band not unlike themselves.
- Earthling trip hop band (1990s). They produced several singles, 12"s and two albums (the first album, 1995's 'Radar' had scratching and guitar by Geoff Barrow of Portishead, and the second 'Humandust' was (released in 2004 after they had split).
- East of Eden, a progressive rock band formed in 1967.
- Elder Island: an indie electronica band formed in the early 2010s under the name Trouvaille. Their self-titled debut was released in 2014 and their first full-length project, The Omnitone Collection, in 2019. As of July 2024, they have released four EPs, two full-length albums, and two remix albums.
- Electric Guitars: Esoteric pop/funk band (1979–1983). After initially recording singles for local labels (Fried Egg Records and Recreational Records) and contributing live tracks to the first edition of The Bristol Recorder, the band was signed to Stiff Records. They released in total five singles and two post break-up albums (one download only).
- Manny Elias: Drummer and songwriter (born 1953 in Calcutta, India). Originally a member of the pop/rock band Interview from Bath, in 1982 he began working with Tears for Fears on the albums The Hurting and Songs From The Big Chair, and has co-writing credits on "The Way You Are" and "The Working Hour". He left Tears for Fears in 1986, and has provided percussion on albums for such artists as Peter Gabriel, Peter Hammill and Julian Lennon.
- Matt Elliott: Guitarist and singer playing dark folk music, also producer and remixer. Until 2001 he produced and recorded under the name The Third Eye Foundation.
- Rob Ellis: Robert Damian Ellis (born 1962) is a rock drummer, producer, and arranger. He is best known for his work with PJ Harvey, with whom he has been most closely associated as producer, arranger and musician since 1990.
- The Escape: Post Punk-Goth band (1981–1984) formed by Alan Griffiths & Emil from Apartment with bassist Stuart Morgan. Released one single on their own Volatile Records label. In 1983 signed to Phonogram Records / Mercury Records and released two singles. A live album 'Live in 1982' (compiled and with liner notes by Dave Massey - see above) has been released on CD and online via bristolarchiverecords.com in the summer / autumn of 2018.
- Europeans: New wave band (1977–1979). Their self-titled single 'Europeans' was the second release on Heartbeat Records. Jon Klein, guitarist, went on to form Specimen and later played with Siouxie & the Banshees.

== F ==
- Rob Fisher: Rob Fisher (1956–1999) was a British keyboardist and songwriter from Cheltenham. His early bands included The Xtians and Whitewing, and in 1979 he joined up with Pete Byrne in Bath to form Neon. He achieved chart success in the UK, Europe and North America as a member of Naked Eyes (again with Pete Byrne), and later Climie Fisher (with Simon Climie).
- The Flatmates: Indie pop band (1985–1989). The band's core members were Martin Whitehead (Guitar) and Debbie Haynes (Vocals). Initially, the band also included Kath Beach (Bass guitar) and Rocker (Drums). They released five singles, all of which featured in the UK Indie Chart Top 20.
- Flying Saucer Attack: Experimental space rock band (1992–2000). David Pearce and Rachel Brook were core members.
- Force Majeure: Electronic dance band (1983–1986). Included ex-members of The Agents (English band) and featured as part of the Farian Corporation on a German top ten charity recording of 'Mother and Child Reunion'.
- The Fred Bloggs Band: Dance and original song band (1974–2020). Their vinyl EP, Seaside, was released with Firebrand Records in 1978.
- Fuck Buttons: Two-piece experimental electro-noise duo (2004–present). Consisting of Andrew Hung and John Power, their debut album 'Street Horrrsing' was released in 2008.

== G ==
- Get the Blessing: (2008 – present) A Bristol jazz rock quartet who have released seven albums. Their debut All Is Yes won best album at the 2008 BBC Jazz Awards.
- Beth Gibbons: Singer and songwriter (born 1965, Exeter, England). She moved to Bristol at the age of 22 and is best known as the vocalist of Portishead.
- Glaxo Babies: Post-punk group (1977–1980 and 1985–1990). They released four singles and four albums, and recorded two sessions for the BBC's John Peel.
- Gonga Hard rock band (1997 – present). Signed to Invada Records.
- Graduate: New wave/Mod revival band from Bath (1979–1981). Most notable for having future Tears for Fears duo Curt Smith and Roland Orzabal as members. In 1980, they released an album, "Acting My Age", and a single "Elvis Should Play Ska".
- Gravenhurst: Gravenhurst (1999–2014) was a vehicle for the music of singer-songwriter, producer and multi-instrumentalist Nick Talbot and was signed to Warp Records.
- Roger Greenaway: Singer and songwriter (born 1938, Fishponds, Bristol). Has written many hits, usually with his writing partner Roger Cook. Was also a member of The Kestrels and David and Jonathan.
- Will Gregory: Songwriter and keyboardist (born 1959). Best known as part of electronic music group Goldfrapp. In the 1980s and 1990s he performed with artists including Tears for Fears, Peter Gabriel, The Cure and Portishead. Gregory also played the oboe for Tori Amos and has recorded with Paula Rae Gibson.

== H ==
- Head: Rock/proto-trip hop band (1987–1989). Included Nick Sheppard from The Cortinas (and briefly The Clash), and Gareth Sager. They released three albums in total.
- The Heads: Stoner rock band (1990–present) that have released seven albums, numerous EPs and singles. Between 1995 and 1999 they recorded three John Peel Sessions.
- Nellee Hooper: DJ, producer, remixer and composer (born 1963). Member of The Wild Bunch and known for his work with Björk, No Doubt, Gwen Stefani, Madonna, Garbage, U2, Sneaker Pimps, Soul II Soul and Massive Attack.
- Wayne Hussey: Singer, songwriter and guitarist (born 1958). Best known as the lead singer of The Mission and guitarist with The Sisters of Mercy.

== I ==
- Idles: punk rock band (2009–present).
- Ilya: trip hop/downtempo duo (2004–present). Consisting of Joanna Swan and Nick Pullen, their track 'Bellissimo' used a short film starring Martin Freeman as the accompanying music video.
- The Insects: Instrumental rock/soundtrack duo (1996–present). Tim Norfolk and Bob Locke were former members of Startled Insects and apart from co-writing songs for Massive Attack they wrote the soundtrack to the film Love and Death on Long Island, and received an Emmy for the documentary Life at the Edge.
- Interview: Five piece pop/rock band (1977–1981). Formed by Pete Allerhand, Alan Brain and Jeff Starrs in Bath, they added Manny Elias and Phil Crowther to complete their first line-up. They were signed to Virgin Records, and between 1978 and 1981 released two albums and four singles.

== J ==
- Jaguar: Heavy metal band, part of the new wave of British heavy metal movement (1979–1985 and 1999–present). Formed in December 1979 by Jeff Cox and Garry Pepperd. Guitarist Garry Pepperd has been the only constant member throughout the bands numerous line-ups. Their debut album 'Power Games' was released in 1983.
- JoBoxers: Pop/soul band (1981–1985). Formed when ex-Subway Sect members: guitarist Rob Marche, keyboardist Dave Collard, bassist Chris Bostock and drummer Sean McLusky, teamed up with American singer Dig Wayne. The band's debut single, 'Boxerbeat', peaked at No. 3 in the UK Singles Chart. Their next hit 'Just Got Lucky' made the UK Top 10 and US Top 40.

== K ==
- Nik Kershaw: Singer-songwriter (born 1958). Born in Bristol, he grew up in Ipswich, Suffolk. He had a number of hits during the mid-1980s, including a total of 50 weeks on the UK singles chart in 1984. He also wrote the 1991 UK No. 1 hit "The One and Only" for Chesney Hawkes.
- The Kestrels: Vocal harmony quartet (1955–1965). Initially a trio of Tony Burrows, Roger Greenaway, and Roger Maggs, they later expanded to a quartet with the addition to Jeff Williams. The group were in great demand as backup singers for other popular acts of the time, but never had a hit record themselves. In 1964 Roger Cook joined as a replacement for Pete Gullane, and this was the start of a very successful partnership he had with Roger Greenaway.
- KOAN Sound: Dubstep, Drum and Bass, Glitch Hop, Neuro Funk, Neuro Hop (2008–present). The duo consists of Will Weeks and Jim Bastow.
- Kosheen: trip hop, drum and bass, rock group (1999–present). The trio consists of producers Markee Substance (Mark Morrison) and Darren Decoder (Darren Beale), with singer and songwriter Sian Evans. Their first album, 'Resist' was released in 2001 and reached No. 8 in the UK album chart. The name of the band is a combination of the Japanese words for "old" ('ko') and "new" ('shin').
- The Korgis: Pop band (1978–1982, 1985–1986, 1990–1993, 2005–present). Originally composed of singer/bassist James Warren and singer/drummer Andy Davis, both former members of 1970s band Stackridge. Their 1980 single 'Everybody's Got to Learn Sometime' was a hit on both sides of the Atlantic.
- Krust: Keith Thompson or DJ Krust, is a drum and bass producer and DJ (born 1968). Part of the Reprazent collective, as well as releasing his own solo material.

== L ==
- Gerard Langley: Bristol Beat Poet, frontman and lyricist for Art Objects (band) and The Blue Aeroplanes. His "singing" style is similar to that of Bob Dylan.
- Alex Lee: Songwriter and multi-instrumentalist (born 1970). Played guitar and keyboards for The Jade, The Coltraines, The Blue Aeroplanes, Strangelove, Suede, Placebo and Goldfrapp amongst others.
- The Longest Johns: Folk music group (2012–present). They are known for performing folk music and sea shanties in the English tradition, as well as composing and recording their own songs in similar styles.
- Lupine Howl: Rock band (1999–2003). Formed by Sean Cook (vocalist, bassist), Mike Mooney (guitarist) and drummer Damon Reece, when they were sacked from Spiritualized by Jason Pierce. Two albums were released before they broke up.
- Rita Lynch: Musician and singer-songwriter, also a member of the Blue Aeroplanes contributing guitar and backing vocals.

== M ==
- Massive Attack: Trip hop/electronica band (1988–present). Originally consisted of DJs Grantley Marshall (Daddy G or "G"), Andrew Vowles (Mushroom or "Mush") and painter-turned-MC Robert Del Naja (3D or "D"), who met as members of The Wild Bunch.
- Maximum Joy: Post punk jazz/funk group (1979–1983). Formed from three members of the Glaxo Babies (Tony Wrafter, Dan Catis and Charlie Llewellin), with singer Janine Rainforth and John Waddington from The Pop Group. Their debut album 'Station MXJY' released in 1982.
- Mesh: Synthpop/SynthRock Duo (1991–present). Mark Hockings - vocals, guitars, keyboards, programming, lyrics and Richard Silverthorn - keyboards, programming, backing vocals. Mesh are joined by Vaughn George - Keyboards, backing vocals and Sean Suleman - Drums for their live shows.
- Monk & Canatella: trip hop/breakbeat duo (1994–present). Their second album Do Community Service included artwork from local graffiti artist Banksy. Portishead included a track titled "A Tribute to Monk and Canatella" on their 1995 CD single "Sour Times (Nobody Loves Me)".
- Movietone: Post-rock band (1994–present). Core members are Kate Wright and Rachel Brook (now Rachel Coe). Their 2003 album 'The Sand and The Stars' was recorded almost entirely live on a beach.
- Mr Fantastic: Hip Hop DJ and Producer from Bristol – part of Beat Route 38 and also solo artist. Harvey's Bristol Cream LP (2011), All The Critics (2011) and What U Rhymin' 4? (2012).

== N ==
- Naked Eyes: Synth based pop band (1982–1985 and 2006–present). Consisted of childhood friends Pete Byrne on vocals and Rob Fisher (1959–1999) on keyboards.
- Neon: Keyboard/Guitar band from Bath (1979–1981). Rob Fisher joined up with singer Pete Byrne to form the band, and their first single "Making Waves/Me I See You" was released on their own 3D Music label. The band later went on to recruit Neil Taylor, Manny Elias, Curt Smith and Roland Orzabal, before they finally broke up in December 1981.
- New Rhodes: (2001–present): Indie band consisting of James Williams, Joe Gascoigne, Jack Ashdown and Tim Desmond. In 2006 they released their first album "Songs From The Lodge" and in 2009 released their second LP, "Everybody Loves A Scene".

== O ==
- Onslaught: Thrash metal band initially active from 1983 to 1991, and then reforming in 2004. The band initially drew influence from second wave punk rock bands such as Discharge and The Exploited, and then adopted a straightforward thrash metal sound.

== P ==
- Pigbag: Post punk/funk band from Cheltenham (1980–1983). They included ex-The Pop Group bassist, Simon Underwood. Scored a UK No. 3 hit with their 1982 single 'Papa's Got A Brand New Pigbag'.
- Patrick Duff: lead singer with Strangelove and now solo artist who was born on the top floor of a house in Redland
- John Perry: Played in many Bristol bands till moving to London and forming The Only Ones with Peter Perrett. Best known for their single Another Girl, Another Planet.
- Phaeleh: multi-instrumentalist, producer and DJ (2008–present). Produces cinematic electronica with roots in dubstep, garage, and house.
- The Pigs: punk band (1977–1978, 2009–present). They recorded the Youthanasia EP for New Bristol Records in 1977. These and other tracks were re-released by Bristol Archive Records in 2010.
- Pigsty Hill Light Orchestra: Folk/Scrumpy and Western band (1968–1979, 1988–1992). An eccentric band formed in early 1968 to play a fusion of comedy, jazz, and folk music, they also featured an eclectic mix of instruments, some of them home-made, such as the egg-cupaphone and the ballcockaphone. They also provided backing for Fred Wedlock on his album, The Folker. They disbanded in 1979, but in 1988 reformed with singer Hannah Wedlock (Fred's daughter).
- The Pop Group: Post punk band with jazz influences (1978–1981). Featuring singer Mark Stewart, Gareth Sager and Dan Catis (who replaced Simon Underwood). The band split in 1981, after legal wranglings and internal disagreements. Members of the group went on to form bands including Pigbag, Maximum Joy, Head and Rip Rig & Panic.
- Portishead: trip hop band and purveyors of the Bristol Sound (1991–present). Consists of Geoff Barrow, Beth Gibbons and Adrian Utley. Their 1994 debut album Dummy reached No. 2 on the UK Album Chart and won the 1995 Mercury Prize.
- Propellerheads: An electronic act from Bath who had a hit album in 1998, complete with the hit single "Bang On!".

== R ==
- Reprazent: Drum and bass collective founded by Roni Size. Apart from Roni Size, original members included DJ Die, DJ Suv, Krust, Onallee, Dynamite MC Si John and Rob Merrill. They won the Mercury Prize for their album "New Forms" in 1997.
- Returning We Hear the Larks: Progressive metal solo project of multi-instrumentalist Jack Noble, known as part of the expanding djent scene.
- Rip Rig + Panic: Post punk band (1981–1983). Fronted by Andrea Oliver, its members included singer Neneh Cherry, Sean Oliver, Mark Springer, and Gareth Sager and Bruce Smith (both from The Pop Group). The band notably made a guest appearance in an episode of the British sitcom The Young Ones performing their 1982 single 'You're My Kind of Climate'.

== S ==
- Andy Sheppard: Jazz saxophonist and composer (born 1957).
- The Silhouettes: Formerly The Falcons. A 7-piece rock and roll band, prominent in the early 1960s. Brian Howard (vocals), Jerry Hatfield (lead guitar), Dave Johnson (bass), Roger Parker (rhythm), Alan Laker (keyboards), Nick Munton (sax), Mike J Lewis (drums). Support to numerous top acts of the era throughout the UK.
- Nick Sheppard: Guitarist and songwriter (born 1960). Came to prominence at the age of 16 with punk band The Cortinas, with recordings on Step Forward Records and CBS. After they disbanded he was a member of The Viceroys and The Spics. After The Clash sacked Mick Jones in 1983, Sheppard toured America and Europe with them and played on their final album 'Cut the Crap'. He then joined up with Gareth Sager to form Head.
- Roni Size: Ryan Williams (Roni Size) is a music producer and DJ (born 1969). He came to prominence in 1997 as the founder and leader of Reprazent, a drum and bass collective. They won the Mercury Prize for their album "New Forms" in 1997.
- Curt Smith: Musician and songwriter (born 1961, Bath). Best known for his work with Roland Orzabal as Tears for Fears. Smith and Orzabal met as teenagers and formed their first band at school, then went on to form the ska influenced Graduate. They were also session musicians for the band Neon. Smith has released three albums as a solo artist, the last two in association with guitarist-producer Charlton Pettus.
- Smith & Mighty: drum and bass/trip hop duo (1987–present), consisting of Rob Smith and Ray Mighty, with Peter D Rose. Their early work included breakbeat versions of "Walk On By" and "Anyone Who Had a Heart", by Burt Bacharach/Hal David.
- Sneaky Bat Machine: Cybergoth band (1997–2000). The band consisted of Sneakybat (aka Ross Tregenza), Evil C (aka Crash 303, aka Clive Lewis), and Maxislag (aka Max Niblock). In 2000 the band changed its name (to Goteki), and its musical direction to 'lo-fi phuturists'. They released a number of albums before disbanding in 2006.
- Specimen: A Glam Goth band (1980–1985 and 2006–present). Guitarist/vocalist Jon Klein was formerly in the band Europeans, and later went on to work with Siouxie & the Banshees. Although their record output was not prolific, they are credited as one of the pioneers of the Gothic movement.
- Spiro, a band who emerged in 1993 from the Bristol session scene, combining folk, Celtic, minimalist, ambient and dance influences. They reached a higher level of fame when Peter Gabriel signed them to his world label Real World Records.
- Stackridge: The band mix folk, pop and progressive rock with quirky humour (1969–1976, 1999–2000, 2007–present). Formed by Andy Davis and James "Crun" Walter, their debut single was Dora the Female Explorer. They played the first and last notes at the first ever Glastonbury Festival in 1970. James Warren and Andy Davis went on to form The Korgis.
- Stanton Warriors: Breakbeat duo Dominic Butler and Mark Yardley (1997–present). They are a DJ and producer team of Breakbeat electronic dance music. Their name was originally conceived from one of the warriors tripping over a "Stanton Warrior" draincover on Tower Bridge, London.
- Stantz: Bristol based multi instrumentalist / producer and performer composing a mixture of world sounds with contemporary dance music such as garage, dubstep and IDM
- Startled Insects: Synthpop/Rock band (1983–1996). Originally a collective of three producers/multi-instrumentalists (Tim Norfolk, Bob Locke and Richard Grassby-Lewis), they were commissioned by the BBC to produce music for two of their wildlife documentaries.
- Stereo Models: New wave band (1971–1981). The Stereo Models song 'Move Fast-Stay Ahead, released on the Bristol compilation album Avon Calling in 1979.
- Mark Stewart: Vocalist, songwriter, and pioneer of industrial hip-hop (1960–2023). Founding member of The Pop Group, after their split in 1981 he recorded as a solo artist, and with The Maffia. He has been a major influence on Bristol's eclectic music scene where he blended diverse genres of dub, funk, punk, techno, and electro noise along with political lyrics.
- The Stingrays: New wave band (1977–current). The line-up included, amongst others: Russ Mainwaring, Chris Bostock, Sean McLuskey, and Bill Stair. Current Line up is Russ Mainwaring (guitar/vocals), Paul Matthews (bass) and Richard H. Meredith (drums).
- Strangelove: (1991–1998). The initial line up was: Patrick Duff (vocals, guitar), Alex Lee (guitar, keyboards), Julian Pransky-Poole (guitar), Joe Allen (bass) and David Francolini (drums). Francolini played two gigs with the band, before being replaced by John Langley, then Nick Powell (keyboards) joined in late 1995. Their 1996 single 'Beautiful Alone' reached No. 34 in the UK Chart.
- Steve Street: Bassist with Europeans, and later joined Apartment, then briefly Interview. He recorded demos at his studio (GBH) for The Pop Group and the Glaxo Babies, and subsequently went on to engineer and produce a number of other Bristol-based bands including Electric Guitars, The X-Certs, Vice Squad and The Blue Aeroplanes.
- Svalbard (band): A Post-hardcore/blackgaze band formed in 2011, Svalbard are seen as hugely important and influentual to the blackgaze genre. Consists of Serena Cherry (Vocals and guitars), Liam Phelan (Vocals and guitars), Matt Francis (Bass), and Mark Liley (Drums). Set to break up at the end of 2026, the band will end their musical career with 4 studio albums.

== T ==
- Talisman: Multi-racial Reggae Band who provided Recreational Records with their very first single and UK Indie Chart hit (#17).
- TC: drum and bass producer and DJ Tom Casswell.
- Tears for Fears: Pop rock duo from Bath (1981–present). Formed by Roland Orzabal and Curt Smith after the break-up of New wave/Mod revival band Graduate. They were initially called History of Headaches, but the change in name was inspired by the Primal Therapy theory, developed by the American psychologist Arthur Janov; in 'Prisoners of Pain' (1980) Janov suggested "tears as a replacement from fears".
- The Dirty Drugs: Prog / Alt Rock four piece - Jamie Ahsley (Vocals / Guitar), Paul Watson (Lead Guitar / backing Vocals), David Granberg (Bass), Richard Murphy (Drums) (1999–2005).
- The Third Eye Foundation: Electronic music band (1996–2001).
- Torpedo: reggae band (1982–1985), Elvis Simpson (bass), Simon Cox (keyboards/vocals, Martin Gay (drums), Dennis Brown (guitar/vocals), Cassius Beckford (sax)
- Tricky: Adrian Nicholas M. Thaws is a trip hop rapper, lyricist, musician, producer and actor (born 1968). Originally involved with The Wild Bunch and Massive Attack, his 1995 debut album
- Turbowolf: Rock band formed 2008 with a sound that has been noted as containing elements of rock and roll, psychedelia, punk rock and electronica.

== U ==
- Up, Bustle and Out: Musicians and recording artists (1994–present), consisting of DJ D. "Ein" Fell (also known as Clandestine Ein), producer-performer Rupert Mould (also known as Sêenor Roody)and Dave Cridge (Beat Keeper and mainstay tour DJ). Their music combines jazz, hip-hop and funk, but with distinctly South American and Cuban influences.

== V ==
- Vice Squad: Punk band (1978–1985 and 1997–present). The original group formed from two other local punk bands: The Contingent and TV Brakes, and included songwriter, vocalist and Punk Pin-Up Beki Bondage. They set up Riot City Records with Simon Edwards, and it became one of the major punk labels of the era. Their 1981 debut single "Last Rockers" sold over 20,000 copies.
- Joe Volk: solo artist signed to Invada. Debut album 'Derwent Waters Saint' was recorded and produced by Portishead's Adrian Utley. Original singer for Bristol band Gonga. He is the lyricist and singer in Crippled Black Phoenix.
- Andrew Vowles: DJ and songwriter (born 1967). Originally in The Wild Bunch and founding member of Massive Attack. He left Massive Attack shortly after the release of their 1998 album, 'Mezzanine', due to profound differences of opinion in the direction the band should go.

== W ==
- Nick Warren: is an English house DJ and producer. He is well known for his eight albums released in the Global Underground series and as a member of the duo Way Out West. He is head of A&R for the progressive house and breaks record label Hope Recordings.
- Way Out West: House, trance and progressive breaks duo (1994–present). They are producers and DJs Jody Wisternoff and Nick Warren. Their song "Don't Forget Me" has been featured in season two of Grey's Anatomy, "Melt" was used in The O.C., and a loop of their song "The Gift" is used for the title theme on the MTV show True Life.
- Fred Wedlock: Folk and Scrumpy and Western singer (1942–2010). Former teacher who took up music full-time in the 1970s, and best known for his 1981 UK hit single, "The Oldest Swinger in Town".
- Ben Westbeech: DJ, singer and producer originating from Bristol. He trained as a cellist and vocalist, and his influences include House, Rock n Roll, punk, jazz and hip hop. He has appeared on Later... with Jools Holland alongside Paul McCartney and Björk.
- The Wild Bunch: Proto-Bristol Sound (trip hop) sound system based in the St Pauls district of Bristol (1983–1986). Notable members included at one time or another were: Nellee Hooper, Tricky, and the trio Robert Del Naja (3D), Grant Marshall (Daddy G) and Andrew Vowles (Mushroom) who went on to form Massive Attack.
- Jody Wisternoff: is best known as one half of the Bristol progressive house duo Way Out West and as a producer of dance music spanning early 1990s hardcore to electro house.
- The Wurzels: Scrumpy and Western band (1966–present). Formed as a backing group for, and by, singer/songwriter Adge Cutler. They continued after Cutlers' death in 1974 and are probably best known for their 1976 UK No. 1 hit 'The Combine Harvester'.
- Robert Wyatt: Percussionist, singer, and composer (born 1945). Founding member of the influential Canterbury scene band Soft Machine. As well as his band and solo work, he has also been a prolific collaborator with other musicians. The Tears for Fears song "I Believe" from 'Songs from the Big Chair' (1985) is dedicated to Wyatt.

== Z ==
- Zoon van snooK: Solo songwriter, producer and remixer of Oddtronica (2008–present). His debut album (Falling from) The Nutty Tree was released on Mush Records in December 2010 and the second album The Bridge Between Life & Death released on Lo Recordings in April 2013.

== See also ==
- Ashton Court Festival
- Culture of Bristol
- List of record labels from Bristol
- Bristol record labels
