= Essential Bop =

Defunct English post-punk/art band

- Also known as: Essence of Bop
- Origin: Bristol, England
- Genres: Post-punk
- Years active: 1978–1981, 1984–1985
- Labels: Heartbeat; Monopause; Bristol Recorder; TSAR; Bristol Archive
- Past members: Steve Bush; Mike Fewings; Simon Tyler; Dave Robinson; Nick Tufnell; Seng-gye Tombs Curtis; Danny Cotterill; Phil Howard; John Langley; Martin Kiernan
- Website: www.myspace.com/essentialbop

Essential Bop were an English, Bristol-based post-punk/art band, formed in early 1978 by Dave Robinson (who had played bass with Champion Jack Dupree and Joe Cocker), with an initial line-up of Steve Bush (singer, originally in The Biros), Mike Fewings (guitar, from The Cortinas and Colortapes), Simon Tyler (keyboards, from Dragon Sandwich), Nick Tufnell (drums) and Seng-gye Tombs Curtis ("visualist"). According to Steve Bush, they were originally going to be called Essence of Bop, but instead opted for Essential Bop.

== Career ==
Their first release was the track "Chronicle" on the seminal 1979 Bristol compilation LP/CD Avon Calling. This was followed by line-up changes and the 1980 EP Eloquent Sounds on their own Monopause label. This resulted in NME journalist Paul Morley interviewing Steve Bush and writing that Essential Bop would be one of the bands that would make it in the 1980s.

Further line-up changes in 1981 saw them emerge as a guitarless four-piece band with 2 tracks on Bristol Recorder 3 and their second release on Monopause of the single "Croaked/Butler (In Running Shorts)". The single received some notice in the New York independent charts and resulted in a US east coast tour in the summer of 1981; however the band split after their return.

A third single "Monkey Glands" was never released, but did appear on both of the band's albums. Their second compilation CD Chronicles included the track "Mau Mau" which was recorded in 1981 by Art Objects/The Blue Aeroplanes and included on their cassette/CD Weird Shit. Gerard Langley of The Blue Aeroplanes has a long history of producing, performing and writing with Steve Bush, ever since their initial group The Biros. Langley on the cover notes of the Avon Calling CD referred to Essential Bop as "closet Doors fans with a grudge."

In 1984, Steve Bush and Simon Tyler reformed the band in London with Mike Fewings on bass and Martin Kiernan on drums, and subsequently released their debut LP on TSAR, The Flick Was Boss. The album included tracks from a variety of sources and line-ups, covering the years 1979, 1980, 1981 and two new songs from 1984. The band folded for good in 1985.

Bristol Archive Records released a second compilation album in 2008 called Chronicles, which included both studio and live tracks. The Avon Calling 2 CD from 2010 also included the track "Audition Room" by the band.

As of autumn 2016, work was due to start on a live album comprising recordings from the late 1970s and early 1980s.

== Steve Bush ==
Steve Bush later went on to collaborate with Christian Clarke of Various Artists and The Art Objects as a duo, alternatively known as 'A Pair of Blue Eyes' or 'Bush & Clarke', under which latter name they released the Allergies album. This album was produced by Stephen Street who later found fame as a producer/writer with bands such as The Smiths, Blur, The Libertines and Morrissey. Stephen Street was also responsible for assigning Andrew Paresi as the drummer for A Pair of Blue Eyes, who became a part of Morrissey's first solo band shortly afterwards. Bush also produced a solo album, Blossom Freak (Green Goat 2001), and also released the album Row of Ashes (Green Goat Records) with Fran Fey. Bush and Fey's latest album Earl Grey and Leather was released in November 2016, also on Green Goat Records.

== See also ==
- Avon Calling
- Culture of Bristol
- Heartbeat Records
- List of Bands from Bristol
