= The Escape (band) =

English new wave band

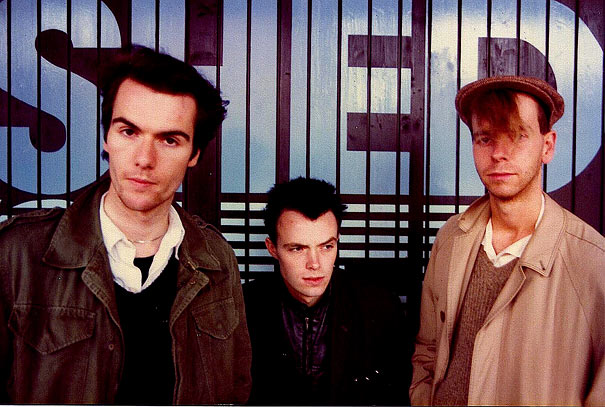
- The Escape - Bristol 1982

Background information
- Origin: Bristol, England
- Genres: New wave
- Years active: 1981–1984
- Labels: Volatile, Phonogram/Mercury, Bristol Archive Records
- Past members: Alan Griffiths; Emil; Stuart Morgan
- Website: The Escape info at Bristol Archive Records

The Escape were an English new wave band from Bristol, formed in 1981 by Alan Griffiths (vocals/guitar) and Emil (drums) from Apartment with bassist Stuart Morgan.

They released one single, "NoGo" / "I'll Pretend to Kill You" in 1982 on their own Volatile Records label. In early 1983, they were signed by Phonogram Records and released two further singles. In late 1983, the band toured as the support act for Tears for Fears; this expanded touring line up included guest keyboardist/backing vocalist Nicky Holland along with Pat Tedd on guitar and Peter Evans on drums. However, success eluded them and the band split up in late 1984. Both Holland and Griffiths went on to tour with Tears for Fears in 1985 on The Big Chair world tour, and both would become highly involved with the band (Holland co-wrote most of 1989's The Seeds of Love album, and Alan Griffiths later co-wrote and co-produced Elemental (1993) and Raoul and the Kings of Spain (1995), as well as Roland Orzabal's 2001 solo album Tomcats Screaming Outside).

Stuart Morgan went on to become a bass tech for U2.

In 2008, Bristol Archive Records released a CD and downloadable album by The Escape called Is Nothing Sacred.

Alan Griffiths died on 23 March 2017 after a short illness with cancer. Dave Massey wrote a tribute and an obituary that appeared in The Guardian print edition and online.

A posthumous live album by the band, Live in 1982, featuring recordings made on tour that year was released on CD and online in 2018 through BristolArchiveRecords.com. The album was compiled and produced by Dave Massey from his own personal archives, and he also contributed liner notes based on his experiences working with the band at the time.

== Discography ==
=== Albums ===
- Is Nothing Sacred (2008), Bristol Archive Records (download)
- Live in 1982 (2018), Bristol Archive Records (CD/download)

=== Singles ===
- "NoGo" / "I'll Pretend to Kill You" (1982), Volatile Records
- "Amsterdam" / "Girl in the Phone Box" (1983), Phonogram Records
- "Russian Lady" / "Freezer" (1984), Phonogram Records

== See also ==
- List of Bands from Bristol
- Culture of Bristol
- Heartbeat Records
- Avon Calling
