= Stereo Models =

English new wave music group

- Origin: Bristol, England
- Genres: New wave
- Instruments: Guitars
- Years active: 1979–1981
- Labels: Heartbeat, Cherry Red

Stereo Models were an English new wave group, formed in 1979 in Bristol, England. They are best known for the track "Move Fast-Stay Ahead", on the Bristol compilation album, Avon Calling, released by Heartbeat Records in 1979. Rick Joseph of NME writing at the time of the original release said, 'The joys of profligate living are eulogised in "Move Fast, Stay Ahead", a reckless, infectious punkabilly chorus from Stereo Models'. The track was written by Russ Thomas, who provided vocals and played guitar, and was recorded at Horizon Studios, Coventry. The drummer was Mark Hatwood, formally of Coventry band Squad, which included Terry Hall in their line-up. Later Paul Tyler was added on bass and Steve Libby on keyboards.

In 1980 Tyler left and Hatwood got disillusioned and joined Mud - later to write film music. Thomas and Libby carried on under the name of Metropolis, with Geoff Fulton on bass and Simon Phillips on drums. In 1981 Libby left to join The Agents, and then Force Majeure. Later in the year the rest of the band split up. Tyler continues composing and recording music involving Steve Libby on some of his work.

In 2005 the original LP, Avon Calling, was re-released by Cherry Red as a double album.

In 2010, Heartbeat and Bristol Archive Records brought out a CD follow-up to the original album, calling it Avon Calling 2. Included on this CD release is the Stereo Models track "Middle Of Nowhere".

In 2012, Cherry Red released a download only, album called "Keep on Runnin' - an Alternative Soundtrack to the London Games" that included the Stereo Models "Move Fast, Stay Ahead".

== See also ==
- List of Bands from Bristol
