= The Pigs =

English punk rock band

- Cover of their EP, "Youthanasia"

Background information
- Origin: Bristol, England
- Genres: Punk rock
- Years active: 1977–1978, 2009–present
- Labels: New Bristol Records; Bristol Archive Records
- Members: Eamonn McAndrew; Kit Gould; Ricky Galli; Paolo Mastrandrea
- Past members: Nigel Robinson
- Website: The Pigs on myspace

The Pigs are an English, Bristol-based punk rock band formed in 1977. They recorded an EP, Youthanasia, for independent label New Bristol Records in August of that year. Following renewed interest in the band after their original recordings were re-released by Bristol Archive Records in 2009, the Pigs reformed and are currently recording again.

== Biography ==
The band first got together at Henbury School. They launched themselves as a punk band after seeing the Cortinas, the Damned, the Jam and other early punk gigs in Bristol. After just a few gigs these ‘aggressive, confrontational upstarts’ were spotted by punk impresario Miles Copeland who ran Step Forward Records with Mark P. Copeland saw the Pigs supporting Generation X at Chutes on Bristol's Park Street and arranged for them to record at Sound Conception studios. Four tracks were released as an EP on a new label, New Bristol Records. The record was a success in Bristol and received repeated plays (at various speeds; the label misstated 33 rpm) from John Peel, foremost champion of new music on UK radio at that time.

The Pigs featured on bills with bands such as Siouxsie and the Banshees and their high-energy live shows generated positive reviews in the UK's influential weekly music press with Simon Kinnersley in the Melody Maker citing the 'verve and aggression of the Who in their heyday' while jazz authority Ian Carr emphasised their 'wired momentum'. Unfortunately the chance to open for the Sex Pistols went up in smoke when the venue mysteriously burned down the night before the gig. Nevertheless, the EP enabled the Pigs to play further afield, at the Marquee in London and at the Roxy Club. They supported the Cortinas on a number of dates. However disillusionment set in at the increasingly mainstream direction of the punk movement and early in 1978 they split up.

With the release of numerous Pigs recordings that had not previously seen the light of day by Bristol Archive Records in 2009, tracks which ‘totally capture the essence of a time now gone’ according to Record Collector, the band was offered the chance to play gigs again, in Bristol and elsewhere. In 2010 they played the Rebellion festival in Blackpool, and again in 2012. In 2012 they also played the Nel Nome del Rock festival in Italy and other gigs on the continent and in the UK. A CD has been released, called Put It Down, which features newly recorded versions of their original material as well as new songs.

In 2020, after all previous vinyl copies had sold out following live shows the band had played in the country, Italian labels Rave Up Records and Breakout Records collaborated to release the original Pigs recordings in a limited edition on 12-inch vinyl.

They are not to be confused with the Australian country-folk music band.

== Discography ==
=== EP ===
- "Youthanasia/They Say/Psychopath/National Front" (New Bristol, NBR 01, August 1977)

=== Albums ===
- 1977 (Bristol Archive, ARC090V, August 2010)
- Put It Down (self released, February 2011)
- Youthanasia (Rave Up, EPS 18 / Breakout Records, BRO12, November 2020)

=== Compilations ===
- England Belongs To Me - Volume 3 (Various artists, 77 Records, unofficial vinyl, 1997; features "Psychopath")
- Screaming Fists - Volume 2 (Various artists, LAMF 7735, unofficial vinyl, France, 1998; features "They Say" and "National Front"),
- The Morning After - Volume 3 (Various artists, unofficial CD, 2001; features "Psychopath")
- Bristol - the Punk Explosion (Various artists, Bristol Archive, ARC154CD, June 2010; features "National Front" and "Youthanasia")
- Action Time Vision: A Story of UK Independent Punk 1976-1979 {Various artists, Cherry Red, CRCDBOX27, November 2016; features "Youthanasia")
- The Bristol Punk Explosion 1977-1979 (Various artists, Bristol Archive, ARC380V, limited-edition vinyl, November 2023; features "Youthanasia")
- The Bristol Punk Explosion Vol 2 1977-1981 (Various artists, Bristol Archive, ARC383V, limited-edition vinyl, June 2024; features "Psychopath")

== See also ==
- List of British punk bands
- List of bands from Bristol
- List of record labels from Bristol
- Culture of Bristol
