= Interview (band) =

English pop/rock band

- Cover of Snakes and Lovers

Background information
- Origin: Bath, England
- Genres: New wave; pop rock; power pop
- Years active: 1977–1981
- Label: Virgin
- Past members: Pete Allerhand; Alan Brain; Jeff Starrs; Manny Elias; Phil Crowther; Alfie Agius; Steve Street
- Website: Interviewtheband.com

Interview were a five-piece pop/rock band from Bath, Somerset, England. They were signed to Virgin Records, and between 1978 and 1981 released two albums and four singles.

== Career ==
Originally formed in 1977 by Pete Allerhand, Alan Brain and Jeff Starrs in Bath, they added Manny Elias (later of Tears for Fears) on drums and Phil Crowther on bass. In 1978, they signed up to a five album recording contract with Virgin.

Their debut album, Big Oceans, produced by Colin Thurston, was released in 1978 consisted of both hard-edged power pop ("You Didn't Have to Lie to Me", "Academies to Anger") and more expansive, somber material ("Shipyards") that signaled the direction the band were to take on their second effort. Peter Gabriel also did a session with the band, producing demo versions of "You Didn't Have to Lie to Me", "That Kind of Boy" and "Shipyards", and these were subsequently released as archive material.

For that next album, Snakes and Lovers (released in the U.S. eponymously titled Interview with different artwork and without the words "Snakes and Lovers" on the sleeve), which was produced by Mick Glossop, they brought in bassist Alfie Agius, who was associated with The Teardrop Explodes. This album has over subsequent years received critical acclaim, however at the time, it was poorly promoted by Virgin and was ignored by radio and the music press. According to an interview with Jeff Starrs in 1997, "soon after its release we did support dates in the UK with the Pretenders and Peter Gabriel whilst Virgin closely watched the sales graphs in the US climb. At one point, it seemed inevitable that we should go over and promote but Virgin would always say 'wait and see if the graph keeps going up'! Of course, after a while, it went down and a tour was decided against...".

The band split up in 1981.

== Discography ==
=== Albums ===
- Big Oceans (June, 1979, Virgin, UK, LP, V 2123)
- Snakes and Lovers (1980, Virgin, UK, LP, V 2157), released in U.S. as Interview (1980, Virgin distributed by Atlantic/Warner, U.S., LP, VA 13141; songs in different order, some with different lengths)

=== Singles ===
- "Birmingham" / "New Hearts in Action" (1978, Virgin, UK, 7", VS 218)
- "You Didn't Have to Lie to Me" / "That Kind of Boy" (1979, Virgin, UK, 7", VS 249)
- "To the People" / "Hart Crane in Mexico" (1979, Virgin, UK, 7", VS 310)
- "Hide and Seek" / "Yes Man" (1980, Virgin, UK, 7", VS 331)

=== Reissues and archive releases ===
Self-released CDs

- Big Oceans (CD)
- Snakes and Lovers (CD)
- Singles (CD)
- The First Demos (CD)
- The Last Demos (CD)
- Live in Edinburgh (CD)

== See also ==
- Culture of Bristol
- List of bands from Bristol
- Bristol Archive Records
