= Recreational Records =

British record label

- Parent company: Revolver
- Founded: 1981
- Defunct: 1982
- Distributor: The Cartel
- Country of origin: United Kingdom
- Location: Bristol

Recreational Records was a British record label set up in 1981 by the Bristol record shop and distributor Revolver Records. Originally formed as an independent record label with its own distribution as part of the Cartel.

== Revolver Records and the Cartel ==
Revolver Records (not to be confused with Revolver Music) was a long established record store based at The Triangle, Clifton, Bristol, and in the 1970s was a hangout of Mark Stewart, Nick Sheppard, and other local musicians. It also had a distribution arm, which allowed it to distribute its own records (under the Recreational label) and those of other indie labels (Monopause Records, etc.) via its participation in the Cartel.

The Cartel was a co-operative record distribution organisation in the United Kingdom, set up by a number of small independent record labels to handle their distribution to record shops. By pooling their resources it allowed them to compete with the larger distribution operations of the major record labels, and also to gain access to the larger shop chains. The association of regional distributors included some of the most notable labels of the 1980s UK post-punk and indie scene: Backs (Norwich), Fast Forward (Edinburgh), Native (Sheffield), Nine Mile (Leamington Spa), Probe (Liverpool), Revolver (Bristol), Red Rhino (York) and Rough Trade (London).

== Artists ==
- Animal Magic: Were "a brassy Bristol sextet led by vocalist Howard Purse, they swiftly developed from a punk to a hardcore dancefloor sensibility."
- Electric Guitars: Their first single was on Fried Egg Records and they had tracks on the first Bristol Recorder, before their Recreational single. They later went on to join Stiff Records and release a further two singles.
- Ivory Coasters: Afro beat/Highlife band that at one time included Prince Nico Mbarga. They also released the 12" single 'Roscoe/Kinzengi Nzengi/1Z4IC', on Politone (PT001) in 1981.
- Mouth: After their single on Recreational, this funk band went on to release records on the Y label, including the track 'Voyage to the Bottom of the Sea', on the 1982 'Birth of the Y' compilation LP.
- Scream And Dance: Tribal funk band. ‘In Rhythm’ was remixed by DJ Marcelle/Another Nice Mess and released on a German double LP, ‘Meets Her Soulmates At Faust Studio Deejay Laboratory’ in 2008.
- Talisman: A multi-racial Reggae Band who provided the labels very first single and UK Indie Chart hit (No. 17). Dole Age also became Single of the Week and the Record Sleeve of the Year in the NME. In 1982 as well as playing the Glastonbury Festival, they were the opening act for the Rolling Stones concert at Ashton Gate, Bristol.
- The X-Certs: Started off as a punk band in 1978 and recorded several tracks for Heartbeat Records, had two tracks on Bristol Recorder 2, and were including reggae by the time of their 1981 Recreational single. This was to be their last recording as they split up in early 1981.

== Releases ==
The Recreational catalogue listed singles with the Sport prefix (some had 7" and 12" versions), apart from the X-Certs 7" single Together/Untogether, which is listed as Play 1.

=== Singles ===
Cat No.	Artist	Title	Date	Configuration
PLAY 1	The X-Certs	Together/Untogether	1981	7”
SPORT 1	Talisman	Dole Age/Free Speech	1981	7”
SPORT 12	Talisman	Dole Age/Free Speech	1981	12”
SPORT 2	Talisman	Run Come Girl/Wicked Dem	1981	7”
SPORT 22	Talisman	Run Come Girl/Wicked Dem	1981	12”
SPORT 3	Mouth	Ooh, Ah, Yeah!/Ooh?	1981	7”
SPORT 4	Electric Guitars	Work/Don't Wake The Baby	1981	7”
SPORT 52	Animal Magic	Get It Right/Grip/Crow Black/Go Funky-Doo-Lally	1982	12”
SPORT 6	Ivory Coasters	Mungaka Makossa/Chavakali Charlie	1982	7”
SPORT 62	Ivory Coasters	Mungaka Makossa/Chavakali Charlie/The Bongo That Ate Pik Botha	1982	12”
SPORT 7	Scream And Dance	In Rhythm/Giacometti	1982	7”
SPORT 72	Scream And Dance	In Rhythm/In Pink & Black/Giacometti/Giacometti (wicked mix)	1982	12”
SPORT 8	Animal Magic	Standard Man/Trash That Blad!	1982	7”

== Reissues on other labels ==
Bristol Archive Records are currently providing Recreational back catalogue tracks for download, through the usual outlets (Amazon, iTunes, etc.).

== See also ==
- List of bands from Bristol
- Culture of Bristol
- List of independent UK record labels
- List of record labels from Bristol
