= Head (band) =

Late 1980s English rock band

- Origin: Bristol, England
- Genres: Trip hop, alternative rock
- Years active: 1987–1989
- Labels: Virgin Records
- Past members: Rich Beale; Gareth Sager; Nick Sheppard

Head were an English rock band of the late 1980s.

== History ==
After making three albums and a few singles the Bristol-based combo faded away. Nick Sheppard previously played in The Cortinas and The Clash. Gareth Sager previously played in The Pop Group, and in Rip Rig + Panic with Neneh Cherry.

Although they never achieved major sales they are now belatedly acknowledged as a forerunner of today's trip hop scene.

The title of the second album is a reference to Tales of Ordinary Madness, a film based on the work of poet Charles Bukowski.

== Discography ==
- A Snog on the Rocks (1987)
- Tales of Ordinary Madness (1988)
- Intoxicator (1989)

== Members ==
- Rich "Clevedon Pier" Beale - lead vocals
- Gareth "Hank Sinclair" Sager - guitar, keyboards, most songwriting
- Nick "Chopper Harris", "Candy Horsebreath" Sheppard - guitar
- Paul "Cheese Jackson" Francis - bass
- John Slight - bass (Virgin Records)
- Jamie "Plastic Bag" Hill - drums
- Mark "SMT" Taylor - bass

== See also ==
- Culture of Bristol
- List of bands from Bristol
- Bristol Sound
