= Jon Klein (musician) =

English musician (born 1960)

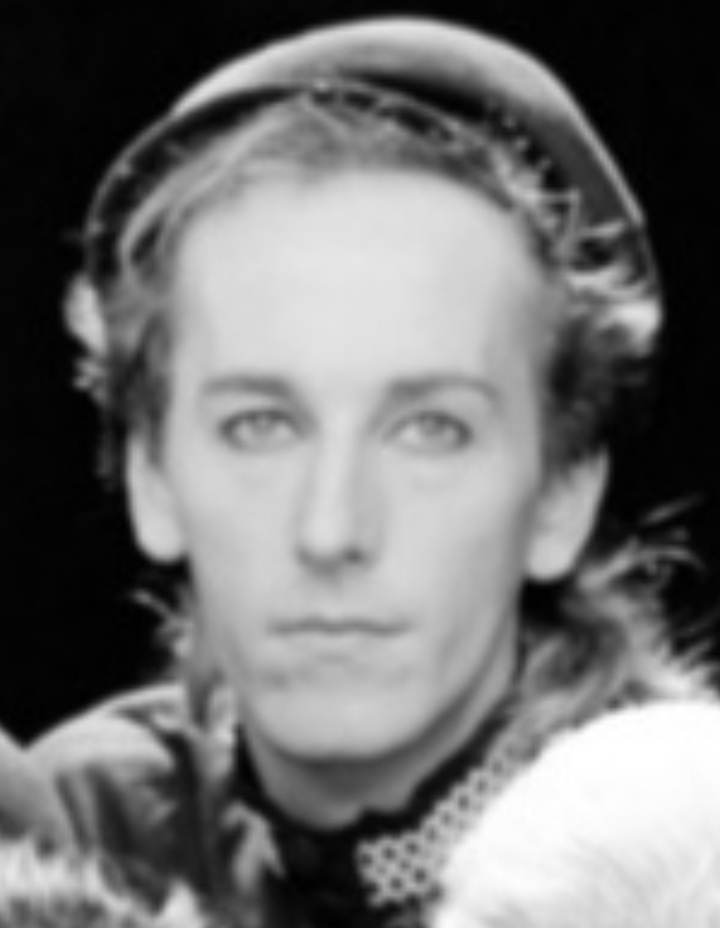
- Klein in 1988

Background information
- Born: Jonathan David Klein; 9 April 1960 (age 65); Bristol, England
- Genres: Post-punk, gothic rock, new wave, alternative rock, experimental
- Instruments: Guitar, vocals
- Years active: 1977–present
- Website: Official website

Jonathan David Klein (born 9 April 1960) known professionally as Jon Klein and sometimes as John Kline, is an English guitarist and producer, best known for being a member of Siouxsie and the Banshees for seven years, from 1987 until 1994. Klein has worked for other artists including Talvin Singh and Sinéad O'Connor. More recently he has worked as a co-producer and guitarist with Fangoria, Space Tribe, ESP, Shriekback, Micko and the Mellotronics and Jah Wobble.

== Early years, Specimen and the Batcave ==
He bought an electric guitar at the age of 14. In 1978, he became a member of Bristol band Europeans. In 1980, he formed Bristol band Specimen with Ollie Wisdom and Kev Mills. In 1982, after moving in London and renting a place in Soho, Klein co-founded with Wisdom the club the Batcave, which was a party on Wednesday nights at The Gargoyle. Klein and Wisdom then opened a Batcave club night in New-York.

== Siouxsie and the Banshees (1987–1994) ==
In 1987, he became a full-time member of Siouxsie and the Banshees. He recorded three albums with the band, Peepshow in 1988, Superstition in 1991 and the Rapture in 1995. In between tours he used to do a puppet show for local kids. With the Banshees, he took part in the inaugural Lollapalooza festival in 1991 as second headliners. Peer Robin Finck of Nine Inch Nails, praised Klein as inspirational. Finck stated: "One guitar player that really was a memorable vision for me was Jon Klein, who I’d seen play with Siouxsie and the Banshees a couple of times [...]. I really liked his playful demeanour within that sort of dramatic scenario of the Banshees. He was a bit of a blend of Buster Keaton and Ace Frehley to me. [...] I felt like he was wistfully playful, yet was set inside of a darker narrative that, I dunno, something about his performance really resonated with me. He was seeming to polish cymbals in the middle of a song, or was playing the wah backwards, just constantly at play and in the moment. I felt like I was watching him walk around alone in his apartment, but at the same time he was mid-set with Siouxsie and them. Somehow his whimsy didn’t come off as a mockery of all the brood around him, but in contrast added dimension to it. A bit of a white clown. I liked that." Klein left the Banshees before the rehearsals of the Rapture tour in late 1994.

== Other collaborations (1990s–present) ==
Klein recorded with a wide array of other artists including Talvin Singh, Baron Puppett, Thomas Dolby, Shriekback, Lucia and Space Tribe. He recorded in early 1992 with the band Shriekback for their album Sacred City, on which he is credited as John Kline. He also performed live as lead guitarist for Sinéad O'Connor during her 1995 tour, with stops at several festivals, including Pinkpop in the Netherlands, Glastonbury in England, and the Lollapalooza tour in the US. For Singh, he played guitars on Mercury Music Prize album, OK which was released in 1998.

In the late 90s he started a production Ground Control, with mixing and mastering engineer Patrick Bird. Ground Control worked with a great many artists including Cubanate, David Devant and his Spirit Wife and the LA rap artist T Love. During this period Klein started the band SNAIL with bassist Matthew Seligman and drummer Chris Bell, performing at the 1st Shanghai international Carnival in 2002. He subsequently became musical director for Dr Penguin’s Magic Circus and toured in South East Asia. In 2004, he returned to Art School to complete a degree in Fine Art and Critical Theory. He then expanded activities to include working with theatre and film companies creating soundtracks, including a three-hour immersive soundtrack for the Gastrophonic event held at the NASA museum during the TEDMED conference in 2013. Meanwhile Klein continued song writing and production, working on music with Patrina Morris, featuring Brian Jackson of Gil Scott-Heron fame and co-produced an album for Spanish band Fangoria in 2016, which went to number one on the Spanish albums chart.

Jon Klein studied at Sir John Cass College of Art, now School of Art, Architecture and Design (London Metropolitan University), focusing on Time-based media. Klein still works as a fine artist exhibiting internationally as a member of the art group DMK, and in collaboration with artist Liane Lang. He has also worked as a filmmaker for ECO TV Japan, NHK Japan, Dolce & Gabbana and Cogitanz.

Klein is a key member of the Tuned In community music project in London working with Anthony Hopkins and Jah Wobble. Between 2019 and 2021 Klein played guitar on two tracks as a guest with the charity super group Spammed, featuring Neil Innes, Rat Scabies Horace Panter, Kevin Eldon, Terry Edwards, Micko Westmorland and producers Tony Visconti and Nick Lowe.

In 2020 he was a member of the Micko and the Mellotronics, and also co-produced and co-arranged the album ½ dove – ½ pigeon. In 2021 he co-produced Metal Box Rebuilt in Dub with Jah Wobble: in 2023, he went on tour with Wobble. A second album with Wobble, A Brief History Of Now, was released in. August 2023, on the Cleopatra Records label
