= List of record labels from Bristol =

The English city of Bristol has, since the mid-1970s, had a fertile music culture, resulting in not only influential musicians and bands, but also its own sound, Bristol sound or trip hop. Along with the music, a number of local record labels also developed, some receiving national and international attention, others with a smaller audience appeal. In the 1970s, there was a DIY culture of record production and the independent record label came to prominence. One of the most successful at that time was Virgin Records started in 1972. Chiswick Records, Stiff Records, Rough Trade Records and Factory Records followed. By the later part of the decade, Virgin had become a part of the music business establishment, and new independent record labels began appearing in virtually every British town and city: Bristol was no exception.

One of the first Bristol punk bands, The Cortinas released its first single on Miles Copeland's Step Forward Records in 1977, eventually moving on to CBS before disbanding. Copeland also released, in 1977, The Pigs' "Youthanasia EP" on his newly formed New Bristol Records. The explosion in punk/new wave bands forming in the area did not attract interest from the major London-based record labels, so local labels sprung up to release recordings from these groups. Amongst the first, and initially more successful, were Heartbeat Records, Fried Egg Records, Recreational Records and Riot City Records (a Heartbeat subsidiary). Others with more modest success were Wavelength Records (although its subsidiary Bristol Recorder, did achieve some popularity), Circle Records and Sheep Worrying. Some bands set up their own labels: Black Roots (Nubian Records) and Essential Bop (Monopause Records). Yet other labels, although not based in Bristol, had a strong representation of bands from the area: Y Records, Rialto Records and Naïve Records.

After the initial burst of activity in the post-punk/new wave era, most of the labels folded (although Heartbeat, or one of its subsidiaries, still brings out the occasional release). Riot City came under the influence of EMI after it signed Vice Squad, and last released a record in 1988. Meanwhile, The Blue Aeroplanes released their first LP on Party Records in 1984, and there was some short-lived output from Children of the Revolution Records (COR), until a new generation of record labels was spawned from the trip hop movement. Exceptions to this were the rock label Sugar Shack Records, the indie pop of Sarah Records and the C86 sounds of The Subway Organization.

There are still a number of record labels operating in Bristol, but it is ironic that one of the most prolific is Bristol Archive Records, which specializes in unreleased tracks and re-releasing recordings (mainly for download) from the punk/new wave era of Bristol record labels, 1977–1981, and later.

Listed below are a number of Bristol (and surrounding areas, including North Somerset, Bath & North East Somerset, Western Wiltshire, and South Gloucestershire) record labels that, due to their short lifespan, few releases or poor distribution, may have received limited national or international attention:.

== 0–9 ==
- 3tone Records: Launched in 2016 by live productions partners Dean Roberts and Christoffer Borud, having previously worked with notable artists such as John Newman, Amy Winehouse, Jason Derulo, Echo and the Bunnymen and Queens of the Stone Age.
- 3D Records: The own label of the Bath band Neon formed by Rob Fisher and Pete Byrne in 1979. It issued their first single "Making Waves/Me I See in You" in October 1980. The duo later found success with EMI as Naked Eyes.

== A ==
- Amon Ra Records: Classical label of parent Saydisc, based in Badminton, Gloucestershire. “Amon Ra pioneered the recording of authentic performances on original instruments from the late 1970s and has built up a catalogue and reputation for quality and innovation in this field.”

== B ==
- Barrow Road Records: Barrow Road Records was established in 2012 to release Patchy's debut album "Barrow Road". The name is taken from the road on which the offices are situated on and the road sign also features as the album cover for the band's release.
- Bicycle Records: Record label formed by Jane Taylor a Bristol-based guitarist, pianist, songwriter and vocalist. It is distributed by Pinnacle. Taylor won the UK and International Songwriting Competition in 2003 with her song "Blowing This Candle Out".
- Breakfast Records: An independent publishing label established in 2016 specialising in releasing punk, indie and folk records.
- Bristol Archive Records: Subsidiary of Sugar Shack Records, set up in 2008 and specializing in unreleased tracks and re-releasing recordings (mainly for download) by Bristol bands such as Creature Beat, from 1976 onwards. According to Mike Darby, the label owner, “Bristol Archive Records was officially launched this year 2008 as a vehicle to talk about and remember Bristol's forgotten stars, those people that should have, could have or probably had no chance of fame and Global domination, but had a go, made some great music, went to the gigs, helped make the records, bought the records or just had great fun growing up in this ace city of ours.”
- Bristol Beat: Released a cassette tape of Bristol Bands playing live at the Stonehouse.
- Bristol Recorder: Innovative subsidiary label of Wavelength Records, that produced three issues of a combination LP/magazine, before folding. Bristol Recorder 1 included live tracks from Electric Guitars, Circus Circus, Various Artists and Joe Public. Recorder 2 had live tracks from Peter Gabriel (including "Ain't That Peculiar"), Fish Food, The Radicals, The X-Certs and The Welders (otherwise known as The Korgis). Recorder 3 had tracks from P.B. Davies (of Crystal Theatre/Shoes For Industry), Essential Bop, Robert Fripp, Ekome Dance Company, and Thompson Twins.

Cat No.	Artist	Title	Date	Configuration
BR 001	Various	Bristol Recorder 1	1980	LP/Magazine
BR 002	Various	Bristol Recorder 2	1981	LP/Magazine
BR 003	Various	Bristol Recorder 3	1981	LP/Magazine

== C ==
- Circus Records: Commercial label (distributed by Pinnacle) that produced six singles and a compilation LP in 1981, before closing. The LP, The Circus Comes To Town (TENT 0001), included tracks from Rimshots, Black Roots, Treatment, Alarm Clox, Gold, Riz Wah Wah, Steve Booton & Pat Jones, The Dangerous Brothers, Forty Blue Fingers, Info-Mania, Kevin McFadden, and The Bite.

Cat No.	Artist	Title	Date	Configuration
CIRC 0001	Bohana Mouse Band	F/Seven C's	1981	12” single
CIRC 0002	The Source	Like a Child/?	1981	7” single
CIRC 0003	The Stingrays	Never do/Satellites	1981	7” single
CIRC 0004	Bendall's Box	Nightmares/Games Today	1981	7” single
CIRC 0005	Sky High	Ghettos of your own kind/Part 2	1981	7” single
CIRC 0006	Slim Bridges And The Wildflowers	Rocking Goose/Mole At The Circus	1981	7” single
TENT 0001	Various	The Circus Comes To Town	1981	LP

- Clean Cut Records: See Bronnt Industries Kapital.
- Children of the Revolution Records: More often known as COR, was a label specializing in punk, hardcore and thrash.
- Cup of Tea Records: See Monk & Canatella.
- Circus City: Established in 2013 Circus City operate as a fully established record label and publishing company.

== D ==
- Death or Glory (Promotions) Label launched in 2011. Releases to date- Criminal Mind "Debut Album" (CD only) + "Life To Defend" (CD + Vinyl), Radio Nasties "EP's 1 + 2" (Ltd editions of 250, Vinyl Only) Blatoidea "Infected" Album(CD only) (released by a conglomerate of labels), Pussycat and the Dirty Johnsons "Dirty Rock 'n' Roll" (Vinyl only Ltd edition of 300), Dukes Of Bordello "Lowdown 'n' Dirty", (CD only),Charlie Harper "Harpers Way" (Ltd 300 Vinyl + 500 CD), Butcher Baby "Butcher Baby", (CD only) with Charlies Big Ray Gun Records + Shout Out Records.
- Disciple Records: British-American Bass music, Dubstep, and Riddim record label.
- Disorder Records: The hardcore noise band Disorder launched their own label in 1981 with Heartbeat Records boss Simon Edwards, after Riot City Records declined to sign them. Over a period of 3 years they released three 7-inch EP's and one 12-inch EP, before moving on to local anarchist label Children of the Revolution Records. A final 12-inch EP, The Singles Collection, was released in 1984.

== F ==
- Flightcase Recordings: Founded in 2008, Flightcase is a small independent label currently looking after the catalogue and new releases of the Bristol dance/DnB troupe and producer Dr Meaker. The first long player release was the album A Lesson From The Speaker. The label has gained exposure via Radio 1, 1xtra, 6Music and XFM, as well as print articles in Clash, Venue, Knowledge, Word magazine and others. Flightcase is distributed by Absolute Marketing and Distribution (AMD) and is run from the Easton area of Bristol.
- FMR - Forbidden Musical Rites: See Website.
- Float Records: See Bronnt Industries Kapital.
- Fried Egg Records: Founded in 1979 by Andy Leighton, administrator of the Bristol-based Crystal Theatre. The initial release was a single by the Theatres band Shoes For Industry, and in its short lifespan it did produce records by several other notable Bristol groups: Art Objects (later to metamorphose into The Blue Aeroplanes), Electric Guitars (later signed, then dumped, by Stiff Records), The Fans (apparently still gigging in Japan), The Stingrays (now gigging out of Wales) and Various Artists (who were also part of Art Objects).
- FSA Records: Set up in 1992 by Heartbeat Productions for the recently formed Bristol band Flying Saucer Attack. Their first single in 1992 had several limited editions, each with part home made sleeves of differing designs. The first album in 1993 was self-titled, but is sometimes referred to as "Rural Psychedelia". After their third single in 1994 the band joined Domino Records, however, in 1999 they returned to FSA Records issuing the LP "Mirror", before finally disbanding.
- Full Cycle Recordings: Set up in 1993 and run by Daniel Kausman (DJ Die), Paul Southey (DJ Suv), Keith Thompson (DJ Krust) and Ryan Williams (Roni Size) since 1993, they specialize in drum and bass.

== G ==
- Glasstone Records: See Evita.
- Green Goat Productions: Taking its name from the Green Goat Café (an old family business) the label currently produces material by Steve Bush (ex-Essential Bop) and Fran Fey. Its first CD Row of Ashes was released in 2008.
- Ghetto Funk Records
- GhostOfRecords

== H ==
- Heartbeat Productions: Is the parent of Heartbeat Records, Riot City Records, Disorder Records, FSA Records and Trash City Records. Initially Simon Edwards set up Heartbeat Records in 1978, however over time subsidiary labels were added to cater for different musical styles and bands, all the labels are now grouped under Heartbeat Productions.
- Heartbeat Records: Started in 1978 as a partnership of local musician Simon Edwards and Tony Dodd of Tony's Record Shop. Simon Edwards recorded and produced the first single, "I don't want my heart to rule my head" by Social Security, after which Tony Dodd decided to concentrate on his shop and Simon Edwards took over sole control. The labels' third release was the 12-inch EP, "This Is Your Life", from the influential Glaxo Babies. A number of other singles were released, however to accommodate the large number of bands around at the time they brought out the seminal "Avon Calling" – The Bristol Compilation LP. Four further LPs were released: 2 by the Glaxo Babies, The Transmitters and Art Objects (later to form the nucleus of The Blue Aeroplanes) before the label became inactive in 1984. It was revived with the 1997 album release of a 1967 radio recording by American 60's psych band The Electric Prunes. Cherry Red in recent years has repackaged tracks and albums from the Heartbeat back catalogue, including previously unreleased songs from the Glaxo Babies, Art Objects and The X-Certs.
- Hope Recordings: Started in 1998 by Leon Alexander and Steve Satterthwaite, the label is run by Leon Alexander, with DJ and record producer Nick Warren head of A&R. Its progressive house and breaks artists include: Starecase, Jaytech, Matt Rowan, and Parallel Sound. It is home to progressive house and breaks artists such as Starecase, Jaytech, Matt Rowan and Parallel Sound.
- Household Records: Own label of The Chesterfields on which they released three singles and an album, before the band split in 1989.

== L ==
- Label7: An Electronic Music label that has released tracks from live breaks & techno dance act Bosch Stacey.

== M ==
- Monopause Records: This was Essential Bop's own record label, having previously had the track "Chronicle" on the LP Avon Calling. There were two releases, both in resealable plastic bags with folded picture sleeves and lyrics printed inside, and distributed by Bristols’ Revolver Records. The second single received airplay in New York, resulting in the band touring and recording there in 1981. The band subsequently released two tracks on the Bristol Recorder 3, an LP on TSAR Records and a downloadable album on Bristol Archive Records.

Cat No.	Artist	Title	Date	Configuration
Moan 1001	Essential Bop	Raider's Blues/Eloquent Sounds/Failsafe/Mandarin Whores (live)	1980	7” EP
Moan 1002	Essential Bop	Croaked/Butler (in running shorts)	1981	7” single

- More Rockers: Label set up by Smith & Mighty, which released their 1995 album Bass Is Maternal.

== N ==
- New Bristol Records: In 1977, Miles Copeland helped to set up a number of labels to ride the current punk/new wave. Bristols’ The Cortinas had already signed to Step Forward Records and New Bristol was another of his labels. As the label's first band, The Pigs put it, "August 12th at Sound Conception 4-track studio. It's been about 20 weeks since we formed, we’ve written maybe 12 songs and played 6 or so gigs. Now we're recording our whole set. As it turns out, most of this stuff won't see the light of day for 30 years. Copeland chooses the four tracks for the EP that's going to launch a new Bristol record label. They call it New Bristol Records. Yeah.” The label appears to have had only two releases, by The Pigs and Gardez Darkx.

Cat No.	Artist	Title	Date	Configuration
NBR 01	The Pigs	Youthanasia/They Say/Psychopath/National Front	1977	7” EP
NBR 02	Gardez Darkx	Freeze (In the U.L.zone)/Heartbeat	1978	7” single

- Nightcap Records: Independent student-run music production label that teams with artists from all genres and aims to nurture them into a world of music.
- Not Very Nice Records: Initially a subsidiary of Riot City Records, the first release was the 1985 spoof NOW! album, "NOW! That's What I Call A Fuckin' Racket (Vol 1)" (GRR 1), by Chaotic Dischord. Chaotic Dischord went on to release 2 other albums on the label.
- NP Records: Independent family run label that has released a 4 track EP by Manchester quartet, Coraline.
- Nubian Records: See Black Roots.

== P ==
- Party Records: Released The Blue Aeroplanes first album Bop Art in 1984 and distributed by The Cartel.
- Pop God released some absolutely wonderful records by the Moonflowers, Me and Praise Space Electric, amongst others.

== R ==
- The Record Press: An imprint of Bristol Folk Publications dedicated to publishing British record label discographies; has also released a CD to tie in with a book on Transacord, which includes nothing but recordings of steam engines. More CD releases are planned.
- Recreational Records: The label was started in 1981 by the Bristol record shop and distributor Revolver Records, with its own distribution as part of the Cartel. Amongst their artists were, Talisman a multi-racial Reggae Band who provided the labels second single and first UK Indie Chart hit (#17). Dole Age also became Single of the Week and the 1981 Record Sleeve of the Year in the NME. Nine singles were released in total, including "Work/Don't Wake The Baby" by Electric Guitars.
- Resurrection Records: Short-lived label that released the first single by punk band Lunatic Fringe in 1981.
- Riot City Records: Set up in 1980 by Simon Edwards of Heartbeat Productions along with Dave Bateman and Shane Baldwin from the band Vice Squad, and distributed by the Cartel. Vice Squad's Last Rockers EP was Riot City's first release and Indie Hit, selling 22,000 copies. In its relative short lifespan the label had over 40 releases, selling nearly 250,000 records and was one of the prominent exponents of British punk music, regularly having hits in the UK Indie Chart.
- Riot State Records: Subsidiary of Riot City Records that in 1982 released an American punk compilation album, "Hell comes to your House" (Reagan 1), licensed from Bemisbrain Records USA.

== S ==
- Sarah Records: Formed by Clare Wadd and Matt Haynes and active between 1987 and 1995, it is best known for its recordings of twee pop. Haynes subsequently established Shinkansen Recordings in London, where many Sarah artists went on to record.
- Saydisc Records: Founded in 1965, and based in Badminton, Gloucestershire, Saydisc has developed a wide range of releases from traditional, world, period, exotic and unusual recordings, through to folk and meditative. It also has produced a number of local dialect and spoken word recordings. It is the parent of classical label Amon Ra and the folk label The Village Thing. Saydisc and Village Thing are covered in two books by the award-nominated Bristolian author, Mark Jones:
  - Bristol Folk provides a discographical history of many of the artists that recorded for Saydisc and Village Thing and also includes a partial history of the labels.
  - The Saydisc & Village Thing Discography includes the most comprehensive available discographies for Saydisc, Amon Ra, Village Thing and other related labels, such as Matchbox and Matchbox Bluesmaster. The book includes pictures of all available sleeves plus all known label designs and it is rounded off with a history of Saydisc and Village Thing.
- Sheep Worrying: This label grew out of the Bridgewater-based magazine and entertainments promoter, Sheep Worrying, founded by Brian Smedley. It released the single "False Nose/County Councillor"(1980) and two tape albums, Internal Organs (1978), and Going Shopping (1980) by The Dangerous Brothers.
- Shoc Wave Records: Shoc-Wave was based in Easton, Bristol, and run by Gene Walsh. It specialized in Dominican music and Jamaican reggae bands such as Joshua Moses and Buggs Durrant, but also released records from a variety of other genres including dub, disco and ska. In 1980, it released the single "“I Was Wrong / Stuck in a Boat" (SRP0007) by The Rimshots, five middle class white kids from Bristols’ northern suburbs playing two-tone styled ska.
- Silent Age Records: See Gravenhurst.
- Shabby Cabin Records: Based on the outskirts of Bristol, specializes in folk music.
- Sink and Stove Records: Set up by Benjamin Shillabeer and Stuart Bell in 1998 to release their own conceptual album 'The Fall Project' followed by a compilation of tracks by bands/musicians they knew. A number of the bands who originally released albums on S&S later re-released material on other labels, including: Chikinki and Gravenhurst.
- smallPRINT Records: Label set up by Tim Kirby that specialises in hip hop, folk, electronica, musique concrete, left field, and avant rock.
- The Subway Organization: Founded in 1985 by Martin Whitehead of The Flatmates. The label was associated with the Indie Pop movement and the seminal NME cassette tape C86, that included the track It's Up To You by the Shop Assistants, from the labels first release. Other artists included: The Chesterfields, Pop Will Eat Itself, Razorcuts and The Soup Dragons.
- Sugar Shack Records: Set up in 1985 by Mike Darby, a veteran of the Bristol Music Scene. Rock influenced label with releases by Redefine, Left Side Brain and Midasuno, Its subsidiary label Bristol Archive Records is dedicated to re-releasing music and unreleased material from the Bristol area, mainly in downloadable format.
- Swarf Finger Records: Bristol based label that has released recordings by Crescent, Experimental Pop Band, and The Blue Aeroplanes.

== T ==
- The Record Press: An imprint of Bristol Folk Publications that concentrates on publishing record label discographies (including one on Bristolian labels, Saydisc and Village Thing), one of which included a CD of railway sounds.
- Three Stripe Records: Released the ‘Stepper's Delight’ (1992) and ‘Remember Me’ EPs by Smith & Mighty.
- Trash City Records: Trash City was primarily set up by Heartbeat Productions in 1994 to issue 7-inch singles by US garage bands. It only released one record in its first year and in wasn't until 1996 and the signing of UK band Headcase, that the label issued another record. Three more singles and two albums were to eventually follow.
- Tribe Recordings: See Danny Byrd.

== V ==
- The Village Thing: Folk music subsidiary of Saydisc that operated between 1970 and 1973. Records were pressed in relatively small numbers, although "The Folker" by Fred Wedlock did go onto sell around 20,000 copies.
- Volatile Records: Own label of Post Punk/Goth band The Escape, run in conjunction with Dave Massey out of his flat in the St. Andrews area of Bristol, releasing one single in 1982 "No Go/I'll Pretend To Kill You", before signing with Phonogram/Mercury Records.

== W ==
- Wavelength Records: The label was set up by the drummer Thomas Brooman (along with Bob Hooton) to release a single by his Bristol big band, The Spics. It subsequently released three further singles by Gardez Darkx, Joe Public (another Brooman band) and Color Tapes before reinventing itself in 1980 as a combination magazine/record called The Bristol Recorder, which ran for three issues.

Cat No.	Artist	Title	Date	Configuration
HURT 001	The Spics	You and Me/Bus Stop	1979	7” single
HURT 002	Gardez Darkx	Bliss/Winter Scene	1979	7” single
HURT 003	Joe Public	Hermans Back/Travelling With Raymond/Like It	1979	7” single
HURT 004	Color Tapes	Cold Anger/Leaves of China	1979	7” single
BR 001	Various	Bristol Recorder 1	1980	LP/Magazine
BR 002	Various	Bristol Recorder 2	1981	LP/Magazine
BR 003	Various	Bristol Recorder 3	1981	LP/Magazine

- West Peto Records: West Peto Records was set up in the Spring of 2015 and is run by Luke Smith. West Peto Records is based in Bradford-On-Avon, Wiltshire. The label is a Rock/Pop genre label and includes artists: The Cheap Thrills, Chey Naish, Georgie Biggin and Selian's Daydream. The first single to be released on the label was Selian's Dream - Music Comes First (WPR0001) on June 8, 2015.
- The Western Star Recording Company: Specializing in Rockabilly, Psychobilly and 50's/60's Britpop-styled music, it has been owned and run by record producer and musician Alan Wilson since 2003.
- WYKA HYPE : Independent Urban label Established 2018. Currently includes artist and producers 'Jay J Hype, Seanibwoi & 3L3V3N:3L3V3N'

== Y ==
- Y Records: Set up in 1980 by Dick O'Dell and distributed by Rough Trade. Although not a Bristol-based label, it did release a significant number of records by bands from the Bristol area, including: The Pop Group, Glaxo Babies, Maximum Joy, and Pigbag.

== See also ==
- List of independent UK record labels
- List of record labels
- List of Bands from Bristol
- Culture of Bristol
