= Fried Egg Records =

British record label

- Cover of The Best of Fried Egg Records (Bristol 1979–1980)
- Founded: 1979
- Founder: Andy Leighton
- Defunct: 1980
- Distributor: Spartan
- Genre: New wave, post-punk
- Country of origin: United Kingdom
- Location: Bristol
- Official website: Fried Egg Records at Bristol Archive Records

Fried Egg Records was a record label set up in 1979 by Andy Leighton, administrator of the Bristol-based Crystal Theatre. Its first release was by the Theatres anarchic "house band" Shoes For Industry. In its short two-year existence the label did manage to produce records from some of Bristols' more notable bands, plus a compilation LP, E(gg)clectic 1.

== Artists ==
- Art Objects: New wave "art band" (1978–1981). Fronted by Bristol beat poet Gerard Langley, brother John Langley on drums, dancer Wojtek Dmochowski (all later of Blue Aeroplanes), Bill Stair, and brothers Jonjo and Robin Key (both simultaneously in the band Various Artists). After their Fried Egg single, they released another single and the album Bagpipe Music on Heartbeat Records.
- Various Artists: Pop band fronted by Jonjo Key, brother Robin Key, bassist Christian Clarke and drummer John Langley. Released a track on Avon Calling, a Fried Egg single and the 'Solo Album' LP (VA 1) on their own label (this was later released in Japan on CD in 2002). Jon Jo and Robin later became Either/Or and released a single in the Netherlands before signing to Virgin Records as Lovetrain and releasing an LP and three singles. According to Andy Leighton of Fried Egg, "...we got Trevor Horn...to see Various Artists for the second time, he wanted to sign them and record them. ... the dream remained for a breakout band, unfortunately Jon Jo ... turned Trevor Horn's overtures down and the main chance was gone."
- Pete Brandt's Method: Large jazz-funk band, this was their only single. Pete Brandt is now producing melodic acoustic folk.
- Electric Guitars: Esoteric pop/funk band (1979–1983). After initially recording singles for Fried Egg and Recreational Records and contributing live tracks to the first edition of The Bristol Recorder, the band was signed to and then dumped by Stiff Records. They released a total of 5 singles and two post-break-up albums.
- Exploding Seagulls: Manic guitar-based band from Hampshire. Nick Jacobs (guitarist) joined up with ex-members of Art Objects to form The Blue Aeroplanes.
- The Fans: Guitar band formed in 1978 in Bristol, England. Consisting of George Smith, Barry Cook, Tony Bird and Rob Williams, their first release was an EP with 'Giving Me That Look in Your Eyes/Stay The Night' and a version of Jim Reeves' song 'He'll Have to Go'. A second single in 1980 was 'You Don't Live Here Anymore/Following You', the band then split up. Japanese indie label 1977 Records picked up the Fans singles and re-released them in 2001. A CD album containing the singles, demos and live recordings from a Bristol gig was released on 1977 Records in 2004. Japanese metal/punk band Brahman recorded a version of 'You Don't Live Here Anymore' in 2008 and The Fans have reformed to tour Japan in 2010.
- Shoes for Industry: Crystal Theatres' anarchic "house band". Fried Egg Records was formed to release their two singles, and an album called 'Talk Like A Whelk'. Their singer P. B. Davies provided the 'Ideas Are Animals' quintet of tracks on Bristol Recorder 3, he also performs at the Edinburgh Fringe and writes for radio.
- The Stingrays: New wave band (1977–current). The first single was on Fried Egg; the second was on Circus Records; they also contributed a track to the LP Avon Calling. The band are still gigging but out of Wales now.
- The Untouchables: Youthful R&B band in the Dr. Feelgood model, so much so that Wilko Johnson produced their single for Fried Egg. Post-break-up, the vocalist Jerry Tremaine was filmed by Julien Temple singing with the original Feelgood line-up at Southend on 9 May 2008, as part of the annual Lee Brilleaux memorial.
- The Viceroys: Rock band including Nick Sheppard and Mike Crawford; their only release was 'Angels in the Rain' on the Fried Egg World Tour EP, sold exclusively at gigs. Another Sheppard and Crawford band, The Spics, went on to play 'Angels in the Rain' at their very last appearance, on the BBC West TV arts show RPM.
- Wild Beasts: R&B band, only released one single. Bassist and vocalist Andy Franks became a Tour Manager for Depeche Mode, and drummer Ken Wheeler became a producer and ran Sound Conception recording studios.

== Releases ==
=== Singles ===
Cat No.	Artist	Title	Date	Configuration
EGG 001	Shoes For Industry	"Falling in Love Again" / "Laughing Song"	1979	
EGG 002	Wild Beasts	"Minimum Maximum" / "Another Man"	1979	7'’
EGG 003	The Fans	"Giving Me That Look in Your Eyes" / "Stay The Night" / "He'll Have to Go"	1979	7'’ EP
EGG 004	Shoes For Industry	"Spend" / "Sheepdog Trial Inna Babylon"	1980	7'’
EGG 005	Pete Brandt's Method	"What You Are" / "Positive Thinking"	1980	7'’
EGG 006	The Stingrays	"Countdown" / "Exceptions" / "Action"	1980	7'’
EGG 007	Art Objects	"Hard Objects" / "Bibliotheque" / "Fit of Pique"	1980	7'’
EGG 008	Exploding Seagulls	"Johnny Runs For Paregoric" / "Take Me to the Cinema"	1980	7'’
EGG 009	Various Artists	"Original Mixed Up Kid" / "Unofficial Secrets"	1980	7'’
EGG 010	The Fans	"You Don't Live Here Anymore" / "Following You"	1980	7'’
EGG 011	The Untouchables	"Keep on Walking" / "Keep Your Distance"	1980	7'’
EGG 012	Electric Guitars	"Health" / "Continental Shelf"	1980	7"

=== EP (EAT 001, Fried Egg World Tour 1980) ===
1. The Viceroys – "Angels in the Rain"
2. Shoes For Industry – "Sheepdog Trial Inna Babylon"
3. The Stingrays – "Countdown"
4. Exploding Seagulls – "Johnny Runs For Paregoric"
5. Various Artists – "Original Mixed Up Kid"

=== Albums ===
Cat No.	Artist	Title	Date
FRY 001	Shoes For Industry	Talk Like A Whelk	1979
FRY 002	Various	E(gg)clectic 1	1980

=== Reissues on other labels ===
Bristol Archive Records are currently providing Fried Egg back catalogue tracks for download through the usual outlets (Amazon, iTunes, etc.). In February 2010, they released a CD of The Best of Fried Egg Records (Bristol 1979–1980), which consists of the LP E(gg)clectic 1 (FRY 002) plus eight additional tracks.

==== The Best of Fried Egg Records (Bristol 1979–1980) ====
1. Shoes For Industry – "Jerusalem"
2. Pete Brandt's Method – "Positive Thinking"
3. Art Objects – "Hard Objects"
4. Exploding Seagulls – "Johnny Runs For Paregoric"
5. The Wild Beasts – "Minimum Maximum"
6. Shoes For Industry – "Invasion of the French Boyfriends"
7. Various Artists – "Original Mixed Up Kid"
8. The Fans – "Following You"
9. The Stingrays – "Exceptions"
10. Various Artists – "Unofficial Secrets"
11. The Untouchables – "Keep on Walking"
12. Electric Guitars – "Continental Shelf"
13. The Fans – "Giving Me That Look in Your Eye" (Additional Track)
14. The Stingrays – "Countdown" (Additional Track)
15. Art Objects – "Fit of Pique" (Additional Track)
16. Electric Guitars – "Health" (Additional Track)
17. The Viceroys – "Angels in the Rain" (Demo/Additional Track)
18. Various Artists – "Stephens Body" (Additional Track)
19. Electric Guitars – "Work" (Demo/Additional Track)
20. Shoes For Industry – "Sheepdog Trial Inna Babylon" (Additional Track)

== See also ==
- List of record labels
- List of record labels from Bristol
- List of bands from Bristol
