= The Stingrays (Bristol band) =

British new wave musical group

- Origin: Bristol, England
- Genres: New wave
- Years active: 1977–present
- Labels: Fried Egg; Circus
- Members: Russ Mainwaring; Richard H. Meredith
- Past members: Bill Stair, Pete Thelke, Dean Sidney, Chris Bostock, Sean McLuskey, Paul Johnson, Mark Paton, Duncan Stringer, Marc Raygun
- Website: The Stingrays Facebook Page

The Stingrays are a British new wave band, which was originally formed in 1977 in Bristol, England, by Welsh musician Russ Mainwaring and Dean Sidney and are still gigging today. (There are at least three notable bands that have called themselves The Stingrays, Sting Rays or a permutation of the name). They have experienced various line up changes over the years, but have included: Russ Mainwaring (who is still a member), Bill Stair (Art Objects, Various Artists, Blue Aeroplanes), Chris Bostock, Sean McLuskey (Subway Sect, JoBoxers, If?) and Paul Johnson (Massive Attack).

Their first single, Countdown, was released on local label Fried Egg Records in 1980. They also contributed the track, "Sound", to the seminal Heartbeat Records compilation album, Avon Calling.

The mini-album, The Stingrays At the Dugout in '77: The Sound of Two Hands Clapping, was recorded by Simon Edwards (of Heartbeat Records) live at the Dug Out Club, Park Row, Bristol. According to Steve Bush of Essential Bop, they were "a bit like Bristol's equivalent of The Ramones. A rockin' unit with an advanced sense of irony."

In 2002 "Countdown" was re-released on the 1977 Records label in Japan

A CD of previously unavailable tracks, Back across the Rubicon was released on in 2009.

2010 saw Japanese manga artist Zawa Freakbeat using The Stingrays gig at The Star Lounge in Tokyo as a theme in his manga Private World Volume 2

In 2011 an EP "The Girl in the Greengrocers" was released in Japan

In 2012 a limited edition vinyl release of Countdown was released in Japan

In 2017 an album Ticket from Home recorded in Osaka Japan was released

In 2019 an EP Kreuzberg was released. Recorded in Berlin, it was produced by Matt Dangerfield of The Boys.

== Discography ==
Cover of their first single, "Countdown"

=== Singles ===
- "Countdown" / "Exceptions" / "Actions" (1979, Fried Egg, UK, 7", EGG 006)
- "Countdown" / "Exceptions" / "Actions" (2002, 1977 Records, Japan, 7", 1977-S025)
- "Never Do" / "Satellites" (1981, Circus, UK, 7", CIRC 0003)
- "Different Life" / "All I know" (2017, Stingrays, UK, 7", Stingrays002)
- "Fashion Street" / "Voice of the People" / "Searchout" (2019, Stingrays, UK, 7", Stingrays006)

=== Albums ===
- The Stingrays at the Dugout in '77: The Sound of Two Hands Clapping (2009, Bristol Archive, Mini Album Download, ARC077)
- Back Across the Rubicon (2009, YTY, UK, CD) retrospective compilation
- Ticket from Home (2017 CD, Stingrays004)
- Ticket from Home (2017 Vinyl, Stingrays003)

=== Tracks appear on ===
- Bristol Beat: The Stonehouse Tapes 8-3-80 / 15-3-80 (1980, Bristol Beat, UK, Cassette)
- Avon Calling (1980, Heartbeat, UK, LP, HB 1)
