= Electric Guitars =

English band

Background information
- Origin: Bristol, England
- Genres: Post-punk, funk
- Years active: 1980–1983
- Labels: Fried Egg; Bristol Recorder; Recreational; Stiff; Naive; Bristol Archive
- Past members: Neil Davenport; Richard Hall; Andy Sanders; Matt Salt; Dick Truscott; Sarah & Wendy Partridge
- Website: Electric Guitars at Bristol Archive Records

Electric Guitars were an English band formed early in 1980 by Neil Davenport (vocals, lyrics) and Richard Hall (bass, vocals) who were both studying English at Bristol University. The band soon increased to a five-man line-up, with Andy Sanders (guitar, vocals), Matt Salt (drums) and Dick Truscott (keyboards), they also later added two backing singers: Sarah and Wendy Patridge. Their first single "Health" / "Continental Shelf" was released on local label Fried Egg Records in 1980.

They contributed four live tracks to the first edition of The Bristol Recorder in 1980, and in 1981 released their second single "Work" / "Don’t Wake the Baby" on Recreational Records, which reached No. 45 on the UK Indie Chart. They toured as support to The Thompson Twins, which brought them to the attention of Stiff Records, who promptly signed them up. The band's first single for Stiff was "Language Problems" in 1982, and this was followed by an EP in the same year, from which Toni Basil recorded "Beat Me Hollow" for her TV special. Bert Muirhead in his 1982 book about Stiff Records, said about the band, "The combination of Stiff, Martin Rushent and Worldchief Management (OMITD etc) seems unstoppable. They will undoubtedly be very big in the mid 1980s". However, after the "Wolfman Tap" single on Naive Records, they disbanded in August 1983.

== Trivia ==
The band sang and performed in a Japanese advert for Royal Dutch Shell, called Shell, We Shall.

Sarah and Wendy Partridge went on to sing with Shriekback. The band also traveled with Peter Gabriel as his opening act during the Security tour.

== Discography ==
=== Albums ===
- Jolts (2008, Bristol Archive Records, UK, Download, ARC026)
- Electric Guitars – The Stiff Recordings (?, Stiff, UK, Download)

=== Singles ===
- "Health" / "Continental Shelf" (1980, Fried Egg, UK, 7", EGG 012)
- "Work" / "Don't Wake the Baby" (1981, Recreational, UK, 7", SPORT 4)
- "Language Problems" / "Night Bears" (1982, Stiff, UK, 7" BUY 148)
- "Language Problems" / "Night Bears" / "Ex-US Presidents" (1982, Stiff, UK, 12" BUYIT 148)
- "Language Problems" / "Night Bears" / "Ex-US Presidents" (1982, Victoria, Spain, 12", VIC-052)
- "Beat Me Hollow" / "Genghis Khan" / "My Big Surprise" / "The Cupboard" EP (1982, Stiff, UK, 12", BUYIT 161)
- "Wolfman Tap" / "Stamp Out The Termites" (1983, Naive Records, UK, 7", NAV 5)
- "Wolfman Tap" / "Stamp Out The Termites" (1983, Naive Records, UK, 12", 12 NAV 5)

=== Tracks appear on ===
- Fried Alive 1980 World Tour EP (1980, Fried Egg, EP)
- The Bristol Recorder (1980, Wavelength, UK, LP/Magazine, BR001)
- E(gg)clectic 1 (1980, Fried Egg, UK, LP, FRY 002)
- Volume 6 Program 2 (1983, Disconet Program Service, USA, 12"x2, MWDN 602)
- The Stiff Records Box Set (1992, Demon Records, UK, CDx4, STIFF BOX 1)
- Western Stars – The Bands That Built Bristol Vol. 1 (2001, Bristol Archive Records, UK, CD, ARC 001)
- The Big Stiff Box Set (2007, Salvo, UK, CDx4, SALVOBX402)
- E(gg)clectic 1 [Reissue] (2008, Bristol Archive Records, UK, Download, ARC 006)

== See also ==
- List of Bands from Bristol
- Culture of Bristol
- List of Record Labels from Bristol
