= Batcave (club) =

Nightclub in London, at Meard Street, Soho

- Interactive map of Batcave
- Address: Dean Street, Soho, London
- Coordinates: 51.5134°N 0.1326°W
- Type: Club-night
- Events: Glam rock; new wave; gothic rock; post-punk; synthpop; post-industrial; no wave; deathrock

Construction
- Opened: 21 July 1982
- Closed: 1985

The Batcave was a weekly club-night launched at 69 Dean Street in central London in 1982. It is considered to be the birthplace of the Southern English goth subculture. It lent its name to the term Batcaver, used to describe the early fans of gothic rock music, who would adorn themselves in batwing coffin necklaces to distinguish themselves from other goth clubs.

== History ==
The original Batcave ran for five months every Wednesday from 21 July 1982 at the Gargoyle Club at 69 Dean Street, Soho, moving out when the upper floors were sold off that December. Originally specialising in new wave and glam rock, it later focused on gothic rock. Olli Wisdom, the lead singer in the house band Specimen, ran the night with Specimen's guitarist Jon Klein as art director, and initially with the assistance of production manager Hugh Jones. Regulars included musicians and singers such as Nick Cave, Robert Smith of the Cure, Siouxsie Sioux, Steven Severin, the members of Bauhaus, Marc Almond and the members of Foetus. The novelist Rupert Thomson included an account of a Batcave club night in his 2010 memoir This Party's Got to Stop.

An array of bands would play live, alongside 4-hour sets from their resident DJ Hamish MacDonald, and when the club-night transferred to the former Subway club at 28 Leicester Square in February 1983, a guest DJ presided upstairs with a US Army jeep parked by the bar. (The Batcave decamped later that year to Fooberts and in 1984 to Gossip's, both in Soho). The bands involved included electronic leading act Alien Sex Fiend, the host's band Specimen who took influence from 1970s glam rock, Hamish's band Sexbeat, and Sex Gang Children, who would go on to prove influential in the gothic rock, dark cabaret and deathrock movements. At the Gargoyle, the Batcave also showed 8mm films in its old theatre and occasionally featured unusual cabaret such as Mr Swing the Fakir and mud-wrestling. Olli Wisdom told The Face: "We don't suck our cheeks, we have fun." In an interview for Mick Mercer's Gothic Rock, Jonny (Slut) Melton said of the Batcave:

It was a light bulb for all the freaks and people like myself who were from the sticks and wanted a bit more from life. Freaks, weirdos, sexual deviants ... There's people around who'll always be attracted by something shiny, glittering, exciting. At the time the Batcave wasn't a doomy, Gothy, droney grungey sort of place ... It was more Gotham City than Aleister Crowley.

== Legacy ==
The Batcave was foundational to the establishment of the gothic rock genre and goth subculture. Journalist Michael Johnson stated that the Batcave largely established goth fashion, however had a less significant impact on the development of the gothic rock music.

In 1983, a vinyl record entitled The Batcave: Young Limbs And Numb Hymns was released on the London Records label. The compilation included Specimen ("Dead Mans Autochop"), Sexbeat ("Sexbeat"), Test Dept. ("Shockwork"), Patti Palladin ("The Nuns New Clothes"), James T. Pursey ("Eyes Shine Killidiscope"), Meat of Youth ("Meat of Youth"), Brilliant ("Coming Up for the Downstroke"), Alien Sex Fiend ("R.I.P."), and The Venomettes ("The Dance of Death").

On the Mountain Goats 2017 album Goths, the first track "Rain in Soho" discusses the Batcave prominently.
