= Specimen (band) =

British band

Background information
- Origin: Bristol, England
- Genres: Gothic rock; death rock; post-punk; glam rock
- Years active: 1981–1985, 2006–present
- Labels: Sire; Metropolis
- Members: Olli Wisdom; Jon Klein; Zach Freeman; Kev Mills; Chris Bell; Johann Bley
- Past members: See below

Specimen are a British band founded in 1981. Their music has been described as spanning many different genres of music, including glam, goth, punk and post-punk, and the band is widely credited as one of the pioneers of the goth subculture, both musically and stylistically.

== Early days ==
The band was formed in 1981 in Bristol, England by vocalist Olli Wisdom with guitarists Jon Klein (from Europeans) and Kevin Mills (from the X-Certs). Their first show was at a street party celebrating the wedding of Charles, Prince of Wales and Lady Diana Spencer. In 1982, the band relocated to Soho, London, where Wisdom founded the infamous Batcave weekly club-night. Ian Astbury described the band's unique hybrid of punk and glam: "Specimen were very dark, but they were as much German as they were The Addams Family. They were like a Death Bowie."

When approached by Wisdom and asked to join Specimen, original keyboardist Jonny Slut initially declined because he could not play any instruments. Wisdom insisted and Slut eventually learned to play the keyboard by utilizing guiding stickers. Sporting what would become known as deathhawk hair, Jonny Slut proved no less photogenic than frontman Olli himself in mascara and black lace.

While the band were together, they never released a full album, only singles and a mini album. However, in 1997, two full-length compilations were released featuring various Specimen songs. In 1985, the original Specimen lineup broke up after the release of the Sharp Teeth Pretty Teeth single. Olli Wisdom moved to San Francisco, California, USA and formed a short-lived American version of Specimen.

== Post-Specimen ==
After the band went its separate ways, guitarist Jon Klein worked with Siouxsie and the Banshees for seven years, before working with Sinéad O'Connor. He was also in the British 1998 film Married 2 Malcolm in a non-speaking role.

Jonny Slut formed Diskord Datkord with Mark Tinley and Adam Tinley before going on to work with the KLF, Adamski and is now a member of Atomizer. He also founded the Nag Nag Nag club-night in London, where he was one of the house DJs.

Tim Huthert went on to join Until December, and more recently played with the re-formed Jetboy as well as recording the Electric Ballroom album with Jon Klein. He currently resides in New York.

Olli Wisdom went on to produce psychedelic trance music under the name Space Tribe.

Kevin Mills joined Flesh for Lulu.

== Specimen today ==
In July 2008, the original 1983 line up got together to perform at the Batcave's 25th anniversary event in London, resulting in the release of the live album Specimen Alive at the Batcave on Metropolis. The reunion grew directly out of friendships rekindled during the making of 2007's Electric Ballroom album, which featured T.bias, Kimba, Stephan Byron-Salit, and Tim Huthert, as well as Jon Klein collaborations with Olli Wisdom and Jonny Slut.

In February 2009, Jonny Slut and Jon Klein appeared at the Fashion Institute of Technology (New York) for the symposium 'Subculture and Style' during the exhibition for the book Gothic Dark Glamour by Valery Steele and Jennifer Parks. The exhibition featured one of Jon Klein's 25-year-old stage outfits, alongside Alexander McQueen, John Galliano and Rick Owens.

In 2010, on August 19, Specimen played in Vilnius at the Drop Dead Festival.

In May 2011, the band confirmed via Facebook that Jonny Slut had officially retired from Specimen. In December of the same year, they announced the addition of Johann Bley, ex-Juno Reactor, was to replace Slut on keyboard.

In December 2011, the band announced that they were working with producer and Killing Joke bassist Youth on a new album. The following month, they revealed its name – Wake the Dead – and launched a Pledgemusic campaign to help fund the album for release in 2013.

== Band members ==
Current members

- Jon Klein – guitar, vocals
- Johann Bley – keyboards
- Kev Mills – bass, backing vocals
- Chris Bell – drums

Former members

- Olli Wisdom – vocals (died August 2021)
- Jonny Slut – keyboards, backing vocals
- T.bias – vocals
- Kimba – bass
- Stephan Byron-Salit – guitar, backing vocals
- Tim Huthert – drums
- Jonathan Trevisick – drums
- Peter Cook – keyboards
- Danny Pepworth – drums
- George Lynch – bass, backing vocals
- Smeg – guitar
- Gere Fennelly – keyboards
- Naunton – drums
- Simeon – keyboards
- Jonny Slag – bass
- Jeff St. Pierre – drums

== Discography ==
=== Albums ===
- Electric Ballroom (2007), Metropolis Records
- Wake the Dead (2013)

=== Compilations ===
- Warm Wet Cling – Film Red Velvet Crush (1997)
- Azoic (1997)

=== Live albums ===
- Alive at the Batcave (2009), Metropolis Records/Eyeswideshut Recordings

=== Singles & EPs ===
Year	Title	UK	UK Indie	Label
1983	"Returning (from a Journey)" / "Kiss Kiss Bang Bang"	85	–	London Records
1983	"Beauty of Poison" / "Tell Tail"	81	–	London Records
1983	Batastrophe EP	–	–	London Records
1985	"Sharp Teeth, Pretty Teeth" / "Hex" / "Holes"	–	20	Trust Records
1986	"Indestructible / "Brainburst"	–	–	Rampant Records

== See also ==
- Olli Wisdom
