= Elder Island (band) =

English musical trio

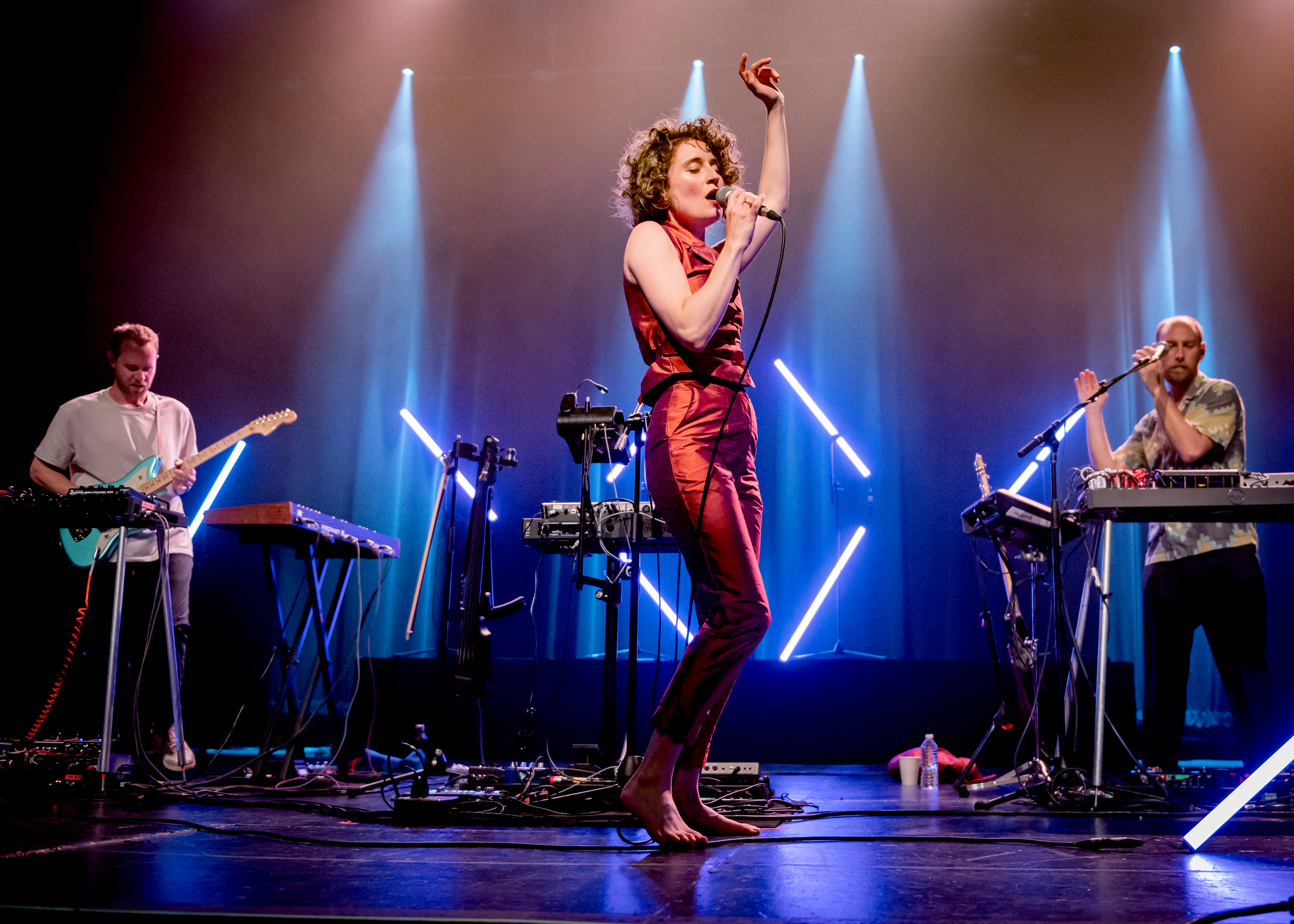
- Elder Island performing in 2022

Background information
- Origin: Bristol, England
- Genres: Folk; house; indie electronica
- Years active: 2014–present
- Members: Katy Sargent; Luke Thornton; David Havard
- Website: elderisland.com

Elder Island is an English musical trio from Bristol, formed in 2014. As of 2026, they have released three studio albums, three EPs, two remix albums, and numerous singles.

== History ==
The group was founded in 2014 under the name Trouvaille as an experimental audiovisual project. They began playing folk music and eventually progressed to house music, changing their name to Elder Island, after the Canadian island of the same name, and released an eponymous EP, which received airplay on BBC Radio 6.

The trio continued working jobs outside of the band, and in 2019, they issued their first full-length album, titled The Omnitone Collection. That year, they toured North America in support of the record.

In 2021, Elder Island published their second studio album, Swimming Static. Their third album, Hello Baby Okay, came out in May 2026.

== Band members ==
- Katy Sargent – vocals, cello
- Luke Thornton – bass, programming
- David Havard – guitar, keyboards

== Discography ==
Studio albums

- The Omnitone Collection (2019)
- Swimming Static (2021)
- Hello Baby Okay (2026)

EPs

- Elder Island (2014)
- Seeds in Sand (2016)
- Additions Attachments (2022)

Remix albums

- The Omnitone Collection Remixed (2020)
- Swimming Static Remixed (2022)

Singles

- "What It's Worth" (2014)
- "The Big Unknown" (2014)
- "Bamboo" (2016)
- "Golden" (2016)
- "Welcome State" (2017)
- "Bonfires" (2017)
- "Black Fur" (2018)
- "Don't Lose" (2018)
- "You & I" (2018)
- "I Fold You" (2018)
- "Kape Fear" (2019)
- "Vulture" (2020)

- "JPP" (2020)
- "Feral" (2020)
- "Small Plastic Heart" (2020)
- "Purely Educational" (2021)
- "Sacred" (2021)
- "Cannonball" (2021)
- "Embers" (2022)
- "Late at Night" (2022)
- "Queen of Kings" (2022)
- "Motive" (2022)
- "Ordinary Love" (2025)
