= Force Majeure (band) =

English new wave group

Background information
- Origin: Bristol, England
- Genres: New wave, dance, pop
- Instruments: Keyboards
- Years active: 1983–1986

Force Majeure was an English new wave group, formed in 1983 in Bristol. The band was formed from the German-based group, The Agents, and mixed post-punk and electronic dance music with an original line-up of two singers and two keyboard players. The line-up consisted of Agent members Richard Snow (vocals), Dave Libby (keyboards) and Steve Libby (keyboards). Kerrie Cox was added to the line-up as a second singer.

The band created a large fan base in Bristol in the early 1980s and were popular in Germany. While on tour in Germany, they were spotted at a gig in Frankfurt's nightclub, Cookies, by Ralph Ruppert, a record producer and chief sound engineer for Frank Farian, and were signed to his record label. During 1984 Snow left, and the band went through a phase of using several singers. In 1985, Welsh singer Judith Owen, recorded with them. At this time they were featured as a duo on Farian's charity record, with a cover of Paul Simon's "Mother and Child Reunion". This was issued under the name Frank Farian Corporation feat. Reggie Tsiboe, which later got shorten to Far Corporation. The record reached the Top 10 in several European countries. Owen left to be replaced by Jon Dunmore, and the band relocated to Aylesbury, under the guidance of Howard Jones's management. However, nothing materialised, Dunmore left, the band return to Bristol where Cox took over as lead vocalist. The band split shortly afterwards, but left a legacy of around 50 songs, recorded between 1983 and 1986, which contained some original material. After the band split, Dave Libby went on to write a song for Valerie Dore, which became a Top 20 hit in Italy.

== Full discography ==
- Frank Farian Corporation feat. Reggie Tsiboe: "Mother and Child Reunion" (1985 single) (credited as Force Majeur, a duo that is part of the FFC)

== Band members ==
Vocals: Richard Snow, Kerrie Cox, Judith Owen, Jon Dunmore
Keyboards: David Libby, Steve Libby
Bass: Larry Burr
Drums: Ben Mitchell, Paul Ackermann
Backing vocals: Maggie Hearne

Force Majeure at the Bristol Bridge Inn

== See also ==
- List of Bands from Bristol
- https://www.forcemajeuregroup.com/
