= Glaxo Babies =

English post-punk band

- Cover art from Dreams Interrupted, a compilation album covering the period 1978–1980

Background information
- Also known as: Gl*xo Babies
- Origin: Bristol, England
- Genres: Post-punk
- Years active: 1978–1980, 1985–1990, 2015–present
- Labels: Heartbeat, Cherry Red, Y
- Members: Dan Catsis; Geoff Alsopp; Tony Wrafter; Steve Street; Oscar Wrafter
- Past members: Rob Chapman; Tom Nichols; Charlie Llewellin; Tim Aylett; Alan Jones
- Website: www.myspace.com/GlaxoBabies

Glaxo Babies are a Bristol-based post-punk band, formed in late 1977. There were three distinct phases in the band's life and after initially breaking up in 1980, they reformed in 1985, only to finally break up again in 1990. The band reformed once again in 2015 for the Un-Peeled 2015 event with Steve Street on bass and Tony Wrafter's son Oscar on vocals.

== First phase ==
The band was formed by Tom Nichols (bassist), Dan Catsis (guitarist) and drummer Geoff Alsopp (previously Nichols and Alsopp had been in another Bristol based band called The Vultures). The initial band line-up was completed by Rob Chapman (singer) joining in November 1977, and their first gig was held just 3 weeks later in The Dockland Settlement, St Pauls, Bristol. The band signed to local label Heartbeat Records (marketed by Cherry Red), with their first release being the This Is Your Life EP in February 1979. This led to them recording their first session for BBC radio's John Peel the following April, and the track "It's Irrational", from this session, opened the seminal 1979 Bristol Compilation album "Avon Calling". For this release the band had been forced by pharmaceutical company Glaxo to change their name, and this resulted in the use of "Gl*xo Babies", with an asterisk replacing the "a", although subsequent recordings have used a mixture of the two forms.

Tony Wrafter (saxophone) had joined the band in early 1979, and in May 1979 drummer Geoff Alsopp was replaced by Welshman Charlie Llewellin. This line-up had just started to record their debut album in June 1979 at Crescent Studios, Bath with David Lord as engineer. However, due to artistic differences Rob Chapman promptly left the group after the recording of just a couple of run through tracks (including a song about Christine Keeler, former Prime Minister Harold Macmillan and the political scandal known as the Profumo affair).

== Second phase ==
Cover of the band's second LP, with the iconic Glaxo Babies image

Following the abrupt departure of Rob Chapman the other four members, supplemented by Tim Aylett (and later Alan Jones), took the band "into a more experimental area, leaning more towards a free-form fusion of jazz and dance rhythms", which resulted in them recording, in one day, the album Nine Months to the Disco. By the time this recording was released in March 1980 and reached No. 8 in the UK Indie Chart, the Gl*xo Babies had disbanded. Initially Tony Wrafter left, then Dan Catsis and Charlie Llewellin, all three of them going on to found Maximum Joy with Janine Rainforth, and John Waddington formerly of The Pop Group (Dan Catsis had also played in The Pop Group during 1979 and 1980 as a replacement for Simon Underwood). Rob Chapman joined The Transmitters, with whom he recorded one LP, "And We Call That Leisure Time". The single of Rob Chapman singing on Christine Keeler was released in 1979 on Heartbeat and in 1980 Shake (The Foundations) was released as a single off Nine Months to the Disco. Another Peel session had been recorded in February 1980 and the 4 tracks were released later that year on Y Records as the "Limited Entertainment EP". Heartbeats final Glaxos' release was a compilation album of early demos and unreleased tracks from the Rob Chapman period, called "Put Me on the Guest List".

In 2007, the Japanese label Birdsong reissued both of the band's albums on CD; Nine Months to the Disco included the extra track "Swampstomp" and Put Me on the Guest List included "Christine Keeler", "Nova Bossa Nova" and "Because of You (Live)" as bonus tracks.

== Third and final phase ==
The band (Rob Chapman, Dan Catsis and Charlie Llewellin) reconvened in the summer of 1985, and continued to record sporadically until they finally disbanded in 1990. The highlights from this third incarnation of the band were collected in 2007 on “The Porlock Factor: Psych Dreams and Other Schemes 1985–1990” on Cherry Red Records (in 2006 they had previously issued a compilation CD of singles, album tracks and unreleased tracks from their earlier work, “Dreams Interrupted: The Bewilderbeat Years 1978–1980”).

== Post–final break-up, 2015 reformation ==
Rob Chapman – after The Transmitters, Chapman had jobs in teaching and broadcasting on BBC Radio, eventually drifting into music journalism. He began contributing to the magazine Mojo, then in 2003 moved to Uncut, only to move back to Mojo in 2006. He is the author of several books, including a history of offshore pirate radio, Selling the Sixties (Routledge, 1992); an alternative history of the record sleeve, The Vinyl Junkyard (Booth Clibborn, 1997); and a biography of Syd Barrett, Syd Barrett: A Very Irregular Head (Faber, 2010). He currently works at the University of Huddersfield.

Dan Catsis – as of 2010, has been playing bass in the reformed Pop Group.

Tom Nichols – went on to be an art historian and lecturer at the University of Aberdeen and currently works at the University of Glasgow.

Tony Wrafter – continues to play saxophone and flute around the world.

Charlie Llewellin – went on to be drummer with Maximum Joy and Palace of Light in the UK. He has lived in Austin, Texas since September 1991, and in the 1990s played with Austin bands Eleanor Plunge, Jean Caffeine and the Gourds. In 2019 he and Maximum Joy singer Janine Rainforth released the album P.E.A.C.E. as MXMJoY.

In 2015, the band reformed, playing alongside other bands, for 'Un-Peeled 2015', a tribute show to the late Radio 1 DJ John Peel. They also played at The Exchange, Bristol in January 2016.

== Discography ==
=== Albums ===
- Nine Months to the Disco (1980, Heartbeat, UK, LP, HB 2)
- Put Me on the Guest List (1980, Heartbeat, UK, LP, HBM 3)
- Dreams Interrupted: The Bewilderbeat Years 1978–1980 (2006, Cherry Red, UK, CD, CDMRED291)
- The Porlock Factor: Psych Dreams and Other Schemes 1985–1990 (2007, Cherry Red, UK, CD, CDMRED322)
- Nine Months to the Disco [Reissue + Bonus Track] (2007, Birdsong, Japan, CD, BIRD-2006)
- Put Me on the Guest List [Reissue + Bonus Tracks] (2007, Birdsong, Japan, CD, BIRD-2007)

=== Singles and EPs ===
- This Is Your Life EP ("This Is Your Life" / "Stay Awake" / "Because of You" / "Who Killed Bruce Lee?") (1979, Heartbeat, UK, 12", PULSE 3)
- "Christine Keeler" / "Nova Bossa Nova" (1979, Heartbeat, UK, 7", PULSE 5)
- "Shake (The Foundations)" / "She Went to Pieces" (live) (1980, Heartbeat, UK, 7", PULSE 8)
- Limited Entertainment EP ("Limited Entertainment" / "Dahij" / "There'll Be No Room for You in the Shelter" / "Permission to Be Wrong") (1980, Y, UK, 7", Y 6)

=== Compilation appearances ===
- Labels Unlimited – The Second Record Collection (1979, Cherry Red, UK, LP, ARED 4)
- Avon Calling (1980, Heartbeat, UK, LP, HB 1)
- Western Stars – The Bands That Built Bristol Vol. 1 (2001, Bristol Archive Records, UK, CD, ARC 001)
- Avon Calling [Reissue + Unreleased Tracks and Heartbeat Singles Collection] (2005, Cherry Red, UK, CD, CDMRED292)
- 7" Up! (2006, Crippled Dick Hot Wax!, Germany, CD & LP, CDHW 103–2)
- D-I-Y Do It Yourself (2007, Soul Jazz Records, UK CD & LP, SJR CD 153)
- I'll Give You My Heart I'll Give You My Heart – The Cherry Red Records Singles Collection 1978–1983 (2008, Cherry Red, UK, 8xCD, CRCD BOX 4)

== See also ==
- List of bands from Bristol
- The Pop Group
- Maximum Joy
- The Transmitters
- Heartbeat Records
- Avon Calling
