= The X-Certs =

English band

- Origin: Bristol, England
- Genres: New wave, reggae
- Years active: 1978–1981
- Labels: Heartbeat; Cherry Red; Bristol Recorder; Bristol Archive
- Members: Clive Arnold, Simon Justice, Phil Lovering (Taf), Neil Mackie, Kevin Mills, Chris Bostock
- Website: The X-Certs website

The X-Certs were an English band formed in 1978, which originally started as a punk band. They released the track "Blue Movies" on the Heartbeat Records 1979 EP 4 Alternatives, and subsequently had "Anthem" included on the label's seminal compilation album Avon Calling. They contributed two tracks to Bristol Recorder 2, and were including reggae by the time of their 1981 Recreational Records single "Together/Untogether". This was to be their last recording as they split up in early 1981 when Chris Bostock was recruited by Bernie Rhodes to play with Johnny Britton.

Tracks have been re-released over the years. In 2009, the retrospective album Fussing & Fighting on Bristol Archive Records was released.
