= The Cortinas (punk band) =

English punk rock band

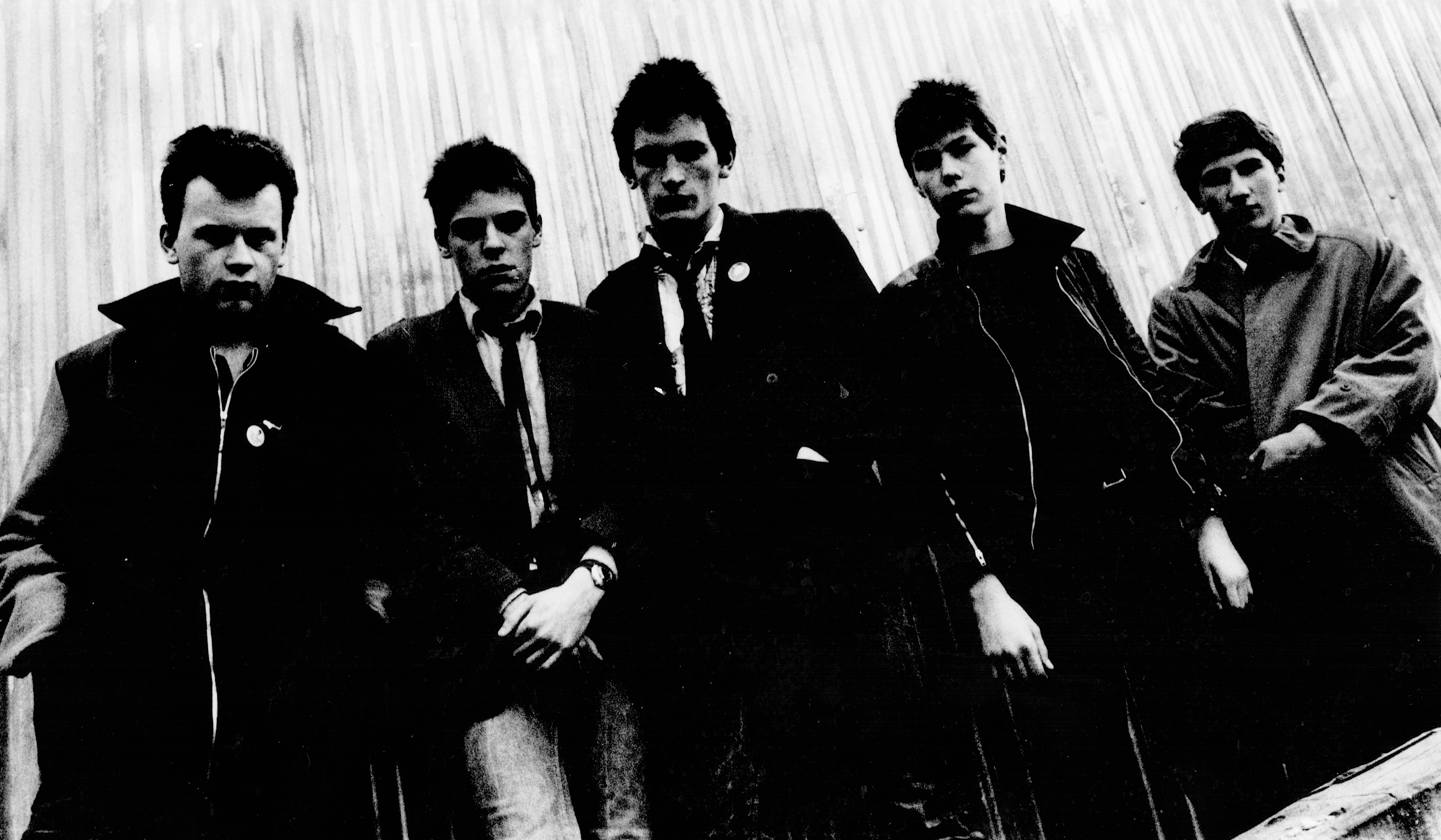
- The Cortinas in Bristol 1977 – Left to Right: Jeremy Valentine, Dexter Dalwood, Nick Sheppard, Daniel Swan & Mike Fewings (Photo: Jill Furmanovsky)

Background information
- Origin: Bristol, England
- Genres: Punk rock
- Years active: 1976–1978
- Labels: Step Forward, CBS
- Past members: Dexter Dalwood; Mike Fewings; Nick Sheppard; Daniel Swan; Jeremy Valentine

The Cortinas were a Bristol-based punk rock band, originally active between 1976 and 1978. Guitarist Nick Sheppard went on to play with the Clash. In 2001, the band's debut single, "Fascist Dictator" (originally released in June 1977), was included in a leading British music magazine's list of the best punk-rock singles of all time.

== Biography ==
Named after a car, the Ford Cortina, the band moved from R&B towards covering songs by punk forerunners like the New York Dolls and The Stooges.

The band developed a large and enthusiastic following in their hometown. Unfortunately, their growing popularity began to attract a great deal of crowd trouble.

The band were also frequent visitors to London and became one of the pioneering punk bands that played live in the first few months of the Roxy Club. They supported The Stranglers in January 1977 and then headlined twice the following month. The Cortinas headlined the Roxy again in March and April, supported by The Models on both occasions. In June 1977 they had their first headlining show at the Marquee Club. Later they played as support act for Blondie and Chelsea.

The Cortinas' first two singles, "Fascist Dictator" and "Defiant Pose", were released by Step Forward, the label run by The Police manager Miles Copeland and Mark Perry.

On 16 July 1977, a few weeks after releasing "Fascist Dictator", the band recorded a session at Maida Vale 4 studio, for John Peel at BBC Radio 1. The track listing was "Defiant Pose", "Television Families", "Having It", and "Further Education".

Later the Cortinas signed for CBS Records and released one album, True Romances. One critic described the album as "disappointing" but rescued from "bland oblivion" by "cheeky tracks such as "Ask Mr. Waverly" and "I Trust Valerie Singleton". Another called it a mix of "rock'n’roll, R&B and pop-rock" and therefore "much more mainstream in style and delivery" than the Step Forward singles. This was a view echoed by Wilson Neate of AllMusic: "Having begun life under the spell of '60s R&B and garage rock, the Cortinas soon emerged as Bristol's premiere punk band, injecting a speedy, shouty, confrontational edge into their sound for their first two singles ("Fascist Dictator" and "Defiant Pose"). By the time of their 1978 debut album for CBS, however, they had re-embraced their formative influences and added a more pop-friendly dimension... True Romances sounds more befitting of a bunch of middle-aged pub rockers than five teenage punk rockers".

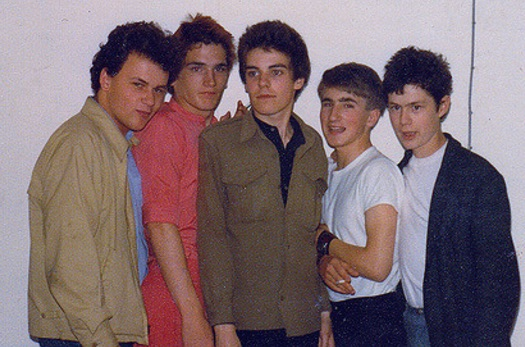
The Cortinas – Bristol – June 1977

== Post band careers ==
- Guitarist Nick Sheppard went on to play with Bristol showband The Spics before joining the final embodiment of the Clash where he played on their 6th studio album, Cut The Crap. He also played with Head. Sheppard moved to Perth, Australia in 1993, and has formed/played in two local bands, Heavy Smoker and the New Egyptian Kings with Shakir Pichler. Sheppard owns the Elroy clothing store on Beaufort Street in Mount Lawley
- Guitarist Mike Fewings went on to play with other Bristol bands Colortapes and Essential Bop
- Bass guitarist Dexter Dalwood went on to become a painter, earning representation from Gagosian Gallery, and a nomination for the 2010 Turner Prize
- Jeremy Valentine is currently a lecturer in Media at Queen Margaret University in Edinburgh, Scotland
- Daniel Swan moved to the United States and played with the Sneetches. In the early nineties, he worked for Cahn-Man Management in Oakland California who at the time managed Green Day, Jawbreaker and 510 records (Dance Hall Crashers). In 1998 he founded Swan Entertainment, a booking agency based in the San Francisco Bay Area

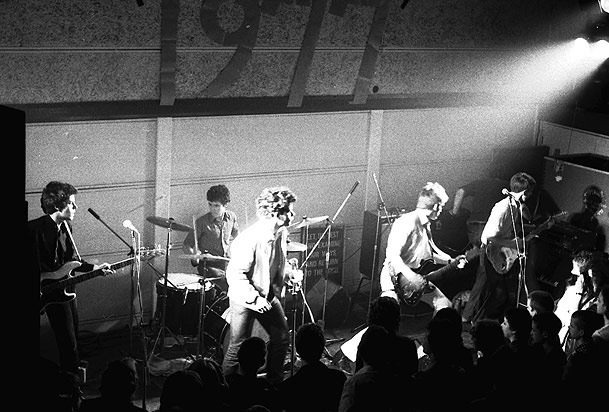
The Cortinas – Aklam Hall London July 1977

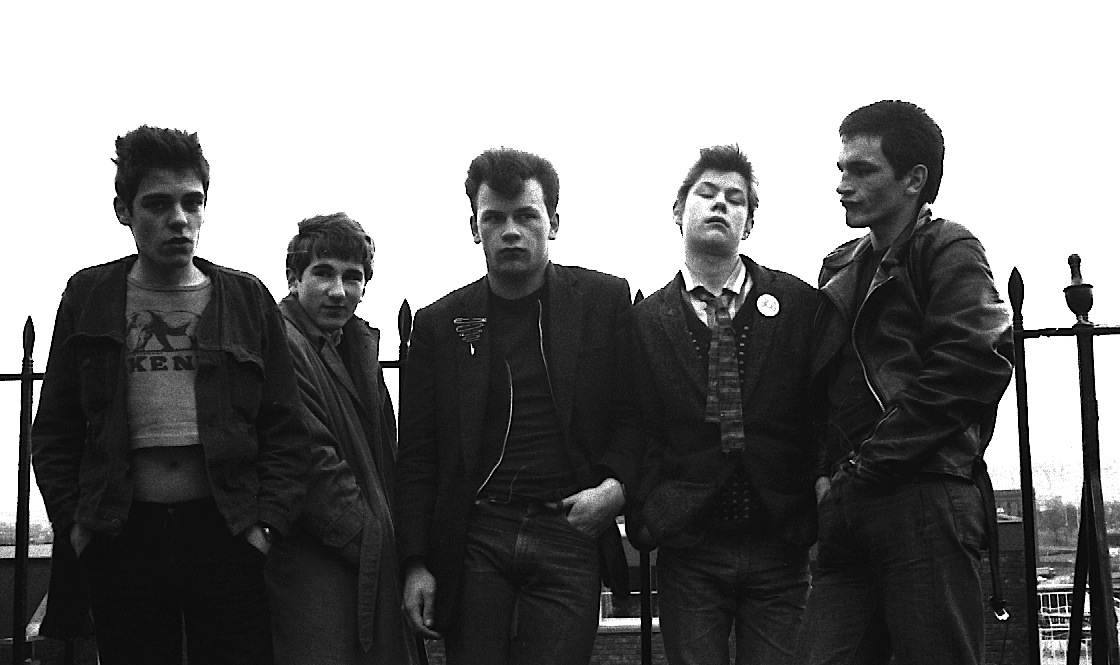
The Cortinas – Bristol March 1977

== Discography ==
=== Studio album ===
- True Romances (CBS, 82831, April 1978)

=== Singles ===
- "Fascist Dictator"/"Television Families" (Step Forward, SF 1, June 1977)
- "Defiant Pose"/"Independence" (Step Forward, SF 6, December 1977) Also released as a 12-inch single
- "Heartache"/"Ask Mr. Waverly" (CBS, CBS 6759, November 1978)

=== Compilation ===
- Mk.1 (Bristol Archive, 2010)

== See also ==
- List of punk bands from the United Kingdom
- List of 1970s punk rock musicians
- List of Peel Sessions
- List of bands from Bristol

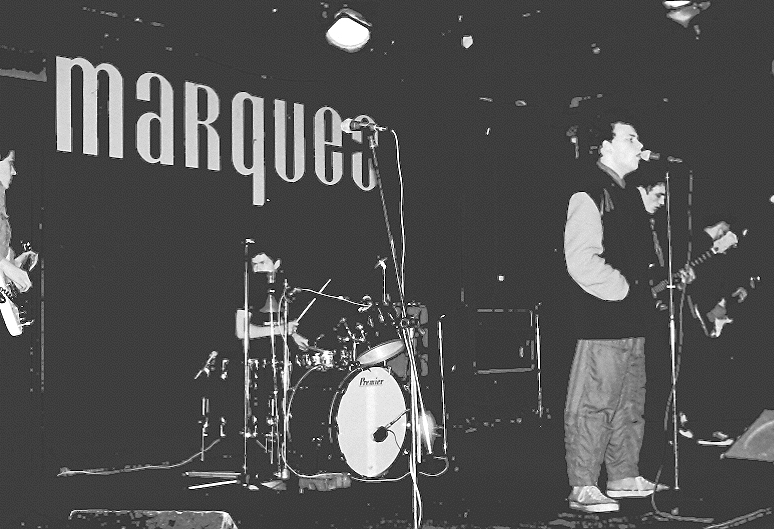
The Cortinas at the Marquee Club in London 1977
