= Avon Calling =

Compilation album by Various
- Released: 1979-10-05
- Recorded: Crescent Studios, Bath, Somerset, UK
- Genre: Post-punk, new wave
- Label: Heartbeat Records; Cherry Red
- Producer: David Lord and Glenn Tommey

Professional ratings
Review scores
Source	Rating
Allmusic	3.5/5 stars

Avon Calling is an album of tracks featuring bands from Bristol, UK, on local record label Heartbeat Records, and was originally released in 1979. All but 2 of the tracks were recorded at Crescent Studios in Bath by David Lord and Glenn Tommey, when the bands were "neatly fitting in on "off days" from on-going sessions by the likes of Peter Gabriel, The Korgis & Kate Bush."

At the time of the LP release Rick Joseph of the NME started his review of the album, "Avon Calling is the collective endeavour of 15 bands that live and languish around Britain's Most Unsung Major Metropolis. So, leaving aside any thoughts of the value of compilation albums in general, and digressions on rock geography in particular, it only remains to be said that 'Avon Calling' is a veritable riot of stunning pop."

In 2005 the album was re-released as a Double CD, that included bonus unreleased tracks and selections from each of the first 12 Heartbeat singles from 1978 to 1981. It starts with an excerpt from John Peel's BBC Radio Show where he introduces the album as, “And we had numerous, well quite a few compilation LPs in recent, in the past year …but now, there's a new one called Avon Calling: The Bristol Compilation, and this is really the standard by which the others must be judged in future. Because it really is superb there are 15 tracks on the LP, genuinely not a bad one amongst them, and a lot of really good stuff. I’m going to start really, side 1, band 1, and will work my way through it over the next few programmes…”

Gerard Langley of The Blue Aeroplanes wrote in the sleeve notes for the reissue, "These CDs will give you actual punks (X-Certs), reclaimed pub rockers with skinny trousers and ties (Private Dicks), up-tempo attempted popmeisters (Various Artists), arty kids in a strop (Glaxo Babies), New York bohemian wannabes (Apartment), rock-poetic wannabes (Art Objects), teenage dubheads (Double Vision), closet Doors fans with a grudge (Essential Bop), and many more."

Also the Allmusic review by Stewart Mason notes, "What's most illuminating about Avon Calling … is that it puts the lie to the narrow definition of post-punk that has grown in the popular imagination since the turn of the millennium, when it seems that this era in British pop music consisted solely of bands that sounded sort of like either Joy Division or the Human League. As a matter of fact, there's little Manchester gloom or straight synth pop among these 46 songs." and, "Touches like a bit of John Peel introducing the Glaxo Babies' "It's Irrational" and an interesting, scene-setting radio interview by DJ Simon Edwards set the social context. This might seem like the sort of compilation that's mostly for boffins, but there is enough solid material on Avon Calling: The Bristol Compilation to make it worth recommending to even the casual fan of the style.”

At the time of the original release of this LP, the city of Bristol was in the short lived (1974–1996) English county of Avon, hence the play on the Avon Products advertising slogan.

== Track listing (2005 CD reissue) ==
=== Disc 1: Avon Calling: The Bristol Compilation ===
1. "It's Irrational" – Gl*xo Babies
2. "On the Continent" – Europeans
3. "Green Is in the Red" – Private Dicks
4. "Too Much Commotion" – Moskow
5. "Chronicle" – Essential Bop
6. "What You've Got" – Directors
7. "Own Up" – Various Artists
8. "Slugweird" – Sneak Preview
9. "Sound" – The Stingrays
10. "Anthem" – The X-Certs
11. "The Alternative" – Apartment
12. "Cross-Slide" – The Numbers
13. "Nothing" – Vice Squad
14. "Move Fast-Stay Ahead" – Stereo Models
15. "My Dead Mother" – Double Vision
16. "Poison" – Apartment (Bonus unreleased track)
17. "Desire" – Sneak Preview (Bonus unreleased track)
18. "Don't Follow My Lead" – Private Dicks (Bonus unreleased track)
19. "List '99'" – Double Vision (Bonus unreleased track)
20. "Down at the Park" – Vitus Dance (Bonus unreleased track)
21. "You Have Been Warned" – The X-Certs (Bonus unreleased track)

=== Disc 2: The Heartbeat Singles Collection 1978 – 1981 ===
1. "I Don't Want My Heart to Rule My Head" – Social Security
2. "Choc Ice" – Social Security
3. "Europeans" – Europeans
4. "Voices" – Europeans
5. "This Is Your Life" – Gl*xo Babies
6. "Who Killed Bruce Lee?" – Gl*xo Babies
7. "Alternative Suicide" – The Numbers
8. "Blue Movies" – The X-Certs
9. "Hotel Rooms" – Joe Public
10. "Back to Ireland" – 48 Hours
11. "Christine Keeler" – Gl*xo Babies
12. "Nova Bossa Nova" – Gl*xo Babies
13. "She Said Go" – Private Dicks
14. "Private Dicks" – Private Dicks
15. "The Car" – Apartment
16. "Winter" – Apartment
17. "Shake" – Gl*xo Babies
18. "Nobody Loves Me" – The Letters
19. "Don't Want You Back" – The Letters
20. "Showing Off to Impress the Girls" – Art Objects
21. "Birdsong" – Final Eclipse
22. "New Dawn" – Final Eclipse
23. "Everybody Thinks Everybody Else Is Dead Bad" – The Skodas
24. "Mouth" – The Skodas

== Avon Calling 2 ==
On 14 September 2010 Heartbeat and Bristol Archive Records brought out a CD follow-up to the original album, calling it Avon Calling 2 (ARC160CD).

=== Avon Calling 2 ===
1. "Self Confession" – Social Security
2. "The Only One" – Europeans
3. "Broken Glass" – Apartment
4. "You Got It" – Private Dicks
5. "People of Today" – The X-Certs
6. "Audition Room" – Essential Bop
7. "Retrospect" – Apartment
8. "Mr Magoo" – Sneak Preview
9. "Letter in My Desk" – Joe Public
10. "Train to Brighton" – 48 Hours
11. "Showcase" – Directors
12. "Want Some Fun" – Private Dicks
13. "I Can't Get Out" – Sneak Preview
14. "Middle of Nowhere" – Stereo Models
15. "Any Takers" – The Phone
16. "Suicide Man" – Sean Ryan
17. "Faster" – Joe Public
18. "Dancer" – T.V.I.'s
19. "Empty Promises" – Directors
20. "You Might as Well Enjoy Yourself" – Unknown

== See also ==
- List of Bands from Bristol
- Heartbeat Records
- Bristol Archive Records
- Post-punk
