= Heartbeat Productions =

- Founded: 1978
- Founder: Simon Edwards
- Distributors: Cherry Red; Spartan; The Cartel
- Country of origin: United Kingdom
- Location: Bristol
- Official website: Heartbeat Productions

Heartbeat Productions is the parent company of a number of record labels originating from Bristol, England. Heartbeat Records was formed in 1978, and other labels have been added over the years to cater for specific niche markets or bands: Riot City Records in 1980, Disorder Records in 1981, FSA Records in 1992 and Trash City Records in 1994.

== Heartbeat Records ==
Heartbeat Records was started in 1978 as a partnership of local musician Simon Edwards and Tony Dodd of Tony's Record Shop. Simon Edwards recorded and produced the first single, "I don't want my heart to rule my head" by Social Security, after which Tony Dodd decided to concentrate on his shop and Simon Edwards took over sole control. The label's second single, Europeans by Europeans, caught the attention of Iain McNay of Cherry Red and they signed a marketing agreement with Heartbeat. The next release was the 12-inch EP, "This Is Your Life", from the influential Glaxo Babies, recorded at Crescent Studios in Bath. A number of other singles were released; however, to accommodate the large number of bands around at the time, they brought out the seminal Avon Calling – The Bristol Compilation LP. Four further LPs were released: two by the Glaxo Babies, The Transmitters and Art Objects (later to become Blue Aeroplanes) before the label became inactive in 1984. It was revived with the 1997 album release of a 1967 long lost live radio recording (from Stockholm, Sweden) by American 1960s psych band The Electric Prunes.

Cherry Red in recent years has repackaged tracks and albums from the Heartbeat back catalogue, including previously unreleased songs from the Glaxo Babies, Art Objects and The X-Certs.

== Riot City Records ==
Simon Edwards was looking to release records by local punk band Vice Squad; however, Cherry Red were not enthusiastic, so with Dave Bateman and Shane Baldwin from the band he set up Riot City Records (they had chosen the name, as Bristol had recently been in the news due to the 1980 St. Pauls riot). The label was intended to release music from a new generation of punk bands that were forming, and it had been Vice Squad's intention to actively select the ones who would record for the label; however, due to touring commitments they did not have the time and Simon Edwards soon took over.

In 1982, an American punk compilation album, Hell Comes to Your House (Reagan 1) was licensed from Bemisbrain Records USA, and issued on the subsidiary Riot State Records label. In 1985 Chaotic Dischord released the spoof NOW! album, "NOW! That's What I Call A Fuckin' Racket (Vol 1)" (GRR 1) on another subsidiary, Not Very Nice Records.

In its relatively short lifespan the label had over 40 releases, selling nearly 250,000 records and was one of the prominent exponents of British punk music, regularly having hits in the UK Indie Chart.

== Disorder Records ==
The hardcore noise band Disorder originally formed in Bristol in 1980. After Riot City Records declined to sign them, the band launched their own label Disorder Records in 1981, with Heartbeat Records and Riot City boss Simon Edwards. Over a period of three years they released three 7-inch EP's and one 12-inch EP, before moving on to local anarchist label Children of the Revolution Records (COR). A final 12-inch EP, The Singles Collection, was released in 1984.

=== Disorder releases ===
Cat No.	Artist	Title	Date	Configuration
ORDER 1	Disorder	Complete Disorder EP	1981	7-inch EP
ORDER 2	Disorder	"Distortion To Deafness"	1981	7-inch single
12 ORDER 3	Disorder	Perdition	1983	12-inch EP
ORDER 4	Disorder	Mental Disorder EP	1983	7-inch EP
12 ORDER 5	Disorder	The Singles Collection	1984	12-inch EP

== FSA Records ==
Set up in 1992 for the recently formed Bristol band Flying Saucer Attack. Their first single in 1992 had several limited editions, each with part homemade sleeves of differing designs. The first album in 1993 was self-titled, but is sometimes referred to as Rural Psychedelia. Vinyl releases were the preference of the band and the records tended to sell out quickly, due to their cult status. After their third single in 1994 the band joined Domino Records, however, in 1999 they returned to FSA Records issuing the LP "Mirror", before finally disbanding.

=== FSA releases ===
Cat No.	Artist	Title	Date	Configuration
FSA 6	Flying Saucer Attack	"Soaring High" / "Standing Stones"	1993	7-inch single
FSA 61	Flying Saucer Attack	"Wish" / "Oceans"	1993	7-inch single
FSA62	Flying Saucer Attack	Flying Saucer Attack (Rural Psychedelia)	1993	LP
FSA 63	Flying Saucer Attack	"Crystal Shade" / "Distance"	1994	7-inch single
FSA 64	Flying Saucer Attack	Mirror	1999	LP, CD

== Trash City Records ==
Trash City was primarily set up in 1994 to issue 7-inch singles by US garage bands. It only released one record in its first year and it was not until 1996 and the signing of UK band Headcase, that the label issued another record. Three more singles and two albums were to eventually follow.

=== Trash City releases ===
Cat No.	Artist	Title	Date	Configuration
SMUT 001	The Mono Men	"Hexed" / "Skin & Bones '65"	1994	7-inch single
SMUT 002	Headcase	"MTFV Hate Awards" / "Rave Sucks"	1996	7-inch single
SMUT 003	Headcase	"Once Again" / "Summertime"	1997	7-inch single
SMUT 004	Kenisia	"Shawn Kemp" / "Sometimes Just Don't Know" / "Indifference"	2000	7-inch single
SMUT 005	The Merics	"Imaginary Girlfriend" / "Dr Fonseka" / "Jackie Chan"	2000	7-inch single
SLEEZE 1	Kenisia	Crash Helmet Hoopla	2001	CD album
SLEEZE 2	AKO	Find Yourself	2001	CD album

== Reissues on other labels ==
Bristol Archive Records are currently providing some of the Heartbeat Records back catalogue tracks for download, through the usual outlets (Amazon, iTunes, etc.).

== See also ==
- List of Bands from Bristol
- Culture of Bristol
- Avon Calling
- Bristol Archive Records
- the Cartel
- List of record labels
- List of Record Labels from Bristol
- Bristol Record Labels
