= Mirror (Flying Saucer Attack album) =

Studio album by Flying Saucer Attack
- Released: 17 January 2000
- Recorded: 1997–99
- Studio: StAR Studios (tracks 7–10)
- Genres: Psychedelia; space rock; post-rock; electronic; shoegaze; drum and bass; psychedelic folk
- Length: 50:46
- Labels: FSA Records; Drag City
- Producers: Dave Pearce; Rocker

Flying Saucer Attack chronology
New Lands (1997)	Mirror (2000)	Instrumentals 2015 (2015)

Mirror is the fourth studio album by English space rock band Flying Saucer Attack, released by FSA Records and Drag City on 17 January 2000. Lead member David Pearce recorded the album, his second solo project released with the Flying Saucer Attack name, with the assistance of collaborator and English producer Rocker from 1997 to 1999 during a long period of depression. The album builds upon the sampling and noise approaches of the band's previous album, New Lands (1997), exploring electronic experimentation with influences from drum and bass, in addition to the lo-fi noise pop and gentle psychedelic folk that he originally established the band's style with.

Pearce consciously wrote more direct lyrics on the album, and his vocals and melodies are more pronounced and decipherable than on previous albums, where they were obscured and electronically processed. Upon release, the album was greeted with favourable reviews from critics, complimenting its psychedelic sound, and was a moderate college radio success. Nonetheless, it was the final Flying Saucer Attack album for fifteen years, with Pearce putting the project on hiatus following the album's release.

== Background and recording ==
After their critically acclaimed second album Further (1995), Rachel Brook left Flying Saucer Attack to focus on her own project Movietone, rendering Flying Saucer Attack a solo project for remaining member Dave Pearce. After issuing the rarities compilation album Chorus (1995) to close "phase one" of the band, his first solo album under the Flying Saucer Attack name, New Lands, was a conscious attempt to start "phase two" of the band. Exploring new approaches such as sampling, and a more aggressive noise approach, almost disregarding "traditional song structure altogether" the album has retrospectively been referred to as bridging the gap between Further and Mirror.

While recording Mirror, Pearce was suffering from depression. Having felt that "phase two" of the band "never really happened", he instead posed Mirror as a new "phase two." He recorded Mirror from 1997–99 with contributions from his fellow Bristolian collaborator Rocker. As with New Lands, Mirror was largely recorded on a Yamaha 8-track recorder "with a dual cassette thing". Pearce stated: "Some people may go, 'Oh my god, a cassette eight-track! Oh dear, oh dear.' Even if they can handle the idea of a cassette four-track, they can’t handle the idea of cassette eight-track, but it sounds alright to me."

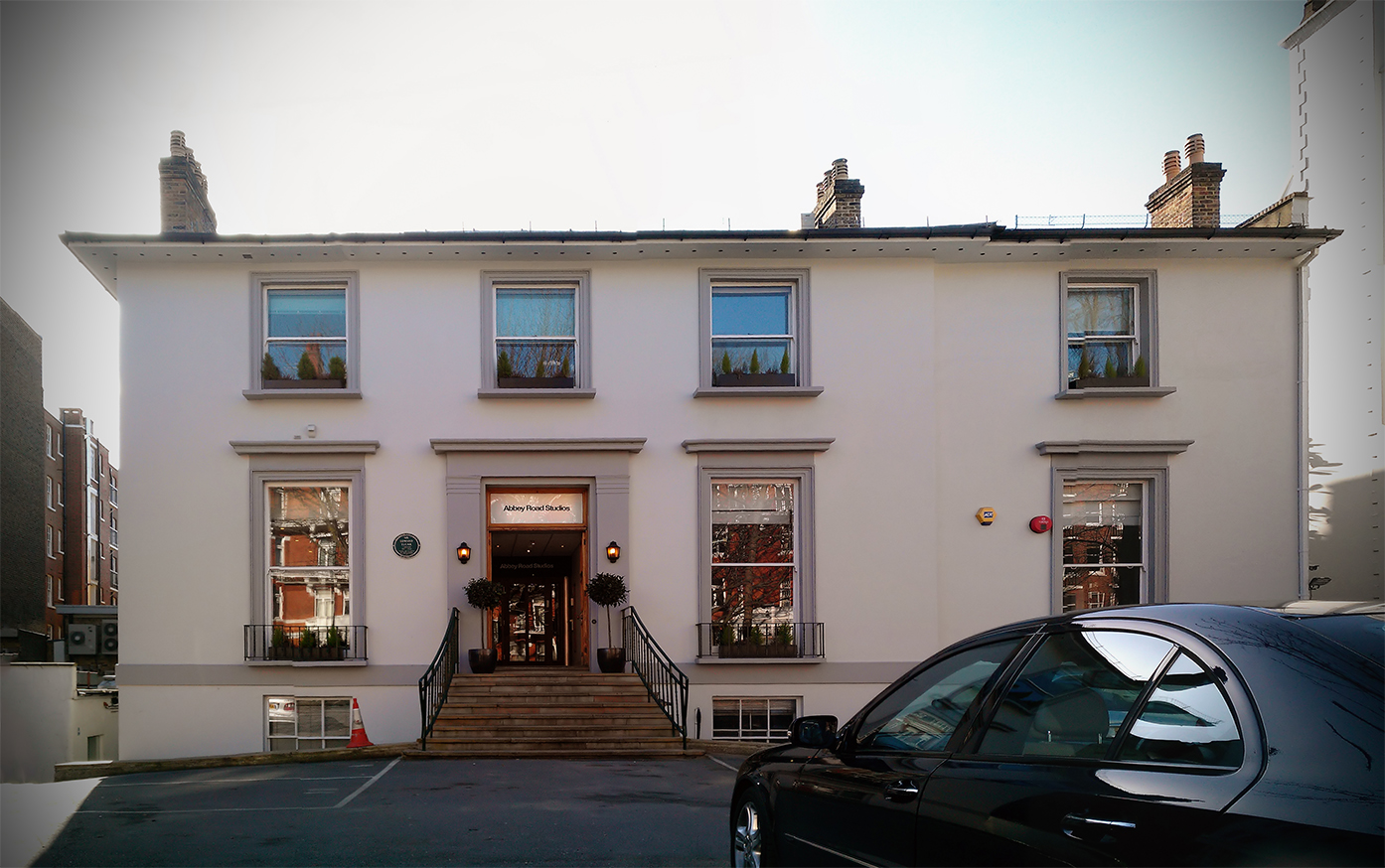
Mirror was mastered at Abbey Road Studios.

With regards to some of Mirror being recorded at Rocker's house, presumably the StAR Studios mentioned in the liner notes as the recording studio for four songs, Pearce noted his "fairly proper equipment", having been "building up lots of stuff over the years", although, as he revealed to Magnet, parts of the album were recorded in Pearce's home with his own equipment, before "[meshing] it together": "there are a number of parts that Rocker and I messed with over here a little bit. All the songs I did entirely here or I started them with Rocker and then finished over here. There’s nothing that was done entirely with Rocker’s digital set-up."

Under the influence of Rocker, who had acquired a sampler and "wanted to see if he could make it work," Pearce decided to make Mirror more rhythmic than its predecessors, and a departure from the "one snare, one [cymbal] drumming" he had grown accustomed to: "I thought it would be interesting to see what it would be like to have fairly overt beats, however out of date they may be. I just wanted to see if that could work." As is tradition for Pearce, the folkier songs on the album were recorded alone in his small kitchen. Nick Webb mastered the album at London's famous Abbey Road Studios.

== Music and lyrics ==
Considered the band's most accessible album, Mirror features tracks that explore experimentation with genres and sounds that were new to Pearce, including electronic music and beats inspired by drum and bass, most of which are largely prevalent in the album's second half, in addition to some of Pearce's melancholic acoustic folk songs. According to Jason Kane of Allmusic, Mirror has a "soothing and ambient feel" due to its "blurring of lines between noise and notes, of sounds and music," although Ryan Schreiber felt that, unlike prior albums, Mirror places its focuses on songs, with "the effects pushed just below the surface." Mirror has been referred to as "space-psych" and "expansive, tribal, techno-influenced psychedelia." Pearce, speaking to Ptolemaic Terrascope, said: “What I think I was trying to do before, I’ve done a bit better this time. By ‘better’ I mean ‘nearer’ to what I’ve been trying to do all along... something came out right this time."

Mirror also somehow manages to encapsulate most everything Pearce had done before, from unprepossessing acoustic laments, to blasted guitar scapes, to fried electronic pulsations, while also bringing new ideas to the table.

— Jon Dale of FACT Magazine

The album's background is layered with "atmospheric guitars", whilst "simple basslines provide the anchor, and sound effects take the sound further into space." In keeping with the album's variety, several of the songs incorporate "actual percussion." Unlike on previous albums, the folk songs on Mirror have intelligible lyrics and decipherable melodies. Pearce's vocals on the album are gentle, giving the album a mellow feel despite its sometimes aggressive music. A reviewer for Opus FM summed up Mirror by saying it "is certainly noisy, fuzzy, and psychedelic as all get out. However, it’s also incredibly listenable."

Pearce felt the need "to make songs with an end, if not a chorus," and in an interview, he commented that he was "quite pleased with [Mirror]. I'm not so embarrassed about the singing. However abstract it is, they’re still meant to be songs. In the past, they weren’t very song-y, and this time I did really want for them to be songs." Unlike New Lands, which Pearce has expressed dissatisfaction with, Pearce said that, with Mirror, he "had the title before any of it. In a way, that effected the kind of stuff recorded for it." He elaborated on his songwriting:

"Yeah, the idea was to be more direct, and I think some of it is. I felt like my singing was better so we turned it up a bit. Also, I wanted to try to do something with the lyric side of it and be more direct. Still, I don’t know that I have anything to say, and if I do, it probably comes through more in the music. Most of my opinions on things aren’t really the kind of things I’d want to put into songs. Like, “I hate government.” Well, if I put that into a song, it would just sound embarrassing. You have to be a really good lyricist to tackle a subject like that."

Finding Mirror to "reflect both sides of the millennial chasm, incorporating the atmosphere of the countryside with the sound of hyper-modern urbania," critic Kerwin So felt connections between Mirror and a combination of both urban and rural life: "It might be fair to label Mirror as subliminal trip-hop–indeed, not too long ago Pearce moved from the English countryside to the more urban environment of Bristol, home of such artists as Massive Attack and Portishead. The effect of both rural and urban environments shines clearly throughout this record, suggesting a potential future in which a cohesive humanity can reconcile the introspection and simplicity of the countryside with the technology and progress of modern life."

=== Songs ===
"Space (1999)" opens the album with "sweeping billows of sound," and features "white noise fuzz and phased acoustic-slide guitar" alongside melodic vocals. Taking influence from English folk, the simple "Suncatcher" is purely acoustic. "Islands" is over eight minutes long, morphing "through distinct and attention-grabbing phases, beginning sparsely and building into spiralling crescendos." "Tides", like "Suncatcher", is acoustic-led, albeit "with a thin strand of whispery electronic squeal running through it." The darker "Chemicals" is an industrial song, reminiscent of New Lands and containing a "throbbing electronic rhythm, crunching beat, and processed vocals." "Dark Wind" is an ambient composition, "with undulating waves of sound blown by soft electronic winds, a rapid, mutating beat and strumming acoustic guitars fading in and out in the background."

"Winter Song" is a "jungle/drone-rock sound-clash," "pairing a driving, organic drum’n'bass rhythm with slabs of post-My-Bloody-Valentine noise and imbuing the resultant clamour with grim and bloody determination." The song's rhythm has been compared to Psychick Warriors ov Gaia. "River" is "pure psychedelic pop, albeit pop turned brittle and wobbly by production trickery." The song features a standard rock beat that nonetheless fuels "a rare ethereal, distortion-soaked pop song." "Dust" features folk motifs over a drum loop, contrasting with the metallic off-kilter rhythm and electronic ambient textures of following song "Rise". Closing song "Star City" ends with a white noise section like that which opens the album, essentially bringing the album full circle.

== Release ==
Mirror was released on 17 January 2000 in the United States by Drag City and on 25 January 2000 in the United Kingdom by FSA Records. The original British edition was a limited edition run of 2,000 CDs and 1,000 transparent LPs. Although the album did not chart on any national music chart, it did nonetheless chart on several radio charts; on the CMJ Top 200, a chart "compiled from the top albums played at college and non-commercial radio," Mirror peaked at number 26, and stayed on the chart for over 10 weeks. The album also peaked at number 13 on Core's radio chart. Pearce mentioned that Drag City were pleased with the album's sales, and were eager for follow-up material. Drag City remastered and reissued the album on 10 June 2016 as an LP in the United States.

The album's psychedelic album artwork, designed by Savage Leisurecentre with typography from Savage Pencil and mirrorball imagery from Sandra Eggington, was seen as heralding in the band's new stylistic direction, and in complete contrast to previous album covers. Ryan Schreiber compared the sleeve to "a Grateful Dead reissue" and noted that "in place of liner notes is a blatantly hallucinogenic image of a psychedelic rainbow over a body of water, with creepy mutations of animals splashing about, and warped, gloopy flying saucers zooming past pink clouds. In a time when drugs are so revered by the hipster elite, it's good to see somebody living it up a little." Aural Innovations noted: "From its wildly psychedelic, mirror ball cover and inner-sleeve art featuring wobbling flying saucers careening over a churning ocean filled with rainbows, pink rabbits, and sea monsters, we know we're in for something different this time from Flying Saucer Attack."

== Reception and aftermath ==
Professional ratings
Review scores
Source	Rating
AllMusic	3/5 stars
CMJ New Music Monthly	(favourable)
Pitchfork	(7.5/10)
PopMatters	(8/10)

Mirror was favourably reviewed by music critics and journalists upon release. George Zahora of PopMatters rated the album 8/10 and noted that, although the album is "initially cold, downbeat and distant" as a listening experience, it "will eventually seem beautiful, austere and stoic. If the sounds are new to you, you may find them too off-putting to justify repeated spins. Headphones will help you get the best perspective on this immersive listening experience. And if Mirror seems poppy to you, it’s time to lay off the Terence McKenna books." Rating the album 7.5/10, Pitchfork writer Ryan Schreiber said that it was the band's best album since Further. Kerwin So of Consumable Online asked of readers: "put this record on, take a deep breath, and listen with the lights off. And see where it takes you."

Jordan N. Mamone of CMJ New Music Monthly was favourable, and said the album's "real surprises are the static-y, post-techno beats, which, when paired with Pearce's alternately distortion drenched songs, lend an uncharacteristic, urban vibrancy to portions of the work." Rating the album three stars out of five, AllMusic's Jason Kane felt that, although the album occasionally meanders, "overall, these surges of sound are best enjoyed in the late evening or early morning hours, depending on your intention. Both results are great. Either you will enter one of your most relaxed states of sleep or will awaken as if by a wave of feathers." Aural Innovations magazine felt that "with his Flying Saucer now grounded, [Pearce is] looking for new ways to fly, and new dimensions of sound to explore. Pearce himself felt that this album recaptured a bit of the spirit of the early FSA recordings."

Today, Mirror is regarded as the culmination of Pearce's series of albums "that incorporated beats and a slightly glossier production." In a 2015 "beginner's guide to Flying Saucer Attack", Jon Dale of Fact Magazine said "Pearce sounds free on Mirror, as though he’s enjoying music again." In a biography of the band, Jason Ankeny of Allmusic retrospectively commented that the album "contained some of the project's quietest, folkiest material, as well as blown-out excursions into drum'n'bass similar to Third Eye Foundation." Similarly, a NTS Radio staff broadcast categorized the track "Rise" as an example of "blissbeat" or "drum & bliss", a term coined by Scott Cortez of Lovesliescrushing to categorize indie electronica combining elements of shoegaze and drum and bass.

In 2000, Pearce began work on the band's follow-up album, and spoke about it in an interview at the time, saying the work he had already completed for it "doesn't seem to be along the same lines as Mirror. I don't know what it is—it's pretty unfinished—but it's not going to be more drumbeats. It's going to be more bleak acoustic songs." Nonetheless, Pearce put Flying Saucer Attack on hiatus after the release of Mirror, although kept the band's name alive by sporadically publishing limited edition releases of rare, archival recordings. In 2015, Pearce resumed recording as Flying Saucer Attack, and recorded and released the album Instrumentals 2015 later in the same year.

== Track listing ==
All songs written by Dave Pearce, except where noted.

1. "Space (1999)" – 3:23
2. "Suncatcher" – 2:44
3. "Islands" – 8:34
4. "Tides" – 2:49
5. "Chemicals" (Pearce, Rocker) – 3:39 (featuring Rocker)
6. "Dark Wind" – 4:44
7. "Winter Song" – 4:39 (featuring Rocker)
8. "River" – 3:56 (featuring Rocker)
9. "Dust" – 5:09 (featuring Rocker)
10. "Rise" (Pearce, Rocker) – 6:50 (featuring Rocker)
11. "Star City" – 4:12

== Personnel ==
Adapted from Mirror's liner notes:

- Sanda Eggington – artwork (mirrorball images)
- Savage Leisurecentre – design (sleeve design)
- Savage Pencil – illustration, typography (lettering)
- Nick Webb – mastering
- Dave Pearce – writing

== Charts ==
Chart (2000)	Peak position
CMJ Top 200	26
Core Radio	13
