= Popol Vuh (disambiguation) =

Popol Vuh is a work of mythology and history of the Quiché Maya of Guatemala.

Popol Vuh may also refer to:

- Popol Vuh (band), an ambient/krautrock musical group from Germany
- Popol Ace, a Norwegian progressive rock band formerly named Popol Vuh
- "Popol Vuh I", "Popul Vuh II" and "Popul Vuh III", songs by British group Flying Saucer Attack from Flying Saucer Attack and Chorus
- Popol Vuh (Ginastera), an incomplete orchestral suite by Argentinian composer Alberto Ginastera
