= Tribo de Jah =

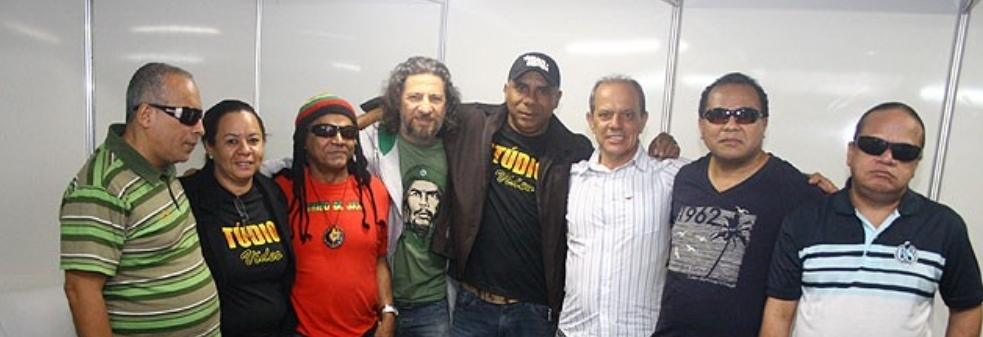

Background information
- Origin: Maranhão, Brazil
- Genres: Reggae
- Years active: 1980–present
- Labels: Indie Records; LGK Music; Independent
- Members: Fauzi Beydoun; Pedro Beydoun; Jesiel Bives; Aquiles Rabelo; João Rodrigues
- Past members: Frazão; Zé Orlando; Marlon Siqueira; Keké Enes
- Website: http://www.tribodejah.com.br

Tribo de Jah is a reggae band from Brazil formed in 1986 at the Maranhão's capital city, São Luís is known as the Brazilian Jamaica, by Fauzi Beydoun, who in that time was a multinational CEO coming from Ivory Coast in África, that maintained a successful reggae program on a radio in town. It was in this school where the members met. Four band members are fully blind while the fifth has partial vision.

While buying equipment to form a band, Fauzi had a conversation with the leader of a band called "Banda Reflexo", whose musicians are still acquainted with him today. There, they worked as hired musicians, playing in São Luis and nearby cities parties, running a repertoire that held all the successful rhythms from that time, such as reggae, lambada, dance, serestas, meringues etc. As a peculiar feature, the band is formed by four visually impaired men who had met each other still young at Escola de Cegos do Maranhão and awake to music using school's old instruments (a music keyboard with missing piano keys, a guitar missing chords and the drummer used to use the writing desk to set the pace). Then, they agreed to follow together the project to form a reggae music band.

Contested by the cultural elite, but embraced by the masses, reggae music became one of the most relevant features of maranhense culture, where it was created a very singular way to listen and dance the rhythm, creating an aspect that is unique in the entire world. At that time, the "radiolas", or sound-systems, recognized in this manner in Jamaica, were responsible for spreading reggae music in the whole state, while different reggae clubs maintained the rhythm on top attending a great public frequency, even though reggae was still not played on radios.

In this situation, Tribo de Jah started to propagate its reggae roots, approaching social, political, spiritual subjects with love and peace messages. The band opened a market for reggae music in Brazil, playing in places where the Jamaican rhythm was never heard before attracting a legion of fans in the entire country.

The band was the pioneer introducing reggae theme in Brazil: terms like "Jah" (God), "Babylon", "Roots" (title of their first album), among others, were never been spread nationally until then, what made the culture to be known in large scale by fans and other bands.

The band's success out of the borders is due to Tribo de Jah sing in other tree languages besides Portuguese: French, Spanish and English.

Beyond international concerts, the band recorded the album "In Version" in Interlaken, Switzerland; "Reggae'n Blues" album in San Diego, California, featuring musicians that followed Peter Tosh, such as the bass player George Fullwood, the drummer Santa Davis, the guitar player Tony Chin, among others. Tribo de Jah also recorded an entirely album in English to the foreign Market, entitled "Love to the World, Peace to the People".

Recorded 2008 in Belem, Pará, the last bands DVD, has as its main song and album title "Live in Amazon", a global appeal against deforestation: "Cease the fire in the forest or we all shall burn...", which brought the Jamaican singer featuring ex-Gladiators singer Clinton Fearon.

The last album was released in 2014 titled Pedra de Salão, and it makes immersion in the essence of Mararanhão cultural reggae, hearkening back to its genesis.

The Reggae Maranhão Museum features relics of reggae, such as a guitar from the Maranhense band Tribo de Jah, used by the band in more than 20 countries, as part of the group's history, having been used in the main recordings of their songs and in national and international major concerts.

== Members ==
- Fauzi Beydoun – Vocalist, Guitar and writer
- Pedro Beydoun - Guitar, Vocalist
- Jesiel Bives – Keyboard
- Aquiles Rabelo – Bass
- João Rodrigues – Drums
- Neto Enes - Guitar

== Albums ==
- Roots Reggae – 1995
- Ruínas da Babilônia – 1996
- Reggae'n Blues (Fauzi Beydoun's solo) – 1997
- Reggae na Estrada – 1998
- 2000 Anos Ao Vivo – 1999
- Além do Véu de Maya – 2000
- Essencial – 2001
- A Bob Marley – 2001
- Ao Vivo 15 Anos – 2002
- Guerreiros da Tribo – 2003
- In Version – 2004
- The Babylon Inside – 2006
- Love to the World, Peace to the People – 2007
- Refazendo – 2008
- DVD Live in Amazon – 2009
- Pedra de Salão – 2014
