= Movietone =

Movietone may refer to:

- Movietone (band), a Bristol-based British music group
- Movietone News, a company producing cinema newsreels from the 1920s onwards
- Movietone Records, a budget subsidiary of 20th Century Fox' record division
- The Movietone sound system for recording synchronised sound onto film
