= Ghost (Third Eye Foundation album) =

Studio album by The Third Eye Foundation
- Released: 22 April 1997
- Genre: Electronic
- Length: 47:34
- Label: Domino Recording Company
- Producer: Matt Elliott

The Third Eye Foundation chronology
In Version (1996)	Ghost (1997)	You Guys Kill Me (1998)

Professional ratings
Review scores
Source	Rating
AllMusic	3/5 stars
Almost Cool	7.5/10
NME	7/10

Ghost is a studio album by Matt Elliott, released under the moniker The Third Eye Foundation. It was originally released on Domino Recording Company in 1997.

== Critical reception ==
Keith Farley of AllMusic gave the album 3 stars out of 5, saying, "A focus on warped guitar noise and the odd, untraceable samples place Ghost in similar territory to earlier Third Eye material, though 'Corpses as Bedmates' and 'The Star's Gone Out' reveal a few interesting drum'n'bass patterns." Peter Margasak of Chicago Reader said, "Elliot channels in dense, often harsh, slate-gray soundscapes that frequently rumble with hyperactive rhythm programming." Mike Goldsmith of the NME gave the album 7 out of 10, saying "Uncomfortable bedfellows for sure, and hardly easy listening, but apparently that's the idea. Whether these are meditations on the past or (somewhat more worryingly) visions of the future, 'Ghost' remains deliciously spooky stuff and the precursor of hopefully stranger things to come. Enter at your peril".

== Track listing ==
No.	Title	Length
1.	"What to Do but Cry?"	6:59
2.	"Corpses as Bedmates"	8:52
3.	"The Star's Gone Out"	6:05
4.	"The Out Sound from Way In"	5:57
5.	"I've Seen the Light and It's Dark"	8:01
6.	"Ghosts..."	7:21
7.	"Donald Crowhurst"	4:18
