= Amp (band) =

English electronic space rock band

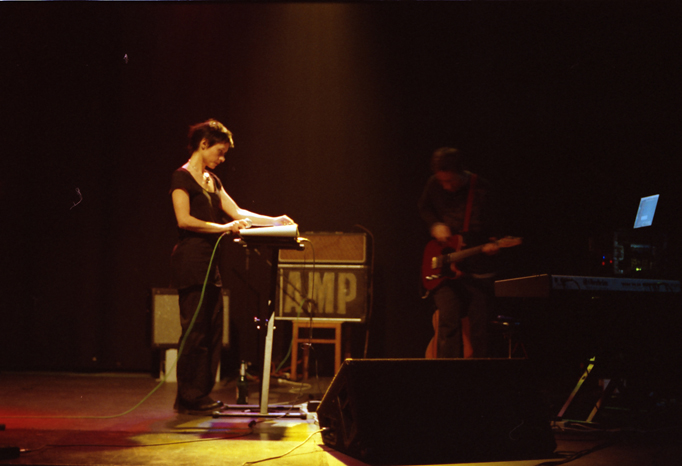

Background information
- Origin: London, England
- Genres: Space rock Ambient; Electronic; Post-Rock; Experimental; Shoegaze
- Years active: 1991–present
- Labels: Ampbase, Kranky, Space age Recordings, Very Friendly, Darla
- Website: www.ampbase.net

Amp are an English electronic space rock band formed in London by Richard F. Walker (also known as Richard Amp) in 1991, after collaborating with David Pearce of Flying Saucer Attack on The Secret Garden and the Distance projects. Amp recorded the audio cassette/short story Green Sky Blue Tree with Ray Dickaty (subsequently a member of Moonshake and Spiritualized, amongst others), while Walker was studying at the Royal College of Art in 1992. After a two-year break, Amp resurfaced with French vocalist Karine Charff, Bristol experimentalists Matt Elliott (Flying Saucer Attack and later The Third Eye Foundation), and Matt Jones (Crescent) on board. MC Strong in 'The Great Indie Discography' described Amp as "Occupying musical territory somewhere between shoegazing and the Bristol 'Trip Hop' sound, AMP had created a work of sweeping soundscapes, echoing ambience and waves of feedback."

Jones and Elliott left to pursue their own projects by 1997. Since then, Amp has worked with Charff and Walker and a succession of collaborators, including:

- Guy Cooper and Gareth Mitchell of The Secret Garden, who worked with Amp on Astralmoonbeamprojections (1997)
- Robert Hampson (Loop/Main), who worked as producer on Stenorette (1998)
- Olivier Gauthier, on Stenorette and L'Amour Invisible (2001)
- Jan Zert, on L'Amour Invisible (2001)
- Marc Challans on US (2005)
- Jon Hamilton (aka Drumm Chimp) on Live At Corsica Studios (2013)
- Ray Dickaty, on Green Sky Blue Tree (1992), US (2005), Transmissions (Phase 1) (2005), All of Yesterday Tomorrow (2007)
- Donald Ross Skinner (a collaborator of Julian Cope and former member of Baba Looey), on US (2005), Motus (2008), Oetinger Villa (2009), Outposts (2011)

Walker has also released solo records as "Richard Amp" and "Amp Studio".

== Discography ==
- Green Sky Blue Tree (1992)
- Sirenes (1996)
- Astralmoonbeamprojections (1997)
- Perception (1997) Darla US, Ampbase UK
- Passe Present (1997)
- Stenorette (1998)
- VV.AA. – A Tribute to Spacemen 3 (1998)
- Saint Cecilia Sinsemilla (2000)
- L'Amour Invisible (2001)
- US (2005)
- Transmissions (Phase 1) (2005)
- All of Yesterday Tomorrow (2007)
- Motus (2008)
- Oetinger Villa (2009)
- Outposts (2011)
- Live at Corsica Studios (2013)
- Switched on And Live (2016)
- Q Factors (A Mixtape) (2017)
- Entangled Time (2018)
- Echoesfromtheholocene (2023)
- Ambient Love Darkness Share (2025)
- Isotropic Beacons (2026)
