= The Mess We Made =

Studio album by Matt Elliott
- Released: 21 April 2003 (UK); May 13, 2003 (US)
- Length: 52:50
- Label: Domino (UK); Merge (US)
- Producer: Matt Elliott

Matt Elliott chronology
I Poo Poo on Your JuJu (2001)	The Mess We Made (2003)	OuMuPo (2004)

Professional ratings
Review scores
Source	Rating
Allmusic	4/5 stars
PlayLouder	(favourable)
Pitchfork Media	(7.6/10)
PopMatters	(favourable)
Prefix Magazine	(8.0/10)
Stylus Magazine	(B)

The Mess We Made is an album by British electronic musician Matt Elliott, released in the UK by Domino Records and in the United States by Merge Records in 2003 (see 2003 in music). The album was Elliott's first to be released under his given name, having retired the Third Eye Foundation name with 2001's I Poo Poo on Your JuJu.

== Track listing ==
1. "Let Us Break" – 7:00
2. "Also Ran" – 6:25
3. "The Dog Beneath the Skin" – 7:50
4. "The Mess We Made" – 5:26
5. "Cotard's Syndrome" – 8:43
6. "The Sinking Ship Song" – 7:20
7. "End" – 2:52
8. "Forty Days" – 7:11
