= The Blossom Filled Streets =

Studio album by Movietone
- Released: July 10, 2000
- Recorded: 1999
- Studios: Bristol, England
- Genres: Indie rock, post-rock, ambient pop
- Length: 40:30
- Labels: Domino; Drag City

Movietone chronology
Day and Night (1997)	The Blossom Filled Streets (2000)	The Sand and the Stars (2003)

The Blossom Filled Streets is the third studio album by English post-rock band Movietone. It was released on 10 July 2000 by Domino Recording Company and Drag City.

== Background ==
Several tracks on the album were considered personal to vocalist Kate Wright, and they were inspired by the deaths of individuals significant to her. Consisting of nine songs, the album was recorded in Bristol in 1999 and has a runtime of over forty minutes. "Star Ruby" and "Seagulls/Bass" were recorded at the lengths of around two minutes, while the other songs were between four and seven minutes. It succeeds the band's second album, Day and Night, released three years prior.

== Reception ==
Professional ratings
Review scores
Source	Rating
AllMusic	4/5 stars
NME	3.5/5 stars
Pitchfork	8.6/10

Pitchfork assigned The Blossom Filled Streets a rating of 8.6 out of ten, referring to it as "a lost indie rock gem from 2000, an ethereal and luminescent highlight of the underground Bristol scene."

Eamon Sweeney of Hot Press complimented the band's use of piano and woodwind. He opined that the song "Seagulls/Bass" is proof of the band's airiness, and praised Wright's vocals on the opening track, "Hydra".

NME, scored the album three and a half stars out of five, remarking, "Everything feels tremendously loose, as pianos and woodwinds circle indolently around drumming that could, in a gentler world, be called jazzy."

AllMusic rated it four stars and stated, "It may be overly simplistic to say that a band called Movietone makes music that sounds like the soundtrack to melancholy film scenes under gaslight and stars, but they do make that music, and its filmic richness makes this album a most unique treat."

== Composition ==
"Hydra" opens with oscillating drone created by the viola and clarinet, and Matt Jones' drumming on the song was noted as "loose and wild". Rock music critic Mark Richardson of Pitchfork and The Wall Street Journal observed that several songs from the album resemble "disconnected pairs", comparing "1930s Beach House" with the opening track, "Star Ruby" with the title track, and "Porthcurno" with the closing track, and noting the other three songs, "Year Ending", "Seagulls/Bass", and "In a Marine Light" as instrumentals that convey the ambience of a deteriorating house in Bristol, where several of the band members lived.

== Track listing ==
The Blossom Filled Streets track listing
No.	Title	Length
1.	"Hydra"	4:56
2.	"Star Ruby"	2:06
3.	"1930's Beach House"	6:10
4.	"Year Ending"	6:35
5.	"The Blossom Filled Streets"	4:11
6.	"Porthcurno"	4:46
7.	"Seagulls/Bass"	1:53
8.	"In a Marine Light"	5:40
9.	"Night in These Rooms"	4:13
Total length:		40:30

== Personnel ==
Credits for The Blossom Filled Streets adapted from AllMusic.

- Florence Lovegrove – viola
- Kate Wright – bass, acoustic guitar, piano, vocals
- Matt Jones – drums, piano, string bass
- Rachel Brook – bass, clarinet
- Sam Jones – bass, electric guitar
