= Harmony of the Spheres (album) =

Compilation album by Various artists
- Released: November 1996
- Recorded: July 1994 – January 1996
- Genre: Experimental rock, psychedelic rock, space rock, drone
- Length: 124:25
- Label: Drunken Fish

Professional ratings
Review scores
Source	Rating
AllMusic	4.5/5 stars
Exclaim!	(positive)

Harmony of the Spheres is a various artists compilation album, released in November 1996 by Drunken Fish Records.

== Track listing ==
Disc one
No.	Title	Artist	Length
1.	"Sangh Seriatim"	Bardo Pond	22:01
2.	"Since When (One)"	Flying Saucer Attack	6:22
3.	"Since When (Two)"	Flying Saucer Attack	7:02
4.	"Since When (Three)"	Flying Saucer Attack	2:35
5.	"Since When (Four)"	Flying Saucer Attack	9:00
6.	"22:30"	Jessamine	23:32

Disc two
No.	Title	Artist	Length
1.	"Fantasia on a Theme by Sandy Bull"	Roy Montgomery	20:50
2.	"Flames"	Loren Mazzacane Connors	1:51
3.	"The Gathering"	Loren Mazzacane Connors	2:24
4.	"Revolt!"	Loren Mazzacane Connors	7:41
5.	"Fand (A Tear)"	Loren Mazzacane Connors	1:27
6.	"Naked in Our Deathskins"	Charalambides	19:40

== Personnel ==
Adapted from the Harmony of the Spheres liner notes.

- John Golden – mastering
- Beth Nuber – design

== Release history ==
Region	Date	Label	Format	Catalog
United States	1996	Drunken Fish	LP	DFR-25
United States	1999	Drunken Fish	CD	DFR-50
