= Instrumentals 2015 =

Studio album by Flying Saucer Attack
- Released: 17 July 2015
- Genre: Post-rock; shoegaze; space rock; psychedelia
- Length: 57:03
- Label: Domino

Flying Saucer Attack chronology
Mirror (2000)	Instrumentals 2015 (2015)

Instrumentals 2015 is the fifth studio album by the English experimental space rock band Flying Saucer Attack, released through Domino Recording Company on 17 July 2015.

== Musical style ==
Instrumentals 2015 has been categorised by critics as post-rock, shoegaze, space rock, and psychedelia. Entirely devoid of vocals, the album consists of 15 tracks composed and performed solely by David Pearce using guitar, which he manipulates to emulate a range of sonic textures. The instrument evokes comparisons to church bells, synthesisers, stringed instruments, and natural phenomena such as steam and waves. Multi-tracked guitars are employed to generate complex, layered soundscapes.

The album incorporates elements of electronica, folk, lo-fi, ambient, and drone music. These include references to "blossoming dronescapes" and "aerated drone[s]", and several tracks extend to nearly ten minutes in length. The production retains a lo-fi quality consistent with Flying Saucer Attack's earlier work, recorded at home using CD-R and tape, resulting in a textured, grainy sound with audible noise. The album's aesthetic has been described as possessing a "faded" and "crackly" atmosphere.

== Critical reception ==
Professional ratings
Aggregate scores
Source	Rating
Metacritic	76/100
Review scores
Source	Rating
AllMusic	4/5 stars
Clash	8/10
Exclaim!	6/10
The Guardian	5/5 stars
The Line of Best Fit	9/10
NME	7/10
Pitchfork	6.8/10
PopMatters	9/10
Tiny Mix Tapes	4/5 marks
Under the Radar	7/10

According to the review aggregator Metacritic, Instrumentals 2015 received "generally favorable reviews" based on a weighted average score of 76 out of 100 from 19 critic scores.

=== Accolades ===
Year-end lists for Instrumentals 2015
Publication	List	Rank	Ref.
The Wire	Top 50 Releases of 2015	49	

== Track listing ==
Instrumentals 2015 track listing
No.	Title	Length
1.	"Instrumental 1"	0:58
2.	"Instrumental 2"	2:57
3.	"Instrumental 3"	6:26
4.	"Instrumental 4"	4:10
5.	"Instrumental 5"	1:38
6.	"Instrumental 6"	1:22
7.	"Instrumental 7"	6:55
8.	"Instrumental 8"	1:14
9.	"Instrumental 9"	4:07
10.	"Instrumental 10"	2:51
11.	"Instrumental 11"	4:14
12.	"Instrumental 12"	0:41
13.	"Instrumental 13"	1:53
14.	"Instrumental 14"	7:48
15.	"Instrumental 15"	9:41
Total length:		57:03

== Charts ==
Chart performance for Instrumentals 2015
Chart (2015)	Peak position
UK Independent Album Breakers (OCC)	13
UK Official Record Store (OCC)	14
