= The Sand and the Stars =

The Sand and The Stars

Studio album by Movietone
- Released: 4 November 2003
- Recorded: 2003
- Genres: Post-rock; indie folk
- Length: 39:19
- Label: Drag City

Movietone chronology
The Blossom Filled Streets (2000)	The Sand and The Stars (2003)

Professional ratings
Review scores
Source	Rating
Allmusic	link
Drowned in Sound	(7/10)
Pitchfork Media	(8.0/10)
Uncut	4/5 stars

The Sand and The Stars is an album by the Bristol-based band Movietone. It was partly recorded on a beach in Cornwall Its intention was to sound 'like a jazz record being played from across the bay'. This was inspired by a review of their previous album ('the blossom filled streets'), which had described their music that way.

== Critical reception ==
In 2015, upon including "Ocean Song" in their "Pitchfork Essentials" list "Harder Shade of Dark: The Sound of Bristol Post-Rock", Pitchfork Media described The Sand and the Stars as "a musical secret ripe for rediscovery, lying there gathering digital dust until its moment finally arrives."

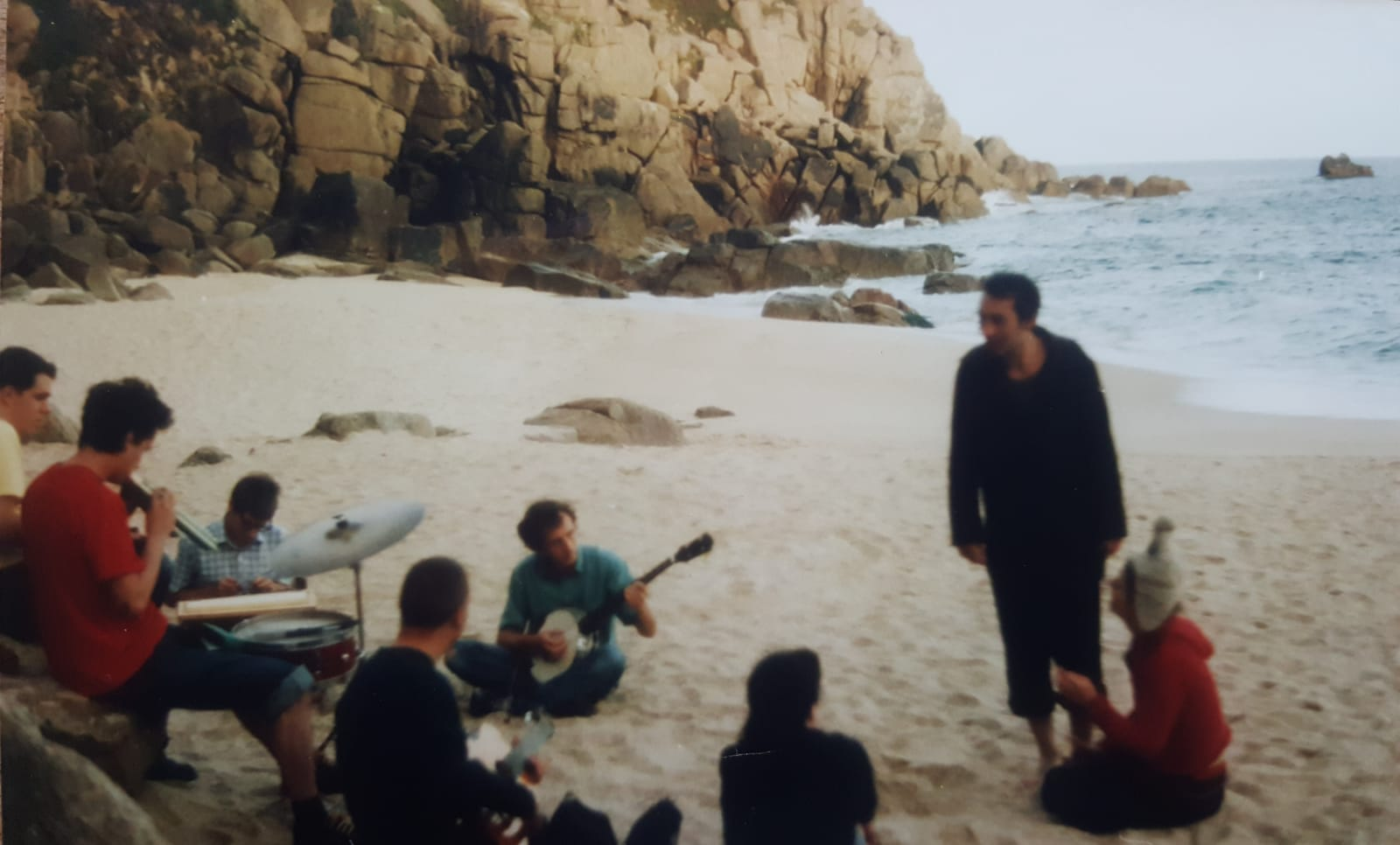
Movietone recording 'the sand and the stars' songs on the Porthchapel beach, Land's End, Cornwall. Taken by Michal Davies

== Track listing ==
1. "The Sand and the Stars" — 2:43
  - Kate Wright - vocals, guitar, lyrics
  - Matt Jones - guitar
  - Tom Cops - piano
  - Annie Wright - paws
2. "Ocean Song" — 5:02
  - Kate Wright - vocals, guitar, lyrics
  - George McKenzie - tenor saxophone
  - Sam Jones - guitar
  - Tom Cops - banjo
  - Chris Cole - Fender Rhodes electric piano, trumpet
  - Rachel Coe - bass
  - Matt Jones - drums

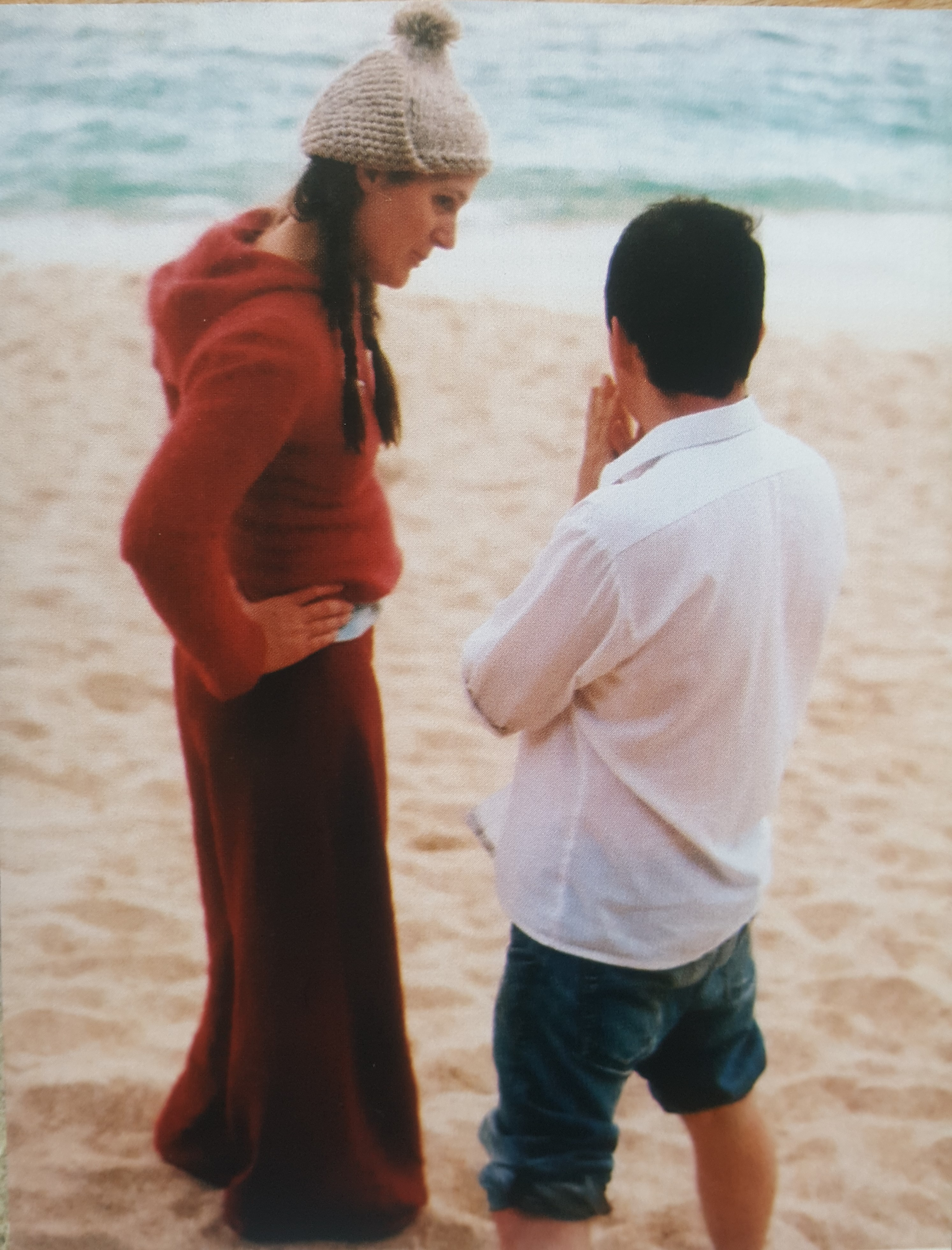
Movietone 'the sand and the stars recordings, Kate Wright and Michal Davies, Porthchapel beach. Taken by Tom Cops

1. "In Mexico" — 5:00
  - Kate Wright - guitar, vocals, lyrics
  - Rachel Coe - guitar, vocals, lyrics
  - Matt Jones - banjo
  - Chris Cole - double bass, cello
  - Sam Jones - drums
2. "Pale Tracks" — 4:06
  - Sam Jones - guitar, lead vocals, wine glasses, lyrics
  - Chris Cole - accordion, wine glasses
  - Rachel Coe - piano, backing vocals
  - Katie Wright - cello, backing vocals
  - Matt Jones - drums, backing vocals

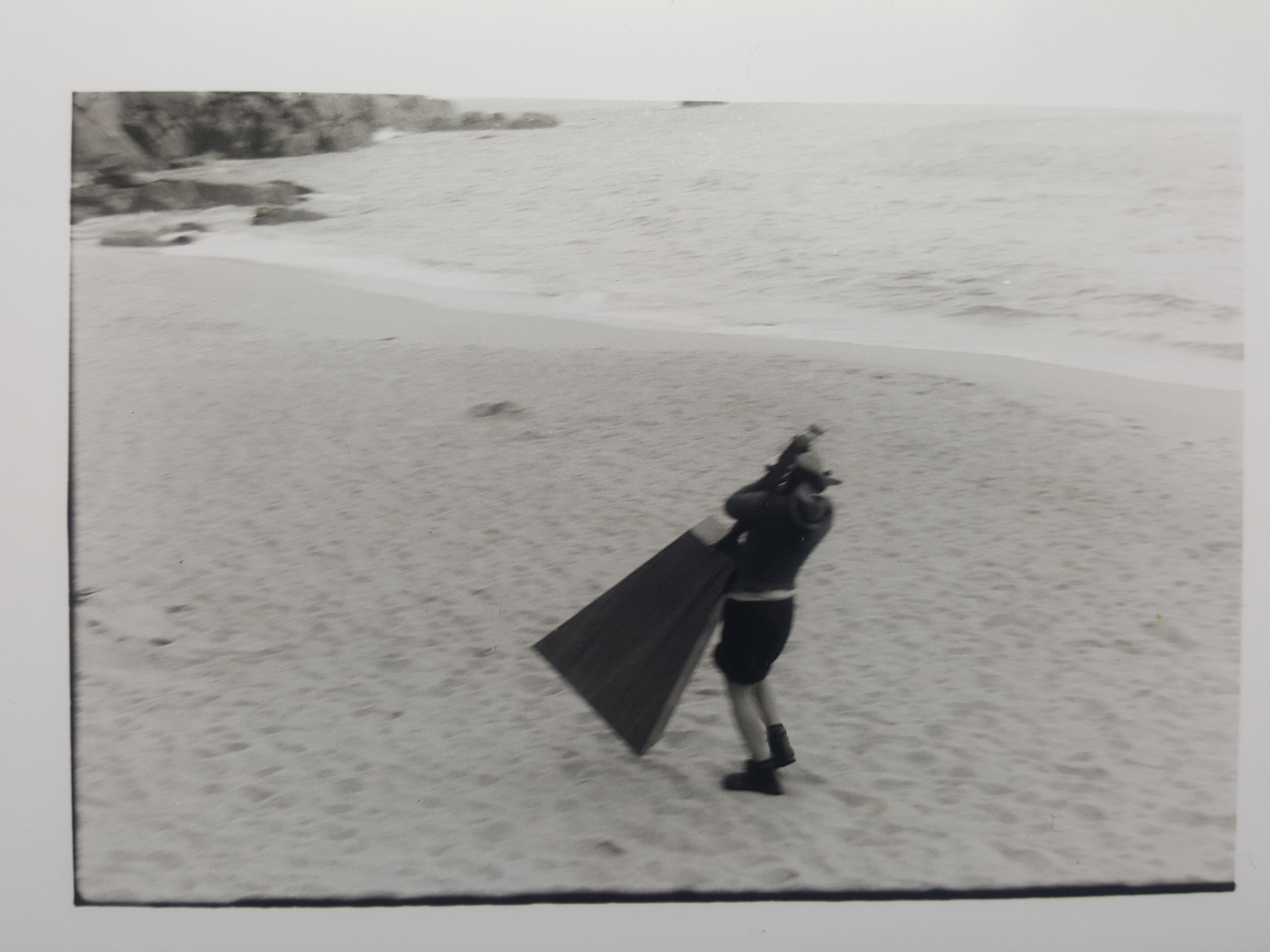
Movietone 'the sand and the stars' beach recordings. Kate Wright carrying the double bass on Porthchapel beach, for the song 'Beach Samba'. Taken by Tom Cops

1. "Let Night In" — 3:52
  - Rachel Coe - vocals, piano, clarinet, lyrics
  - John Coe - guitar, lyrics
2. "We Rode On" — 3:48

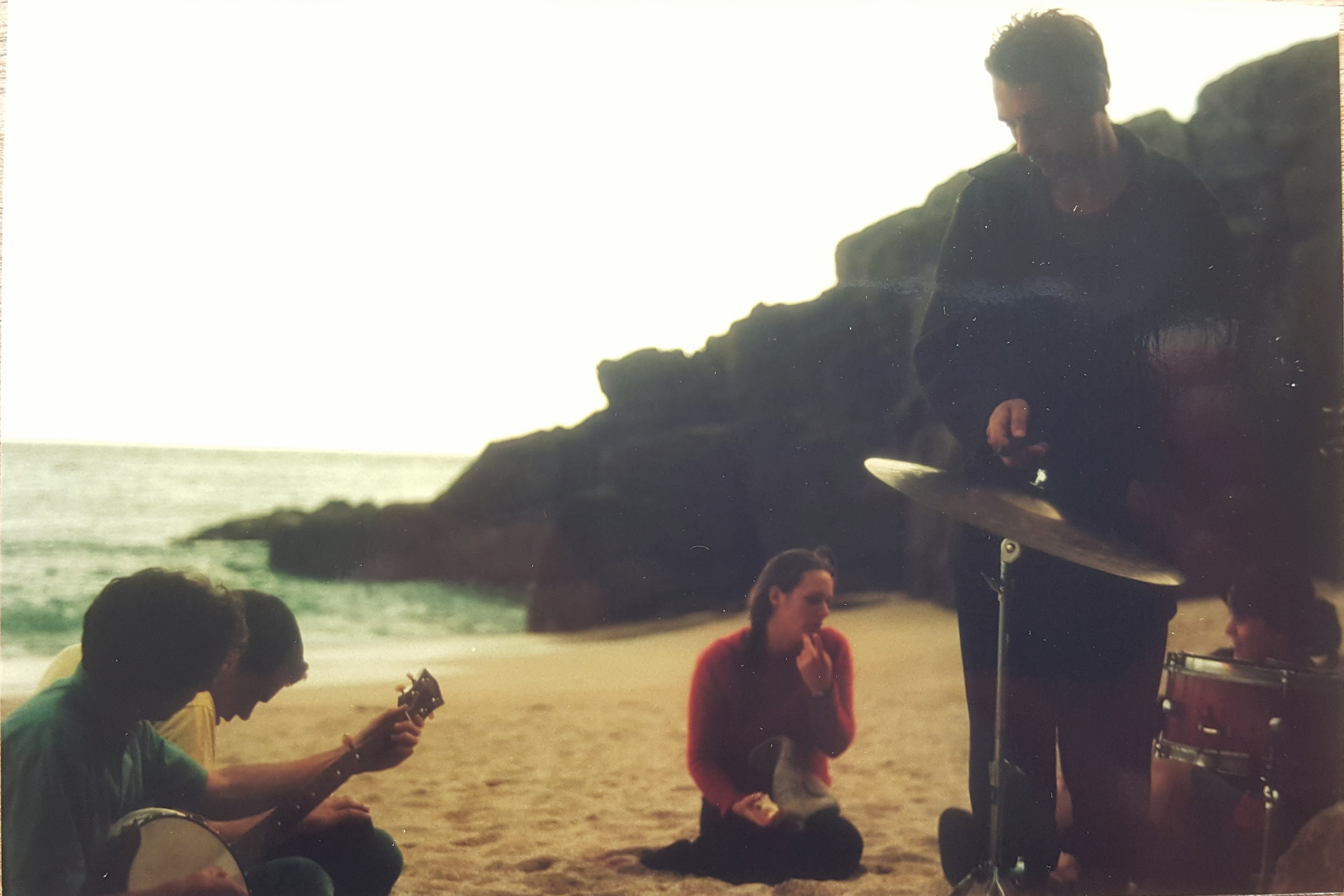
Movietone 'the sand and the stars' beach recordings, Porthchapel beach, Land's End, Cornwall. L-R Sam Jones, Tom Cops, Kate Wright, Matt Jones, Rachel Coe. Taken by Michal Davies

  - Kate Wright - vocals, guitar, lyrics
  - Michael Davies - trumpet
  - Lisa Brook - clarinet
  - Rachel Coe - clarinet
  - George McKenzie - bass saxophone
  - Tom Cops - banjo
  - John Coe - guitar
  - Sam Jones - guitar
  - Chris Cole - cello
  - Matt Jones - lyrics
1. "Snow is Falling" — 4:25
  - Kate Wright - guitar, lead vocals, lyrics
  - Rachel Coe - clarinet, backing vocals
  - Chris Cole - cello, backing vocals
  - Matt Jones - double bass, backing vocals
  - Sam Jones - drums, backing vocals
2. "Not Even Close" — 1:47
  - Kate Wright - guitar
  - Sam Jones - guitar
  - Rachel Coe - organ
  - Matt Jones - drums
3. "Red Earth" — 4:08
  - Kate Wright - cello, vocals, lyrics
  - Matt Jones - drums, vocals, organ, lyrics
  - George McKenzie - tenor saxophone
  - Sam Jones - guitar
  - Tom Cops - banjo
4. "Beach Samba" — 2:57
  - Michael Davies - trumpet
  - Lisa Brook - clarinet
  - Rachel Coe - clarinet
  - George McKenzie - tenor saxophone
  - John Coe - guitar
  - Sam Jones - guitar
  - Tom Cops - banjo
  - Kate Wright - double bass, vocals, lyrics
  - Matt Jones - drums, lyrics
5. "Near Marconi's Hut" — 1:25
  - Kate Wright - guitar, vocals

== Release history ==
Year	Label	Format	Catalog #
2003	Drag City	CD	260
2003	Drag City	LP	000260
2003	Domino	CD	131
2003	British Domino	LP	398113311
