= You Guys Kill Me =

Studio album by The Third Eye Foundation
- Released: 20 October 1998
- Genre: Electronic
- Length: 45:16
- Label: Domino Recording Company
- Producer: Matt Elliott

The Third Eye Foundation chronology
Ghost (1997)	You Guys Kill Me (1998)	Little Lost Soul (2000)

Singles from You Guys Kill Me
- 1. "In Bristol with a Pistol" Released: 1999

You Guys Kill Me is a studio album by Matt Elliott, released under the moniker The Third Eye Foundation. It was originally released on Domino Recording Company on 20 October 1998.

== Critical reception ==
Professional ratings
Review scores
Source	Rating
AllMusic	4.5/5 stars
Entertainment Weekly	A−
NME	8/10
Pitchfork	6.5/10

Will Hermes of Entertainment Weekly gave the album a grade of "A−," calling it "a dense weave of scissored rhythms and slithering tape loops that reads like a soundtrack to some great lost surrealist film." John Bush of AllMusic gave the album 4.5 stars out of 5, saying, "The beats and effects Matt Elliott concocted aren't incredibly original (there's the sewing-machine Brazilian bossa shuffle and the downbeat from Boogie Down Productions' "Bridge Is Over," along with various effects including howling dogs, dark crackly strings and metallic), but the slice-and-dice production, along with creative processing, transforms them into revelatory darkside symphonies."

NME named it the 36th best album of 1998.

== Track listing ==
No.	Title	Length
1.	"A Galaxy of Scars"	6:55
2.	"For All the Brothers and Sisters"	4:14
3.	"There's a Fight at the End of the Tunnel"	4:39
4.	"An Even Harder Shade of Dark"	8:35
5.	"Lions Writing the Bible"	1:59
6.	"No Dove No Covenant"	4:55
7.	"I'm Sick and Tired of Being Sick and Tired"	4:39
8.	"That Would Be Exhibiting the Same Weak Traits"	6:07
9.	"In Bristol with a Pistol"	3:03
Total length:		45:16
