= Flying Saucer Attack (album) =

Studio album by Flying Saucer Attack
- Released: November 1993
- Recorded: May – August 1993
- Studio: Feedback; Rocker's
- Genre: Shoegazing; lo-fi; post-rock; noise rock
- Length: 50:18
- Label: FSA; VHF
- Producer: Flying Saucer Attack

Flying Saucer Attack chronology
Flying Saucer Attack (1993)	Further (1995)

Flying Saucer Attack is the debut album by the English band Flying Saucer Attack. It was released through the band's FSA Records label in November 1993, and by VHF Records in the United States in 1994.

== Musical style ==
Founding David Pearce has described the album's music "rural psychedelia", which was also an alternate title for the album. Kieron Tyler of The Arts Desk found that the album exemplified the more "diffuse" direction that shoegazing music had taken by 1993, after the genre's initial wave of popularity. AllMusic editor Ned Raggett placed the album in the context of its contemporaneous scene, writing that it "crystallized an incipient 1990s underground as in thrall to folk music as to feedback blasts and Krautrock influences." Record Collector critic Mike Goldsmith also heard influences of "jazz, noise and Kiwi indie" in the music. "If any one thing could be singled out about the album," Raggett writes, "it's the continual contrast between Pearce's soft, reflective singing, often sunk deep into the overall mix and treated with heavy-duty echo, and his often tremendous guitar work, electric squalls, and drones piled atop one another." He noted the "initial comparisons" made to My Bloody Valentine, but found them to be "misplaced – it's a consciously different style employing some similar elements, but with notably varying results."

The tracks "Popol Vuh 1" and "Popol Vuh 2" were "open tips of the hat" to the German experimental band Popol Vuh. Goldsmith described the two "drone instrumentals" as "post-rock guitarscapes" built around "the tribal percussion" that would be further explored by Matt Elliott, who plays on the album, in his work as The Third Eye Foundation.

Gravenhurst's Nick Talbot, writing in The Quietus, highlighted a sense of romanticism in the song titles and lyrics, and Pearce's use of "a pagan semiology to paint an escapist fantasy." "And buried deep – often very deep," he writes, "beneath the haunting swirls lie naive pop gems as perfectly formed as those on Ride's early EPs."

== Recording ==
Like much of their early output, the band utilised a low-fidelity approach in recording Flying Saucer Attack. This quality was highlighted by Nick Talbot, who wrote that the "unprecedentedly noisy" album "took lo-fi to hitherto uncharted depths by making technologically compromised bedroom amateurism an essential part of its unique, rural psychedelia." He wrote that Flying Saucer Attack "was also created by sonic processes which to this day remain partly shrouded in mystery. The outfit's diffident visionary Dave Pearce spoke of his obsession with Popol Vuh, and lacking access to orchestral arrangements he attempted emulation with whatever he had to hand. In particular... he found a way of emulating a choral ensemble by turning down the tone dial of his electric guitar and gently drawing a screwdriver crossways against the strings, through a distortion and a delay unit." Talbot also noted the incorporation of "squalling clarinets, mesmerically delayed tribal percussion and pitch-shifted howls and moans, appearing and disappearing in a rainstorm of autodidactic chaos."

== Release ==
Flying Saucer Attack was first released in November 1993 on vinyl via the band's FSA Records label. In 1994, VHF Records released the CD version of the album in the US. The latter label released an mp3 version of the album online in 2017, whilst also reissuing it on gatefold vinyl. The same year, Domino Recording Company reissued the album on both CD and 180-g vinyl.

== Reception ==
Professional ratings
Review scores
Source	Rating
AllMusic	4/5 stars
Record Collector	4/5 stars
Uncut	8/10

AllMusic's Ned Raggett wrote that compared to their later albums, "Flying Saucer Attack sets more of an immediately consistent mood – some numbers aside, the dreamy singing, the seemingly straightforward guitar parts that get more involved the more one listens, and more continue from track to track, generally speaking. The end results, though, are more than worth it." The tracks "A Silent Tide", "Wish" and the Suede cover "The Drowners" were picked as highlights.

Mike Goldsmith praised the album in Record Collector, writing that while "1995's Further is where it's really at [...] their debut shows that in 1993, Bristol was way, way out west." Fact writer Rich Hanscomb included Flying Saucer Attack in his 2009 list of the 20 best post-rock albums, describing it as "post-rock of a very British kind: damp, sodden, muffled. Simultaneously familiar and otherworldly."

== Track listing ==
All tracks are written by Flying Saucer Attack, except where noted.

No.	Title	Writer(s)	Length
1.	"My Dreaming Hill"		6:12
2.	"A Silent Tide"		3:48
3.	"Moonset"	Flying Saucer Attack; 3ef	4:25
4.	"Make Me Dream"		4:25
5.	"Wish"		5:23
6.	"Popol Vuh 2"		5:00
7.	"The Drowners"	Bernard Butler; Brett Anderson	4:34
8.	"Still"		1:50
9.	"Popol Vuh 1"		10:18
10.	"The Season Is Ours"		4:18
Total length:			50:18

== Personnel ==
Credits for Flying Saucer Attack adapted from album liner notes.

- Flying Saucer Attack – instruments
- Rocker – drum programming, bass programming, computer
- The Third Eye – bongos, clarinet
- James – photography
- Tasmin – back cover painting
- Khoi Vinh – design
