= Semtex (disambiguation) =

Semtex is a general-purpose plastic explosive.

Semtex may also refer to:

- Semtex (album), a 1996 album by The Third Eye Foundation
- Semtex (drink), a taurine-containing energy drink manufactured in the Czech Republic
- DJ Semtex, a BBC hip-hop disc jockey and producer from the UK
- Paul "Semtex" Daley (b. 1983), a British mixed martial artist
- Semtex (anti-slip covering), a type of gritty cement-like compound used on the decks of Royal Navy ships
