= Little Lost Soul =

Studio album by The Third Eye Foundation
- Released: 8 February 2000
- Genre: Electronic
- Length: 43:38
- Label: Domino Recording Company
- Producer: Matt Elliott

The Third Eye Foundation chronology
| You Guys Kill Me (1998) | Little Lost Soul (2000) | I Poo Poo on Your JuJu (2001) |

Singles from Little Lost Soul
- 1. "What Is It with You" Released: 2000

Professional ratings
Review scores
| Source | Rating |
|---|---|
| AllMusic | 4.5/5 stars |
| Almost Cool | 7.75/10 |
| Pitchfork | 5.9/10 |
| Spin | 8/10 |

Little Lost Soul is a studio album by Matt Elliott, released under the moniker The Third Eye Foundation. It was originally released on Domino Recording Company in 2000.

It peaked at number 102 on the CMJ Top 200 chart.

== Critical reception ==
Jason Kane of AllMusic gave the album 4.5 stars out of 5, calling it The Third Eye Foundation's "most consistent" album to date. He added, "The percussion is meticulously constructed; each beat is placed for a purpose and new rhythms are exposed upon repeated listens." Kristen Sage Rockermann of Pitchfork gave the album a 5.8 out of 10, saying, "On Little Lost Soul, Elliot has pointlessly sugared the pill with smoother production, and as a result, the album lacks the power of the dreamworlds its eerie textures allude to."

== Track listing ==
| No. | Title | Length |
|---|---|---|
| 1. | "I've Lost That Loving Feline" | 4:31 |
| 2. | "What Is It with You" | 4:21 |
| 3. | "Stone Cold Said So" | 6:06 |
| 4. | "Half a Tiger" | 7:10 |
| 5. | "Lost" | 10:54 |
| 6. | "Are You Still a Cliché?" | 1:57 |
| 7. | "Goddamnit You've Got to Be Kind" | 8:39 |

== Personnel ==
Credits adapted from liner notes.

- Matt Elliott – writing, performance, production
- Uncle Vania – original artwork, photography
- Matt Cooper – sleeve manipulation
