= Day and Night (Movietone album) =

Studio album by Movietone
- Released: November 2, 1997
- Studios: Albany Centre, Café Mono; "in houses"
- Length: 39:10
- Labels: Domino; Drag City

Movietone chronology
Movietone (1995)	Day and Night (1997)	The Blossom Filled Streets (2000)

Day and Night is the second studio album by English band Movietone. It was released on November 2, 1997 as their first album on Domino Recording Company and Drag City. Domino reissued the album in October 2026, featuring the bonus track "Phonograph Space".

== Background and composition ==
Day and Night was recorded at the Albany Centre, located in Café Mono, and "in houses". Ned Raggett, writing for AllMusic, described Day and Night as "a continued, extended dream of darkly attractive (but not dour) full-band mood-outs", and compared it to Nick Drake's Pink Moon, "late-period" Talk Talk, and "moody '60s spy movie [music]". Stephen Thompson, writing for The A.V. Club in 2002, said Day and Night incorporates a sound palette of "slow, languid acoustics, with [...] spare pianos, acoustic guitars, and clicking noises".

== Reception ==
On the occasion of its reissue, Chris DeVille for Stereogum noted that it would potentially make Movietone "become the next Duster."

Professional ratings
Review scores
Source	Rating
AllMusic	4/5 stars

== Track listing ==
No.	Title	Length
1.	"Sun Drawing"	3:57
2.	"Blank Like Snow"	2:40
3.	"Useless Landscape"	5:01
4.	"Summer"	7:14
5.	"Night of the Acacias"	5:45
6.	"Noche Marina"	4:47
7.	"The Crystallisation of Salt at Night"	9:46
Total length:		39:10

2026 reissue bonus track
No.	Title	Length
8.	"Phonograph Space"	2:12
Total length:		41:22
