= In Version =

Studio album by The Third Eye Foundation
- Released: 1996
- Genre: Electronic, ambient, noise
- Label: Linda's Strange Vacation
- Producer: Matt Elliott

The Third Eye Foundation chronology
In Version (1996)	Ghost (1997)

In Version is the second album released by Matt Elliott under the name The Third Eye Foundation. It was released in 1996 on Matt Elliott's record label, Linda's Strange Vacation. It is composed of remixes of songs originally by other artists. It features remixes of the songs of artists AMP, Crescent, Hood and Flying Saucer Attack.

== Track listing ==
No.	Title	Length
1.	"Eternity" (I And I And Eye And Eye And Eye Version)	4:33
2.	"Short Wave Dub"	7:57
3.	"Superconstellation"	13:09
4.	"Eyes"	5:21
5.	"Way Out Like David Bowman"	17:34
