= Reggae Maranhão Museum =

Coordinates: 2°31′44″S 44°18′20″W

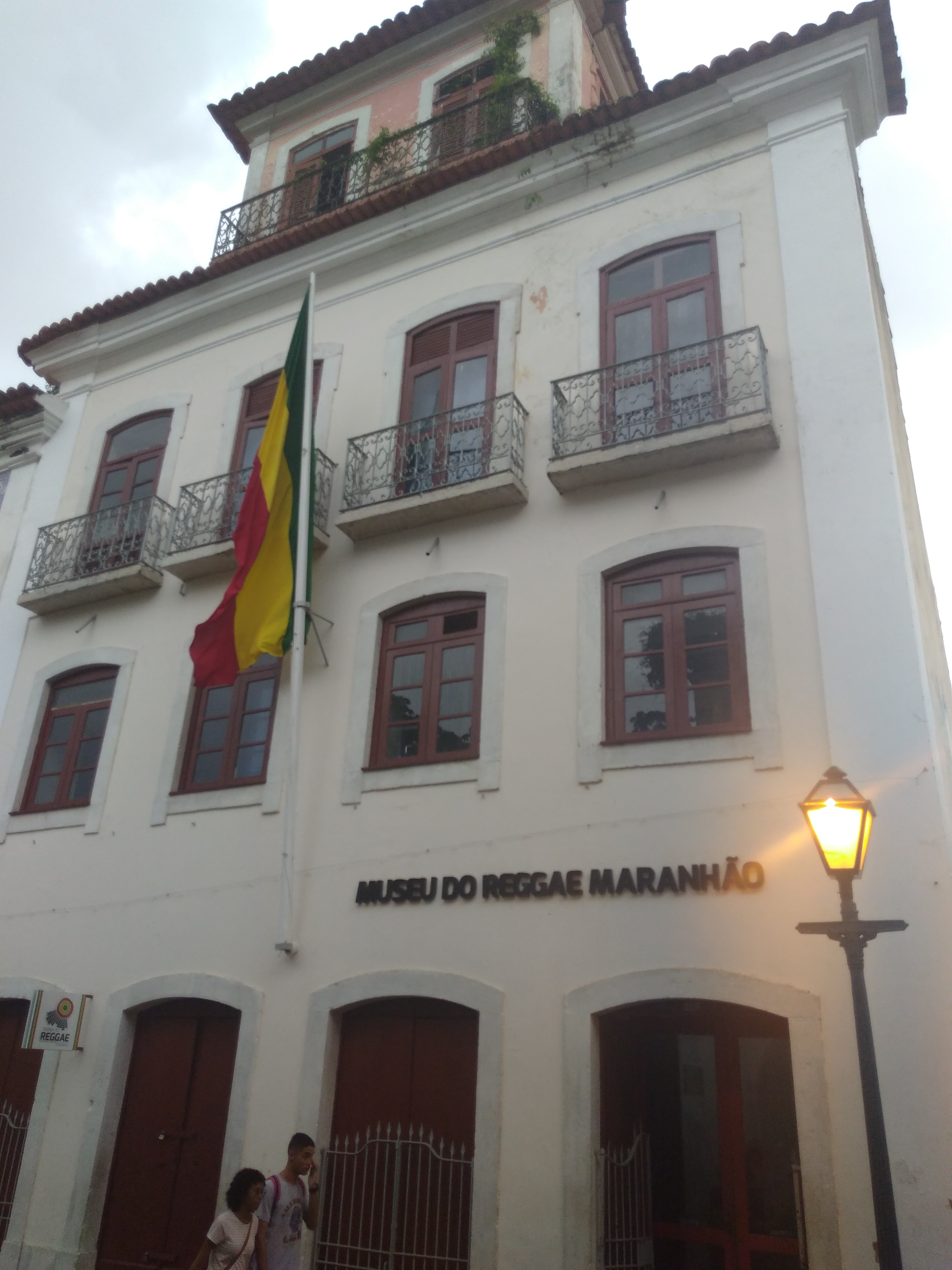
Reggae Maranhão Museum

The Reggae Maranhão Museum (Portuguese: Museu do Reggae Maranhão) is the first reggae-themed museum outside of Jamaica and the second in the world, in the Historic Center of São Luís in Brazil.

== History ==
It was founded on January 18, 2018. The museum aims to materialize the memories of the Jamaican rhythm that conquered the state of Maranhão.

São Luís is also considered the capital of reggae in Brazil, having received the nickname of Brazilian Jamaica. The city has more than 200 radiolas, a name given to sound teams formed by DJs and stereos with dozens of powerful amplifiers stacked.

Several narratives seek to explain how reggae was incorporated into the local culture. According to some reports, since the 1970s, some people have been able to capture short-wave Caribbean radio, due to geographical proximity. Later, tourists, emigrants, and sailors in the city's port zone would also influence the introduction of the rhythm in the state.

In the 80s and 90s, reggae shows spread throughout the outskirts of São Luís. In 1984, the first reggae radio program appeared, and later the first local television programs, such as the Conexão Jamaica, of the TV Difusora. The first local bands, like the Tribo de Jah, also appeared.

The reggae played in São Luís presented different characteristics in relation to Jamaican reggae, seeking a more romantic and sensual rhythm. The way of dancing is also typical of the region. Some researchers argue that the rhythm style is similar to local folk rhythms, such as bumba-meu-boi and Tambor de Crioula. Some songs are called "melô" or "pedra" (stone, in Portuguese), when they become local successes.

In the Historic Center of São Luís, there is a tourist tour in which a guide leads the visitors to places that represent the history of reggae in the city, with the presentation of dace. Reggae Square, in the Historic Center, also hosts musical attractions.

In the first year of operation, the museum received 50 thousand visitors, of which 20 thousand were tourists.

== Collection ==
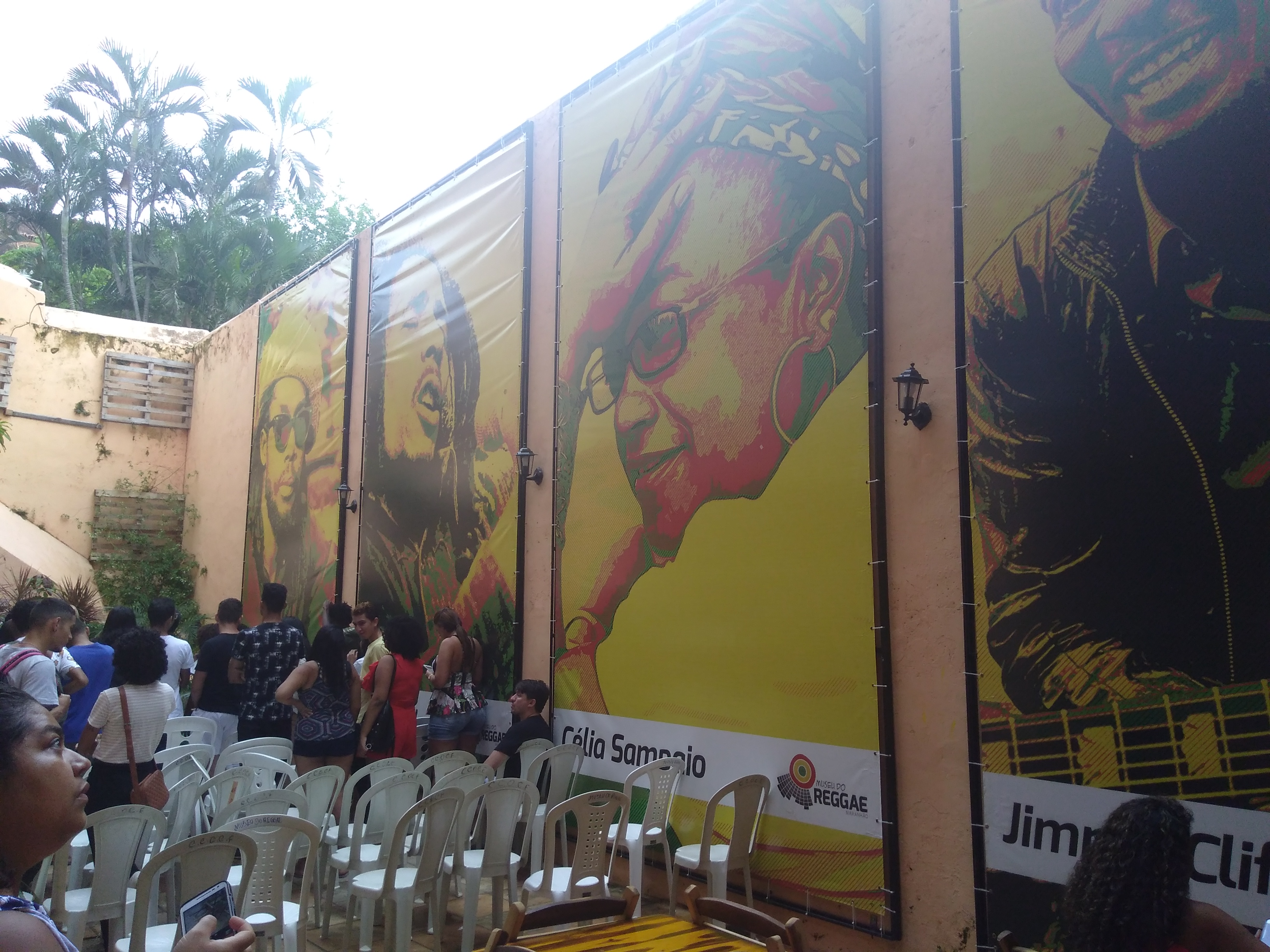
Reggae Personality Panels

The main goal of the architectural project was to honor Bob Marley, the greatest reggae icon in the world. The museum was painted in yellow, green and red.

The Museum of Reggae of Maranhão has five spaces. In the Hall of Immortals, the space seeks to honor the great names that have died of reggae in Maranhao. In the other four venues, the reggae clubs of São Luís are honored: Pop Som Club, the Toque de Amor Club, the União do BF Club and the Espaço Aberto Club.

The audience may have contact with rare records, historical videos and photos, reggae fashion over time, and testimonials recorded with characters from the reggae scene. They also compose the collection and digitize books, articles, theses and dissertations in the Library of Reggae, enabling research, in addition to the museum cafe, Roots Café.

The museum features relics of reggae, such as a guitar from the Maranhense band Tribo de Jah, used by the band in more than 20 countries, as part of the group's history, having been used in the main recordings of their songs and national and international major concerts. The radiola "Voz de Ouro Canarinho," by Edmilson Tomé da Costa, better known as Serralheiro, is one of the pioneers of reggae in Maranhão, and popularizer of the musical genre in the 1970s.

The space has structure for the realization of shows, musical festivals, meetings, workshops and dance classes.

The museum seeks to enable visitors to feel as if they are at a reggae party in their spaces.
