= Trailer Trash Tracys =

English band

- Origin: London, England
- Genres: Indie rock, Dream pop, shoegazing
- Years active: 2009–present
- Labels: Domino Records; Double Six Recordings; No Pain In Pop
- Members: Susanne Aztoria; Jimmy Lee
- Website: trailertrashtracys.com

Trailer Trash Tracys are an English experimental rock/dream pop band that originated in London, England.

== Career ==
The band was founded in 2011 by songwriters Susanne Aztoria and Jimmy Lee. They were later joined by bassist Adam Jaffrey and drummer Dayo James. The band's début album Ester was released through Domino Records on 9 January 2012 in the United Kingdom. Critics have identified dream pop and shoegazing elements in their sound. Susanne Aztoria has garnered critical acclaim, her vocals being described as sublime and honeyed. August 11, 2017 was the release date of the second album Althaea, which gained generally positive reviews.

== Touring ==
The band has toured with The xx, The Vaccines and The Kills. Additionally, they have played with bands including The Pains of Being Pure at Heart, Forest Swords and Real Estate. They have played multiple music festivals around the world as well including The Great Escape, Hinterland Festival in Glasgow, South by Southwest in Austin. and Nail In The Cross Festival in London.

== Song usage ==
- "You Wish You Were Red" was used in an advertisement for the Renault 4+ Package.
- "You Wish You Were Red" was used in the season two episode "Ghosts of the Past" of the US version of The Killing.
- "You Wish You Were Red" was used in episode 18 of the US version of The Secret Circle.
- "You Wish You Were Red" was used in season 1 episode 6 of the teen drama Riverdale.
- "Candy Girl" was used in episode 9 of season 2 of the Cinemax series Banshee.

== Discography ==
=== Studio albums ===
Year	Album details
2012	Ester: Released: 9 January 2012 (UK); Label: Domino Records / Double Six; Formats: CD, Digital Download, Vinyl
2017	Althaea: Released: 11 August 2017; Label: Domino Records / Double Six

=== Singles ===
Year	Single	Album
2012	"Candy Girl" (Vinyl only)	Ester
2011	"You Wish You Were Red"	Ester

== Members ==
=== Current ===
- Susanne Aztoria
- Jimmy Lee

=== Past ===
- Adam Jaffrey – bass
- Dayo James – drums
