= Semtex (album) =

Studio album by The Third Eye Foundation
- Released: 1996
- Genre: Drum and bass, trip hop
- Length: 48:10
- Label: Linda's Strange Vacation
- Producer: Matt Elliott

The Third Eye Foundation chronology
Semtex (1996)	In Version (1996)

Professional ratings
Review scores
Source	Rating
AllMusic	3/5 stars

Semtex is the debut studio album by Matt Elliott, released under the moniker The Third Eye Foundation. It was originally released on Linda's Strange Vacation in 1996.

The album was recorded on a 4-track recorder. Along with a mix of guitars, drum machines and noise samples, it features the voice of Debbie Parsons.

In 2015, Fact placed it at number 22 on their "50 Best Trip-Hop Albums of All Time" list.

== Track listing ==
No.	Title	Length
1.	"Sleep"	7:05
2.	"Still-Life"	11:27
3.	"Dreams on His Fingers"	5:47
4.	"Next of Kin"	6:09
5.	"Once When I Was an Indian"	12:31
6.	"Rain"	5:23

20th anniversary edition (2016) bonus disc
No.	Title	Length
1.	"Alarm Song"	6:19
2.	"Shard"	7:22
3.	"Die!"	6:58
4.	"Sleeping"	2:31
5.	"Leaving"	5:43
6.	"Hymn to Pan"	3:40
7.	"Get to Fuck"	4:44
8.	"Introversion"	3:20
