= Your Friend (band) =

Taryn Blake Miller (born in 1991 on April 10) who performs as Your Friend, is a musician from Kansas, now based in New York. Miller identifies as GNC/trans-masculine and uses they/them/theirs pronouns.

Miller was born in Winfield, Kansas. They studied music at Cowley Community College for two years before moving to Lawrence to pursue a degree in linguistics at the University of Kansas. Miller produced their first album, Jekyll/Hyde, using $1,000 in prize money from a KJHK-hosted battle of the bands. They signed with Domino Recording Company in February 2014.

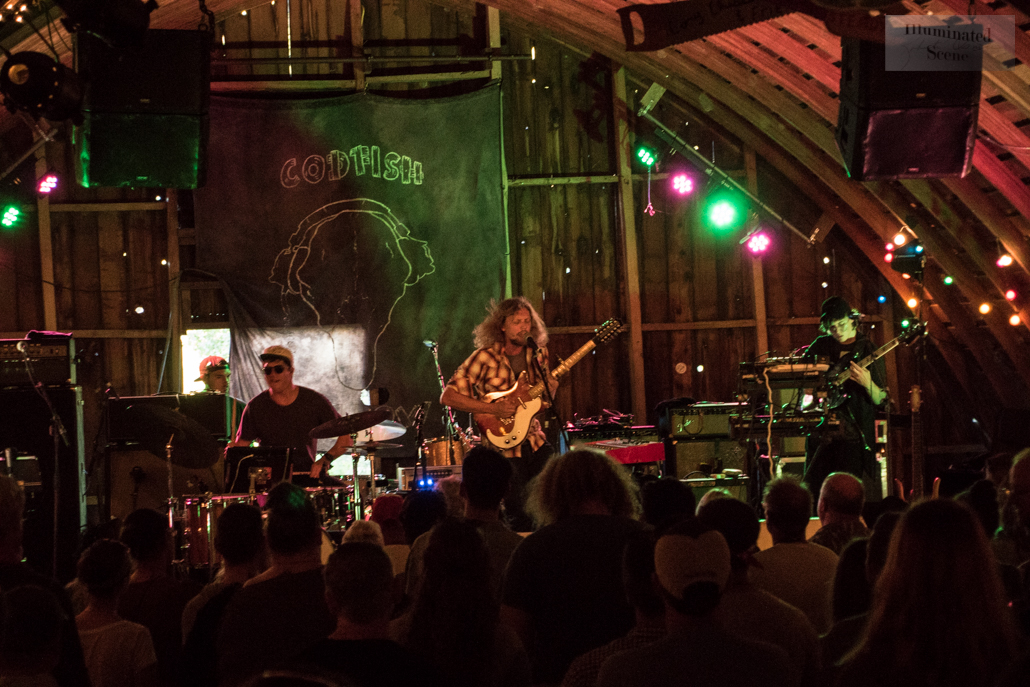

== Discography ==
=== Extended Play ===
| # | Album Info | Track listing |
|---|---|---|
| 1st | Jekyll/Hyde: Released：20 February 2014; Label: Domino Recording; Genres: Indie Rock; Neo-Psychedelia; Slowcore | 1. Bangs; 2. Peach; 3. Pallet; 4. Tame One; 5. Jekyll/Hyde; 6. Expectation/Reality |

=== Studio Album ===
| # | Album Info | Track listing |
|---|---|---|
| 1st | Gumption: Released：29 January 2016; Label: Domino Recording; Genres: Pop; Indie Folk; Indie Rock; Alternative Rock | 1. Heathering; 2. Come Back From It; 3. To Live With; 4. Desired Things; 5. Nothing Moved; 6. Gumption; 7. I Turned In; 8. Who Will I Be In The Morning |
