= Chorus (Flying Saucer Attack album) =

Compilation album by Flying Saucer Attack
- Released: 1995
- Genre: Experimental; space rock
- Length: 40:26
- Label: Domino; Drag City

Flying Saucer Attack chronology
Further (1995)	Chorus (1995)	Distant Station (1996)

Chorus is the second compilation album by the experimental space rock band Flying Saucer Attack. It collects tracks from singles, compilation cuts, and a John Peel radio session.

== Critical reception ==
Professional ratings
Review scores
Source	Rating
AllMusic	4/5 stars
The Line of Best Fit	7.5/10
Pitchfork	8.0/10
Rolling Stone	3/5 stars

Mark Richardson of Pitchfork stated, "despite the repetition and the feeling of deja vu, Chorus hangs together and makes for a richly rewarding 40-minute listen; Flying Saucer Attack are living proof that you only need a couple of ideas as long as they're good ones." Jon Wiederhorn of Rolling Stone commented that "the disc holds together as a cohesive work, evolving like an iridescent slide show of natural wonders."

== Track listing ==
1. "Feedback Song" (5:40)
2. "Light in the Evening" (4:02)
3. "Popol Vuh III" (3:15)
4. "Always" (4:29)
5. "Feedback Song" (demo version) (2:53)
6. "Second Hour" (3:33)
7. "Beach Red Lullaby" (3:58)
8. "There But Not There" (5:34)
9. "February 8th" (4:15)
10. "There Dub" (2:47)

== Personnel ==
Credits adapted from liner notes.

- Flying Saucer Attack – music
- Rocker – computer (1, 8, 10)
- Tim Brook – sleeve photography
