= Drinking Songs (album) =

Studio album by Matt Elliott
- Released: 7 February 2005
- Genres: Dark folk, electronic
- Length: 66:31
- Labels: Ici, d'ailleurs... (France), Acuarela Discos (Spain)

Drinking Songs is an album by English dark folk and electronic musician Matt Elliott, who is a former member of The Third Eye Foundation, released in France by Ici, d'ailleurs... and in Spain by Acuarela Discos.

== Reception ==
Professional ratings
Review scores
Source	Rating
AllMusic	3.5/5 stars
Pitchfork	7.2/10
Sputnikmusic	4.5/5
OndaRock	7/10
Soundofviolence	4/5

Pitchfork critic Matthew Murphy gave the album a 7.2 rating out of 10 and wrote that on the album, "Elliott seems to address the world from the sunless interior of an absinthe glass, with his rarified instrumental arrangements serving as the only thin balm available to keep his subjects from capsizing hopelessly into the ink-black, fathomless depths." Ned Raggett of AllMusic awarded the album 3.5 out of 5 stars, comparing the melancholic tones of the album to the early works of The Black Heart Procession and Tindersticks. Sputnikmusic gave the album a "superb" rating of 4.5 out of 5 and ended their review with the lines, "Matt Elliott has made of Drinking Songs a "beautiful and touching letter left in a bottle" within the reach of every lone sailor, the time of a storm."

The album was also praised by European publications. Italian webzine Ondarock highlighted its melancholic atmosphere and folk arrangements, while French publication Soundofviolence commented on its acoustic instrumentation.

== Track listing ==
No.	Title	Length
1.	"C.F. Bundy"	9:21
2.	"Trying to Explain"	2:39
3.	"The Guilty Party"	7:14
4.	"What's Wrong"	4:08
5.	"The Kursk"	11:34
6.	"What the Fuck Am I Doing on This Battlefield?"	5:15
7.	"A Waste of Blood"	5:51
8.	"The Maid We Messed"	20:26
Total length:		66:28
