= Matt Elliott (musician) =

English guitarist and singer-songwriter

- Also known as: The Third Eye Foundation
- Origin: Bristol, England
- Genres: Post-rock; electronica; slowcore; contemporary folk
- Occupations: Musician, producer, songwriter, singer
- Instruments: Guitar, vocals
- Years active: 1996–present
- Labels: Linda's Strange Vacation, Planet, Domino, Fat Cat, Merge, Ici, d'ailleurs..., Acuarela
- Website: Matt Elliott

Matt Elliott is an English music producer, guitarist and singer-songwriter, originally from Bristol, England and now based in France. He produced and recorded electronic music as The Third Eye Foundation before pivoting towards releasing folk music under his own name.

== Biography ==
Elliott started recording with the band Linda's Strange Vacation, which included Kate Wright and Rachel Brook, around the same time Wright and Brook formed Movietone and Brook and Dave Pearce formed Flying Saucer Attack. Elliott became a part-time member of both bands.

He recorded Semtex, his first album under the name The Third Eye Foundation, and released it on his own record label, Linda's Strange Vacation, with the help of the fledgling Domino Recording Company. The next three Third Eye Foundation albums were released on Domino in 1997, 1998 and 2000.

As Third Eye Foundation, Elliott worked with bands and artists including Amp, Hood, Yann Tiersen, Mogwai, Ulver, Tarwater, The Pastels, Navigator, Urchin, Suncoil Sect, Remote Viewer, and Thurston Moore primarily as a remixer. In 2001, a compilation album of his remixes was released.

In 2003, he released his first album under his own name, The Mess We Made, which marked a stylistic shift from The Third Eye Foundation releases. The next three albums were released as a trilogy on the French label Ici, d'ailleurs.... By the release of Drinking Songs (2004), his sound had changed considerably from his earlier work, now being compared to Tindersticks and The Black Heart Procession.

On Yann Tiersen's 2009 tour, Elliott was the support act, and later in the show was part of Yann's band onstage.

== Discography ==
All recordings were released under the Third Eye Foundation name up to and including 2001's I Poo Poo on Your Juju. Later recordings were released under Elliott's own name, except for 2010's The Dark, on which he resurrected the Third Eye Foundation name.

=== Studio albums ===
==== As The Third Eye Foundation ====
- Semtex (1996, Linda's Strange Vacation)
- In Version (1996, Linda's Strange Vacation) – remixes of tracks by Flying Saucer Attack, Amp, Crescent, Hood.
- Ghost (1997, Domino)
- You Guys Kill Me (1998, Domino)
- Little Lost Soul (2000, Domino)
- I Poo Poo on Your JuJu (2001, Domino) – remixes of tracks by Yann Tiersen, Tarwater, Urchin, The Remote Viewer, Chris Morris, Blonde Redhead, Faultline and Glänta.
- OuMuPo (2004, 0101 music) – 42 minute remix of Ici d'ailleurs back catalogue with a set of rules
- Collected Works (2006, Domino) – combines Ghost, You Guys Kill Me and Little Lost Soul, plus extra tracks
- The Dark (2010, Ici, d'ailleurs...)
- Wake the Dead (2018, Ici, d'ailleurs...)

==== As Matt Elliott ====
- The Mess We Made (2003, Merge)
- Drinking Songs (2005, Ici, d'ailleurs.../Acuarela Records)
- Failing Songs (2006, Ici, d'ailleurs.../Acuarela Records)
- Howling Songs (2008, Ici, d'ailleurs...)
- Failed Songs (2009, Ici, d'ailleurs...)
- The Broken Man (2012, Ici, d'ailleurs...)
- Only Myocardial Infarction Can Break Your Heart (2013, Ici, d'ailleurs...)
- The Calm Before (2016, Ici, d'ailleurs...)
- Songs of Resignation (2018, self published)
- Selected Works (2019, Ici, d'ailleurs...)
- Farewell to All We Know (2020, Ici, d'ailleurs...)
- The End of Days (2023, Ici, d'ailleurs...)
- Drinking Songs Live 20 years on (2024, Ici, d'ailleurs...)
- This World Is No Place for Children (2026, Talitres)

=== Singles ===
==== As The Third Eye Foundation ====
- "Universal Cooler" (1996, Planet Records)
- "Semtex" (1997, Domino)
- "Stars Are Down" (1997, 7" given away with Obsessive Eye magazine, split with KS Kollective)
- "Sound of Violence" (1997, Domino)
- "There's No End in Sight" (1998, Fat Cat Records, split with V/Vm)
- "Fear of a Wack Planet" (1998, Domino)
- "In Bristol with a Pistol" (1999, Domino)
- "What Is It With You?" (2000, Domino)

==== As Matt Elliott ====
- "Borderline Schizophrenic" (2003, Domino)
- "The Broken Man" (2011, Ici, d'ailleurs..., 7" with tracks from the album The Broken Man)
- "Manyfingers / Matt Elliott" (2012, Ici, d'ailleurs..., split 12" with Manyfingers)
- "Radius" (2024, Ici, d'ailleurs...)

== Filmography ==
- What a Fuck Am I Doing on This Battlefield – documentary by Nico Peltier and Julien Fezans (2013, 53min)
