= Further (Flying Saucer Attack album) =

Studio album by Flying Saucer Attack
- Released: 17 April 1995
- Recorded: 1994
- Genre: Shoegazing; space rock; drone; noise; lo-fi
- Length: 47:18
- Label: Drag City; Domino
- Producer: Flying Saucer Attack

Flying Saucer Attack chronology
Flying Saucer Attack (1993)	Further (1995)	Distant Station (1996)

Further is the second studio album by the English band Flying Saucer Attack. It was released through Drag City on 17 April 1995.

== Composition ==
Ned Raggett of AllMusic said that with Further, "the twosome achieved a new balance of delicacy and power, heightened in noticeable part by Pearce's increasingly assertive singing. His vocal approach of extended sigh as singing hadn't changed, but his words had a new clarity and crisper delivery, with fine results. Otherwise, FSA stayed the same general course musically, but again the arrangements provide the difference, with the unplugged folk side of Pearce's music now firmly taking the fore on [several] songs, often with gentle reverb or extra studio effects that make the songs all that much more intriguing. It's not quite Bert Jansch or John Fahey redux, but there's a definite sonic connection there that's well worth the hearing." Despite signing to Drag City, "no compromises were aimed at radio-friendly unit shifters." Mark Richardson of Pitchfork said Further contains "a little bit of everything—evocative instrumental miniatures, folky near-songs, extended spatial explorations—that made them good. There's plenty of fingerpicked acoustic guitar amid the white-noise din, and the bassy pulse of analog noisemakers floats in and out, evoking the spaciness of early '70s synth music. Pearce's voice, a husky tenor indeterminate pitch, is as buried as a voice can possibly be, but despite his extreme limitations as a vocalist, he manages to communicate melancholy, alienation, and loneliness."

== Songs ==
Opening track "Rainstorm Blues" features a roaring feedback squall that both ascends and descends in volume and gets further accompaniment from "hard-to-place crumbles and squeals, Brook's growling bass work setting the mood even stranger." The "majestic" second song "In the Light of Time" features "clear acoustic notes cutting through hum and drone." "Come and Close My Eyes" features buried waves of electric guitar in counterpoint to gentle picking and is accompanied at the end with "what sounds like a typewriter, without sounding jarring or out of place." Richardson said it is "structured enough that you could almost see someone covering it." It is followed by the extended, multi-part fourth track "For Silence", an example of Pearce's unplugged folk side taking to the fore. The fifth song "Still Point" shows Brook getting "a lovely moment of vocal glory." Raggett noted that her voice sounds "even more soft and restrained than Pearce's, rising through a striking squall of sound and, once again, upfront acoustic guitar." Richardson said that on the song, Brook's "slightly warmer tone" of voice breaks "the illusion that Pearce is the last person in the world." "To the Shore" is a "gnarly" instrumental that "moves from a cymbal tap to churning sonic violence and back to delicate acoustic guitar over the course of 12 minutes."

== Critical reception ==
Professional ratings
Review scores
Source	Rating
AllMusic	4.5/5 stars
Mojo	4/5 stars
Pitchfork	8.5/10
Rolling Stone	3/5 stars

Upon its release, Simon Reynolds, writing for Melody Maker, gave Further a rave review and called it "the best pure-guitar LP since Royal Trux's Cats and Dogs."

In 2016, Pitchfork ranked Further at number 26 on its list of "The 50 Best Shoegaze Albums of All Time".

== Track listing ==
All tracks are written by Flying Saucer Attack, except where noted.

No.	Title	Writer(s)	Length
1.	"Rainstorm Blues"		4:09
2.	"In the Light of Time"		4:48
3.	"Come and Close My Eyes"		4:27
4.	"For Silence"	Flying Saucer Attack; Acoustic Jon	7:39
5.	"Still Point"		3:12
6.	"Here Am I"		6:37
7.	"To the Shore"		12:08
8.	"She Is The Daylight"		4:13
Total length:			47:18
