= Flying Saucer Attack =

English experimental space rock band

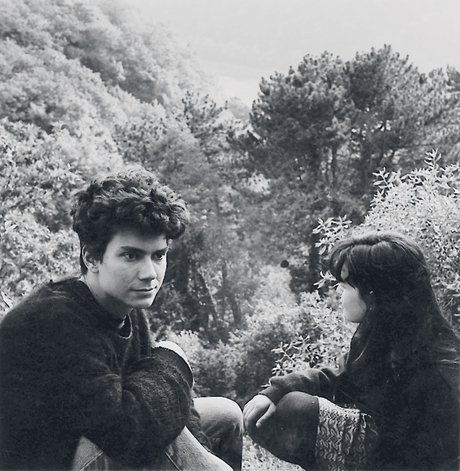
- Flying Saucer Attack

Background information
- Origin: Bristol, England
- Genres: Post-rock; space rock; shoegaze; dream pop
- Years active: 1992–2000; 2015–present
- Labels: FSA; Domino; Drag City; Enraptured; VHF Records
- Members: David Pearce
- Past members: Rachel Brook

Flying Saucer Attack is an English space rock band formed in Bristol in 1992, led by songwriter David Pearce. Rachel Brook (now Rachel Coe) of Movietone was a member during the band's early incarnation; Other musicians contributing to the group's recordings and live performances included Rocker (ex-the Flatmates), Matt Elliott (aka the Third Eye Foundation) and Sam Jones (of Crescent).

Drawing on krautrock, folk and dream pop, the group referred to their DIY sound as "rural psychedelia" and were associated with bands of the contemporary post-rock and shoegaze scenes. The band was able to create a small but enthusiastic fanbase, and were notable for recording most of their output at home, avoiding recording studios.

== History ==
Pearce had previously been a member of Ha Ha Ha, releasing the Up and Down EP in 1985. He then formed Rosemary's Children, issuing the 1986 single "Southern Fields" and 1987 album Kings and Princes. While at art school in Farnham, he met other Bristol musicians and played through the early 1990s as a member of various groups including the Secret Garden, the Distance and Linda's Strange Vacation.

Flying Saucer Attack formed in 1992 as a loose collective centered on the core of Pearce and Brook, releasing their debut single, "Soaring High", in January 1993 on their own FSA label. Their second single, "Wish", followed that June. Both singles were issued as limited edition vinyl 7-inches in handmade packaging.

The group's first studio album (self-titled, but sometimes called Rural Psychedelia as those words appeared on the cover) was released in 1993, and included a noisy cover of Suede's contemporary single "The Drowners", which provoked press interest in the record. Like the earlier singles, the album was released on FSA's own label by Heartbeat Productions, and was deliberately only made available on vinyl. The album was released in the United States by VHF Records in early 1994, on CD and vinyl – the CD bore the legend "compact discs are a major cause of the breakdown of society" (other releases would carry messages such as "keep vinyl alive", "home taping is reinventing music" and "less is more").

The band then signed to Domino Recording Company. The first release for the new label was Distance (October 1994), which collected the early singles and some unreleased material. It was released in the US by VHF. A contemporaneous non-album single, "Land Beyond the Sun", was Flying Saucer Attack's first release on US label Drag City, which issued it on 25 September 1994, followed by a Domino release the following month.

A second studio album, Further, was released on 17 April 1995, by Domino and Drag City. A cover of Wire's "Outdoor Miner" was released as a single that year. Another singles compilation followed, Chorus on 20 November 1995, including a sleeve note stating that "this album marks the end of FSA phase one". In 1995, Brook left the band to concentrate on Movietone.

A version of the folk song "Sally Free and Easy" was initially only released as a single on CD on 5 November 1996; the sleeve note explained that the pressing plant had been unable to cut it to vinyl (a US plant later achieved the feat by using a monaural master, and it was issued on 12" by Drag City). Full-length 1996 releases included In Search of Spaces, an album consisting of early 1994 live tracks (mainly unstructured noise, released by Bruce Russell's Corpus Hermeticum imprint), and Distant Station, an album with two long tracks constructed by fellow Domino act Tele:Funken from samples of the band.

The three-song "Goodbye" EP, released 21 January 1997 on VHF Records, was a mix of old and new material; the second track, recorded live in April 1995, featured New Zealand guitarist Roy Montgomery.

New Lands, Flying Saucer Attack's third studio album, was released in October 1997. The band described it as "phase two", but it did not depart from the usual mixture of aggressive feedback and noise, and gentle folk-influenced melody. After New Lands and a final vinyl-only 7" single, "Coming Home", both issued in 1997, Pearce left Domino.

The "phase 2" version of Flying Saucer Attack accepted an invitation to participate in a tribute album to Moby Grape co-founder Skip Spence, who was dying of lung cancer. More Oar: A Tribute to the Skip Spence Album, featuring their cover of "Grey - Afro", was released by Birdman Records on 6 July 1999.

Flying Saucer Attack's fourth studio album, Mirror, was released 17 January 2000 on FSA, effectively marking the end of the group for the next 15 years. Pearce subsequently collaborated with Jessica Bailiff under the name Clear Horizon; the duo released an eponymous album on Kranky in 2003.

The only new material released by the band during their sabbatical came in 2008, when Flying Saucer Attack participated in a two-disc Fire Records compilation setting all 36 poems from James Joyce's 1907 Chamber Music poetry collection to music by contemporary alternative acts.

After a 15-year hiatus, Flying Saucer Attack released a new album, Instrumentals 2015, on 17 July 2015.

== Musical style ==
Their musical style has been described as space rock, post-rock, shoegaze, and dream pop.

== Discography ==
=== Studio albums ===
- Flying Saucer Attack (1993, FSA Records)
- Further (1995, Domino Records/Drag City)
- New Lands (1997, Domino Records/Drag City)
- Mirror (2000, FSA Records/Drag City)
- Instrumentals 2015 (2015, Domino Records/Drag City)

=== Singles and EPs ===
- "Soaring High" (1993, FSA Records)
- "Wish" (1993, FSA Records)
- "Crystal Shade" (1994, FSA Records)
- "Land Beyond the Sun" (1994, Domino Records/Drag City)
- "Beach Red Lullaby" (1995, Planet Records)
- "Outdoor Miner" (1995, Domino Records)
- "At Night" split with Jessamine (1996, Enraptured)
- "Sally Free and Easy" (1996, Domino Records/Drag City)
- "Goodbye" featuring Roy Montgomery (1997, VHF Records)
- "Up in Her Eyes" (1997, Stop Smiling)
- "Coming Home" (1997, Domino Records)

=== Live albums ===
- In Search of Spaces (1996, Corpus Hermeticum)

=== Compilation albums ===
- Distance (1994, Domino Records/VHF Records)
- Chorus (1995, Domino Records/Drag City)
- Mort Aux Vaches split with Main and White Winged Moth (2000, Mort Aux Vaches)
- P.A. Blues (2004, VHF Records)
- Heartbeat / Complete (2012, Weltraum)

=== Collaboration albums ===
- Distant Station with Tele:Funken (1996, Domino Records/Drag City)

=== Compilation appearances ===
- "Since When (One)", "Since When (Two)", "Since When (Three)" and "Since When (Four)" on Harmony of the Spheres (1996, Drunken Fish Records)
- "Grey - Afro" on More Oar: A Tribute to the Skip Spence Album (1999, Birdman Records)
- "XXIV Silently She's Combing" on Chamber Music: James Joyce (1907). 1-36. (2008, Fire Records)

== See also ==
- List of bands from Bristol
- Culture of Bristol
- Heartbeat Productions
