= Movietone (band) =

English post-rock band

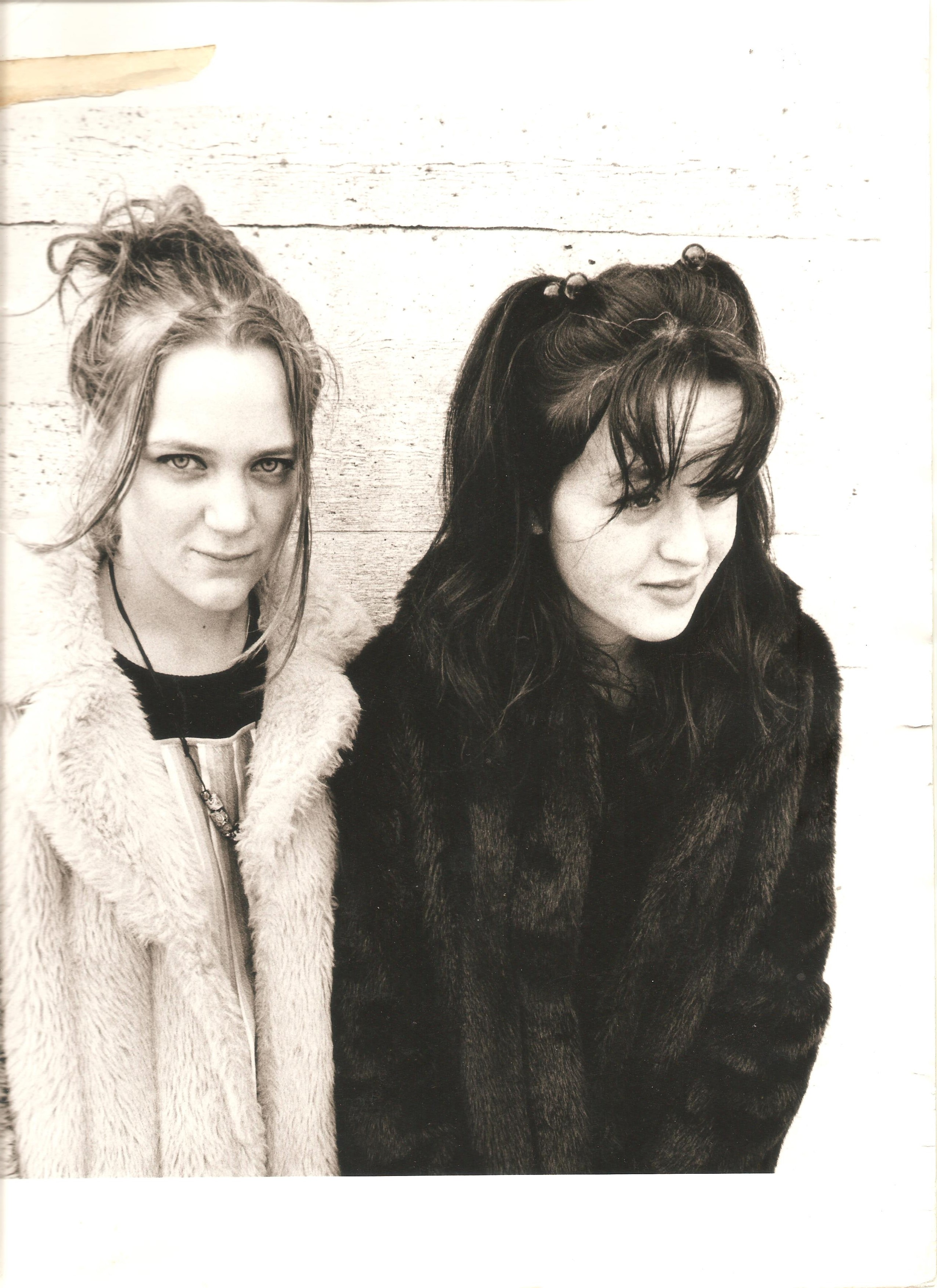
Kate Wright and Rachel Brook, Movietone

Movietone is an English post-rock band. They formed in Bristol in 1994. Core members are Kate Wright and Rachel Brook, with Wright being the main songwriter.

Kate Wright is also in the band 1000 Dawns and is currently the bass player for Crescent. Rachel Brook was a member of Flying Saucer Attack during the first few years of the band's existence. Matt Jones (Crescent) has been the drummer since the start and recorded and mixed many of the songs. Other musicians have included: Matt Elliott (The Third Eye Foundation), Ros Walford, Florence Lovegrove, Sam Jones (Balky Mule, Crescent), Chris Cole (Many Fingers), Tom Cops (My Two Toms), Michal William (Headfall), Lisa Brook (Headfall), George McKenzie (Headfall, Motes, Vase), John Coe and Clare Ring.

Movietone recorded three John Peel Sessions at Maida Vale Studios on 12 May 1994, 28 January 1996, and 31 August 1997.

2003's The Sand and The Stars was partly recorded live on a bay near Land's End.

Kate Wright features on Appendix Out's Daylight Saving (Drag City, 1999) and (with Matt Jones) on Headfall's Stars Don't Shine to Noise (Spazoom/Little Waves, 2003) and My Two Tom's Who We Were and What We Meant by It (Stitch-Stitch, 2010).

Before Movietone, Matt Elliott, Kate Wright, and Rachel Brook formed the band Lynda's Strange Vacation.

Rachel Brook did a 7-inch record under the name From Red Down (Acetone, 1999).

Movietone is featured on the soundtrack to the film Hallam Foe.

== Discography ==
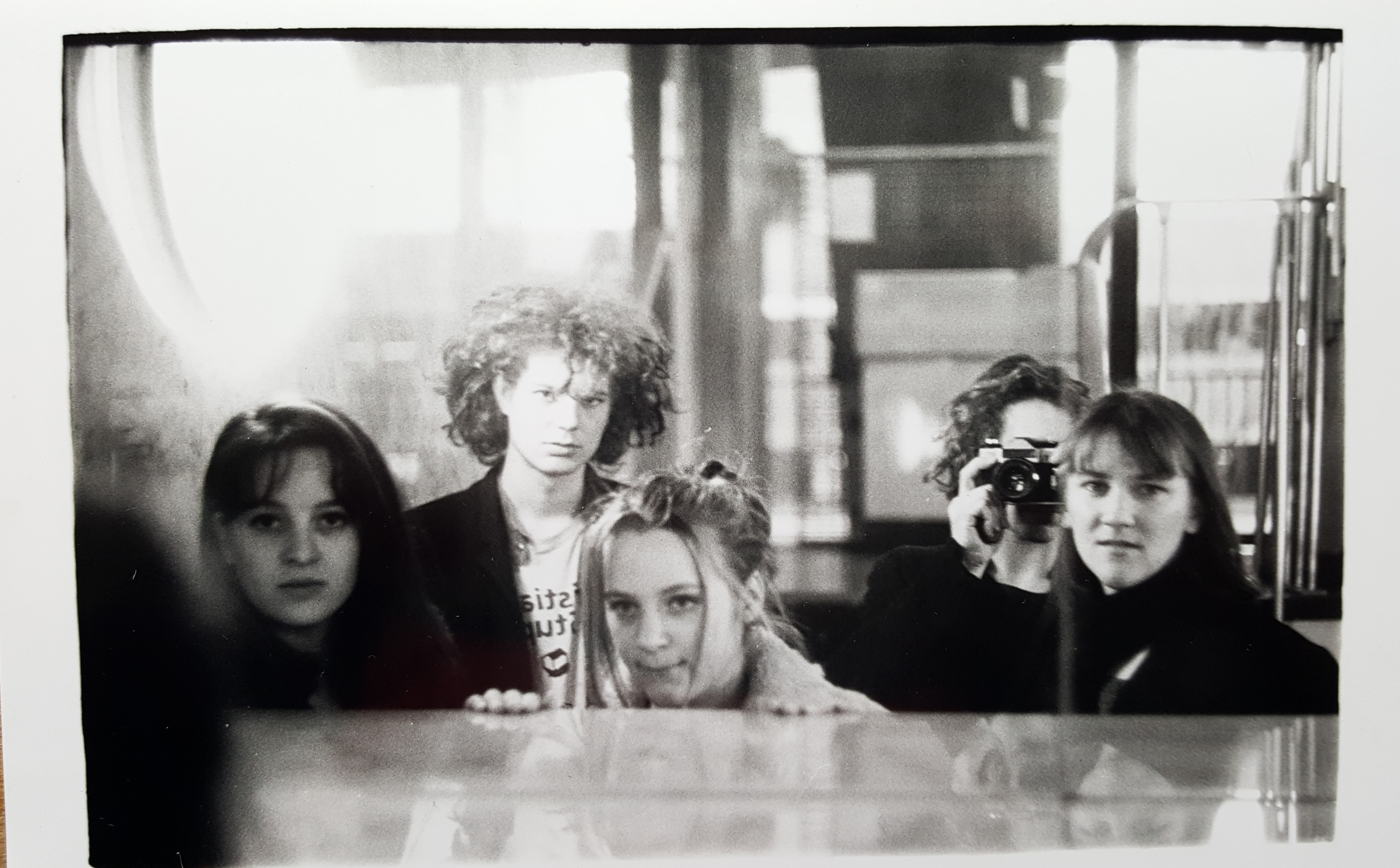
Movietone circa 1994/5. L–R: Rachel Brook, Matt Elliott, Kate Wright, Matt Jones, Ros Walford

=== Albums ===
- Movietone, Planet Records, 1995 (Re-issued on Geographic, 2003)
- Day and Night, Drag City and Domino, 1997
- The Blossom Filled Streets, Drag City and Domino, 2000
- The Sand and The Stars, Drag City and Domino, 2003
- Peel Sessions 1994–1997, Textile, 2022

=== Singles (all 7" vinyl and Flexi Disc only) ===
- "She Smiled Mandarine Like" / "Orange Zero" (Planet, 1994)
- "Mono Valley" / "Under the 3000 Foot Red Ceiling" (Planet, 1995)
- "Useless Landscape" / "Summer" (Planet, 1997)
- "Sun Drawing" / "Marine Oceano" (Domino, 1997)
- "Noche Marina" / "Night of the Acacias" live at the Cube Cinema, 1 May 1999 (Archipeligo-Disc/Little Waves/Movietone 2004)
- "Porthcurno live at the Knitting Factory, New York, 2000", Ltd Edition 7 inch Flexi Disc (radio/ON 2020)
