= Jessamine (band) =

American post-rock band of the 1990s

- Origin: Galion, Ohio, United States
- Genres: Post-rock, space rock, psychedelic rock, drone, experimental rock
- Years active: 1992–1999
- Label: Kranky
- Members: Andy Brown; Michael Faeth; Rex Ritter; Dawn Smithson
- Website: www.kranky.net/artists/jessamine.html

Jessamine was an American post-rock band, that recorded three albums for Kranky records between 1994 and 1998, and a number of singles for other record labels. These singles were later collected by the band on a self-released compilation album in 1997 entitled Another Fictionalized History.

Their single "Cellophane" was a minor college radio hit in the band's native Seattle, getting frequent airplay on KCMU (now KEXP).

The band's sound was influenced by the works of Krautrock bands such as Can and Neu!, and their first album also bore some sonic resemblance to the sounds of early 1990s bands from the UK shoegaze scene. This mesh of krautrock, shoegaze, drone, space-rock, and experimental electronica helped the band forge a unique sound, which helped them stand apart from other active bands in the Seattle scene that were more grunge, metal, or indie-rock based. Their success in solidifying a unique sound however did not translate to album sales, and the band remained a relatively obscure act, with a small cult following.

The band split in 1998, and Ritter and Brown recorded together as Fontanelle for a couple more years.

== Musicians ==
- Andy Brown – keyboards
- Michael Faeth – drums
- Rex Ritter – electric guitar, vocals
- Dawn Smithson – vocals, bass

== Discography ==
=== Albums ===
- Jessamine [1995]
- Long Arm of Coincidence [1996]
- Another Fictionalized History [1997]
- Don't Stay Too Long [1998]
