= Crescent (band) =

English post-rock project

Crescent are an English post-rock project from Bristol, formed in 1994 by Matt Jones (guitar, vocals and other instruments), Chris Locke (bass on earlier albums) and Jasper Larsen (drums and percussion). Currently, the two principal members are brothers Matt Jones and Sam Jones (guitar and other instruments). Sam Jones also plays and records as 'The Balky Mule'.

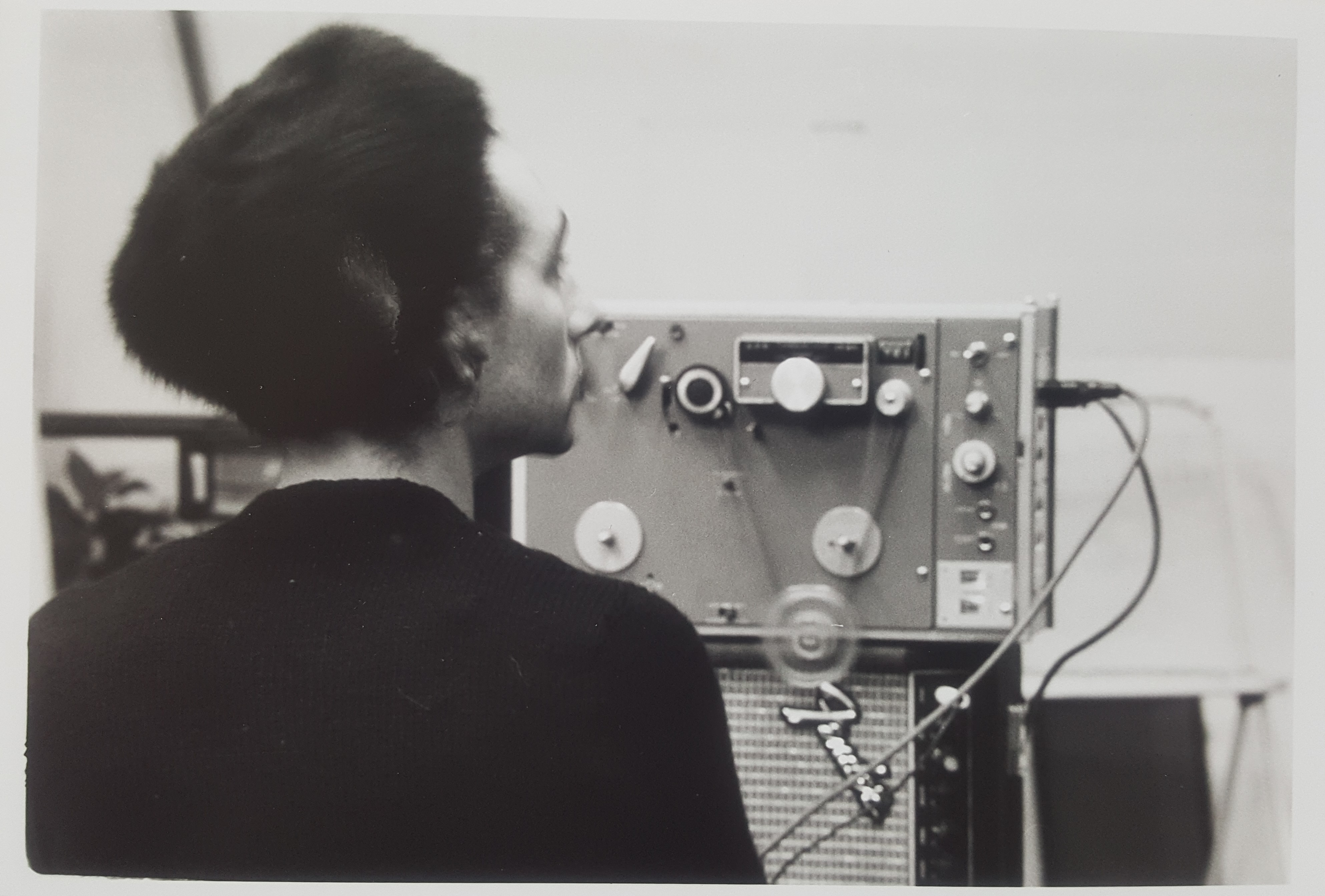
Matt Jones, Crescent, circa 1995. Photo by Kate Wright.

Both the Jones brothers are also members of Movietone. Kate Wright (singer and guitarist in Movietone) is also the bass player in Crescent. Movietone's Rachel Coe plays clarinet on their 2017 album Resin Pockets, and Sam Jones occasionally played live with Flying Saucer Attack, a band which also had Rachel Coe (then Brook) as a member.

Crescent's music is generally slow, minimalistic and melancholy, unsurprisingly in a similar vein to Movietone but with an occasionally harsh, discordant edge, particularly in the earlier records. Recordings are deliberately low fidelity, often incorporating ambient sounds and samples of speech. The second album Electronic Sound Constructions was recorded by Matt Jones alone, and is entirely instrumental. The release of By the Roads and the Fields (2003) marked a change of style and since then the band have adopted a more song-focused approach.

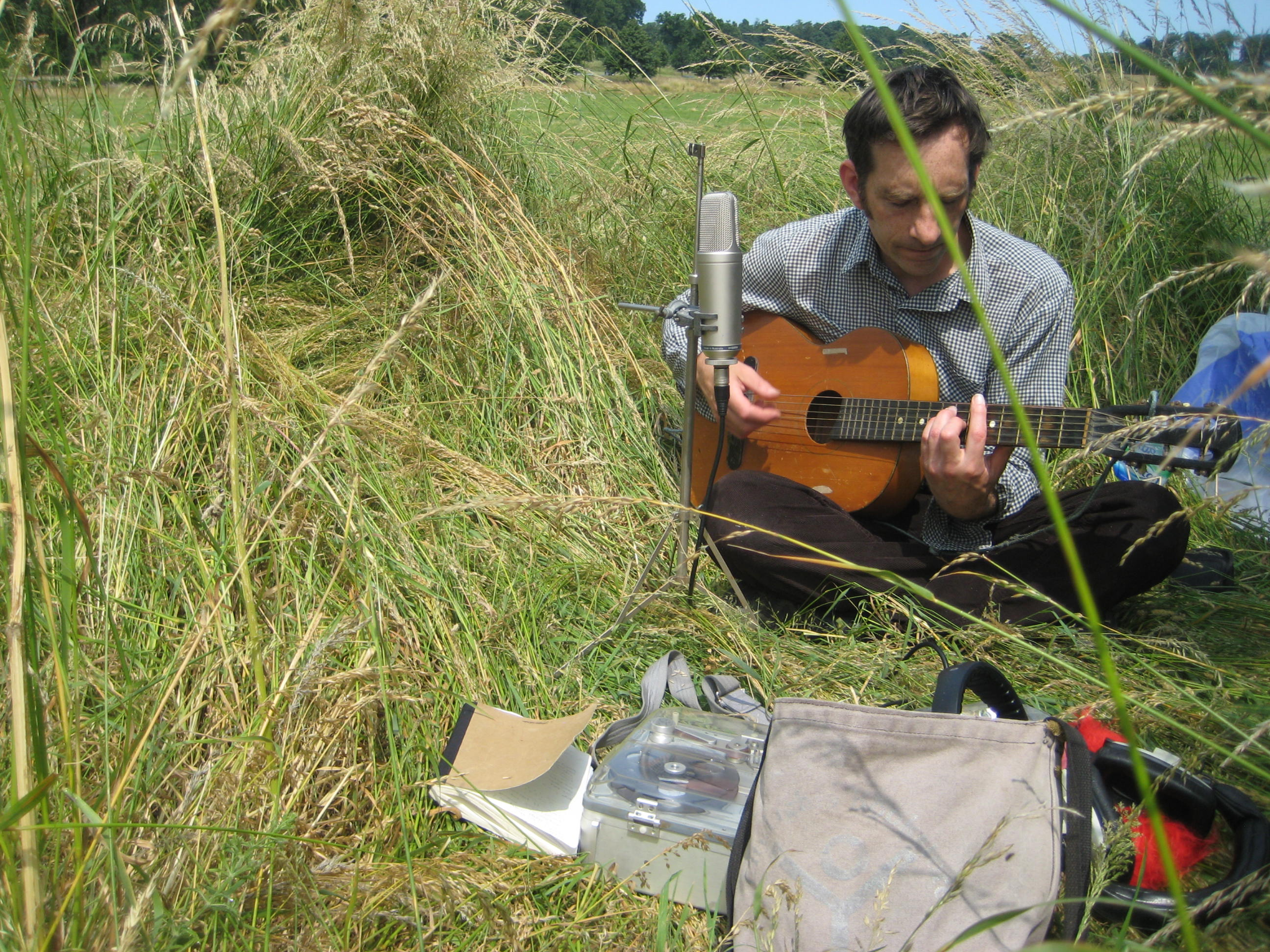
Matt Jones, Crescent, circa 2017. Photo by Sam Jones

== Discography ==
=== Albums ===
- Now (Planet / Atavistic, 1995)
- Electronic Sound Constructions (Snapshot, 1997)
- Collected Songs (Roomtone, 1999)
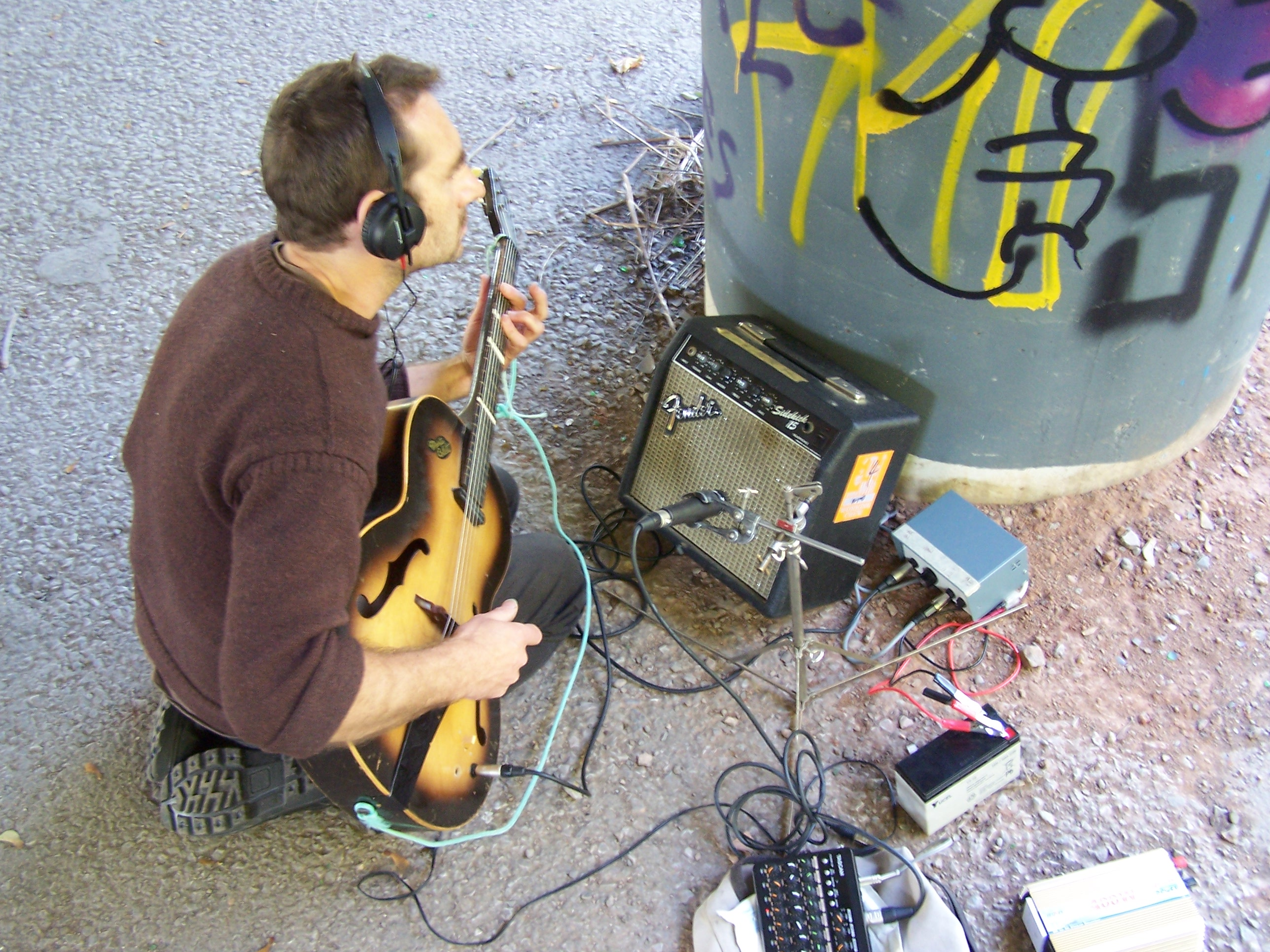
  Matt Jones, Crescent, circa 2017. Photo by Sam Jones.
- By the Roads and the Fields (Fat Cat, 2003)
- Little Waves (Fat Cat, 2007)
- Resin Pockets (Geographic, 2017)

=== Singles ===
- "Lost" (Planet, 1994)
- "Sun" (Planet, 1994)
- "Sun" / "*" / "Unit System" EP (Atavistic, 1996)
