= Domino Recording Company =

British independent record label

- Founded: 1993
- Founder: Laurence Bell; Jacqui Rice
- Distributors: Redeye (US); PIAS Group (UK); FUGA (digital only); Hostess (Japan)
- Genre: Various
- Country of origin: United Kingdom
- Location: London, England
- Official website: dominomusic.com

Domino Recording Company, or simply Domino, is a British independent record label based in London. There is also a wing of the label based in Brooklyn, New York that handles releases in the United States, as well as a German division called Domino Deutschland and a French division called Domino France. In addition, Stephen Pastel presides over the subsidiary label Geographic Music, which releases more 'unusual' music from Britain and outside of the Western world. In 2011, the company announced that it was beginning a book publishing division, The Domino Press.

== History ==
Founded in 1993 by Laurence Bell and Jacqui Rice, the label's first release was the Sebadoh EP Rocking the Forest, licensed from Sub Pop records for release in the UK. Many of the early releases were by American artists who in the US were signed to Drag City (Smog, Will Oldham, Royal Trux), a relationship which continues to this day. Success was not immediate, as labels such as Domino, who were releasing more established American rock and unusual British music, were marginalised during the Britpop era, but a steady stream of new signings gave the label increasing credibility. Recent high-profile releases from Anna Calvi, Franz Ferdinand, Arctic Monkeys, Wild Beasts, and The Kills have only acted as a catalyst to this, and Domino is now one of the longest running and most successful independent record labels in the UK.

The label celebrated its 10th anniversary in 2003. There were a number of new releases, as well as a compilation album and a series of gigs in London under the 'Worlds of Possibility' banner, to celebrate the label's first decade in October of that year.

Domino celebrated their first UK #1 album in October 2005 with Franz Ferdinand's You Could Have It So Much Better, and their first UK #1 single with Arctic Monkeys' "I Bet You Look Good on the Dancefloor" later that same month.

In 2006, Bell and co-owner, Harry Martin, founded Domino Publishing Company, a music publishing company.

In March 2021, it was announced that seminal shoegaze band My Bloody Valentine had signed with the label. This announcement was accompanied by the first ever official digital release of the band's discography to streaming platforms.

As well as new music, Domino have released compilations by British post-punk bands such as Orange Juice, Josef K, Fire Engines and Young Marble Giants.

== Notable artists ==
=== Domino UK ===
==== Current ====
- About Group
- Alexis Taylor
- Alex Turner
- Animal Collective
- Anna Calvi
- Archie Bronson Outfit
- Arctic Monkeys
- Austra
- Lou Barlow
- Blood Orange / Lightspeed Champion
- Bob Moses
- Bonnie Prince Billy
- Buzzcocks
- Clinic
- Dan Deacon
- Dirty Projectors
- Fat Dog
- Fat White Family
- FFS
- Seamus Fogarty
- Four Tet
- Franz Ferdinand
- Frànçois & the Atlas Mountains
- Galaxie 500
- Georgia
- Hookworms
- Hot Chip
- Jon Hopkins
- Julia Holter
- Junior Boys
- The Kills
- King Creosote
- The Last Shadow Puppets
- Stephen Malkmus and the Jicks
- Malachai
- Max Tundra
- Cass McCombs
- Eugene McGuinness
- Middle Kids
- Juana Molina
- My Bloody Valentine
- Orange Juice
- Owen Pallett
- The Pastels
- Pavement
- Pram
- Protomartyr
- Psapp
- Quasi
- Real Estate
- Róis
- Royal Trux
- Bill Ryder-Jones
- Sebadoh
- Sons and Daughters
- Sorry
- Spiral Stairs
- Superorganism
- Hayden Thorpe
- Tirzah
- To Rococo Rot
- Tricky
- Mr Twin Sister
- Villagers
- Patrick Watson
- Wet Leg
- Matthew E. White
- Robert Wyatt
- Wyatt, Atzmon & Stephen
- James Yorkston

==== Former artists ====
- 10,000 Things
- Adem
- Aerial M
- Alex G
- ...And You Will Know Us by the Trail of Dead
- The Blueskins
- Bonde do Role
- Chief
- Clearlake
- Come
- Correcto
- Crescent
- Cindy Dall
- Deluxx Folk Implosion
- Ducktails
- Matt Elliott
- Elliott Smith
- The Fall
- The Feelies
- Benjy Ferree
- Fence Collective
- Flipper
- Flying Saucer Attack
- The Folk Implosion
- Fridge
- Ganger
- Gastr del Sol
- Neil Michael Hagerty
- Hood
- James Yorkston & The Big Fancy Players
- Josef K
- Juana Molina
- Kieran Hebden & Steve Reid
- Leatherface
- Jason Loewenstein
- Lone Pigeon
- Loose Fur
- The Magnetic Fields
- Matt Sweeney & Bonnie Prince Billy
- Barbara Morgenstern
- Mouse on Mars
- Movietone
- Neutral Milk Hotel
- Jim O'Rourke
- Will Oldham
- Pajo
- Palace / Palace Brothers / Palace Music / Palace Songs (Will Oldham, AKA Bonnie "Prince" Billy)
- Papa M
- Preston School of Industry
- The Pyramids
- Quickspace
- Quickspace Supersport
- Scarce
- Sentridoh
- Silver Jews
- Smudge
- Steve Reid Ensemble
- Superchunk
- The Television Personalities
- Telstar Ponies
- Test Icicles
- The Third Eye Foundation
- The Triffids
- These New Puritans
- u.n.p.o.c.
- Townes Van Zandt
- Von Südenfed
- Weird War
- HyperCupcake
- Wild Beasts
- Yo Majesty
- James Yorkston and The Athletes
- Young Marble Giants

=== Domino US ===
- Adem
- Alex G
- Animal Collective
- Benjy Ferree
- Caribou
- Cass McCombs
- Chief
- Clearlake
- Clinic
- Correcto
- Dirty Projectors
- Four Tet
- Franz Ferdinand
- Future Pilot AKA
- Juana Molina
- Julia Holter
- Junior Boys
- Lightspeed Champion
- Malachai
- Melody's Echo Chamber
- Middle Kids
- Neutral Milk Hotel
- Night Moves
- The Notwist
- Orange Juice
- Panda Bear
- The Pastels
- Porches
- The Range
- Sasami
- Sebadoh
- Sons and Daughters
- To Rococo Rot
- Twin Sister
- Ulrich Schnauss
- Upchuck
- White Lung
- Yo Majesty
- James Yorkston and the Athletes
- Your Friend

== Imprints ==
=== Geographic Music ===
- Bill Wells Trio
- Empress
- Future Pilot AKA
- International Airport
- Kama Aina
- Lightships
- Maher Shalal Hash Baz
- Nagisa ni te
- September Collective
- Spinning Coin
- Teenage Fanclub & Jad Fair
- The Royal We

=== Double Six Records ===
- Bill Ryder-Jones
- Jon Hopkins and King Creosote
- Bill Wells
- The Child of Lov
- John Cale
- Spiritualized
- Steve Mason
- Petite Noir
- She & Him
- Trailer Trash Tracys
- Twin Sister
- George FitzGerald

=== Weird World ===
- How to Dress Well
- Peaking Lights
- Smith Westerns
- Washed Out
- Melody's Echo Chamber
- Richard Dawson
- Wilma Archer
- Silicon
- Jaakko Eino Kalevi

=== Rekords Rekords ===
- Queens of the Stone Age
- Mondo Generator
- Alain Johannes
- Mini Mansions

== See also ==
- List of record labels
- List of independent UK record labels
