= List of poets from Mumbai =

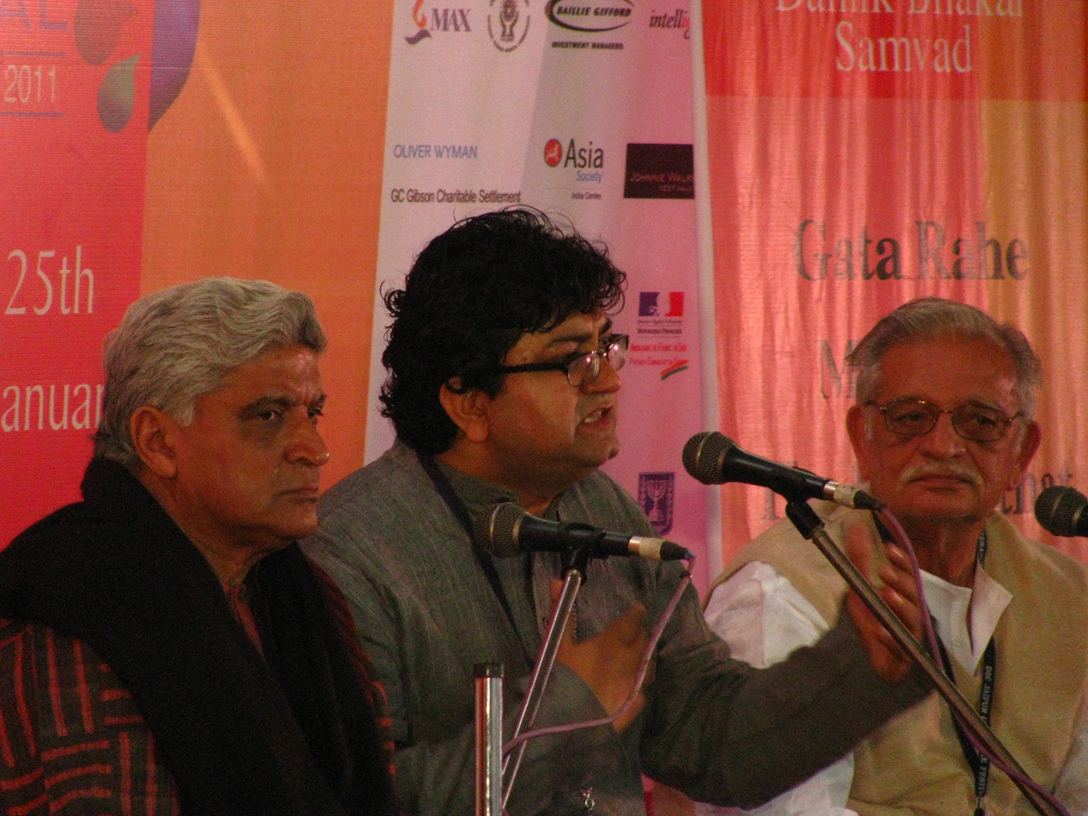
Javed Akhtar, Prasoon Joshi and Gulzar

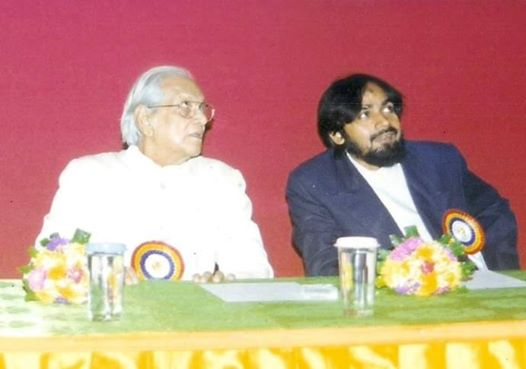
Urdu Poets & Bollywood Lyricists Majrooh Sultanpuri & Ubaid Azam Azmi in a Literary program at Ratnagiri, Maharshtra on 28/11/1999.

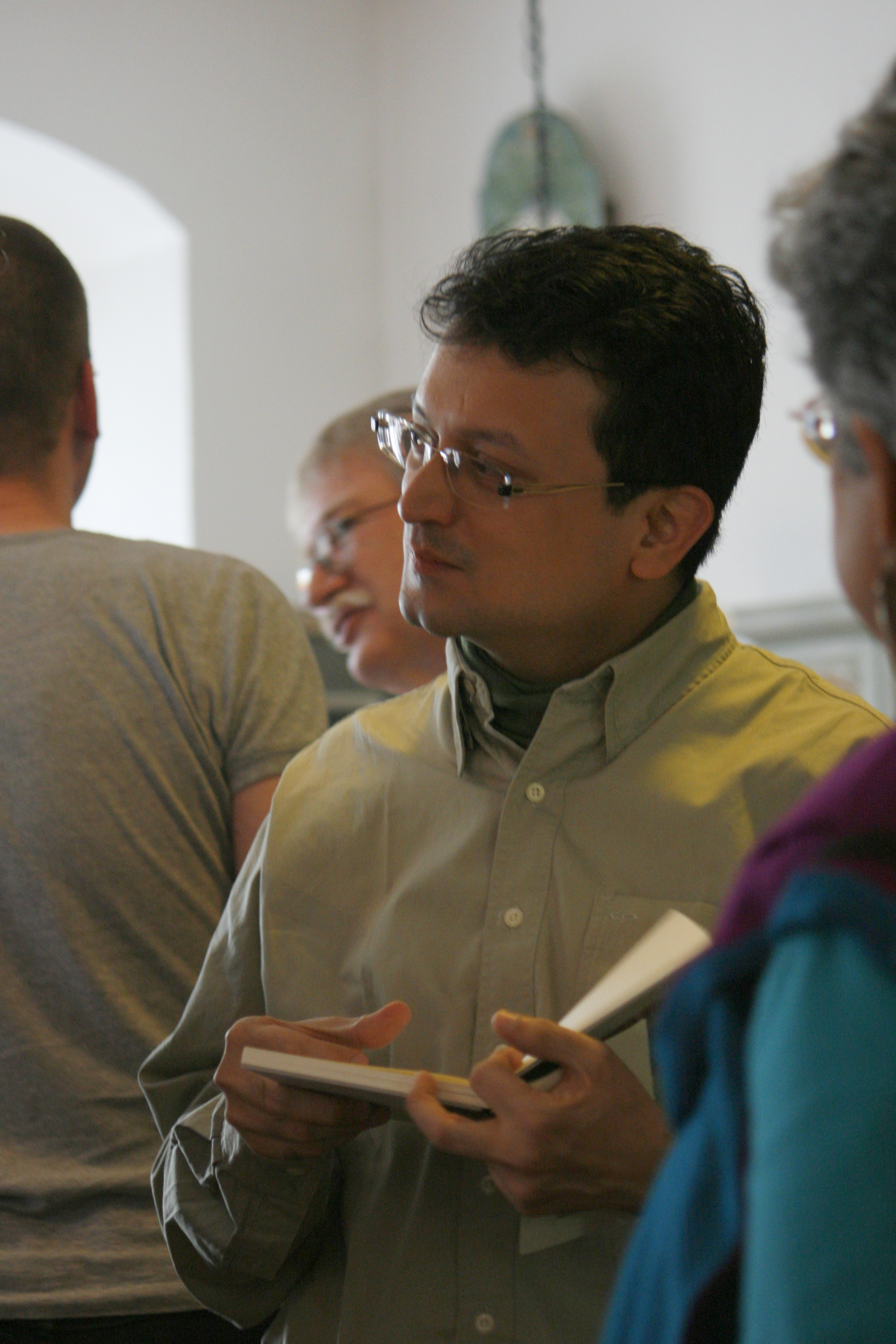
Ranjit Hoskote at Leselenz Hausach 2012

== Urdu poets ==
- Ali Sardar Jafri
- Majrooh Sultanpuri
- Sahir Ludhianvi
- Kaifi Azmi
- Nida Fazli
- Javed Akhtar
- Shakeel Badayuni
- Quaiser Khalid

== Marathi poets ==
- Narayan Surve
- Mangesh Padgaonkar

== Hindustani poets ==
- Gulzar
- Javed Akhtar
- Majrooh Sultanpuri
- Sameer
- Prasoon Joshi

== Indian English poets ==
Bombay Poets (or, Bombay School of Poets) is one which is known to redefine Indian English poetry. The school began in the 1960s, and have flourished ever since. It has includes persons who have also changed the perception of Indian poetry by performing in cultural hubs such as Soho, London, New York, and many more of such places. Their selected works have also been achieved at the Cornell Library.

- Nissim Ezekiel
- R. Parthasarathy
- Dom Moraes
- Adil Jussawalla
- Arvind Krishna Mehrotra
- Dilip Chitre
- Gieve Patel
- Ranjit Hoskote
- Eunice de Souza
- Jerry Pinto
- Annie Zaidi
- Arun Kolatkar
- Santan Rodrigues
- Rochelle Potkar

== See also ==
- List of people from Mumbai
