= Witness (UK band) =

British alternative rock band

- Origin: Wigan, Greater Manchester, England
- Genres: Alternative rock Lo-fi; Americana
- Years active: 1997–2004; 2008; 2026
- Labels: Valiant Recordings; Island
- Past members: Gerard Starkie; Ray Chan; Dylan Keeton; John Langley; Julian Pransky-Poole; Becky Home; Paul Harte
- Website: witness.uk.com

Witness were a British alternative rock band formed in Wigan, Greater Manchester in 1997. The band released two albums via Island Records between 1999 and 2001, before splitting up in 2004.

== History ==
=== Formation ===
Singer-songwriter Gerard Starkie and guitarist Ray Chan first met at Wigan & Leigh College and spent their early years in and out of various local bands which didn't quite match the sound that they were both hoping for; most notably Gerard in Embryonic and Ray in Easter. As a result, they eventually set about writing and recording a number of 4-track demos together, which were mixed by their friend Nick McCabe of The Verve.

Bassist Dylan Keeton became the next member to join the band which would eventually go on to become Witness, as a result of an advert he had placed in the local Loot newspaper. After securing a record deal with Island, they went on to add both drummer John Langley and guitarist Julian Pransky-Poole – initially to enhance their live sound during gigs, but later as a full-time member – to the line-up.

=== Breakthrough ===
Before settling on the name Witness, the band initially played a handful of gigs in nearby Manchester under the names Siren and High Mountain Jag in mid-1997. Witness' big break came in the same year, as they ventured down to London to watch The Verve support Oasis at Earl's Court in September 1997. Ray, a long-time friend of Nick McCabe's, met someone backstage at the gig who did press for The Verve (Tim Vigon). He passed on a recently recorded demo tape – produced by former Tansads songwriter and guitarist John Kettle – and just a week later they had signed a three-album deal with Island Records. At this stage, Witness had not yet settled on a band name or played a gig under the name, and as such, their record contract simply referred to them as the 'Wigan Band'.

The initial press attention enjoyed by the band came as a result of Ray's friendship with Nick, and so, comparisons with The Verve were rife. The NME even went on to refer to the band as Nick McCabe's Mates Band, during the period in which they were still nameless. Moreover, Witness were co-managed by The Verve's press officer, Tim Vigon, along with Rob Partridge, Chairman of Coalition PR, who, together, comprised Witness-based 'Valiant Management'.

In 1998, Witness managed to secure support slots on tour with Whiskeytown, The Seahorses and Gene, before going on to self-release their debut single, "Quarantine", through Valiant Recordings on 23 November. The single was released on 7" limited edition vinyl, with only 1000 copies available. The following year, after performing further support slots for both Mansun and Deus, the band's first release for Island came with their second single, "Scars", released on 1 March 1999. It entered the UK Singles Chart at No. 71 and remained there for a sole week, as did their third single, "Audition", which followed in June of the same year. Their debut album, Before The Calm, was produced by Phil Vinall, recorded at Rockfield Studios, near Monmouth in Wales, and was released on 12 July to critical acclaim, including a glowing review in the NME;

"It is an astonishing debut album; stripped of all affectation, daring to be understated when others would have hit the anthem button".

Yet, despite the magazine's high regard for the LP, it failed to gain a place on their annual "Top 50 Albums of the Year" list.

=== Under A Sun ===
After the release of their debut LP, the band had hoped to put out a follow-up shortly after, but the songs they chose to submit to Island for inclusion on the album were rejected outright by the label's bosses, "who questioned the quality of the new songs".

Following Universal's takeover of Island Records, Witness recorded and released a one-off song in April 2000 to be included on the soundtrack to the UK TV show, Randall and Hopkirk. The song, titled "Zero Zero", signified somewhat of a departure for the band from the understated, downbeat sound they had delivered on Before The Calm, as they chose to opt for a much more driving and energetic approach. They went on to perform a number of gigs previewing their new batch of songs throughout 2000, most notably at the famous Tower Ballroom in Blackpool, as a support act for Embrace on 4 May, whilst 16 May saw the US release of Before The Calm, with the inclusion of two bonus tracks.

The band continued to pursue a new, Americana-tinged direction on their second album, Under A Sun, released on 23 July 2001, as their record label's new parent company proved to be more accepting of the band's new material. Just five days after its physical release, all of the album's tracks were made available to listen to in their entirety via their then-official website. Despite Pransky-Poole's involvement in the recording of the previous album, his addition to the band's official line-up coincided with the release of their follow-up, leading to assumptions that Witness' new sound was a direct result of his input.

Like its predecessor, Under A Sun garnered a notable amount of critical attention, though not on the same, universal scale as that of their debut. The well-respected Americana UK website went on to crown the LP their 'Album of the Year' for 2001:

"It's almost impossible to describe the elation you feel on completing the first listen to "Under a Sun" – it’s not just that it's the best album of 2001 but it's not too strong to say that it’s easily one of the best albums released in recent memory".

Elsewhere, comparisons with The Verve continued, along with likenings to the country rock stylings of both Neil Young and The Byrds. 'Under A Sun' spawned a further two singles for the band in the form of "You Are All My Own Invention", which preceded the album's release, issued on 9 July, and "Here's One For You" which followed on 5 November. Though both releases received some solid reviews, they failed to feature in the Top 75 of the UK Singles Chart. In an effort to broaden the band's meagre fanbase, Universal Records secured a slot for the latter of the two songs in the soundtrack to the 2001 feature film, American Pie 2, made by their sister company, Universal Pictures.

=== Beginning of the end ===
In December 2001, Julian was asked to leave the band, for reasons unknown, and by March 2002, in the midst of demoing what would have been their third album, it had been announced that Witness had been dropped by their record label. Despite this setback, they went on to perform a well-received headline set at the 'Americana One' festival in August 2002, and also returned to the studio to record an EP's worth of new material, slated for release in early 2003. In January 2003, a hometown gig was announced at Wigan's 'Mill at the Pier' for 5 April, set to promote the independent release of the planned EP. Yet, despite the gig being a sold-out success, the EP was never issued.

== Post-split ==
The band 'split up' in February 2004, but continued as 'Gerard Starkie' with the same personnel. The following year the band split properly when Ray left, moving to Hong Kong to teach English.

Throughout 2005, Gerard continued to perform solo gigs, whilst August 2006 saw the self-release of his debut solo album, Drawbridge. The album release was exclusive to his official MySpace site and was made solely available in download form. In November 2006, Gerard embarked on his first proper solo tour, to coincide with a new one-off track titled "The Whispering", released on the limited edition 10" vinyl compilation Tales From The Lux via Wigan-based Lupine Records.

Alongside his solo career, Gerard has performed with The Blue Aeroplanes, who John Langley was also a founding member of on drums. In August 2008, it was announced that Gerard and Ray would reunite to play a one-off gig of Witness material in Hong Kong.

Throughout 2010, Gerard undertook a string of fully backed solo performances to promote his forthcoming solo album, featuring Joe Allen, John Langley and Loki Lillistone of The Blue Aeroplanes.

In 2026 Lupine Records re-issued the debut album on vinyl for the first time, limited to 250 copies, and the band (Gerard, Ray and John plus Mike Youe and Ed Taylor - also members of the Blue Aeroplanes) played two gigs in Bristol and Atherton (near Wigan) to commemorate the release. They played the album in full plus four fan favourites. Support on both dates was by Gerard’s band with his partner Hazel Winter as The Jesus Bolt. There was also a private gig in Horsham, Sussex prior to these dates for a fan who had also got Witness to perform a private show near Kendal in the late 2010s.

== Discography ==
=== Studio albums ===
Title	Details	Peak chart positions	
Title	Details	UK	SCO
Before the Calm	Released: 12 July 1999; Label: Island; Format: LP, CD	59	—
Under a Sun	Released: 23 July 2001; Label: Island; Format: LP, CD	62	68

=== Singles ===
Title	Year	Peak chart positions	Album
Title	Year	UK	Album
"Quarantine / Into the Waves"	1998	—	Non-album single
"Scars"	1999	71	Before the Calm
"Audition"	1999	71	Before the Calm
"Hijacker"	1999	—	Before the Calm
"You Are All My Own Invention"	2001	80	Under a Sun
"Here's One for You"	2001	96	Under a Sun
