= Bombay Poets =

Literary Arts Movement in Mumbai (Bombay), India

Bombay Poets (or, Bombay School of Poets) was one of the founding "school" of poets of Indian English literature of the post-independence era. Several members of the group are credited with redefining Indian English poetry as well as the perception of Indian poets abroad. The "school" began in the 1950s-60s with prominent names like Nissim Ezekiel, R. Parthasarathy, Dom Moraes, Adil Jussawalla, Arun Kolatkar, Eunice de Souza and many more gathering at Kala Ghoda. Due to their international acclaim, they have also performed their works in London, New York, and other cities. Some of their archives are today housed at Cornell University Library.

Scholars Anjali Nerlekar and Laetitia Zecchini (who each published a monograph on Kolatkar) co-edited a double special issue of The Journal of Postcolonial Writing in 2017 on 'The Worlds of Bombay Poetry', with academic articles, memoirs, letters, interviews with 'Bombay poets', artists, and editors, as well as many visual and textual documents.

The work of the 'Bombay Poets' remains largely influential till date in India, and has inspired generations of authors & poets.

== List of Bombay Poets ==
- Nissim Ezekiel
- R. Parthasarathy
- Dom Moraes
- Adil Jussawalla
- Arvind Krishna Mehrotra
- Dilip Chitre
- Gieve Patel
- Ranjit Hoskote
- Eunice de Souza
- Jerry Pinto
- Annie Zaidi
- Arun Kolatkar
- Santan Rodrigues
- Rochelle Potkar
