= Potion (disambiguation) =

A potion is a magical medicine, drug or poison in liquid form.

Potion or Potions or Magic Potion may also refer to:

- "Potion" (song), a 2022 song by Calvin Harris featuring Dua Lipa and Young Thug
- Potions (album), a 2011 indie/Americana album by Gerard Starkie
- "Potions" (song), a 2019 song by American DJ duo Slander and dance producer Said the Sky
- "The Potion", a 2005 rap single by Ludacris
- Magic Potion (album), a 2006 garage rock/blues rock album by the Black Keys
