= Hidden Charms =

Hidden Charms may refer to:

- Hidden Charms (band), on Deltasonic record label
- Hidden Charms (Willie Dixon album), Grammy Award-winning album 1988
- Cherrystone: Hidden Charms, compilation album Executive-producer David Holmes 2004
- Hidden Charms, 1994 album with "Stripped Right Away" & "Call Me Your Girlfriend" by Rita Lynch
- "Hidden Charms", song by Link Wray 1966
- "Hidden Charms", song by Colin James (album)
