= Art Objects =

Art Objects may refer to:

- Work of art, an aesthetic physical item or artistic creation
- Art Objects (band), a Bristol-based post-punk band
