= WLCI =

WLCI may refer to:

- Wigan and Leigh College, India, an Indian university
- WLCI-LP, radio station licensed to Nelsonville, Ohio
