= Sara Rai =

Indian writer and translator

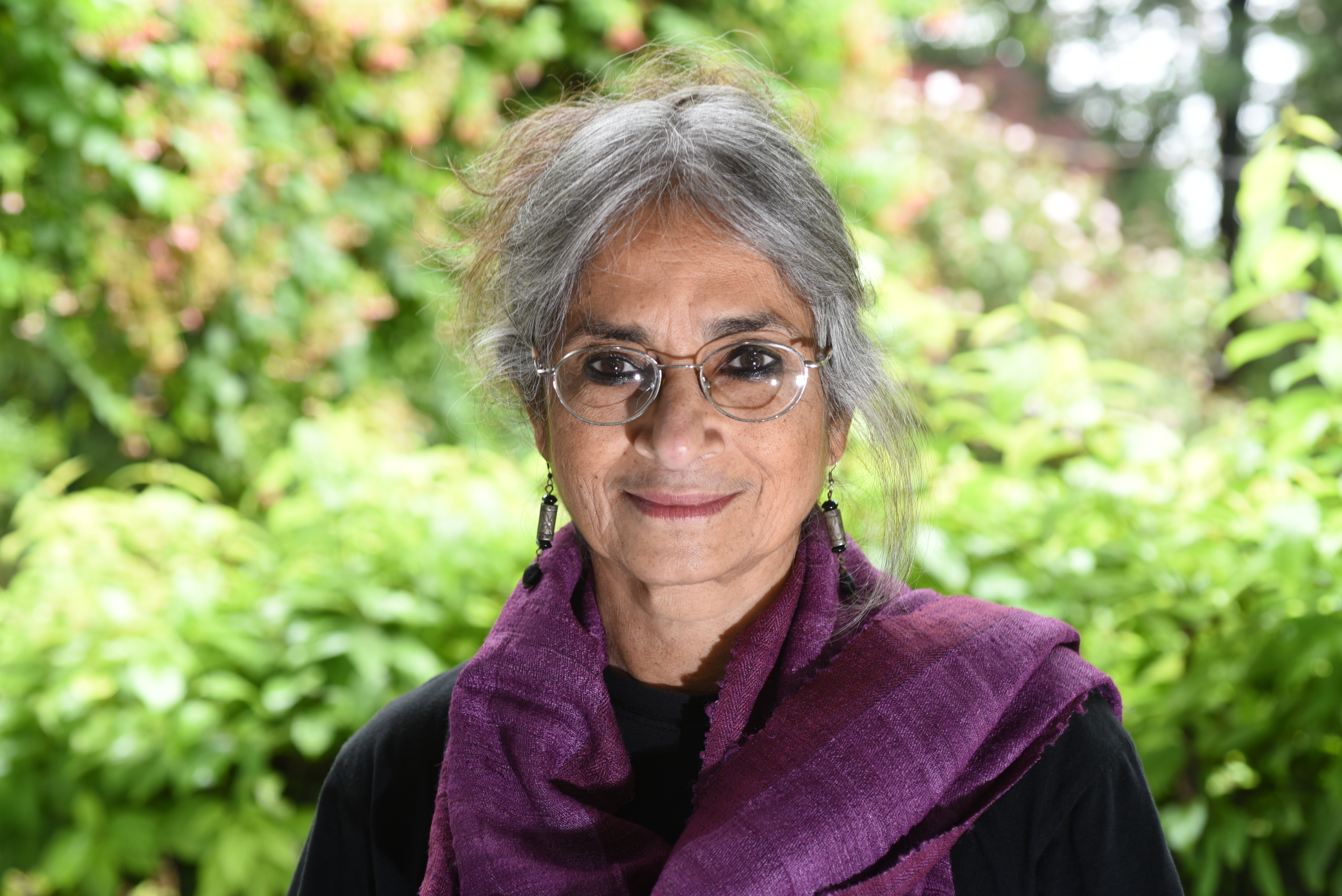
- Sara Rai in 2018
- Born: 15 September 1956 (age 69)
- Education: Jawaharlal Nehru University (MA); University of Allahabad (MA)
- Occupations: Writer, translator, editor
- Relatives: Munshi Premchand (grandfather)

Sara Rai (born 15 September 1956), is a contemporary Indian writer, translator and editor of modern Hindi and Urdu fiction. She lives in Prayagraj (formerly Allahabad), Uttar Pradesh, India. Rai mainly writes and publishes short stories in Hindi. Written in a reflective prose style, her stories explore the individual complexities in the lives of ordinary people and outsiders in contemporary India.

== Biography ==
Sara Rai was born into a family of writers and artists based in Allahabad. Sara Rai's grandfather is the writer Dhanpat Rai Srivastava, better known by his pen name Munshi Premchand. His second wife, Shivrani Devi (DOB unknown-1976), was an active follower of Mahatma Gandhi. Sara Rai's father, the literary critic and painter Sripat Rai (1916–1994), was the founding editor of Kahani (1937–39 and 1953–79), one of the leading literary journals of the Nayi Kahani Movement. Her mother, Zahra Rai (1917–1993), also wrote and published short stories in Hindi.

Sara Rai received a master's degree in Modern History from the Jawaharlal Nehru University, New Delhi, in 1978. Three years later, she accomplished her masters in English Literature at the University of Allahabad. Rai started writing at a young age. Her first story "Lucky Horace" was published in the Damn You magazine founded and edited by Arvind Krishna Mehrotra and Sara's cousins Alok and Amit Rai in the early 1960s. Since 1990, she published four short story collections, a novel, several essays and a memoir in 2023. Besides, Rai has been working as an editor and translator of fiction by Vinod Kumar Shukla, Munshi Premchand, Zahra Rai, Moghal Mahmood, Pankaj Bisht, Shaukat Hayat, Geetanjali Shree (International Booker Prize winner 2022) and others from Hindi and Urdu into English.

Rai has taken part in public activities of the national and international literary scene: In 2019, a reading tour took her to Germany, where she was invited, among other places, to the International Literature Festival Heidelberg. In 2021, she held the chair of jury for the JCB Prize for Literature.

== Works ==
In her essay "You will be the Katherine Mansfield of Hindi", Sara Rai reflects her struggle of becoming a writer and finding her own literary voice in the multilingual and -cultural backgrounds of both her family and her home town Allahabad. This essay, renamed into "On not Writing", became a part of Rai's memoir Raw Umber (2023) published in English. By recalling memories of her growing up as a child and author in an environment of intellectual inspiration and creative freedom, this autobiographical account also reveals the emotional shallows and strokes of fate happening to a family who is under the shadow of a famous ancestor. Each chapter is dedicated to a single family member, who is portrayed as an individual with unique talents, quirks and contradictions. Interwoven with these character studies, the book offers insights into the daily life of a middle-class family in urban India in the first decades after Independence, as well as into the history of the Rai family's feudal Muslim and rural Hindu heritage. In his praise, Pankaj Mishra points out: "Raw Umber is the rare memoir that doubles as social and emotional history."

Rai's short stories depict the everyday lives and perceptions of individuals in contemporary India. They are mainly set in North Indian cities such as Delhi, Varanasi (Benares) or Allahabad. Her characters come from various social, economic and religious backgrounds. "On the brink" (Kagaar par), for example, is told from the perspective of a middle aged gay artist in Delhi who falls in love with a young migrant worker. "Babu Devidins new world" (Babu Devidin ki Nayi Duniya) depicts the daily struggles of a hypochondriac pensioner, and "Criminal on the run" (Mujrim Farar) is a narration about a rapist who manages to escape after murdering a young woman but eventually loses his mind in the solitude of his hiding-place.

The author is especially interested in how the clashes and conflicts of modern India surface in the daily life of her protagonists. Many topics of her stories are universal – the struggles of getting old in a quickly transforming world, the search for identity in turbulent times, and the experience of being socially excluded in terms of belonging to a ‘different’ class, gender, religion, or socio-economical background. By calling herself a "Hindustani writer", Rai positions herself in the shared linguistic and cultural tradition of South Asian Hindus and Muslims. This choice is reflected in the fact that many of her characters display distinctive idioms or different registers of Hindustani. For example, the old Muslim woman in "Labyrinth" (Bhulbhulaiyan) is strongly influenced by Perso-Arabic vocabulary referring to the Nawabi culture of the 19th century. In other stories, such as in "Criminal on the run" (Mujrim Faraar), Rai uses a colloquial style to imitate a mix of illiterate local dialect and urban Bollywood slang as spoken in contemporary Mumbai.

The Hindi scholar Thomas de Bruijn states that "Rai's work shows the evocative power of a literary idiom in which the heritage of many premodernities are accumulated. Its dialogic nature, refusing to be fixed to a single, monologic identity, makes it a perfect idiom for expressing the conundrum of modernity in a contemporary Indian context." In order to narrate each story from a subjective perspective, Rai frequently applies the narrative device of the stream-of-consciousness. This focus on individual perspectives in her writing draws a connection to the Nayi Kahani of the 1950s and 60s. Rai's interest in depicting the nuances of human feelings and interactions not only establishes a literary affinity to the Nayi Kahani in Hindi literature, but also to other modern and contemporary writers such as Anton Chekhov, Marcel Proust and Alice Munro.

Rai's first novel, Cheelvali Kothi (The House of Kites) came out in 2010. The novel narrates the story of a formerly wealthy, educated and secular lineage of Hindu Banias, traders and accountants, and its gradual decay. The novel, which is set in the ancestral mansion (kothi) of the family in Varanasi (Benaras), is told from the perspectives of its members, among them the orphan Meena, who comes to the mansion as a companion to the family's daughter as a teenager. Meena and the eldest son of the house, Vikram, secretly fall in love with each other. Vikram, who holds a University degree but has no job, engages as social activist and fights for the rights of the poor. However, when the question of marriage arises, he agrees to marry a woman chosen by his parents instead of taking side for his true love (but presumably low-caste) Meena – which turns out a fatal decision.

== Reception ==
In India, Sara Rai's work has been receiving growing attention among writers, critics and readers alike. Nirmal Verma states in the preface of Rai's first book Abaabeel ki Udaan: „If the secret of art is concealed in [E. M.] Forster’s "Only Connect" comment, it is Sara Rai's extraordinary talent of searching for a connection between most unrelated things and bringing to light an astonishing truth."

Her stories have been translated into Urdu, English, German, French and Italian language.

== Bibliography ==
=== Fiction and memoir ===
- 2023: Raw Umber: A Memoir, Westland Books.
- 2022 Nabila aur anya Kahaaniyan (Nabila and other stories), Rajkamal Prakashan.
- 2015 Bhulbhulaiyan (The Labyrinth and other stories), Surya Prakashan Mandir.
- 2010 Cheelvali Kothi (House of Kites, novel), Harper Collins Hindi & Rajkamal Prakashan.
- 2005 Biyaabaan men (In the Wilderness, story collection), Rajkamal Prakashan.
- 1997 Abaabeel ki Udaan (The Swallow's Flight, story collection), Rajkamal Prakashan.

=== Edited books (selection) ===
- 2019 Blue Is Like Blue: Stories by Vinod Kumar Shukla, ed. and transl. from Hindi with Arvind Krishna Mehrotra, HarperCollins.
- 2020: Moghal Mahmood & Zahra Rai: Mahalsara ka ek Khel aur Anya Kahaniyan (A Game in the Women's Quarter and Other Story), ed. and transl. from Hindi, Vani Prakashan.
- 2019: Shivrani Devi: Premchand Ghar men (Premchand at Home), ed. and transl. from Hindi, Nayee Kitaab.
- 2019: Vinod Kumar Shukla: Blue Is Like Blue: Stories, ed. and transl. from Hindi with Arvind Krishna Mehrotra, HarperCollins.
- 2013: Premchand’s Kazaki and other Marvellous Tales, ed. and transl. from Hindi, Hachette India.
- 2003: Hindi. Handpicked Fictions, ed. and transl. from Hindi, Katha.
- 1999: Imaging the Other, ed. and transl. from Hindi with GJV Prasad, Katha.
- 1990: The Golden Waistchain, ed. and transl. from Hindi, Penguin.

=== Selected essays and stories in English translation ===
- 2022: "Mango Blossoms" (story) by Zahra Rai, transl. from Hindi by Sara Rai. In: The Silence That Speaks: Stories by Indian Muslim Women, ed. by Haris Qadeer, Oxford University Press India.
- 2022: "The Will" (story) by Moghal Mahmood, transl. from Hindi by Sara Rai. In: The Silence That Speaks: Stories by Indian Muslim Women, ed. by Haris Qadeer, Oxford University Press India.
- 2020: "On Not Writing" (essay). In: The Book of Indian Essays: Two Hundred Years of English Prose, ed. by Krishna Arvind Mehrotra, Black Kite and Hachette.
- 2020: "The Labyrinth" (story). In: The Greatest Hindi Stories Ever Told, ed. and transl. by Poonam Saxena, Aleph Book Company.
- 2017: "Old Veranda" by Vinod Kumar Shukla, transl. from Hindi with Arvind Krishna Mehrotra. In: +1, No. 28.
- 2013: "Reading Godaan" (essay). In: 50 Writers 50 Books, ed. by Sebastian and Siddan, Harper Collins.
- 2011: "Vagabond Nights" by Gyan Ranjan (essay), transl. from Hindi by Sara Rai. In: The Last Bungalow: Writings on Allahabad, ed. by Arvind Krishna Mehrotra, Penguin.
- 2003: "Our Small World" by Sara Rai, transl. from Hindi by the author. In: Sara Rai (ed.): Hindi Handpicked Fictions, Katha.

== Awards and honours ==
- 2023: Tata Literature Live! Book of the Year Award for Non Fiction (for Raw Umber)
- 2020: Mathrubhumi Book of Year Award (for Blue is like Blue by Vinod Kumar Shukla)
- 2019: Atta Galatta Prize of the Bangalore Literarature Festival in the category fiction (for the translation Blue is like Blue by Vinod Kumar Shukla)
- 2019: Coburger Rueckert Prize (Germany) for her literary work

== See also ==
- Excerpt of Raw Umber: https://scroll.in/article/1041979/memoir-author-translator-sara-rai-on-being-premchands-granddaughter-and-falling-into-writing
- Ep. 255: Sara Rai Inhales Literature, Podcast "The Seen and the Unseen" by Amit Varma with Sara Rai. Retrieved 2023-10-11.
