= Rough Music (album) =

Studio album by the Blue Aeroplanes
- Released: 1995
- Label: Beggars Banquet
- Producer: Gerard Langley

The Blue Aeroplanes chronology
Up in a Down World EP (1994)	Rough Music (1995)	Sugared Almond EP (1995)

Rough Music is an album by the English band the Blue Aeroplanes, released in 1995.

== Production ==
The album was produced by frontman Gerard Langley. Andy Sheppard played saxophone on "Secret Destination". Around 25 musicians are credited on Rough Music, not including the band's dancer, Wojtek Dmochowski.

== Critical reception ==
Professional ratings
Review scores
Source	Rating
AllMusic	3/5 stars
Calgary Herald	B+
Daily Breeze	3/4 stars
The Encyclopedia of Popular Music	3/5 stars
MusicHound Rock: The Essential Album Guide	3/5 stars

The Independent wrote that "Langley still writes songs as if transposing mid-century English poetry to the rock milieu for the benefit of girls he wants to impress." The Guardian noted that "the Bristol band are so skilled at classy blurred-guitar pop that they can probably turn it out in their sleep (and moody vocalist Gerard Langley sounds as if he did)... With a few exceptions, like the sarcastic 'A Map Below', the thing flows smoothly past without trace." The Daily Breeze concluded that "the band rocks out more effectively than it has since 1990's Swagger album, storming through 'Scared' and 'Dark' with impressive force."

The Gazette determined that Langley "has a Celtic earnestness in 'Scared', a roll call of relationship fears that works because it's true, but otherwise his urgency sets off alarms all over pretension police HQ." The Vancouver Sun thought that "Blue Aeroplanes play truly psychedelic music ranging from free-jazz sax skwonkings to shimmering guitars like spider-webbing made from sugar-water and dulcimer/psaltery Old World picking."

AllMusic wrote that "the mix of relaxed, easy-going vibes and electric rush otherwise generally carries the album, with strong examples of both tendencies easily evident."

== Track listing ==
No.	Title	Length
1.	"Detective Song"
2.	"Sugared Almond"
3.	"Scared"
4.	"Worry Beads"
5.	"Contact High!"
6.	"A Map Below"
7.	"James"
8.	"Whatever Happened to Our Golden Birds?"
9.	"Wond'ring Wild"
10.	"Saint Me and the Devil"
11.	"Dark"
12.	"Secret Destination"
13.	"Dear, Though the Night Is Gone"
