= Beatsongs =

Studio album by the Blue Aeroplanes
- Released: 1991
- Recorded: February 1991
- Studio: Sunset Sound, Ocean Way
- Genre: Alternative rock, electric folk
- Label: Ensign/Chrysalis
- Producer: Larry Hirsch

The Blue Aeroplanes chronology
Swagger (1990)	Beatsongs (1991)	Life Model (1994)

Beatsongs is an album by the English band the Blue Aeroplanes, released in 1991. Its B-sides were collected on Friendloverplane 2.

The album peaked at No. 33 on the UK Albums Chart.

== Production ==
Recorded at Sunset Sound Recorders and Ocean Way Recording in February 1991, the album was produced by Larry Hirsch. "The Boy in the Bubble" is a cover of the Paul Simon song. Guitar player Rodney Allen sang lead vocal on two tracks. Many guest musicians contributed to Beatsongs.

== Critical reception ==
Professional ratings
Review scores
Source	Rating
AllMusic	4/5 stars
Calgary Herald	B
Chicago Tribune	3.5/4 stars
Record Collector	4/5 stars

The Boston Globe wrote: "Intense and dreamy, acoustic and electric, Beatsongs is yet another fine effort from a fringe 'alternative' band, one that deserves a major push and breakthrough"; the paper later listed Beatsongs as one of the best albums of 1991. The Chicago Tribune determined that "it's electric folk with a vaguely psychedelic underpinning—think of 'Eight Miles High'-era Byrds, early Fairport Convention or the Velvet Underground's third album."

The Calgary Herald deemed the album "a trip ripe with poetic lyrics that whisper and implore, with glistening pop-rock jewels, brooding tunes that untie the knot of anxiety, acoustic/electric guitars that soar eight miles high, the sound of the '60s, of now, of forever." The Times praised the "vivid melodic framework and ... wondrous tonal lustre" of the guitars. The Daily Breeze considered Beatsongs to be the seventh best rock album of 1991.

== Track listing ==
No.	Title	Length
1.	"Huh!"
2.	"Yr Own World"
3.	"Angelwords"
4.	"Fun"
5.	"Cardboard Box"
6.	"My Hurricane"
7.	"Aeroplane Blues"
8.	"Jack Leaves & Back Spring"
9.	"Colour Me"
10.	"Streamers"
11.	"The Boy in the Bubble"
12.	"Sixth Continent"
