= Before the Calm =

Before The Calm

Studio album by Witness
- Released: 12 July 1999
- Recorded: 1998–1999 at Rockfield Studios, Wales
- Genre: Alternative, lo-fi
- Length: 44:01
- Label: Island
- Producer: Phil Vinall

Witness chronology
Before The Calm (1999)	Under A Sun (2001)

Alternate album cover
- US version

Singles from Before The Calm
- 1. "Scars" Released: 1 March 1999; 2. "Audition" Released: 7 June 1999; 3. "Hijacker" Released: 27 September 1999

Before The Calm is the debut album from the Wigan-based band Witness. The album was released in the UK in 1999 via Island Records and spawned three singles for the band in "Scars", "Audition" and "Hijacker", with the former two placing in the Top 75 of the UK singles chart.

== Reception ==
Professional ratings
Review scores
Source	Rating
AllMusic	4/5 stars
Hi-Fi News and Record	(A:1*)
NME	9/10 stars

Upon release, the album was lauded with all-round critical acclaim. The Times noted that the album was "tethered to neither trend nor time" and that Witness themselves were "a band to cherish". Melody Maker praised "the baroque fragility of Gerard Starkie’s vocals and the effortless, atmospheric swell of Ray Chan’s guitars". NME declared Before The Calm "an astonishing debut album; stripped of all affectation", and went on to draw comparisons with Joy Division, DJ Shadow and Radiohead. Other reviewers likened the sound of the LP to Wilco, The Blue Nile, the early releases of R.E.M., along with fellow Wigan band, The Verve. Tim Perry of The Independent thought that Before The Calm encompassed "a satisfyingly undulating 45 minutes of delicate, late-night, soulful songs". AllMusic noted that the album was conducive to repeated listens; "(t)he more one listens to this CD, the more one realizes just how moving and thoughtful songs like "Heirloom," "Scars," and "My Friend Will See Me Through" are". Writing for Hi-Fi News and Record in September 1999, Johnny Black was impressed with the album's immediate accessibility, labelling Before The Calm a "truly wonderful debut" and Witness a band whose music was "moody, rootsy, gutsy, rockin'-folk with attitude". Reviewing the album five months after its American release, Terry Eagan of Ink 19 described Before The Calm as a "dark album" in which "the listener is treated to some of the most beautiful lyrics and singing to appear this year". In drawing comparisons to Velvet Underground and Unknown Pleasures, he also noted that the songs on the album serve to "create an intimacy between the performers and the listener that only the most classic of albums are capable of accomplishing". In a retrospective look at the album in September 2006, Nick Southall of Stylus Magazine noted the depth of Gerard Starkie's lyrics and the "aged sadness" of his vocal delivery, declaring the album "the starkest, coldest, warmest, most haunted, most beautiful collection of songs to ever venture from the North West of England, despite what popular opinion may suggest".

Despite being well received by the music press, album sales were minimal, as the band's co-manager, the late Rob Partridge, contemporaneously noted that "Before The Calm doesn't include a really 'radio-friendly' single, so the promotional opportunities are quite limited".

== Alternative version ==
The US version of the album was issued on MCA Records under the name "Witness UK" and, along with a different album cover and artwork, featured two additional bonus tracks—"Long First Chapter" and "Before The Calm"—which were to be found as b-sides on the UK single releases of "Scars" and "Hijacker", respectively.

== Track listing ==
All tracks written by Witness, except where noted.

No.	Title	Writer(s)	Length
1.	"Second Life"		2:44
2.	"Scars"		2:47
3.	"Freezing Over Morning"		4:41
4.	"Hijacker"		4:14
5.	"My Own Old Song"		3:58
6.	"So Far Gone"		6:12
7.	"Cause And Effect"		3:12
8.	"Heirloom"	Witness/Harte	5:12
9.	"Audition"		3:06
10.	"My Friend Will See Me Through"		4:39
11.	"Still"		3:11

US Bonus Tracks
No.	Title	Length
12.	"Long First Chapter"	3:32
13.	"Before The Calm"	3:04

== Personnel ==
=== Witness ===
- Gerard Starkie – vocals, guitars
- Ray Chan – guitars
- Dylan Keeton – bass
- John Langley – drums

=== Additional musicians ===
- Julian Pransky-Poole – additional instrumentation

=== Recording credits ===
- Phil Vinall – producer
- Paul Read – engineer
- Phelan Kane – programming

== Release history ==
Region	Date	Label	Format	Catalogue
UK	12 July 1999	Island Records	CD	CID 8084, 546 373–2
United States	16 May 2000	MCA Records	CD	088 112 269-2
