= University Technical College Wigan =

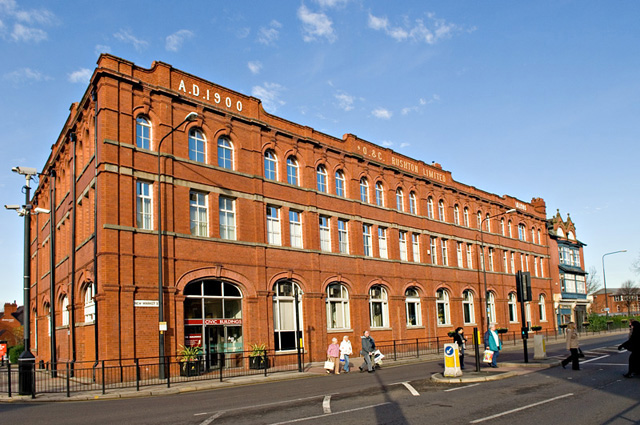

Location
- New Market Street; Wigan, Greater Manchester, WN1 1RP; England; 53°32′56″N 2°38′02″W

Information
- Type: University Technical College; Sixth form
- Established: 2013
- Closed: 2019
- Department for Education URN: 138229 Tables
- Ofsted: Reports
- Principal: Chris Hatherall
- Gender: Coeducational
- Age: 16 to 19
- Enrolment: 112
- Website: http://www.wiganutc.org/

University Technical College Wigan (or Wigan UTC) was a university technical college (UTC) sixth form that opened in Wigan, Greater Manchester, England in September 2013.

Wigan UTC specialised in process engineering and environmental technologies, and was located in the historic O & C Rushton Warehouse building in Wigan town centre. Sponsors of the UTC included the University of Central Lancashire and Wigan & Leigh College.

Wigan UTC had an initial intake of students aged 14 and 16 (academic years 10 and 12) in 2013, however from 2015 the college stopped enrolling under 16's and only offered a sixth form provision.

The college closed in July 2019 as a lack of students made it financially unviable.
