= The Blue Aeroplanes =

English rock band

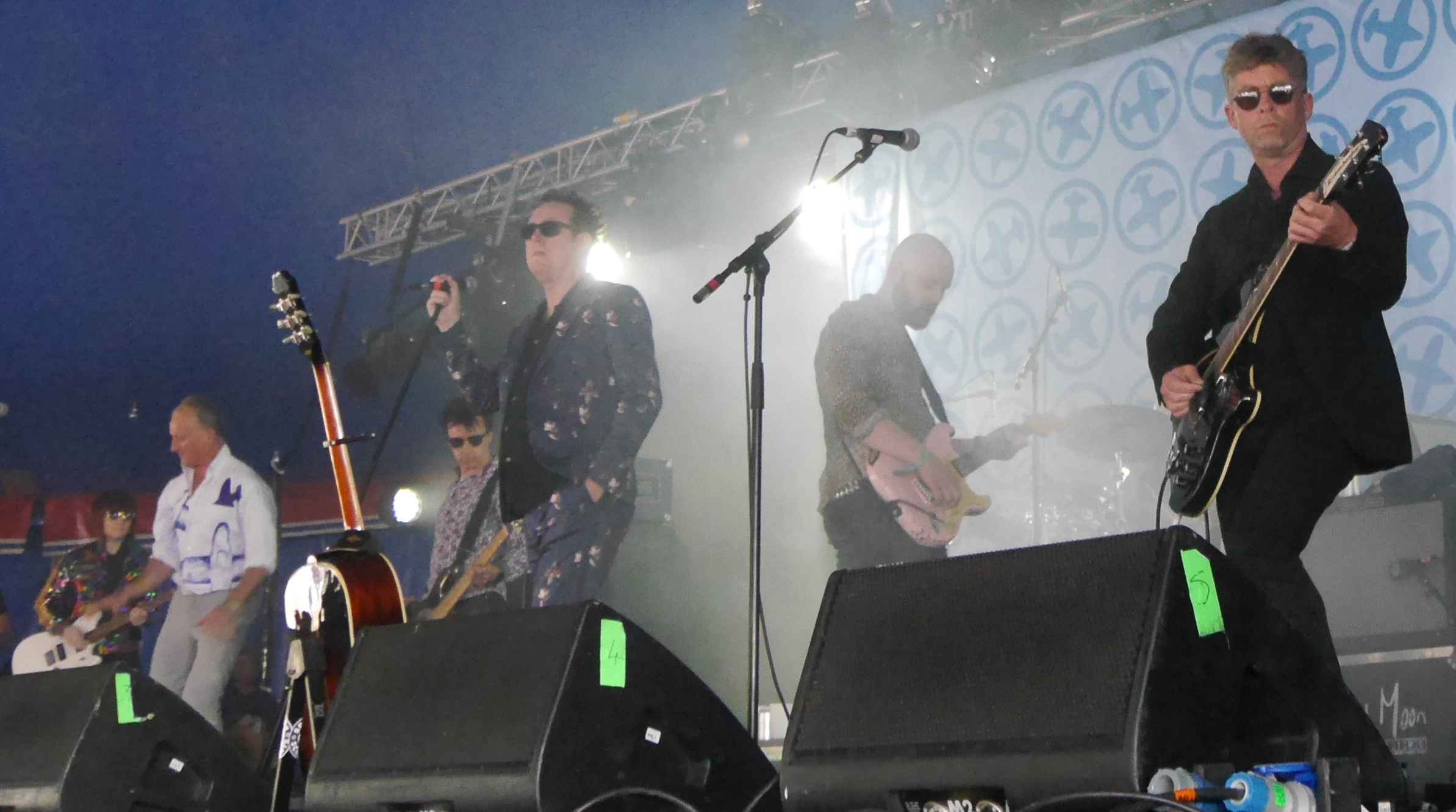
- The Blue Aeroplanes, Glastonbury Festival, 2019

Background information
- Origin: Bristol, England
- Genres: Alternative rock, post-punk, art rock
- Years active: 1981–present
- Labels: Party; Fire; Ensign; Chrysalis; Beggars Banquet; Art Star; Harvest/EMI
- Members: Gerard Langley; John Langley; Wojtek Dmochowski; Chris Sharp; Bec Jevons; Mike Youe; Rita Lynch; Ed Taylor
- Past members: Gerard Starkie; Angelo Bruschini; Rodney Allen; Nick Jacobs; Alex Lee; Max Noble; Ian Kearey; Simon Heathfield
- Website: theblueaeroplanes.com

Cover of Huh!: The Best of, 1987–1992

The Blue Aeroplanes are an English rock band from Bristol, the mainstays of which have been Gerard Langley, brother John Langley, and dancer Wojtek Dmochowski. All three had previously been members of the new wave "art band" Art Objects from 1978 to 1981.

== History ==
The Blue Aeroplanes first performed under that name at the King Street Art Gallery in Bristol in 1981. They consisted mainly of former members of Art Objects, with the addition of Nick Jacobs, former guitarist and vocalist of Southampton band the Exploding Seagulls. The same line-up played three or four concerts over the next couple of years, either at the gallery or for benefits, including a Karl Marx centenary performance at the Victoria Rooms, with the addition of trumpet and didgeridoo. The Blue Aeroplanes' first album, Bop Art, was released on their own Party Records in 1984, and was rapidly picked up by the Abstract (US) and Fire (UK) labels. It contained material that had been considered as a follow-up to Art Objects' only album, Bagpipe Music. Gerard Langley's largely spoken poetic lyrics were combined with a heavily guitar-centric band that went on to release Tolerance (1985) and Spitting Out Miracles (1987) and several singles and EPs whose B-sides were brought together in the compilation FriendLoverPlane (1988), all on the Fire label.

On 24 February 1990, the band released their most critically acclaimed album, Swagger, this time on a major label Chrysalis/Ensign. This was followed by Beatsongs, which was recorded in the United States and released in 1991. It was produced by Larry Hirsch. This second album on the major label was their highest charting, reaching no. 33 in the UK Albums Chart. A second compilation of rare B-sides and out-takes, FriendLoverPlane2 (Up in a Down World), was released in 1992.

The follow-up to Beatsongs was delayed until 1994, when the album Life Model was released on the Beggars Banquet label; it was followed by Rough Music in 1995. "Broken & Mended" from Life Model was the band's last single to reach the charts, and is a favourite at gigs. A long break and another label change to ArtStar preceded the release of Cavaliers in 2000. Following negotiations with EMI, which now owned the rights to Swagger and Beatsongs, the Blue Aeroplanes made a surprise return to this major label. EMI re-released Swagger Deluxe as a 2-CD version in January 2006. This was followed by an album of new material called Altitude later that year, released on EMI's Harvest imprint. The group then recorded an album of cover versions of classic tracks that were originally recorded by artists signed to the Harvest label. The album, called Harvester, was released by EMI/Harvest in 2007.

As well as the two FriendLoverPlane compilations, several other compilations have been released in recent years. Fruit (Live 1983–1995) was released on Fire Records in 1996, and covered 12 years of live performances recorded at various venues. Huh! The Best of The Blue Aeroplanes (1987–1992) was released by EMI/Chrysalis in 1997 and featured many of the songs from Swagger and Beatsongs. Also in 1997, Warhol's 15 – The Best of the Blue Aeroplanes (1985–1988) was released and covered the preceding period when the band was signed to Fire Records. Then in 2001, ArtStar released Weird Sh*t which featured both rare tracks and alternative versions of some of the band's best-known songs from Swagger through to Cavaliers.

In 2008 and 2009, limited-edition live albums were released and sold at the annual Christmas gig at Fiddlers in Bristol. Live in Cheltenham (2008) and Skyscrapers (2009) were limited to just 100 copies each and each featured songs not included on the other live CD. Their Christmas gig moved to The Fleece a few years later and is a staple in their touring calendar.

The band released a new album Welcome, Stranger! in January 2017 through Pledgemusic. This was followed up by "Culture Gun". Written and recorded over three years, the much-delayed – mainly due to vocalist Gerard Langley being hospitalized with cancer – album was released on 28 April 2023, by Last Night From Glasgow.

In 2026 the band recorded a new album, “Tales From The Silver Lounge”, at Bristol’s Humm Studios. The songs are “based on overheard conversations between the clientele of The Silver Lounge, a rather louche café/bar in an unnamed city on an unknown planet much like ours”. The release date is Friday 27 November 2026.

== Live performances ==
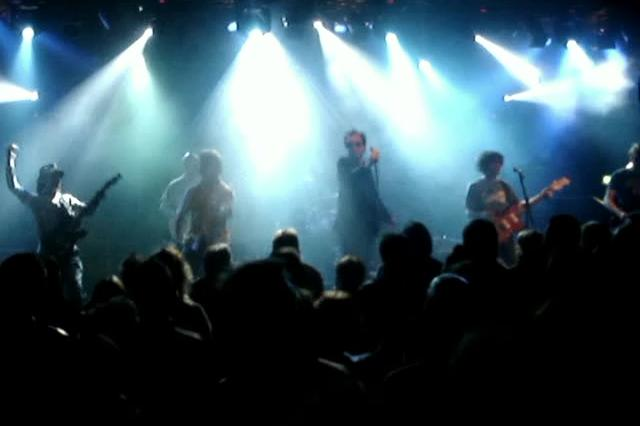
The Blue Aeroplanes, 2006

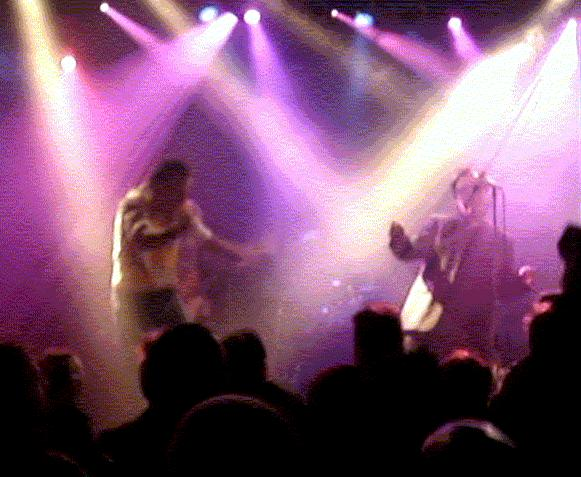
Lead singer Gerard Langley (right) and Polish dancer Wojciech Dmochowski, 2006

The Blue Aeroplanes have played headlining gigs in small indie venues as well as supporting big acts such as R.E.M. and Siouxsie and the Banshees on major international tours, frontman Gerard Langley always wearing his trademark shades even at night in dark venues. Performances include the band's 1992 appearance at Glastonbury which was broadcast on BBC Radio 1, the finale at the Hammersmith Apollo when 12 guitarists were seen on stage performing "Breaking in My Heart" and their annual appearance at Fiddlers in Bristol which has now been relocated to the band's own venue, The Fleece.

In February 2016 the band played at the 6music festival at Colston Hall's Lantern venue, being introduced by Gideon Coe and in April 2016 they were personally chosen by curator Stewart Lee to play the ATP festival at Pontins Prestatyn.

In 2019 the band performed at the Glastonbury Festival on the Avalon Stage.

== Discography ==
=== Studio albums ===
- Bop Art (1984), Party
- Tolerance (1985), Fire
- Spitting Out Miracles (1987), Fire
- Swagger (1990), Ensign
- Beatsongs (1991), Ensign
- Life Model (1994), Beggars Banquet
- Rough Music (1995), Beggars Banquet
- Cavaliers & Roundheads (2000), Swarf Finger
- Altitude (2006), EMI/Harvest
- Harvester (2007), EMI/Harvest
- Anti-Gravity (2011), Art Star/Albino
- Welcome, Stranger! (2017), Art Star
- Culture Gun (2022), Art Star
- Tales From The Silver Lounge (2026), Art Star

=== Live albums ===
- Fruit (Live 1983-1995) (1996), Fire
- Access All Areas – Live (CD & DVD) (2015), Edsel

=== Compilation albums ===
- Friendloverplane (1988), Fire
- World View Blue (1990), Chrysalis
- Friendloverplane 2 (Up in a Down World) (1992), Ensign
- Weird Shit (One-Offs False Starts & Side Roads To The Wrong Part Of Town) (1996), Self-release
- Huh! The Best of The Blue Aeroplanes 1987–1992 (1997), Chrysalis
- Warhol's 15 – The Best of The Blue Aeroplanes 1985–1988 (2002), Nectar
- Magical Realism – the Best of The Blue Aeroplanes 1985–2025 (2025)
- Outsider Art – The Other Best of The Blue Aeroplanes 1985–2025 (2025)

=== Singles and EPs ===
- "Action Painting & Other Original Works Of..." (EP) (1985), Fire Records (FIRE 2) - Action Painting / Le Petit Cadeau De Don Juan / Ashtrays From Mt. Etna / Police (38 Divinity)
- "Lover & Confidante And Other Stories of Travel Religion & Heartbreak" (EP) (1985), Fire Records (FIRE 8) - Lover & Confidante / Who Built This Station In The Midwest / Weird Heart / Breaking In My Heart
- "Tolerance" (EP) (1986), Fire Records BLAZE 12T - Tolerance (Remix) / Teaching English (Through Sex And Death) / The Couple In The Next Room / Complete Blessing
- "Bury Your Love Like Treasure" (EP) (1987), Fire Records BLAZE 23T - Bury Your Love Like Treasure / King Of The Soap Box / Vice King's Son / Continually Torn Apart
- "The Janice Long Session" (EP) (1988), Strange fruit / Night Trax SFNT009 -
- "Veils of Colour" (EP) (1988), Fire Records BLAZE 24T - Veils Of Colour / Spitting Out Miracles (Re-mixed) / Arriving / Built In A Day
- "Jacket Hangs" (1990), Ensign ENY628
- "...And Stones" (1990), Ensign ENY632 - ... And Stones (Remix Edit) / ... And Stones (Album version)
- "The Loved" (EP) (1990), Ensign ENY636 - You (Are Loved) / You're Going To Need Somebody / Sweet Jane / World View Blue (Acoustic Version)
- "Yr Own World" (1991), Ensign ENY647
- "The Boy in the Bubble" (1991), Ensign ENY649
- "Stranger" (1992), Flexi-disc given out at Bristol University gig.
- "Up in a Down World" (EP) (1993), Fantastic Plastic FP002 - Up In A Down World / Fun (Acoustic) / Breaking In My Heart / Mean Time
- "Broken & Mended EP" (1994), Beggars Banquet BBQ26T - Broken & Mended / Love Is / Star-Cross'd / Get Out!
- "Detective Song" (1994), Beggars Banquet BBQ39
- "Sugared Almond EP" (1995), Beggars Banquet BBQ53 - Sugared Almond (New Version) / Scared (Scared Mix) / Bad Moon Rising / Broken And Mended (Acoustic Version)
- "China Brilliance Automotive" (2010), Albino Two Recordings ALBTW010
- "Dead Tree! Dead Tree!" (2016), ArtStar AS CS 002

=== Compilation appearances ===
- Bludgeoned (1985). Includes different version of "Action Painting".
- Imminent Episode One (1985), Food. Includes an alternate version of "Outback Jazz".
- On the Dotted Line (1997), EMI. Two separate LPs - (There) included "Gunning the Works (live)" and (Here) included "Tolerance (live)"
- Great Fire of London (1989), Fire. Includes the uncredited version of Dave Brubeck's "Unsquare Dance" (an out-take from Bop Art), and a different version of "Gunning The Works".
- Lime Lizards (1991), CAS. Includes "Autumn Journal XV".
- Volume 2 (1991). Includes the original album version of "Aeroplane Blues" (pre-overdubs, etc.).
- Ruby Trax (1992), NME. Includes "Bad Moon Rising".
- NME Presents Viva! Eight (1992), NME. Includes "Yr Own World (live)".
- The Indie Scene 1985 – The Story of British Independent Music (1992). Includes "Action Painting".

== Lineups ==
Key

"P"
Primary member
"S"
Supporting member

Album lineups for The Blue Aeroplanes
Player	Bop Art	Tolerance	Spitting Out Miracles	Friendlover- plane	Swagger	Beatsongs	Friendlover- plane 2	Life Model	Rough Music	Cavaliers	Altitude	Anti-Gravity	Welcome, Stranger!	Culture Gun	Tales from the Silver Lounge
Alex Acuna	—N/a	—N/a	—N/a	—N/a	—N/a	—N/a	S	—N/a	—N/a	—N/a	—N/a	—N/a	—N/a	—N/a	—N/a
Joe Allen	—N/a	—N/a	—N/a	—N/a	—N/a	—N/a	—N/a	—N/a	P	—N/a	P	—N/a	—N/a	S	—N/a
Rodney Allen	—N/a	—N/a	—N/a	S	P	P	P	P	P	—N/a	—N/a	—N/a	—N/a	P	—N/a
Johnny Baker	—N/a	—N/a	—N/a	—N/a	—N/a	—N/a	—N/a	S	—N/a	—N/a	—N/a	—N/a	—N/a	—N/a	—N/a
Bill Bell	—N/a	—N/a	S	S	—N/a	—N/a	—N/a	—N/a	—N/a	—N/a	—N/a	—N/a	—N/a	—N/a	—N/a
Richard Bell	—N/a	P	P	P	—N/a	—N/a	—N/a	—N/a	—N/a	—N/a	—N/a	—N/a	—N/a	S	—N/a
Tracey Bowen	—N/a	—N/a	—N/a	—N/a	—N/a	—N/a	—N/a	S	—N/a	—N/a	—N/a	—N/a	—N/a	—N/a	—N/a
Vivian Bowen	—N/a	—N/a	—N/a	—N/a	—N/a	—N/a	—N/a	S	—N/a	—N/a	—N/a	—N/a	—N/a	—N/a	—N/a
Bob Bradley	—N/a	—N/a	—N/a	—N/a	—N/a	—N/a	—N/a	P	P	—N/a	—N/a	—N/a	—N/a	—N/a	—N/a
Paul Bradley	—N/a	—N/a	—N/a	—N/a	—N/a	—N/a	—N/a	—N/a	S	—N/a	—N/a	—N/a	—N/a	—N/a	—N/a
Angelo Bruschini	—N/a	S	—N/a	P	P	P	P	P	—N/a	—N/a	—N/a	—N/a	—N/a	S	—N/a
Antoinette Burrell	—N/a	—N/a	—N/a	—N/a	—N/a	—N/a	—N/a	S	—N/a	—N/a	—N/a	—N/a	—N/a	—N/a	—N/a
Steve Bush	S	—N/a	—N/a	—N/a	—N/a	—N/a	—N/a	—N/a	—N/a	—N/a	—N/a	—N/a	—N/a	—N/a	S
Dan Catsis	S	—N/a	—N/a	—N/a	—N/a	—N/a	—N/a	—N/a	—N/a	—N/a	—N/a	—N/a	—N/a	—N/a	—N/a
Luke Cawthra	—N/a	—N/a	—N/a	—N/a	—N/a	—N/a	—N/a	—N/a	—N/a	—N/a	—N/a	—N/a	—N/a	S	—N/a
Dave Chapman	—N/a	P	P	P	—N/a	—N/a	—N/a	—N/a	—N/a	—N/a	—N/a	—N/a	—N/a	—N/a	—N/a
George Claridge	—N/a	—N/a	—N/a	—N/a	—N/a	—N/a	—N/a	—N/a	S	—N/a	—N/a	—N/a	—N/a	—N/a	—N/a
Ashley Clarke	—N/a	—N/a	—N/a	—N/a	—N/a	—N/a	—N/a	—N/a	—N/a	—N/a	—N/a	—N/a	—N/a	S	—N/a
Christian Clarke	—N/a	—N/a	—N/a	S	—N/a	—N/a	—N/a	—N/a	—N/a	—N/a	—N/a	—N/a	—N/a	—N/a	—N/a
Ruth Cochrane	—N/a	P	P	P	—N/a	—N/a	—N/a	—N/a	—N/a	—N/a	—N/a	—N/a	—N/a	—N/a	—N/a
John Cornick	—N/a	—N/a	—N/a	—N/a	—N/a	—N/a	—N/a	S	—N/a	—N/a	—N/a	—N/a	—N/a	—N/a	—N/a
Richard Crabtree	—N/a	—N/a	—N/a	—N/a	—N/a	—N/a	—N/a	S	—N/a	—N/a	—N/a	—N/a	—N/a	—N/a	—N/a
Simon Crump	S	—N/a	—N/a	—N/a	—N/a	—N/a	—N/a	—N/a	—N/a	—N/a	—N/a	—N/a	—N/a	—N/a	—N/a
Fiona Davies	—N/a	—N/a	—N/a	—N/a	—N/a	—N/a	—N/a	S	—N/a	—N/a	—N/a	—N/a	—N/a	—N/a	—N/a
Stephen Davies	S	—N/a	—N/a	—N/a	—N/a	—N/a	—N/a	—N/a	—N/a	—N/a	—N/a	—N/a	—N/a	—N/a	—N/a
Alexander Dmochowski	—N/a	—N/a	—N/a	—N/a	—N/a	—N/a	—N/a	—N/a	—N/a	—N/a	—N/a	—N/a	—N/a	S	S
Jedrej Dmochowski	—N/a	S	—N/a	S	—N/a	—N/a	—N/a	—N/a	—N/a	—N/a	—N/a	—N/a	—N/a	—N/a	—N/a
Wojtek Dmochowski	P	P	P	P	P	P	P	P	P	P	P	P	P	P	P
Patrick Duff	—N/a	—N/a	—N/a	—N/a	—N/a	—N/a	—N/a	—N/a	S	—N/a	—N/a	—N/a	—N/a	—N/a	—N/a
Chris Evans	—N/a	—N/a	—N/a	—N/a	—N/a	—N/a	—N/a	S	—N/a	—N/a	—N/a	—N/a	—N/a	—N/a	—N/a
Nigel Eaton	—N/a	—N/a	S	—N/a	S	—N/a	—N/a	—N/a	—N/a	—N/a	—N/a	—N/a	—N/a	—N/a	—N/a
Rhian Evans	—N/a	—N/a	—N/a	—N/a	—N/a	—N/a	—N/a	S	—N/a	—N/a	—N/a	—N/a	—N/a	—N/a	—N/a
Mark Espiner	—N/a	—N/a	S	S	—N/a	—N/a	—N/a	—N/a	—N/a	—N/a	—N/a	—N/a	—N/a	—N/a	—N/a
Pat Fish (Jazz Butcher)	—N/a	—N/a	—N/a	—N/a	—N/a	S	S	—N/a	P	—N/a	—N/a	—N/a	—N/a	—N/a	—N/a
Alexandra Frean	—N/a	—N/a	—N/a	—N/a	—N/a	—N/a	—N/a	S	—N/a	—N/a	—N/a	—N/a	—N/a	—N/a	—N/a
Matthew Gale	—N/a	—N/a	S	S	—N/a	—N/a	—N/a	—N/a	—N/a	—N/a	—N/a	—N/a	—N/a	—N/a	—N/a
Roger Goslyn	—N/a	S	—N/a	S	—N/a	—N/a	—N/a	—N/a	—N/a	—N/a	—N/a	—N/a	—N/a	—N/a	—N/a
Caroline Halcrow	—N/a	—N/a	—N/a	P	—N/a	—N/a	—N/a	—N/a	—N/a	—N/a	—N/a	—N/a	—N/a	—N/a	—N/a
Simon Heathfield	—N/a	—N/a	—N/a	P	—N/a	—N/a	—N/a	—N/a	—N/a	—N/a	—N/a	—N/a	—N/a	—N/a	—N/a
Boo Hewerdine	—N/a	—N/a	—N/a	—N/a	S	—N/a	—N/a	—N/a	—N/a	—N/a	—N/a	—N/a	—N/a	—N/a	—N/a
Clare Hirst	—N/a	—N/a	—N/a	—N/a	S	—N/a	—N/a	—N/a	—N/a	—N/a	—N/a	—N/a	—N/a	—N/a	—N/a
Susie Hug	—N/a	—N/a	—N/a	—N/a	—N/a	—N/a	—N/a	S	S	—N/a	—N/a	—N/a	—N/a	—N/a	—N/a
Nick Jacobs	P	P	P	P	S	—N/a	—N/a	—N/a	—N/a	—N/a	—N/a	—N/a	—N/a	—N/a	—N/a
Luís Jardim	—N/a	—N/a	—N/a	—N/a	S	—N/a	—N/a	—N/a	—N/a	—N/a	—N/a	—N/a	—N/a	—N/a	—N/a
Bec Jevons	—N/a	—N/a	—N/a	—N/a	—N/a	—N/a	—N/a	—N/a	—N/a	—N/a	—N/a	—N/a	P	P	P
Tom Johnson	—N/a	—N/a	—N/a	—N/a	—N/a	—N/a	—N/a	—N/a	S	—N/a	—N/a	—N/a	—N/a	—N/a	—N/a
Rachel Jones	—N/a	—N/a	—N/a	—N/a	—N/a	—N/a	—N/a	S	—N/a	—N/a	—N/a	—N/a	—N/a	—N/a	—N/a
Francis Kane	—N/a	—N/a	—N/a	—N/a	—N/a	—N/a	—N/a	—N/a	S	—N/a	—N/a	—N/a	—N/a	—N/a	—N/a
Ian Kearey	P	S	—N/a	P	S	S	S	P	S	—N/a	—N/a	—N/a	—N/a	—N/a	—N/a
Tim Keegan	—N/a	—N/a	—N/a	—N/a	—N/a	—N/a	—N/a	—N/a	S	—N/a	—N/a	—N/a	—N/a	—N/a	—N/a
J.J. Key	S	—N/a	—N/a	—N/a	—N/a	S	—N/a	—N/a	—N/a	—N/a	—N/a	—N/a	—N/a	—N/a	—N/a
Robin Key	S	—N/a	—N/a	—N/a	—N/a	—N/a	—N/a	—N/a	—N/a	—N/a	—N/a	—N/a	—N/a	—N/a	—N/a
Dave King	—N/a	—N/a	S	—N/a	—N/a	—N/a	—N/a	—N/a	—N/a	—N/a	—N/a	—N/a	—N/a	—N/a	—N/a
Kenny Lacey	—N/a	—N/a	—N/a	—N/a	—N/a	—N/a	—N/a	S	—N/a	—N/a	—N/a	—N/a	—N/a	—N/a	—N/a
Elizabeth Lane	—N/a	—N/a	—N/a	—N/a	—N/a	—N/a	S	S	—N/a	—N/a	—N/a	—N/a	—N/a	—N/a	—N/a
Andrew Lang	—N/a	—N/a	—N/a	—N/a	—N/a	—N/a	—N/a	S	—N/a	—N/a	—N/a	—N/a	—N/a	—N/a	—N/a
Gerard Langley	P	P	P	P	P	P	P	P	P	P	P	P	P	P	P
John Langley	P	P	P	P	P	—N/a	P	—N/a	P	P	P	P	P	P	P
Alex Lee	—N/a	—N/a	—N/a	—N/a	P	P	P	—N/a	P	—N/a	—N/a	—N/a	—N/a	—N/a	—N/a
Loki Lillistone	—N/a	—N/a	—N/a	—N/a	—N/a	—N/a	—N/a	—N/a	—N/a	—N/a	—N/a	P	—N/a	—N/a	—N/a
Jeremy Little	—N/a	—N/a	—N/a	—N/a	—N/a	—N/a	—N/a	S	—N/a	—N/a	—N/a	—N/a	—N/a	—N/a	—N/a
Charlie Llewellin	S	—N/a	—N/a	—N/a	—N/a	—N/a	—N/a	—N/a	—N/a	—N/a	—N/a	—N/a	—N/a	—N/a	—N/a
Georgia Lowe	—N/a	—N/a	—N/a	—N/a	—N/a	—N/a	—N/a	S	—N/a	—N/a	—N/a	—N/a	—N/a	—N/a	—N/a
Rita Lynch	—N/a	—N/a	—N/a	—N/a	—N/a	—N/a	—N/a	—N/a	—N/a	—N/a	—N/a	P	—N/a	—N/a	P
David Mansfield	—N/a	—N/a	—N/a	—N/a	—N/a	S	—N/a	—N/a	—N/a	—N/a	—N/a	—N/a	—N/a	—N/a	—N/a
Jerry Marotta	—N/a	—N/a	—N/a	—N/a	—N/a	S	S	—N/a	—N/a	—N/a	—N/a	—N/a	—N/a	—N/a	—N/a
Andy McCreeth	—N/a	—N/a	—N/a	—N/a	P	P	P	S	—N/a	—N/a	—N/a	—N/a	—N/a	—N/a	—N/a
Brodie McGuire	—N/a	—N/a	—N/a	—N/a	—N/a	—N/a	—N/a	—N/a	—N/a	—N/a	—N/a	—N/a	—N/a	S	—N/a
Paul Mulreany	—N/a	—N/a	—N/a	—N/a	—N/a	P	P	P	P	—N/a	—N/a	—N/a	—N/a	—N/a	—N/a
Dave Newton	—N/a	—N/a	—N/a	—N/a	—N/a	—N/a	—N/a	S	S	—N/a	—N/a	—N/a	—N/a	—N/a	—N/a
Max Noble	—N/a	—N/a	—N/a	—N/a	—N/a	—N/a	—N/a	—N/a	S	P	P	P	—N/a	—N/a	—N/a
Iain O'Higgins	—N/a	S	—N/a	—N/a	—N/a	—N/a	—N/a	—N/a	—N/a	—N/a	—N/a	—N/a	—N/a	—N/a	—N/a
Nick Powell	—N/a	—N/a	—N/a	—N/a	—N/a	—N/a	—N/a	—N/a	S	—N/a	—N/a	—N/a	—N/a	—N/a	—N/a
Roger Power	—N/a	—N/a	—N/a	—N/a	—N/a	—N/a	—N/a	—N/a	P	—N/a	—N/a	—N/a	—N/a	—N/a	—N/a
Simon Preston	S	—N/a	—N/a	—N/a	—N/a	—N/a	—N/a	—N/a	—N/a	—N/a	—N/a	—N/a	—N/a	—N/a	—N/a
Graham Russell	—N/a	—N/a	—N/a	—N/a	—N/a	—N/a	—N/a	—N/a	P	—N/a	—N/a	—N/a	—N/a	—N/a	—N/a
Chris Sharp	—N/a	—N/a	—N/a	—N/a	—N/a	—N/a	—N/a	—N/a	—N/a	—N/a	—N/a	P	P	P	P
Andy Sheppard	—N/a	—N/a	—N/a	—N/a	—N/a	—N/a	—N/a	—N/a	S	—N/a	—N/a	—N/a	—N/a	—N/a	—N/a
Michelle Shocked	—N/a	—N/a	S	—N/a	—N/a	—N/a	—N/a	—N/a	—N/a	—N/a	—N/a	—N/a	—N/a	—N/a	—N/a
Anna Slatanova	—N/a	—N/a	—N/a	—N/a	—N/a	—N/a	—N/a	—N/a	—N/a	—N/a	—N/a	—N/a	—N/a	S	—N/a
Bill Stair	S	—N/a	—N/a	—N/a	—N/a	—N/a	—N/a	—N/a	—N/a	—N/a	—N/a	—N/a	—N/a	—N/a	—N/a
John Stapleton	—N/a	P	P	P	—N/a	—N/a	—N/a	—N/a	—N/a	—N/a	—N/a	—N/a	—N/a	—N/a	—N/a
Gerard Starkie	—N/a	—N/a	—N/a	—N/a	—N/a	—N/a	—N/a	—N/a	P	—N/a	P	P	P	S	—N/a
Michael Stipe	—N/a	—N/a	—N/a	—N/a	S	—N/a	—N/a	—N/a	—N/a	—N/a	—N/a	—N/a	—N/a	—N/a	—N/a
Greg Stoddard	—N/a	—N/a	—N/a	—N/a	—N/a	—N/a	—N/a	—N/a	—N/a	—N/a	—N/a	—N/a	—N/a	S	—N/a
Elaine Summers	—N/a	—N/a	—N/a	—N/a	—N/a	S	—N/a	—N/a	—N/a	—N/a	—N/a	—N/a	—N/a	—N/a	—N/a
Andy Sutor	—N/a	—N/a	—N/a	—N/a	—N/a	—N/a	—N/a	—N/a	—N/a	—N/a	—N/a	—N/a	—N/a	S	—N/a
Ed Taylor	—N/a	—N/a	—N/a	—N/a	—N/a	—N/a	—N/a	—N/a	—N/a	—N/a	—N/a	—N/a	—N/a	—N/a	P
Danny Timms	—N/a	—N/a	—N/a	—N/a	—N/a	S	—N/a	—N/a	—N/a	—N/a	—N/a	—N/a	—N/a	—N/a	—N/a
Neti Vaandrager	—N/a	—N/a	S	—N/a	—N/a	—N/a	—N/a	—N/a	—N/a	—N/a	—N/a	—N/a	—N/a	—N/a	—N/a
Marcus Williams	—N/a	—N/a	—N/a	—N/a	—N/a	—N/a	—N/a	—N/a	P	—N/a	—N/a	—N/a	—N/a	—N/a	—N/a
Nick Williams	—N/a	—N/a	—N/a	—N/a	—N/a	—N/a	—N/a	S	—N/a	—N/a	—N/a	—N/a	—N/a	—N/a	—N/a
Sharon Williams	—N/a	—N/a	—N/a	—N/a	—N/a	—N/a	—N/a	S	—N/a	—N/a	—N/a	—N/a	—N/a	—N/a	—N/a
Hazel Winter	—N/a	—N/a	—N/a	—N/a	—N/a	—N/a	P	P	—N/a	—N/a	—N/a	—N/a	—N/a	—N/a	—N/a
Tony Wrafter	S	—N/a	—N/a	S	—N/a	—N/a	—N/a	—N/a	—N/a	—N/a	—N/a	—N/a	—N/a	—N/a	—N/a
Jon Wygens	—N/a	—N/a	—N/a	—N/a	—N/a	—N/a	—N/a	—N/a	P	—N/a	—N/a	—N/a	—N/a	—N/a	—N/a
Mike Youé	—N/a	—N/a	—N/a	—N/a	—N/a	—N/a	—N/a	—N/a	—N/a	—N/a	—N/a	—N/a	P	P	P

== See also ==
- List of bands from Bristol
- List of record labels from Bristol
- Bristol record labels
