= Adil Jussawalla =

Indian poet and critic (born 1940)

Adil Jehangir Jussawalla
- Born: 8 April 1940 (age 86); Mumbai, India
- Education: University College, Oxford
- Occupations: Poet, Magazine Editor, Translator
- Writing career
- Period: 1957–present
- Genres: Poetry, Essays
- Notable works: Land's End; Missing Person; Sea Breeze Bombay; Trying to Say Goodbye
- Notable awards: Sahitya Akademi Award (2014)

Adil Jehangir Jussawalla (born 8 April 1940, Mumbai) is an Indian poet, magazine editor and translator. He has written two books of poetry, Land's End and Missing Person.

Sea Breeze Bombay is a fine, city poem by this poet. It is actually a response to the historical incident of partition in the year 1947 according to the poet, Bombay is a 'Surrogate City'. It provided shelter to numerous refugees after partition, during which there were many riots in India. Thousands of people were killed and many became homeless. The city Bombay acted as a substitute or surrogate mother to all refugees.

In the poem 'Sea Breeze Bombay' the poet presents a picture of the suffering of the refugees. These people from the north got relief in the worst heat. In the city many communities were reformed. In the hot sun a cool breeze gives pleasant, soothing experience. In the same way, the city Bombay also provided pleasant experience to all the refugees.

== Biography ==
He was born to a Parsi family and completed his primary education at the Cathedral and John Connon School in 1956. He then attended the Architectural Association School of Architecture in London from 1957–58. Later, he studied at University College, Oxford, receiving his M.A. in 1964.

He worked briefly as a substitute teacher for the Greater London Council, then became a language teacher at the EF International Language Centre; a post he held until 1969. He then returned to Mumbai, where he taught at several colleges, becoming a lecturer in English language and literature at St. Xavier's College in 1972.

He was an Honorary Fellow of the International Writing Program at the University of Iowa in 1976. After that, he focused on journalism, serving as the book review editor at The Indian Express from 1980–81 and literary editor for The Express Magazine from 1980–82. In 1987, he became the literary editor for Debonair, a magazine originally modeled after Playboy. In 1989, he was promoted to editor and served in that position for several years, after which he returned to his writing career. He has also translated several works by Gulam Mohammed Sheikh. Together with Arvind Krishna Mehrotra, Arun Kolatkar and Gieve Patel, he helped create "Clearing House", a poet's publishing co-operative.

In 2014, he was presented with the Sahitya Akademi Award for his book of poetry, Trying to Say Goodbye.

== Selected works ==
- New Writing in India, Penguin Books Ltd, 1974, 978-0140036459
- Trying to Say Goodbye, Almost Island Books, 2011 ISBN 978-81-921295-0-1
- The Right Kind of Dog, Duckbill Books, 2013 ISBN 978-81-925948-5-9
- Maps for a Mortal Moon: Essays and Entertainments (edited by Jerry Pinto), Aleph Books, 2014 ISBN 978-93-82277-67-5
- I Dreamt a Horse Fell From the Sky, a collection of poetry and prose, Hachette, 2015 ISBN 978-93-5009-858-5
- The Magic Hand of Chance, Paperwall Publishing, 2021, 978-8195378739

== Anthologies ==
Jussawalla's work appears in:

- The Oxford India Anthology of Twelve Modern Indian Poets (1992) ed. by Arvind Krishna Mehrotra and published by Oxford University Press, New Delhi
- The Golden Treasure of Writers Workshop Poetry (2008) ed. by Rubana Huq and published by Writers Workshop, Calcutta
- Converse: Contemporary English Poetry by Indians (2022) ed. by Sudeep Sen published by Pippa Rann Books, London
