= Raw Umber (memoir) =

Indian memoir

- Author: Sara Rai
- Language: English
- Publisher: Context
- Publication date: 30 January 2023
- Publication place: India
- Pages: 240
- ISBN: 9789395767514

Raw Umber is an Indian memoir written by Sara Rai. It was published by Context on 30 January 2023.

== Reception ==
The Hindu wrote in a review "Narrated through essays, Rai’s luminiscent touch is evident from the first one, ‘Palimpsest’, in which the boundary between memory and imagination blurs as she goes around her family home in Allahabad."

Vogue India wrote in a review "The essays in Raw Umber are, in some ways, a document of Rai’s family—the large political events that tided over the mundane everydayness of life in early 20th-century Allahabad."

The Moneycontrol wrote in a review "Rai writes beautifully about her multicultural roots, sharing anecdotes and practices that may escape the increasingly polarising India of today".
