= Gerard Starkie =

- Origin: Wigan, England
- Genres: Indie, Americana
- Occupations: Musician, songwriter
- Instruments: Vocals, guitar
- Years active: 1997–present
- Formerly of: Witness

Gerard Starkie is an English musician and former lead singer of Witness. After Witness split up in 2004, Starkie went on to record his debut album Drawbridge with former Witness band members, releasing it as a free download on his official MySpace site.

Gerard released his second album Potions in July 2011 on UK indie label Lupine Records.

Gerard has had several of his songs picked up for use on TV and film around the world. "Here's One For You" featured on the soundtrack to American Pie 2, whilst "Closing Up" featured on Cougar Town in 2009.

On 30 June 2026 Starkie released the vinyl album Before The Calm Acoustic via Lupine Records, digital available on Bandcamp.
