= Art Objects (band) =

British post-punk band

- Origin: Bristol, England
- Genres: Post-punk
- Years active: 1978–1981
- Labels: Cherry Red, Heartbeat, Fried Egg
- Spinoffs: The Blue Aeroplanes
- Past members: Gerard Langley; Jonathan J. Key; Robin Key; Bill Stair; John Langley; Wojtek Dmochowski
- Website: myspace page

Art Objects were a Bristol-based post-punk band who later evolved into the Blue Aeroplanes. Between 1978 and 1981 they released two singles and one album.

== History ==
Art Objects played their first gig at Bristol's Ashton Court Festival (mini-stage) in the summer of 1978. At that time, the lineup consisted of poet Gerard Langley, dancer Wojtek Dmochowski, and guitarist Jonathan J. Key (AKA Jonjo) producing a variety of musical and non-musical sounds from his Vox AC-30 and WEM Copicat. Though initially unpopular, they soon became a local fixture as an opening act - no sound-check or drum set-up were required.

The drum-free era ended when Gerard's brother John sat in for three numbers at a show in June 1979. A week later Bill Stair added bass to the same three songs at a Hope Centre gig. Shortly after that Jonjo's brother Robin joined on guitar, and the line-up was complete.

Local indie label Fried Egg Records released their first single, the "Hard Objects EP" in early 1980. A second single, "Showing Off (To Impress The Girls)", was released by Heartbeat Records soon after.

In the summer of 1980, the Art Objects recorded Bagpipe Music, their only album, at Crescent Studios, Bath. Heartbeat released it one year later. Shortly after this, the band broke up.

Gerard, John and Wojtek recruited some new musicians and played a few more gigs using the Art Objects name before re-emerging as the Blue Aeroplanes. Bop Art, their first album, consisted partly of late Art Objects songs and demos, and featured contributions from Jonjo, Robin and Bill.

In 2007, Bagpipe Music was re-released by Cherry Red Records.

== Members ==
- Gerard Langley - vocals
- Jonathan J. Key - guitar
- Robin Key - guitar
- Bill Stair - bass
- John Langley - drums
- Wojtek Dmochowski - dancer

== Discography ==
=== Albums ===
- Bagpipe Music (1981), Heartbeat Records, reissued on Cherry Red, 2007

=== Singles ===
- "Hard Objects" b/w "Biblioteque/Fit of Pique" (1980), Fried Egg Records
- "Showing Off to Impress the Girls" b/w "Our Silver Sister" (live) (1980), Heartbeat Records
