= Potions (album) =

Studio album by Gerard Starkie
- Released: July 4, 2011
- Genre: indie, americana
- Length: 34:57
- Label: Lupine Records
- Producer: Matt Sampson

Gerard Starkie chronology
Drawbridge (2006)	Potions (2011)

Professional ratings
Review scores
Source	Rating
This Feeling	4/5 stars
Uncut (magazine)	4/5 stars
Manchester Music	3.5/5 stars

Potions is the first album from Gerard Starkie, formerly of Witness. It is the follow-up to the album Drawbridge that was made available for free download in 2006.

Potions was released on Lupine Records in July 2011. All songs were written by Starkie, but various musicians feature on the album such as Joe Allen, Joe Gallimore, Gina Griffin, Catherine Hay, Matt Sampson and former Witness members Dylan Keeton, John Langley and Julian Poole.

== Track listing ==
All songs by Gerard Starkie.

1. "Drinking Alone Down The Evil" – 3:30
2. "Go Along With Me On This One" – 2:25
3. "Play On Empty Singer" – 2:49
4. "Previous Notes" – 3:30
5. "Flying Dreams" – 3:37
6. "Foolsong #1" – 4:19
7. "Potions" – 4:07
8. "All The Licks" – 3:51
9. "Drying Times" – 3:46
10. "The Whispering" – 3:07
