= Rochelle Potkar =

Indian writer

- Born: Kalyan, Maharashtra, India
- Education: La Trobe University
- Occupation: Writer
- Writing career
- Genres: Fiction, poetry, short story
- Notable works: The Arithmetic of Breasts & Other Stories; Four Degrees of Separation; Paper Asylum; Bombay Hangovers
- Website: rochellepotkar.com

Rochelle Potkar is an Indian writer. She was a writer-in-residence at the University of Iowa's International Writing Program in 2015, and a Charles Wallace Writer's fellow at the University of Stirling, Scotland in 2016-17. She is the founder of the Arcs-of-a-Circle artists' residency program.

== Early life and education ==
Rochelle Potkar was born in Kalyan. She moved to Mumbai in 1998. She completed a degree in commerce and a post-graduate degree in advertising from Wigan and Leigh College, Mahalaxmi and completed an MBA from La Trobe University, Australia.

== Career ==
Her short stories and poems have been published in books, journals, and anthologies. After visiting the Tapi estuary at Surat in 2007, she wrote the story "Tropical Estuary." Her first book of short fiction, The Arithmetic of Breasts and Other Stories, was self-published in 2014 and shortlisted for The Digital Book of the Year Award 2014, by Publishing Next, Goa. In 2014, she was one of the founders of Cappuccino Readings (CR), which organized poetry readings in Mumbai. She also participated in Poetry Couture, an association formed to promote poetry readings in India, and was co-editor of Neesah Magazine.

In 2015, she was selected to participate as writer-in-residence in the 2015 Fall residency program of the International Writing Program at the University of Iowa.

Her first book of poetry, Four Degrees of Separation, was published by Paperwall in 2016. In 2016, two of her poems were included in the anthology 40 under 40: an Anthology of Post-Globalization Poetry.

She was the 2016-2017 Charles Wallace Writer's fellow at the University of Stirling, Scotland. In 2017, she founded the Arcs-of-a-Circle Artists' Residency in Mumbai. In 2017 and 2018, she contributed to the Joao Roque Literary Journal as poetry editor.

Rochelle practices and promotes haibun through workshops. In 2018, she published a collection of haibun, Paper Asylum, via Copper Coin Publishing. A blog review of Paper Asylum called Potkar "a wonderful weaver of stories" for her "very reasonably resonant" poetry. In 2018, a poem she wrote during her Iowa residency was adapted into a film for the Visible Poetry Project.

She co-edited the 2018 Goan-Irish anthology, Goa: A Garland of Poems, with Gabriel Rosenstock. Her collection of short stories, Bombay Hangovers, was published by Vishwakarma Publications in 2021. Her short story "Honour" was included in The Punch Magazine’s Anthology of New Writing: Select Short Stories by Women Writers, also published in 2021.

=== As actor ===
Rochelle played a character role in the Tamil feature-length film, Taramani, directed by Ram.

== Selected work ==
=== Poetry ===
- Four Degrees of Separation, Paperwall, March 2016 ISBN 978-9382749363
- Paper Asylum, Copper Coin Publishing, May 2018 ISBN 978-9384109264

=== Short stories ===
- The Arithmetic of Breasts And Other Stories, CreateSpace, 2014, Rochelle Potkar, 2019 ISBN 978-9351749004
- Bombay Hangovers, Vishwakarma Publications ISBN 978-8195012633

=== Anthologies ===
- 40 Under 40: An Anthology of Post-Globalisation, Poetrywalla, 2016 ISBN 978-9382749448
- The Best Asian Short Stories, Kitab International, 2017 ISBN 978-9811149702
- Goa: A Garland of Poems, The Onslaught Press, 2017 ISBN 978-1912111664
- Iowa River: A Selection of Contemporary International Poetry ISBN 978-1-988483-26-9
- 100 Poems Are Not Enough, Walking BookFairs, 2018 ISBN 978-8193646939
- Writing Language, Culture, and Development: Africa Vs Asia: Volume 1, 2018 ISBN 9780797484931
- The Punch Magazine Anthology of New Writing: Select Short Stories by Women Writers, Niyogi Books, 2021 ISBN 978-9391125318

== Honors and awards ==
=== Short fiction ===
- Winner, Open Road Review Short Story Prize, 2016, for "The Leaves of the Deodar"

=== Poetry ===
- Shortlist, the Gregory O' Donoghue International Poetry Prize, 2018, for The girl from Lal Bazaar
- Shortlist, 2017 Hungry Hill Writing Competition, Ireland, for "Cellular: P.O.W."
- Third place at the David Burland Poetry Prize 2017, for "Ground up"
- Winner of the 2018 Norton Girault Literary Prize for "To Daraza"
- First runner up, Great India Poetry Contest, for "War Specials"

== See also ==
- List of female poets
- List of Indian poets
- Indian poetry in English
- Goan literature
