= Rita Lynch =

English singer-songwriter

- Origin: London, England
- Genres: Alternative rock Indie rock
- Years active: 1984 – present
- Labels: Sugar Shack; Independent

Rita Lynch is an English singer-songwriter who achieved a profile in the UK in the early 1990s and was the subject of a Channel 4 documentary, filmed as part of the Out series. Her music has been used in a Channel 4 drama, Rosebud, and in British horror movie Vampire Diary. Her sound has been described as PJ Harvey meets At the Drive-In with a dose of the usual dark ambience that accompanies many Bristol releases.

She retains a devoted following today and continues to record and perform. Her live performances currently feature a three-piece line-up with Mike Youe and John Langley (Blue Aeroplanes, Witness, The Mekons, Strangelove, Saturation Point) on drums. She is also known for her time with cult Bristol band The Blue Aeroplanes.

In 2009, Bristol/Bath entertainment magazine Venue described Lynch as 'the personification of ferocious conviction' and named her performance at the Fleece on 13 August as Bristol's third-best gig of the year.

== Biography ==
Rita Lynch was born in South London in 1961. She attended Catholic school and was taught to play guitar by nuns.

After leaving school she played her first shows as Rita & The Piss Artists, an all-girl punk band. Playing bass guitar – 'seemed the easiest' – the band became an excuse to get drunk a lot.

When that band broke up she joined God Bless You, initially as a bassist. Finding that she had a good singing voice Lynch dropped the bass & concentrated on vocals which she shared with Dave Ryan. When God Bless You faded out, Lynch decided to launch herself as a singer-songwriter. Eventually she got a band together to record her first album, 'Call Me Your Girlfriend'. Released in 1991, this was toured throughout the UK and Europe.

Until 2006 Lynch continued to play solo and with a band before joining the Blue Aeroplanes. She now continues playing with her own band which evolved into the current three-piece line-up featuring John Langley on drums, and Mike Youe on bass. Both of which are current members of The Blue Aeroplanes.

== Discography ==
=== Singles ===
- The High And The Mighty (2014)

=== with God Bless You ===
- Sugar bw Magic & Mystery (1987)

=== Albums ===
- Call Me Your Girlfriend (1991)
- Victim (1992)
- Alive & Unreleased (1997)
- All Dressed Up (2001)
- Junkie (2006)
- The Only Man (2007)
- Good Advice (2008)
- What Am I? (2010)
- Body of Work PROMO (2011)
- Crack On (2011)
- Live At The Fleece (2012?)
- Anti-Social(2014)
- Backwards(2017)
- FairyTales & Lies(2025)

=== Various Artists Compilations ===
- (Over A Century of Vivisection And Anti-Vivisection) How Much Longer? (1992) "Call Me Your Girlfriend"
- Hidden Charms (1994) "Stripped Right Away" & "Call Me Your Girlfriend"
- Girls Together (1996) "Rock & Roll Lifestyle"
- Undead: A Gothic Masterpiece, Vol. 1 (1996) "Call Me Your Girlfriend"
- Undead: A Gothic Masterpiece, Vol. 3 (1996) "Baby I Wonder"
- Flesheaters. Return of the Undead (1996) "Rolla Coasta"
- Flesh Fangs & Filigree (1996) "Baby I Wonder"
- Grrl Power (1997) "Call Me Your Girlfriend"
- Poppies: The Ultimate Peace Album (1997) "Baby I Wonder"
- Femme Fatale – A History of Women in Popular Music (1998) "Call Me Your Girlfriend"
- Plan 9. A Tribute to Ed Wood (1999) "Call Me Your Girlfriend" retitled "Glen or Glenda"
- Undead: A Gothic Masterpiece (1999) "Call Me Your Girlfriend" & "Baby I Wonder"
- Dressed to Kill Records Presents: (1999) "Baby I Wonder"
- Gothic Erotica (1999) "Baby I Wonder"
- Kill Everyone (1999) "Baby I Wonder"
- The Goth Witch Project (1999) "Rolla Coata"
- Stiletto Vamp (2000) "Baby I Wonder"
- Vampyre Nights (2000) "Call Me Your Girlfriend"
- Necromantic (2001) "Call Me Your Girlfriend"
- Femme Fatale[Big Eye] (2001) "Call Me Your Girlfriend"
- Undead – The Greatest Goth Album of All Time (2001) "Call Me Your Girlfriend" & "Baby I Wonder"
- Live Forever" (2001) "Call Me Your Girlfriend & "Baby I Wonder"
- Sugar Shack Records Presents: Greatest Hits Vol. 1 (2006) "Delight"
- Sugar Shack Records: Rock Releases, 2001–2007 (2007) "Beautiful Eyes"
- Vampire Diary (2007) "It Feels Like The End of the World", "Far Away" & "Fallen For You"
- Bridging The Gap. Sort Of... Benefit For The Junction Bristol (2007) "Just A Lifetime"
- SchNEWS DVD Vol 2 (2011) "Losing"
- Rock The Record (2012) "Losing"
- Rita Lynch And Girlfriends (2012) "Call Me Your Girlfriend", "Roller Coasta", "Baby I Wonder" & "Find A Love"

=== with The Blue Aeroplanes ===
- Skyscrapers (2009)
- Good Luck Signs (2010)
- Anti-Gravity (2011)
- Culture Gun(2022)
- Staring At The Future(2024)
