= Wigan and Leigh College =

School in Greater Manchester, England

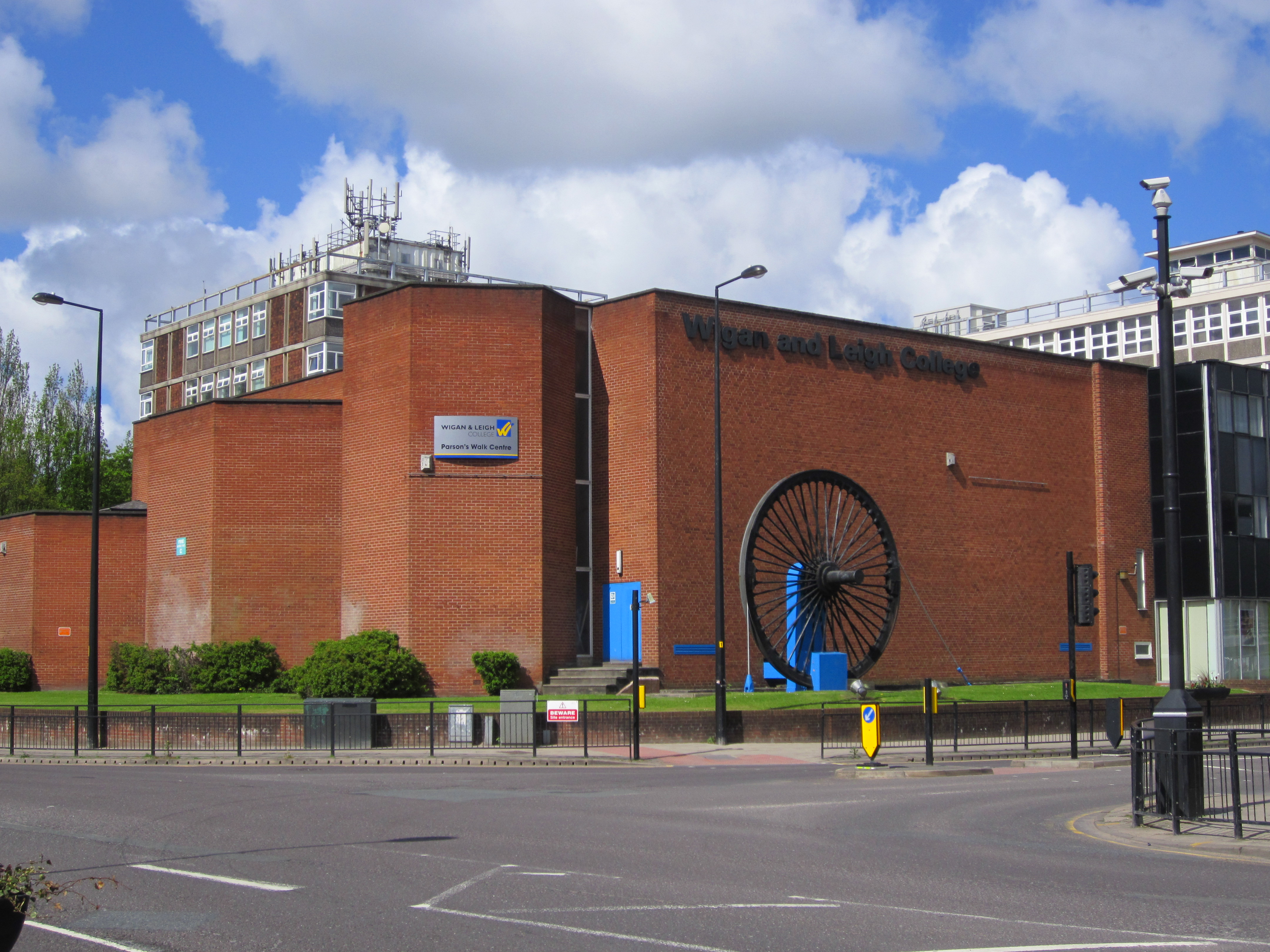
- Wigan and Leigh, Greater Manchester; England

Information
- Established: 1857 – Wigan Mining and Technical College; 1992 – Wigan & Leigh College
- Local authority: Wigan Metropolitan Borough Council
- Head teacher: Anna Dawe
- Enrolment: 8,000
- Colours: Yellow & blue
- Website: www.wigan-leigh.ac.uk

Wigan & Leigh College is a state further and higher education college based at five locations in the towns of Wigan and Leigh in Greater Manchester, England, United Kingdom. Currently, there are 500 staff members employed, and more than 8,000 students enrolled in full-time or part-time courses. The college's programmes of study include: General Certificate of Education (GCSEs), BTEC First Diplomas, A-Levels, T-Levels, National Diplomas, Higher National Diplomas, Apprenticeships, Foundation Degree and Degree courses that provide access routes towards degree-accepting universities in the UK.

The foundations of Wigan & Leigh College date back to 1857, and the current institution was formed in April 1992 through the merger of Wigan College of Technology and Leigh College. Both have a long-standing history of providing academic technical and vocational education. Wigan & Leigh College has four 'Centres of Excellence' in Sport, Creative Arts, Engineering and Health and Social Care.

== History ==
=== Wigan College of Technology ===
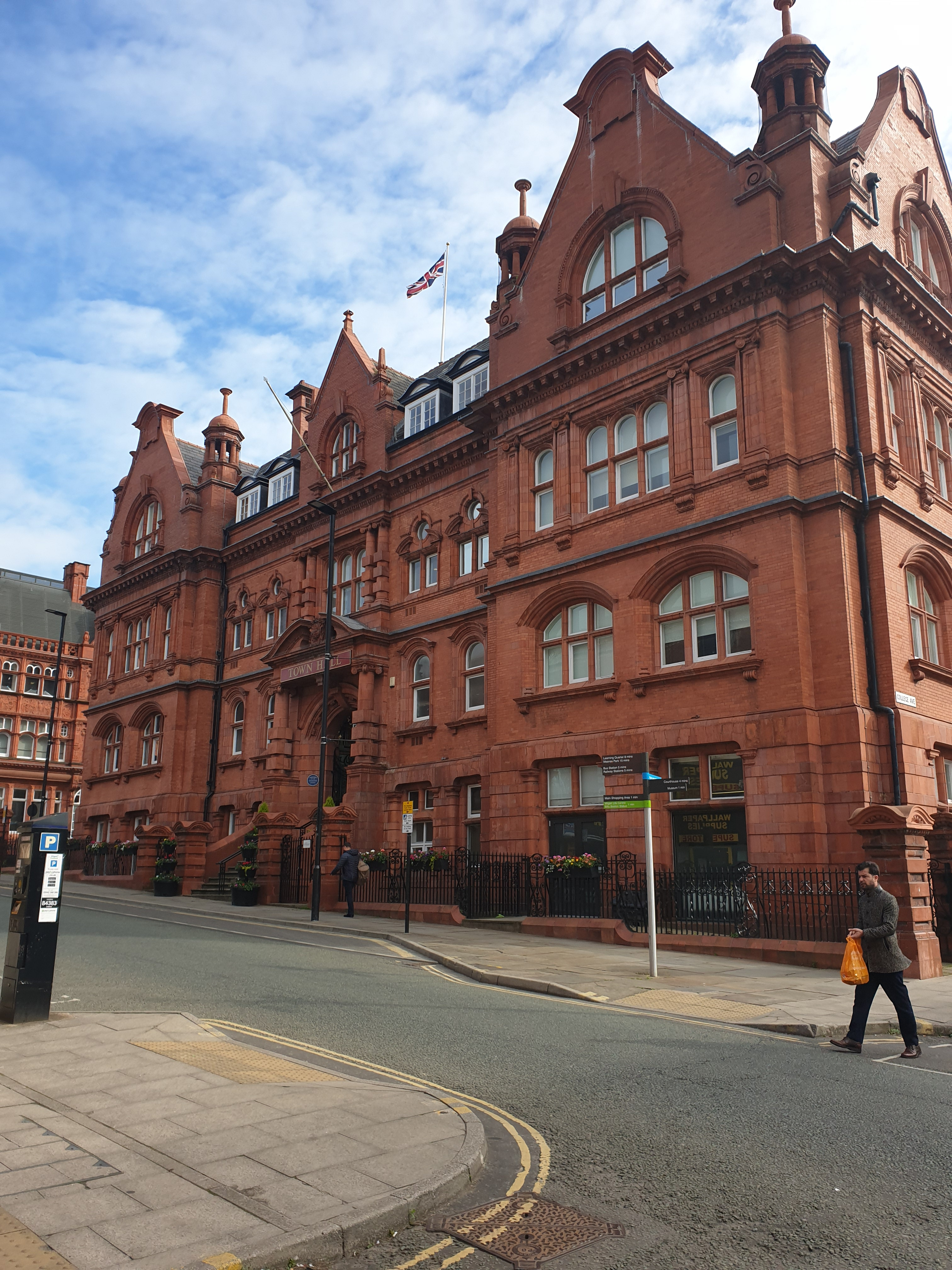
Wigan College building used from 1903 to the late 1980s (now Wigan Town Hall)

In 1857, the suggestion of opening a mining college in Wigan was made by the prominent mine-owner Edward Cardwell, 1st Viscount Cardwell to the trustees of the Wigan Blue Coat National School, and Wigan Mining and Technical College was formed that year. When classes started on 2 August 1858, there were fifty enrolled students in the subjects of mining, geology and chemistry.

By 1875, the college had grown to hold 130 students. However, it was still peripatetic, with no fixed location and was based in other local venues such as the Town Hall, the Conservative Club and Wigan Grammar School, until 1882 when its first college building was erected. By the turn of the century, it was regarded as one of the foremost mining colleges in the country. In 1903, after raising £50,000, the college moved a new ornate campus building, which was used for much of the 20th century (now used as Wigan Town Hall).

In 1946, the college first started offering higher-education programmes, originally accredited by the University of London. By 1956, the college had awarded 500 degree certificates, mainly in mining and engineering. Throughout the years, it offered a growing range of courses and was later renamed Wigan College of Technology in 1972. During the 1970s, it had around 10,000 full-time and part-time students.

=== Leigh College ===
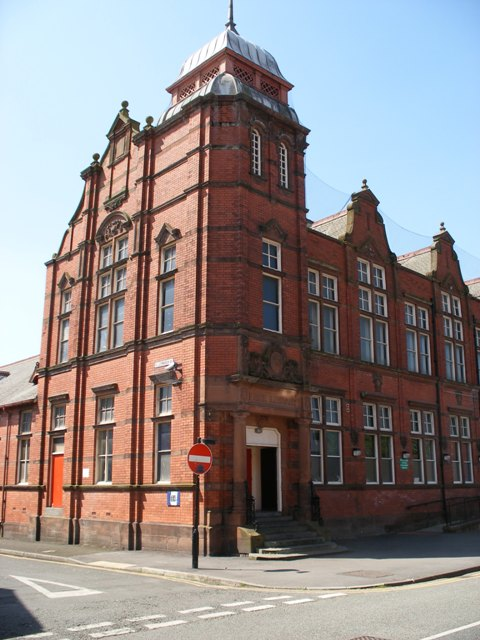
Grade II listed Leigh College building used from 1894 to 2010

Leigh college was founded as Leigh Technical School in 1894, and was opened on 26 September by Frederick Stanley, 16th Earl of Derby. The new red-brick building, built in the English Renaissance style, cost £23,000 and also included a public library and a "chemical theatre and laboratory" on the upper floor. It was granted technical college status in 1926.

=== Wigan & Leigh College ===
Both Wigan and Leigh colleges eventually became tertiary colleges. The current institution was formed after the Further and Higher Education Act 1992 when Wigan and Leigh colleges merged.

In 2017, Wigan & Leigh College was awarded "University Centre" status, allowing students to achieve a higher education accredited by the University of Central Lancashire from the college.

In 2018, Wigan & Leigh College won FE College of the Year (North West Educate Awards).

== Northwest campuses ==
- Leigh
  - Leigh College – 53°29′18″N 2°31′52″W
- Wigan
  - Pagefield Campus – 53.55553°N 2.63936°W
  - Parsons Walk – 53.54884°N 2.63456°W
  - Wigan School for the Arts (WSA) - 53.54959°N 2.63618°W

== Notable alumni ==
- Fran Bentley, footballer (Bristol City)
- Jeff Forshaw
- Ella Toone, footballer (Manchester United, England)

== See also ==
- List of schools in the North West of England
- University Technical College Wigan
- WLC College India
