= Gieve Patel =

Indian writer and artist (1940–2023)

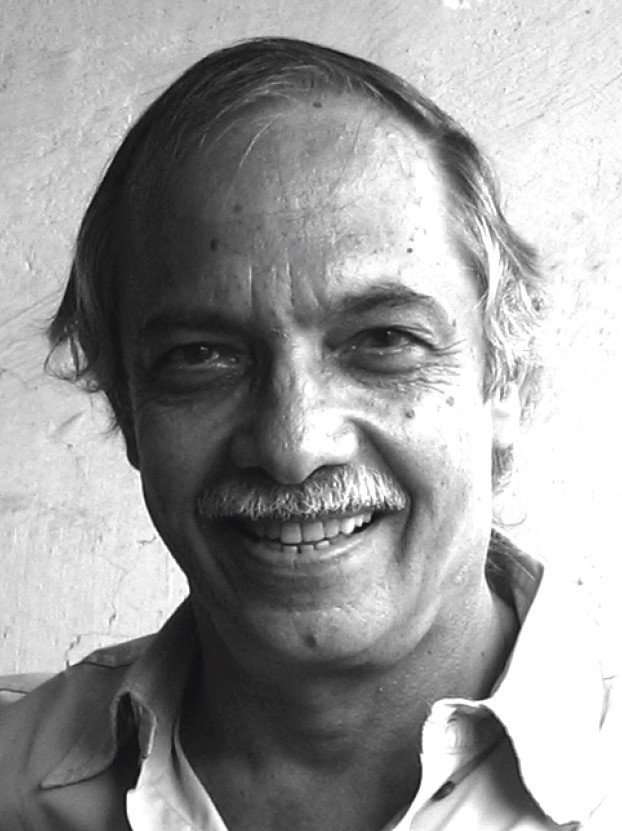
- Born: 18 August 1940; Bombay, Bombay Province, British India
- Died: 3 November 2023 (aged 83); Pune, Maharashtra, India
- Education: Grant Medical College, Mumbai
- Occupation: General practitioner
- Known for: Poetry; painting; playwrighting

Gieve Patel (18 August 1940 – 3 November 2023) was an Indian poet, playwright, painter, as well as a physician. He belonged to a group of writers who had subscribed themselves to the Green Movement which was involved in an effort to protect the environment. His poems speak of deep concerns for nature and expose man's cruelty to it. His notable poems include, How Do You Withstand (1966), Body (1976), Mirrored Mirroring (1991) and On killing a tree. He also wrote three plays, titled Princes (1971), Savaksa (1982) and Mr. Behram (1987).

Patel retired from his medical practice in 2005. He resided in Mumbai and was fully engaged in the art field. Patel was considered to be one of the important painters who portrayed the social reality parallel to the prominent painters of the Baroda School. Through his paintings, Patel explored contemporary life, with a focus on its complexity and beauty. He died from cancer in Pune, on 3 November 2023, at the age of 83.

== Early life and education ==
Patel was born on 18 August 1940 in Bombay (now Mumbai). His father was a dentist and his mother was the daughter of a doctor. He was educated at St. Xavier's High Schooling and Grant Medical College, Mumbai. After becoming a doctor, he had initially worked in a government job in his native village of Nargol in southern Gujarat. He then continued his work as a general practitioner in Mumbai until his retirement in 2005.

== Career ==
=== Poetry ===
Patel's poetical works include Poems, launched by Nissim Ezekiel, followed by How Do You Withstand, Body and Mirrored Mirroring. One common theme throughout his work is the relationship between his landowning family and the tribal Warlis that worked in their estate.

Patel conducted poetry workshops in Rishi Valley School for more than a decade, and edited a collection of poetry published in 2006. His poetry is included in Anthology of Contemporary Indian Poetry (BigBridge, United States). One of his Poems Licence from the collection How do you Withstand is included in the anthology Confronting Love edited by Arundhati Subramanyam and Jerry Pinto. He was also featured in the poetry anthology The Golden Treasure of Writers Workshop Poetry on a killing tree (2008) ed. by Rubana Huq and published by Writers Workshop, Calcutta. Additionally, he translated poems of the 17th century Gujarati poet Akho into English.

==== Published works ====
- University.
- Poems. Nissim Ezekiel, 1966.
- How Do You Withstand, Body. Clearing House, (1976 ).
- Mirrored, Mirroring. Oxford University Press, 1991.
- On Killing a Tree.

=== Art ===
==== Paintings ====
Patel’s paintings received public attention when he painted the Politician series in the late 1960s and early 1970s. After the Politician series, Patel's well-known artworks are his Railway Platform series. These paintings originated from his experiences of sitting on a bench in a suburban railway station and watching the trains arrive and depart. One interesting aspect about these paintings is that Patel does not paint a single person on the platform i.e., the platforms are completely devoid of people. This is the moment when one train arrives, the crowd leaves and the passengers of another train are yet to arrive. Even though the platforms are always crowded, one feels the painter's longing to find solitude in the chaos of the city through the serene images in his paintings.

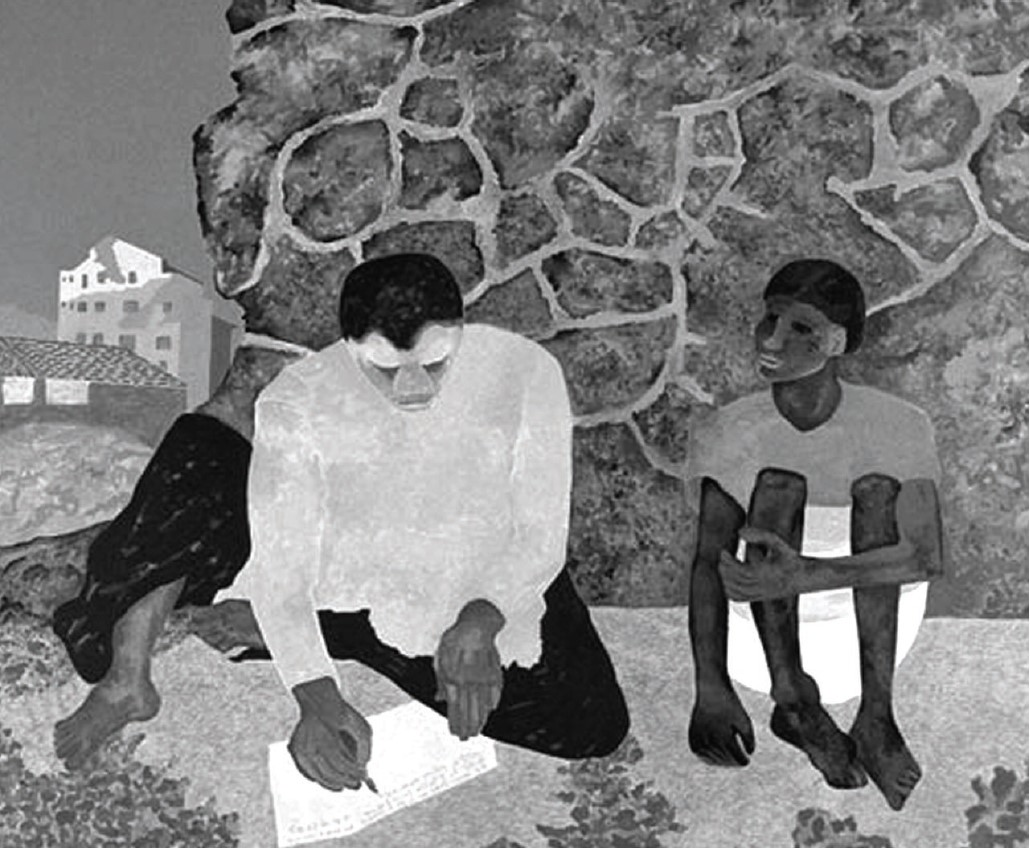
The Letter Home (2002) by Gieve Patel

A similar atmosphere of mystery and peace can be seen in other city-based images painted by Patel in the later period. Two men near a handcart, Vegetable seller, Bus stop, The Letter Home are some of his notable works. In these paintings one can see how the painter works on two different aspects at the same time. On one hand, the idea is to create engaging experiences through pictures, colours and shapes. Whereas, on the other hand, there are struggles of people in their daily lives and its relationship with the artist. Given his closeness to life and the increasing violence in society, Patel's paintings in the 1980s and 1990s often featured wounded people and images of the dead. They take a critical look at some of the terrible aspects of human nature and society as a whole with a fearless and neutral perspective.

For his last twenty years or so, the subject that kept Patel preoccupied was the view of looking into a well. The wells in Patel's native village Nargol and its vicinity are not that deep. Most of the time, one can bend down and touch the water in the well. One can see the sky and clouds reflected in the water along with the surrounding mountains, trees and bushes. Patel painted a series based on these views of the well, titled Looking into a Well. While these are considered to be paintings of nature, the act of looking at nature appeared to Patel like peering into his own mind. Thereby, he continued to paint in this quest of self-exploration.

Patel held his first art show at Mumbai's Jehangir Art Gallery in 1966, and went on to have several major exhibitions in India and abroad. He participated in the Menton Biennale, France in 1976; India, Myth and Reality, Oxford in 1982; Contemporary Indian Art, Royal Academy, London 1982. He also exhibited for Contemporary Indian Art, Grey Art Gallery, New York City, 1985; Indian Art from the Herwitz collection Worcester Art Museum, Massachusetts, 1985 and Coups de Coeur Geneva, 1987.

==== Sculptures ====
Patel held the first exhibition of his sculptures in 2010. His sculptures are broadly based on two themes. The story of Ekalavya in the Mahabharata is one of the subjects, where the narrative is centred on Eklavya's hand and broken thumb. Another theme is that of Daphne in Greek mythology, where the beautiful Daphne transforms into a tree to escape the lust of the god Apollo. In these sculptures, Patel depicts the semi-transformed state of Daphne's body.

== See also ==
- Indian English Literature
- Indian Writing in English
- List of poets from Mumbai
