= Arvind Krishna Mehrotra =

Indian writer (born 1947)

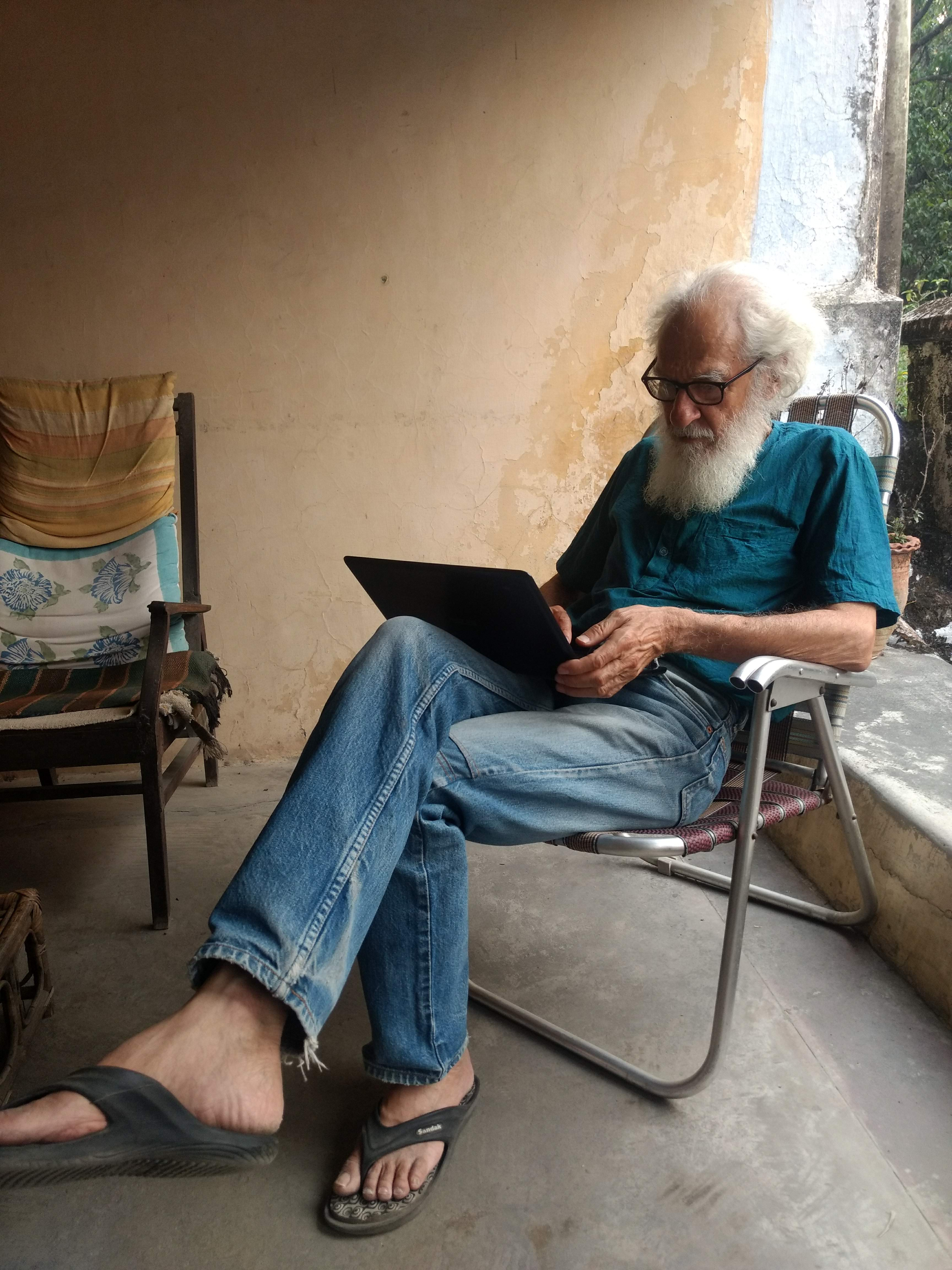
- Mehrotra at his Dehradun home, May 2018
- Born: 1947
- Occupations: Translator, writer, critic

Arvind Krishna Mehrotra (born 1947) is an Indian poet, anthologist, literary critic and translator.

== Biography ==
Arvind Krishna Mehrotra was born in Lahore in 1947. He has published six collections of poetry in English and two of translation — a volume of Prakrit love poems, The Absent Traveller, recently reissued in Penguin Classics, and Songs of Kabir (NYRB Classics). His Oxford India Anthology of Twelve Modern Indian Poets (1992) has been very influential. He has edited several books, including History of Indian Literature in English (Columbia University Press, 2003), Collected Poems in English by Arun Kolatkar (Bloodaxe Books, 2010) and The Book of Indian Essays: Two Hundred Years of English Prose (Black Kite, 2020). His collection of essays Partial Recall: Essays on Literature and Literary History was published by Permanent Black in 2012. A second book of essays, Translating the Indian Past and Other Literary Histories (Permanent Black), appeared in 2019.

Mehrotra was nominated for the post of Professor of Poetry at the University of Oxford in 2009. He came second behind Ruth Padel, who later resigned over allegations of a smear campaign against Trinidadian poet Derek Walcott (who had himself earlier withdrawn from the election process).

Mehrotra has translated more than 200 literary works from ancient Prakrit language, and from Hindi, Bengali and Gujarati.

For his place within the community of 'Bombay Poets' and the role he played in the little magazine 'scene' in the 60s, see 'The Worlds of Bombay Poetry' special issue and his long interview with L. Zecchini, 'We were like Cartographers Mapping the City: An Interview with Arvind Krishna Mehrotra'.

== Bibliography ==
=== Poetry collections ===
- Mehrotra, A. K. (1984). Middle earth. Three Crowns Books. Delhi: Oxford University Press.
- Mehrotra, A. K. (1976). Nine enclosures. Bombay: Clearing House.
- Mehrotra, A. K. (1982). Distance in statute miles. Bombay: Clearing House.
- Mehrotra, A K. (1998). The transfiguring places: poems. Delhi: Ravi Dayal Publisher.
- Mehrotra, A. K. (2014). Collected Poems 1969-2014. Delhi: Penguin India.
- Mehrotra, A. K. (2016). Collected Poems. Artarmon NSW: Giramondo.
- Mehrotra, A.K. (2020) Selected Poems and Translations/NYRB Poets. New York: New York Review Books.

=== Edited books ===
- Mehrotra, A. K. (2003). History of Indian literature in English. New York: Columbia University Press.
- Mehrotra, A. K. (1992). The Oxford India anthology of twelve modern Indian poets. Delhi: Oxford University Press. excerpts
  - Translated into German as Mehrotra, A. K. (2006). Indische Dichter der Gegenwart eine Anthologie englischsprachiger Lyrik Indiens. Heidelberg: Verl. Das Wunderhorn.
- Weissbort, D., & Mehrotra, A. K. (1993). Periplus: poetry in translation. Delhi: Oxford University Press.
- Mehrotra, A. K. (2007). The last bungalow: writings on Allahabad. New Delhi: Penguin Books.

=== Translation ===
- Mehrotra, A. K. (1991). The Absent Traveller: Prākrit love poetry from the Gāthāsaptaśatī of Sātavāhana Hāla. Delhi: Ravi Dayal Publisher.
- Mehrotra, A. K. (2011). Songs of Kabir. New York: NYRB Classics.
- Mehrotra, A.K. with Sara Rai (2019). Blue Is Like Blue: Stories by Vinod Kumar Shukla. Delhi: HarperCollins.

=== Editor of literary magazines ===
- damn you/a magazine of the arts. Allahabad, India: 1964-1968.
- Ezra. Bombay, India: Ezra-Fakir Press, 1966-1969.
- Fakir. Bombay, India: Ezra-Fakir Press, 1966.

== See also ==
- Indian English Poetry
- Indian poetry in English
- Indian English Literature
- Indian literature
- List of Indian poets
