= WLC College India =

WLCI College India
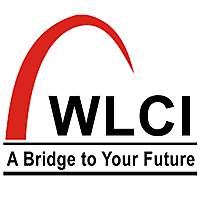

Location
- 160 B, Lane W1, Block E, Western Avenue, Sainik Farms; Khanpur, New Delhi, 110062; India

Information
- Established: 1996
- Founder: Mr. Vinay Pasricha
- Website: https://www.wlci.in

WLC College India (WLCI) is an Indian professional education institution. The college, established in 1996 by Vinay Pasricha, in collaboration with Wigan & Leigh College UK, has nine major campuses across India and Nepal.

The college has an Employer's Council consisting of 356 senior managers from the industry. This council ensures that the programs of the college are in line with the requirements of the industry. WLCI was formerly known as Wigan & Leigh College India. Its Creative School established collaborative programs with several international universities and awarding bodies in the year 1997.

== Campuses ==
WLCI has campuses in New Delhi, Mumbai, Bangalore, Chennai, Kolkata, Pune and Surat as well as in Kathmandu, Nepal.

== Academic Process ==
WLCI organizes an All India Combined Entrance Test for admission into postgraduate and undergraduate programs of Advertising & Graphic Design, Fashion Technology, Business Management and Media & Mass Communication. The selection process at WLCI has been designed to assess each candidate's personality, abilities, analytical skills, and creative aptitude. WLCI also offers more than 100 scholarships to Indian students to help them pursue undergraduate and postgraduate courses through a scholarship test.

- All India Combined Entrance Test

The All India Combined Entrance Test, also known as AICET, is a common entrance test that has been specially designed for students from any stream. Whether a student is applying for Creative Courses or Business Programs, AICET is the first step in the selection process. This test is divided into two parts:

- General Ability Test (GAT)

The General Ability Test measures general intelligence of the candidates. The test aims at evaluating the candidate through quantitative, analytical and logical ability. It assesses the general knowledge and communication skills of the candidate. It also focuses on testing the students' capacity for learning in general, regardless of any specific skill in a certain subject or topic.

- Creative Ability Test (CAT)

The CAT is designed to assess the Drawing skills, Observation & Visualization ability of the candidate. It judges the intuitive ability as well as creative and innovative use of colour and illustration skills. For students applying for Media & Mass communication, it assesses their verbal communication ability and creative writing skills.

For business students there is a Personality Assessment Test that identifies the personality traits and interest areas of the applicant and helps determine the profession best suited for the candidate and where he/ she is most likely to succeed in the professional career. Communication Ability Test that evaluates the proficiency in English communication skills – reading, writing and speaking. The communication skill is important to determine the employability in the industry.

- Personal Interview

The tests are followed by a personal Interview wherein candidates are evaluated for their skills and abilities required in their chosen field. They are also judged in communication and interpersonal skills as well as creative and lateral thinking.

== Division ==
Divisions:

WLCI School of Fashion

The school was established in 1997.

WLCI School of Advertising & Graphic Design

The School started in the year 1998.

WLCI School of Digital Media & Communications

WLCI's School of Digital Media & Communication provides specialization courses in Digital Media including journalism, business journalism, Advertising and Public Relations, Social Media and Digital Photography and Publishing. The School of Digital Media & Communication offers job-specific programs for undergraduates, graduates as well as working professionals.

The WLCI School of Business

WLCI School of Business was established in 1996.

== Controversies ==
In 2011, WLCI had accused IIM-Kolkata of intellectual property theft. WLCI had alleged that IIM-Kolkata copied structure and syllabus of a special course. However, WLCI had not registered a copyright for the educational course. IIM-Kolkata had labelled the allegation as frivolous.
