= List of bands originating in Leeds =

The following is a list of bands originating from Leeds, West Yorkshire, England

- Abrasive Wheels
- Age of Chance
- Alt-J
- And None of Them Knew They Were Robots
- Bearfoot Beware
- Black Star Liner
- Black Moth
- Black Wire
- Boyracer
- Brawlers (band)
- The Bridewell Taxis
- Buen Chico
- Castrovalva (band)
- The Chevin
- Classically Handsome Brutes
- Cryptic Shift
- Cud
- Dead Disco
- The Declining Winter
- Delta 5
- Dinosaur Pile-Up
- Distortion Mirrors
- Duels
- The Dunwells
- Eagulls
- English Teacher
- Eureka Machines
- The Expelled
- Fig.4.0
- The Flex
- The Flying Hendersons
- ¡Forward, Russia!
- Gang of Four
- Gentleman's Dub Club
- Girls at Our Best!
- Grammatics
- Hadouken!
- Higher Power
- The Hollow Men
- Hood
- Hope & Social
- I Concur
- Icon A.D.
- I Like Trains
- Jan Dukes de Grey
- Kaiser Chiefs
- The Manhattan Love Suicides
- The March Violets
- The Mekons
- The Mission
- The Music
- The New Mastersounds
- Nightmares on Wax
- The Outer Limits (pre-Christie)
- Pale Saints
- The Parachute Men
- The Pigeon Detectives
- Pulled Apart by Horses
- Red Lorry Yellow Lorry
- The Rhythm Sisters
- The Rose of Avalanche
- Scritti Politti
- Send More Paramedics
- The Sisters of Mercy
- Sky Larkin
- Soft Cell
- Stateless
- Static Dress
- Submotion Orchestra
- The Sunshine Underground
- This Et Al
- The Three Johns
- Utah Saints
- Vessels
- Vib Gyor
- Vipertime
- The Wedding Present
- Wild Beasts
- Yard Act
- Your Vegas

== See also ==
- Music in Leeds
- Bands and musicians from Yorkshire and North East England
