= No Cause for Concern =

Studio album by Vice Squad
- Released: 1981
- Studios: Facility Studios, Bristol
- Genre: Punk rock
- Label: Zonophone
- Producers: Roger Wall (as Roger the Naked Sound Engineer), Vice Squad

Vice Squad chronology
No Cause for Concern (1981)	Stand Strong Stand Proud (1982)

No Cause for Concern is the debut studio album by Vice Squad. It was originally released in 1981 by Zonophone, a division of EMI. Although it wasn't released by Riot City Records the band decided to use the Riot City name as it was a label they founded. It was later re-released by Dojo with two bonus tracks and Captain Oi! with the same two bonus tracks and six more tracks.

== Track listing ==
1. "Young Blood" (Shane Baldwin, Dave Bateman) – 2:42
2. "Coward" (Bateman, Rebecca Bond) – 2:14
3. "Nothing" (Bateman, Bond) – 1:34
4. "Summer Fashion" (Bateman) – 3:04
5. "1981" (Bateman, Bond) – 2:24
6. "Saturday Night Special" (Baldwin, Bateman) – 2:48
7. "Offering" (Bateman, Bond) – 1:38
8. "The Times They Are a-Changin'" (Bob Dylan) – 1:59
9. "Evil" (Bateman, Bond) – 3:16
10. "Angry Youth" (Bateman) – 1:25
11. "It's a Sell Out" (Bateman) – 1:54
12. "Still Dying" (Bateman) – 1:49
13. "Last Rockers" (Bateman, Bond) – 4:28

=== 1993 Dojo/2000 Captain Oi! bonus tracks ===
14. "(So) What for the 80's" (Bateman, Bond) – 2:09
15. "Sterile" (Bateman, Bondage) – 2:39

=== 2000 Captain Oi! additional bonus tracks ===
16. "Last Rockers" (single version) (Bateman, Bondage) – 4:18
17. "Living on Dreams" (Bateman) – 2:49
18. "Latex Love" (Bateman) – 1:33
19. "Resurrection" (Bateman) – 4:02
20. "Young Blood" (Baldwin, Bateman) – 2:37
21. "Humane" (single version) (Bateman) – 2:01

=== Bonus track origins ===
- Tracks 14 and 15 originally appeared on "Out of Reach" single
- Tracks 16–18 originally appeared on "Last Rockers" single
- Tracks 19–21 originally appeared on "Resurrection" single

== Personnel ==
Vice Squad

- Beki Bondage – vocals
- Dave Bateman – guitar
- Mark Hambly – bass
- Shane Baldwin – drums

== Release history ==
Region	Date	Label	Format	Catalog	Notes
UK	1981	Zonophone	LP	ZEM 103	
UK	1993	Dojo	LP/CD	DOJO 167	Features two bonus tracks
UK	2000	Captain Oi!	CD	AHOY CD 153	Features eight bonus tracks
