= Stand Strong Stand Proud =

Studio album by Vice Squad
- Released: 1982
- Studio: Cave Studio, Bristol
- Genre: Punk rock
- Label: Zonophone
- Producer: Mark Byrne

Vice Squad chronology
No Cause for Concern (1981)	Stand Strong Stand Proud (1982)	Shot Away (1984)

Stand Strong Stand Proud is the second studio album by Vice Squad. It is the final album to feature the band's original lineup. It was originally released in 1982 by Zonophone, a division of EMI. Although it wasn't released by Riot City Records the band decided to use the Riot City name as it was a label they founded. It was later re-released by Dojo and Captain Oi! both with the same five bonus tracks.

Stand Strong Stand Proud contributed to the band's presence in the punk scene, reaching #47 on the UK Albums Chart. While its sales did not match some other releases, it maintained a strong position for a punk album at the time.

== Track listing ==
All songs written by Dave Bateman and Rebecca Bond unless otherwise noted.

1. "Stand Strong, Stand Proud" – 3:18
2. "Humane" – 2:18
3. "Cheap" – 1:41
4. "Gutterchild" – 2:32
5. "Rock N Roll Massacre" (Bond) – 2:59
6. "Fistful of Dollars" (Baldwin, Bateman) – 2:04
7. "Freedom Begins at Home" – 2:44
8. "Out of Reach" – 1:53
9. "Saviour Machine" (David Bowie) – 3:37
10. "No Right to Reply" (Bateman) – 2:54
11. "Deathwish" – 3:54
12. "Propaganda" – 4:49

=== 1993 Dojo/2000 Captain Oi! bonus tracks ===
1. "Tomorrow's Soldier" (Bateman) – 1:56
2. "Darkest Hour" – 1:54
3. "Citizen" – 2:59
4. "Scarred For Life" – 2:27
5. "Faceless Men" – 2:29

=== Bonus track origins ===
- Tracks 13 and 14 originally appeared on Stand Strong EP
- Tracks 15–17 originally appeared on State of the Nation EP

=== Production ===
Stand Strong Stand Proud was produced by Mark Byrne. This was the final album featuring Vice Squad's original lineup.

== Personnel ==
Vice Squad

- Beki Bondage – vocals
- Dave Bateman – guitar
- Mark Hambly – bass
- Shane Baldwin – drums

== Release history ==
Region	Date	Label	Format	Catalog	Notes
UK	1982	Zonophone	LP	ZEM 104	
UK	1993	Dojo	LP/CD	DOJO 170	Features five bonus tracks
UK	2000	Captain Oi!	CD	AHOY CD 156	Features five bonus tracks
