= Chaotic Dischord =

English punk rock band

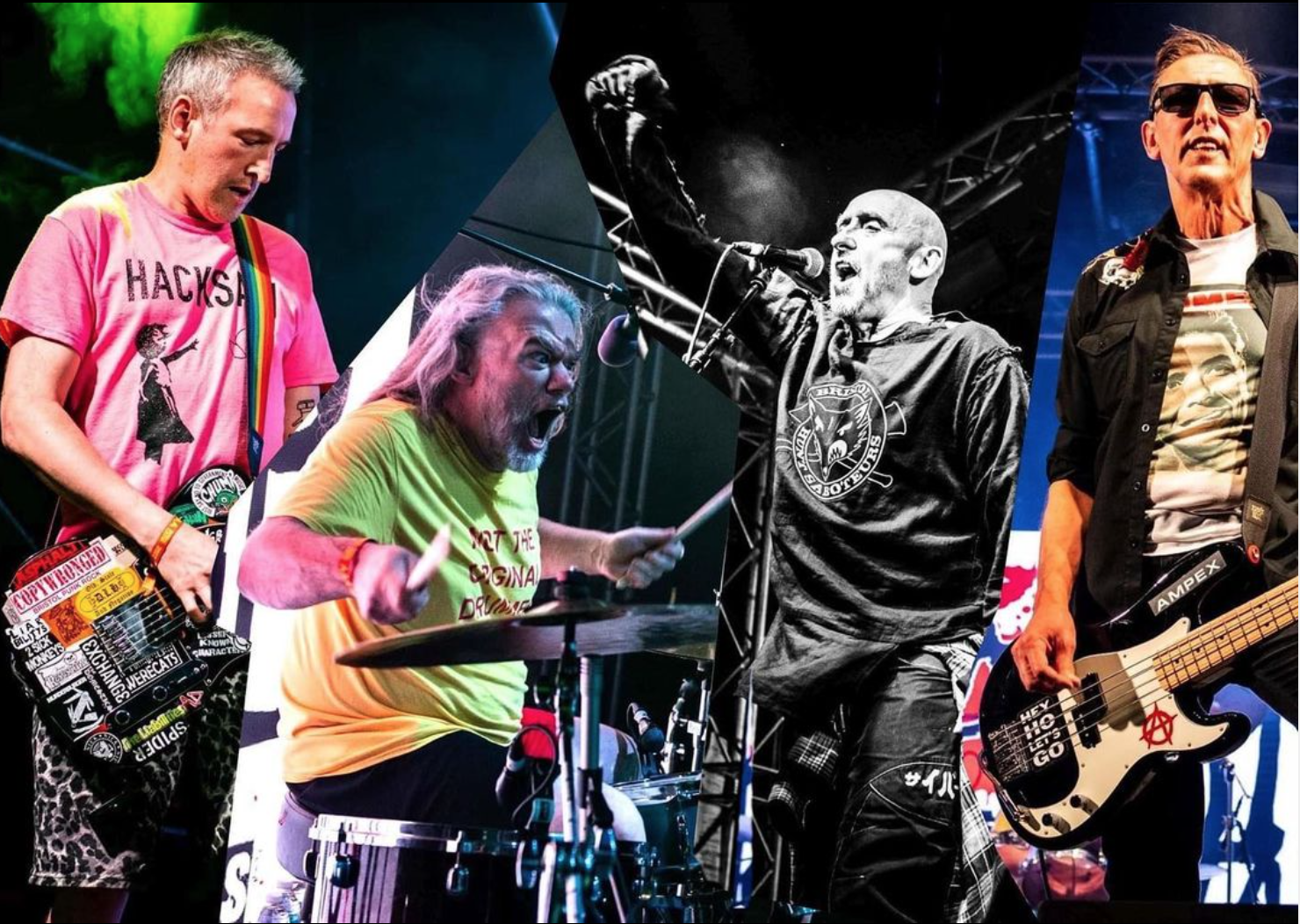
- Chaotic Dischord at the 2022 Rebellion Festival in Blackpool

Background information
- Also known as: Chaotik Dischord, Chaotic Discord
- Origin: Bristol, England
- Genres: Punk rock
- Years active: 1981–1988 then 2019-eventually
- Labels: Riot City, Not Very Nice, Syndicate, Anagram, Punkcore, Irresponsible Punk Songs
- Members: Ransid; Ampex Oxobox; Mucus; Pierce
- Past members: Crusty Rusty; Pox; Evo Stix; Billy Bollox; Pig Rancid
- Website: www.instagram.com/chaoticdischord

Chaotic Dischord are an English punk rock band from Bristol, England, allegedly formed by members of Vice Squad and their road crew in 1981, although this still remains unconfirmed by members of the band. The band also recorded a one-off EP under the name Sex Aids.

== History ==
Chaotic Dischord's line-up consisted of Ampex Oxobox (bass), Evo Stix (drums), Ransid (vocals), and Pox (guitars). There are many myths and legends about how they formed and who was actually a member of the band, but the most enduring story suggests that the band originally formed to parody the hopeless second-wave punk bands that had been signed to Riot City Records – but ironically they went on to become one of the label's best-selling acts. After an argument with Riot City boss Simon Edwards, in which Dave Bateman and Shane Baldwin from Vice Squad claimed they could knock out something on the same lines as some of these bands "in ten minutes", the band later went away and recorded 'Glue Accident'. They submitted the track under the name Chaotik Discord, via a friend to Edwards who was looking for bands for his forthcoming Riotous Assembly compilation LP. To avoid Edwards learning their true identity they claimed that Vice Squad were friends of theirs and that they would only deal with them. Edwards included the track on the album, misspelling their name as Chaotic Dischord, which would stick as the spelling from then on. After some time Edwards discovered the true identity of the band, but by then they were selling records in sufficient numbers to carry on.

Chaotic Dischord's brand of punk was aimed at shocking and insulting whoever they could, with one reviewer claiming that the band's aim was to use the word 'fuck' more often than any other band before or after. The band had several hits on the UK Indie Chart, and were received positively by many critics. United States hardcore punk fanzine Maximum Rock 'n' Roll, unaware of the band's backstory, gave the band several positive reviews despite a dislike for Vice Squad. Attila The Stockbroker, writing for Sounds under the pseudonym John Opposition gave their Fuck Religion... album 5 stars.

The band recorded a one-off EP, Back On The Piss Again, under the name Sex Aids, with Ampex on vocals.

When Beki Bondage left Vice Squad and moved to London, Ampex also departed, and despite his desire to stay with Chaotic Dischord, was sacked from the band. Bondage and Oxobox retaliated by releasing an album along with Mik Heslin (guitar) and Steve Roberts (drums) credited to the slightly differently spelled Chaotic Discord titled Fuck Off You Cunt!… What a Load of Bollocks!!!. The album was recorded over three nights with the musicians improvising the backing tracks on the first night, while Beki added vocals the second night without having heard the music previously. The mixing was done by engineer Paul Gadd with the rest of CD finished on the third night. The album was released on Syndicate records and sold well, although the band made nothing from it.

The band released the Live In New York album in 1984 despite never actually having played a gig. The crowd noise on the album is from The Beatles show at Shea Stadium. When the Riot City label closed down, the band moved to Not Very Nice, continuing to release records, including three more albums. They eventually split up in 1988 when Ransid's tool hire business took off.

== Reunion ==
After continued offers from punk festivals around the globe, Chaotic Dischord reformed to play Rebellion Festival 2020. When that obviously couldn't happen they were confirmed to play in 2021, to the same result. Fortunately Rebellion still wanted them and they played both the 2022 and the 2023 festivals.

The band played its first ever gig at Exchange in Bristol in February 2022, and have since gone on to play shows all over the planet, taking in shows in Vancouver, Madrid, Berlin, Australia and Ramsgate. They also occasionally play secret gigs under their aforementioned nom de plume Sex Aids.

They continue to tour, and in August 2023, launched their first physical release in 35 years when they brought out their Songs To Fuck Your Mental Health To limited edition maxi-single on pukey coloured 10-inch vinyl in on their own Irresponsible Punk Songs label. This collected songs from their two previously download only releases.

== Discography ==
Chart placings shown are from the UK Indie Chart.

=== Singles/EPs ===
- Fuck The World 7-inch EP (1982) Riot City (#14)
- Never Trust a Friend 7-inch (1983) Riot City (#30)
- Back On The Piss Again 7-inch (1983) Riot City (#24) (as Sex Aids)
- Don't Throw It All Away 12-inch (1984) Riot City (#14)
- Songs To Fuck Your Mum To (2022) Download Only
- Our Mental Health Is Fucking Mental (2023) Download Only

=== Albums ===
- Fuck Religion, Fuck Politics, Fuck The Lot of You! (1983) Riot City
- Don't Throw It All Away (1984) Riot City
- Live In New York (1984) Riot City
- Fuck Off You Cunt!… What A Load Of Bollocks!!! (1984) Syndicate (as Chaotic Discord)
- Now! That's What I Call A Fucking Racket Vol. 1 (1985) Not Very Nice
- Goat Fuckin' Virgin Killerz From Hell (1986) Not Very Nice
- Very Fuckin' Bad (1988) Not Very Nice
- Songs To Fuck Your Mental Health To (2023) Irresponsible Punk Songs

Compilations, Re-issues, Bootlegs…

- Riotous Assembly LP (1982) Riot City (as Chaotik Dischord - track entitled (Glue) Accident)
- You've Got To Be Obscene To Be Heard LP (1988) Link (re-titled reissue of Fuck Off You Cunt!)
- Their Greatest Fuckin' Hits CD (1994) Anagram
- You've Got To Be Obscene To Be Heard CD (1995) Step-1 (cd re-issue of Fuck Off You Cunt!)
- Fuck Religion.../Don't Throw It All Away LP/CD (1996) Visionary Vinyl/Anagram
- Very Fuckin' Bad/Goat Fuckin' Virgin Killerz From Hell! CD (1996) Anagram
- Now! That's What I Call A Fuckin' Racket CD (2001) Punkcore (includes Live In New York)
