= Shot Away =

Studio album by Vice Squad
- Released: 1984
- Genre: Punk rock
- Label: Anagram
- Producer: Mark Byrne

Vice Squad chronology
Stand Strong Stand Proud (1982)	Shot Away (1984)	Get a Life (1999)

Professional ratings
Review scores
Source	Rating
AllMusic	3/5 stars

Shot Away is an album by English punk band, Vice Squad. It was released in 1984 by Anagram Records and was re-released by Anagram on CD with bonus tracks in 1994. It was the only album recorded by Vice Squad without singer Beki Bondage and is the last album to feature founding members Dave Bateman (guitar), Mark Hambly (bass) and Shane Baldwin (drums).

== Track listing ==
1. "New Blood" (Dave Bateman, Mark Byrne) – 3:43
2. "Take It or Leave It" (Bateman) – 4:07
3. "Out in the Cold" (Byrne) – 3:10
4. "Nowhere to Hide" (Bateman) – 4:10
5. "You'll Never Know" (Bateman) – 3:32
6. "Rebels and Kings" (Byrne) – 2:52
7. "Playground" (Byrne) – 1:52
8. "The Rest of Your Life" (Bateman) – 3:33
9. "What's Going On?" (Bateman) – 3:44
10. "Killing Time" (Bateman, Byrne) – 3:13
11. "Teenage Rampage" (Michael Chapman, Nicky Chinn) – 3:37

=== 1994 CD bonus tracks ===
12. "Black Sheep" (Bateman, Byrne) – 2:39
13. "The Times They Are a-Changin'" (Bob Dylan) – 2:13
14. "High Spirits" (Bateman) – 2:23
15. "New Blood (Version)" (Bateman, Byrne) – 5:40
16. "The Pledge" (Bateman, Byrne) – 3:44
17. "Nothing" (Bateman, Byrne) – 1:56

=== Bonus track origins ===
- Tracks 12, 15 and 16 originally appeared on "Black Sheep" single
- Tracks 13 originally appeared on "You'll Never Know" single
- Tracks 14 originally appeared on "Teenage Rampage" single

== Personnel ==
Vice Squad

- Lia – vocals
- Dave Bateman – guitar
- Mark Byrne – guitar
- Mark Hambly – bass
- Shane Baldwin – drums

== Release history ==
Region	Date	Label	Format	Catalog	Notes
UK	1984	Anagram	LP	GRAM 14	
UK	1994	Anagram	CD	CD PUNK 28	Features five bonus tracks
