= Shaun Williams (DJ) =

British DJ

Shaun Williams is a DJ and jazz dancer from Birmingham, United Kingdom, notable for his pioneering role in the UK's jazz fusion and electro music scenes. He achieved success with the early electro club track, released with DSM, "Warrior Groove".

William's was described by musician and author, Mark "Snowboy" Cotgrove, as an "A rated dancer and a peoples-champion as one of the early pioneers of the Jazz dance movement".

== History ==
The rise in popularity of jazz-funk and jazz fusion in the UK during the late 1970s led to a profusion of "all-dayers" being held across the country. These events drew youngsters who travelled in the thousands to listen to their favourite DJs at venues like Birmingham's Hummingbird and Locarno (which later became the Powerhouse) and Rock City in Nottingham.

Shaun Williams first became involved in the UK's jazz dance scene as part of an innovative group of Birmingham-based jazz dancers. However he soon progressed from the dance floor to DJ turntables, where he gained a reputation as an influential and experimental DJ who refused to be restricted in the music he played. Williams was a staple of the Midlands' circuit from 1979 to 1985, representing Birmingham alongside other top DJs from around the country.

At a time when most Birmingham night clubs operated selective door policies and admitted few black people, the Monday nights were a haven for youngsters from all backgrounds, an environment where they could express themselves freely through dance and fashion. It subsequently became known as one of the country's most competitive and cutting-edge jazz fusion nights, with the weekly session attracting dancers from across the UK, who came to listen to Williams and to "battle" against the best of the Midlands' dancers.

Following his all-dayer popularity Williams, along with Birmingham DJ Dave Till, started his long-running jazz fusion night at Birmingham's Rum Runner nightclub. Although Till left the club a couple of years later, Williams continued his residency until its closure in 1983. The Rum Runner saw the formation of the band Duran Duran (who would often be rehearsing upstairs during these jazz nights) and was popular with New Romantics, but on Monday nights Williams played jazz fusion, funk and soul to a predominantly black audience.

As the popularity of electro gained momentum through the early to mid-1980s, so did Williams' reputation as a scratcher, following regular appearances on the all-dayer scene and his Sunday night sessions at Faces International nightclub in Birmingham. This culminated in him teaming up with Danny Poku (later known as D Mob) to co-write and scratch on DSM's "Warrior Groove", released on Elite Records in 1985 and re-released in the same year on 10 Records, a subsidiary of Virgin Records. It was re-released on compilation album Attica Blues Present Drum Major Instinct on X:treme Records, 2001.

== See also ==
- Jazz Fusion
- Jazz-funk
- New Romantics
