= Vice Squad =

Vice Squad may refer to:

- Vice squad, a police division
- Vice Squad (band), an English punk band
- Vice Squad (1953 film), an American film noir
- Vice Squad (1959 film), a French crime film
- Vice Squad (1978 film), or Victims of Vice
- Vice Squad (1982 film), an American exploitation crime thriller
- Vice Squad (TV series), a 2001 German series
- The Vice Squad, a 1931 American film

== See also ==
- Miami Vice (disambiguation)
