= Vipertime =

British jazz band

- Origin: Leeds, England
- Genres: Jazz, Afrobeat, world, Punk, Post-punk
- Years active: 2018–present
- Label: HPBC Records
- Website: vipertime.bandcamp.com

Vipertime are a British instrumental group formed in Leeds in 2018. They consist of saxophone, bass guitar and two drum kits. Their music combines elements of jazz, afrobeat, post-punk and dub.

== Career ==
After forming as a free-improvising group at basement house parties in Leeds' Hyde Park, the band started rehearsing and composing before recording and self-releasing their All Our Heroes Are Dead EP in July 2018. This led to more shows and soon the band settled on a line-up of Ben Powling on tenor saxophone, Matías Reed on bass guitar alongside Luke Reddin-Williams and Charlie Grimwood on drums.

During this period Powling and Reed wrote the material for Vipertime's debut album Shakedown, drawing on the influences of Mulatu Astatke, Pharoah Sanders and Gang Of Four as well as their peers in the current UK jazz scene. The album was recorded at Eiger Studios in Leeds and released on HPBC Records in May 2019. Shakedown received radio play on Worldwide FM, BBC Radio 3 and BBC Introducing and notable shows from this period include Lancaster Jazz Festival, Smugglers Festival, Band On The Wall in Manchester, Brudenell Social Club in Leeds and Hootananny Brixton in London. Writing for Jazz Revelations, Ben Lee noted that on Shakedown the group "capture the energy of their post-punk influences and improvise skillfully like their free jazz idols to create ... a cauldron of moshable jazz".

In 2020 the band released Live At Smugglers Festival, a Bandcamp-only EP raising funds for the charity Solidaritech. The EP was recorded at the eponymous festival the previous September and "bares the ferocity, abandon and razor-sharp senses of the band’s live performance".

Vipertime released a new single 'Limbs' and B-side 'All Our Heroes Are Dead' on HPBC Records on 5 February 2021, which received radio pay on Gilles Peterson's BBC Radio 6 Music show and Worldwide FM plays from Colin Curtis (DJ) and Tina Edwards. These tracks mix the band's trademark "Nubian scales and punk aggression" with the influence of saxophonists Steve Grossman and Gato Barbieri.

In May 2022 the band released their single 'Beatviper' and followed this with 'Head Up (feat. Franz Von)' in November 2022. Both singles came out on HPBC Records and featured drummer George Hall replacing Charlie Grimwood.

On 5 May 2023 the band released their second album Arise and followed this with a 10-date UK tour. Described as “technically outstanding and phenomenally imaginative” by Louder Than War, the album received radioplay from Gilles Peterson and Iggy Pop on BBC Radio 6 Music, Jamie Cullum on BBC Radio 2 and YolanDa Brown on Jazz FM. The album includes guest appearances from Jasmine Myra (Gondwana Records) on alto saxophone, Mick Bardon on cello, and vocals from Jamaican-born, Sheffield-based hip-hop and afro-fusion artist Franz Von. Louder Than War placed the album at #64 in their Albums Of 2023 list.

In November 2023 George Hall left the band to focus on his solo project and his work with Jasmine Myra. He was replaced by Josh Smout. In 2024 Vipertime were selected for the Jazz North 'Northern Line' scheme and used this funding to undertake a nine-date UK tour in early 2025.

In 2025 the Vipertime collaborated with Kentish post-punk band Moron Butler to record Vipertime & Moron Butler, released on Property Of The Lost in 2026. Recorded in both Leeds and Kent, the album features various combinations of the bands' two line-ups. Louder Than War praised the album's "political punk...angular rhythm and cutting attack"

== Discography ==
=== Albums ===
- Shakedown (2019)
- Arise (2023)
- Vipertime & Moron Butler (2026)

=== EPs ===
- All Our Heroes Are Dead (2018)
- Live at Smugglers Festival (2020)

=== Singles ===
- Augury (2019)
- Limbs/All Our Heroes Are Dead (2021)
- Beatviper (2022)
- Head Up (feat. Franz Von) (2022)
- Waugh & Peace (2026)
- Handcarved Coffins (2026)
