= Colin Curtis =

Colin Curtis may refer to:

- Colin Curtis (baseball)
- Colin Curtis (DJ)
