= Captor =

A captor is someone who holds others in captivity. It may refer to:

== Entertainment ==
- Captors (album), the debut studio album of Christian metal band Wolves at the Gate (2012)
- The Captors (novel), a novel by John Farris (1969)
- "Captors", a song by I Concur (2008)
- Sollux and Mituna Captor, characters in the webcomic Homestuck (2009–2016)

== Military use ==
- Euroradar CAPTOR, or Captor-M, the radar system of the Eurofighter Typhoon
- Mark 60 CAPTOR (enCAPsulated TORpedo), the United States Navy 's primary anti-submarine naval mine
- USS Captor (PYc-40), a 1938 Q-ship of the United States Navy

== See also ==
- Cardcaptor Sakura, Japanese manga series (1996–2000)
- Ninja Captor, Japanese live-action television drama (1976–1977)
