= The Expelled =

English punk rock band

- Origin: Leeds, England
- Genres: Punk rock, street punk
- Years active: 1981–1984; 1999–2003
- Labels: Riot City, Captain Oi! Records

The Expelled were a punk rock band first formed in July 1981 in Leeds, England. The original line-up consisted of lead vocalist Jo Ball, guitarist Tim Ramsden, bassist Craig 'Macca' McEvoy and drummer Rick Fox.

== History ==
After gigging around Leeds, the band signed a record deal with Riot City Records after Rick Fox gave a demo tape to the drummer of Vice Squad, (one of the groups chief influences). They went on to release a three track extended player and a single both in 1982, and then do a John Peel session on BBC Radio 1 in December 1982.

Ball left in 1983 and the band tried out several female vocalists, touring with one (Jewlie) and recording two songs with another (Penny, a girlfriend of Vice Squad guitarist Dave Bateman), before deciding to carry on as a three piece with McEvoy taking over on vocals.

The new line-up recorded four tracks for an unreleased 12", 'Waiting for Tomorrow', before Riot City Records ran into financial problems and the band split in May 1984.

McEvoy went on to play bass for The Underdogs, Fox played drums for Cross Connection, and Tim Ramsden hung up his guitar.

Following the release of a 1999 compilation album on the Captain Oi! label, Fox put the band back together and the original line-up rehearsed, but never gigged, before going their separate ways.

Still determined to reform the group Fox asked Becky Laurance, the singer with another band he had joined around this time, The Tricycle Thieves, to front The Expelled and again contacted McEvoy who brought with him Dougie, the lead guitarist from his other band, The Poison Hearts. The new line-up toured for several years.

Fox now plays drums in The Measles. Under his alias 'The Colonel', he also manages punk covers band Kerpunk!

== Discography ==
=== Singles ===
- "No Life, No Future" (1982) Riot City Records
- "Government Policy" (1982) Riot City Records
- 'Waiting for Tomorrow' (Unreleased)

=== Compilation album ===
- Punk Rock Collection (1999) [Captain Oi]
