= The Ejected =

English punk rock/Oi! band

- Origin: Dagenham, London, England
- Genres: Punk rock, indie rock, alternative rock, heavy metal
- Years active: 1981–1983, 1999, 2014, 2015
- Members: "Big Man" Jim Brooks; Jonny "Rockstar" Romain; Paul "Bobby Black" Berry; Tobias "t-bomb" Thacker
- Past members: Gary Sandbrook; Mick "Sticks" Robinson; Paul Griffiths; Paul Quain "Dynamo" Kev Pallett

The Ejected were an English punk rock/Oi! band from Dagenham, London, active mainly between 1981 and 1983.

== History ==
The band was formed by ex-Dawn Patrol members Big Jim Brooks (vocals, guitar), Gary Sandbrook (bass, vocals), and drummer Mick 'Sticks' Robinson. They cited UK Subs, Cockney Rejects, Angelic Upstarts and The Clash as major influences. Signing to the Riot City label, their first release was a contribution to the various artists compilation Carry On Oi. 1982 saw the release of the band's debut EP Have You Got 10p, a song which once saw the band answered by a shower of 10p coins throughout their set. The EP reached number 8 in the UK Indie Chart, and saw the band receive a lot of press coverage, including an interview by Garry Bushell in Sounds. This was followed by the Noise for the Boys EP, and debut album A Touch of Class, with Paul Griffiths replacing Robinson on drums.

Sandford then left the band for a short while, replaced by former 'D.I.R.T.' bassist Paul Quain for the Press The Button EP.

When it came to recording the second album Spirit of Rebellion in 1983, Quain went 'missing' for some months and so Sandford returned to the fold, with the band also acquiring a second guitarist, Kev 'Dynamow' Pallett. This album was produced by UK Subs' Nicky Garratt and achieved a much fuller sound.

A further EP entitled 'Public Animals' remained unreleased due to the folding of Riot City Records, and the subsequent splitting up of the band.

All four members then went on to form pop/reggae outfit 'The New Hawaiians' for a while before Sandford and Griffiths left to form '4 Minutes to Moscow' with 'Hawaiians' backing singer Karen Schouw on keyboards and 'Tish' on guitar. Brooks went on to form pop/reggae outfit Jo Jo Republic.

In 1999 The Ejected reformed, with the original lineup of Brooks, Sandford and Robinson, recording some extra tracks for a best of album which also included the unreleased 'Public Animals' EP.

In 2014, The Ejected have reformed again for the TNT festival in Hartford, Connecticut during Labor Day Weekend and recently played at the Rebellion Punk Festival in Blackpool. Sessioning for the band are Sol Silver band members, Jonny Romain (Guitar), Paul Berry (Bass) and Danny Blair (Drums).

== Discography ==
Chart placings shown are from the UK Indie Chart.

=== EPs ===
- Have You Got 10p? EP (1982) Riot City (#8)
- Noise for the Boys EP (1983) Riot City (#28)
- Press The Button EP (1983) Riot City (#32)

=== Albums ===
- A Touch of Class (1983) Riot City
- The Spirit of Rebellion (1984) Riot City
- Back From The Dead! (2016) Randale Records
- Game of Survival! (2017) Randale Records
- Come 'n' Get It! (2018) Randale Records

=== Compilations ===
- The Best of the Ejected (1999) Captain Oi!
