= Chaos UK =

English punk rock band

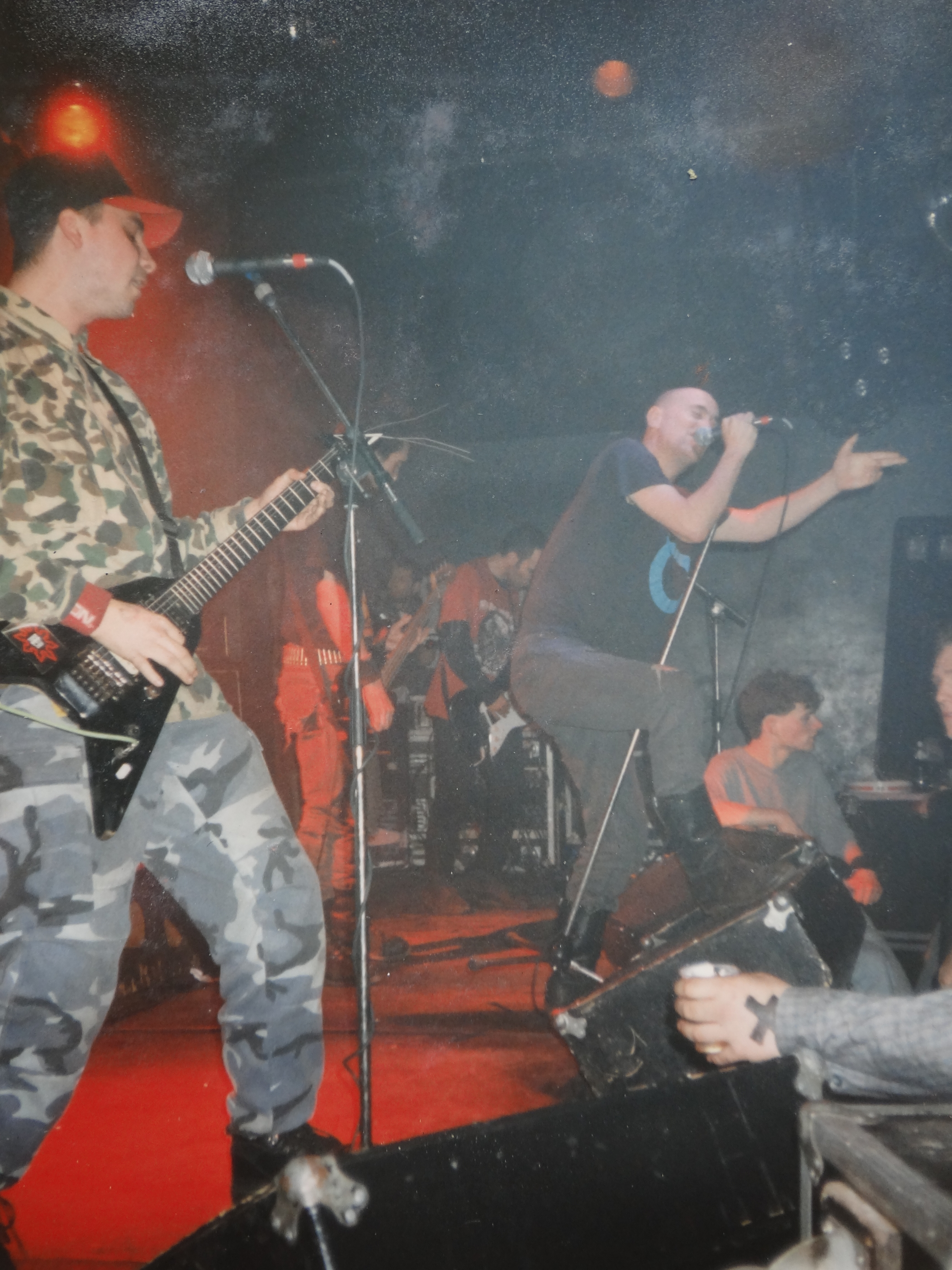
- Chaos UK performing live in Arnhem, Netherlands in 1995

Background information
- Origin: Portishead, Somerset, England
- Genres: Hardcore punk, anarcho-punk, street punk
- Years active: 1979–present
- Labels: HG Fact, Century Media, Riot City Records, Children of the Revolution Records, Cargo Records, Desperate Attempt Records, Cleopatra Records, Discipline Records, Black Konflik Records
- Members: Chaos; Mower; Chuck
- Past members: Simon Greenham; Andy Farrier; Richard Potts; Beki; Vic; Steve; Phil Thudd; Gabba

Chaos UK is an English punk rock band formed in 1979 in Portishead, near Bristol. They emerged as part of the anarcho-punk scene, developing a fast and aggressive hardcore punk style. The band recorded two EPs and a full LP for Riot City Records. In the process, they, along with fellow Bristolians Disorder and Stoke's Discharge, revolutionized the hardcore punk scene. In particular, the Japanese '80s hardcore punk bands were heavily influenced by Chaos UK and Disorder's brutal take on punk. Chaos UK's debut LP was notable in the fact that the band's label claimed it was the "fastest, noisiest LP in the cosmos" in the short-lived "Punk Lives" magazine. Vocal duties on this recording were also handled by bassist Chaos.

The original line-up consisted of Simon Greenham (vocals), Andy Farrier (guitar) and Adrian Rice (bass, aka Lice and later Chaos/Kaos) finally joined by Richard Potts (drums, aka Potts). The mid-1980s saw an almost new line-up, with Chaos remaining the only original member. He was joined by Mower on vocals, Gabba on guitar (previously with Nottingham's The Seats of Piss), and Chuck on drums. Over the rest of the 1980s, Chaos UK were the mainstay and lynchpin of the UK hardcore punk scene playing many hundreds of shows around the world, including Japan (the first English punk band to do so, but with a stand-in drummer: Blackmore of Bristol punk band Lunatic Fringe), the United States, Mexico, and all over Europe.

Mower eventually left the band and Gabba would go on to use new songs in new band FUK.

Gabba died in March 2026.

== Discography ==
Chart placings shown are from the UK Indie Chart.

=== Releases ===
Independent chart placings

- Demo (1981)
- Burning Britain E.P. 7" (Riot City. Riot 6, 1982) No. 8
- Loud Political & Uncompromising 7" (Riot City. Riot 12, 1982) No. 27
- Chaos UK LP (Riot City, 1983) No. 16
- Short Sharp Shock 12" (COR/Weasel, 1984)
- Just Mere Slaves 12" (Selfish, 1984)
- Chaos UK/Extreme Noise Terror split LP (Manic Ears, 1986)
- Chipping Sodbury Bonfire Tapes LP (Slap Up/Weasel, 1989)
- Headfuck 7" (Desperate Attempt, 1989)
- Head on a Pole 7" (Desperate Attempt, 1991)
- Enough to Make You Sick LP (Vinyl Japan, 1991)
- Chaos UK/Raw Noise split LP (Vinyl Japan, 1991)
- Live in Japan LP/CD (Cargo, 1991)
- Total Chaos LP/CD (Anagram, 1991)
- Death Side/Chaos UK split CD (Selfish, 1993)
- 100% Two Fingers in the Air Punk Rock 12"/CD (Slap Up/Century Media, 1993)
- Secret Men 7" (Slap Up, 1993)
- Floggin' the Corpse CD (Anagram, 1996)
- King for a Day 7" (Discipline, 1996)
- Morning After the Night Before CD (Cleopatra, 1997)
- Heard It, Seen It, Done It LP/CD (Discipline, 1999)
- Chaos UK/Assfort split 12" (Discipline, 2000)
- Kanpai 12"/CD (Discipline, 2000)
- Chaos UK/FUK split CD (HG Fact, 2007)
- Digital Filth CD/EP (Break The Records, 2015)
- Shit Man Fucker! EP (540 Records, 2016)
- Just Mere Slaves CD (Black Konflik, 2020)
- Stunned To Silence CD (Black Konflik, 2020)

=== Reissues ===
- The Singles LP (Riot City, 1984 - includes first two 7"s) No. 31
- Short Sharp Shock CD (Anagram, 1991)
- Radioactive Earslaughter/100% Two Fingers in the Air CD (Anagram, 1993)
- The Best of Chaos UK CD (Anagram, 1999)
- Enough to Make You Sick/Chipping Sodbury CD (Anagram, 1993)

=== Compilations ===
- Punk and Disorderly LP (Abstract/Posh Boy, 1982) "4 Minute Warning"
- Riotous Assembly LP (Riot City Records, 1982) "Senseless Conflict"
- UK/DK LP (Cherry Red, 1983) "No Security"
- Digging in Water LP (COR, 1986) "Kill Your Baby" a different/faster version
- Punks Not Dread LP (Sink Below, 1991) "For Adolfs Only", "Bone Idol", "Brain Bomb"
