= Jasmine Myra =

British saxophonist and composer

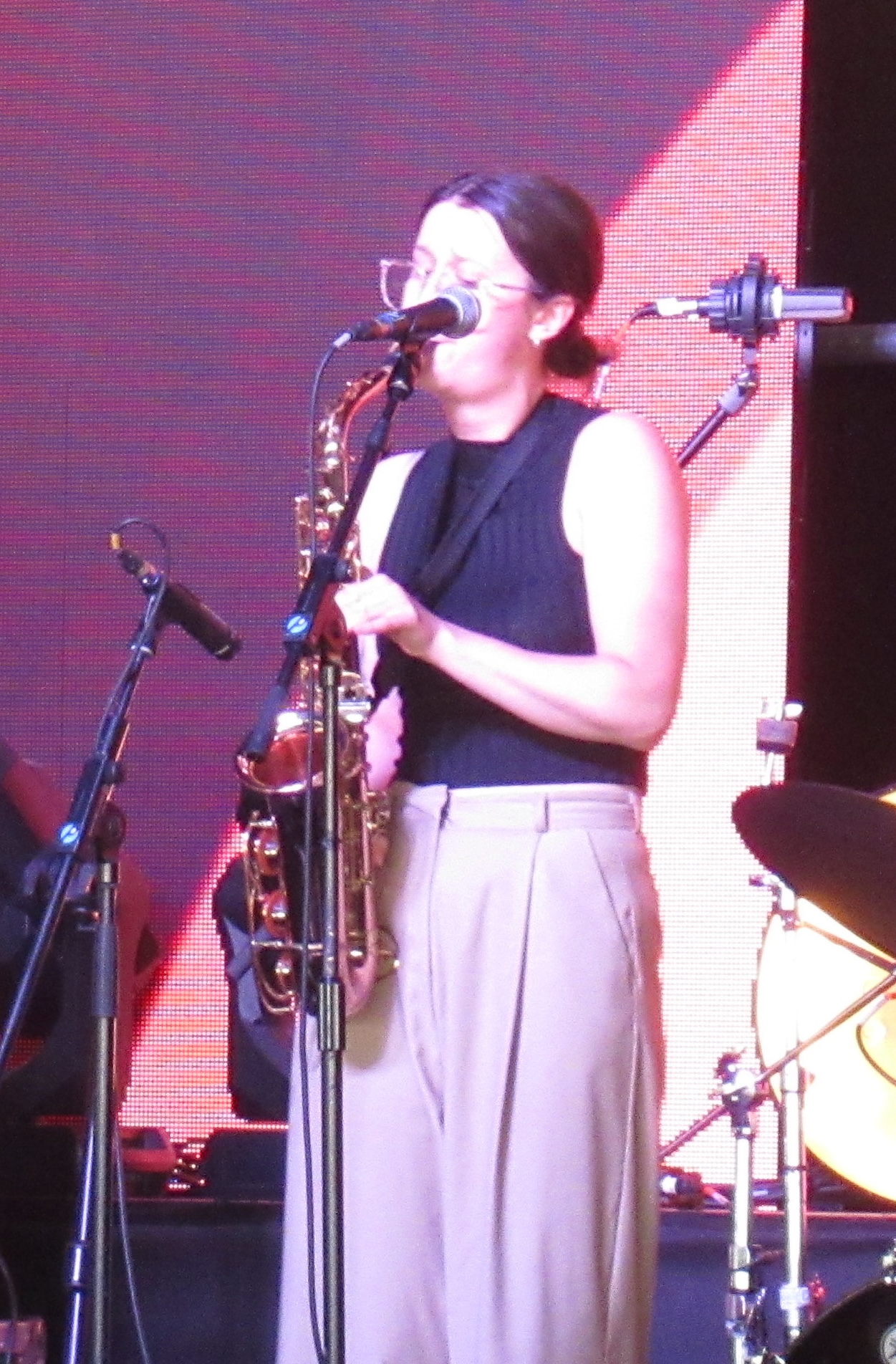
- Myra in 2023

Background information
- Born: August 13, 1997 (age 28); Leeds, Leeds, West Yorkshire, England
- Genres: Spiritual jazz
- Instrument: Alto saxophone
- Label: Gondwana Records
- Formerly of: Abstract Orchestra

Jasmine Myra (born 1996 or 1997) is a British saxophonist and composer known for her work in spiritual jazz.

== Early life and education ==
Myra studied violin at her primary school in Leeds before switching to saxophone at age 14, which she played in high school big bands. She worked at Leeds' All Brass and Woodwind music shop. She attended the Leeds Conservatoire for jazz performance, where she developed an interest in hip-hop and studied with pianist Robert Mitchell.

== Career ==
While at Leeds, Myra began performing with the Abstract Orchestra. She also founded a self-titled group, Jasmine.

In 2019, Myra was approached by trumpeter and Gondwana Records head Matthew Halsall about joining the label. She began composing her debut album, Horizons, at home during the COVID-19 pandemic. Released in 2022, the record featured "dense" original compositions inspired by Kenny Wheeler's large ensemble works.

In April 2023, Myra debuted at East London's Brick Lane Jazz Festival in what DownBeat called "an assured first performance promising greater depths to come." Her second album, Rising, was released in May 2024. Jazzwise praised it for demonstrating Myra's growing "confidence and poise" as a soloist and composer.

In addition to Wheeler, Myra has cited Grover Washington Jr., Nala Sinephro, Shabaka Hutchings, and Soweto Kinch as musical influences.

== Discography ==
- Horizons (2022, Gondwana Records)
- Rising (2024, Gondwana/Universal)
- Where Light Settles (2026, Gondwana Records)
