= Get a Life (Vice Squad album) =

Studio album by Vice Squad
- Released: December 7, 1999
- Genre: Punk
- Label: High Speed

Vice Squad chronology
The BBC Sessions (1997)	Get a Life (1999)	Resurrection (1999)

Professional ratings
Review scores
Source	Rating
AllMusic	2.5/5 stars

Get a Life is an album by British punk band Vice Squad. It was released in December 1999 by High Speed Records on CD and in 2024 by Black White Head Records on LP.

== Track listing ==
1. "Get a Life"
2. "You Can't Buy Back the Dead"
3. "Princess Parandia"
4. "The Great Fire of London"
5. "Westend Stars"
6. "Maid to Measure"
7. "Allergy"
8. "Business as Usual"
9. "No You Don't"
10. "Powerdrill"
11. "Take Too Many E's"
