= Buen Chico =

English indie rock band

- Origin: West Yorkshire
- Genres: Indie rock
- Years active: 2003–present
- Members: Morgan Tatchell-Evans (vocals, keys, guitar); John (bass, vocals); Alan Kenworthy (drums); Matthew Haigh (guitar, vocals)
- Past members: Tudor Tatchell-Evans (vocals, guitar); Kirsty Dolan (bass, vocals); Heather Sowden (bass, vocals); Simon Marks (drums); Ben Wood (guitar)
- Website: buenchico.com

Buen Chico (Good Guy) are an indie rock band from West Yorkshire who formed in 1998.

== History ==
The band was formed in 1998 by school friends Tudor Tatchell-Evans (singing, guitar), Heather Sowden (bass, singing), Morgan Tatchell-Evans (guitar, singing) and Simon Marks (drums) began writing songs and playing gigs in the Calderdale area. After frontman Tudor's death in 2000, the band recruited Matthew Haigh (guitar, singing), with Morgan taking over lead vocals and most of the songwriting. A cassette EP was released in early 2001 featuring home recordings of songs recorded before Tudor's death.

Two more EPs were released in 2002, featuring the results of the band's first sessions in professional studios, and the band began gigging in the wider West Yorkshire region. In 2003, Matthew and Simon left the band to focus on their other outfit, Lucida Console, with Heather also leaving to pursue a career in medicine.

Morgan Tatchell-Evans recruited Kirsty Dolan (bass, singing) and Alan Kenworthy (drums), and soon moved over to Leeds where Kirsty and Alan both lived. The trio gigged around the country over the next few years and in 2007 released their first album, 'Right to Re-Arrange', on Faith & Hope Records. Their sophomore effort, 'Our Love's Enormous', was issued on the band's own Geek Love Records imprint the following year.

This flurry of activity was succeeded by a break of sorts, with the bandmates variously venturing into a'capella music (Morgan), funk and soul (Alan) and teaching high school English (Kirsty). By 2010, 'The Seasons EP', featuring the first lyrical collaborations between Morgan and Kirsty, was ready for release on Philophobia Music.

2012 saw the return of Matthew Haigh, with Morgan switching to playing keys during live performances. Work is underway on a new EP, slated for release in 2013

== Members ==
- Morgan Tatchell-Evans - vocals, keys, guitar
- John - bass, vocals
- Alan Kenworthy - drums
- Matthew Haigh - guitar, vocals

== Discography ==
=== Albums ===
- Right to Re-Arrange (2007)
- Our Love's Enormous (2008)
- Working for a Work Free Future (2016)

=== EPs ===
- The Seasons (2011)
- The Patron Saint of Lost Causes (2013)
- Crooks (2019)
