= Miami Vice (disambiguation) =

Miami Vice is a 1980s American television series.

Miami Vice may also refer to:

== Miami Vice franchise ==
- Miami Vice (film), a 2006 film adaptation of the TV series
- Miami Vice (video game), a 1986 video game based on the TV series
- Miami Vice: The Game, a 2006 tie-in video game based on the film
- Miami Vice Theme, theme song for Miami Vice

== Other uses ==
- "Miami Vice" (song), 2019 song by Gims
- Miami Vice Squad, an indoor football team in Coral Gables, FLA, USA
- Miami Vice FC, a soccer team in Fort Lauderdale, FLA, USA
- Miami-Dade Sheriff's Office vice squads
- Miami Vice (Dexter: Original Sin), an episode of the American TV series Dexter: Original Sin
- Miami Vice (cocktail), a cocktail combining strawberry daiquiri and piña colada

== See also ==
- Vice City (Grand Theft Auto fictional city), Grand Theft Auto fictional city based on Miami
