= Abstract Orchestra =

British hip hop group

- Also known as: Abstract Orchestra
- Origin: Leeds, England
- Genres: Hip hop, jazz, funk
- Years active: 2011 – present
- Label: ATA Records
- Members: Rob Mitchell; Anna Uhuru; Joost Hendrickx; Chris 'Fatty' Hargreaves; George Cooper; Simon 'Bobby' Beddoe; Malcolm Strachan; Jack Davis; Jim Corry; James Russell; Simon Kaylor; Dan Brunskill; Kev Holbrough; Oli Rath; George Hardwick; Richard Jones; Madeleine Fitzgerald; Alex Marshall

Abstract Orchestra are a British hip hop music group, created in 2011 by Rob Mitchell. The group is signed to independent record label ATA Records. Abstract Orchestra have released five studio albums, Dilla (2017), Madvillain Vol. 1 (2018), Madvillain Vol. 2 (2019), Fantastic 2020 Vol. 1 (2019) and Fantastic 2020 Vol. 2 (2019), and five singles, New Day (2017), Fancy Clown (2018), Air ft MF DOOM (2019), Pray (2020), Jealousy (2020). The "ensemble has become renowned for their distinct sound, which reinterprets some of the most famous hip-hop productions of all time (right on down to the sample material) into a unique blend of big band jazz and live hip-hop".

== Band members ==
Abstract Orchestra is conducted and led by Scottish Saxophonist Rob Mitchell, who also writes and arranges the music, and produces the recordings. In addition to Mitchell conductor, the band includes Joost Hendrickx on drums, Chris 'Fatty' Hargreaves on bass, George Cooper on keyboards, Anna Uhuru vocalist, Jim Corry, Dan Brunskill, James Russell and Simon Kaylor saxophones and flutes, Jack Davis, Malcolm Strachan, Simon 'Bobby' Beddoe on trumpets, Kev Holbrough, Oli Rath, George Hardwick and Richard Jones on trombones, Madeleine Fitzgerald Violin, Chris Heron Violin, Alex Marshall Cello.

Band members have worked with Slum Village, MF Doom, Jamiroquai, Corinne Bailey Rae, Mark Ronson, Amy Winehouse, John Legend & The Roots, Roots Manuva, Rag'n'Bone Man, Adele, Estelle and Lily Allen.

== Style ==
"Led by Rob Mitchell, the Abstract Orchestra are a self-styled big band known for their impressive live performances. They explore the shared territory between jazz and hip hop by taking modern classics such as Madvillain and J Dilla's back catalogue and filtering them through classic arrangement techniques."

Abstract Orchestra blends jazz orchestration with hip hop beats and MC's. The group also explores a number of influential sounds favoured by hip-hop producers, such as Motown, Jazz, TV soundtrack and film scores. Rob Mitchell cites his influences as Quincy Jones, Lalo Schifrin, David Shire, Paul Riser, Bob Brookmeyer, Gil Evans, J Dilla, Madlib, and MF Doom.

== History ==
The group was formed in 2011 by Rob Mitchell and Dave Walker, initially for a one-off event at The Wardrobe club in Leeds. The event led to further performances including support for Mos Def aka Yasiin Bey, Filming for the MOBO awards in 2014, and supporting Talib Kweli and the Zulu Nation tour in 2015.

Abstract Orchestra's debut album Dilla was released in 2017 and covered the music of Detroit producer J Dilla. This was followed by the 'Abstract Orchestra Does Dilla' UK Tour in 2017, and included venues Jazz Café, O2 Academy Sheffield and Band on the Wall.

For their second and third releases Madvillain Vol. 1 (2018) and Madvillain Vol. 2 (2019), Abstract Orchestra covered the music of the collaboration between producer Madlib and rapper MF Doom, known as Madvillain. Abstract Orchestra released a single titled "Air" in 2019 that included the vocal a cappella by MF Doom.

Mitchell recounts: "In the live set I [would] use an MPC to trigger Doom's lyrics over the band. Last year in the final part of the mix stage I just thought wouldn't it be amazing to have Doom on the track just like when we do it live! Dabrye released Doom's acapella to Air and so I thought if I could get permission to use it the track would be perfect!"

After a UK tour in 2018 with Illa J, Abstract Orchestra collaborated with the brother of J Dilla, Illa J releasing the single "New Day" (2018).

In the summers of 2017 and 2018 Abstract Orchestra performed at a number of UK festivals including Boomtown, Shambala, Secret Garden Party, Latitude, Green Man and Kendal Calling.

After a UK tour with Hip-hop group Slum Village in 2019, Abstract Orchestra were asked by Slum Village to rework their album Fantastic, Vol. 2 the rework was released as 'Fantastic 2020 Vol. 1' (2019) and 'Fantastic 2020 Vol. 2'. "Hip-hop with a live band, especially a big band style such as this, becomes something so much greater, taking on a new form."

In 2020 Abstract Orchestra collaborated with Young RJ (one half of Slum Village) and Mega Ran on the album 2 Hands Up.

== Discography ==
=== Studio albums ===
Title	Details
Dilla	Released: 2017; Label: ATA Records; Format: Vinyl, Digital download, CD
Madvillain Vol. 1	Released: 2018; Label: ATA Records; Format: Vinyl, Digital download, CD
Madvillain Vol. 2	Released: 2019; Label: ATA Records; Format: Vinyl, Digital download, CD
Fantastic 2020 Vol. 1	Released: 2019; Label: Ne'Astra; Format: Vinyl, Digital download, CD
Fantastic 2020 Vol. 2	Released: 2019; Label: Ne'Astra; Format: Vinyl, Digital download, CD

=== Singles ===
Title	Details
Jealousy	Released: 2020; Label: Ne'Astra; Format: Digital download
Pray	Released: 2020; Label: Ne'Astra; Format: Digital download
Air (Abstract Orchestra Remix)(Feat. MF DOOM)	Released: 2019; Label: ATA Records; Format: Digital download
Fancy Clown	Released: 2018; Label: ATA Records; Format: Digital download
New Day ft. Illa J	Released: 2017; Label: ATA Records; Format: 45 Vinyl, Digital download

=== Collaborations ===
Title	Details
2 Hands Up by Young RJ and Mega Ran	Released: 2020; Label: Ne'Astra
