= Old school jazz dance =

Old school jazz dance (also known as UK jazz dance) refers to the improvised dancing style that originated in the UK in the 1970s. The style grew in clubs in the UK, mainly in London and in northern cities, with the sounds of bebop, Afro-Cuban jazz, fusion, swing and other Latin-influenced jazz and funk.

== History ==
It predates hip hop and breakdancing – the American dance culture, which did not reach the UK shores until 1982–1983.

Starting in the heart of second generation African Caribbean-African homes and community venues, it preceded the takeoff in the heart of cities, nightclubs and discos all over the country. Built on the dance steps and spirit of celebration of their first generation (1950s, 1960s) immigrant parents; who were connoisseur record collectors; top-dancers and fashion icons who pioneered the underground live music and sound system scene. Second generation were encouraged in early learning (by first-generation parents) to value improvising to their own freestyle music of their day modern and swing jazz; blues; ska; R&B; calypso; soul; rocksteady; rock 'n' roll; reggae; gospel; country 'n' western.

DJ Paul Murphy is generally credited with having begun the trend of playing high tempo jazz, bebop and fusion records to dancers in the early 1980s in London nightclubs such as The Horseshoe (or "Jaffa's") on Tottenham Court Road and the Electric Ballroom on Camden High Street, along with young London DJ Gilles Peterson.

Some of the crews in the early 1980s included the Birmingham 'Spades' - recognisable from their grey cut-off sweatshirts with the 'barefoot' logos printed front and back. In Manchester there were many jazz dance crews; one of the most memorable were the Manchester 'Riffs' - their trademark look was sunglasses (worn during a dance battle), shaven bald heads and leather jackets, the same outfit as worn by the New York street gang The Riffs in the film 'The Warriors'.

Blackpool (Mecca), Birmingham (Hummingbird, Locarno), Manchester (Ritz, Berlins, Hell, et al.), Preston, Nottingham, Derby, Wolverhampton, Stoke-on-Trent, Wigan (Cassanelli's), were all notable towns and cities where 'All-Dayers' (all day discothèques) were popular playing both soul music, jazz funk and fast tempo Jazz. Lasting usually from 2:00 pm to 11:00 pm they were staple hangouts for the northern youth of mainly (but not exclusively) black heritage and essential on the jazz dancing scene.

== Characteristics ==
Another battle involved a dancer dancing out of his shoes performing a series of jazz dance moves, then effortlessly dancing back into his shoes.

The Jazz Defektors were the first to form and perform, IDJ, Jazzcotech, The Floor Technicians, Brothers in Jazz, The Celtic Soul Brothers, The Backstreet Kids and other pioneers formed in cities and towns across the country.

== Style and clothing ==
Jazz dancers became quite creative in their style of dress, almost uniform like in attention to detail. Depending on where one was in the country at the time, one would have seen most of the dancers adhere to the basics which included:

- Shoes - Usually colourful patent leather (blacks, reds, and blues were popular). They were usually styled low on the instep and worn with white sports socks to gain maximum contrast and therefore highlight the speed and intricacy of the footwork. Spats were also popular amongst the dancers but any shoe with a hard sole was accepted. Never training shoes.
- Jeans - Jazz dance culture coincided with the popularity of stretch jeans and many dancers wore them. They wore them tight and they liked to unpick the seams either side of each leg at the bottom, rising up 3 or 4 inches to give the impression of a very petit 'flare'. This also highlighted the patent leather shoes and socks combination quite well. Another popular trend was to sew a pin stripe seam down the front and back of each of the jean's legs where the natural seam would be formed if ironed like trousers. Bleach splashing of denim jeans also became popular as well as coloured jeans - reds, whites, electric blues were all quite standard Jazz Dance attire.
- Upper Body - This was quite individual and ranged from a simple T-shirt sometimes with motif, to 'crew shirts' with printed insignia and personalised names and images. Some dancers opted for the short military jacket with epaulettes and decorative buttons and braiding. Sweatshirts with cut off sleeves and rough fraying, British punk band T-shirts and 'Batwing sleeves' were all seen on the dance floors of Britain in the Jazz Dance era.
- Hats - Most 'steppers' (an affectionate name used within the community to refer to a Jazz dancer) wore their hair cut very short and topped of their individual looks with a hat. Some wore Panama hats, Trilbys. Most opted for the French beret, often rolled up and pulled tight to the skull. Again the headgear was deliberately colourful to complete the dancers outfit.
- Hair - Around the time of jazz dancing's greatest popularity, a television dance act called Hot Gossip (went on to be known as Ruby Flipper) had several black members who had dyed their close-cropped hair bleach blonde. This style somehow filtered its way in to the underground Jazz Dance scene and many dancers copied the look. This opened the door to other experimental colour treatments for hair with 'Zebra' print and 'Leopard' print treatments becoming popular and a general 'punk rock' style was seen around many northern venues. Other memorable traits included 'Tramlines' – where lines were cut into the close cropped hair to give the appearance of a parting. Sometimes the parting went all the way around the head quite similar to the lines on a standard green tennis ball. Another style that was popular was using the hair clippers to create a sharp pointed 'receding hairline' either side of the head.
- Accessories – Dancers were known to carry a 'Beer Towel' (often found on bars in pubs, supplied by Breweries to mop up spillage) with them, sometimes hanging out of one of their back pockets. The main purpose of this was to use to wipe away sweat after an energetic dance session but was acceptable to carry one on any occasion. Cravats and ornate walking sticks were also popular as well as a small bandanna (about half the size of a normal bandana and made from a lighter material) twisted around and tied loosely around the neck. This also was a good way to control the running perspiration after dancing. Towels draped around the neck were also commonplace.
