= The Flying Hendersons =

English indie rock band

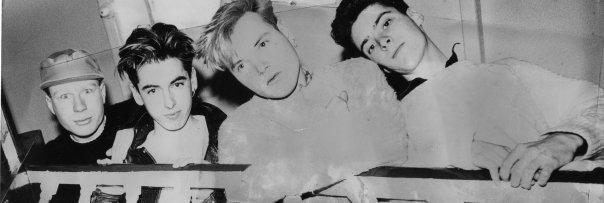

The Flying Hendersons were a Yorkshire-based indie band that formed in Leeds in summer 1986, Initially a 5-piece unit known as Budda, Budda playing one live gig under this name at the University of Leeds, supporting Snapdragons on 17 October 1987 with the Sex Gods and Ramones headlining in the Riley Smith Hall.

By early 1987, despite achieving some success and a small cult following as Budda Budda, the band changed their name to The Flying Hendersons. Now with only four members, They performed a handful of live concerts, spending most of their time in the studio. In early 1988, they played their last gig at the Infamous Asylum Club, Manchester and then disbanded.

Their only recording that survived from the 1987 Nyrex studio sessions in Manchester was the unreleased single, "Scam Man" / "Electric Hands", which to this date has never been officially released into the public domain.

In 1989, Jules and Steve linked up with Leeds band The Kennedy Pill. After a nationwide tour they released their only single, "Beside the Sea", before disappearing into obscurity. Jules then went on to complete his degree, whilst Steve continued to concentrate and develop his career as an industry respected sound engineer and formed the band Klammer. Bill moved to Manchester and then later, left the UK to live and work overseas in Moscow and the Middle East. Meanwhile, Graham pursued a teaching career. The band's influences were extremely varied; however, there was some leaning towards the Leeds gothic rock scene at the time, with such bands as The Sisters of Mercy, The March Violets and The Mission providing a source of inspiration for the lyrics and style, especially in the early days of the band.

The Flying Hendersons were contemplating a comeback gig in 2017 to mark their 30th anniversary. Nothing came of this venture.

== Original line-up 1986–88 ==
- Graham Charles (vocals)
- Robert (Bill) Mills (drums)
- Julian Coultas (guitar)
- Steve Whitfield (bass)

== Nynex recordings 1986–87 (studio) ==
- "Ghost of Time"
- "Electric Hands"
- "Scam Man"
- "Run (Mescaline trip)"
- "Seventh Reflection"
- "Luxury"
