= Jazz-funk =

Subgenre of jazz music

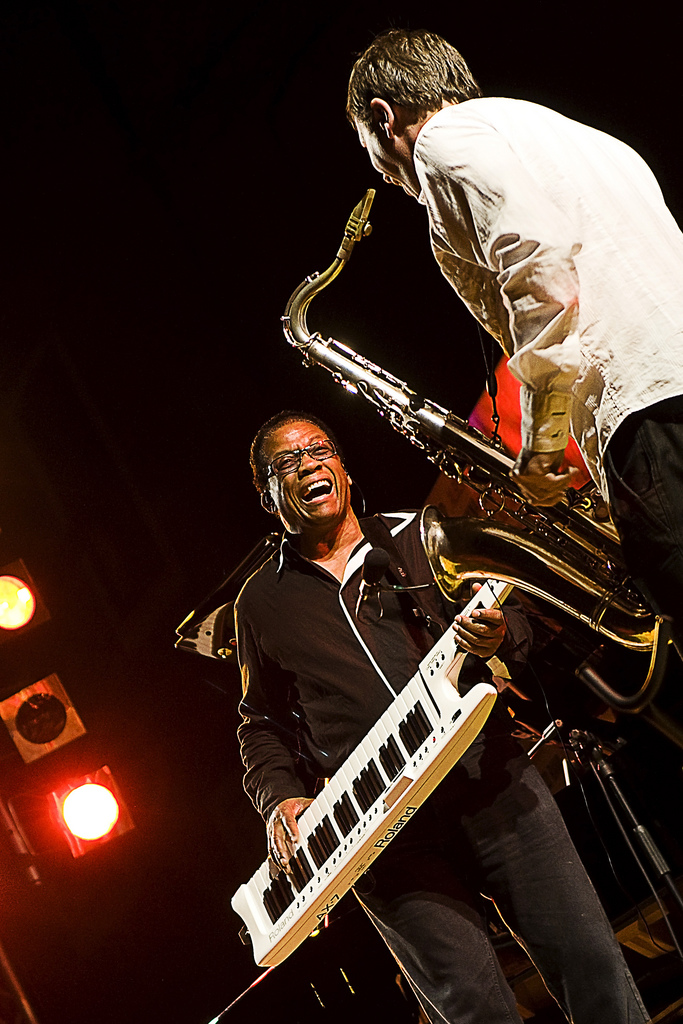
- Herbie Hancock, one of the pioneers of jazz-funk
- Stylistic origins: Jazz; funk; soul; R&B
- Cultural origins: Late 1960s – 1970s, United States

Subgenres
- Free funk

Other topics
- Jazz fusion, rare groove

Jazz-funk is a subgenre of jazz music characterized by a strong back beat, electrified sounds, and analog synthesizers. The integration of funk, soul, and R&B music and styles into jazz resulted in the creation of a genre that ranges from pure jazz improvisation to soul, funk or disco with jazz arrangements, jazz riffs, jazz solos, and sometimes soul vocals. Similar genres to jazz-funk include acid jazz.

== History ==
Jazz-funk generally exhibits a simple structure based around one or two riffs, and a harmonic structure that allows musicians to improvise. Modern jazz-funk music was influenced by Herbie Hancock. The Mizell Brothers were producers for many jazz and soul artists. Examples of early jazz-funk albums include Miles Davis' On the Corner (1972) and Jimmy Smith's Root Down (1972). The Last Poets, Gil Scott-Heron, Lightnin' Rod, T.S. Monk, Pleasure, Boogaloo Joe Jones, Lenny White, Don Blackman, Monk Higgins, Wilbur Bascomb, the Blackbyrds, Donald Byrd, Les DeMerle, and Michael Henderson released jazz-funk albums.

Jazz-funk musicians used electric instruments, such as the Rhodes Piano or electric guitar, bass guitar, organ, particularly in jazz fusion. Herbie Hancock played ARP Odyssey synthesizer and clavinet on the album Head Hunters (1973).

Some mainstream artists in jazz used specialist producers to commercial success. Larry and Fonce Mizell produced jazz-funk artists such as Johnny "Hammond" Smith, Gary Bartz, Roger Glenn, the Blackbyrds, and Donald Byrd.

== UK jazz-funk ==
In the UK's nightclubs of the mid–late 1970s, DJs including Colin Curtis in Manchester, Birmingham's Graham Warr and Shaun Williams, and Leeds-based Ian Dewhirst and Paul Schofield championed the genre, along with Chris Hill and Bob Jones in the South.

London-based jazz-funk pioneers drew a new audience to jazz: notably pirate radio stations Invicta 92.4 and JFM. In the late 1980s, rare groove crate diggers – DJs in England who were interested in looking back into the past and re-discovering old tunes – Norman Jay and Gilles Peterson achieved prominence.

While the majority of jazz-funk bands are American, British jazz-funk artists and bands emerged in the late 1970s and early 1980s. They were encouraged by club DJs such as Chris Hill and Robbie Vincent, who was then on BBC Radio London, and Greg Edwards, who had a show on London's first commercial radio station, Capital Radio. They launched a jazz festival in 1980, where the jazz-funk band Light of the World performed. Jazz-funk was also played on Europe's first soul station, Radio Invicta, and pirate radio stations such as Solar Radio, Horizon, and Kiss FM. The first of these bands to establish a UK identity was Light of the World, formed by Kenny Wellington, Jean-Paul 'Bluey' Maunick, and other musicians.

Acid jazz is a related jazz genre which places more emphasis on groove, similar to funk, hip-hop, and club dance music. Incognito, the Brand New Heavies, Jamiroquai, and the James Taylor Quartet helped the acid jazz movement surge in popularity. UK group US3 signed to Acid Jazz Records, founded by Peterson and Eddie Piller. US3 covered "Cantaloupe Island", originally recorded by Herbie Hancock.
