= Abrasive Wheels =

English punk rock band

- Origin: Leeds, West Yorkshire, England
- Genres: Hardcore punk, street punk
- Years active: 1976–1984, 2003–present
- Labels: Riot City, Clay
- Members: Phil "Shonna" Rzonca; Chris Bertram; Mat Black; Daniel "Corporal Vinnie" Garthwright
- Past members: Dave Ryan "Harry" Harrison "Nev" Nevison; Robert Welch; Adam Rzonca; Mark Holmes; Dave Hawkridge; Peter Clough; Steve "Skruff" Owen; Eden Townsley; Steve Popplewell; Mickey Waddington; Jordan Woodhead; Lloyd Rees-Carr; Dave Ingledew; Daniel "Corporal Vinnie" Garthwright

Abrasive Wheels are a punk rock band of the late 1970s – early 1980s. They hailed from Leeds, England and were seldom out of the Independent charts between 1980 and 1984 when the band split. The band were Shonna Rzonca – vocals, Dave Ryan – guitar, Harry Harrison – bass, Nev Nevison – drums. In 2002 the singer Rzonca reformed the band with new members.

== History ==
The band formed in 1976 and initially consisted of Phil "Shonna" Rzonca on vocals, Dave Ryan on guitar, Daves cousin Robert Welch on bass guitar, and Phils brother Adam Rzonca on drums. The name Abrasive Wheels was inspired by Rzonca's engineering apprenticeship, where signs stating "Danger! Abrasive Wheels!" were regularly seen. They made their first public appearance at a friend's party in 1977, which was followed by a Rock Against Racism gig at Leeds Polytechnic. They were given a support slot opening for the UK Subs in Bradford, after which Adam and Rob left the band, they made contact with Leeds-born drummer Martin Taylor who began to play drums with the band and went on to record a demo tape at September Sound studios in Huddersfield. Martin left the band after several appearances on the Slaughter and the Dogs tour support to pursue his own musical projects. At this time they employed the services of a mutual friend on Bass, eventually both were replaced by Mark Holmes and Dave Hawkridge. With this line-up the band recorded their first demo, and toured with Slaughter & the Dogs. After losing money trying to get a record released by a London label Dave and Rzonca financed their own EP, releasing it on their Abrasive Records label. Hawkridge and Holmes then left, to be replaced by "Harry" Harrison on bass and "Nev" Nevison on drums, both previously of The Urban Zones, this is considered by Rzonca to be the band's first "proper" line-up. The EP was picked up by Red Rhino distribution and soon sold out of its 3000 pressing, reaching number 35 on the UK Indie Chart. The band then signed to Riot City Records and issued the Vicious Circle EP, which was followed by a re-release of their debut EP, both again indie hits. Their debut album, When the Punks Go Marching In, was released later in 1982. They then signed to Clay Records, and released a cover version of Elvis Presley's "Jailhouse Rock". Their second album,> Black Leather Girl was released in March 1984, displaying a much slicker and glossier sound with vocal harmonies, but after a further single, the band split later that year after a lengthy international tour.

Rzonca worked as a taxi driver before opening pizza parlours in Leeds, and working on the local market. Rzonca formed a new version of the band in 2002, with Dave, Harry and Nev, and Steve Popplewell on second guitar. Dave, Harry and Nev left after several gigs. A new album was written and recorded during this brief time but has never been released. Rzonca and Popplewell continued, recruiting Eden, Chris, and Skruff. A new album, SKuM, was released in 2009.

Recent line up changes: Skruff left the band in 2010 and was replaced by Mickey Waddington. Following their European tour, Eden left the band in 2011. Jordan Woodhead joined on guitar in 2013 followed by Mat Black in 2014 also on guitar duties along with Lloyd Rees-Carr on drums where they then went into a process of writing & recording new songs for a new album and started to gig locally to get back onto the scene. A slot at the Rebellion Festival followed in August 2014 in front of a packed house. Jordan & Lloyd left due to conflicts within the band at the end of 2014. Stepping into the band were Mickey Waddington (who had previously taken over when Skruff left) on drums and Alex Greatrex on guitar.

== Discography ==
=== Albums ===
==== Studio albums ====
Title	Album details	Peak chart positions
Title	Album details	UK Indie
When the Punks Go Marching In	Released: November 1982; Label: Riot City; Formats: LP, MC	3
Black Leather Girl	Released: March 1984; Label: Clay; Formats: LP	8
Skum	Released: 21 December 2009; Label: Crashed Out; Formats: CD	—
"—" denotes releases that did not chart.

==== Live albums ====
Title	Album details
Captured Live!	Released: 1982; Label: Chaos Cassettes; Formats: MC; Limited numbered release

==== Compilation albums ====
Title	Album details
The Punk Singles Collection	Released: 1995; Label: Captain Oi!; Formats: CD, LP
The Riot City Years 1981–1982	Released: September 2003; Label: Anagram; Formats: CD

==== Video albums ====
Title	Album details
Limited Edition	Released: 1984; Label: Jettisoundz Video/Clay; Formats: VHS

=== EPs ===
Title	Album details	Peak chart positions
Title	Album details	UK Indie
The Army Song (ABW EP)	Released: April 1981; Label: Abrasive; Formats: 7"	35
Vicious Circle EP	Released: February 1982; Label: Riot City; Formats: 7"	12
The Army Song (ABW EP)	Released: March 1982; Label: Riot City; Formats: 7"; Re-release	24
Nothing to Prove	Released: February 2007; Label: SOS; Formats: CD	—
"—" denotes releases that did not chart.

=== Singles ===
Title	Year	Peak chart positions
Title	Year	UK Indie
"Burn 'em Down!"/"Urban Rebel"	1982	14
"Jailhouse Rock"/"Sonic Omen"	1983	13
"Banner of Hope"	1983	10
"The Prisoner"/"Christianne"	1984	27

==== Other song releases ====
- "Maybe Tomorrow" (re-recording of originaltrack from Black Leather Girl) download only single (2007)
- "Skum" Title track Pre Release from new album in the making streamlined on Myspace (2008–2009)
- "Fight the Enemy" Pre Release from new album in the making streamlined on Myspace (2008–2009)
- "Crazy Town" Pre Release from future album streamlined on YouTube (2014)

==== Compilation appearances ====
- "Criminal Youth" appears on Riotous Assembly (Riot City – 1982)
- "Army Song" and "Shout It Out" appear on 100% British Punk
- "Banner of Hope", "Jailhouse Rock" and "Prisoner" appear on Clay Records Punk Singles Collection
- "Army Song" appears on Punk and Disorderly, Vol. 1
- "Vicious Circle" appears on Punk and Disorderly, Vol. 2: Further Changes
- "Burn 'em Down" appears on Punk and Disorderly, Vol. 3: The Final Solution
- "Vicious Circle", "Army Song" and "Burn 'em Down" appear on Riot City Punk Singles Collection (Vol.1)
- "Juvenile" and "Urban Rebel" appear on Riot City Punk Singles Collection (Vol.2)
- "Sonic Omen" appears on If The Kids Are United- The Punk Box Set
