= Colin Curtis (DJ) =

British DJ (born 1952)

- Birth name: Colin Dimond
- Born: 1952 (age 72–73)
- Origin: Madeley, Staffordshire, England, United Kingdom
- Genres: R'n'B, Northern soul, Disco, Jazz funk, Jazz fusion, Electro, Hip hop, House
- Occupation: DJ
- Years active: 1967–present
- Website: Colin Curtis Connection

Colin Curtis (born Colin Dimond; born 1952) is a British DJ whose career spans several decades and musical developments.

== Biography ==
He was born and grew up in Madeley in Staffordshire, UK. Although he is most closely associated with the 1970s Northern soul scene, he has been described by the author and musician Mark 'Snowboy' Cotgrove as:

...one of the most important black music tastemakers there has ever been in the UK

As a teenager in the 1960s, Curtis developed a passion for music through listening to offshore radio stations such as Radio Caroline and through a friend's sister who would listen to Tamla Motown records at their house. He then became interested in collecting black American music through attending Northern soul all-nighters at clubs such as the Twisted Wheel in Manchester and, later, the Golden Torch in Tunstall, Stoke. He began DJing in the late 1960s, firstly at the Crystal Ballroom in Newcastle-under-Lyme but later became part of the resident DJ line-up at the Golden Torch all-nighters, which included Tony Jebb, Ian Levine and Keith Minshull.

In 1973, after the closure of the Golden Torch, Curtis began a weekly residency at the Blackpool Mecca’s Highland Room soul nights and was joined by fellow DJ and collector Ian Levine in a partnership which lasted until 1978. Hitherto, the Northern soul scene had been a revivalist movement built around obscure US recordings from the 1960s which conformed to a certain rhythmic and vocal template. However, the Curtis/Levine duo are noted for successfully introducing contemporary styles of African-American music such as disco, funk and jazz funk onto their Highland Room playlists and, as a result, the creation of a split in the Northern soul movement which led to the parallel modern soul subgenre. Levine and Curtis are also credited with being amongst the first DJs to introduce mixing to British nightclubs. This technique, which had been pioneered by DJ Francis Grasso in the clubs of New York City, enabled the DJ to create a non-stop sequence of records.

In September 1978, after quitting his weekly spot at the Blackpool Mecca, Curtis began a residency at Rafters nightclub in Manchester where his playlists continued to include soul and disco but leaned more heavily towards jazz funk and fusion. He also continued to DJ at all-day soul festival events at venues such as the Manchester Ritz and the Blackpool Mecca, regularly playing before crowds of between 1500 and 3000 people. Around the years 1982 to 1983, whilst continuing to DJ at events around the country, he began to move towards more exclusively jazz sets at clubs such as Berlin in Manchester and is credited as pioneering the UK jazz dance scene in the North of England.

In the mid-1980s, Curtis became interested in the latest developments in dance music emanating from the US including New York electro and hip hop and the first wave of house music from Chicago, typified by artists such Chip E, Steve ‘Silk’ Hurley and Farley Jackmaster Funk. In 1986 he became one of the earliest British DJs to play these records at venues such as Rock City in Nottingham alongside DJs such as Johnathon, Greg Wilson, Graeme Park and Simon Bassline Smith. At the end of the 1980s, Curtis went into semi-retirement from his DJing career due to a spell of bad health. In the early 1990s he concentrated on his computer games business but since that time he has resumed his DJing career, playing Northern soul and jazz funk ‘revival’ sets at various venues such as the Ruby Lounge in Manchester and the King Georges Hall in Blackburn. In August 2010 he played two sets in the 1970s-themed Soul Casino arena and 1980s-themed Warehouse arena at the Vintage at Goodwood Festival.

== Bibliography ==
- Neil Rushton (2009). Northern Soul Stories: Angst and Acetates. Soulvation. ISBN 978-0-9564569-1-5.
- Mark Cotgrove (2009). From Jazz Funk & Fusion to Acid Jazz: The History of the UK Jazz Dance Scene. Chaser Publications. ISBN 978-1-4389-7360-9.
- David Nowell (2001). Too Darn Soulful: The Story of Northern Soul. Robson Books. ISBN 1-86105-431-9.
