= Vice Squad (band) =

English punk rock band

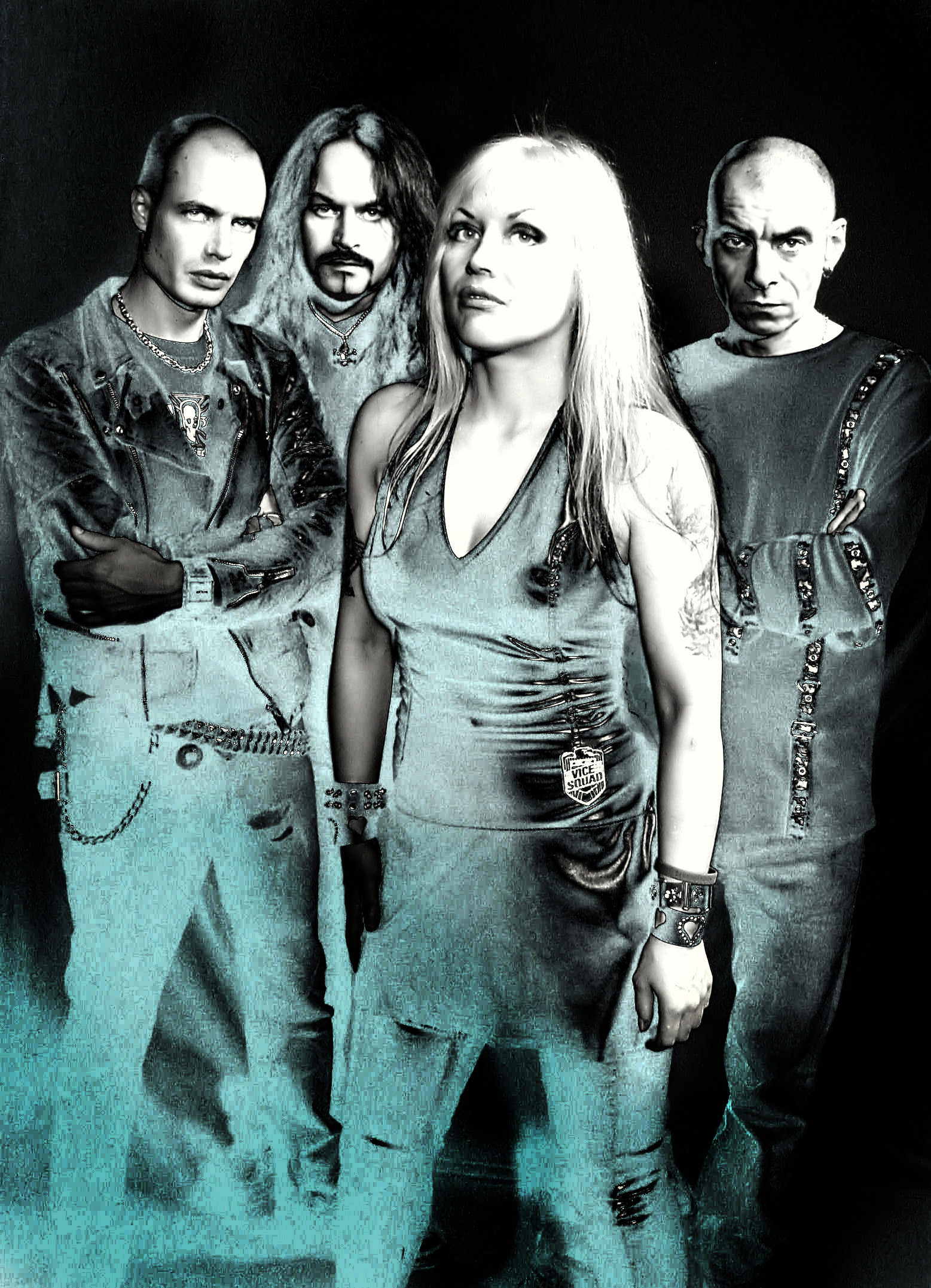
- Vice Squad in 2005

Background information
- Origin: Bristol, England
- Genres: Punk rock, street punk
- Years active: 1979–1985, 1997–present
- Labels: Heartbeat, Riot City, EMI, Anagram, SOS, Sudden Death, Rhythm Vicar, Last Rockers
- Members: Beki Bondage; Paul Rooney; Wayne Firefly; SkullmAnt
- Past members: Original band: Dave Bateman †; Mark Hambly; Shane Baldwin †; Julia 'Lia' Rumbelow; Mark 'Sooty' Byrne; Jon Chilcott; Michael 'Silk Mildred' Giaquinto; Wayne Cotton; Kev Taylor; Tony 'Sid James' Piper; Peter Munro; Django
- Website: www.vicesquad.co.uk

Vice Squad are an English punk rock band formed in 1979 in Bristol. The band was formed from two other local punk bands, The Contingent and TV Brakes. The songwriter and vocalist Beki Bondage (born Rebecca Bond) was a founding member of the band. Although there was a period of time when the band had a different vocalist, she reformed the band in 1997. Since 2008, the band have been releasing records on their own label Last Rockers.

== History ==
=== Original band ===
Vice Squad was formed in 1979 in Bristol. The initial line-up of Beki Bondage (vocals), Dave Bateman (guitar), Mark Hambly (bass guitar) and Shane Baldwin (drums), and played its first gig at Bristol University's Anson Rooms on 12 April 1979. Bateman and Baldwin had previously been members of the TV Brakes. The first release by Vice Squad was the track "Nothing", which was included on the 1979 compilation Avon Calling. Members of the band were involved in setting up the Riot City label with Simon Edwards, the label becoming one of the major punk labels of the era. Vice Squad took some time to make further impact, only playing six gigs in 1980. Its first single, "Last Rockers" in 1981, was well-received, selling over 20,000 copies and spending almost forty weeks in the UK Indie Chart, reaching number 7. The follow-up, "Resurrection", reached number 4, and the band undertook a tour supporting U.K. Subs. The singles received airplay and support from BBC Radio 1 DJ John Peel, and the band went on to record two sessions for his show, in 1981 and 1982.

In 1981, the band signed with the major label EMI (on their Zonophone subsidiary), prompting criticism from many within the DIY punk scene. Their first album, No Cause For Concern, was released in late 1981, reaching number 32 in the UK Albums Chart. A second album, Stand Strong Stand Proud, followed in 1982, and the band embarked on a tour of the United States and Canada. On returning from the US, Bondage announced that she was leaving the band. She went on to front Ligotage and later Beki and the Bombshells, and, without her, Vice Squad were dropped by EMI. The band carried on, however, replacing Bondage with a new singer called Lia (who was previously known as Jools and had been the singer for local band Affairs of the Heart). The new line-up, also including the band's manager Mark "Sooty" Byrne on second guitar, signed with Anagram Records, and recorded a session for David Jensen's BBC radio show. Indie hits continued with singles such as "Black Sheep" and "You'll Never Know", but sales dwindled, and the band split up in 1985.

=== New band ===
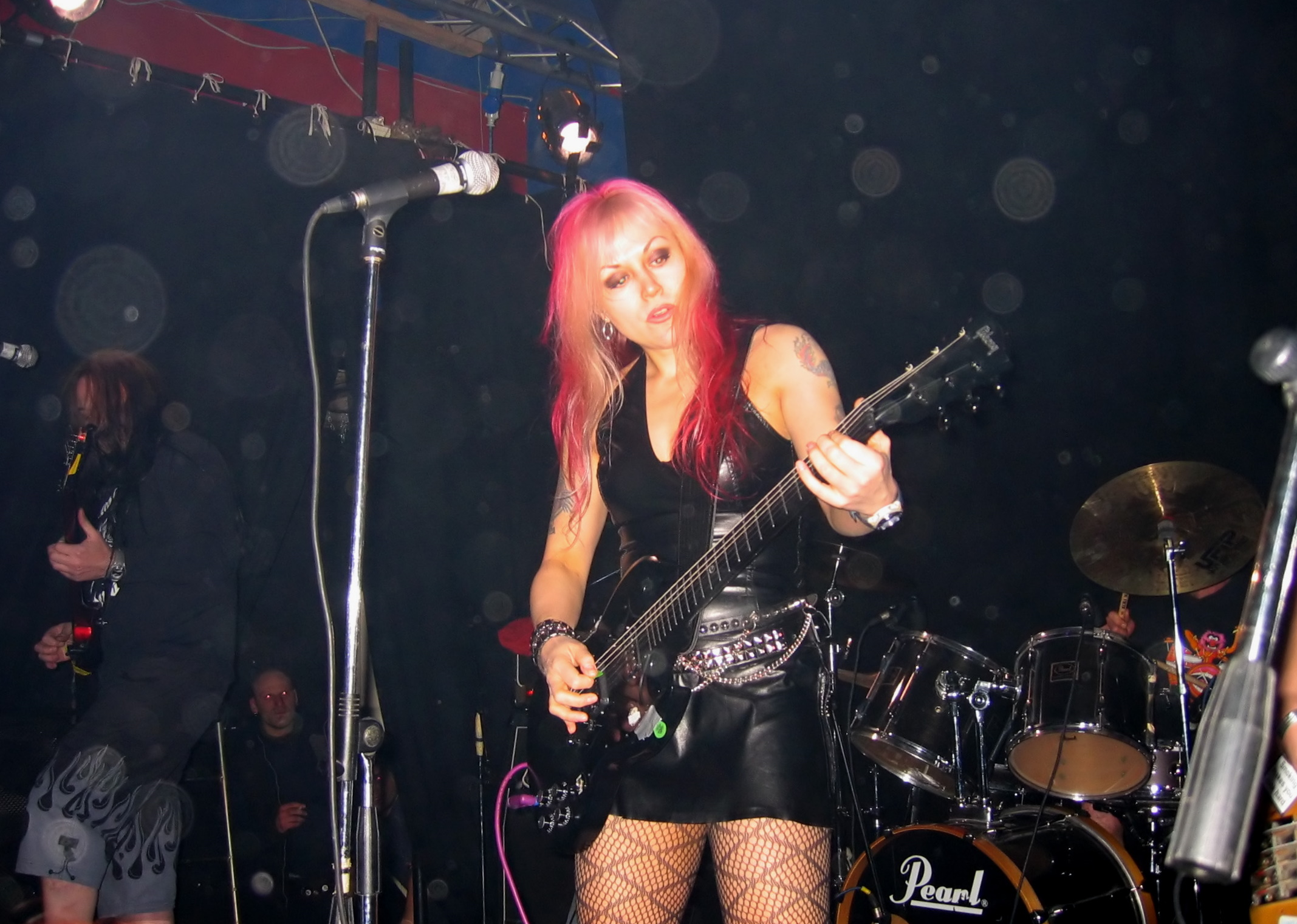
Performing in 2005

Bondage formed a new version of Vice Squad in 1997, along with former members of The Bombshells, after being persuaded to perform the old material at the Holidays in the Sun festival. The line-up was initially Bondage on vocals, Paul Rooney (guitar), Stilton (bass guitar) and Pumpy (drums). The rhythm section was replaced by Michael Giaquinto (bass guitar) and Tony Piper (drums) in late 1999/early 2000. This new line-up recorded several albums and toured Europe and the United States. In 2006, they released the album Defiant, produced by Rooney.

Dave Bateman died in 2007.

=== Back to "old school punk" ===
2008 was spent recording the album, Fairground for the Demented which was shelved as the band decided the finished collection of songs did not represent the 'Old School' punk sound that the band wanted to achieve. This collection of songs is currently released in digital form with retailers such as iTunes and Napster. The gritty punk style was eventually realised in 2009 when Vice Squad released the London Underground album which was co-produced by Bond and Rooney. Released on their own Last Rockers Label, London Underground has received rave reviews on the Studs And Punks website and songs such as "Punx United", "Old Skool" and "Sniffing Glue" form a major part of the band's live show.

Vice Squad returned to America in 2009 on an 18 date tour of the western states promoting London Underground with the American drummer Nick Manning, and Wayne Cotton on Bass (Ex Stuntface bass / front man) with support from The Lower Class Brats.

The album Punk Rock Radio was released in 2011.

In 2014, the album Cardboard Country was completed and released on the band's own Last Rockers Records label. The album was funded on with via the band's first ever PledgeMusic campaign. The first 500 copies of the album came with a 6 track EP.

During 2018, the band started recording the album, Battle of Britain. Six singles/EPs were released prior to the album's release, including two versions of Ignored To Death.

On 11 April 2020, due to the lockdown in the UK, The Beki and Lumpy Show was launched on Facebook, featuring Beki and Paul, with videos, chat and quizzes, broadcasting every Saturday evening. The album Battle of Britain was released in October by Last Rockers and Cargo Records.

On 30 January 2024, original drummer Shane Baldwin died. He had been ill and largely immobile for a few years, after suffering a bad fall which saw his body rapidly deteriorate. Despite this, his death was still unexpected. The cause of death was heart failure.

== Discography ==
=== Studio albums ===
- No Cause for Concern (1981) Zonophone (UK No. 32)
- Stand Strong Stand Proud (1982) Zonophone (UK No. 47)
- Shot Away (1984) Anagram
- Get a Life (1999) Rhythm Vicar
- Resurrection (1999) Rhythm Vicar
- Lo-Fi Life (2000) Sudden Death
- Rich and Famous (2003) EMI
- Defiant (2006) SOS
- Unreleased 2008 (2009) Last Rockers
- London Underground (2009) Last Rockers
- Punk Rock Radio (2011) Last Rockers
- Cardboard Country (2014) Last Rockers
- Battle of Britain (2020) Last Rockers

=== Live albums ===
- Live in Sheffield (1981) Chaos Tapes Cat: Live003 – cassette only release – limited edition of 3000

_{Track Listing: A Side: Resurrection / We're Still Dying / Coward / Young Blood. B Side: The Times They Are A Changing / 1981 / Change The Record / Saturday Night Special / Sell Out.}

- Live and Loud!! (1988) Link

=== Compilation albums ===
- Last Rockers – The Singles (1992) Abstract
- The Punk Singles Collection (1995) Anagram
- The BBC Sessions (1997) Anagram
- The Rarities (1999) Captain Oi!
- The Very Best Of (2000) Anagram
- Bang to Rights: The Essential Vice Squad Collection (2001) EMI
- The Riot City Years (2004) Step-1
- Fuck Authority (2007) Anarchy
- Punks for a Princess Vol.2 (2012)

=== Singles and EPs ===
- "Last Rockers" (1980) Riot City (UK Indie No. 7)
- "Resurrection" (1981) Riot City (UK Indie No. 4)
- Special Edition Tour EP (1982) Riot City (UK Indie No. 21)
- "Out of Reach" (1982) EMI/Zonophone (UK No. 68)
- "Stand Strong" (1982) EMI/Zonophone
- "State of the Nation" (1982) Riot City
- "Black Sheep" (1983) Anagram (UK Indie No. 13)
- "You'll Never Know" (1984) Anagram
- "Teenage Rampage" (1985) Anagram (UK Indie No. 44)
- "Lavender Hill Mob" (2000) Combat Rock
- Bah Humbug EP (2010) Last Rockers – limited edition of 50, four track CD single, (includes "Santa Claws Is Coming to Town")
- Rockin Xmas EP (2009) Last Rockers – limited edition of 100, seven track CD single, (includes "Rockin' Around the Christmas Tree")
- London Lowlife EP (2011) Last Rockers – limited edition of 100, four track CD single (tracks: "Drama Queen" / "Plain Jane" / "Jimmy Jaguar" / "Dead Doll")
- "I Wish It Could Be Christmas Everyday" (2012) Last Rockers – limited edition of 500, four track CD single
- "A Dog Is For Life" (2013) Last Rockers – limited edition of 500, four track CD single
- Christmas Hangover EP (2014) Shout Proud – Germany only, limited edition 7" single (3 formats)
- "Run, Run Rudolph" (2015) Last Rockers – limited edition of 500
- Sock It To Me Santa EP (2016) Last Rockers – limited edition of 500, five track CD single
- Hey Mr Christmas EP (2017) Last Rockers – limited edition of 200, four track CD single
- "Ignored To Death" (2018) Last Rockers – limited edition of 500, four track CD single, white sleeve
- "I Dare To Breathe" (2019) Last Rockers – limited edition of 500, five track CD single
- "Mainstream Media" (2019) Last Rockers – limited edition of 500, four track CD single
- "Born in a War" (2019) Last Rockers – limited edition of 500, four track CD single
- "Ignored To Death" (2019) Last Rockers – limited edition of 500, four track CD single, black sleeve
- "When You Were 17" (2020) Last Rockers – limited edition of 500, four track CD single
- Vice-o-lation Vol 1 EP (2020) Last Rockers – limited edition of 300, four track CD single, green sleeve
- Vice-o-lation Vol 2 EP (2020) Last Rockers – limited edition of 300, four track CD single, purple sleeve
- Vice-o-lation Vol 3 EP (2020) Last Rockers – limited edition of 300, four track CD single, red sleeve
- Vice of Spades EP (2021) Last Rockers – limited edition of 300, four track CD single, Motörhead covers EP
- Road Crew EP (2021) Last Rockers – limited edition of 300, four track CD single, Motörhead covers EP
- Rooms at the Top (2022) four track EP
- Bang Bang Bang (2022) four track EP
- Hidden Vices Volume 1 (2022) four track EP
- The Winter of Discontent (2022) five track EP
- If I Knew What I Know Now (2023) four track EP
- Spitfire vs Bomber (2024) four track EP

== Other appearances ==
=== Studio tracks ===
Year	Track name	Release	Label	Catalogue Number
2020	"Lithium"	Punk N' Bleach – A Tribute to Nirvana	Cleopatra Records	CLO1802VL
2020	"Enter Sandman"	A Punk Tribute to Metallica	Cleopatra Records	CLLO1799LP

== Reception ==
AllMusic described the band as significant in the second wave of British punk rock, noting their promotion of animal rights and vegetarianism.
