= I Concur =

English alternative rock band

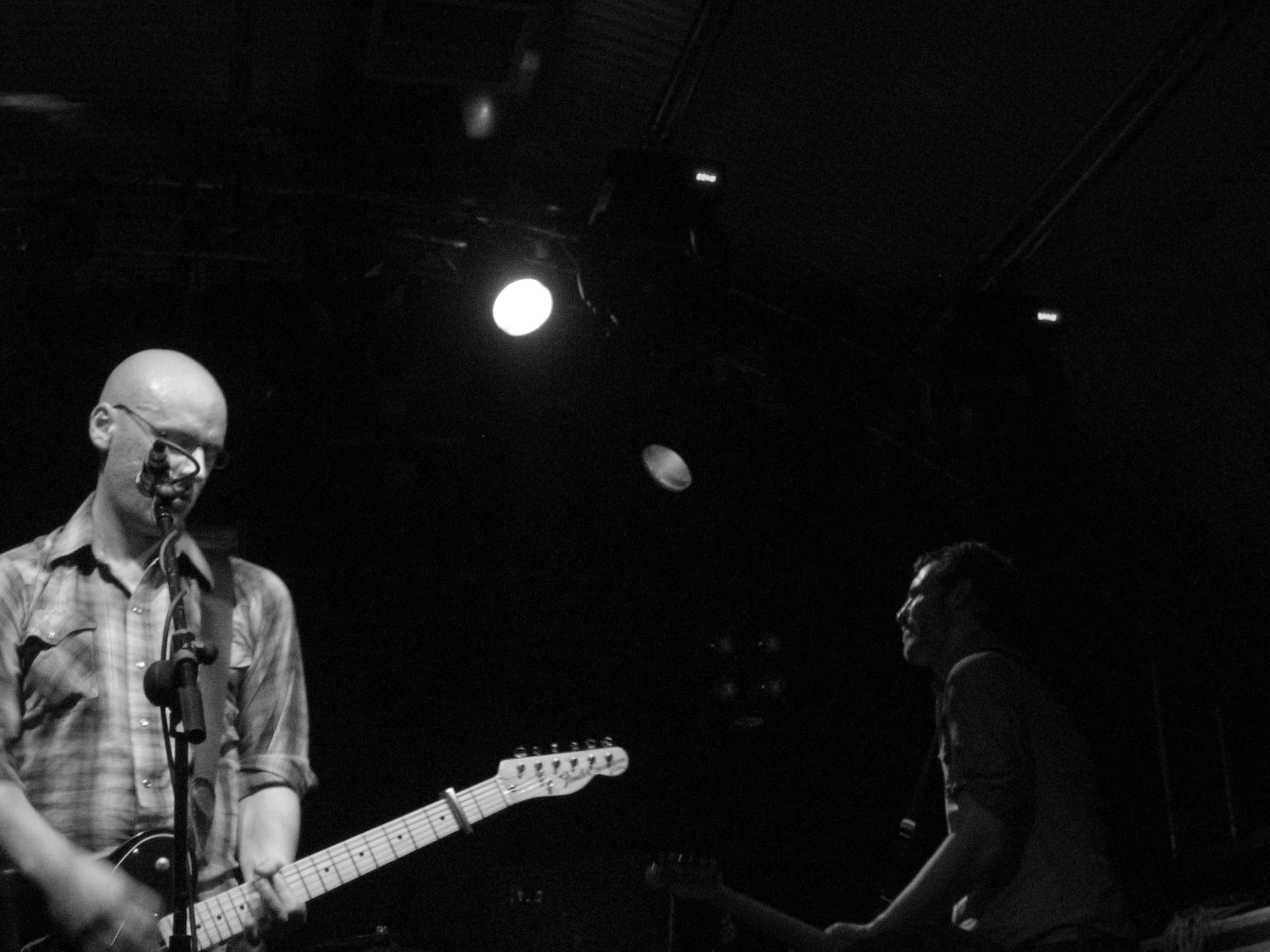

Background information
- Origin: Leeds, West Yorkshire, England
- Genres: Post-rock; alternative rock; indie rock; shoegazing
- Years active: 2006–2012
- Labels: Brew Records, Club AC30

I Concur was an English alternative rock band from Leeds, West Yorkshire, England.

The band was known for using the lyrics to tell unusual stories from modern culture. Subject matter has focused, among other topics, on the Korean stem cell scientist Hwang Woo Suk (on "Decimal Places"), the building of the M62 motorway around Stott Hall Farm (on "Build Around Me") and the American TV series The Wire (on "Sobotka").

== Career ==
I Concur started playing together in late 2006 and their first gig took place at The Packhorse, Leeds, in January 2007. In the subsequent May, the band released their debut EP, Whatever It's Going to Be.

Following a support with The Hold Steady, I Concur were added to the independent record label, Dance To The Radio’s various artists compilation album, Out of the Woods and Trees, then in March 2008, the band released a limited 7" double a-sided single, "Lucky Jack" / "Build Around Me", through Brew Records which was played by Huw Stephens on BBC Radio 1. Following positive reviews, and coverage in the NME, I Concur were invited to record a session for Huw Stephens's BBC Introducing show at the Maida Vale studios.

The following July, BBC Introducing announced that I Concur would play at the Reading and Leeds Festival. The band then released their next single, "Oblige", produced by Tom Woodhead of ¡Forward, Russia!, in October 2008.

In September 2009, I Concur announced that had signed with the London-based record label Club AC30, and the band's debut album, Able Archer, and new single, "Sobotka", were released the following October. Following positive reviews of the album, the band took time away from performing to focus on writing new material.

After six years together, the band announced their decision to split in November 2012. Shortly afterward they released their final album, Burial Proof.

Tim Hann released a solo album under the name break_fold in February 2017.

== Members ==
- Tim Hann - guitar, vocals
- James Brunger - drums, vocals
- Toby Page - bass
- Chris Woolford - guitar

== Discography ==
=== Albums ===
- Able Archer (2009) - Club AC30
- Burial Proof (2012)

=== EPs ===
- Whatever It's Going to Be (2007) - self released

=== Singles ===
- "Lucky Jack" / "Build Around Me" (2008) - Brew Records
- "Oblige" / "Captors" (2008) - Brew Records
- "Sobotka" / "Iterate This" (2009) - Club AC30

=== Compilation albums ===
- Out of the Woods and Trees (2007) - Dance To The Radio
- Brew Records, Volume 1 - (2007) - Brew Records
- Compilation Number 2 - (2008) - On the Bone
