= Beki Bondage =

English singer, songwriter and guitarist

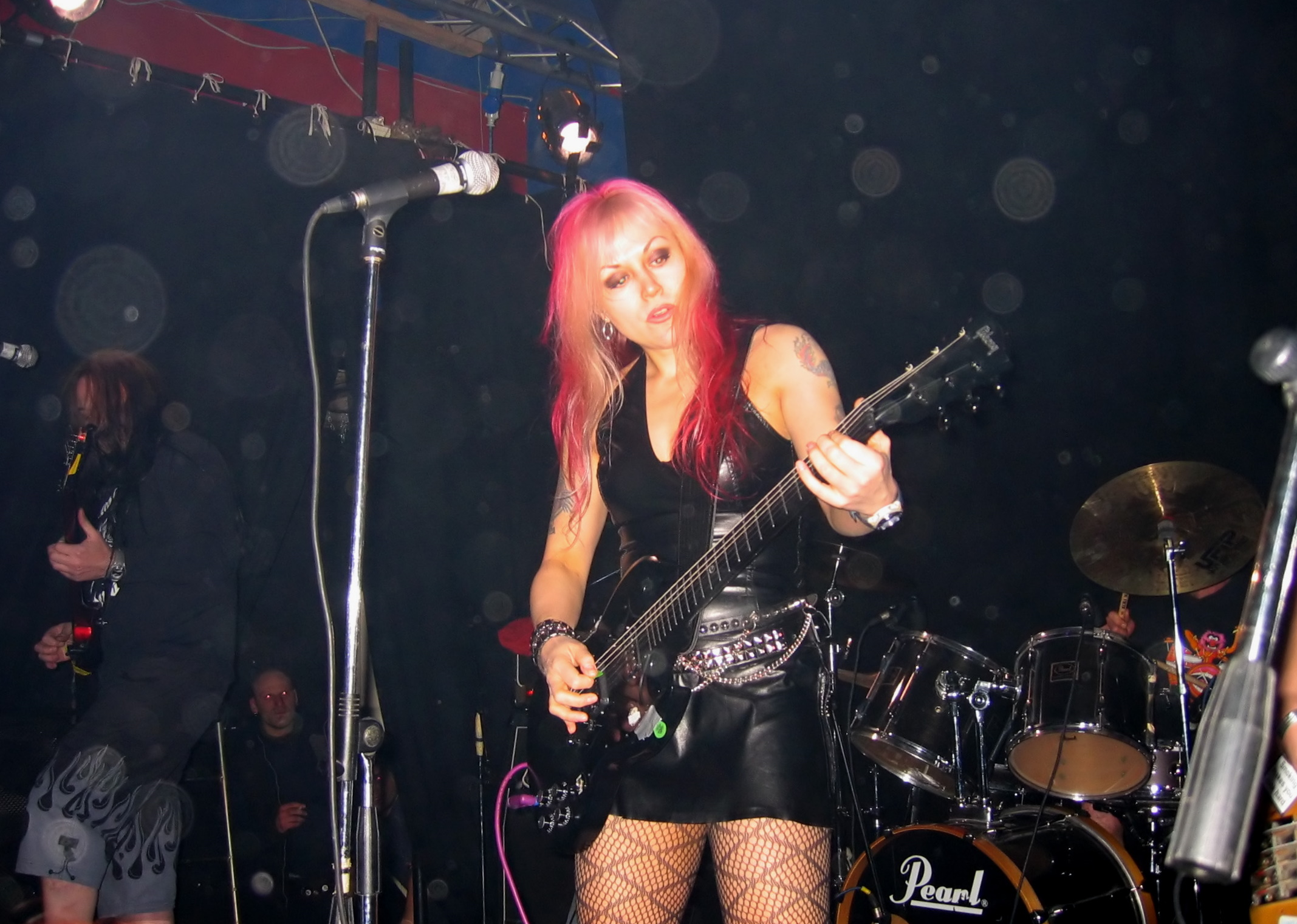
- Performing with Vice Squad in 2005

Background information
- Born: Rebecca Louise Bond; Bristol, England
- Genres: Punk rock
- Occupations: Singer, musician
- Instruments: Guitar, vocals
- Years active: 1978–present
- Label: Riot City/SOS

Beki Bondage (born Rebecca Louise Bond) is an English singer, songwriter and guitarist, best known as the frontwoman of the punk band Vice Squad.

She appeared on the front cover of a number of influential music papers such as Melody Maker, NME, Smash Hits and Sounds.

In 1983, she left Vice Squad to form the band Ligotage with Steve Roberts of UK Subs. Sales of their first single "Crime and Passion" (1983, EMI) were disappointing, and their only album, Forgive and Forget, was released on the independent Picasso Records label.

Following the release of two solo singles in 1985, Bondage formed The Bombshells (often billed as "Beki & the Bombshells") in 1986. The band continued to play on the London club and punk circuit for many years.

In 1998, she reformed Vice Squad with a new line-up; the band continues to record and tour.

She also released a solo record album of covers in 2000 entitled Cold Turkey.
