= Zonophone =

Record label founded in 1899

Universal Talking Machine Company
- Type: Corporation
- Industry: Recording industry
- Founded: 1899
- Founder: Frank Seaman
- Defunct: 1903
- Fate: Acquired
- Successor: Victor Talking Machine Company (immediate); EMI (1931–2013); Warner Music Group (2013–present)
- Headquarters: Camden, New Jersey, U.S.
- Products: Phonographs, phonograph records
- Owner: Seaman, Eldridge R. Johnson, EMI, then Warner Music Group

Zonophone (early on also rendered as Zon-O-Phone) was a record label founded in 1899 in Camden, New Jersey, by Frank Seaman. The Zonophone name was not that of the company but was applied to records and machines sold by Seaman's Universal Talking Machine Company from 1899 to 1903. The name was subsequently acquired by Columbia Records, the Victor Talking Machine Company, and finally the Gramophone Company/EMI Records. It has been used for a number of record publishing labels by these companies.

== 1899–1910s ==
Emile Berliner, the inventor of the lateral-groove disc record and the Gramophone, formed a partnership with machinist Eldridge R. Johnson, who had improved Berliner's Gramophone to the point of marketability, and with former typewriter promoter Frank Seaman. Berliner was to hold the patents; Johnson had manufacturing rights; and Seaman had selling rights.

== 1920s–1970s ==
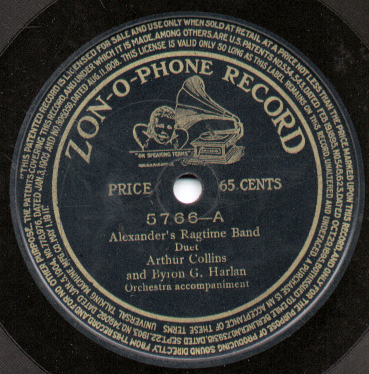
A Zon-O-Phone record

In West Africa (primarily today's Ghana and Nigeria) Zonophone was used as a label to record and produce Sakara, Jùjú and Apala music on 78 rpm discs from 1928 to the early 1950s.

== See also ==
- List of record labels
