= Riot City Records =

Punk music label

- Parent company: Heartbeat Productions
- Founded: 1980
- Founder: Simon Edwards, Dave Bateman and Shane Baldwin
- Defunct: 1988
- Distributor: The Cartel
- Genre: Punk; Hardcore
- Country of origin: United Kingdom
- Location: Bristol
- Official website: Riot City Records at Heartbeat Productions

Riot City was a British record label based in Bristol, active between 1980 and 1988, and run by Heartbeat Records boss Simon Edwards along with Dave Bateman and Shane Baldwin from the band Vice Squad. Vice Squad's Last Rockers EP was Riot City's first release – it reached number 1 in the UK Alternative Chart and sold 22,000 copies.

The label released dozens of singles, albums, and EPs by bands including Chaotic Dischord, The Ejected, Chaos UK, and Abrasive Wheels, selling over 200,000 records in total.

In 1982 an American punk compilation album "Hell comes to your House" (Reagan 1) was licensed from Bemisbrain Records USA, and issued on the subsidiary Riot State Records label. In 1985 Chaotic Dischord released the spoof NOW! album, "NOW! That’s What I Call A Fuckin' Racket (Vol 1)" (GRR 1) on another subsidiary, Not Very Nice Records.

Riot City received its share of criticism, with journalist Garry Bushell describing the label as "the dustbin of punk", and members of Crass accusing the label of being the "back door to EMI" (Vice Squad had gone on to sign with EMI).

Riot City folded in the late-1980s and label boss Edwards continued with his job as a route planner with the AA. In 1994 he returned to the music industry as head of Trash City Records.

== Discography ==
=== Albums ===
- ASSEMBLY 1 V/A – Riotous Assembly LP (10,000 copies, red vinyl)
- CITY 001 Abrasive Wheels – When The Punks Go Marching In LP
- CITY 002 Chaos UK – Chaos UK LP
- CITY 003 The Ejected – A Touch Of Class LP
- CITY 004 Chaotic Dischord – Fuck Religion, Fuck Politics, Fuck The Lot Of You! LP
- CITY 005 Varukers – Bloodsuckers LP
- CITY 006 Undead – The Killing Of Reality LP
- CITY 007 The Ejected – Spirit Of Rebellion LP
- CITY 008 Chaotic Dischord – Live in New York LP

=== Singles ===
- RIOT 1 Vice Squad – Last Rockers / Living On Dreams / Latex Love 7"
- RIOT 2 Vice Squad – Resurrection EP 7"
- RIOT 3 The Insane – Politics / Dead And Gone / Last Day 7"
- RIOT 4 Abrasive Wheels – Vicious Circle / Attack / Voice Of Youth 7"
- RIOT 5 Court Martial – Gotta Get Out / Fight For Your Life / Young Offender 7"
- RIOT 6 Chaos UK – Burning Britain EP 7" (4 track EP)
- RIOT 7 Undead – It's Corruption / Undead 7"
- RIOT 8 Expelled – No Life, No Future / What Justice / Dreaming 7"
- RIOT 9 Abrasive Wheels – The Army Song / Juvenile / So Slow 7" (Red vinyl)
- RIOT 10 Chaotic Dischord – Fuck The World / You're Gonna Die / Sold Out To The GPO 7"
- RIOT 11 Court Martial – No Solution / Too Late / Take Control 7"
- RIOT 12 Chaos UK – Loud Political And Uncompromising EP 7" (3 track EP)
- RIOT 13 Mayhem – Gentle Murder EP 7" 4 track EP
- RIOT 14 The Ejected – Have You Got 10p? / Class Of 82 / One Of The Boys 7"
- RIOT 15 Undead – Violent Visions 7"
- RIOT 16 Abrasive Wheels – Burn 'Em Down / Urban Rebels 7"
- RIOT 17 Expelled – Government Policy / Make It Alone 7"
- RIOT 18 Resistance 77 – Nowhere To Play EP 7" (4 track EP)
- RIOT 19 The Ejected – Noise For The Boys! EP 7" (3 track EP)
- RIOT 20 No Choice – Sadist Dream / Cream Of The Crop / Nuclear Disaster 7"
- RIOT 21 Emergency – Points Of View / City Fun / Does Anybody Realise? 7"
- RIOT 22 Chaotic Dischord – Never Trust A Friend / Are Students Safe? / Popstars 7"
- RIOT 23 Sex Aids – Back On The Piss Again / The Amazing Mr Michael Hogarth / We Are The Road Crew 7"
- RIOT 24 Mayhem – Pulling Puppet Strings EP 7" (3 track EP)
- RIOT 25 Ultra Violent – Crime For Revenge / Where Angels Dare Not Tread / Dead Generation 7"
- RIOT 26 Underdogs – East Of Dachau / Johnny Go Home / Dead Soldier 7"
- RIOT 27 Varukers – Die For Your Government / All Systems Fail 7"
- RIOT 28 The Ejected – Press The Button EP 7" (3 track EP)
- RIOT 29 Varukers – Led To The Slaughter / The End Is Nigh / You're Dead 7"
- 12 RIOT 1/2 Vice Squad – Special Edition Tour EP 12" (6 track EP)
- 12 RIOT 30 Chaotic Dischord – Don't Throw It All Away 12" (8 track mini-LP)
- 12 RIOT 31 Varukers – Another Religion Another War 12" (8 track mini-lp)
- 12 RIOT 32 Chaos UK – The Singles 12" (8 track mini-lp)

== See also ==
- List of record labels
- List of bands from Bristol
- List of record labels from Bristol
- the Cartel
- Heartbeat Productions
