= Die Toten Hosen discography =

- Studio albums: 18
- Extended plays: 3
- Live albums: 8
- Compilation albums: 4
- Singles: 57
- Video albums: 12
- Music videos: 46

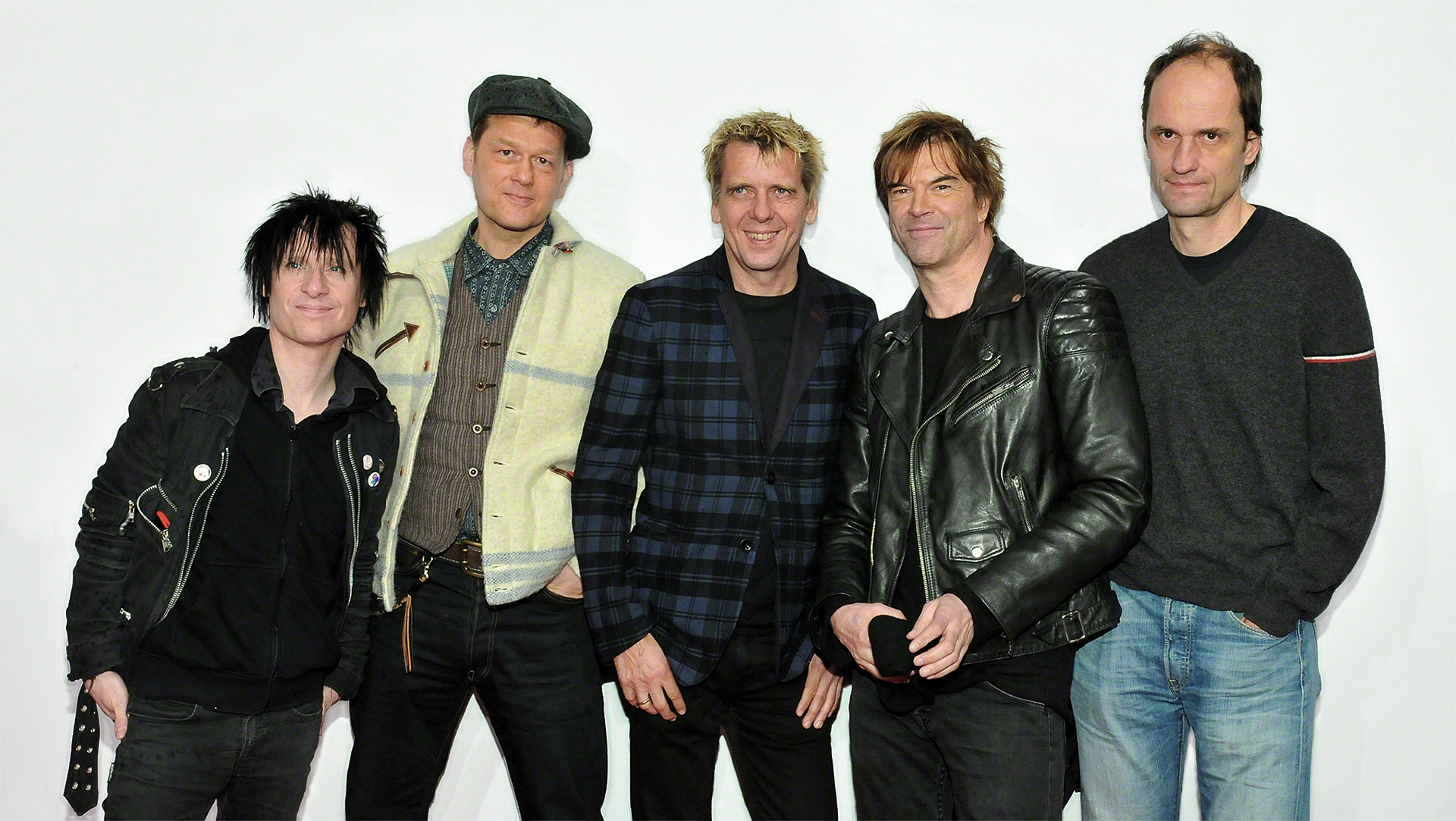
The band in 2013

The discography of Die Toten Hosen, a German punk band, consists of eighteen studio albums, eight live albums, three compilation albums, four non-German albums and fifty-seven singles.

Since forming in 1982, Die Toten Hosen have become the most successful German punk band.

The band released their debut album, Opel-Gang, in 1983. While the album did not manage to break the charts, in 2006, it was certified Gold in Germany. One single, Reisefieber, was released to promote the album.

In 2008, Die Toten Hosen released their latest album In aller Stille. Debuting at number one on the German charts, it has sold over 300,000 copies and has been certified 3× Gold. Four singles were released from the album, "Strom", "Alles was war", "Auflösen" and "Ertrinken", all of which charted heavily in Germany.

== Albums ==
=== Studio albums ===
| Year | Album details | Peak chart positions | | | Certifications |
| Year | Album details | GER | AUT | SWI | Certifications |
|---|---|---|---|---|---|
| 1983 | Opel-Gang: Released: 1983; Label: Formats: CD, digital download | 3 | — | 28 | BVMI: Gold |
| 1984 | Unter falscher Flagge: Released: 1984; Label: Formats: CD | 2 | 67 | 20 | BVMI: Gold |
| 1986 | Damenwahl: Released: Label: Formats: | 2 | — | 20 | BVMI: Gold |
| 1987 | Never Mind the Hosen, Here's Die Roten Rosen: Released: Label: Formats: | 21 | — | — | BVMI: Gold |
| 1988 | Ein kleines bisschen Horrorschau: Released: Label: Formats: CD | 3 | 22 | 7 | BVMI: 3× Gold |
| 1990 | Auf dem Kreuzzug ins Glück: Released: 1990; Label: Formats: CD | 1 | 16 | 6 | BVMI: Platinum |
| 1991 | Learning English, Lesson One: Released: 1991; Label: Formats: CD | 3 | 38 | 23 | BVMI: Gold |
| 1993 | Kauf MICH!: Released: 1993; Label: Formats: | 1 | 9 | 5 | BVMI: 3× Gold; IFPI SWI: Gold |
| 1996 | Opium fürs Volk: Released: 1996; Label: Formats: CD | 1 | 3 | 2 | BVMI: 2× Platinum; IFPI SWI: Gold |
| 1998 | Wir warten auf's Christkind...: Released: 1998; Label: Formats: | 4 | 2 | 25 | BVMI: Gold |
| 1999 | Unsterblich: Released: 1999; Label: Formats: | 1 | 6 | 9 | BVMI: 2× Platinum; IFPI SWI: Gold |
| 2002 | Auswärtsspiel: Released: 2002; Label: Formats: | 1 | 1 | 3 | BVMI: 3× Gold; IFPI SWI: Gold |
| 2004 | Zurück zum Glück: Released: 2004; Label: Formats: | 1 | 2 | 3 | BVMI: 3× Gold |
| 2008 | In aller Stille: Released: Label: Formats: CD | 1 | 2 | 3 | BVMI: 3× Gold; IFPI SWI: Gold |
| 2012 | Ballast der Republik: Released: 2012; Label: Formats: CD | 1 | 1 | 1 | BVMI: 9× Gold; IFPI SWI: Platinum |
| 2017 | Laune der Natur: Released: 2017; Label: Formats: CD | 1 | 1 | 1 | BVMI: 2× Platinum; IFPI SWI: Gold |
| 2020 | Learning English Lesson Three: Mersey Beat!: Released: 13 November 2020; Label: Formats: CD | 2 | 7 | 3 | |

=== Non-German albums ===
| Year | Name | Peak |
| Year | Name | GER |
|---|---|---|
| 1994 | Love, Peace & Money | 25 |
| 1999 | Crash-Landing | — |
| 2009 | La hermandad – en el principio fue el ruido | — |
| 2010 | Najwieksze Przeboje | — |

=== Live albums ===
| Year | Name | Peak chart positions | | | Certification (DE) |
| Year | Name | GER | AUT | SWI | Certification (DE) |
|---|---|---|---|---|---|
| 1987 | Bis zum bitteren Ende | 2 | 17 | 42 | Platinum |
| 1996 | Im Auftrag des Herrn | 2 | 3 | 2 | 3× Gold |
| 2005 | Nur zu Besuch: Unplugged | 5 | 6 | 7 | 2× Platinum |
| 2009 | Machmalauter | 3 | 19 | 33 | Gold |
| 2013 | Der Krach der Republik | 1 | 8 | 7 | Platinum |
| 2015 | Entartete Musik – Willkommen in Deutschland | 2 | 7 | 7 | n/a |
| 2019 | Zuhause Live – Das Laune der Natour-Finale | 3 | 3 | 5 | n/a |
| 2019 | Alles ohne Strom | 1 | 1 | 1 | n/a |
| 2024 | Fiesta y Ruido: Die Toten Hosen Live in Argentinien | 2 | 9 | 6 | n/a |

=== Compilation albums ===
| Year | Name | Peak chart positions | | | Certification (DE) |
| Year | Name | GER | AUT | SWI | Certification (DE) |
|---|---|---|---|---|---|
| 1993 | Reich & Sexy | 8 | 12 | 5 | 2× Platinum |
| 2002 | Reich & Sexy II: Die fetten Jahre | 2 | 8 | 9 | 2× Platinum |
| 2011 | All die ganzen Jahre: Ihre besten Lieder | 12 | 22 | 2 | Gold |
| 2022 | Alles aus Liebe: 40 Jahre Die Toten Hosen | 1 | 4 | 1 | |

=== Video albums ===
| Year | Title | Peak chart positions | | Certification (DE) |
| Year | Title | GER | SWI | Certification (DE) |
|---|---|---|---|---|
| 2001 | En misión del Señor | — | — | Platinum |
| 2002 | Reich & Sexy II: Die fetten Jahre | — | — | Platinum |
| 2003 | Im Auftrag des Herrn/Wir warten auf's Christkind | 43 | — | 2× Gold |
| 2004 | Rock am Ring Live | 13 | 60 | 3× Gold |
| 2005 | Heimspiel! Die Toten Hosen Live in Düsseldorf | 23 | 80 | 3× Gold |
| 2005 | Nur zu Besuch: Unplugged | — | — | 2× Platinum |
| 2006 | 3 Akkorde für ein Halleluja | 46 | — | Gold |
| 2008 | Hals + Beinbruch – Live bei Rock am Ring 2008 | — | — | Gold |
| 2009 | Machmalauter: Die Toten Hosen Live | — | — | Gold |
| 2009 | Die Toten Hosen: Auf die harte Tour | — | — | |
| 2012 | Noches como éstas: Live in Buenos Aires | 16 | — | Gold |
| 2014 | Der Krach der Republik – Das Tourfinale | — | — | |

== Singles ==
| Year | Name | Peak chart positions | | | Album |
| Year | Name | GER | AUT | SWI | Album |
|---|---|---|---|---|---|
| 1982 | "Wir sind bereit" | - | - | - | |
| 1982 | "Reisefieber" | - | - | - | Opel-Gang |
| 1983 | "Bommerlunder" | - | - | - | |
| 1983 | "Hip Hop Bommi Bop" | - | - | - | |
| 1983 | "Schöne Bescherung" | - | - | - | |
| 1984 | "Kriminaltango" | - | - | - | |
| 1984 | "Liebesspieler" | - | - | - | Unter falscher Flagge |
| 1985 | "Faust in der Tasche" | - | - | - | |
| 1986 | "Das Altbierlied" | - | - | - | Damenwahl |
| 1987 | "Im Wagen vor mir" | - | - | - | Never Mind the Hosen, Here's Die Roten Rosen |
| 1987 | "Alle Mädchen wollen küssen" | - | - | - | Never Mind the Hosen, Here's Die Roten Rosen |
| 1988 | "Hier kommt Alex" | 32 | - | - | Ein kleines bisschen Horrorschau |
| 1989 | "1000 gute Gründe" | - | - | - | Ein kleines bisschen Horrorschau |
| 1990 | "Alles wird gut" | 15 | - | - | Auf dem Kreuzzug ins Glück |
| 1990 | "Azzurro" | 23 | - | 17 | Auf dem Kreuzzug ins Glück |
| 1990 | "All die ganzen Jahre" | - | - | - | Auf dem Kreuzzug ins Glück |
| 1991 | "Carnival in Rio (Punk Was)" | 36 | - | - | Learning English, Lesson One |
| 1991 | "Baby Baby" | - | - | - | Learning English, Lesson One |
| 1992 | "Whole Wide World" | - | - | - | Learning English, Lesson One |
| 1992 | "If the Kids Are United" | - | - | - | Learning English, Lesson One |
| 1992 | "Sascha …ein aufrechter Deutscher" | 4 | 23 | 14 | Kauf MICH! |
| 1993 | "Wünsch DIR was" | 28 | - | 26 | Kauf MICH! |
| 1993 | "Alles aus Liebe" | 29 | - | 37 | Kauf MICH! |
| 1994 | "Kauf MICH!" | 34 | - | - | Kauf MICH! |
| 1994 | "Sexual" | - | - | - | Love, Peace & Money |
| 1995 | "Nichts bleibt für die Ewigkeit" | 24 | 27 | 22 | Opium fürs Volk |
| 1996 | "Paradies" | 45 | - | - | Opium fürs Volk |
| 1996 | "Bonnie & Clyde" | 33 | - | - | Opium fürs Volk |
| 1996 | "Zehn kleine Jägermeister" | 1 | 1 | 1 | Opium fürs Volk |
| 1997 | "Alles aus Liebe – Live" | 20 | 19 | - | Im Auftrag des Herrn |
| 1998 | "Pushed Again" | 4 | 20 | 10 | Crash-Landing |
| 1998 | "Soul Therapy" | - | - | - | Crash-Landing |
| 1998 | "Weihnachtsmann vom Dach" | - | - | - | Wir warten auf’s Christkind |
| 1999 | "Auld Lang Syne" | 29 | - | - | Wir warten auf’s Christkind |
| 1999 | "Schön sein" | 9 | - | 23 | Unsterblich |
| 2000 | "Unsterblich" | 31 | - | 80 | Unsterblich |
| 2000 | "Bayern" | 8 | - | 18 | Unsterblich |
| 2000 | "Warum werde ich nicht satt?" | 38 | - | - | Unsterblich |
| 2001 | "Was zählt" | 16 | 54 | 46 | Auswärtsspiel |
| 2002 | "Kein Alkohol (ist auch keine Lösung)" | 32 | - | - | Auswärtsspiel |
| 2002 | "Steh auf, wenn du am Boden bist" | 27 | - | - | Auswärtsspiel |
| 2002 | "Nur zu Besuch" | 17 | 50 | - | Auswärtsspiel |
| 2002 | "Frauen dieser Welt" | 23 | 74 | 95 | |
| 2004 | "Friss oder stirb" | 6 | 15 | 11 | |
| 2004 | "Ich bin die Sehnsucht in dir" | 5 | 22 | 10 | Zurück zum Glück |
| 2004 | "Walkampf" | 24 | 55 | 46 | Zurück zum Glück |
| 2005 | "Alles wird vorübergehen" | 34 | 65 | - | Zurück zum Glück |
| 2005 | "Freunde" | 33 | - | 42 | Zurück zum Glück |
| 2005 | "Hier kommt Alex (unplugged)" | 46 | 57 | 53 | Nur zu Besuch: Unplugged |
| 2006 | "The Guns of Brixton (unplugged)" | 62 | - | - | Nur zu Besuch: Unplugged |
| 2008 | "Strom" | 8 | 20 | 28 | In aller Stille |
| 2009 | "Alles was war" | 9 | 60 | - | In aller Stille |
| 2009 | "Auflösen" | 38 | 36 | - | In aller Stille |
| 2009 | "Ertrinken" | 32 | 68 | - | In aller Stille |
| 2009 | "Pushed Again (Live)" | 91 | - | - | |
| 2010 | "Der letzte Kuss (Live)" | 39 | - | - | |
| 2012 | "Tage wie diese" | 1 | 5 | 4 | Ballast der Republik |
| 2012 | "Altes Fieber" | 3 | 7 | 17 | Ballast der Republik |
| 2013 | "Draußen vor der Tür" | 20 | 36 | 29 | Ballast der Republik |
| 2013 | "Das ist der Moment" | 13 | 41 | 31 | Ballast der Republik |
| 2017 | "Unter den Wolken" | 2 | 15 | 7 | Laune der Natur |
| 2017 | "Gegenwind der Zeit" | - | - | 47 | Laune der Natur |
| 2017 | "Totes Meer" | - | - | 51 | Laune der Natur |
| 2017 | "Wannsee" | 28 | - | 84 | Laune der Natur |
| 2017 | "Alles passiert" | 32 | 39 | - | Laune der Natur |
| 2018 | "Laune der Natur" | 35 | - | - | Laune der Natur |
| 2019 | "Feiern im Regen" | 15 | - | - | Alles ohne Strom |
| 2020 | "Kamikaze" | 16 | - | - | Alles ohne Strom |
| 2022 | "Scheiß Wessis" | 6 | - | - | Non-album single |
