= Musik war ihr Hobby =

Box set by Die Toten Hosen
- Released: 21 July 1995
- Recorded: 1982–1984
- Genre: Punk rock
- Label: Virgin Records

Die Toten Hosen chronology
Love, Peace & Money (1994)	Musik war ihr Hobby (1995)	Opium fürs Volk (1996)

Musik war ihr Hobby (Music was their hobby; in a reference to the German title of Murder, she wrote [Mord ist ihr Hobby - Murder is her hobby]), subtitled Die frühen Singles (The early singles) is a single box by the German punk band Die Toten Hosen. It contains the early singles from 1982-1984.

== Track listing ==
=== Wir sind bereit (1982) ===
1. "Wir sind bereit" (We are ready) (Frege, von Holst/Frege) − 2:01
2. "Jürgen Englers Party" (Frege, von Holst/Frege) − 1:26

=== Reisefieber (1982) ===
1. "Reisefieber" (Travel nerves, lit. Travel fever) (Breitkopf, Frege, von Holst, Meurer, Trimpop/Frege) − 3:46
2. "Niemandsland" (No man's land) (Frege, von Holst/Frege) − 2:41

=== Armee der Verlierer (1983) ===
1. "Armee der Verlierer" (Army of losers) (Frege, von Holst/Frege) − 4:23
2. "Eisgekühlter Bommerlunder" (Ice-cold Bommerlunder) (Molinare, Dt.Spez.; Trimpop/Trimpop) − 2:58
3. "Opel-Gang" (von Holst, Frege/Breitkopf, Frege, von Holst, Meurer, Trimpop) − 1:59

=== Hip Hop Bommi Bop (1983) ===
1. "Hip Hop Bommi Bop" (Breitkopf, Frege, v. Holst, Meurer, Trimpop/Meurer, Trimpop) − 4:25
2. "Hip Hop Bommi Bop Bop" − 6:47 (with Fab Five Freddy)

=== Schöne Bescherung (1983) ===
1. "Schöne Bescherung" (roughly Happy holidays; lit. Nice gift-giving, also Nice mess) (Breitkopf, Frege, von Holst, Meurer, Trimpop/Frege) − 3:02
2. "Willi's weiße Weihnacht" (Willi's white christmas) (Breitkopf, Frege, von Holst, Meurer, Trimpop/Frege) − 2:35
3. "Knecht Ruprechts letzte Fahrt" (Knecht Ruprecht's last ride) (Breitkopf, Frege, von Holst, Meurer, Trimpop/Frege) − 3:46

=== Kriminaltango (1984) ===
1. "Kriminaltango" (Criminal tango) (Trombetto/Feltz) − 3:32
2. "Allein vor deinem Haus" (Alone in front of your house) (von Holst, Frege/Frege, Meurer, Trimpop) − 2:26
3. "Es ist vorbei...." (It's over) (Frege, von Holst/Frege, Meurer, Trimpop) − 3:09

=== Liebesspieler (1984) ===
1. "Liebesspieler" (Love player) (von Holst, Breitkopf, Frege/Frege) − 2:50
  Die John Peel Session:
2. "Spiel mir das Lied vom Tod" (Play me the song of death; German title for Once Upon a Time in the West) (Ennio Morricone) − 1:14
3. "Es ist vorbei" − 2:27
4. "Till to the Bitter End" (Frege/Frege) − 2:48 (English version of "Bis zum bitteren Ende")
5. "Seafever" (Breitkopf, Frege, von Holst, Meurer, Trimpop/Frege) − 3:38 (English version of "Reisefieber")
6. "Hofgarten" (Court garden) (Breitkopf, von Holst, Meurer/von Holst) − 1:41

== Personnel ==
- Campino - vocals
- Andreas von Holst - guitar
- Michael Breitkopf - guitar
- Andreas Meurer - bass
- Trini Trimpop - drums
