= Bis zum bitteren Ende – Die Toten Hosen Live! =

Bis zum bitteren Ende - Die Toten Hosen Live!

Live album by Die Toten Hosen
- Released: 1987; 2007 (jubilee edition)
- Recorded: 1987
- Genre: Punk rock
- Length: 47:48; 73:00 (re-release)
- Label: Virgin Records
- Producer: Jon Caffery

Die Toten Hosen chronology
Never Mind the Hosen, Here's Die Roten Rosen (1987)	Bis zum bitteren Ende - Die Toten Hosen Live! (1987)	Ein kleines bisschen Horrorschau (1988)

Bis zum bitteren Ende – Die Toten Hosen Live! or just Bis zum bitteren Ende (Until the Bitter End) is the first live album of the German punk band Die Toten Hosen. It contains songs from the "Ein bunter Abend für eine schwarze Republik" (A colourful evening for a black republic) tour. Because of an injury Jakob Keusen replaces Wolfgang Rohde on drums on some tracks.

== Track listing ==
1. "Rock 'n' Roll" (Leander/Glitter) − 4:00 (Gary Glitter cover)
2. "Liebesspieler" (Love Player) (Breitkopf, Frege, von Holst/Frege) − 2:40 (from Unter falscher Flagge)
3. "Warten auf dich" (Waiting for you) (Trimpop, Frege, von Holst, Breitkopf/Frege) − 3:15 (from Unter falscher Flagge)
4. "Armee der Verlierer" (Army of losers) (Frege, von Holst/Frege) − 2:40 (from "Bommerlunder/Opel Gang")
5. "Liebeslied" (Love song) (Breitkopf/Frege) − 3:50 (from "Hier kommt Alex" [released a year later])
6. "Disco in Moskau" (Disco in Moscow) (Phil Ram/Ram/Translation: Frege) − 3:05 (from Damenwahl; The Vibrators cover, in German)
7. "Das Wort zum Sonntag" (The word to Sunday) (von Holst/Frege) − 4:20 (from Damenwahl)
8. "Police on My Back" (Eddy Grant/Grant) − 2:08 (The Equals cover)
9. "Schwarzwaldklinik" (Black Forest Clinic) (Breitkopf/Frege) − 3:08 (from Damenwahl)
10. "Opel-Gang" (von Holst, Frege/Breitkopf, Frege, von Holst, Meurer, Trimpop) − 1:51 (from Opel-Gang)
11. "Die Rosen geben 'ne Party" (Die Rosen/The Roses are throwing a party) (Frege, von Holst/Frege) − 1:25 ("Jürgen Englers Party" from "Wir sind bereit")
12. "Bis zum bitteren Ende" (Till to the bitter end) (Frege/Frege) − 3:40 (from Opel-Gang)
13. "Happy Metal Part I (Adagio)" (Breitkopf, von Holst) − 1:16
14. "Freitag der 13." (Friday the 13th) (Rohde/Frege) − 3:25 (from Damenwahl)
15. "Happy Metal Part II (Allegro)" (Breitkopf, von Holst) − 0:40
16. "Betrunken im Dienst" (Drunk on duty) (Trimpop, Frege, von Holst, Breitkopf, Meurer/Trimpop, Frege, Meurer) − 2:10 (from Unter falscher Flagge)
17. "Happy Metal Part III (Forte fortissimo)" (Breitkopf, von Holst) − 0:40
18. "Eisgekühlter Bommerlunder" (Ice-cold Bommerlunder) (Molinare, Dt.Spez.; Trimpop/Trimpop) − 3:35 (from "Bommerlunder/Opel Gang")
- Tracks 13–17 are actually one track on the original release.

=== 2007 remastered anniversary edition bonus tracks ===
19. "Blitzkrieg Bop" (Dee Dee Ramone, Tommy Ramone) – 2:18 (live in Edinburgh 1992; from Learning English, Lesson One; Ramones cover)
20. "Opel-Gang" – 1:27 (live in Edinburgh 1992; from Opel-Gang)
21. "Musterbeispiel" (Prime example) (von Holst/Frege) – 2:56 (live in Edinburgh 1992; from Ein kleines bisschen Horrorschau)
22. "Whole Wide World" (Eric Goulden) – 3:16 (live in Edinburgh 1992; from Learning English, Lesson One; Wreckless Eric cover)
23. "Liebeslied" – 3:43 (live in Edinburgh 1992; from "Hier kommt Alex")
24. "Do Anything You Wanna Do" – 3:36 (live in Edinburgh 1992; from Learning English, Lesson One; Eddie and the Hot Rods cover)
25. "Carnival in Rio (Punk Was)" (Frege, von Holst/Ronnie Biggs) – 3:06 (live in Edinburgh 1992; from Learning English, Lesson One)
26. "All die ganzen Jahre" (All these [whole] years) (Frege/Frege) – 3:58 (live in Edinburgh 1992; from 125 Jahre die Toten Hosen: Auf dem Kreuzzug ins Glück)

== Personnel ==
- Campino - vocals
- Andreas von Holst - guitar
- Michael Breitkopf - guitar
- Andreas Meurer - bass
- Wolfgang Rohde - drums
- Jakob Keusen - drums

== Charts ==
1988 chart performance for Bis zum bitteren Ende – Die Toten Hosen Live!
Chart (1988)	Peak position
Austrian Albums (Ö3 Austria)	17
German Albums (Offizielle Top 100)	23

2022 chart performance for Bis zum bitteren Ende – Die Toten Hosen Live!
Chart (2022)	Peak position
German Albums (Offizielle Top 100)	2
Swiss Albums (Schweizer Hitparade)	42

== Certifications ==
Region	Certification	Certified units/sales
Germany (BVMI)	Platinum	500,000^{^}
^{^} Shipments figures based on certification alone.
