= Reich & sexy =

Greatest hits album by Die Toten Hosen
- Released: 1993; 2007 (jubilee edition)
- Recorded: 1982–1993
- Genre: Punk rock
- Length: 67:59; 72:14 (re-release)
- Label: ToT; Virgin Records
- Producer: Jon Caffery & Die Toten Hosen

Die Toten Hosen chronology
Kauf MICH! (1993)	Reich & sexy (1993)	Put Your Money Where Your Mouth Is (1994)

Reich & sexy (Rich & sexy) (subtitled: Ihre 20!! grössten Erfolge [Their 20!! biggest hits]) is the first greatest hits compilation by the German punk band Die Toten Hosen. The album is an apparent tribute to Johnny Thunders, as both "Wort zum Sonntag" (a tribute to punk and Johnny) and "Born to Lose" (a Heartbreakers cover recorded with Johnny) are included on this album, moreover, these songs come consecutively.

The album is notable for its cover, where the band members are standing/laying naked among naked women. Some DTH albums (Opel-Gang, Kauf MICH!, Bis zum bitteren Ende) are in a couple of women's hands.

The second DTH best-of album shares its title with this album (Reich & sexy II: Die fetten Jahre).

== Track listing ==
1. "Hier kommt Alex" (Here comes Alex) (Meurer/Frege) − 4:30 (from Ein kleines bisschen Horrorschau)
2. "Alles wird gut" (All will be well) (v. Holst/Frege) − 3:37 (from Auf dem Kreuzzug ins Glück)
3. "Alles aus Liebe" (All because of love) (Frege/Frege) − 4:32 (from Kauf MICH!)
4. "Azzuro" (Azure) (Paolo Conte, Michele Virano/Conte, Vito Pallavicini) − 2:34 (from Auf dem Kreuzzug ins Glück)
5. "Halbstark" (Half-strong) − 2:33 (from Never Mind the Hosen, Here's Die Roten Rosen; Jankees cover)
6. "Wünsch DIR was" (roughly Make a wish) (Meurer/Frege) − 4:15 (from Kauf MICH!)
7. "Carnival in Rio (Punk Was)" (Frege, von Holst/Ronnie Biggs) − 3:07 (from Learning English, Lesson One)
8. "Mehr davon" (More of it) (von Holst/Frege) − 5:09 (from Ein kleines bisschen Horrorschau)
9. "Liebesspieler" (Love Player) (von Holst, Breitkopf, Frege/Frege) − 2:47 (from Unter falscher Flagge)
10. "Wort zum Sonntag" (Word to Sunday) (von Holst/Frege) − 4:18 (from Damenwahl)
11. "Born to Lose" − 3:21 (from Learning English, Lesson One; The Heartbreakers cover)
12. "Sascha ...ein aufrechter Deutscher" (Sascha ...an upstanding German) (Frege, Müller/Frege, Müller) − 2:34 (from Kauf MICH!)
13. "1000 gute Gründe" (1000 good reasons) (Breitkopf/Frege) − 3:23 (from Ein kleines bisschen Horrorschau)
14. "All die ganzen Jahre" (All the whole years) (Frege/Frege) − 3:20 (from Auf dem Kreuzzug ins Glück)
15. "Liebeslied" (Love song) (Breitkopf/Frege) − 3:41 (from "Hier kommt Alex")
16. "Opel-Gang" (von Holst, Frege/Breitkopf, Frege, von Holst, Meurer, Trimpop) − 1:55 (from Opel-Gang)
17. "Wir sind bereit" (We are ready) (Frege, von Holst/Frege) − 2:01 (from "Wir sind bereit")
18. "Eisgekühlter Bommerlunder" (Ice-cold Bommerlunder) (Molinare, Dt.Spez.; Trimpop/Trimpop) − 2:58 (from the "Bommerlunder/Opel Gang" Single)
19. "Hip Hop Bommi Bop" (Breitkopf, Frege, v. Holst, Meurer, Trimpop/Meurer, Trimpop) − 4:15 (from Auf dem Kreuzzug ins Glück)
20. "Bis zum bitteren Ende" (Till to the bitter end) (Frege/Frege) − 3:09 (from Bis zum bitteren Ende)

=== 2007 remastered anniversary edition bonus track ===
21. "Die Büttenrede" (Carnival speech) – 4:04 (from the promo single of "Zehn kleine Jägermeister")

== Personnel ==
- Campino - vocals
- Andreas von Holst - guitar
- Michael Breitkopf - guitar
- Andreas Meurer - bass
- Trini Trimpop - drums
- Wolfgang Rohde - drums

== Charts ==
Chart (1993–94)	Position
Austrian Albums (Ö3 Austria)	12
German Albums (Offizielle Top 100)	8
Swiss Albums (Schweizer Hitparade)	5

== Certifications ==
Region	Certification	Certified units/sales
Austria (IFPI Austria)	Platinum	50,000^{*}
Germany (BVMI)	2× Platinum	1,000,000^{^}
Switzerland (IFPI Switzerland)	Platinum	50,000^{^}
^{*} Sales figures based on certification alone.^{^} Shipments figures based on certification alone.
