= Love, Peace & Money =

Love, Peace & Money 愛、平和、そして金

Studio album by Die Toten Hosen
- Released: 1994; 16 May 1994 (UK import); 20 June 1995 (US import); 2007 (jubilee edition)
- Genre: Punk rock, melodic hardcore
- Length: 58:39; 78:09 (re-release)
- Label: ToT; Virgin Records
- Producer: Jon Caffery & Die Toten Hosen

Die Toten Hosen chronology
Put Your Money Where Your Mouth Is (1994)	Love, Peace & Money 愛、平和、そして金 (1994)	Musik war ihr Hobby (1995)

Alternative covers
- UK import cover

Alternative cover
- USA import cover

Love, Peace & Money (also Love Peace & Money; Japanese 愛、平和、そして金) is the first English-language album by the German punk band Die Toten Hosen (ディ・トーテン・ホーゼン ["di tōten hōzen"] in katakana; DTH), not counting the cover album Learning English, Lesson One. It was intended for the Japanese market. Most of the songs are just English versions of other DTH songs.

For the cover, the idea of Reich & sexy was copied. However, the band was unable to find enough Japanese women willing to undress for the cover, so some of the women are just made to look Japanese.

The reason behind the album was that since the band was also famous outside German speaking countries, they wanted everybody to understand what they have to say. They were especially inspired by Argentinian fans, of whom some have started learning German just to understand DTH's lyrics.

== Track listing ==
1. アレックスの帰還 "The Return of Alex" (Meurer/Frege, Dangerfield) − 4:29 ("Hier kommt Alex")
2. 2000年 "Year 2000" (v. Holst/Frege, Dangerfield) − 3:36 ("Alles wird gut")
3. 全ては愛のため "All for the Sake of Love" (Frege/Frege, Honest John Plain) − 4:31 ("Alles aus Liebe")
4. ラブソング "Lovesong" (Breitkopf/Frege, Plain) − 3:41 ("Liebeslied")
5. 性 "Sexual" (Plain, v. Holst/Frege, Dangerfield) − 4:27
6. 恋人の日記 "Diary of a Lover" (Thunders/Thunders) − 4:03 (Johnny Thunders cover)
7. 口元にお金をおいて (私を買って!) "Put Your Money Where Your Mouth Is (Buy Me!)" (Breitkopf/Frege, Plain) − 3:29 ("Kauf MICH!")
8. 愛はここだ (愛を戯れる者) "Love Is Here" (Breitkopf, Frege, v. Holst/Frege, Plain) − 2:49 ("Liebesspieler")
9. もっと、もっと "More & More" (v. Holst/Frege, Dangerfield) − 5:14 ("Mehr davon")
10. 私の国 "My Land" (Breitkopf/Frege, Dangerfield) − 3:55 ("Willkommen in Deutschland")
11. 無駄な歳月 "Wasted Years" (Frege/Frege, Dangerfield) − 3:19 ("All die ganzen Jahre")
12. 完全犯罪者 "Perfect Criminal" (v. Holst/Frege, Dangerfield) − 3:57 ("Musterbeispiel")
13. ラブマシーン "Love Machine" (Plain, Meurer/Frege, Dangerfield) − 3:21
14. 無秩序な兄弟 "Chaos Bros." (v. Holst/Frege, Plain) − 4:28 ("Katastrophenkommando")
  - "Guantanamera" (Girl from Guantánamo [in Spanish]) (Joseíto Fernández) - 3:20 (hidden track)

- "Guantanamera" is a separate track on the re-release.

=== 2007 remastered anniversary edition bonus tracks ===
16. "In Control" (Breitkopf, von Holst/Frege, T. V. Smith) – 3:15 (from the soundtrack of Lara Croft: Tomb Raider)
17. "Stand Up" (v. Holst/Frege, Smith) – 3:52 ("Steh auf, wenn du am Boden bist"; from the soundtrack of Land of Plenty)
18. "Dog Eat Dog" (v. Holst/Frege, Smith) – 3:42 ("Friss oder stirb"; from the soundtrack of Land of Plenty)
19. "We Will Be Heroes" (Meurer, Frege/Frege, Dangerfield) – 3:41 ("Wir werden siegen"; from the Fifa World Cup 2002 compilation)
20. "Wasted Years" – 4:45 ("All die ganzen Jahre"; radio interview England 1994)

== Singles ==
1994: "The Return of Alex" (promo)
1994: "Sexual"

== Personnel ==
- Campino - vocals
- Andreas von Holst - guitar
- Michael Breitkopf - guitar
- Andreas Meurer - bass
- Wolfgang Rohde - drums

== Charts ==
Year	Country	Position
1994	Germany	25
