= Put Your Money Where Your Mouth Is (EP) =

EP by Die Toten Hosen
- Released: 1994
- Genre: Punk rock, melodic hardcore
- Length: 17:16

Die Toten Hosen chronology
Reich & sexy (1993)	Put Your Money Where Your Mouth Is (1994)	Love, Peace & Money (1994)

Put Your Money Where Your Mouth Is is an English-language EP by the German punk band Die Toten Hosen. It was released to promote the English language album Love, Peace & Money. "Put Your Money Where Your Mouth Is" is also the title of a song from Love, Peace & Money (English version of "Kauf MICH!").

== Track listing ==
1. "Lovesong" (Breitkopf/Frege, Plain) − 3:41 (English version of "Liebeslied")
2. "My Land" (Breitkopf/Frege, Dangerfield) − 3:55 ("Willkommen in Deutschland")
3. "Whole Wide World" (Wreckless Eric) − 3:19 (Wreckless Eric cover)
4. "Long Way from Liverpool" (Breitkopf, John Plain/Frege) - 3:01
5. "Guantanamera" (Joseíto Fernández) - 3:20

== Personnel ==
- Campino - vocals
- Andreas von Holst - guitar
- Michael Breitkopf - guitar
- Andreas Meurer - bass
- Wolfgang Rohde - drums
