= The Battle of the Bands =

EP by Die Toten Hosen
- Released: 1985
- Genre: Punk rock
- Length: 16:29

Die Toten Hosen chronology
Unter falscher Flagge (1984)	The Battle of the Bands (1985)	Damenwahl (1986)

The Battle of the Bands is an EP by the German punk band Die Toten Hosen. The songs are sung under different aliases, which makes it kind of a "battle of the bands".

The EP was re-released remastered as whole on the 2007 re-release of Unter falscher Flagge.

== Track listing ==
1. "Faust in der Tasche" (Fist in the pocket) (Frege, von Holst/Frege) – 3:55 (as Ricky Curl and the Standing Ovations)
2. "Head over Heels" (Trimpop/Frege) – 4:05 (as The Evil Kids)
3. "Schöne Bescherung" (roughly Happy holidays; lit. Nice gift-giving, also Nice mess) (Breitkopf, Frege, von Holst, Meurer, Trimpop/Frege) – 2:23 (as Die Flinger Domspatzen)
4. "La historia del pescador Pepe" (The story of Pepe the fisherman [in Spanish]) (Breitkopf, Frege, von Holst, Meurer, Trimpop/Frege) – 3:17 (as Little Pepito and the Swinging Pesetas)
5. "Vom Surfen und vom Saufen" (About surfing and about drinking) (Breitkopf/Frege) – 2:49 (as Die Pebbles)

== Singles ==
- 1985: "Faust in der Tasche"

== Personnel ==
- Campino - vocals
- Andreas von Holst - guitar
- Michael Breitkopf - guitar
- Andreas Meurer - bass
- Trini Trimpop - drums
