= Opel-Gang =

Studio album by Die Toten Hosen
- Released: 1983; 2007 (jubilee edition)
- Genre: Punk rock
- Length: 36:21; 79:43 (re-release)
- Label: Totenkopf; EMI
- Producer: Jon Caffery

Die Toten Hosen chronology
Opel-Gang (1983)	Unter falscher Flagge (1984)

Singles from Opel-Gang
- 1. "Reisefieber" Released: 1982

Opel-Gang is the debut album of the German punk band Die Toten Hosen. The title is a reference to an article in a Düsseldorf newspaper, where a gang of small-time thieves, who drove self-tuned Opels, were named Opel-Gang, even though the band wasn't initially into car modding. The album took under 10 days to record.

As the band is from Düsseldorf, several songs on this album are centered on this city. "Modestadt Düsseldorf" is a nod to their home town; the title and the theme, although not the exact lyrics of "Opel-Gang" are based on the article mentioned above; in "Hofgarten", the Düsseldorf court garden is meant.

"Reisefieber" was released as a single and a video was made for it. "Opel-Gang" and "Bis zum bitteren Ende" have become live favourites and defining songs for Die Toten Hosen; the band sometimes refers to itself as "the original Opel gang" and "bis zum bitteren Ende" has become somewhat a slogan for the band, also it was used as the title of their first live album.

== Track listing ==
1. "Tote Hose" (Nothing going on, lit. Dead trousers [in singular]) − 1:24
2. "Allein vor deinem Haus o. dein Vater der Boxer" (Alone in front of your house or your father the boxer) (von Holst, Frege/Frege, Meurer, Trimpop) − 2:18
3. "Modestadt Düsseldorf" (Fashion city Düsseldorf) (Die Toten Hosen/Frege) − 2:16
4. "Reisefieber" (Travel nerves, lit. Travel fever) (Breitkopf, Frege, von Holst, Meurer, Trimpop/Frege) − 3:46
5. "Kontakthof" (von Holst/Frege) − 2:38
6. "Opel-Gang" (von Holst, Frege/Breitkopf, Frege, von Holst, Meurer, Trimpop) − 1:47
7. "Willi muß ins Heim" (Willi has to go to an approved school) (von Holst/Trimpop, Frege, Meurer) − 2:17
8. "Wehende Fahnen" (roughly Waving flags [from to go down with flying colours]) (von Holst, Frege/Trimpop, Frege) − 3:08
9. "Schwarzer Mann" (Black man or Man in black) (Die Toten Hosen/Frege) − 2:20
10. "Geld" (Money) (Frege, von Holst/Meurer, Trimpop, Frege) − 2:13
11. "Ülüsü" (Meurer, von Holst, Frege/Frege) − 2:33
12. "Es ist nichts gewesen" (Nothing has happened) (von Holst/Frege) − 2:38
13. "Sommernachtstraum" (Summer night dream) (von Holst/Trimpop, Meurer, Frege) − 1:37
14. "Hofgarten" (Court garden) (von Holst, Meurer, Breitkopf/von Holst) − 3:07
15. "Bis zum bitteren Ende" (Until the bitter end) (Frege/Frege) − 2:19

=== 2007 remastered anniversary edition bonus tracks ===
16. "Jürgen Englers Party" (Frege, von Holst/Frege) – 1:26 (from "Wir sind bereit")
17. "Niemandsland" (No man's land) (Frege, von Holst/Frege) – 2:41 (from "Reisefieber")
18. "Armee der Verlierer" (Army of losers) (Frege, von Holst/Frege) – 4:23 (from "Bommerlunder/Opel Gang")
19. "Opel-Gang" – 1:59 (from "Bommerlunder/Opel Gang")
20. "Schöne Bescherung" (roughly Happy holidays; lit. Nice gift-giving, also Nice mess) (Breitkopf, Frege, von Holst, Meurer, Trimpop/Frege) – 3:02 (from "Schöne Bescherung")
21. "Willi's weiße Weihnacht" (Willi's white christmas) (Breitkopf, Frege, von Holst, Meurer, Trimpop/Frege) – 2:35 (from "Schöne Bescherung")
22. "Knecht Ruprechts letzte Fahrt" (Knecht Ruprecht's last ride) (Breitkopf, Frege, von Holst, Meurer, Trimpop/Frege) – 3:46 (from "Schöne Bescherung")
23. "Kriminaltango" (Criminal tango) (Trombetto/Feltz) – 3:32 (from "Kriminaltango")
24. "Allein vor deinem Haus o. dein Vater der Boxer" – 2:26 (from "Kriminaltango")
25. "Es ist vorbei" (It's over) (Frege, von Holst/Frege, Meurer, Trimpop) – 3:09 (from "Kriminaltango")
26. "Die Abenteuer des kleinen Haevelmann" (The adventures of the little Haevelmann) (von Holst/Frege) – 2:29 (as Tangobrüder, from the compilation Ein Vollrausch in Stereo - 20 schäumende Stimmungshits)
27. "Frühstückskorn" (Korn for breakfast) (von Holst/Frege) – 1:57 (as Tangobrüder, from the compilation Ein Vollrausch in Stereo)
28. "Bis zum bitteren Ende" – 3:08 (as Tangobrüder, from the compilation Ein Vollrausch in Stereo)
29. "Wir sind bereit" (We are ready) (Frege, von Holst/Frege) – 1:59 (live in „S0 36“ in Berlin, 30.04.1982)
30. "Hip Hop Bommi Bop" (Breitkopf, Frege, von Holst, Meurer, Trimpop/Meurer, Trimpop) – 4:34 (from "Hip Hop Bommi Bop")

== Personnel ==
- Campino - vocals
- Andreas von Holst - guitar
- Michael Breitkopf - guitar
- Andreas Meurer - bass
- Trini Trimpop - drums

== Charts ==
2023 chart performance for Opel-Gang
Chart (2023)	Peak position
German Albums (Offizielle Top 100)	3
Swiss Albums (Schweizer Hitparade)	28

== Certifications ==
During 2006, the album went gold in Germany.
