= Unter falscher Flagge =

Studio album by Die Toten Hosen
- Released: 1984
- Recorded: 1984
- Genre: Punk rock
- Length: 39:56; 79:24 (re-release)
- Label: Totenkopf; Virgin
- Producer: Jon Caffery

Die Toten Hosen chronology
Opel-Gang (1983)	Unter falscher Flagge (1984)	The Battle of the Bands (1985)

Singles from Unter falscher Flagge
- 1. "Liebesspieler" Released: 1984

Unter falscher Flagge (Under false colors or Under false flag) is the second album of the German punk band Die Toten Hosen.

== Track listing ==
1. "Spiel mir das Lied vom Tod" (Play me the song of death; German title for "Once Upon a Time in the West") (Ennio Morricone) − 2:19
2. "Liebesspieler" (Love Player) (von Holst, Breitkopf, Frege/Frege) − 2:50
3. "Letzte Wache" (Last watch) (von Holst, Breitkopf, Frege, Meurer/Frege) − 3:18
4. "Der Abt von Andex" (The abbot of Andex) (Trimpop, Frege, von Holst, Breitkopf/Frege, Meurer) − 3:12
5. "Der Mord an Vicky Morgan" (The murder of Vicky Morgan) (Trimpop, Frege, von Holst, Breitkopf, Meurer/Trimpop, Frege, Meurer) − 3:32
6. "Im Hafen ist Endstation" (In harbour is the end station) − 4:16
7. "Unter falscher Flagge" (Under the wrong flag) (Trimpop, Frege, von Holst, Breitkopf/Trimpop Frege, Meurer/Narrator: Hans Paetsch) − 4:12
8. "Sekt oder Selters" ([In] good or bad, lit. Champagne or soda) (Trimpop, Frege, von Holst, Breitkopf, Meurer/Frege) − 3:56
9. "Der Schandfleck" (Disgrace) (Frege, von Holst, Breitkopf/Frege) − 2:56
10. "Betrunken im Dienst" (Drunk on duty) (Trimpop, Frege, von Holst, Breitkopf, Meurer/Trimpop, Frege, Meurer) − 2:20
11. "Shake Hands" (Drafi Deutscher cover) − 2:13
12. "Warten auf dich" (Waiting for you) (Trimpop, Frege, von Holst, Breitkopf/Frege) − 3:40
13. "Im Hafen ist Endstation 2" − 1:12

=== 2007 remastered anniversary edition bonus tracks ===
14. "Spiel mir das Lied vom Tod" – 1:14 (from "Liebesspieler")
15. "Es ist vorbei" (It's over) (Frege, von Holst/Frege, Meurer, Trimpop) – 2:27 (from "Liebesspieler")
16. "Till to the Bitter End" (English version of "Bis zum bitteren Ende") (Frege/Frege) – 2:48 (from "Liebesspieler")
17. "Seafever" (English version of "Reisefieber") (Breitkopf, Frege, von Holst, Meurer, Trimpop/Frege) – 3:38 (from "Liebesspieler")
18. "Hofgarten" (Court garden) (Breitkopf, von Holst, Meurer/von Holst) – 1:41 (from "Liebesspieler")
19. "Hip Hop Bommi Bop" (Breitkopf, Frege, von Holst, Meurer, Trimpop/Meurer, Trimpop) – 4:26 (Unter falscher Flagge demo)
20. "Faust in der Tasche" (Fist in the pocket) (Frege, von Holst/Frege) – 3:55 (from The Battle of the Bands)
21. "Head over Heels" (Trimpop/Frege) – 4:05 (from The Battle of the Bands)
22. "La historia del pescador Pepe" (The story of Pepe the fisherman [in Spanish]) (Breitkopf, Frege, von Holst, Meurer, Trimpop/Frege) – 3:17 (from The Battle of the Bands)
23. "Schöne Bescherung" (roughly Happy holidays; lit. Nice gift-giving, also Nice mess) (Breitkopf, Frege, von Holst, Meurer, Trimpop/Frege) – 2:23 (from The Battle of the Bands)
24. "Vom Surfen und vom Saufen" (About surfing and about drinking) (Breitkopf/Frege) – 2:49 (from The Battle of the Bands)
25. "Der Schandfleck" – 2:43 (Unter falscher Flagge demo)
26. "Unter falscher Flagge" – 3:58 (Unter falscher Flagge demo)

== Personnel ==
- Campino – vocals
- Andreas von Holst – guitar
- Michael Breitkopf – guitar
- Andreas Meurer – bass guitar
- Trini Trimpop – drums

== Charts ==
2024 chart performance for Unter falscher Flagge
Chart (2024)	Peak position
Austrian Albums (Ö3 Austria)	67
German Albums (Offizielle Top 100)	2
Swiss Albums (Schweizer Hitparade)	20
