= Sobering Romance =

Poem by Erich Kästner

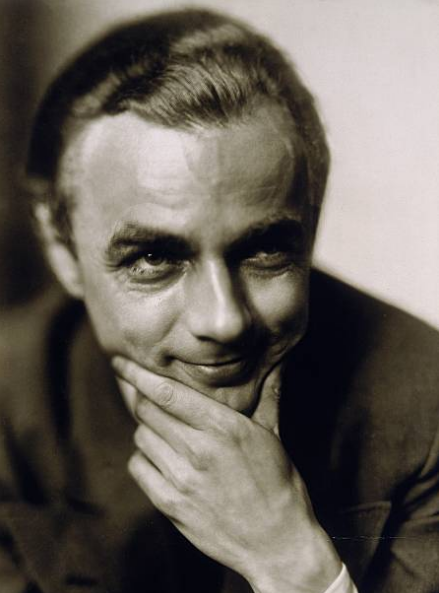
Erich Kästner portrayed by Grete Kolliner, around 1928

Sobering Romance (in German: Sachliche Romanze) is considered to be one of the best and beloved poems by Erich Kästner (1899–1974). It first was published in the Vossische Zeitung at Berlin on 20 April 1928, and was republished in Kästner's second volume of poetry Lärm im Spiegel (Noise in the mirror) a year later.

== Source text and its translation ==
Sachliche Romanze
Als sie einander acht Jahre kannten
(und man darf sagen: sie kannten sich gut),
kam ihre Liebe plötzlich abhanden.
Wie andern Leuten ein Stock oder Hut.

Sie waren traurig, betrugen sich heiter,
versuchten Küsse, als ob nichts sei,
und sahen sich an und wußten nicht weiter.
Da weinte sie schließlich. Und er stand dabei.

Vom Fenster aus konnte man Schiffen winken.
Er sagte, es wäre schon Viertel nach Vier
und Zeit, irgendwo Kaffee zu trinken.
Nebenan übte ein Mensch Klavier.

Sie gingen ins kleinste Cafe am Ort
und rührten in ihren Tassen.
Am Abend saßen sie immer noch dort.
Sie saßen allein, und sie sprachen kein Wort
und konnten es einfach nicht fassen.

Sobering Romance
When they had known each other for eight years
(and they knew each other well, you could say)
but their love suddenly disappeared.
Like other folks lose a stick or a beret.

Sorrowful they tried to kiss each other anew
as if nothing between them was wrong.
Changing glances but didn't know what to do.
Finally she cried. And he felt no belong.

Through the window they saw clouds in the air.
He said it is a quarter past four
and time to having a coffee somewhere.
Someone was training piano next door.

They went to the smallest café in town.
Instead drinking coffee, they only stirred.
And were still sitting there til evening.
They sat alone, and they didn't say a word
and they just couldn’t believe it.

Translated by Natias Neutert; published in Foolnotes

== Titling ==
The titling of Kästner's poem is pure irony by using an oxymoron. namely the contradiction between romanticism and soberness. The title fits the sad content of the poem. In addition the title is particularly ingenious: With the adjective „Sober“ it also indicates the stylistic affiliation to the Gebrauchslyrik (Lyrics for Everyday Use), which made Kästner one of the leading figure of the Neue Sachlichkeit movement, which focused on using a sobering style to satirise contemporary society.

== Subject ==
The poem is about an eight-year relationship that falls apart. What the former lovers did not want to admit.

== Versification ==
The poem has an iambic meter with predominantly masculine cadences. It consists of four stanzas with a total of 17 verses. The first three stanzas have four verses and the last stanza five. In terms of the rhyme scheme, the cross rhyme is used in all verses, „the fifth verse of the fourth stanza stands alone and therefore without a rhyme echo — signaling the coming loneliness of those two human beings.“ The end rhymes are, as always in Kästner's poetry, perfect. The only exception in the German original is the end of the line "kannten" in the first verse and the end of the line "abhanden" in the third verse: they are assonant and so-called slant rhymes. However, this did not detract from the rhythmic and melodic momentum in any way.

== Literary style ==
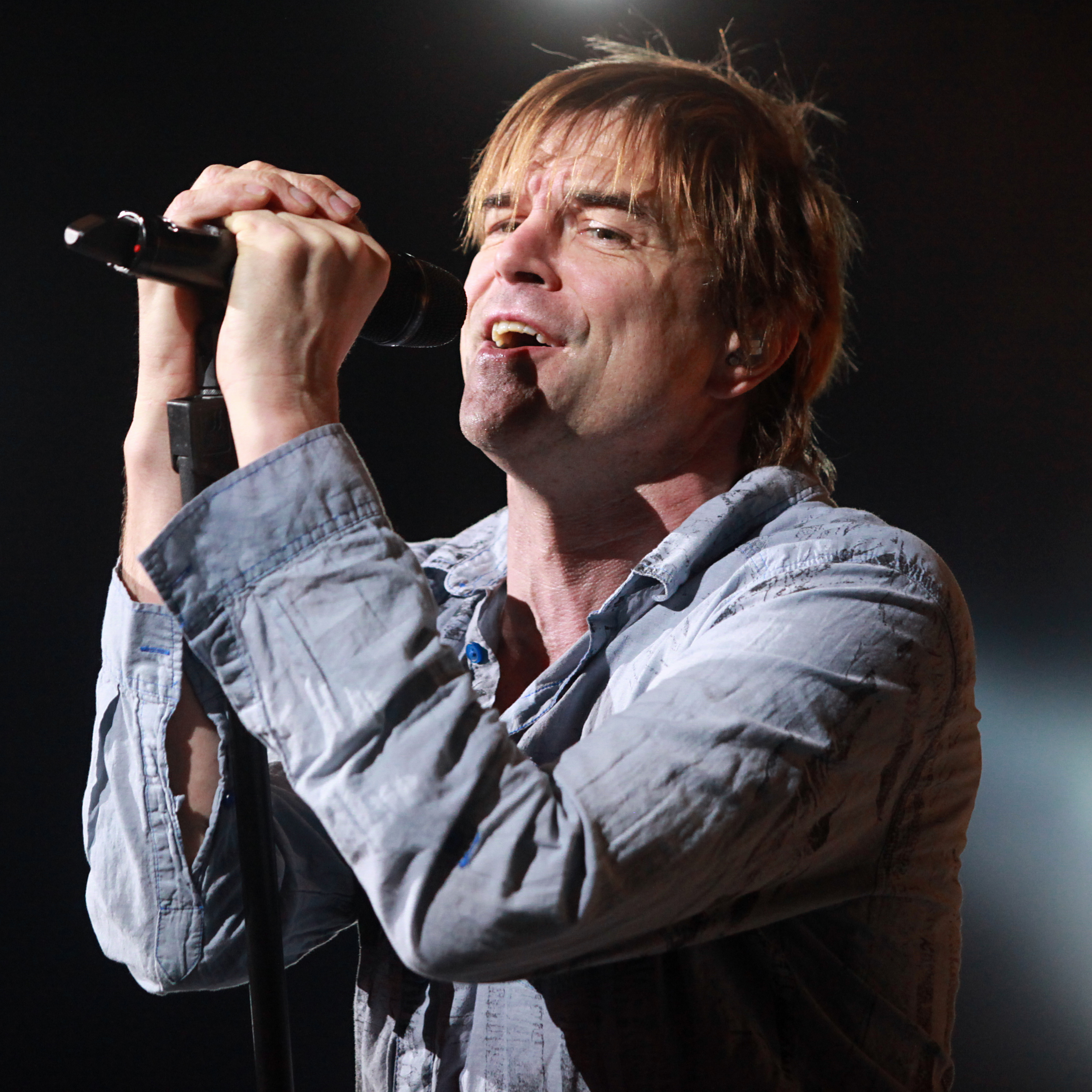
Campino, singer-songwriter of Die Toten Hosen

Kästner is the most prominent protagonist of New Objectivity (in German: Neue Sachlichkeit), a style movement in art, literature, film and architecture during the 1920s in Germany as a reaction against the domination of expressionism. In the literary field, he is characterized by an imageless, unadorned, simple and clear language that is congruent with colloquial language.

== Impact ==
Nowadays, when Kästner's 125th birthday is being celebrated all over the world, one can state the following: More relevant than ever: Erich Kästner (in German: Relevanter denn je: Erich Kästner). As a poet, Kästner has managed to make poetry popular again in Germany, as Deutschlandfunk emphasized in its English forum longer ago. Together with Goethe and other great figures, Kästner is included in the List of „The 10 most important poets and writers from Germany“. There are 96 streets and more than 100 schools named after Erich Kästner in Germany.

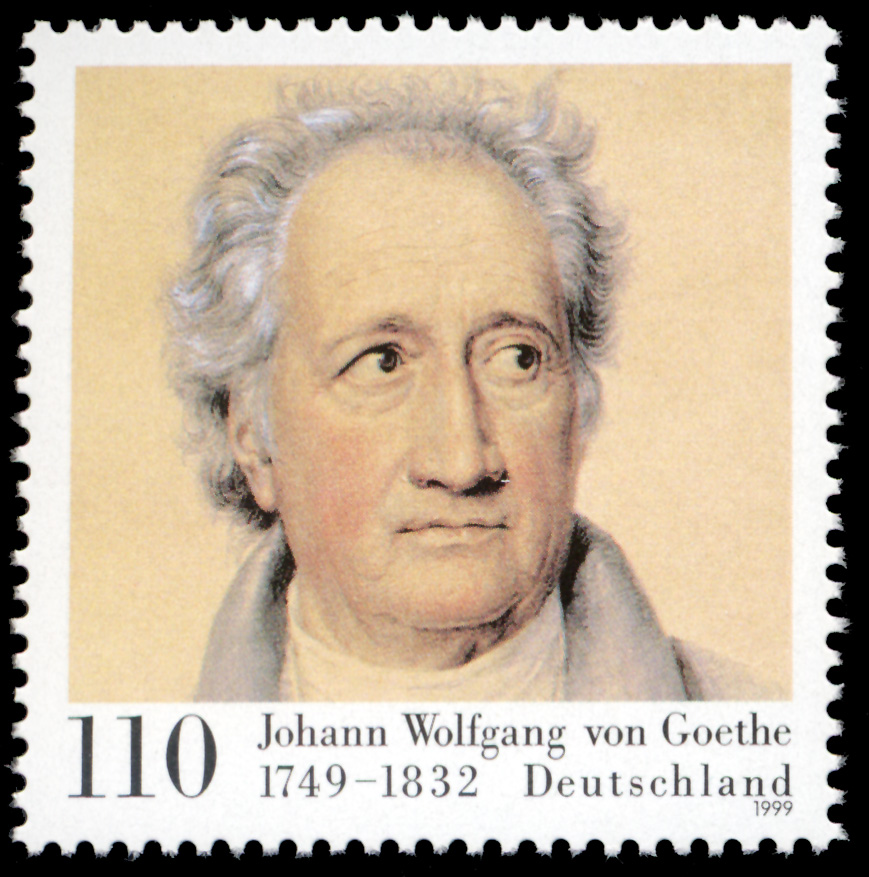
Goethe on a 1999 German stamp

Like many of his other poems, Sobering Romance also has had a tremendous influence on the popularity of the Gebrauchslyrik. This is confirmed not least by the fact that Campino, the singer-songwriter of the band Die Toten Hosen, was allowed to give two lectures on this topic as a Heinrich Heine-guest professor at the Heinrich Heine University Düsseldorf on April 2, 2024. And so even his first lecture made a direct reference to Kästner with this telling title: Kästner, Kraftwerk, Cock Sparrer — Eine Liebeserklärung an die Gebrauchslyrik (A declaration of love to Lyrics of Every Day Use).
