= Alles wird gut =

Single by Die Toten Hosen

from the album 125 Jahre die Toten Hosen: Auf dem Kreuzzug ins Glück
- Released: 1990
- Genre: Punk rock
- Length: 3:36
- Label: Virgin Records
- Songwriters: Andreas Frege; Andreas von Holst

Die Toten Hosen singles chronology
"1000 gute Gründe" (1989)	"Alles wird gut" (1990)	"Azzurro" (1990)

"Alles wird gut" (All will be well) is a song by Die Toten Hosen. It's the first single and the second track from the album Auf dem Kreuzzug ins Glück. The cover of the single is based on a detail from the painting "The Crucifixion" by Peter Paul Rubens.

The song is about going to the new millennium depicting it intimidating, but promising, with irony though. The fact, that pieces of Berlin Wall (torn down in 1989) became popular souvenirs is referenced in the line "Mit einem Stein in der Hand als Souvenir von der Mauer in Berlin/Klopfen wir an die Hintertür vom neuen Paradies" (With a stone in the hand as a souvenir from the wall in Berlin/We're knocking on the backdoor of the new paradise).

There is also an English version of the song on Love, Peace & Money, titled "Year 2000".

== Music video ==
The video was directed by Walter Knofel and is officially unreleased. The band performs in a rocky place, wearing Middle Age-fashion clothes.

== Track listing ==
1. "Alles wird gut" (von Holst/Frege) − 3:36
2. "Fernsehen" (Television) (Frege/Hanns Christian Müller) – 3:47
3. "Traumfrau" (Dream woman) (Meurer/Frege) – 2:21
4. "Abitur" (Breitkopf/Frege) – 1:47

== Charts ==
Year	Country	Position
1990	Germany	15
