= 3 Akkorde für ein Halleluja =

- Release date: 1989
- Country: West Germany
- Language: German

3 Akkorde für ein Halleluja (Three chords for hallelujah in English) is a documentary, directed by Trini Trimpop, about the history of the German band Die Toten Hosen between 1982 and 1988.

The movie first appeared as VHS in November 1989 after the release of the band's album Ein kleines bisschen Horrorschau, which made them known to a wider audience for the first time, but It was not till July 18, 1991, that the film was first shown on the big screen. In 2004 it was rewarded with a golden record.

In 2006 the director Stefan Kloos added comments from the band member Campino and the band's representative Uwe Faust to the 89 minutes long film and launched it as DVD, as which it climbed to the 46th place of the German Charts.
