= Faust in der Tasche =

Single by Die Toten Hosen

from the album The Battle of the Bands
- Released: 1985
- Genre: Punk rock
- Length: 3:55
- Songwriters: Andreas Frege; Andreas von Holst

Die Toten Hosen singles chronology
"Liebesspieler" (1984)	"Faust in der Tasche" (1985)	"Das Altbierlied" (1986)

"Faust in der Tasche" (Fist in the pocket) is a song by Die Toten Hosen, performed under the alias Ricky Curl and the Standing Ovations. It's the only single and the first track from the EP The Battle of the Bands.

The song is narrated by a man, whose girlfriend has left him to date another guy. The narrator is pissed, because he sees them together all the time and it makes him sick.

== Track listing ==
1. "Faust in der Tasche" (Frege, von Holst/Frege) – 3:55 (as Ricky Curl and the Standing Ovations)
2. "La historia del pescador Pepe" (The story of Pepe the fisherman [in Spanish]) (Breitkopf, Frege, von Holst, Meurer, Trimpop/Frege) – 3:17 (as Die Flinger Domspatzen)
