= Reisefieber =

Single by Die Toten Hosen

from the album Opel-Gang
- Released: 1982
- Genre: Punk rock
- Length: 3:46
- Label: Totenkopf
- Songwriter(s): Andreas Frege; Michael Breitkopf; Andreas von Holst; Andreas Meurer; Trini Trimpop

Die Toten Hosen singles chronology
"Wir sind bereit" (1982)	"Reisefieber" (1982)	"Bommerlunder/Opel Gang" (1983)

"Reisefieber" (Travel nerves, lit. Travel fever) is a song by Die Toten Hosen. It's the only single and the fourth track from their debut album Opel-Gang.

The song is about a man who likes to travel a lot and is adventurous, but goes too far to sea and is killed by a wave. A while after the discovery of his body, everything goes on normally for everyone else.

There's also an English version of the song, titled "Seafever".

== Music video ==
The video was directed by Jörg Sonntag. In the video, the band is having a picnic in a stormy weather.

== Track listing ==
1. "Reisefieber" (Breitkopf, Frege, von Holst, Meurer, Trimpop/Frege) − 3:46
2. "Niemandsland" (No one's land) (Frege, von Holst/Frege) − 2:41
