= Never Mind the Hosen, Here's Die Roten Rosen =

Compilation album by Die Toten Hosen
- Released: 1987
- Recorded: 1987
- Genre: Punk rock
- Length: 35:06
- Label: Virgin
- Producer: Die Toten Hosen

Die Toten Hosen chronology
Damenwahl (1986)	Never Mind the Hosen, Here's Die Roten Rosen (1987)	Bis zum bitteren Ende - Die Toten Hosen Live! (1987)

Singles from Never Mind the Hosen, Here's Die Roten Rosen
- 1. "Im Wagen vor mir" Released: 17 August 1987; 2. "Alle Mädchen wollen küssen" Released: 9 November 1987; 3. "Itsy Bitsy Teenie Weenie Honolulu-Strand-Bikini" Released: 23 November 1987

Never Mind the Hosen, Here's Die Roten Rosen, sometimes Never Mind the Hosen, Here's Die Roten Rosen (aus Düsseldorf) is the first cover album of the German punk band Die Toten Hosen, released under the pseudonym Die Roten Rosen (The Red Roses). The band covers German schlagers on the album. This is the first DTH album to reach the charts. According to Campino, this album has won the most from the release of remasters (2007), because the impact was initially lost, but regained with remastering.

The title and the cover are parodies of Sex Pistols' album Never Mind the Bollocks, Here's the Sex Pistols. To coincide with the pseudonym, which was used for the first time, the label was changed from ToT 69 to ROT 69 and Totenkopf to Rosenkopf.

== Track listing ==
1. "Itsy Bitsy Teenie Weenie Honolulu-Strand-Bikini" (...Honolulu-beach-bikini) − 1:54 (Club Honolulu cover)
2. "Alle Mädchen wollen küssen" (All girls want to kiss) − 1:26 (Peter Kraus cover)
3. "Im Wagen vor mir" (In the car in front of me) − 3:28 (Henry Valentino cover)
4. "Für Gaby tu' ich alles" (I'd do anything for Gabi) − 2:29 (Gerd Böttcher cover)
5. "Wir" (Us) − 3:36 (Freddy Quinn cover)
6. "Und sowas nennst du Liebe" (And something like that you call love) − 2:27 (Chris Andrews cover)
7. "Kein Gnadenbrot" (lit. No charity) (Kunze, Igelhoff, Fink) − 3:40
8. "Halbstark" (Half-strong) − 2:26 (The Yankees cover)
9. "Die Sauerkrautpolka" (The sauerkraut polka) − 1:50 (Gus Backus cover)
10. "Wenn du mal allein bist" (When you're alone someday) − 2:29 (Manfred Schnelldorfer cover)
11. "Zwei Mädchen aus Germany" (Two girls from Germany) − 2:14 (Paul Anka cover)
12. "Mein Hobby sind die Girls" (My hobby is [are] girls) − 2:53 (The Germans cover)
13. "Medley" − 4:14
  - "Cinderella Baby" (Drafi Deutscher cover)
  - "Ich kauf mir lieber einen Tirolerhut" (I'll rather buy myself a Tyrol hat) (Billy Mo cover)
  - "Der Fahrstuhl nach oben ist besetzt" (The lift upwards is occupied) (Hazy Osterwald Sextett cover)
  - "Schöne Maid" (Pretty maid) (Tony Marshall cover)
  - "Mama" (Heintje cover)
  - "Adelheid" (Billy Mo cover)
  - "Da sprach der alte Häuptling der Indianer" (Then the old Indian chieftain spoke) (Gus Backus cover)
  - "Schön ist es auf der Welt zu sein" (It's nice to be on Earth) (Anita/Roy Black cover)

=== 2007 remastered anniversary edition bonus tracks ===
14. "Motorbiene" (lit. Motor bee) – 1:59 (Peter Kraus cover)
15. "Wärst du doch in Düsseldorf geblieben" (If only you had stayed in Düsseldorf) – 2:22 (Dorthe cover)
16. "Schade um die Rosen" (A pity about the roses) (Niessen/Niessen) – 2:22
17. "Ich steh an der Bar und habe kein Geld" (I'm standing at the bar and I have no money) (Parsons) – 2:05 (Bobbejaan cover)
18. "Popokatepetl-Twist" – 1:41 (Nevermind demo; Caterina Valente & Silvio Francesco cover)
19. "1000 Taler" (1000 Thaler) (Frege, Hanns Christian Müller/Müller, Frege) – 1:40 (as Andi Frege & die Flinger Domspatzen)
20. "Baby, du sollst nicht weinen" (Baby, you shouldn't cry) (Frege, Müller/Müller, Frege) – 3:28 (as Andi Frege & die Flinger Domspatzen)
21. "Itsy Bitsy Teenie Weenie Yellow-Polkadot-Bikini" (Paul Vance, Lee Pockriss) – 2:08 (English version)

== Personnel ==
- Campino – vocals
- Andreas von Holst – guitar
- Michael Breitkopf – guitar
- Andreas Meurer – bass
- Wolfgang Rohde – drums

== Charts ==
Year	Country	Position
1987	Germany	21
