= Liebesspieler =

Single by Die Toten Hosen

from the album Unter falscher Flagge
- Released: 1984
- Genre: Punk rock
- Length: 2:50
- Label: Totenkopf
- Songwriter(s): Andreas Frege; Andreas von Holst; Michael Breitkopf

Die Toten Hosen singles chronology
"Kriminaltango" (1984)	"Liebesspieler" (1984)	"Faust in der Tasche" (1985)

"Liebesspieler" (Love Player) is a song by Die Toten Hosen. It's the only single and the second track from their album Unter falscher Flagge.

The song is about a man who goes to the horse race track to bet and win money. At first it seems that the horse (named Liebesspieler) is going to win, but the horse doesn't win and the money is lost.

The band had a session with DJ John Peel on 30 June 1984 and they released the songs as b-sides to the single.

There is also an English version of the song on Love, Peace & Money, titled "Love Is Here".

== Track listing ==
1. "Liebesspieler" (von Holst, Breitkopf, Frege/Frege) − 2:50
  Die John Peel Session:
2. "Spiel mir das Lied vom Tod" (Play me the song of death; German title for Once Upon a Time in the West) (Ennio Morricone) − 1:14
3. "Es ist vorbei" − 2:27
4. "Till to the Bitter End" (Frege/Frege) − 2:48 (English version of "Bis zum bitteren Ende")
5. "Seafever" (Breitkopf, Frege, von Holst, Meurer, Trimpop/Frege) − 3:38 (English version of "Reisefieber")
6. "Hofgarten" (Court garden) (Breitkopf, von Holst, Meurer/von Holst) − 1:41
