= Wärst du doch in Düsseldorf geblieben =

Song
- Language: German
- Genre: schlager
- Songwriters: Georg Buschor; Christian Bruhn

Wärst du doch in Düsseldorf geblieben (If only you had stayed in Düsseldorf) is a song written by Georg Buschor and Christian Bruhn and made famous by a 1968 recording by Dorthe Kollo.

Siw Malmkvist recorded the song in Swedish, as "Ingenting går upp mot gamla Skåne" (Nothing comes close to old Scania). It was used as a B-side for her single Mamma är lik sin mamma ("Sadie, the Cleaning Lady"), released August 1968., with lyrics in Swedish Per Spelman. With the song, Siw Malmkvist scored a Svensktoppen for two weeks between 20–27 October 1968, with positions 7 and 9.
