= Jörg Sonntag =

German historian (born 1977)

Joerg (Jörg) Sonntag (born 1977 in Erlabrunn, Saxony) is a German historian of medieval history.

== Biography ==
Sonntag studied Medieval History, Saxon Regional History and Protestant Theology at the TU Dresden and Eastern Church History at the University of Marburg from 1997 to 2002.

After receiving a doctoral scholarship from the Konrad Adenauer Foundation, he completed his doctorate in medieval history at Dresden in 2007 with a dissertation on the monastic ritual world of the high Middle Ages, for which he was awarded the Faculty Prize. From 2009 to 2012, he worked at the Research Center for the Comparative History of Religious Orders (FOVOG), first at the Catholic University of Eichstätt, then at Dresden. In 2012, he was a George William Cottrell-Member at the Institute for Advanced Study in Princeton (New Jersey, USA). Since 2013, he has been a research associate and since 2021, a working group leader in the project "Monasteries in the High Middle Ages: Innovation Laboratories of European Life Designs and Models of Order" of the Saxon Academy and the Heidelberg Academy of Sciences. From 2014 to 2021, he was head researcher and spokesperson of the international DFG Scientific Network: "Imitation. Mechanisms of a Cultural Principle in the Middle Ages".

Sonntag completed his habilitation in 2021 with a cultural-historical thesis on "Playing God in the Middle Ages". In the same year, he was appointed a private lecturer (Privatdozent) in Medieval History at the TU Dresden and was elected as a member of the Young Forum of the Saxon Academy of Sciences.

In the summer semester of 2022, he was a professor of Medieval History at the University of Regensburg.

== Research ==
Sonntag focuses on medieval cultural studies. He has studied the comparative history of religious orders, including models, rituals and forms of symbolization as well as the cultural functions of games, of imitations, and of hair in medieval times.

=== Symbols and Monasteries ===
In his book Klosterleben im Spiegel des Zeichenhaften (Monastic Life in the Mirror of the Symbolic), Sonntag applied the case-study of the traditional Benedictine communities and the Cistercians to investigate the following aspects of monastic life: monastic vows, hierarchical structures, meal communion, foot washing, care of the sick and the dying, guest services, and travel.

=== Games in Medieval Times ===
In Religiosus ludens, Sonntag was one of the first scholars to study the roles of games in medieval monasteries.

=== The Rule Commentary of Pontigny ===
Sonntag critically edited a little known commentary on the Rule of Saint Benedict, which originates from Pontigny. Nicole Bériou wrote the preface to the edition. This work is actually an extensive collection of sermons.

=== The Williamite and Caulite Orders ===
Sonntag led the publication of the scientific editions of the statutes of the Williamite Order (1251–1349) and the legal texts of the Caulite Order (1220–1300, the latter with a preface by Phillip Adamo, the grand seigneur of Caulite research). Both scientific editions are provided with a translation.

=== Hair in History ===
Sonntag has studied the cultural meaning of human hair in the Middle Ages. He applied a new approach that analyzes the interrelations between the social, political, ethical and religious functions of hair, and reveals the overarching structures of its usage.

== Academic Books ==
=== Monographs ===
- Die Gesetzgebung der Cauliten im 13. Jahrhundert Ausgewählte Zeugnisse ihrer Verfassung. Edition and Translation. Verlag Schnell & Steiner. Regensburg. 2022. ISBN 978-3-7954-3731-2. OCLC 1302591035
- Die Statuten der Wilhelmiten (1251-1348) Zeugnisse der Verfassung eines europäischen Ordens : Edition and Translation. Verlag Schnell & Steiner (1. Auflage ed.). Regensburg. 2019. ISBN 978-3-7954-3421-2
- Sermones in Regulam s. Benedicti: ein zisterziensischer Regelkommentar aus Pontigny. Berlin. ISBN 978-3-643-13428-8. OCLC 985099779
- Klosterleben im Spiegel des Zeichenhaften : symbolisches Denken und Handeln hochmittelalterlicher Mönche zwischen Dauer und Wandel, Regel und Gewohnheit. Berlin. ISBN 978-3-8258-1033-7. OCLC 463662251

=== Other Volumes ===
- Imitationen. Systematische Zugänge zu einem kulturellen Prinzip des Mittelalters (Münstersche Mittelalter-Schriften 83), Paderborn 2021, ed. together with Michael Grünbart and Gerald Schwedler.
- Disorder. Expressions of an Amorphous Phenomenon in Human History, ed. together with Mirko Breitenstein, Münster 2020.
- Nachahmen im Mittelalter. Dimensionen – Mechanismen – Funktionen (Archiv für Kulturgeschichte. Beihefte 82), Köln / Weimar / Wien 2018, ed. together with Andreas Büttner, Birgit Kynast and Gerald Schwedler.
- Geist und Gestalt. Monastische Raumkonzepte als Ausdrucksformen religiöser Leitideen im Mittelalter (Vita regularis. Abhandlungen 69), Berlin 2016.
- Loyalty in the Middle Ages. Ideal and Practice of a Cross-Social Value. (Brepols Collected Essays in European Culture 5), Turnhout 2015, ed. together with Coralie Zermatten).
- Identität und Gemeinschaft. Vier Zugänge zu Eigengeschichten und Selbstbildern institutioneller Ordnungen (Vita regularis. Abhandlungen 67), Berlin 2015, ed, together with Mirko Breitenstein, Julia Burkhardt and Stefan Burkhardt).
- Religiosus Ludens. Das Spiel als kulturelles Phänomen in mittelalterlichen Klöstern und Orden (Arbeiten zur Kirchengeschichte 122), Berlin / Boston 2013.
