= Fab Five Freddy =

American artist

Fab 5 Freddy
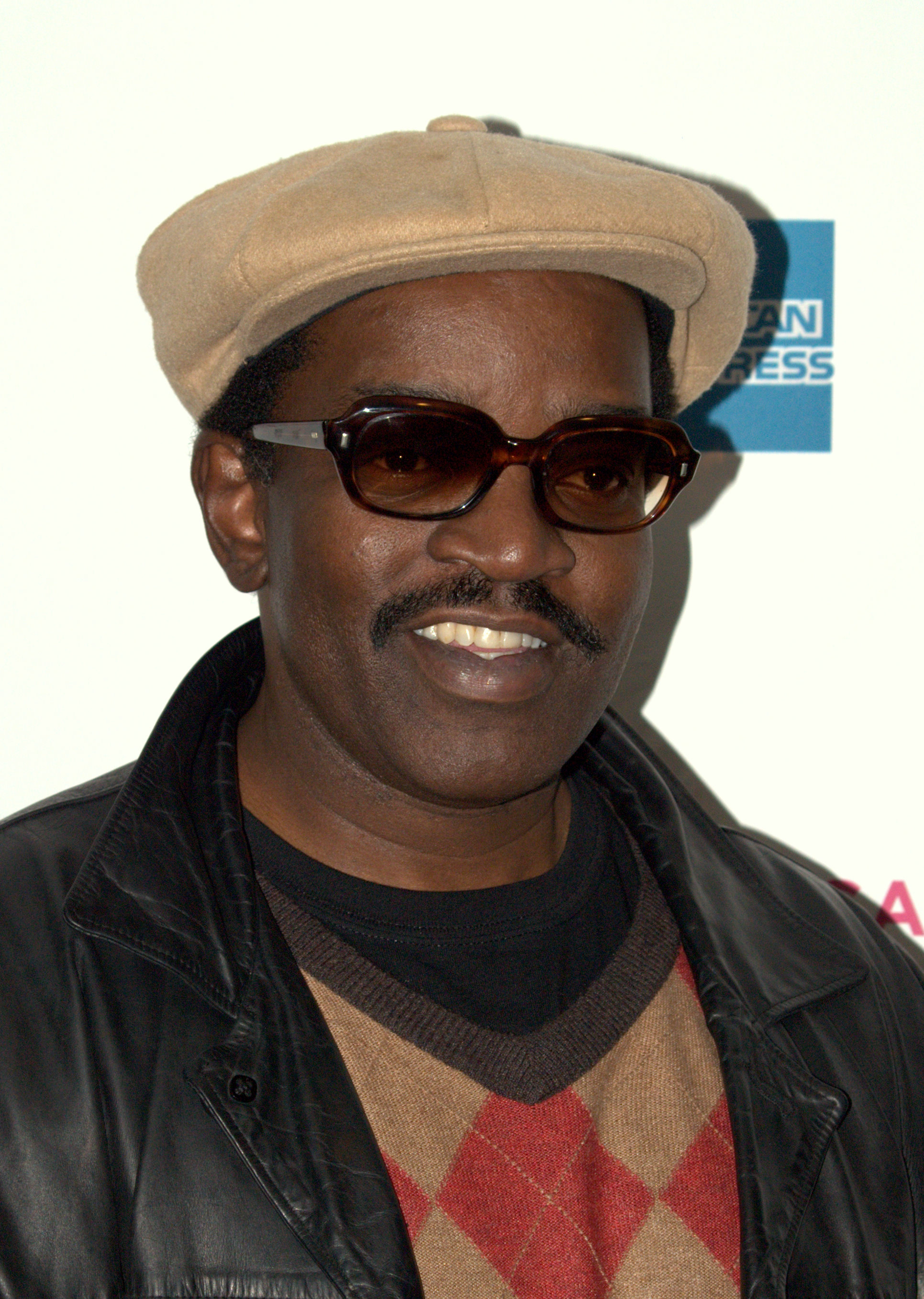
- Fab 5 Freddy at the 2009 Tribeca Film Festival

Background information
- Born: Fred Brathwaite; August 31, 1959 (age 67)
- Origin: Bedford–Stuyvesant, New York City, New York, U.S.
- Genre: Hip-hop
- Occupations: Visual artist; filmmaker; musician; DJ; multi-instrumentalist; master of ceremonies
- Years active: 1978–present

Fred Brathwaite (born August 31, 1959), more popularly known as Fab 5 Freddy, is an American visual artist, filmmaker, TV personality, and hip-hop pioneer. He is considered one of the architects of the street art movement. Brathwaite emerged in New York's downtown underground creative scene in the late 1970s as a graffiti artist. He was the bridge between the burgeoning uptown rap scene and the downtown No Wave art scene. He gained wider recognition in 1981 when Debbie Harry rapped "Fab 5 Freddy told me everybody's fly" on the Blondie song "Rapture". In the late 1980s, Brathwaite became the first host of the groundbreaking hip-hop music video show Yo! MTV Raps. In 2026, Brathwaite released his memoir, Everybody's Fly: A Life of Art, Music and Changing the Culture, cowritten with Vanity Fair contributor Mark Rozzo.

== Career ==
In the late 1970s, Freddy became a member of the Brooklyn-based graffiti group the Fabulous 5, known for painting the entire side of New York City Subway cars. Along with other Fabulous 5 member Lee Quiñones, under his direction they began to shift from street graffiti to transition into the art world and in 1979 they both exhibited in a prestigious gallery in Rome, Italy, Galleria LaMedusa. In December 1979, they painted an entire subway train with cartoon-style depictions of giant Campbell's Soup cans as an homage to Pop artist Andy Warhol.

Freddy became a regular guest on Glenn O'Brien's public access cable show TV Party. As a frequent attendant at the Mudd Club and a participant in seminal The Times Square Show, Freddy was a bridge between the New York uptown graffiti and early rap scene and the downtown No Wave art scene. "I was bringing the whole music, hip-hop, art, break dancing, and urban cultural thing to the downtown table", he said.

In late 1980, Glenn O'Brien cast Freddy, along with fellow Lower East Side graffiti writer Quiñones, in the film New York Beat (later released as Downtown 81). The film showcased artist Jean-Michel Basquiat in his Lower Manhattan environment and the culture that surrounded it. Blondie lead singer Debbie Harry also appeared in the film and in early 1981, Freddy made a cameo in the Blondie music video for "Rapture." As recounted in the 1999 TV documentary The Hip Hop Years, the "Rapture" video featured Freddy in a cameo role painting graffiti art in the background. (Grandmaster Flash, who was also name-checked in the song, did not show up on the day of the shoot, so Basquiat took his place behind the turntables). "Rapture" was the first hip-hop video to be shown on MTV.

Freddy connected with New York underground filmmaker Charlie Ahearn, who he had met at The Times Square Show, and they began production on the film Wild Style (1983) in 1981, which showcased artist Quiñones in the Uptown, Manhattan, environment of the Bronx and the burgeoning hip-hop culture. The movie Wild Style, the first film to illustrate hip-hop culture, grew from an idea Freddy had to refute the negative depiction of New York City's urban youth and to link for the first time break dancing, rapping, DJing and graffiti under one umbrella or branches from the same tree. Freddy created the film's original music, co-produced and ended up in one of the leading roles as the charismatic Bronx hip-hop club promoter and former graffiti artist, Phade.

In April 1981, Freddy co-curated with Futura 2000 the graffiti-related art show Beyond Words, at the Mudd Club which contained their own work along with Basquiat, Rammellzee, Keith Haring, Kenny Scharf and others. This was the first time the many members of the Bronx hip-hop scene had appeared in the downtown New York City art world. On his relationship with art dealers, Freddy said,

They didn't know me, but they had heard of graffiti. But they didn't understand the importance and the significance of what happened because, see, really what this comes down to is that my background basically is that of a vandal. I vandalize public property ... . In the real world, in New York, what made graffiti what it is, was the marriage which was the placing of the individual's mark on that blank surface. But that blank surface that the individual graffiti person tags on, belongs to someone.

In May 1981, Freddy was booked on Henry Chalfant's "Graffiti Rock" performance with Rock Steady Crew at Common Ground gallery in SoHo (not to be confused with Holman's Graffiti Rock TV show pilot). The show was cancelled due to violence, but was rescheduled in October at another venue called The Kitchen.

After the Rock Steady Crew and Afrika Bambaataa were booked as the opening act for Bow Wow Wow at The Ritz nightclub in September 1981, Ruza Blue decided to book them at Negril and begin a night called "Wheels of Steel". That became so popular that it was closed down by the fire department for over-capacity, and Freddy helped Blue (whom he dubbed "Kool Lady Blue") find another home for the party. Together they chose The Roxy Roller Rink in NYC, which gained national fame once used in the film Beat Street (1984).

In 1982 the single "Change the Beat" produced by Bill Laswell’s band Material had an A-side featuring Freddy rapping the song in both English and French, while the B-side was a shorter version of the same song, this time performed entirely in French by female rapper Beside of the band Time Zone, who was credited on the initial pressings of the record as Fab 5 Betty. Freddy utilized a vocoder with a white noise carrier during the chorus and at the end of the B-side track. When the beat stops in Beside's version of the song, it is disputed as to whether Freddy or Laswell's manager says "Ahhhhh, this stuff is really fresh", a line which is quite possibly the most scratched sample in the history of hip-hop music. It was first utilized as a scratch sample on the 1983 Herbie Hancock single "Rockit", featuring scratching by legendary DJ and turntablist Grand Mixer DXT, and has been used in over 2000 hip-hop tracks since.

Freddy's "Change the Beat" for Celluloid Records would also lead to four other records, including a song about graffiti painting by Futura 2000 with music performed by The Clash, and all were released together first in France and was soon followed by the first hip-hop tour in Europe billed as "New York City Rap", in 1982.

In 1983, Freddy produced a hip-hop version of "Eisgekühlter Bommerlunder" called "Hip Hop Bommi Bop" together with the German punk rock band Die Toten Hosen, which is said to be the first co-production of punk and hip-hop.

In 1988, Freddy became the first hip-hop VJ by hosting the MTV music video show entitled Yo! MTV Raps. He later went on to be an associate producer on the 1991 film New Jack City in which he also made an appearance. That year he was the subject of an extensive profile by Susan Orlean in The New Yorker which began with the sentence "The coolest person in New York at the moment is a man named Fred Brathwaite". In 1994, he directed the music video "One Love" by rapper Nas. In 2007, he played a murdered rap artist named Terrence 'Fulla T' Smith on the TV series Law & Order: Criminal Intent in the episode "Flipped". The same year, he made a small cameo in the film American Gangster directed by Ridley Scott. In 2008, he appears as a special wedding guest in the film Rachel Getting Married, along with other notable musicians, as conceived by producer Jonathan Demme to enhance the expansive and varied soundtrack and wedding members, in contrast with the normal duality of a traditional wedding. In 2016, he played the role of Atticus Howard in "Mob Rules" the fourth episode of the seventh season of the CBS police procedural drama Blue Bloods.

On August 11, 2017, an animated version of Freddy appeared in a Google Doodle as a narrator, which observed the 44th anniversary of DJ Kool Herc's pioneering use of the hip-hop break.

In 2019, coinciding with the release of his Netflix film Grass Is Greener, Freddy served as creative director for the full-size hip-hop photography and culture exhibit entitled Contact High: A Visual History of Hip-Hop, based on the 2018 book of the same name created and written by Vikki Tobak (published by Clarkson Potter). The exhibit was hosted by The Annenberg Space for Photography in Los Angeles. Freddy served on several group discussion and lecture panels regarding the show in the months before and during the exhibition.

In 2026, Brathwaite published his memoir, Everybody's Fly: A Life of Art, Music and Changing the Culture, co-authored with Mark Rozzo and published by Viking Press. The title refers to the lyric "Fab 5 Freddy told me everybody's fly" from the 1980 Blondie song "Rapture".

== Personal life ==
Brathwaite was the godson of jazz drummer and composer Max Roach.
