= Eisgekühlter Bommerlunder =

Song by Die Toten Hosen

"Eisgekühlter Bommerlunder" (Bommerlunder On The Rocks) is a German drinking song by the group Die Toten Hosen. The song is repeated over and over, each time the song is sung quicker and a pitch higher, until performers can not sing anymore.

Bommerlunder is a brand of schnapps, popular in Northern Germany.

== Song ==
"Bommerlunder/Opel Gang"

Single by Die Toten Hosen
- Released: 1983
- Genre: Punk rock
- Length: "Eisgekühlter Bommerlunder": 2:58 "Opel-Gang": 1:59 (Single version); 1:47 (Album version)
- Label: Totenkopf
- Songwriter(s): Eisgekühlter Bommerlunder: Molinare; Dt.Spez; Trini Trimpop; Opel-Gang: Andreas Frege; Michael Breitkopf; Andreas von Holst; Andreas Meurer; Trini Trimpop

Die Toten Hosen singles chronology
"Reisefieber" (1982)	"Bommerlunder/Opel Gang" (1983)	"Hip Hop Bommi Bop" (1983)

Die Toten Hosen released the song as a double A-side single with "Opel-Gang" in 1983, although the single is mostly referred to as "Eisgekühlter Bommerlunder". The single was released with a tiny bottle of Bommerlunder included in the packaging. The single version of "Opel-Gang" is a bit different from the version released on Opel-Gang. "Eisgekühlter Bommerlunder" was not originally released on any albums, but the song was released later on the 1993 best-of album Reich & sexy.

In the same year, they produced a hip hop version of "Eisgekühlter Bommerlunder" together with Fab Five Freddy, called "Hip Hop Bommi Bop".

=== Music video ===
The video for "Eisgekühlter Bommerlunder" was directed by Wolfgang Büld. It shows a wedding in a church turn into total chaos, partly caused by drinking Bommerlunder.

=== Track listing ===
1. "Eisgekühlter Bommerlunder" (Molinare, Dt.Spez.; Trimpop/Trimpop) − 2:58
2. "Opel-Gang" (von Holst, Frege/Breitkopf, Frege, von Holst, Meurer, Trimpop) − 1:59
3. "Armee der Verlierer" (Army of losers) (Frege, von Holst/Frege) − 4:23

=== Cover versions / Other versions ===
Eisgekühlter Bommerlunder was sporadically covered as a party song.

In 1993, for example, the electro musician Tommi Stumpff and Luc Van Leuven released a techno version of the song entitled Bommerlunder as a maxi single under the name Die Technodosen.
