= Learning English, Lesson One =

Compilation album by Die Toten Hosen
- Released: 11 November 1991; 18 October 1994 (USA import version); 2007 (jubilee edition)
- Recorded: 1991
- Genres: Punk rock; proto-punk
- Length: 49:10; 77:18 (re-release)
- Labels: ToT; Virgin
- Producers: Jon Caffery; Die Toten Hosen

Die Toten Hosen chronology
125 Jahre die Toten Hosen: Auf dem Kreuzzug ins Glück (1990)	Learning English, Lesson One (1991)	The Nightmare Continues E.P. (1991)

Alternative cover
- USA import cover

Professional ratings
Review scores
Source	Rating
AllMusic	4/5 stars
Robert Christgau	(dud)

Learning English, Lesson One or Learning English, Lesson 1 (other punctuation variations possible) is a cover album by the German punk band Die Toten Hosen. The album includes covers of mostly British bands, which were big influences on the band.

It is the first all-English album for Die Toten Hosen; the first English language studio album was released three years later. It made the band better known outside of German-speaking countries.

The album features many guest stars, including Johnny Thunders, who died only days after recording a guest guitar performance on "Born to Lose" for Learning English. According to the members of the band, he looked very ill when he was in the studio.

The album has a central parody theme of an independent language-learning tape, where "Janet and John" are the teachers. Janet and John are heard in short humorous introductions.

== Critical reception ==
Trouser Press wrote that "the excellently performed and impressively reverent Learning English is less a tribute than a precise re-creation." People called the album "more than just a quirky collector’s item ... [it] is the perfect way to look back—or discover—where [punk] all began." Washington City Paper deemed it "a sappy, charming album of class-of-'77 covers."

== Track listing ==
1. Learning English • Step One − 0:31
2. "Blitzkrieg Bop" − 1:50 (Ramones)
3. "Brickfield Nights" − 3:34 (The Boys)
4. Step Two − 0:11
5. "Just Thirteen" − 2:30 (The Lurkers)
6. "If the Kids Are United" − 3:08 (Sham 69)
7. "Nasty Nasty" − 2:06 (999)
8. Step Three − 0:17
9. "Dirty Pictures" − 2:15 (Radio Stars)
10. "Baby Baby" − 3:13 (The Vibrators)
11. "Gary Gilmore's Eyes" − 2:15 (The Adverts)
12. "Born to Lose" − 3:21 (The Heartbreakers)
13. How the Rockafellas Went to Hollywood − 0:18
14. "Do You Remember" − 3:25 (The Rockafellas)
15. "Carnival in Rio (Punk Was)" − 3:08 (Campino, von Holst/Ronald Biggs)
16. Step Four − 0:18
17. "Right to Work" − 3:03 (Chelsea)
18. "Whole Wide World" − 3:19 (Wreckless Eric)
19. "Smash It Up" − 2:57 (The Damned)
20. "Stranglehold" − 2:11 (UK Subs)
21. Step Five − 0:22
22. "Love and a Molotov Cocktail" − 2:30 (The Flys)
23. "Do Anything You Wanna Do" − 4:27 (Eddie and the Hot Rods)
24. Goodbye from Janet & John − 1:01

=== 2007 remastered anniversary edition bonus tracks ===
25. "No One Is Innocent" (Steve Jones/Biggs) – 3:03 (from "Carnival in Rio (Punk Was)"; Sex Pistols cover)
26. "Should I Stay or Should I Go?" (Mick Jones/Joe Strummer) – 2:43 (from "Warum werde ich nicht satt?"; The Clash cover)
27. "Rockaway Beach" (Colvin, Cummings, Erdelyi, Hyman) – 1:59 (from "Alles wird vorübergehen"; Ramones cover)
28. "Eddie & Sheena" (Rogers) – 4:24 (Wayne County & the Electric Chairs cover; recorded for Jürgen Krause's birthday, who is a good friend of the band)
29. "Richmond" (Billingsley, Allen, Griffiths) – 2:39 (from the US version of Learning English Lesson 1; Pin Point cover)
30. "In Still of the Night" (Frege, Plain) – 4:11 (Learning English Lesson 1 demo)
31. "Anything but Love" (Frege, Dangerfield) – 3:58 (Learning English Lesson 1 demo)
32. "I Met Her at the Jet Grill" (Meurer/Frege, Plain) – 1:56 (Learning English Lesson 1 demo)

== Singles ==
- 1991: "Carnival in Rio (Punk Was)"
- 1991: "Baby Baby"
- 1992: "Whole Wide World"
- 1992: "If the Kids Are United

== Personnel ==
- Campino - vocals
- Andreas von Holst - guitar
- Michael Breitkopf - guitar
- Andreas Meurer - bass
- Wolfgang Rohde - drums

== Charts ==
Year	Country	Position
1992	Germany	30
1991	Switzerland	23
1991	Austria	38

Chart performance for Learning English, Lesson One
Chart (2021)	Peak position
German Albums (Offizielle Top 100)	3
