= Kriminaltango =

1959 Italian and German pop songs

"Kriminaltango" (Criminal tango) is a traditional pop song released in 1959. The Italian original by Piero Trombetta only achieved a modest success, whereas the German version performed by Hazy Osterwald became a big hit in Germany, Austria and Switzerland.

Describing scenes from tavern, the Osterwald version juxtaposes the appearance of shady figures ("dunkle Gestalten") and their mysterious dealings with dancing tango ("Und sie tanzen einen Tango"). The song culminates with a shot in the dark and the arrival of the police, unable to assemble any evidence.

The song was covered by Die Toten Hosen, featuring Kurt Raab, in a non-album single in 1984.

It was also covered by The Deadfly Ensemble, appearing as a bonus track on their album "An Entire Wardrobe of Doubt and Uncertainty".

== Die Toten Hosen cover ==
"Kriminaltango"

Single by Die Toten Hosen with Kurt Raab
- Released: 1984
- Genre: Punk rock
- Length: 3:32
- Label: Totenkopf
- Songwriter(s): Kurt Feltz; Trombetta

Die Toten Hosen singles chronology
"Schöne Bescherung" (1983)	"Kriminaltango" (1984)	"Liebesspieler" (1984)

=== Track listing ===
1. "Kriminaltango" (Trombetta/Feltz) − 3:32
2. "Allein vor deinem Haus" (Alone in front of your house) (von Holst, Frege/Frege, Meurer, Trimpop) − 2:26
3. "Es ist vorbei...." (It's over....) (Frege, von Holst/Frege, Meurer, Trimpop) − 3:09
