= Ein kleines bisschen Horrorschau =

Ein kleines Bisschen Horrorschau

Studio album by Die Toten Hosen
- Released: 1988; 2007 (jubilee edition)
- Recorded: 1988; Schauspielhaus Bonn; Preußenton, Berlin; Mascot, Köln
- Genre: Punk rock
- Length: 42:26; 74:37 (re-release)
- Label: Totenkopf (Virgin Records)
- Producer: John Caffery, Die Toten Hosen

Die Toten Hosen chronology
Bis zum bitteren Ende - Die Toten Hosen Live! (1987)	Ein kleines Bisschen Horrorschau (1988)	125 Jahre die Toten Hosen: Auf dem Kreuzzug ins Glück (1990)

Singles from Ein kleines Bisschen Horrorschau
- 1. "Hier kommt Alex" Released: 3 October 1988; 2. "1000 gute Gründe" Released: 23 February 1989

Ein kleines bisschen Horrorschau ("A little bit of horrorshow") (subtitled: Die Lieder aus Clockwork Orange und andere schmutzige Melodien ["The songs from Clockwork Orange and other dirty melodies"]) is the sixth LP by Die Toten Hosen, released in 1988. This is considered by the band as the best DTH album as of 1988.

The LP is mainly a concept album based on the film A Clockwork Orange by Stanley Kubrick, which in turn is based on the book of the same name by Anthony Burgess, although not all of the songs are about the main theme. The idea of the LP has its origin during a performance of A Clockwork Orange at Theater Bonn where the band acted as supernumeraries and as supporting band. Songs 1, 4, 5, 8, 10, 12 are from the play and these are the ones recorded in Schauspielhaus Bonn, other songs were recorded in Berlin and Cologne.

The songs are linked together by snippets of Beethoven's 9th Symphony (played by a symphony orchestra), whose music plays a prominent role in A Clockwork Orange (especially the 9th symphony). The cover features a famous painting of Beethoven by Joseph Karl Stieler. The word 'Horrorschau' is a play on the Nadsat word 'horrorshow', which comes from the Russian хорошо (khorosho) and means 'good' or 'well'. A couple of Nadsat words are used in songs too.

The song "Hier kommt Alex" appears as a bonus track in the game Guitar Hero III: Legends of Rock. It is also included in the European release of Rock Band, and as a downloadable track on the American version. The song is also available for download in Guitar Hero World Tour.

"Bye, bye Alex" is structurally and musically similar to "Hier kommt Alex".

== Track listing ==
1. "Hier kommt Alex" ("Here comes Alex") (Meurer, Frege) – 3:53
2. "1000 gute Gründe" ("1000 good reasons") (Breitkopf, Frege) – 3:33
3. "Ein Schritt zuviel" ("One step too much") (von Holst, Frege) – 2:22
4. "Keine Ahnung" ("No idea") (Frege, Frege) – 2:08
5. "Die Farbe Grau" ("The colour grey") (Frege, Frege) – 3:52
6. "180 Grad" ("180 degrees") (Meurer, Frege) – 4:33
7. "Mehr davon" ("More of it") (von Holst, Frege) – 5:10
8. "Zahltag" ("Payday") (Breitkopf, Frege) – 2:42
9. "35 Jahre" ("35 years") (Rohde, Frege, von Holst) – 2:15
10. "Musterbeispiel" ("Prime example") (Frege, von Holst) – 3:55
11. "Testbild" ("Test card", lit. "Test picture") (Frege, Frege) – 3:17
12. "Bye, bye Alex" (Rohde, Frege) – 2:58

=== 2007 remastered anniversary edition bonus tracks ===
13. "Zum Chef (Später Dank)" (To the boss (Late gratitude)) (von Holst, Frege) – 2:10 (from "Hier kommt Alex")
14. "Jo singt (Das Wort zum Sonntag)" (Jo sings (The word to Sunday)) (von Holst, Frege) – 0:46 (from "Hier kommt Alex"; "Das Wort zum Sonntag" from Damenwahl)
15. "Liebeslied" (Love song) (Breitkopf, Frege) – 3:50 (from "Hier kommt Alex")
16. "Die Farbe Grau" – 3:51 (from the play "A Clockwork Orange" in Schauspielhaus Bonn)
17. "Zahltag" – 2:43 (from the play "A Clockwork Orange" in Schauspielhaus Bonn)
18. "Musterbeispiel" – 3:51 (from the play "A Clockwork Orange" in Schauspielhaus Bonn)
19. "1200 Grad" (Breitkopf, Frege) – 4:35 (Ein kleines bißchen Horrorschau demo)
20. "Einmal in vier Jahren" (Once in four years) (Breitkopf, Frege) – 4:49 (Kauf MICH! demo)
21. "Schwarze Sheriffs" (Black sheriffs) (Frege, von Holst) – 3:39 (Kauf MICH! demo)
22. "Zigarettenautomat" (Cigarette machine) (Frege, Hanns Christian Müller, Müller, Frege) – 2:04 (Unsterblich demo)

== Personnel ==
- Campino - vocals
- Andreas von Holst - guitar
- Michael Breitkopf - guitar
- Andreas Meurer - bass
- Wolfgang Rohde - drums

== Charts ==
=== Weekly charts ===
Chart (1988–89)	Peak position
Austrian Albums (Ö3 Austria)	22
German Albums (Offizielle Top 100)	7
Swiss Albums (Schweizer Hitparade)	7

Chart (2018)	Peak position
German Albums (Offizielle Top 100)	3

=== Year-end charts ===
Chart (1989)	Position
German Albums (Offizielle Top 100)	12
Swiss Albums (Schweizer Hitparade)	21

== Certifications ==
Region	Certification	Certified units/sales
Germany (BVMI)	3× Gold	750,000^{^}
^{^} Shipments figures based on certification alone.
