= Hip Hop Bommi Bop =

Single by Die Toten Hosen featuring Fab Five Freddy
- Released: 1983
- Genre: Rap rock, hip hop, punk rock
- Length: 4:25
- Label: Totenkopf
- Songwriters: Andreas Meurer; Trini Trimpop; Michael Breitkopf; Andreas Frege; Andreas von Holst; Fred Brathwaite

Die Toten Hosen singles chronology
"Bommerlunder/Opel Gang" (1983)	"Hip Hop Bommi Bop" (1983)	"Schöne Bescherung" (1983)

"Hip Hop Bommi Bop" is a parody hip hop version of the Die Toten Hosen song "Eisgekühlter Bommerlunder". The song was born with the cooperation with Fab Five Freddy and is one of the first German hip hop songs.

A remix of the song ("Tap into America-Mix") was released on Auf dem Kreuzzug ins Glück. It features a more aggressive part for Die Toten Hosen. This version was also added to the greatest hits album Reich & sexy.

== Music video ==
The video depicts the band and Fab Five Freddy in a situation, where the band members are cannibalistic natives wearing blackface and Freddy is in their cauldron, being cooked and singing the song.

== Track listing ==
1. "Hip Hop Bommi Bop" (Breitkopf, Frege, von Holst, Meurer, Trimpop/Meurer, Trimpop) − 4:25
2. "Hip Hop Bommi Bop Bop" − 6:47
