= Hier kommt Alex =

1988 single by Die Toten Hosen

Single by Die Toten Hosen

from the album Ein kleines bisschen Horrorschau
- Released: 3 October 1988
- Genre: Punk rock
- Length: 3:53
- Label: Totenkopf
- Songwriters: Andreas Frege; Andreas Meurer

Die Toten Hosen singles chronology
"Alle Mädchen wollen küssen" (1987)	"Hier kommt Alex" (1988)	"1000 gute Gründe" (1989)

"Hier kommt Alex" (Here comes Alex) is a song by German punk band Die Toten Hosen. It is the first single and the first track from the album Ein kleines bisschen Horrorschau. The song in concept introduces Alex, who is the central character on the concept album, a reference to Alex, the protagonist of Anthony Burgess' novel A Clockwork Orange.

"Hier kommt Alex" is structurally and musically similar to the last track from the album, "Bye, Bye Alex".

== Music video ==
The video was directed by Walter Knofel.

== Inclusions in video games ==
The song appears as a bonus track in the game Guitar Hero III: Legends of Rock. It is also available as downloadable content for Guitar Hero World Tour.

It is included in the European release of the game Rock Band, and as a downloadable track on the American version. Due to licensing issues, the song was taken down from DLC services in 2013. The song was available for re-download in Rock Band 4 for those who purchased it prior to this date.

== Cover versions ==
The song has been covered by many artists, among them Samsas Traum on Endstation.Eden, Gatos Sucios on Punto limite, Thomas Baldischwyler for the compilation Pudel Produkte 8, Sonnenbrandt, Scala & Kolacny Brothers on the album Grenzenlos. British punk band UK Subs covered it in English as "Here Comes Alex". In 2020, German medieval rock band Feuerschwanz covered the song with a medieval composition.

Czech rock band Tři sestry covered the song as Já jsem Aleš (I am Aleš).

According to an interview, Die Ärzte had spontaneously played the song on a benefit concert to attract more crowd, because people were leaving after a bad band.

== Track listing ==
1. "Hier kommt Alex" (Meurer/Frege) – 3:53
2. "Achterbahn" (Roller coaster) (Rohde/Frege) − 3:35
3. "Zum Chef (Später Dank)" (To the boss (Later gratitude)) (von Holst/Frege) – 2:10
4. "Jo singt (Das Wort zum Sonntag)" (Jo singt (The word to Sunday)) (von Holst/Frege) – 0:46
5. "Liebeslied" (Love song) (Breitkopf/Frege) – 3:50

== Charts ==
Year	Country	Position
1988	West Germany (GfK)	32

== The Return of Alex ==
"The Return of Alex"

Single by Die Toten Hosen

from the album Love, Peace & Money
- Released: 1994
- Genre: Punk rock
- Length: 4:29
- Label: Virgin Records
- Songwriters: Andreas Frege; Andreas Meurer; Matt Dangerfield

Die Toten Hosen singles chronology
"Kauf MICH!" (1994)	"The Return of Alex" (1994)	"Sexual" (1994)

There's also an English version of the song, titled "The Return of Alex". This was released as a promo single for UK from the all-English album Love, Peace & Money.

=== Music video ===
The video was directed by René Eller and shows the band performing in a black-and-white TV-set.

=== Track listing ===
1. "The Return of Alex" (Meurer/Frege, Dangerfield) − 4:29
2. "So Long - Good Bye" − 3:13 (English version of "Schönen Gruß, auf Wiederseh'n")
3. "I Fought the Law" (Sonny Curtis) − 2:35 (The Crickets cover)

=== In popular culture ===
- Professional darts player Dave Chisnall uses this version for his walk on in PDC European Tour Events.

== 2005 unplugged version ==
"Hier kommt Alex (unplugged)"

Single by Die Toten Hosen

from the album Nur zu Besuch: Unplugged im Wiener Burgtheater
- Released: 9 December 2005
- Genre: Punk rock, acoustic rock
- Length: 4:08
- Label: JKP
- Songwriters: Andreas Frege; Andreas Meurer; Hans Steingen

Die Toten Hosen singles chronology
"Freunde" (2005)	"Hier kommt Alex (unplugged)" (2005)	"The Guns of Brixton (unplugged)" (2006)

"Hier kommt Alex" was also released as a single from the 2005 unplugged album Nur zu Besuch: Unplugged im Wiener Burgtheater. The song is introduced with the first bars of Beethoven's Moonlight Sonata.

=== Music video ===
The video contains live footage.

=== Track listing ===
1. "Hier kommt Alex" (Meurer/Frege) − 4:08
2. "Was zählt" (What counts) (Breitkopf, von Holst/Frege) − 4:04
3. "You'll Never Walk Alone" (Rodgers/Hammerstein) − 2:45

=== Charts ===
Year	Country	Position
2005	Germany (GfK)	46
2005	Austria (Ö3 Austria Top 40)	57
2005	Switzerland (Schweizer Hitparade)	53
