= Schöne Bescherung =

Single by Die Toten Hosen
- Released: 1983
- Genre: Punk rock
- Length: 3:02
- Label: Totenkopf
- Songwriters: Andreas Frege; Michael Breitkopf; Andreas von Holst; Andreas Meurer; Trini Trimpop

Die Toten Hosen singles chronology
"Hip Hop Bommi Bop" (1983)	"Schöne Bescherung" (1983)	"Kriminaltango" (1984)

"Schöne Bescherung" (roughly Happy holidays; lit. Nice gift-giving, also Nice mess) is a single by Die Toten Hosen. In concept, the song is a Christmas greeting.

Another version of the song is available on The Battle of the Bands.

== Track listing ==
1. "Schöne Bescherung" (Breitkopf, Frege, von Holst, Meurer, Trimpop/Frege) − 3:02
2. "Willi's weiße Weihnacht" (Willi's white Christmas) (Breitkopf, Frege, von Holst, Meurer, Trimpop/Frege) − 2:35
3. "Knecht Ruprechts letzte Fahrt" (Knecht Ruprecht's last ride) (Breitkopf, Frege, von Holst, Meurer, Trimpop/Frege) − 3:46
