= Damenwahl =

Studio album by Die Toten Hosen
- Released: 1986; 2007 (jubilee edition)
- Recorded: 1985
- Genre: Punk rock
- Length: 41:29; 78:36 (re-release)
- Label: Virgin Records
- Producer: Jon Caffery

Die Toten Hosen chronology
The Battle of the Bands (1985)	Damenwahl (1986)	Never Mind the Hosen, Here's Die Roten Rosen (1987)

Singles from Damenwahl
- 1. "Das Altbierlied" Released: 6 October 1986

Damenwahl (translation Ladies' choice, a dance term to indicate it is ladies' turn to choose partners) is the third studio album of the German punk band Die Toten Hosen. The term "Damenwahl" appears in "Verflucht, verdammt, gebrandmarkt" and the intro of "Altbierlied". It is regarded by some as the weakest album by DTH.

"Bis zum bitteren Ende" is originally from Opel-Gang, here sung a cappella. "Schwarzwaldklinik" is based on and titled after popular German TV series The Black Forest Clinic. "Wort zum Sonntag" is a punk anthem titled after a couple of German church TV shows and a tribute to Johnny Thunders. It features a line "Solange Johnny Thunders lebt, solange bleib ich ein Punk" (As long as Johnny Thunders lives, I'll stay punk). After his death the band didn't perform this song for a long time; later they used another line: "Hey Johnny, kannst du uns grad sehen? Wir vergessen dich nicht. Wir werden überall von dir erzählen, damit dein Name ewig weiterlebt" (Hey Johnny, can you see us right now? We won't forget you. We will talk about you everywhere, so your name could live forever). "Agent X" the first English-language song that the band released on a studio album.

== Track listing ==
1. "Sojus nerushimai republic swobodnich" − 0:25 (A Russian language introduction over the National Anthem of the Soviet Union)
2. "Disco in Moskau" (Disco in Moscow) (Phil Ram/Ram/Translation: Frege) − 3:50 (The Vibrators cover, in German)
3. "Verschwende deine Zeit" (Waste your time) (Frege/Frege) − 2:59
4. "Freitag der 13." (Friday the 13th) (Rohde/Frege) − 3:47
5. "Bis zum bitteren Ende" (Till the bitter end) (Frege/Frege) − 2:03
6. "Schwarzwaldklinik" (Black Forest Clinic) (Breitkopf/Frege) − 3:08
7. "Wort zum Sonntag" (Word to Sunday) (von Holst/Frege) − 4:27
8. "Ehrenmann" (Gentleman) (von Holst/Frege) − 3:33
9. "Helmstedt Blues" (Rohde) − 0:21
10. "Großalarm" (Red alert) (Breitkopf/Frege) − 3:35
11. "Spielzeugland" (Toy land) (Meurer/Frege) − 2:47
12. "Verflucht, verdammt, gebrandmarkt" (Accursed, condemned, branded) (Meurer/Frege) − 3:37
13. "Agent X" (Rohde/Frege) − 3:42
14. "Das Altbierlied" (The Altbier song) (Lonsdorfer) − 3:15 (Hans Ludwig Lonsdorfer cover)

=== 2007 remastered anniversary edition bonus tracks ===
15. "Übung macht den Meister" (Practice makes perfect) (von Holst/Frege) – 1:59 (from "Das Altbier Lied")
16. "Zapfenstreich" (Tattoo) (von Holst, Frege/Frege, von Holst) – 3:22 (Damenwahl demo)
17. "Disco in Moscow" (Ram, Wyatt/Wyatt, Ram) – 3:09 (original English version of "Disco in Moskau", The Vibrators cover; Damenwahl demo)
18. "Spielzeugland" – 2:57 (Damenwahl demo)
19. "Bombenstimmung" (roughly Terrific atmosphere) (Breitkopf/Frege) – 2:54 (Damenwahl demo)
20. "Großalarm" – 3:54 (Damenwahl demo)
21. "Nur im Traum" (Only in a dream) (von Holst/Frege) – 2:39 (Damenwahl demo)
22. "Schwarzwaldklinik" – 3:36 (Damenwahl demo)
23. "Das kleine ABC" (The little ABC) (von Holst/Frege) – 3:34 (Kauf MICH! demo)
24. "Aufgeben (gilt nicht)" (Giving up (is not a choice)) (Frege/Frege) – 5:01 (Kauf MICH! demo)
25. "Gipfelstürmer" (Summiteer) (Meurer/Frege) – 3:45 (Kauf MICH! demo)

== Singles ==
- 1986: "Das Altbier Lied"

== Personnel ==
- Campino - vocals
- Andreas von Holst - guitar
- Michael Breitkopf - guitar
- Andreas Meurer - bass
- Wolfgang Rohde - drums, harmonica

== Charts ==
Chart performance for Damenwahl
Chart (2021)	Peak position
German Albums (Offizielle Top 100)	2
Swiss Albums (Schweizer Hitparade)	20

== Certifications ==
Region	Certification	Certified units/sales
Germany (BVMI)	Gold	250,000^{^}
^{^} Shipments figures based on certification alone.
