= Die Toten Hosen =

German punk rock band

Background information
- Also known as: Die Roten Rosen; Die Flinger Domspatzen; Die Gewissen Extras; Die Pebbles; The Evil Kids; Gebrüder Edelweiss; The Incredible T. H. Scratchers; Little Pepito and the Swinging Pesetas; Ricky Curl and the Standing Ovations; Tango Bros.; Tangobrüder; Los Pantalones Muertes
- Origin: Düsseldorf, Germany
- Genre: Punk rock
- Years active: 1982–present
- Labels: JKP; Charisma (US)
- Members: Campino (Andreas Frege); Breiti (Michael Breitkopf); Kuddel (Andreas von Holst); Andi (Andreas Meurer); Vom (Stephen George Ritchie)
- Past members: Walter November (Walter Hartung; 1982–1983); Trini Trimpop (Klaus-Dieter Trimpop; 1982–1985); Jakob Keusen (1985–1986); Wölli (Wolfgang Rohde; 1986–1999)
- Website: dietotenhosen.de

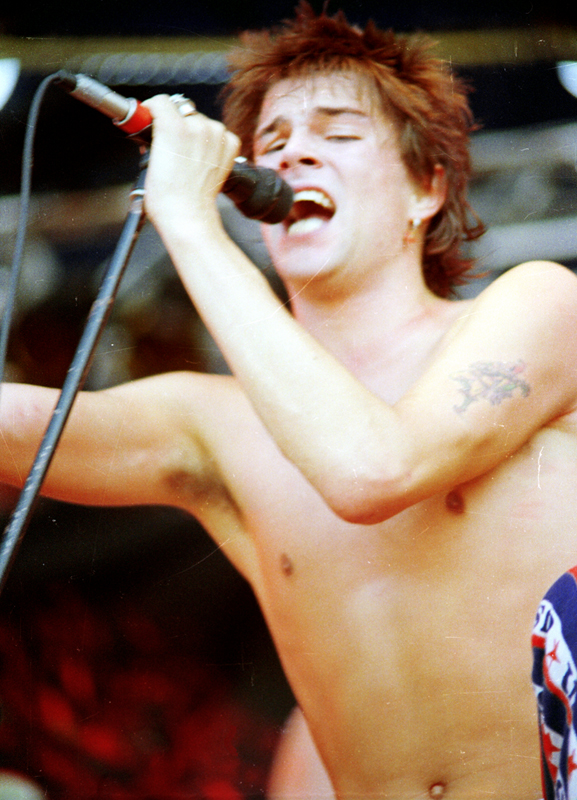
Andreas Frege (Campino) 1987

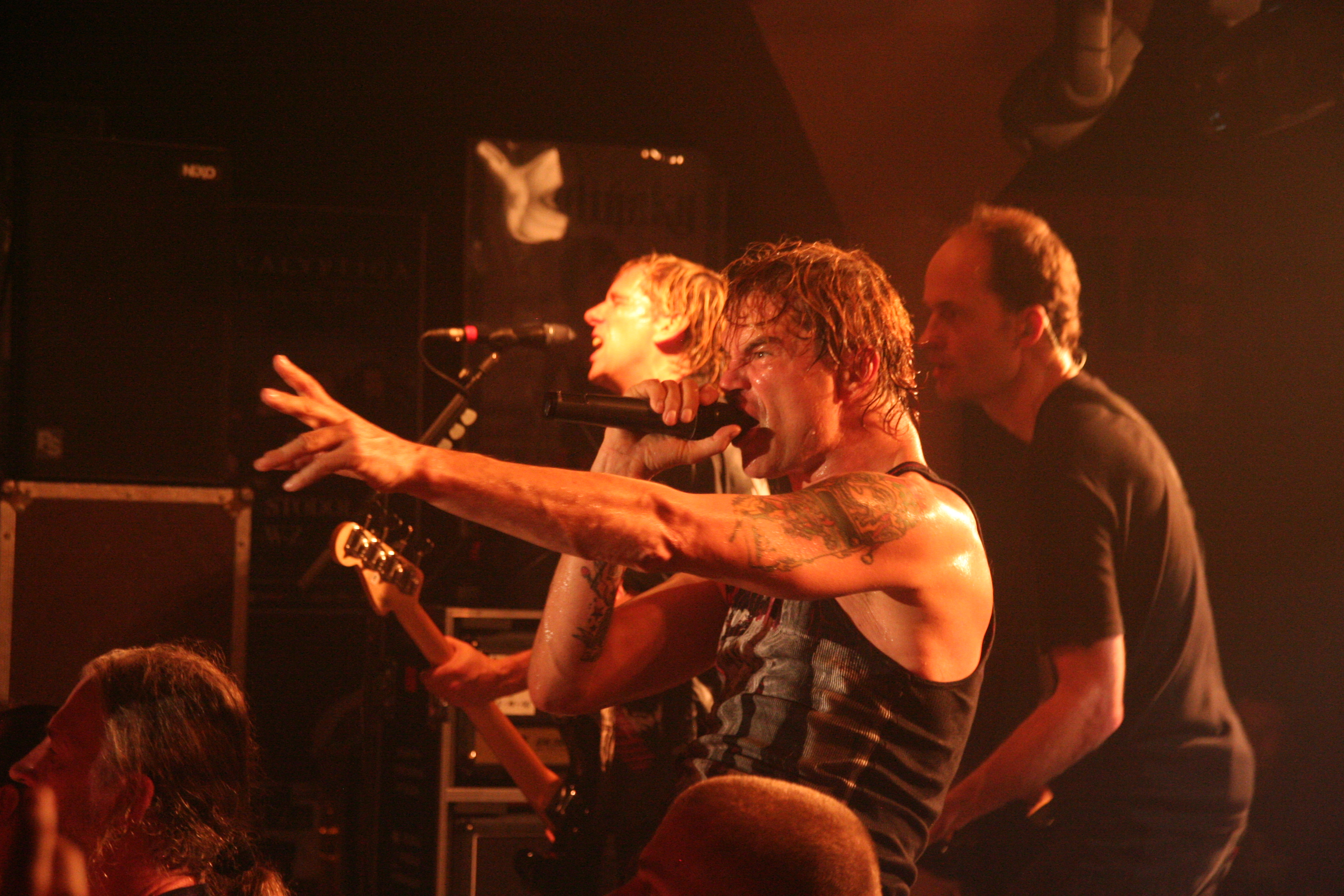
Campino in Wrocław, October 2010

Die Toten Hosen are a German punk rock band from Düsseldorf. The name is taken from the German slang idiom tote Hose (literally "dead trousers"), which means "nothing happening"; "boring". The band has had an important success through the years, and it has built a loyal following both in Europe and South America, being particularly popular in their home country and in Argentina.

== History ==
The current members of Die Toten Hosen are Campino (Andreas Frege), Kuddel (Andreas von Holst), Vom (Stephen Ritchie), Andi (Andreas Meurer) and Breiti (Michael Breitkopf). All members except one, Vom, who is English, are German, though Campino's mother, Jenny, was also English. Vom joined in 1999, after previous drummer Wölli sustained injuries in a car crash. Wölli had played from 1985 to 1999 and was an honorary member of the band until his death in 2016. The drummer until 1985 was Trini Trimpop, who became the band's manager when Wölli joined.

The band is reputed to have played for free at private birthday parties or similar events in their early years, so long as the host provided them with unlimited beer and covered all damage caused by the band.

=== 1982–1987 ===
Die Toten Hosen formed in 1982 at the Ratinger Hof, a Düsseldorf bar frequented by punk musicians. Its founder members were Campino and Andreas von Holst, both from local punk band ZK, with Andreas Meurer, Michael Breitkopf, Trini Trimpop and Walter November. According to their friend and one time promoter Andrea Berzen, they chose the name Die toten Hosen – which literally translates as "the dead trousers" but suggests the German idiom tote Hose, meaning "nothing going on", "it's boring" (Note: It is also used to paraphrase impotence or lack of sexual activity, cf. de:Tote Hose.) – over Die Pariser. (Note: Die Pariser means both the Parisians and, as a slang term, "the condoms.") According to Andrea Berzen, Campino preferred the former because it implied that their concerts might not be sold out, but there might be "tote Hose" on the nights.

At their first concert at the Bremer Schlachthof over Easter 1982, the compère mistakenly introduced them as Die Toten Hasen (The Dead Hares). The debut single "Wir sind bereit" ("We are ready") was released in 1982, and was followed by their first album, Opel-Gang, the next year.

Guitarist Walter November left the band in November 1983 due to his drug problems. One of the two A sides of the third single was the drinking song "Eisgekühlter Bommerlunder" ("ice-cold Bommerlunder" schnapps), which received considerable radio airplay and increased their fan base. The band released their first album titled Opel-Gang in early 1983 on their own label Totenkopf (skull).

In July 1983, the band signed to EMI, who financed a video for "Eisgekühlter Bommerlunder", directed by Wolfgang Büld. It depicts a chaotic wedding ceremony in a small Bavarian church, with Kurt Raab playing an alcoholic priest and Marianne Sägebrecht playing the bride. After the filming the congregation called for the church to be reconsecrated. German public television refused to screen the video for several years for fear of offending churchgoers.

At the end of 1983, they released "Hip Hop Bommi Bop", a hip-hop version of "Eisgekühlter Bommerlunder", featuring New York rapper Fab Five Freddy.

In 1984, the band played a session on the BBC's John Peel Show. EMI were displeased with the band's high travel costs and by Norbert Hähnel publicly parodying their million-selling artist Heino at a Toten Hosen concert. Heino successfully obtained a court order to cease and desist. Die Toten Hosen left EMI and signed to Virgin Records. Their second album Unter Falscher Flagge (Under False Colours), was released in 1984. The title explained the front cover of the LP, which carried a picture of the band members dressed as pirates aboard a ship. The original back cover featured the skeleton of a dog sitting in front of a gramophone, a caricature of the His Master's Voice entertainment trademark. Legal action by EMI (who owned the rights to His Master's Voice in Europe at the time) prompted the album cover to be changed to the skeleton of an eagle, which, along with the Jolly Roger, became a band logo.

In Spring 1985, the band toured France for the Goethe Institute and in Autumn they travelled to Hungary and Poland. In late 1985, Trini Trimpop moved from drumming for the band into their management, where he worked until 1992. Jakob Keusen briefly replaced him as the band's drummer before Wolfgang Rohde (Wölli) took over in January 1986. Rohde's first concert was also the band's first concert in front of a very large audience. Along with Herbert Grönemeyer, Udo Lindenberg, Marius Müller-Westernhagen, BAP, the Rodgau Monotones and many others, they performed at the Anti-WAAhnsinns-Festival in July 1986 to protest the construction of the nearby Nuclear reprocessing plant Wackersdorf.

In 1986, they recorded their third album, Damenwahl (Ladies' Choice). The Damenwahl tour was sponsored by the northern German condom manufacturer Fromms, who arranged for free samples to be scattered amongst the crowd. In 1987, the band celebrated its first chart success with the record Never Mind the Hosen, Here's Die Roten Rosen (Never mind the Trousers – Here's the Red Roses) using the pseudonym Die Roten Rosen (The Red Roses). The album contains rock versions of German 1960s pop songs. The name and cover art of the record are a parody of Never Mind the Bollocks, Here's the Sex Pistols by the Sex Pistols (1977).

In late 1987, Die Toten Hosen released their first live album Bis zum bitteren Ende (Till the Bitter End). It charted in the German and Austrian Top 30.

=== 1988 to 1995: Recognition and early success ===
In 1988, the band released their commercial breakthrough, the album Ein kleines bisschen Horrorschau (A little bit of horrorshow). The album referenced the Anthony Burgess's novel A Clockwork Orange and Stanley Kubrick's film of the same name and was largely written for Bernd Schadewald's theatre adaption of A Clockwork Orange. For half a year the band played on stage at the Kammerspiele Bad Godesberg theatre in Bonn, alongside Ralf Richter, the play's lead actor. In September 1988, Die Toten Hosen performed at the Lituanika Festival in Vilnius and Kaunas, Lithuania. They were chosen by the jury as the best band of the event. The album included "Hier kommt Alex" ("Here comes Alex") was later re-recorded in an unplugged version in 2005, incorporating the opening piano phrase of Beethoven's Moonlight Sonata.

Their spring tour in 1989 included a sell-out performance at the huge Westfalenhallen in Dortmund. The band released 3 Akkorde für ein Halleluja (3 Chords for a Hallelujah), a video documentary of their lives. In 1990, the Toten Hosen were invited to attend the New Music Seminar in New York and performed as support for The Rolling Stones in Cologne. That summer the band travelled to Italy to report on the FIFA World Cup for various newspapers and radio stations. For this purpose they recorded a rock cover version of "Azzurro" by Adriano Celentano, accompanied by a video satirising the behaviour of German football fans when abroad. The double album Kreuzzug ins Glück (Crusade to happiness) was released in 1990 and sold over 150,000 copies in its first week.

In 1991 the Toten Hosen released their album Learning English Lesson One, a tribute to the band's musical influences, consisting mainly of cover versions of English punk rock classics, including 'Dirty Pictures' by Radio Stars. Each track featured at least one member of the original band that had recorded it. Several songs were recorded in Rio de Janeiro with Great Train Robber Ronald Biggs. The album also marked the beginning of the band's collaboration with T.V. Smith, songwriter and lead singer of The Adverts, which continues to the present day.

The band's 1992 'Menschen, Tiere, Sensationen' (People, Animals, Sensations) tour included concerts in Germany, Austria, Switzerland, Denmark, Great Britain, Spain, France and a their first ever dates in Argentina. The single "Sascha … ein aufrechter Deutscher" ("Sascha... an upstanding German") was released for Christmas 1992 as a vehement condemnation of right-wing radicalism. The proceeds of this song were donated to an anti-racist charity campaign in Düsseldorf. The right-wing Republikaner party failed in its attempt to have the song banned for defamation and thereby unintentionally contributed to the success of the single. The song grossed half a million Deutsche Mark.

In 1993, the album Kauf MICH! (Buy ME!) was released and reached number one in the German charts. Its songs express opinions on consumerism, advertisement and right-wing extremism. In the summer of 1993 Die Toten Hosen performed as the supporting act for U2 on their Zoo TV tour in Germany, with audiences of over 50,000 people at each concert. The video to the song "Kauf MICH!" showed footage of these concerts. In the same year, the band released Reich & Sexy (Rich & Sexy), their first best-of album. On the cover the members of the band are naked, portraying pretentious millionaires from the music industry surrounded by nude women. An international version of the best-of album was released in 1994 called Love, Peace & Money. For a period, Die Toten Hosen had three albums in the German charts at the same time.

In 1994 the band was on the road for almost the entire year in Germany and neighbouring countries. In November they gave four concerts in the US and in Canada as support act for Green Day. Starting in April 1995, the Toten Hosen got their own radio program on Fritz radio in Berlin, called Tausend Takte Tanzmusik ("a thousand beats of dance music"). The show aired every Sunday from 7 to 8 p.m. for a year. At the end of the year the band founded their own record label JKP.

=== 1996 to 2020: JKP – beginnings with their own label ===
The first album under their own label was Opium fürs Volk (opium for the people), released in 1996. Its songs deal with faith and religion. The album went platinum, their third record to do so, after Kauf MICH! and Reich und sexy. The single "Zehn kleine Jägermeister" (ten little master huntsmen or rather: ten little Jägermeisters) went to number one of the German-speaking singles charts. Die Toten Hosen and Iggy Pop were a supporting act at the Ramones farewell concert in the River-Plate-Stadion of Buenos Aires in front of 75,000 people. An extended tour followed under the slogan "Ewig währt am längsten" (Eternity lasts longest) through Germany, Austria and Switzerland. Furthermore, they performed at the Gurtenfestival, the Forestglade Festival, the Berlin Waldbühne and at the Bizarre Festival in Cologne. In May 1996 they headlined the Rock am Ring festival. In the same year the band released their second live album Im Auftrag des Herrn (on the Lord's behalf).

Their 1000th concert was on 28 June 1997 in the Düsseldorfer Rheinstadium, and was attended by over 60,000 fans. Lack of effective crowd control resulted in a crowd collapse which injured a reported 70 people, and caused the death of Rieke Lax, a 16 year old Dutch girl. The band later released the song "Alles ist eins" (Everything is one) in her memory.

The 1998 Warped Tour took in New Zealand, Australia, Japan and Hawaii. Campino was twice hospitalised after concerts in Byron Bay and Geelong in Australia.

Die Toten Hosen have collaborated with numerous other musicians (like Bad Religion, AC/DC, U2, Rolling Stones); they are also one of the few German punk bands popular outside Germany, with a large following in South America, Australia and Eastern Europe.

The band's members are passionate fans of their local football team, Fortuna Düsseldorf, which they sponsored from 2001 to 2003. When a goal is scored at the club's ground, the Esprit Arena, the chorus of the band's song "Strom" is played. The band released a football-themed song named "Bayern" in 2000 in which they proclaim that they would not join Bayern Munich under any circumstances. Campino mentioned that the band lost significant CD sales in southern Germany after the release of the song.

In August 2006, Campino starred as Mack the Knife in Brecht's The Threepenny Opera at Berlin's Admiralspalast, a short distance from the theatre where the play premiered in 1928. The director, famous actor Klaus Maria Brandauer, was criticised for the play's unadventurous staging, but Campino was cheered by the audience.

Artist Andreas Gursky produced Tote Hosen, a blown up photograph of the crowd from a Die Toten Hosen concert, depicting youths excitedly cheering for the band, many wearing the red Hosen shirt. It is in the collection of the Museum of Modern Art.

Faith No More bassist Billy Gould wore a Toten Hosen tee shirt on the cover of their greatest hits album, Midlife Crisis: The Very Best of Faith No More. Faith No More have covered the Toten Hosen song "Hofgarten" in live shows.

German rock group Samsas Traum covered "Hier kommt Alex" with a more gothic sound. Lead singer Alexander Kaschte changes the final lyric to "Hey! Ich bin Alex!" (Hey! I am Alex!) as a wry joke. British punk band UK Subs recorded an English-language cover of the song on their 1993 album Normal Service Resumed. '"Hier kommt Alex" is featured in video games Guitar Hero III: Legends of Rock and Rock Band (European version). The song was also released as a downloadable track on the American version of Rock Band on 27 May 2008. Die Toten Hosen also have a special edition of SingStar for PlayStation 2, devoted exclusively to the band, featuring 24 tracks and videos from over the decades, which was released in 2007.

MC Frontalot, in collaboration with faux-German electronic musician KOMPRESSOR on the track "Rappers We Crush", rhymes "What did I do to deserve this?/What was my crime?/Was it because I sampled Die Toten Hosen that one time?"

In 2002 and 2005, the band played at Przystanek Woodstock, the biggest open air festival in Europe. In 2010, the band played several dates in Central Asia and became the first foreign rock band to perform in Tajikistan since 1991. The band was criticised for accepting €68,000 of German government funding towards this tour. On 2 October 2010, the band played in Amman, Jordan, their first concert in the Middle East.

In 2012, Die Toten Hosen released their album Ballast der Republik. A special edition includes a bonus CD with cover versions of songs that influenced the band. On 26 April 2016, it was announced that former drummer Wolfgang Rohde had died of cancer.

In early 2018, members of Die Toten Hosen recorded backing vocals on Australian band The Living End's eighth studio album, Wunderbar, which was recorded in Germany.

On November 27, 2020, the single "You're No Good" was issued online.

== Musical style ==
All band members are self-taught musicians. At the beginning of their musical career most of them were still at school. Their first album was recorded in a studio rented by the hour. The band kept to simple guitar chords and lyrics, in garage style. Die Toten Hosen were mainly influenced by punk bands from the 1970s, to whom they frequently pay tribute in recorded work and live performances. On occasion they have played songs by the Beatles and the Rolling Stones. Some of the band's songs have been described as "Schunkelpunk", a fusion of German schlager music and punk, exemplified by "Eisgekühlter Bommerlunder", numerous cover versions of German schlager songs and tracks such as "Azzurro". They can be seen as pioneers of "Volxmusic", which combines elements of German folk music with jazz, hip-hop or rock. In some of their songs Die Toten Hosen experiment with strings or wind instruments. A few songs have elements that are lifted from jazz (e.g. "Warum werde ich nicht satt"), reggae ("Zehn kleine Jägermeister") or Yugoslavian gypsy music ("Das Mädchen aus Rottweil").

For the most part, The Toten Hosen have not departed substantially from their original style of music, choosing power chords, straightforward lyrics, simple melodies and anthem-like choruses over long instrumental solos. Other influences on the music of Die Toten Hosen include hardcore punk, punk blues, heavy metal, thrash metal, and hard rock.

The focus of the band's music has gradually shifted from funny and nonsensical to serious. The songs from the band's first LP were mostly about having fun, but by the end of the 1980s they were focusing more on political and social issues such as racism.

== Members ==
- Campino (Andreas Frege) - vocals (1982–present)
- Breiti (Michael Breitkopf) - guitars (1982–present)
- Kuddel (Andreas von Holst) - guitars (1982–present)
- Andi (Andreas Meurer) - bass (1982–present)
- Vom (Stephen George Ritchie) - drums (1999–present)

=== Former members ===
- Walter November (Walter Hartung) - guitars (1982–1983)
- Trini Trimpop (Klaus-Dieter Trimpop) - drums (1982–1985)
- Jakob Keusen - drums (1985–1986)
- Wölli (Wolfgang Rohde) - drums (1986–1999)

== Discography ==
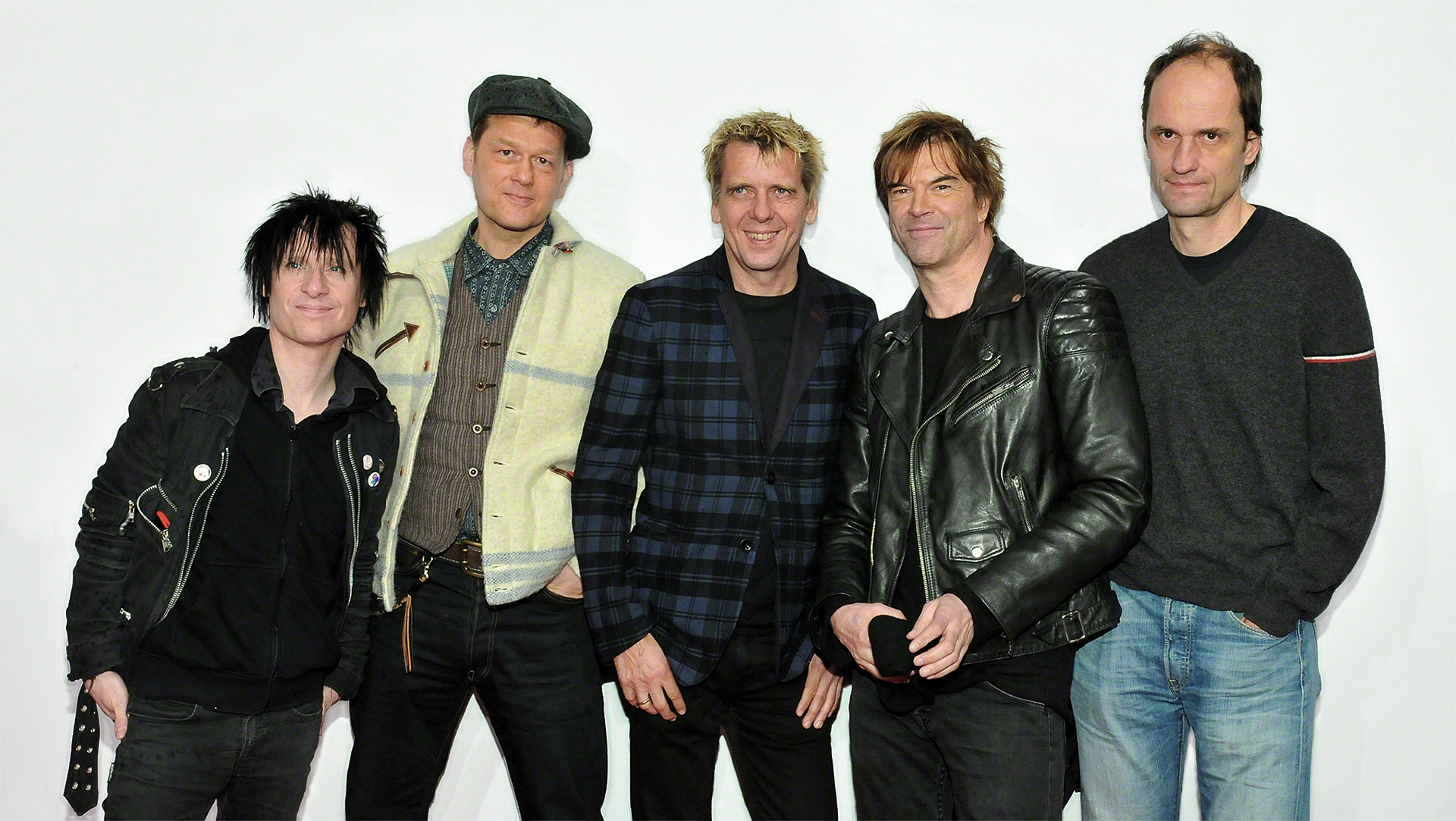
Ritchie, Andreas von Holst, Andreas Meurer, Campino and Michael Breitkopf (2013)

- 1983: Opel-Gang
- 1984: Unter falscher Flagge
- 1986: Damenwahl
- 1987: Never Mind the Hosen, Here's Die Roten Rosen
- 1988: Ein kleines bisschen Horrorschau
- 1990: Auf dem Kreuzzug ins Glück
- 1991: Learning English Lesson 1
- 1993: Kauf MICH!
- 1996: Opium fürs Volk
- 1998: Wir warten auf's Christkind...
- 1999: Unsterblich
- 2002: Auswärtsspiel
- 2004: Zurück zum Glück
- 2008: In aller Stille
- 2012: Ballast der Republik
- 2012: Tage wie diese
- 2017: Laune der Natur
- 2017: Learning English Lesson 2
- 2026: Trink aus, wir müssen gehen

== Social involvement ==
=== Political activities ===
The band openly support political and social organizations in their music, interviews and by donations, but are not affiliated with any political party. They turned down a request from Germany's SPD (Social Democratic Party) to write a song for their European election campaign in 1994.

In 1991, their track "Fünf vor Zwölf" ("It is high time") was published on the sampler Nazis raus (Nazis get out) and in 2006 they supported the band ZSK's Kein Bock auf Nazis (can't stand Nazis) campaign. In 1992, the band participated in a demonstration against xenophobia in Bonn. They performed together with Herbert Grönemeyer, Nina Hagen and others for nearly 200,000 demonstrators. In 1995 they supported Greenpeace, IPPNW, Aktion Atomteststop (an initiative for a nuclear test ban), the BUND (German Friends of the Earth chapter) and they were featured on the track "Tout Pour Sauver L'Amour" ("Everything to save love") on the Stop Chirac compilation album.

In 2002, the band attracted publicity by posing undressed for posters of the animal rights group PETA under the slogan 'Lieber nackt als im Pelz' (Better naked than in fur). in 2005 they funded On the Run, a compilation album to raise funds for immigrants' rights organisation Pro Asyl, and contributed the song "Meine Stadt" ("My town").

From 1999 to 2004 their web site had a public discussion forum but this was terminated without explanation.

=== Ties to Düsseldorf ===
Over the course of the band's history, Die Toten Hosen have expressed their loyalty to their home town in various ways. In summer 1995, the band staged an ice hockey game called Powerplay des Wahnsinns (Power-play of insanity), playing in a team alongside professional players from Düsseldorfer EG against a team composed of Finnish rock band Leningrad Cowboys and Finnish national ice hockey players. The match took place in the stadium at the Brehmstrasse in Düsseldorf. Their team Knochenbrecher Düsseldorf (Düsseldorf Bonebreakers) lost 9:10. In 1996 they slipped into women's clothing, silk stockings and high heels and took part in the Düsseldorf Mardi Gras parade with their own float under the slogan "We bury good taste".

Die Toten Hosen are supporters of the football club Fortuna Düsseldorf. At the end of the 1980s, they helped the club by donating 200,000 DM towards signing the player Anthony Baffoe. From 2001 to 2003, they sponsored the club after it had experienced major financial difficulties. In 2002, the band signed an advertising contract with the Diebels Brewery, and donated the proceeds to the club's "Nachwuchs" (youth side), who wear the band's skull emblem on their shirts.

Die Toten Hosen have reserved space for 17 people at Düsseldorf's Südfriedhof cemetery, where they wish to be buried.
