= Campino (singer) =

German singer

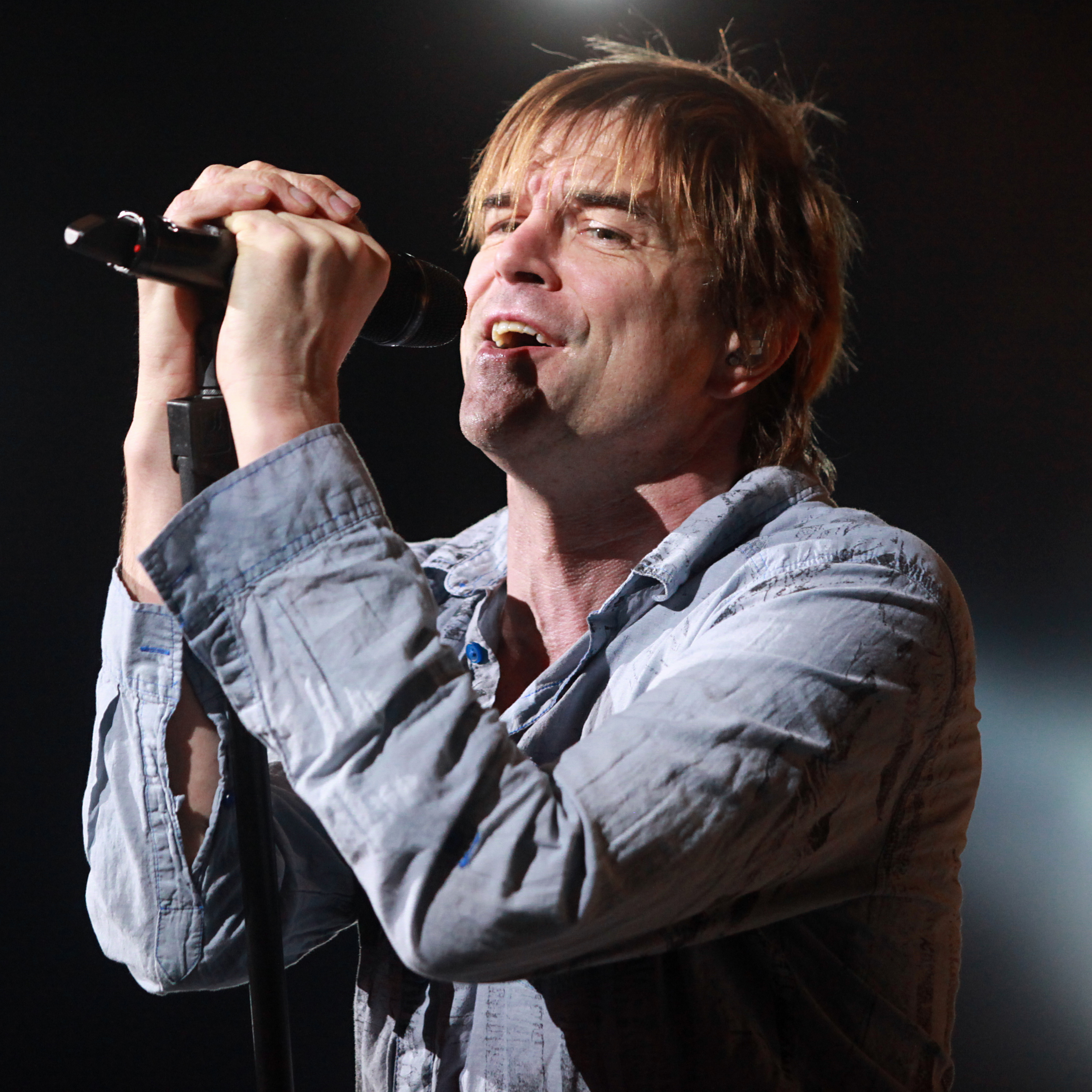

Background information
- Born: Andreas Frege; 22 June 1962 (age 64); Düsseldorf, West Germany
- Genres: Punk rock; hard rock; heavy metal
- Occupations: Singer; songwriter; actor
- Years active: 1978–present

Andreas Frege (born 22 June 1962), known professionally as Campino, is a German-British singer, best known as the lead vocalist of Die Toten Hosen, a German punk rock band.

== Biography ==
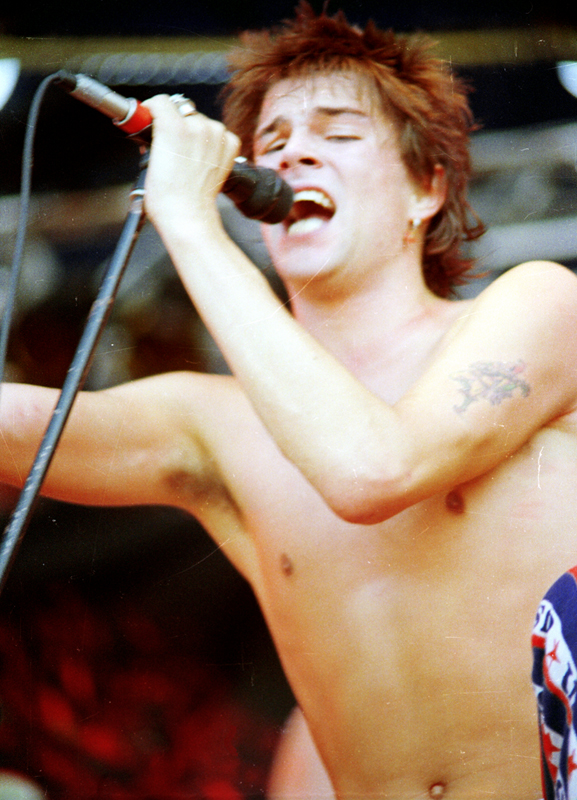
Campino in 1987

Campino was born on 22 June in Düsseldorf and is a descendant of the Frege family who owned the Fregehaus (Frege House) in Leipzig. His grandfather Ludwig Frege was the president of the Federal Administrative Court of Germany. He grew up as the son of a judge and a teacher. His mother was English, and raised her children to be bilingual. He has five siblings including his older brother John, who introduced him to punk rock. His grandfather John Edmondson Whittaker was a Labour Party politician and Member of Parliament for Heywood and Radcliffe.

At the age of two he moved with his parents to Mettmann, near Düsseldorf, Germany. Campino went to the Humboldt-Gymnasium secondary school in Düsseldorf. He had to repeat two school years, which put him in a class with Michael Breitkopf, with whom he founded Die Toten Hosen. Both finished secondary school in 1983. Campino did eight months military service in the Bundeswehr while his application for recognition as a conscientious objector was being processed, after which he was transferred to alternative civilian service within a psychiatric ward in Düsseldorf, together with friend Michael Breitkopf. From 1978 to 1982 he was the singer for the band ZK, and later founded Die Toten Hosen with Andreas von Holst, Michael Breitkopf, Andreas Meurer, Trini Trimpop and Walter November. In their early years Die Toten Hosen are said to have played at small gatherings for just a crate of beer.

He and the other band members are fans of football club Fortuna Düsseldorf. The band sponsored the team between 2001 and 2003. Campino also follows Liverpool F.C. and once broke his foot when kicking a garbage can in frustration at a Liverpool loss. The band frequently sponsor social projects, which have included helping kids with homework, campaigning against racism in sport and helping asylum seekers afford legal representation. Campino has a son with German actress Karina Krawczyk.

== Media appearances and acting ==
Campino has a high media presence, both as spokesman of Die Toten Hosen and as an individual. He has appeared on numerous television talk shows since the mid-1980s, commenting on a wide variety of social and religious issues. NDR television made a documentary of his life and beliefs that they screened within their weekly 'Gott und die Welt' (God and the world) show in 2001.

Campino has acted as a journalist on several occasions. In 1994 German magazine Der Spiegel printed his interview with then Youth Minister Angela Merkel in which he asked her about her experiences with drugs, alcohol and pop music. In 1993 he asked Paul McCartney similar questions. He interviewed Joe Strummer, singer of The Clash for SZ magazine in August 2001, one year before Strummer died.

Campino has performed as an actor on several occasions. In 1986 he played a significant role in the movie Losers by Bernd Schadewald and in 1990, he played a punk in the early evening television serial Der Fahnder. In 1992, he played the lead role in the comedy Langer Samstag by Hanns Christian Müller, alongside Gisela Schneeberger, Dieter Pfaff, Ottfried Fischer, Jochen Busse and others.

Apart from a small role in the play A Clockwork Orange in Bad Godesberg in May 1998 for which Die Toten Hosen also wrote the soundtrack, he had his theatre debut playing the role of Mack the Knife in Bertolt Brecht's "Dreigroschenoper" (engl. 'The Beggar's Opera') from August to October 2006, with Gottfried John, Katrin Sass, Birgit Minichmayr and Maria Happel. The play was directed by Klaus Maria Brandauer and staged at the Admiralspalast (engl. 'admiral's palace') theatre in Berlin.

Campino was voted one of the 100 most significant Germans in an audience poll (Unsere Besten) by ZDF German TV in 2003. He was ranked 65th of the 300 people nominated. In 2006 he presented an Echo music award for extraordinary achievements to Bob Geldof on behalf of the German recorded music industry.

Campino has supported the Regine Hildebrandt School in Birkenwerder since December 2006 with special emphasis on campaigns against racism.

He played the lead role in Wim Wenders' movie Palermo Shooting (2008), which premiered in Germany on 20 November 2008.

== Guest appearances ==
Campino sang without Die Toten Hosen on:

- Wild Times Again album by The Lurkers (1988)
- "Caramba, Carajo ein Whisky" on the Bajo otra bandera album by Pilsen (1993)
- "Thinking of You", "Song for Me" and "Marlene" on the album Honest John Plain & Friends by Honest John Plain & Friends (1996)
- Power Cut album by The Boys (1997)
- "Raise Your Voice!" single by Bad Religion (1998)
- "Viva la Revolution" on the En vivo y ruidoso II album by Los Violadores (2003)
- "Paul ist tot" on the 26 1/2 album by Fehlfarben (2006)
- "Smiling Through the Tears" on the A Foot Full of Bullets album by Peter and the Test Tube Babies (2006)
- "Bandera de Manos" on the La Vida... Es Un Ratico album by Juanes (2007)
- "Do Anything You Wanna Do" on the Crisis album by Motorama (2009)
- "City of the Dead" on the Los Contrarios album by Desorden Público (2011)
- "Alles nochmal von vorn" single by Wölli & Die Band des Jahres (2011)
- "Die Nacht ist mit mir" on the Zum Glück in die Zukunft II album by Marteria (2014)
- "Victory or Death (We Gave 'em Hell)" on the album Lies They Tell Our Children by Anti-Flag (2023)
