= List of number-one hits of 1970 (Argentina) =

This is a list of the songs that reached number one in Argentina in 1970, according to Billboard magazine with data provided by Rubén Machado's "Escalera a la fama".

Issue date	Song	Artist(s)
February 7	"Balada para un loco"	Amelita Baltar/Roberto Goyeneche/ Los Walkers
February 14	"Balada para un loco"	Amelita Baltar/Roberto Goyeneche/ Los Walkers
March 21	"Es preferible"	Peret/Safari/Bobby Capone/ Romeo
March 28	"Wonderful World, Beautiful People"	Jimmy Cliff
April 25	"El arca de Noé"	Sergio Endrigo/Jimmy Fontana/ Iva Zanicchi
May 2	"El arca de Noé"	Sergio Endrigo/Jimmy Fontana/ Iva Zanicchi
May 9	"El arca de Noé"	Sergio Endrigo/Jimmy Fontana/ Iva Zanicchi
May 16	"El arca de Noé"	Sergio Endrigo/Jimmy Fontana/ Iva Zanicchi
May 23	"El arca de Noé"	Sergio Endrigo/Jimmy Fontana/ Iva Zanicchi
June 27	"Raindrops Keep Fallin' on My Head"	Johnny Mathis/Sam Shay/ BJ Thomas/Tony Roberts
July 18	"Cecilia"	Simon & Garfunkel
August 8	"Cecilia"	Simon & Garfunkel
August 29	"In the Summertime"	Mungo Jerry/Idle Race
September 12	"In the Summertime"	Mungo Jerry/Idle Race
September 26	"Yellow River"	Christie/Bob Christian/ The Tremeloes
November 14	"Soolaimon"	Neil Diamond/Malcolm And The Les Humphries Singers/ Georgette y José
December 12	"Las cosas que me alejan de ti"	Héctor Cabrera/Gian Franco Pagliaro

== See also ==
- 1970 in music
