= Sufferin' in the Land =

Song by Jimmy Cliff

from the album Wonderful World, Beautiful People
- A-side: "Sufferin' in the Land"
- B-side: "Come Into My Life"
- Released: 1970
- Label: Island 6014 009
- Composer: J. Cliff
- Producer: Leslie Kong

"Sufferin' in the Land" was a 1970 single for Jimmy Cliff. It made the charts in the Netherlands that year. It was also covered by several artists shortly after its release.

== Background ==
"Sufferin' in the Land" backed with "Come into My Life" was released in the Netherlands by Island Records in 1970. It was produced by Leslie Kong and appears on the Jimmy Cliff album and later version of the album, Wonderful World, Beautiful People.

== Charts ==
It made its debut in the Dutch charts on May 30, 1970. It reached its peak position at no. 26 that week, spending a total of two weeks on the chart.

== Other versions ==
US singer Chuck Bennett recorded a version of the song in German. Released as "Wann Wird Die Menschheit Klug?", it was a minor hit for him in Germany in 1970.

Brazilian band The Fevers recorded a version ("Sinto, Mas Não Sei Dizer") which appeared on their 1970 EP, Sinto Mas Não Sei Dizer.

German singer, Tony aka Tony Oberdörffer recorded a version ("Reise ins Märchenland") which appeared on the B side of his single, "Nuevo Laredo" which was released in 1970.

Former member of the disco band Ebony, Jannette Kania also recorded a version that was produced by Jürgen Hofius. It was released in 1978.
