= Gitta Walther =

German singer (1940–2014)

- Also known as: Jackie Robinson, Simone
- Born: 14 June 1940
- Origin: Annaberg-Buchholz, East Germany
- Died: 10 October 2014 (aged 74)
- Occupation: Singer

Gitta Walther was a German singer and author. She released many recordings under the pseudonyms Simone, Jackie Robinson and also Gitta MacKay after her marriage to Scottish musician Don MacKay.

== Background and life ==
Gitta Walter was born as the daughter of a baker during World War II and grew up in East Germany after the war. There, she first appeared on stage as a singer at the age of 14. At the age of 16, she emigrated to West Germany.

Once in Munich, West Germany, she was discovered by Werner Müller who accepted her into his orchestra. She went on to also sing in the orchestra of Ambros Seelos and Arno Flor. Since the mid-1960s, she was an active guest, studio and background singer for numerous bands and acts. In 1969, she joined Love Generation, where she met her future husband, Don Adams. She was later one of the session singers of the 1970s Silver Convention disco group. The famous scream in fellow group member Penny McLean's Lady Bump belongs to Walther. Further, she was one of the backing singers for Donna Summer, Giorgio Moroder and Joy Fleming.

She would work with Fritz Muschler, who also worked with disco group Ebony who recorded "Don't Boogie Mr. Tango.

As a solo musician, she released her album "I'm Different" in 1976 under the name Jackie Robinson. It was a success in the United States and stayed on the Billboard Disco Charts for seven weeks.

In 1980, she co-founded The Hornettes girl band, along with former Silver Convention singers Lucy Neale, Linda G. Thompson and Jackie Carter. The group was relatively successful.

== Career as Jackie Robinson ==
=== Moving Like a Superstar ===
Jackie Robinson recorded the Jean-Luc Drion Jack Donder composition, "Moving Like a Superstar" which was produced by Fritz Muschler. Backed with "Let Me Be" it was released on Ariola 89 749 XT in late 1975.

On the week of 17 April 1976, "Movin Like a Superstar" was in five Billboard Disco Action charts. It was also announced that week in Tom Moulton's Disco Mix column that Ariola America was rush releasing her album then called Moving Like a Superstar.

On the week of 24 April, the single debuted at no. 25 in the Record World R&B Singles chart. It was also at no. 12 in the Record World Disco File Top 20, and on the Discotheque Hit Parade, Infinity New York playlist (DJ Bobby Guttadaro).

On the week of 19 June, 1976. "Moving Like a Superstar" entered the RPM Top 100 singles chart at no. 100. It made it to no. 82 on the week of 3 July. In the US it would eventually make it to no. 10 on the Dance chart and no. 61 on the R&B chart.

=== Album ===
Her album I'm Different was produced by Fritz Muschler and Paul Birmingham. Half of the songs on the album were composed by Muschler. It was reviewed in the 14 May 1977 issue of RPM Weekly. With the successes that Birmingham and Muschler had in the past, the reviewer said that Robinson should be receiving a warm welcome in Canada.

=== Further activities ===
Robinson recorded "Warning - Danger" bw "Do You Really Wanna Go" which were released on single, Polydor 2001 827 in 1978. Both titles were composed and produced by Fritz Muschler and Paul Birmingham.

== Later years ==
In her final years, she lived in her hometown of Annaberg-Buchholz and sang locally.
