= Les Humphries Singers discography =

- Studio albums: 33
- Live albums: 3
- Compilation albums: 14
- Singles: 39
- Box sets: 3

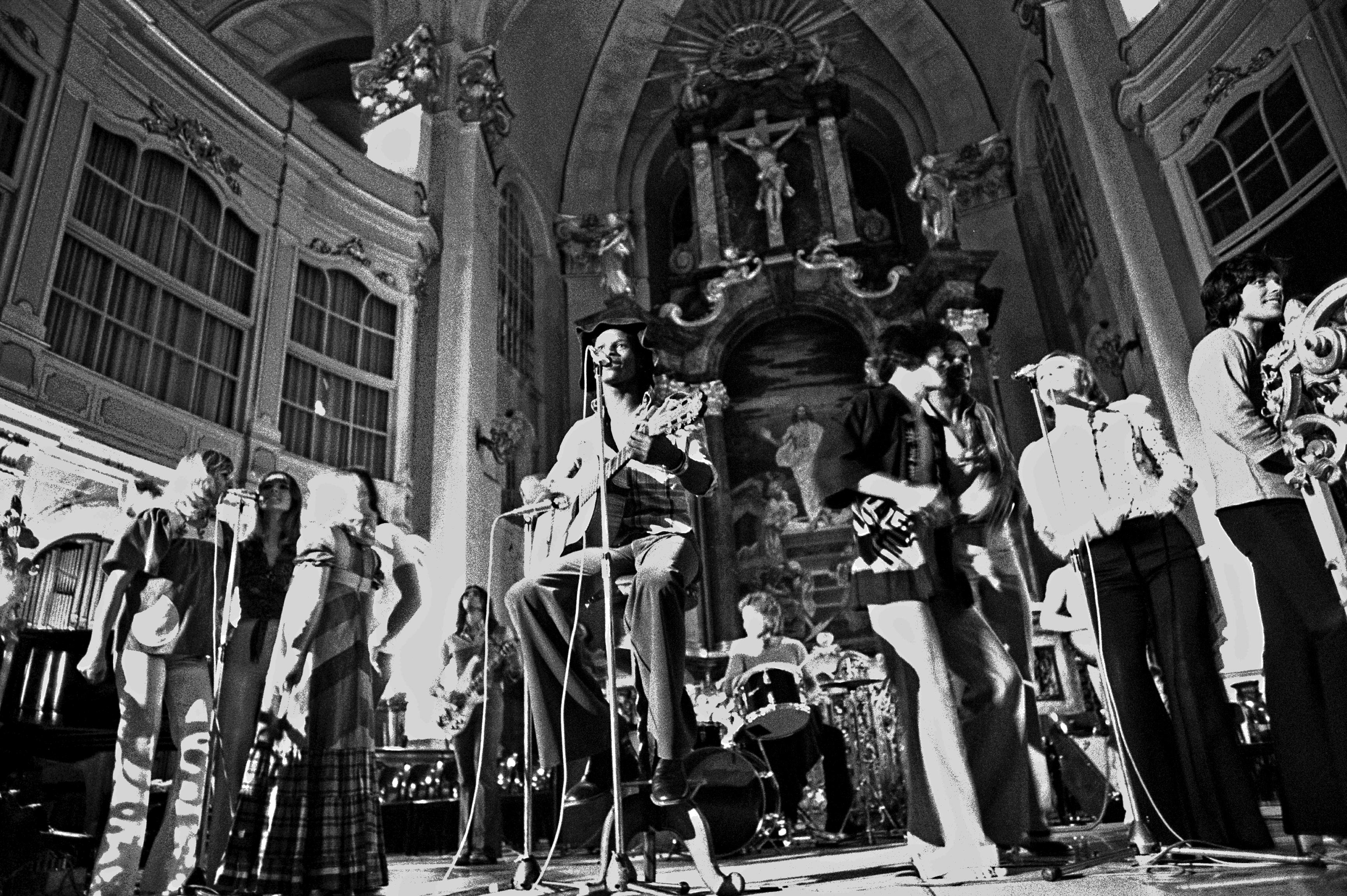
The Les Humphries Singers in St. Michael's Church, Hamburg, 1972

This is the discography of pop group Les Humphries Singers.

== Albums ==
=== Studio albums ===
==== As the Les Humphries Singers ====
Title	Album details	Peak chart positions				
Title	Album details	AUT	DAN	GER	NL	SWE
I Believe (a.k.a. Rock My Soul)	Released: 1970; Label: Decca; Formats: LP, MC, 8-track	—	—	—	—	—
We’ll Fly You to the Promised Land	Released: May 1971; Label: Decca; Formats: LP, MC, 8-track	—	—	9	—	—
We Are Goin’ Down Jordan	Released: October 1971; Label: Decca; Formats: LP, MC, 8-track	—	9	2	—	—
Old Man Moses (a.k.a. Take Care of Me)	Released: April 1972; Label: Decca; Formats: LP, MC, 8-track	—	—	2	—	—
Mexico	Released: October 1972; Label: Decca; Formats: LP, MC, 8-track	1	16	2	7	—
Seasons Greetings	Released: 1972; Label: Decca; Formats: LP, MC, 8-track	—	—	—	—	—
Mama Loo	Released: April 1973; Label: Decca; Formats: LP, MC, 8-track	2	2	1	—	6
Carnival	Released: November 1973; Label: Decca; Formats: LP, MC, 8-track	—	4	23	—	9
Kansas City	Released: April 1974; Label: Decca; Formats: LP, MC, 8-track	7	4	3	—	—
One of These Days	Released: 1974; Label: Decca; Formats: LP, MC, 8-track	—	—	—	—	—
Live for Today	Released: 1975; Label: Decca; Formats: LP, MC	—	—	—	—	—
Family Show	Released: 1975; Label: Decca; Formats: LP, MC	—	—	—	—	—
Sing Sang Song	Released: 1976; Label: Decca; Formats: LP, MC	—	—	—	—	—
Spirit of Freedom	Released: 1992; Label: Pilz; Formats: CD	—	—	—	—	—
Forever Young	Released: 1 November 2012; Label: LMG; Formats: CD, digital download	—	—	—	—	—
"—" denotes releases that did not chart or were not released in that territory.

==== Other studio albums ====
Title	Album details	Peak chart positions	
Title	Album details	DAN	GER
Singing Explosion	Released: 1970; Label: Decca; Formats: LP, MC; As Orchestra and Chorus Les Humphries	—	—
Singing Revolution	Released: 1971; Label: Decca; Formats: LP, MC, 8-track; As Orchestra and Chorus Les Humphries	—	—
The Family Singers	Released: 1971; Label: CBS; Formats: LP; As the Family Singers	—	—
Singing Kaleidoscope	Released: November 1971; Label: Decca; Formats: LP, MC, 8-track; As the Les Humphries Singers and Orchestra	—	17
Singing Rotation	Released: 1972; Label: Decca; Formats: LP, MC, 8-track; As the Les Humphries Singers and Orchestra	—	—
Singing Detonation	Released: April 1972; Label: Decca; Formats: LP, MC, 8-track; As Orchestra and Chorus Les Humphries	—	23
Sound '73	Released: March 1973; Label: Decca; Formats: LP, MC, 8-track; As Les Humphries Singers and Orchestra	4	8
One Night Band Stand	Released: 1973; Label: Decca; Formats: LP, MC, 8-track; As Les Humphries Orchestra	—	—
Sound '73/II	Released: November 1973; Label: Decca; Formats: LP, MC, 8-track; As Les Humphries Singers and Orchestra	8	—
Sound '74	Released: March 1974; Label: Decca; Formats: LP, MC, 8-track; As the Les Humphries Singers & Rhythm-Orchestra	5	19
Rock ’n’ Roll Party	Released: October 1974; Label: Decca; Formats: LP, MC, 8-track; As the Les Humphries Singers and R.&R.-Band	—	38
Piano Party	Released: 1974; Label: Decca; Formats: 2xLP; As Mr. Piano and His Band with Les Humphries and His Orchestra	—	—
Singing and Swinging – World Hits for Dancing	Released: 1975; Label: Decca; Formats: LP, MC; As the Les Humphries Orchestra, Choir and Piano	—	—
Rock’n'Roll Party II	Released: 1975; Label: Decca; Formats: LP, MC; As Les Humphries Singers and Orchestra	—	—
Les Humphries '75	Released: 1975; Label: Decca; Formats: LP, MC; As the Les Humphries Singers and Orchestra	—	—
Party on the Rocks	Released: 1975; Label: Decca; Formats: LP, MC; As the Les Humphries Singers and Orchestra	—	—
Singing Sensation	Released: 1976; Label: Decca; Formats: LP, MC; As the Les Humphries Singers and Orchestra	—	—
Disco Dancing	Released: 1976; Label: Decca; Formats: LP, MC; As the Les Humphries Singers and Orchestra	—	—
"—" denotes releases that did not chart or were not released in that territory.

=== Live albums ===
Title	Album details
Live in Concert	Released: 1972; Label: Decca; Formats: 2xLP, MC, 8-track
Live in Europe	Released: 1973; Label: Decca; Formats: LP, MC, 8-track; As the Les Humphries Singers and Orchestra
The Les Humphries Singers Live	Released: 1975; Label: Decca; Formats: 2xLP, MC

=== Compilation albums ===
Title	Album details	Peak chart positions	
Title	Album details	DAN	GER
Rock My Soul	Released: 1970; Label: Decca; Formats: LP	—	—
The World of the Les Humphries Singers	Released: 20 July 1973; Label: Decca; Formats: LP, MC, 8-track	—	15
Swinging Sound	Released: 1973; Label: Decca; Formats: LP, MC, 8-track	—	—
The Golden World of the Les Humphries Singers	Released: August 1974; Label: Accord; Formats: LP, MC, 8-track	9	41
20 Golden Hits	Released: 1975; Label: Decca; Formats: LP, MC	—	—
20 Grössten Hits	Released: November 1976; Label: Arcade; Formats: LP, MC	—	25
Mexico	Released: 1981; Label: Decca; Formats: LP	—	—
Portrait	Released: 1982; Label: Telefunken; Formats: 2xLP	—	—
The Best of the Les Humphries Singers	Released: 1990; Label: Teldec; Formats: CD, LP	—	—
The Very Best Of	Released: 1996; Label: Bellvue Entertainment; Formats: CD	—	—
Greatest Hits – Das Beste	Released: 2001; Label: Telefunken; Formats: CD	—	—
The Platinum Collection	Released: 2006; Label: Warner Music; Formats: CD	—	—
The Best of the Les Humphries Singers	Released: 2007; Label: Sonocord; Formats: 2xCD	—	—
Live 1971–1975 – Live at the Olympia Paris & Musikhalle Hamburg	Released: 2012; Label: Warner Music; Formats: 2xCD	—	—
"—" denotes releases that did not chart or were not released in that territory.

=== Box sets ===
Title	Album details
Mama Loo – 40 Jahre	Released: 2007; Label: Reader's Digest; Formats: 3xCD
Original Album Series	Released: 2011; Label: Warner Music; Formats: 5xCD
Original Album Series 2	Released: 2014; Label: Warner Music; Formats: 5xCD

== Singles ==
Title	Year	Peak chart positions										Album
Title	Year	AUS	AUT	BEL (FL)	BEL (WA)	DEN	FIN	GER	NL	SWE	SWI	Album
"Rock My Soul"	1970	—	—	—	—	—	—	—	—	—	—	I Believe
"Michael"	1970	—	—	—	—	—	—	—	—	—	—	We'll Fly You to the Promised Land
"To My Father's House"	1970	—	—	2	19	—	—	—	1	—	—	I Believe
"Soolaimon"	1970	—	—	—	—	—	—	—	—	—	—	We'll Fly You to the Promised Land
"This Ole House"	1971	—	—	—	—	—	—	—	—	—	—	Non-album single
"(We'll Fly You to The) Promised Land"	1971	—	—	18	33	—	—	13	26	—	—	We'll Fly You to the Promised Land
"We Are Goin' Down Jordan"	1971	—	—	—	—	2	—	3	9	—	3	We Are Goin' Down Jordan
"Old Man Moses"	1972	—	—	—	—	3	—	14	17	—	4	Old Man Moses
"White Bread" (as the Family Singers)	1972	—	—	—	—	—	—	—	—	—	—	The Family Singers
"Take Care of Me"	1972	—	—	—	—	17	—	31	—	—	—	Old Man Moses
"Mexico"	1972	62	1	2	18	8	14	2	2	5	1	Mexico
"O Come All Ye Faithful"	1972	—	—	—	—	—	—	—	—	—	—	Seasons Greetings
"Mama Loo"	1973	—	1	10	36	1	26	1	12	3	1	Mama Loo
"Carnival"	1973	—	—	—	—	10	—	14	—	—	—	Carnival
"Kentucky Dew"	1973	—	—	—	—	—	—	—	—	—	—	Carnival
"Kansas City"	1973	—	15	—	—	8	—	2	—	—	1	Kansas City
"Do You Kill Me or Do I Kill You"	1974	—	—	—	—	26	—	46	—	—	—	One of These Days
"Do You Wanna Rock and Roll?"	1974	—	—	—	—	—	—	50	—	—	—	One of These Days
"Derrick" (as Orchester Les Humphries)	1974	—	—	—	—	—	—	—	—	—	—	Non-album single (Note: Theme tune to the television series Derrick)
"New Orleans"	1974	—	—	—	—	—	—	33	—	—	—	Live for Today
"Top Szene Hamburg"	1975	—	—	—	—	—	—	—	—	—	—	Top Szene Hamburg
"She's Really Something Else"	1975	—	—	—	—	—	—	—	—	—	—	Mexico
"California"	1975	—	—	—	—	—	—	—	—	—	—	Family Show
"It's Timex Time"	1975	—	—	—	—	—	—	—	—	—	—	Non-album single (Note: Promotion for Timex watches)
"Family Show"	1975	—	—	—	—	—	—	—	—	—	—	Family Show
"Spanish Discotheque"	1976	—	—	—	—	—	—	—	—	—	—	Sing Sang Song
"Sing Sang Song"	1976	—	—	—	—	—	—	45	—	—	—	Sing Sang Song
"Indian War"	1976	—	—	—	—	—	—	—	—	—	—	Non-album singles
"Going Home" (with the Pipes & Drums of the Royal Scots (The Royal Regiment))	1977	—	—	—	—	—	—	—	—	—	—	Non-album singles
"Mexico" (re-release)	1981	—	—	—	—	—	—	—	8	—	—	Mexico
"Les Humphries' Dancin' Medley"	1981	—	—	—	—	—	—	—	—	—	—	Non-album singles
"Mexico" (remix)	1986	—	—	—	—	—	—	—	—	—	—	Non-album singles
"Mega-Remix '89"	1989	—	—	—	—	—	—	—	—	—	—	Non-album singles
"Spirit of Freedom"	1992	—	—	—	—	—	—	—	—	—	—	Spirit of Freedom
"Ramba Shamba"	1993	—	—	—	—	—	—	—	—	—	—	Spirit of Freedom
"Forever Young"	2012	—	—	—	—	—	—	—	—	—	—	Forever Young
"Yes We Can (We Can Do It Again)"	2013	—	—	—	—	—	—	—	—	—	—	Forever Young
"I Was Born"	2013	—	—	—	—	—	—	—	—	—	—	Non-album singles
"Mama Knows"	2014	—	—	—	—	—	—	—	—	—	—	Non-album singles
"—" denotes releases that did not chart or were not released in that territory.
