= Disques Vogue =

French jazz record label

Disques Vogue SA
- Parent company: Sony Music Entertainment
- Founded: 1947
- Founder: Léon Cabat; Charles Delaunay
- Genre: Jazz, pop
- Country of origin: France

Disques Vogue was a jazz record company founded in France by Léon Cabat and Charles Delaunay in 1947, the year after the American Vogue label ceased.

They originally specialized in jazz, featuring American performers such as Sidney Bechet, Dizzy Gillespie, and Gigi Gryce (sessions reissued on CD under Clifford Brown's name), in addition to local musicians Django Reinhardt and Martial Solal. In the late 1950s Vogue expanded into pop music, recording artists such as Petula Clark. In the 1960s and early 1970s the label added Jacques Dutronc and Françoise Hardy. They licensed recordings by ABBA for release in Belgium and France and European distribution of Recordings of Monsieur Tranquille.

Vogue Records, a British offshoot, was founded in 1951 and absorbed by English Decca (then separate from the American company) around 1956, but the rights to the name reverted to the French parent in 1962, whereupon Decca renamed its Vogue label Vocalion. A new Disques Vogue sister label was established in Britain as part of the Pye Group. The label's catalogue is now part of Sony Music.

== Subsidiary ==
A subsidiary of Disques Vogue was Vogue Schallplatten. It was founded by Karl Plotz and co. in 1960.

Die Teenies had a single, "Ein Rosarotes Kleid" bw "He Hully Hully Ho" on Vogue Schallplatten DV 14168, which was released in 1964.

Petula Clark had two singles issued on the label in 1965, they were "Come On My Boy" bw "Darling Verzeih" on Vogue Schallplatten DV 14345 and "Downtown" bw "Darling Cheri" on Vogue Schallplatten DV 14297. In 1968, "Kiss Me Goodbye" bw "Lass Keinen Tag Vergeh'n" was released on Vogue Schallplatten DV 14719. In 1969, the label released Petula Clark's A Touch of Petula Clark on Vogue Schallplatten LDVS 17175. It was Re-released in 1973 on Bellaphon BLS 5517.

The Blackberries, a German band featuring Fritz Muschler and Oliver Freytag recorded for the label in the 1960s. The three singles they recorded for the label were, "I Need A Time-Machine", " Bakerstreet" and "Herz ist Trumpf", all released in 1968. In the 1970s, Muschler would produce recordings for Marion and Antony, Jackie Robinson, Daffi Cramer, and writing for Ebony.

Chuck Bennett had some success with his single, "I Can Feel It" bw "Love with a Touch of Soul" (Vogue Shallplatten DV 14915). It became a minor hit for him. The first record he had released on the label was "Wann Wird Die Menschheit Klug?" which charted. However, it was the Eric Allandale composition "I Can Feel It" from The Foundations' album, Digging The Foundations that gave him the bigger chart success.

Others artists include Françoise Hardy with her album A Touch of Music on Vogue Shallplatten LDVS 17 172, Udo Jürgens with the single "Kiss Me Quick" bw "Tausend Träume" (Vogue Schallplatten DV 14053), and Charles Wilp with his album Fotografiert Bunny (Vogue Schallplatten – LDVS 17 123).

== See also ==
- List of record labels
