= Many Rivers to Cross =

1969 single by Jimmy Cliff

- One of flip sides of the 1978 German release

Single by Jimmy Cliff

from the album Jimmy Cliff and The Harder They Come
- Released: 1969
- Genre: Reggae
- Length: 2:44
- Label: Trojan
- Songwriter: Jimmy Cliff

Jimmy Cliff singles chronology
"Waterfall" (1969)	"Many Rivers to Cross" (1969)	"Wonderful World, Beautiful People" (1969)

"Many Rivers to Cross" is a song written and recorded in 1969 by Jimmy Cliff. It has since been recorded by many musicians, most successfully by UB40, Cher, Harry Nilsson, Annie Lennox, Joe Cocker and Toni Childs.

== Background ==
Cliff was 25 when he wrote and recorded the song in 1969. He has said he wrote it due to the trouble he was having making it as a musical artist after moving to the United Kingdom. "When I came to the UK, I was still in my teens. I came full of vigor: I'm going to make it, I'm going to be up there with the Beatles and the Stones," he told The Daily Telegraph. "And it wasn't really going like that. I was touring clubs, not breaking through. I was struggling, with work, life, my identity, I couldn't find my place; frustration fueled the song."

Regarding the line, "Wandering I am lost, as I travel along the White Cliffs of Dover," Cliff stated, "...that came from the number of times I crossed the channel to the continent. Most of the time it was France but sometimes it was Germany. It was a very frustrating time. I came to England with very big hopes and I saw my hopes fading. And that song came out of that experience."

== Song information ==
Cliff stated he was working on his second album for Island Records, but held the song back because he did not think a ballad would be appropriate. He waited until he came to New York to mix the record and add overdubs and backing vocals. He was walking from his residence to the studio, which took 15 minutes, and finished composing the song in his head. On the last day of the session, as the union backing musicians were preparing to leave, Cliff asked if he could play a song idea he had. He said, "I started singing, the band came in, and that was it. Once. That was it. And then Chris [Blackwell] said, ‘OK, let's put this one in to fill out the album.’"

This is one of the few Cliff tracks to use an organ, which helps to supplement the gospel feel provided by the backing vocalists. He released the song, with production work by Leslie Kong, on his 1969 album, Jimmy Cliff. It was also released on the 1972 soundtrack album for the film The Harder They Come, in which Cliff also starred. Rolling Stone ranked it No. 325 on their list of the 500 Greatest Songs of All Time.

The 1998 Sri Lankan song Nadee Ganga Tharanaye sung by Chitral Somapala is based on, and takes its melody from, Many Rivers to Cross.

=== Charts ===
Charts (1993)	Peak position
France (SNEP)	37

== UB40 version ==
"Many Rivers to Cross"
- Side A of the UK seven-inch single

Single by UB40

from the album Labour of Love
- B-side: "Food for Thought"
- Released: 28 November 1983
- Genre: Reggae fusion
- Length: 4:31
- Label: DEP International (UK)
- Songwriter: Jimmy Cliff
- Producers: UB40; Ray "Pablo" Falconer

UB40 singles chronology
"Please Don't Make Me Cry" (1983)	"Many Rivers to Cross" (1983)	"Cherry Oh Baby" (1984)

Music video
- "Many Rivers to Cross" on YouTube

"'Many Rivers to Cross" is the third single from the album Labour of Love by the reggae group UB40. This single peaked at the number 16 on the UK Singles Chart and the number 48 in New Zealand.

=== Track listing and formats ===
- 7-inch single
1. "Many Rivers To Cross" – 3:48
2. "Food for Thought " – 4:40
- 12-inch maxi-single
1. A1."Many Rivers To Cross" (Full Length Version) – 4:35
2. A2."Food for Thought " – 4:40
3. B2."Johnny Too Bad" (Unexpurgated Version – Not on Labour of Love) – 5:28

=== Personnel ===
UB40

- James Brown – drums, syncussion
- Ali Campbell – vocals, guitar
- Robin Campbell – guitar, vocals
- Earl Falconer – bass
- Norman Hassan – percussion, vocals
- Brian Travers – saxophones
- Michael Virtue – keyboards
- Astro – toasting, rhyming, percussion

Additional personnel

- Mo Birch – vocals
- Jaki Graham – vocals
- Jackie Mittoo – additional keyboards
- Ruby Turner – vocals

=== Charts ===
Chart (1983)	Peak position
New Zealand (Recorded Music NZ)	48
UK Singles Chart	16

=== Certifications ===
Region	Certification	Certified units/sales
New Zealand (RMNZ)	Gold	15,000^{‡}
United Kingdom (BPI)	Silver	200,000^{‡}
^{‡} Sales+streaming figures based on certification alone.

== Cher version ==
"Many Rivers to Cross"

Single by Cher

from the album Greatest Hits: 1965–1992
- Released: 4 January 1993
- Recorded: 1992
- Length: 4:10
- Label: Geffen
- Songwriter: Jimmy Cliff
- Producer: Cher

Cher singles chronology
"Oh No Not My Baby" (1992)	"Many Rivers to Cross" (1993)	"Whenever You're Near" (1993)

=== Track listing ===
- European 7-inch and cassette single
1. "Many Rivers to Cross" – 4:09
2. "Who You Gonna Believe" – 4:42
- European CD single
1. "Many Rivers to Cross" – 4:09
2. "Who You Gonna Believe" – 4:42
3. "All Because of You" – 3:28
4. "Perfection" – 4:29
- UK second live cover versions CD single
1. "Many Rivers to Cross" – 4:09
2. "Tougher Than the Rest" – 4:43
3. "Fire Down Below" – 4:28
4. "Takin' It to the Streets" – 4:05

=== Charts ===
Chart (1993)	Peak position
UK Singles (Official Charts)	37

== Annie Lennox version ==
=== Charts ===
Chart (2008)	Peak position
Canadian Singles Chart	47
U.S. Billboard Hot 100	80
