= Moving Like a Superstar =

Song by Jackie Robinson

from the album I'm Different
- A-side: "Moving Like a Superstar"
- B-side: "Let Me Be"
- Released: 1975
- Length: 3:19
- Label: Ariola 16 490 AT
- Composer: Drion/Donder
- Producer: Fritz Muschler

"Moving Like a Superstar" was a 1976 single for Jackie Robinson. It became a hit for her the following year, charting in both the United States and Canada.

== Background ==
The song was composed by Jean-Luc Drion and Jack Donde. Jackie Robinson recorded the song which was produced by Fritz Muschler. Backed with "Let Me Be" it was released on Ariola 89 749 XT in late 1975.

== Charts ==
For the week of 17 April 1976, "Movin Like a Superstar" was in five Billboard Disco Action charts. It was also announced that week in Tom Moulton's Disco Mix column that there was a rush-release of her album by Ariola America. At the time it was called Moving Like a Superstar.

For the week of 24 April, the single made its debut at no. 25 in the Record World R&B Singles chart. It was also at no. 12 in the Record World Disco File Top 20, and on the Discotheque Hit Parade, Infinity New York playlist (DJ Bobby Guttadaro).

For the week of 1 May, the single, referred to as "Movin' Like a Super Star" debuted at no. 89 in the Billboard Hot Soul Singles chart. Referred to as "Moving Like a Superstar", it was in five Disco Action charts at nos. 11, 10, 5, 6 and 8 respectively. At week six on 5 June, it peaked at no. 61. It spent one more week in the chart.

For the week of 19 June 1976. "Moving Like a Superstar" made its debut on the RPM Top 100 singles chart at no. 100. It made it to no. 82 on the week of 3 July. In the US it would eventually make it to no. 10 on the Dance chart and no. 61 on the R&B chart.
