= Wonderful World, Beautiful People =

Single by Jimmy Cliff

from the album Jimmy Cliff
- B-side: "Hard Road to Travel"
- Released: October 24, 1969
- Length: 3:11
- Label: Trojan TR 690
- Songwriter: Jimmy Cliff
- Producer: Leslie Kong

Jimmy Cliff singles chronology
| "Waterfall" (1968) | "Wonderful World, Beautiful People" (1969) | "Vietnam" (1970) |

"Wonderful World, Beautiful People" is a single by Jimmy Cliff. Released in October 1969, it became a top-ten hit in the UK. It was a hit in other countries as well.

== Background ==
"Wonderful World, Beautiful People" was released by Trojan Records on October 24, 1969.

The song was composed by Jimmy Cliff and produced by Leslie Kong. The song is about what the world could be. Politicians Harold Wilson, Richard Nixon, Georges Pompidou and Alexei Kosygin are mentioned in the song. It was a first hit for the Trojan label. It was originally recorded in the West Indies. Jimmy Cliff wasn't satisfied with the orchestral backing so in order to get the strings right, he flew to New York in early October and spent three hours in a twelve track studio re-recording the orchestral parts.

== Charts ==
The single made its debut at no. 20 in the NME Top 30 for week ending November 1, 1969. Having been in the NME Top 30 chart for four weeks, it peaked at no. 6 on the week ending November 22. It peaked at no. 25 in the US. In Canada the song reached No. 13.

== Performances ==
The song was performed for the first time in public at the Caribbean Music Festival which was held in Wembley in 1969.

== Other versions ==
American singer Chuck Bennett recorded a version of the song in German. It was released in 1970 as "Schön Ist Die Welt". It was the B-side to another Jimmy Cliff song, "Wann Wird Die Menschheit Klug?" ("Sufferin' in the Land") which was a minor hit for him in Germany.

Kai Warner included the song on his 1980 album, It's Reggae Time.

Amazulu had a hit in the UK with it in 1987. Their version reached No. 97 during a single week on the chart.
