= Alle Mädchen wollen küssen =

"Alle Mädchen wollen küssen" (All girls want to kiss) is a song originally recorded by Leo Leandros, released in 1959. Other recorded versions include Peter Kraus, Bob Gerry, and Die Roten Rosen.

It has also been recorded in French as "Je suis content... je chante" by Richard Anthony, in English as "Be Mine" by both Lance Fortune and Lillian Briggs, in Spanish as "Solo para me" by Dúo Dinámico, and in Portuguese as "Seja o meu amor" by Tony Campelo.

== Die Roten Rosen cover ==
"Alle Mädchen wollen küssen"

Single by Die Roten Rosen

from the album Never Mind the Hosen, Here's Die Roten Rosen
- Released: 1987
- Genre: Punk rock
- Length: 1:26
- Label: Virgin Records
- Songwriter(s): Joe Menke, Leo Leandros, Tobby Lüth

Die Roten Rosen singles chronology
"Im Wagen vor mir" (1987)	"Alle Mädchen wollen küssen" (1987)	"Hier kommt Alex" (1988)

The song was covered by Die Toten Hosen for the 1987 cover album Never Mind the Hosen, Here's Die Roten Rosen. It was released as the third single from the album, released under the alias Die Roten Rosen.

=== Track listing ===
1. "Alle Mädchen wollen küssen" − 1:26
2. "Liebesspieler (High-Noon-Mix)" (Love Player) (Breitkopf, Frege/Frege) − 3:28
3. "Opel-Gang (Trucking-Mix)" (v. Holst, Frege/Breitkopf, Frege, v. Holst, Meurer, Trimpop) − 2:29
