= Du gehst fort =

Du gehst fort is a 1975 song by Marion & Antony and Adam & Eve. It has also been covered by other artists.

== Overview ==
The song was composed by Eckart Hachfeld and Alain Barrière. It was the German version of Alain Barriere's smash hit "Tu t'en vas" (You're Leaving) which, by August 1975, had sold 400,000 copies via Ariola.

== Marion & Antony version ==
"Du gehst fort (Tu t'en vas)"

Single by Marion & Antony
- A-side: "Du gehst fort"
- B-side: "Ein Mädchen in Athen"
- Written: A. Barriere/E. Hachfield
- Released: 1975
- Length: 4:19
- Label: Ariola 16 222 AT
- Producer: Fritz Muschler

=== Background ===
Working with producer Fritz Muschler, German duo Marion & Antony recorded their version of the song which was released on Ariola 16 222 AT. The B side "Ein Mädchen in Athen", credited to Marion Maerz was composed by Michael Kunze and Werner Scharfenberger and produced by Kunze.

=== Charts ===
The song spent thirteen weeks in the German charts, peaking at no. 15. It didn't make the main charts in other countries.

== Adam & Eve version ==
"Du gehst fort"

Single by Adam & Eve
- A-side: "Du gehst fort"
- B-side: "Wenn ich dich seh'n will"
- Released: July 1975
- Length: 4:27
- Label: EMI 1C 006-31 363, EMI Electrola 1C 006-31 363
- Composers: (M u, Orig,-T. : Barriere/dtsh, T: Hachfield / Arr. : Biste)

=== Background ===
German duo, Adam & Eve recorded their version of the song. Backed with "Wenn ich dich seh'n will", it was released on EMI 006-31 363 in July 1975.

=== Reception ===
According to Paul Seigel in the 16 August 1975 issue of Record World, the latest release from Adam & Eve, "Du Gehst Fort" (You're Leaving) which was from the French hit "Tu T'en Vas, was brand new and looking good.

=== Charts ===
For the week of 11 October, 1975, " Du gehst fort" was at no. 19 in the West Germany section of the Billboard Hits of the World chart. For the week of 1 November, the single was at no. 9 in the German section of the Cash Box International Bestsellers chart.

The record spent ten weeks in the main German charts, peaking at no. 16.

== Other versions ==
A version by Ireen Sheer & Bernhard Brink was released on the Electrola label in July 1992. Their recording was produced by Uwe Busse and Karlheinz Rupprich. It was performed on ZDF-Hitparade on 27 August 1992 and 21 January 1993.
