= Jimmy Cliff (album) =

Studio album by Jimmy Cliff
- Released: 1969
- Genre: Reggae
- Length: 34:58 (LP); 49:19 (CD)
- Labels: Trojan; A&M (US)
- Producers: Larry Fallon; John Kelly; Leslie Kong

Jimmy Cliff chronology
Hard Road to Travel (1967)	Jimmy Cliff (1969)	Another Cycle (1971)

Singles from Jimmy Cliff
- 1. "That's the Way Life Goes" Released: 1967; 2. "Vietnam" Released: 1968; 3. "Wonderful World, Beautiful People" Released: October 24, 1969; 4. "Come into My Life" Released: 1970; 5. "Sufferin' in the Land" Released: 1970

Wonderful World, Beautiful People
- A&M Records edition (1970)

Professional ratings
Review scores
Source	Rating
AllMusic	4.5/5 stars
Christgau's Record Guide	B+

Jimmy Cliff is a 1969 album by Jimmy Cliff. It was retitled Wonderful World, Beautiful People after the track of that name was released as a single in the U.S. Richard Polak, who is credited with the sleeves of a number of Island Records artists in the early 1970s, is credited with photography.

== Track listing ==
All tracks are written by Jimmy Cliff; except where indicated.

Side one
No.	Title	Writer(s)	Length
1.	"Time Will Tell"		4:12
2.	"Many Rivers to Cross"		2:44
3.	"Vietnam"		4:52
4.	"Use What I Got"	Jimmy Holiday	3:04
5.	"Hard Road to Travel"		2:36
Total length:			16:48

Side two
No.	Title	Writer(s)	Length
1.	"Wonderful World, Beautiful People"		3:15
2.	"Sufferin' in the Land"		3:12
3.	"Hello Sunshine"		2:49
4.	"My Ancestors"	Demetriss Tapp	3:34
5.	"That's the Way Life Goes"		2:12
6.	"Come Into My Life"		2:55
Total length:			18:10

2001 CD re-issue bonus tracks
No.	Title	Writer(s)	Length
12.	"Let's Dance"		2:36
13.	"Give a Little, Take a Little"		2:28
14.	"Those Good, Good Old Days"		3:46
15.	"Pack Up, Hang Ups"		3:37
16.	"My World Is Blue"		2:53
17.	"Better Days Are Coming"		3:21
18.	"Where Did It Go?"	Desmond Dekker, Leslie Kong	3:17
