= Les Humphries Singers =

German band

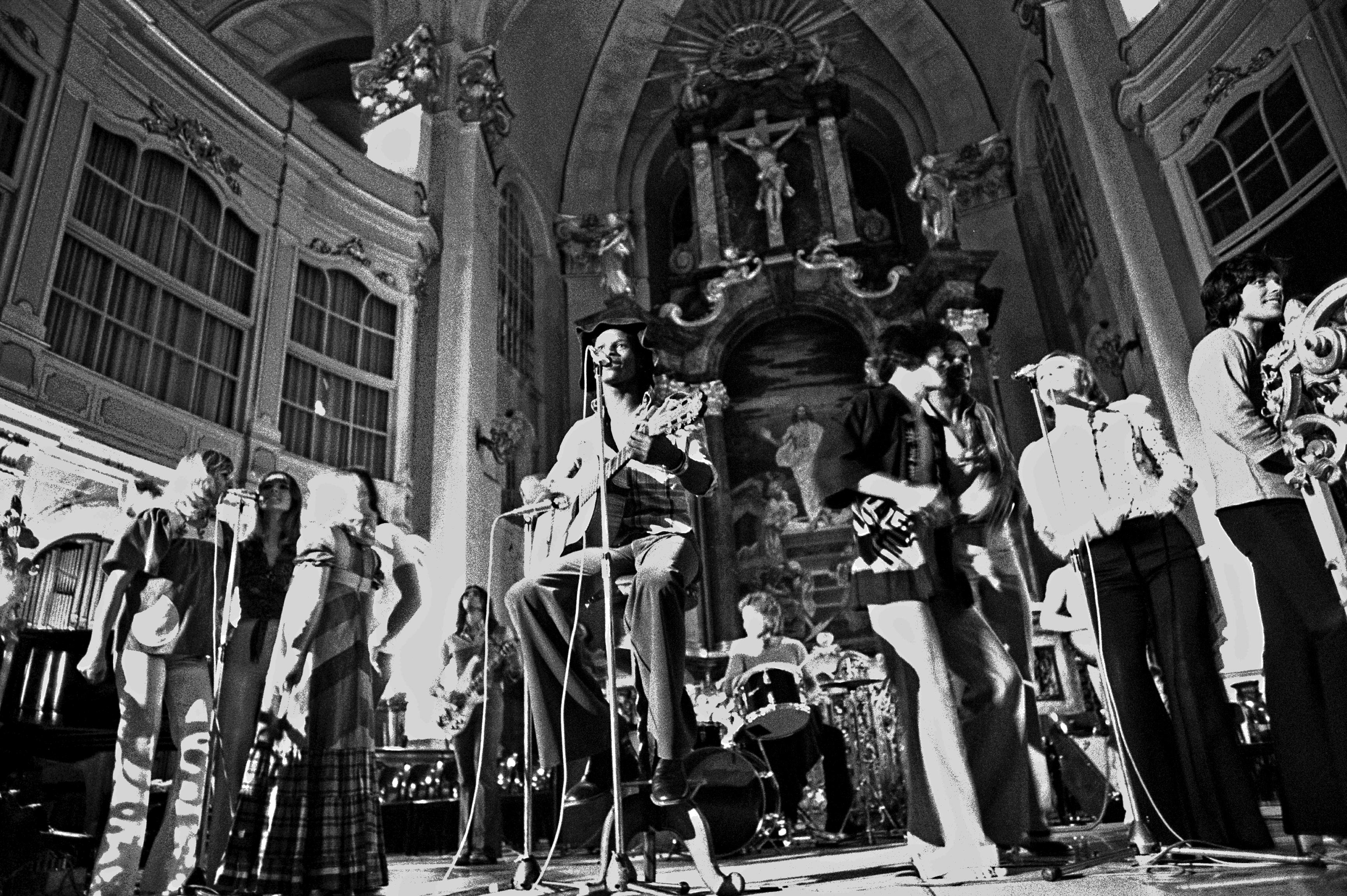
- Les Humphries Singers performing at St. Michael's Church, Hamburg in 1972

Background information
- Origin: Hamburg, Germany
- Genres: Pop; gospel; country; R&B; psychedelic; folk-pop
- Years active: 1969–1980
- Past members: Members

The Les Humphries Singers was a pop vocal group formed in Hamburg, West Germany, by English singer Les Humphries. Active from 1969 until 1980, the group had several chart hits in Germany and in other European countries. The group, whose music drew heavily from gospel, country, folk, R&B and psychedelic influences, was notable for its large number of members, which at times numbered over a dozen to 30. Several of its members, including John Lawton, Jürgen Drews and Liz Mitchell, went on to have notable careers of their own.

== History and members ==
Les Humphries was born John Leslie Humphreys on 10 August 1940 in Croydon, Surrey, England. He served in the Royal Navy, where he was a member of the naval band and attained the rank of band sergeant major. In 1969, inspired by the success of the Edwin Hawkins Singers gospel group, he formed Les Humphries Singers in Hamburg, where he had relocated. The original line-up included Humphries, Jimmy Bilsbury, and Malcolm Magaron as lead vocals, supported by Jürgen Drews, Judy Archer, En David, Myrna David, Peggy Evers, Dornee Edwards, Henner Hoier, Heike Kloen, Liz Mitchell, Victor Scott and Tina Werner.

The group consisted of a large number of singers of diverse ethnic origin, some of whom such as Scottish musician Don MacKay as well as John Lawton also performed with other groups. Another member was Jürgen Drews, who later started a long-running solo career, starting with his 1976 hit in Germany, "Ein Bett im Kornfeld", a cover version of "Let Your Love Flow" by The Bellamy Brothers. Linda Thompson (born 21 September 1948 as Linda Übelherr, not to be confused with English singer Linda Thompson), who had previously been a member of the Cornely Singers and Love Generation alongside Scottish musician Don MacKay, was a member from 1973 to 1974; she later joined Silver Convention, had a solo career as Linda G. Thompson, sang as a duo with Jerry Rix, and joined The Hornettes. Henner Hoier (born 19 April 1945), who was a member from 1970 to 1971, had been a member of the Rivets (1964- 1968) and of the Rattles (1968-1970). From 1972 onwards, he would go on a solo career before reforming the Rattles (1988-1993) and the Rivets (in 1994). He has also composed and produced music, and appeared in the musical Only You.

Liz Mitchell later became frontwoman of Boney M., while John Lawton also sang for the German progressive/hard rock band Lucifer's Friend and would go on to front Uriah Heep.

In 1974, the Les Humphries Singers starred in the German movie Es knallt - und die Engel singen], directed by Roberto Leoni (as Butch Lion) and produced by Dieter Geissler Filmproduktion.

Humphries died on 26 December 2007 in Basingstoke, England from a heart attack after a severe bout of pneumonia.

== List of current and former members ==
- Les Humphries (1969–80) (died 26 December 2007)
- Don Adams (1974–75) (died 1995)
- Jimmy Bilsbury (1969–77, 1982, 1992) (died 10 March 2003)
- John Lawton (1971–76) (died 29 June 2021)
- Earl Jordan (1972–76, 1982)
- Barry St. John (1972–73) (died 24 July 2020)
- Jürgen Drews (1969–??)
- Victor Scott (1970–76, 1982, 1992) (died 10 May 2020)
- Christopher Yim (1971–76, 1992)
- Peggy Evers (1970–76)
- Judy Archer (1970–76)
- Elvira Herbert (1972–75) (died 8 March 1980)
- Dave O'Brien (1973–76)
- Sheila McKinlay (1973–75, 1982, 1992)
- Enry David-Fascher (1970–72)
- Myrna David (1971–72)
- Malcolm Magaron (1970–72)
- Claudia Schwarz (1974–76)
- Emily Woods-Jensen (1974–76, 1992)
- Dornée Edwards (1970–71)
- Maddy Verhaar (1975–76)
- Lil Walker
- Tina Kemp-Werner (1970–74)
- Barbara Johnson
- Gail Stevens (1974)
- Goldy Kloen-Evert (1970–71)
- Irene Bendorf (1971)
- Renate Andersen-Bilsbury (1974–76, 1982)
- Liz Mitchell

== Musical background and style ==
The Les Humphries Singers performed a mix of pop and gospel covers and had some success in Europe with this approach. Like the contemporary disco act Boney M., their music focused on rhythm and blues, gospel, and disco, but often with psychedelic phasing or flanger effects on solos and bridges, and, much like James Last, larger background choruses in the studio to emulate a live atmosphere. The Les Humphries Singers at the time brought something from the flair of the hippie movement into contemporary German-produced (but English-sung) pop music, especially due to their mixed ethnic background and unusual fashion sense.

== Hits and later reunions ==
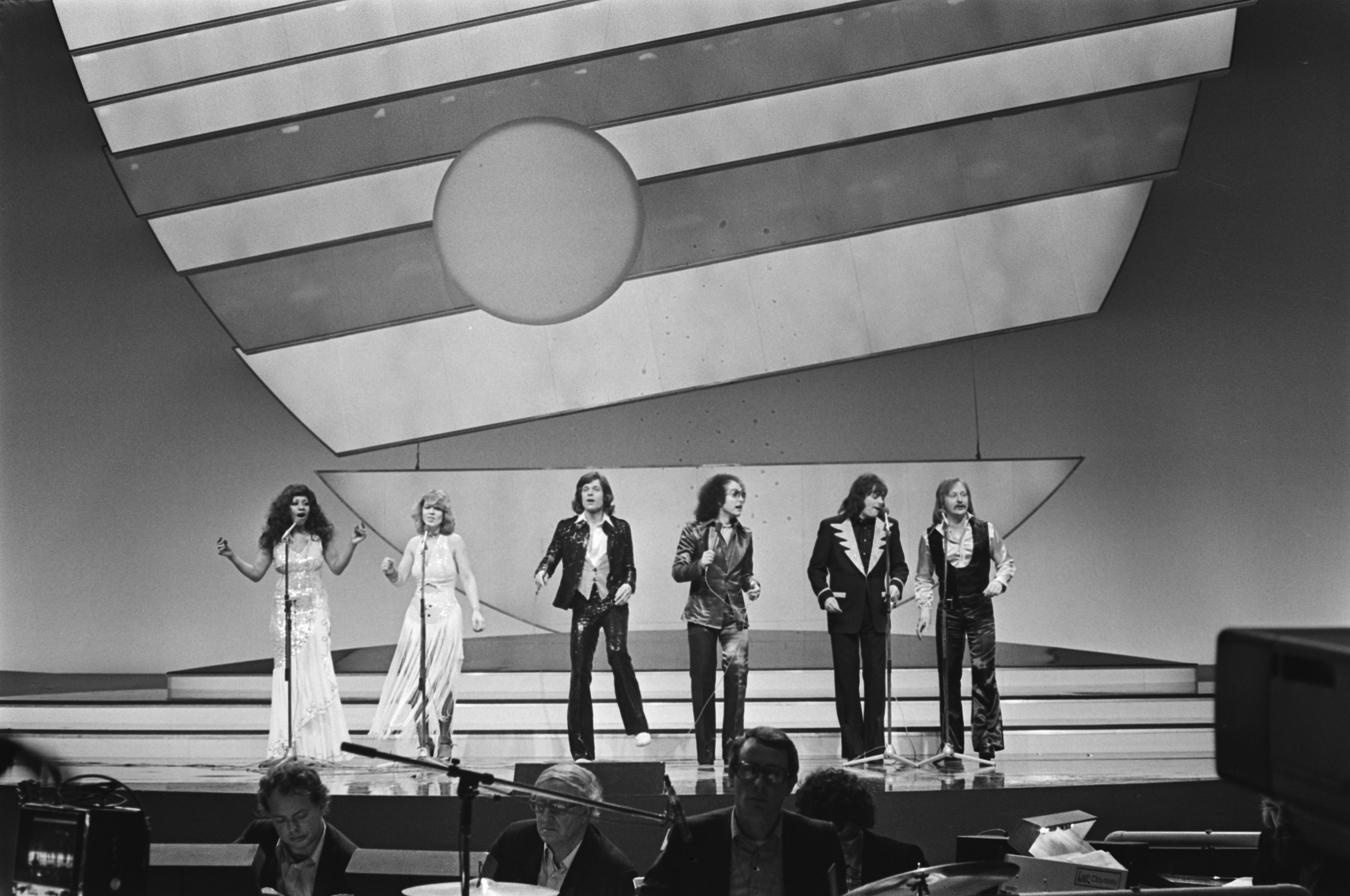
Les Humphries Singers at the Eurovision Song Contest 1976

Two of their earliest and best known hits were "Mexico" (1972) which was based on the 1957 Jimmy Driftwood country hit "The Battle of New Orleans", and "Mama Loo" (1973), based on "Barbara Ann" by The Beach Boys. On later albums they released "Mexico" with different lyrics, most likely due to copyright problems (plagiarism). In 1976 they represented Germany at the Eurovision Song Contest with the Ralph Siegel title "Sing Sang Song", reduced to only six singers (their usual line-ups consisted of 20 performers and up), and came in 15th place, which they regarded as their beginning of the end as a band. (They were initially the runner-up in the national final behind Tony Marshall who was later disqualified) At the same time, they were the resident vocal band on the internationally syndicated TV series The International Pop Proms, working with James Last and other renowned artists.

They disbanded shortly thereafter the same year, but enjoyed a short comeback as a pure live act from 1991 until 1993, performing their old hits.

In 2006, the original band members formed "The Original Singers" without Humphries, but with new members Chris Dakota, David Tobin, Jay Jay van Hagen and Willi Meyer, re-recording their old hits and also releasing new material.

The former members, Jürgen Drews, Tina Kemp-Werner, Judy Archer and Peggy Evers-Hartig, formed a group called the "Les Humphries Singers Reunion" in 2009.

== Filmography ==
- 1974 - Es knallt - und die Engel singen directed by Roberto Leoni (as Butch Lion)
- 2008 - Die Les Humphries Singers - Aufstieg Und Fall Einer Poplegende directed by Andreas Fischer

Preceded by Joy Fleming with Ein Lied kann eine Brücke sein	Germany in the Eurovision Song Contest; 1976	Succeeded by Silver Convention with Telegram
