= Fritz Muschler =

German musician (1945–2010)

- Also known as: Will Kinger
- Born: 3 May 1945; Germany
- Died: 26 November 2010 (aged 65)
- Occupations: Musician, record producer, composer, arranger
- Formerly of: The Blackberries

Fritz Muschler was a German musician, record producer, arranger and composer. He had success with his compositions and production during the 1970s and he later provided music for film.

== Background ==
During the 1960s, Fritz Muschler was a member of The Blackberries, a German beat band.

As a producer and composer, Muschler worked with artists such as Daffi Cramer, Peter Maffay, Love Generation, and Marianne & Michael etc.

Working with co-producer Paul Birmingham brought Muschler success with disco releases in Europe and North America during the 1970s. He composed the disco song "Don't Boogie Mr. Tango" for Ebony, a group featuring Isetta Preston, Jannette Kania and Judy Archer.

== Career ==
=== 1960s ===
During the 1960s, Muschler was a member of the Blackberries, a beat group that also included Oliver Freytag. They recorded a handful of singles from 1966 to 1968 that were released on the Stellina, Philips and Vogue Schallplatten labels.

=== 1970s ===
Working with co-writers Michael Kunze and Hans Bradtke, Muschler co-wrote the song "S-t-e-f-a-n" which was recorded by Marion Maerz. It peaked at no. 46 in Germany in 1972.

Muschler worked on Peter Maffay's 1973 Omen album, playing piano and handling the arrangements.

Muschler produced the Marion and Antony single, "Du gehst fort" which was released in Germany on Ariola 16 222 AT in 1975. It spent thirteen weeks in the German charts, peaking at no. 15. Working with Jackie Robinson the same year, he produced her recording of the Jean-Luc Drion Jack Donder composition, "Moving Like a Superstar". Backed with "Let Me Be" it was released on Ariola 89 749 XT in late 1975. It charted in Canada, making it to no. 82 on the RPM Weekly RPM Top 100 singles for the week of 3 July 1976. In the US it would eventually make it to no. 10 on the Dance chart and no. 61 on the R&B chart.

In 1976, he worked with Daffi Cramer, producing her single, "Charly, laß dir einen Bart steh'n" which was released on Ariola 16 780 AT. The single spent a total of nine weeks in the chart, peaking at no. 27.

In 1977 Jackie Robinson released her I'm Different album which was produced by Fritz Muschler and Paul Birmingham. Muschler had also composed half of the songs on the album. It was reviewed in the 14 May 1977 issue of RPM Weekly. With the successes that Birmingham and Muschler had in the past, the reviewer said that Robinson should be receiving a warm welcome in Canada.

He wrote the song "Don't Boogie Mr. Tango" for Ebony which was released in 1976. The song was performed on the Musikladen show on 11 December that year. It was also aired on the Notturno Italiano program. According to the 23 April 1977 issue of Music Week, it was released in most European countries.

Working with Daffi Cramer, Muschler produced her version of the song "Angelo, which was released on Ariola 11 620 AT.

Fritz Muschler and Paul Birmingham composed the song "Living on the Breadline" which was the B side of Ebony's 1978 single, "Then He Kissed Me".

=== 1980s ===
Muschler provided the music for the 1987 film, Hatschipuh which was directed by Ulrich König which starred Toni Berger, Adelheid Arndt and Henry van Lyck.

Working with Joe Kleindienst, Muschler co-produced the song "I'm on Fire" for Chalice. The cover version of the 1975 5000 Volts song was released in Austria on Koch Records International AS 145.447 and Musicata 2051 in Portugal in 1989.

=== 1990s - 2000s ===
Muschler composed the music for the film Pumuckl und sein Zirkusabenteuer which was released in 2003.

== Film and television music ==
=== Television shows ===
- Franz Xaver Brunnmayr - 1985 - composer (13 episodes)
- Master Eder and His Pumuckl - 1982 - 1989 - composer (52 episodes)
- Chiemgauer Volkstheater - 1992 - composer (1 episode)
- Die Fallers - Eine Schwarzwaldfamilie - 1994 - composer
- Pumuckls Abenteuer - 1999 - composer (9 episodes)

=== Film ===
- Meister Eder und sein Pumuckl - 1982 - composer
- Hatschipuh - 1987 - composer
- Ein Fall für TKKG - Drachenauge - 1992 - composer
- Pumuckl und der blaue Klabauter - 1994 - composer
- Visioner (TV movie) - 1998 - composer
- Pumuckl und sein Zirkusabenteuer - 2003 - composer
