= Im Wagen vor mir =

Single

"Im Wagen vor mir" (In the car in front of me) is a humorous song originally performed as a duet by Henry Valentino (whose real name is Hans Blum) and Uschi (later replaced with Daffi Cramer).

In the song, Valentino is driving on the autobahn, in the middle of a long trip, and day-dreaming about the woman in the car ahead of him—he wonders what she is like and what it would be like to know her. Meanwhile, the woman becomes increasingly worried about the man in the car behind her, wondering if he might be a policeman or a stalker. The humor arises from the fact that Valentino's character is in a very good mood, day-dreaming and listening to music, with no thought that he might be doing anything wrong, while the woman finally becomes so angry and upset that she exits the freeway before she wants to in order to get him to stop following her. In the original version, Valentino sings in a gravelly-voiced style similar to that of Tom Waits.

The song was only a minor hit when it was released in 1977, but its popularity has increased in the years since then, and it has been covered or parodied by numerous other artists.

== Die Roten Rosen cover ==
"Im Wagen vor mir"

Single by Die Roten Rosen

from the album Never Mind the Hosen, Here's Die Roten Rosen
- Released: 1987
- Genre: Punk rock
- Length: 3:28
- Label: Virgin Records
- Songwriter: Henry Valentino

Die Roten Rosen singles chronology
"Itsy Bitsy Teenie Weenie Honolulu-Strand-Bikini" (1987)	"Im Wagen vor mir" (1987)	"Alle Mädchen wollen küssen" (1987)

The song was covered by Die Toten Hosen ("The Dead Pants", a German punk rock group) for the 1987 cover album Never Mind the Hosen, Here's Die Roten Rosen. It was released as a single from the album, sometimes considered a double a-side single with "Halbstark" (Half-strong; originally by Jankees) under the alias Die Roten Rosen. In their version, although the lyrics are identical to the original, the humorous tone is replaced with an aggressive punk tone, making the man come across as a stalker.

The cover of the single is identical to the album cover, so the single may also be titled "Never Mind the Hosen, Here's Die Roten Rosen", which would rather make this a double a-side single, especially since "Halbstark" was later released on the best-of album Reich & sexy.

=== Track listing ===
1. "Im Wagen vor mir" − 3:28
2. "Halbstark" − 2:26

== Charts ==
Chart (1978)	Peak position
West Germany (GfK)	8
