= Adam & Eve (duo) =

German band

Adam & Eve was a German schlager music duo who had several hit records in Germany in the 1960s and 1970s. There are two incarnations of the duo.

== First incarnation ==
Eva Bartova (March 26, 1938, Bohemia - September 17, 1989, Chicago) emigrated to Germany in 1963, having studied classical ballet and voice in Czechoslovakia. She began recording with a group known as Eve Bartova & the Bartovs, where she met John Christian Dee (February 1944, Tonawanda - August 18, 2004, London), (Note: The birthplace is questionable.) an American who had moved to England in the 1950s. He became "Adam No. 1" in the new duo, Adam & Eve. They signed a recording contract in 1964 and released their first single in 1966. After a string of singles, some of which charted, they separated around the end of 1968.

== Second incarnation ==
Eve then joined the combo of Hartmut "Harry" Schairer (born February 23, 1946, Stuttgart), who became "Adam No. 2". They married in 1972 and became one of the best-known schlager duos in Germany. They divorced in 1982; Eve went on to marry singer Jimmy Harrison for a short time, but this marriage ended as well, and Eve then moved to America, where she died of cancer. Schairer went on to have a career as a composer and record producer; in 1998 he married the popular singer Gina Tielman, better known as Gina T.

== Discography ==
=== Albums ===
Adam & Eve (1):

- Paradise of Sounds (1967), Bellaphon

Adam & Eve (2):

- Die schönsten Lieder- DLP (1973), EMI
- Lieder aus Manuelas Taverne (1974), EMI-Hör Zu
- Wir beide (1975), EMI

=== Singles ===
- "They Can Look at Us and Laugh" (1966) (with Adam No. 1)
- "Hey, Hey in Tampico" (1970)
- "Wenn die Sonne erwacht in den Bergen" (1971)
- "Ave Maria no morro" (1971)
- "Das macht die Liebe allein" (1972)
- "Dann kommt der Sonnenschein" (1973)
- "In Manuels Taverne" (1974)
- "Du gehst fort (tu t'en vas)" (1975)
- "Lena (Steig in den Sattel...)" (1975)
- "Lailola" (1977)
- "Ungarische Nächte" (1977)
- "Die versunkene Stadt" (1978)
