= Lucy Neale =

American-German singer

- Also known as: Lucy O'Day
- Born: 24 January 1948 (age 78); Cleveland, Ohio, U.S.
- Genres: pop, disco
- Occupation: Singer-songwriter
- Years active: 1972 – present

Lucy Neale (also known as Lucy O'Day) is an American-German artist, notable for being one of the vocalists of the 1970s Silver Convention disco group.

== Life and career ==
Neale was born January 24, 1948, in Cleveland, Ohio. After graduating college, Neale traveled to Munich, West Germany to play part in the musical Hair. She later released her first single in Germany, "Nur Beim Träumen ( Sad Sweet Dreamer) / Komm Heim Zu Mir". Later that year in 1974, she was hired by Michael Kunze and Sylvester Levay to take part in the studio recording of Silver Convention as a vocalist. A year later, she joined the Love Generation group. During the 1970s, she provided backing vocals for several well-known artists, such as Donna Summer and Penny McLean. In 1980, she co-founded The Hornettes group along with former Silver Convention band member, Gitta Walther. Neale left Germany in 1985 and moved back to the United States to pursue her musical career there. She currently lives in San Diego, California, and is a member of girl group Moxie.
