= Charly, laß dir einen Bart steh'n =

Single by Daffi Cramer
- B-side: "Die Straße der Träume"
- Released: 1976
- Label: Ariola 16 780 AT
- Songwriter(s): Kongos/Behrle
- Producer(s): Fritz Muschler

"Charly, laß dir einen Bart steh'n" was a 1976 single for German songstress Daffi Cramer. It became a hit for her that year.

== Background ==
The song was written by Günther Behrle and John Kongos. The recording was produced by Fritz Muschler and released by Ariola Records in 1976. It was performed on ZDF-Hitparade on 31 July 1976.

The song appears on the compilation, Super 20 - Hit-Wirbel '77, released by Ariola in 1977.

== Charts ==
The song made the German charts, peaking at no. 27 and staying there for nine weeks.

== Other versions ==
Mandy Bach had success with her version of the song which she recorded in 2008.
