= Another Cycle =

Studio album by Jimmy Cliff
- Released: 1971
- Studio: Muscle Shoals (Alabama)
- Genre: Reggae
- Label: Island
- Producer: Guilly Bright

Jimmy Cliff chronology
Jimmy Cliff (1969)	Another Cycle (1971)	The Harder They Come (1972)

Professional ratings
Review scores
Source	Rating
AllMusic	2/5 stars
The Encyclopedia of Popular Music	3/5 stars

Another Cycle is an album by Jimmy Cliff, released in 1971.

== Production ==
The album was recorded at Muscle Shoals Sound Studio, in Alabama. "Sitting in Limbo" was used on the following year's The Harder They Come. Although recorded in the United States, the album was not released in the country.

== Critical reception ==
The Encyclopedia of Popular Music called the album "short on roots credibility." Wax Poetics wrote that the album "had some excellent material—Cliff’s earnest tenor nicely contrasted by the bluegrass soul of the Swampers—but despite containing classics such as 'Sitting in Limbo' and the title track, the album was widely panned, falling as it did between two camps and perhaps being too far from the Jamaican vibe that had driven Wonderful World."

== Track listing ==
All tracks composed by Guilly Bright and Jimmy Cliff; except where indicated

1. "Take a Look at Yourself"
2. "Please Tell me Why"
3. "The Rap"
4. "Opportunity Only Knocks Once"
5. "My Friend's Wife" (Guilly Bright)
6. "Another Cycle"
7. "Sitting in Limbo"
8. "Oh How I Miss You"
9. "Inside Out, Upside Down"
10. "Our Thing is Over" (Guilly Bright)

== Personnel ==
- Jimmy Cliff - vocals
- Guilly Bright - arranger, producer
- Roger Hawkins - drums
- David Hood - bass
- Jimmy Johnson - rhythm guitar
- Tippy Armstrong - lead guitar, string synthesizer, acoustic guitar, harmonica
- Barry Beckett - keyboards
- Eddie Hinton - acoustic guitar on "Take a Look at Yourself"

Technical

- Larry Henby, Steve Smith, Marlin Green - engineer
