= Ireen Sheer =

German-English singer (born 1949)

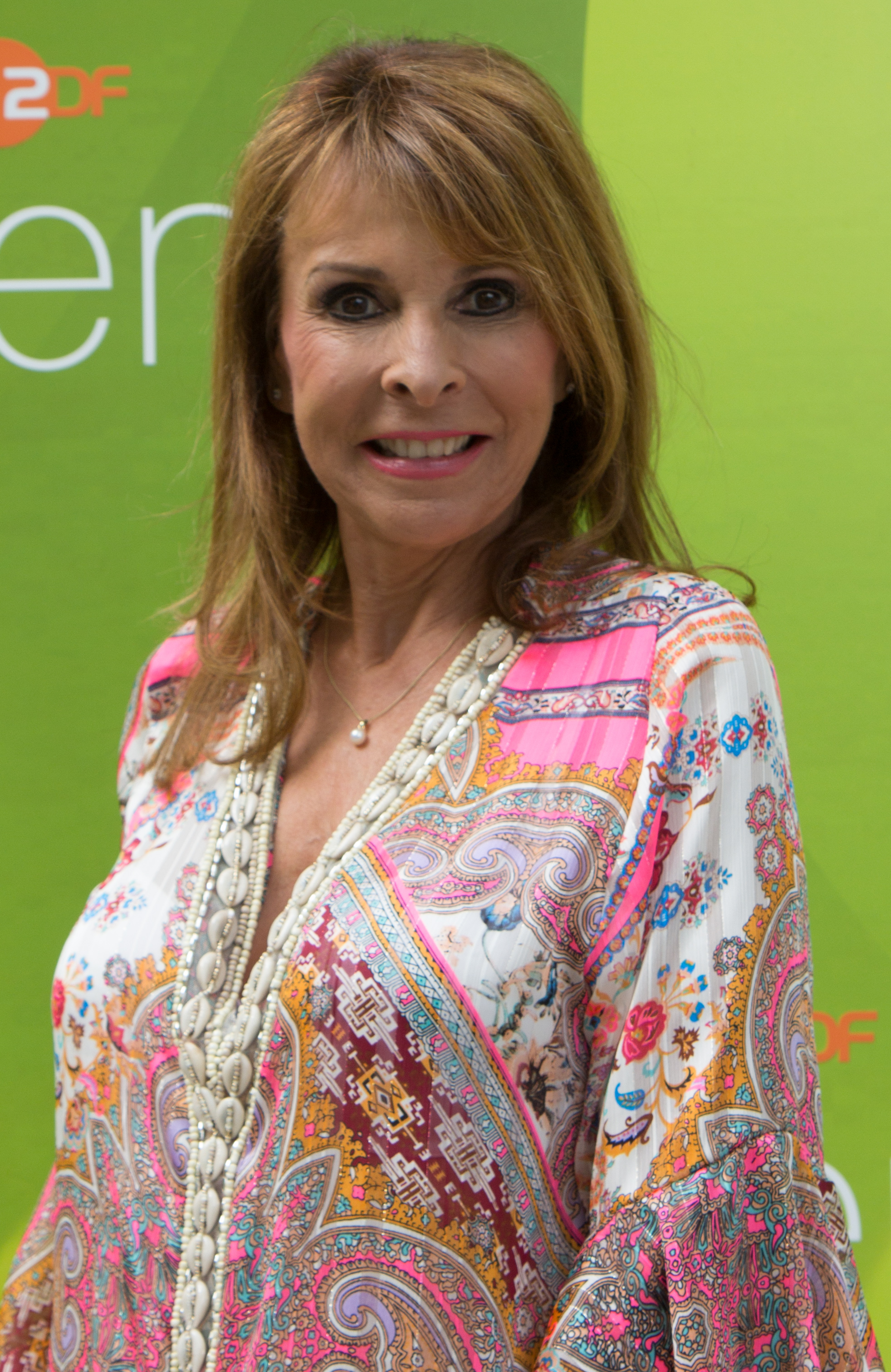
- Sheer in 2018

Background information
- Also known as: Ireen Sheer
- Born: Ireen Wooldridge; 25 February 1949 (age 77); Romford, England
- Genre: Pop
- Instrument: Vocalist
- Years active: 1960s–present
- Label: Firework Music
- Website: ireensheer.de

Ireen Sheer (born 25 February 1949) is a German-English singer. She had her first major hit in 1970 with Hey Pleasure Man. She had a top five hit on the German singles chart with "Goodbye Mama" in 1973. She went on to finish fourth at the Eurovision Song Contest 1974 representing Luxembourg, sixth at the Eurovision Song Contest 1978 representing Germany, and thirteenth at the Eurovision Song Contest 1985 representing Luxembourg again.

== Life and career ==
Born in Romford, England, Sheer spent her early years in Billericay, Essex in the U.K. where she attended The Billericay School. She was discovered at the beginning of the 1960s through a talent competition, but still took time to graduate from a bank apprenticeship in spite of her early success. She sang for several pop groups, such as The Family Dogg also was a member of Gullivers People (a resident band at Tiffany’s in London's 'West End' district) before she devoted herself from 1970 onwards to her solo career, focusing mainly on Germany. Her single, "Goodbye Mama", became a Top 5 hit on the German chart and a Number 2 on the Swiss chart in 1973. After that, she released numerous records, almost every one going on to become a hit in its own right. Sheer became a guest on several different television music-shows, including several appearances on ZDF Hitparade, one of Germany's most popular music programs.

In 1974, she represented Luxembourg in the Eurovision Song Contest, with "Bye Bye, I Love You" and finished in fourth place. Four years later, in 1978, she sang for Germany and finished sixth. In 1985, Sheer sang together with Annemieke Verdoorn (Margo), Franck Olivier, Chris Roberts, Diane Solomon and Malcolm Roberts, once more representing Luxembourg. However, their song "Children, Kinder, Enfants" finished in thirteenth place. She took part in the contest two other times, in which she did not progress beyond the German preliminaries or finals: in 1976 with "Einmal Wasser, einmal Wein" ("Once Water, Once Wine") and in a 2002 duet with Bernhard Brink, singing "Es ist niemals zu spät" ("It Is Never Too Late").

Besides her solo performances, Sheer also sang a number of duets with her ex-husband Gavin du Porter, and her colleague, Bernhard Brink. Over thirty years after her first hit, Sheer is still a well-known member of the pop music establishment in Germany, continuing to appear on music shows and release new albums and singles.

== Awards ==
Sheer has received several gold records for her work, and has twice received the German music award the Golden Tuning Fork, both in 1981 and 1993.

== Discography ==
=== Hit songs ===
- 1970 "Hey Pleasure Man"
- 1970 "Big Yellow Taxi"
- 1971 "Another Place Another Time"
- 1971 "Many Rivers"
- 1971 "Oh Holiday"
- 1972 "Keine liebt dich so wie ich"
- 1972 "Oh Love my Love"
- 1972 "Sonntag"
- 1972 "Ein glückliches Mädchen"
- 1972 "Wie ein Meer, das keine Ufer kennt"
- 1972 "Mitternacht"
- 1972 "Ich kann dich nie vergessen"
- 1972 "Eine weiß, was Liebe ist"
- 1972 "Mein bester Freund"
- 1972 "wer wird dich lieben"
- 1972 "Das alte Lied vom Glück"
- 1973 "Ein Mädchen und ein Mann"
- 1973 "Wenn jeder Tag ein Sonntag wär"
- 1973 "Kesse Küsse"
- 1973 "Wenn die Sonne scheint denkt keiner an den Regen"
- 1973 "Hinter jedem Fenster brennt ein Licht"
- 1973 "Ich bin so happy"
- 1973 "Ein Mädchenherz geht auf Reisen"
- 1973 "Goodbye Mama"
- 1973 "Ein kleines Haus"
- 1973 "Warum"
- 1973 "Und wenn die Sonne wieder scheint"
- 1974 "Bye Bye I Love You" Deutsche Version
- 1974 "Bye Bye I Love You" Englische Version
- 1974 "Many Rivers"
- 1974 "Sunday"
- 1974 "When you walked away"
- 1974 "Oh Lord"
- 1974 "I'm a Lady"
- 1974 "Is it me"
- 1974 "Newton Apple Tree"
- 1974 "Roseberry Avenue"
- 1974 "Hey Pleasure Man"
- 1974 "Nur noch einen Tanz"
- 1974 "Ade, ade"
- 1974 "Maskenball"
- 1974 "In mir klingt Musik"
- 1974 "Ein Sommer zu Haus"
- 1974 "Liebe ist die sonne des Lebens"
- 1974 "Hast du heute Abend etwas vor"
- 1974 "Deine Liebe ist mein Leben"
- 1974 "Wann wirst du für immer bei mir sein"
- 1974 "Thank You"
- 1975 "Ach lass mich noch einmal in Deine Augen seh'n"
- 1975 "Hinter dem weißen Berg"
- 1976 "Addio amore mio"
- 1976 "Der Sommer kam zu mir"
- 1976 "Einmal Wasser, einmal Wein"
- 1976 "Du bist das, was ich will"
- 1976 "Bye, Bye I Love You"
- 1976 "Thank you"
- 1977 "Du musst nicht weinen, Maria"
- 1977 "Mach die Augen zu"
- 1978 "Hey, Junge, sag das noch einmal"
- 1978 "Feuer"
- 1978 "Hey Junge, sag das noch einmal"
- 1979 "Hey, Mr. Musicman"
- 1979 "Sentimental Song"
- 1979 "Das Lied der schönen Helena"
- 1979 "Duwi-duwi-dum"
- 1979 "Ich habe angst, das zu erleben"
- 1979 "Alexander"
- 1979 "Amazing Grace"
- 1979 "Eine von vielen"
- 1979 "Spanish Gibsy"
- 1979 "Komm wieder"
- 1979 "Hey Mr. Musicman"
- 1979 "Wo soll denn die Liebe bleiben?"
- 1980 "Xanadu"
- 1980 "Spiel das nochmal"
- 1981 "Geh wenn du willst"
- 1981 "Liebe auf Eis" (with Gilbert Bècaud)
- 1981 "L'amour est Mort" (with Gilbert Bècaud)
- 1981 "Nur ein Clown versteckt die Tränen"
- 1982 "Erst wenn die Sonne nicht mehr scheint"
- 1983 "Ich hab Gefühle"
- 1984 "State of Emergency"
- 1985 "Children, Kinder, Enfants"
- 1985 "Hab ich dich heut Nacht verloren"
- 1986 "Wenn du eine Frau wärst und ich wär ein Mann"
- 1987 "Who's Sylvia?"
- 1988 "Ich bin da"
- 1989 "Liebe macht stark"
- 1989 "Die Frau, die bleibt"
- 1990 "Fantasy Island"
- 1991 "Seit du fort bist"
- 1991 "Ich bin da"
- 1991 "Verloren in den Flammen"
- 1991 "Liebe macht stark"
- 1991 "Ein neuer Frühling"
- 1991 "Nicht schon wieder"
- 1991 "Herzen ohne Heimat"
- 1991 "Heut Abend hab ich Kopfweh"
- 1992 "Du gehst fort" (with Bernhard Brink)
- 1993 "Wahnsinn"
- 1993 "Komm ich mach das schon"
- 1993 "Midnight Blue"
- 1993 "Lisa"
- 1993 "Das Sommerkleid"
- 1993 "Wo sind meine Träume"
- 1993 "Rote Rosen"
- 1993 "Das gewisse Etwas"
- 1993 "Schöner Mann"
- 1994 "Das gewisse Etwas"
- 1995 "African Blue"
- 1995 "Meine beste Freundin"
- 1995 "Lass dich fallen"
- 1995 "Nur manchmal in der Nacht"
- 1995 "Er kann nicht tanzen"
- 1995 "Xanadu"
- 1995 "Tanz mit mir"
- 1995 "Primaballerina"
- 1995 "The first Noel"
- 1996 "Der Hit auf Hit Mix"
- 1996 "Zwei Herzen ein Gedanke"
- 1996 "Prima Ballerina"
- 1995 "Nina Bobo"
- 1996 "Genau wie du"
- 1997 "Ich vermisse dich"
- 1997 "Solange Tanz ich allein"
- 1997 "Sommernachtsgefühle"
- 1997 "Genau wie du"
- 1997 "Mein Mann ist müd"
- 1997 "Lasst uns an Wunder glauben"
- 1997 "Schweigen brennt unter der Haut"
- 1997 "Hinter dem Lachen"
- 1997 "Solange tanz ich allein"
- 1997 "Nie mehr dich verliern"
- 1997 "Ich vermisse dich"
- 1997 "Wo soll denn die Liebee bleiben"
- 1997 "Ich hab niemals aufgehört, dich zu lieben"
- 1997 "Heute Nacht bist du da"
- 1998 "Sag ihr, ich lieb dich"
- 1998 "Männer wie du" (remix)
- 1998 "Für immer du"
- 1998 "You'll never walk alone"
- 1998 "Halt mich, bevor du gehst"
- 1998 "Ich brauch dich so sehr"
- 1998 "Weil du mein Leben bist"
- 1998 "Ein Kuss von dir"
- 1998 "Wieviel Träume hat die Sehnsucht"
- 1998 "Ich lieb dich bis in alle Ewigkeit"
- 1998 "Tennessee Waltz"
- 1998 "So wie du"
- 1998 "Wenn du mein Herz noch hörst"
- 1998 "Manchmal in der Nacht"
- 1999 "Lüg, wenn du kannst"
- 2000 "Ein Kuss von dir" ( English Lyrics )
- 2000 "Es liegt in deiner Hand"
- 2000 " Zwei linke Hände, zwei linke Schuh'"
- 2000 "Wenn du geh'n willst"
- 2000 "Ich kann für nichts garantiern"
- 2000 "Nimm mich nochmal in den Arm"
- 2000 "Irgendwo am Horizont"
- 2000 "Wenn schon will ich alles"
- 2000 "Hit Mix"
- 2000 "Frauen ab 40 sind der Hit"
- 2000 "Das schönste Gefühl der Welt"
- 2001 "Ich kann für nichts garantiern"
- 2001 "Alles was ich will, bist du"
- 2001 "wer kann dir schon wiederstehn"
- 2001 "Das tut so gut"
- 2001 "Und darum träum' ich mich zu dir"
- 2001 "Farewell and Goodbye"
- 2001 "Ich spür, dass du einsam bist"
- 2001 "Wenn du den Mond siehst (Can't fight the Moonlight)"
- 2001 "Es gibt kein nächstes Mal"
- 2001 "Irgendwo und irgendwann (Another Place, another Time)
- 2001 "Downtown" (deutsche Version)
- 2001 "Downtown" (engl. Version)
- 2001 "Ein bisschen Küssen, ein bischen Liebe"
- 2001 "Jede Nacht mit dir ist Wahnsinn"
- 2002 "Es ist niemals zu spät" (with Bernhard Brink)
- 2002 "Wenn du den Mond siehst"
- 2002 "Kein Wort zu viel"
- 2002 "Was kann ich denn dafür"
- 2002 "Schau mal herein"
- 2002 "Ich habe mich an dich verloren"
- 2002 "Ganz viel von dir"
- 2002 "Im Land der Träume"
- 2002 "Heute habe ich an dich gedacht"
- 2002 "Das kann niemand so wie du"
- 2003 "Ich bin stark"
- 2003 "Mambo in the Moonlight"
- 2003 "Schieß deine sorgen in den Wind"
- 2003 "Solang ein Herz aus Liebe schlägt"
- 2003 "Mit keinem einzigen Wort (When you say nothing at all)
- 2003 "Liebe ist hier"
- 2003 "Ich komm wieder (I'm still standing)
- 2003 "Mir geht's wieder richtig gut"
- 2003 "Ich träum mich frei"
- 2003 "A Domani Amore"
- 2003 "It's never to late"
- 2003 "Für dich heißt Leben zu lieben"
- 2003 "Music is my Life"
- 2004 "Ich komm wieder"
- 2004 "A domani Amore"
- 2004 "Ich hab den Himmel gesehn"
- 2005 "I do love you"
- 2005 Wenn die Sehnsucht dich berührt"
- 2005 "Dann träumst Du"
- 2005 "Wie schön dass du da bist"
- 2005 "Frauen ab 40 sind der Hit"
- 2005 "Bin wieder verliebt"
- 2005 "Und dann liege ich in deinen Armen"
- 2005 "Heut verkauf ich meinen Mann"
- 2005 "Ich hab den Himmel geseh'n"
- 2005 "Stark genug zu geh'n"
- 2005 "La bella Musica"
- 2006 "Bitte geh"
- 2006 "Du bist heut nacht nicht allein" (remix)
- 2006 "La bella bella Musica"
- 2006 "Du und ich"
- 2007 "Mein Weg zu dir"
- 2007 "Du bist heut Nacht nicht allein"
- 2007 "Und dann liege ich in deinen Armen"
- 2007 "Wir sind stark zu zweit"
- 2007 "Wenn die Liebe mein Herz berührt"
- 2007 "Ich bin wieder da"
- 2007 "Sag bitte nie Goodbye"
- 2007 "Tanz doch noch einmal mit mir"
- 2007 "Mit dir zusammen"
- 2007 "Mein Weg führt zu dir"
- 2007 "Wirst du immer bei mir sein"
- 2007 "Heute ist mein Tag"
- 2007 "Crying"
- 2008 "Bleib heute Nacht"
- 2008 "Time to say Goodbye"
- 2008 "Buona sera Cara mia"
- 2008 "Hand auf's Herz"
- 2008 "In die Sonne"
- 2008 "Seitdem du bei mir bist"
- 2008 "Musik, das ist mein Leben"
- 2008 "We are the Champions"
- 2008 "Frei wie der Wind"
- 2008 "Zeig mir den Weg"
- 2008 "Sag ja zum Leben"
- 2008 "Dann kamst Du"
- 2009 "Komm mit ins Winterwunderland"
- 2009 "Tief in der Nacht"
- 2009 "Mary's Boychild"
- 2009 "Stille Nacht, heilige Nacht"
- 2009 "Süßer die Glocken nie klingen"
- 2009 "Morgen Kinder wirds was geben"
- 2009 "Oh Tannenbaum"
- 2009 "White Christmas"
- 2009 "Oh du Fröhliche"
- 2009 "Leise rieselt der Schnee"
- 2010 "Als der Mond in Flammen stand"
- 2010 "Jeden Tag"
- 2010 "Verzeih my Love"
- 2010 "Dag bitte nicht nein"
- 2010 "Sailing"
- 2010 "Nur ein Flirt"
- 2010 "Für diesen Mann, dens garnicht gibt"
- 2010 "Ich kann für dich die Welt nicht ändern"
- 2010 "Männer wollen nur das Eine"
- 2010 "Ach lass mich noch einmal (in deine Augen sehn)
- 2012 "Maybe tonight" (with The Rattles)
- 2012 "Du bist mehr als du sehn kannst"
- 2012 "It's now or never"
- 2012 "Komm doch mal rein"
- 2012 "Wir dreh'n die Zeit zurück"
- 2012 "Regen an einem Sonntag"
- 2012 "Schön, dass es dich gibt (+Sascha Klaar)
- 2012 "Leg deine Hände in meine Hände"
- 2012 "Shalala"
- 2012 "Manchmal"
- 2012 "Okey Dokey - alles klar"
- 2012 "Wenn ich von dir Träume"
- 2012 "Mehr als nur perfekt"
- 2012 "Ich glaube an Engel"
- 2012 "Nimm meine Hand"
- 2013 "Ich liebe Sonne, Palmen"
- 2013 "Zumba, Zumba, Zumba"
- 2013 "Sunshine in the Rain"
- 2013 "was ist dir die Liebe wert"
- 2013 "Wahnsinn " POP MIX
- 2013 "Klingelingeling"
- 2015 "Showtime"
- 2015 "Der perfekte Moment"
- 2015 "Zeit zum Leben"
- 2015 "Heiß und kalt"
- 2015 "Wo sind nur die Tage geblieben"
- 2015 "Was kostet die Welt" (+ Ross Antony)
- 2015 "Vertrau auf dein Gefühl"
- 2015 "Herz aus Gold"
- 2015 "Xanadu"
- 2015 "Wie ein Feuerwerk"
- 2015 "Ich werde Tanzen geh'n"
- 2015 "Diamanten"
- 2015 "Mit dem Herzen einer Frau"
- 2018 "Du bist mein allergrößter Fehler"
- 2018 "Was du nicht weißt"
- 2019 "Celebrar uma festa - DJ MIX"
- 2019 "Hello Mr. Universe"
- 2019 "Heut' Abend hab' ich Kopfweh 2019"
- 2019 "Ich muss mir nichts mehr beweisen"
- 2019 "Keiner lässt mich fliegen so wie du"
- 2019 "Männergrippe"
- 2019 "Memories"
- 2019 "Schön, dass es dich gibt (+ Patrick Lindner)"
- 2019 "Tennessee Waltz 2019"
- 2019 "was du nicht weißt"
- 2019 "Wie ein Feuerwerk MF - FOX Remix"
- 2019 "Xanadu 2019 (+ Ross Antony)"

=== Covers ===
In 1970 the Swedish singer Barbro "Lill-Babs Svensson had a hit with a Swedish version of "Hey Pleasure Man" - Hopplösa karl.

=== Albums ===
- 1972 Keine liebt dich so wie ich
- 1973 Wenn jeder Tag ein Sonntag wär
- 1974 Ireen Sheer`s English Favorites
- 1974 Nur noch einen Tanz
- 1975 Addio amore Mio
- 1976 Du bist das, Was ich will
- 1977 Goodbye Mama
- 1978 Hey Junge, sag das noch einmal
- 1979 Ireen Sheer
- 1989 Star Portrait
- 1991 Ireen Sheer
- 1993 Das gewisse Etwas
- 1995 Liebe Macht Stark
- 1995 Tanz mit mir
- 1995 Ireen Sheer - Einfach das Beste
- 1996 Premium Gold Collection
- 1996 Star Collection
- 1997 Ich vermisse dich
- 1998 Weil Du mein Leben bist
- 2000 Ein Kuß von dir
- 2001 Zeitlos
- 2002 Es ist niemals zu spät
- 2003 Leben heißt lieben
- 2003 Ireen Sheer Gestern & Heute
- 2004 Land der Liebe
- 2005 Bin wieder verliebt
- 2007 Mein Weg zu dir
- 2007 Hit Collection
- 2008 Frei
- 2009 Weihnachten mit Ireen Sheer
- 2010 Männer
- 2012 Heller Als Die Sterne
- 2013 Jetzt oder nie
- 2014 Glanzlichter
- 2015 Showtime
- 2019 Ich muss mir nichts mehr beweisen
- 2022 Auf Wiedersehn – Goodbye

Preceded by Anne-Marie David with Tu te reconnaîtras	Luxembourg in the Eurovision Song Contest; 1974	Succeeded by Geraldine with Toi
Preceded by Silver Convention with Telegram	Germany in the Eurovision Song Contest; 1978	Succeeded by Dschinghis Khan with Dschinghis Khan
Preceded by Sophie Carle	Luxembourg in the Eurovision Song Contest; 1985	Succeeded by Sherisse Laurence
