= Hans Blum (musician) =

German singer (1928–2024)

- Also known as: Henry Valentino
- Born: 23 May 1928; Hannover, Germany
- Origin: Linden, Hannover
- Died: 15 March 2024 (aged 95) Overath, North Rhine-Westphalia, Germany
- Genres: Pop music, schlager
- Occupation: Musician
- Instrument(s): Vocals, piano
- Years active: 1948–2024
- Labels: Sony Music, Zett

Hans Blum (23 May 1928 – 15 March 2024), also known as Henry Valentino, was a German singer-songwriter known for his distinctive musical style, which has been the inspiration of a generation of German musicians. His recordings include the hit single "Im Wagen vor mir."

== Career ==
He wrote and conducted three entries that represented Germany in the Eurovision Song Contest: "Anouschka" (performed by Inge Brück in 1967), "Primaballerina" (performed by Siw Malmkvist in 1969), and "Über die Brücke geh'n" (performed by Ingrid Peters in 1986).

He had a hit in 1977 with "Im Wagen vor mir" which was a duet with Uschi. Uschi died and Valentino re-recorded the song with Daffi Cramer.

== Death ==
Blum died on 15 March 2024, at the age of 95.

== Discography ==
Major studio albums:

- 1991: Im Wagen vor mir
- 1997: ...Etwas für Liebhaber
- 1999: Zu Zweit Macht's Mehr Spass
- 2001: Henry Valentino's Hitbox
- 2004: Ich Hab' Dein Knie Geseh'n
- 2006: Eine Liebe Ist Wie ein Lied

== Influence ==
Hans Blum has been a major inspiration for a long range of German musicians and has enjoyed an extensive international recognition for the hit single "Im Wagen vor mir".

== See also ==
- List of best selling music artists

Media offices
Preceded by (Germany) Willy Berking	Eurovision Song Contest conductor 1967	Succeeded by (Germany) Horst Jankowski
Preceded by (Germany) Horst Jankowski	Eurovision Song Contest conductor 1969	Succeeded by (Germany) Christian Bruhn
Preceded by (Germany) Rainer Pietsch	Eurovision Song Contest conductor 1986	Succeeded by (Germany) Laszlo Bencker
