= Bernd Clüver =

German singer

Bernd Clüver (10 April 1948 – 28 July 2011) was a German singer.

== Background ==
Clüver became a famous German Schlager singer in Germany and had several hits during the 1970s. His best-known song is perhaps Der Junge mit der Mundharmonika which placed No. 1 in German Charts during 1973.

A lot of his work was produced by Peter Orloff during the 1970s and early 1980s.

== Career ==
By early December, 1979, the Aladin record label had extended its distribution pact and a Bernd Clüver release was one of the products being released.

== Death ==
In 2011 Clüver died after falling down the stairs in his home in Mallorca and was buried at sea.

== Awards ==
- 1973 Goldene Europa
- 1974 Goldene Europa
- 1981: Goldene Stimmgabel
- 1985: Goldene Stimmgabel
- 1991: Goldene Stimmgabel
