= Don Adams (R&B singer) =

Scottish singer (1942–1995)

- Born: Hector Reay MacKay; 3 July 1942
- Died: 13 June 1995 (aged 52)
- Genres: Jazz, blues, soul
- Labels: Ariola, Liberty, Orange, Sunset Records, Belter, United Artists, Jupiter, Polydor

Don Adams MacKay (3 July 1942 - 13 June 1995) was born Hector Reay MacKay. He was a Scottish-born rhythm and blues singer from Glasgow who moved to Munich in the 1960s to perform in a production of the musical Hair.

== Background ==
He was the youngest of eight children in a working-class family and later adopted the name Donald or Don. In his youth, he developed a passion for boxing.

While in Munich, Adams recorded two albums, Watts Happening (1969) and The Black Voice (1972), with his backing group of German jazz musicians on the United Artists Records label. He was a member of Love Generation and then Les Humphries Singers.

== Career ==
Don Adams & The Flying Scotch were active in Germany in the early 1960s, touring jazz and blues clubs, particularly performing in GI clubs of the US armed forces. During this time, he recorded the Jessie Hill song Oop Poo Pah Doo with the band The Flying Scotch; in 1965, the track was released on the Metronome label under that name, with Sweet and Sour Tears on the B-side, credited to Don Adams.

At the end of the 1960s, he toured Germany with the musical project Hair, after which he settled in Munich. There, he briefly sang with the band The Mochos and became part of the jazz scene at the venue Domicile, where he met Olaf Kübler and other musicians. Through spontaneous jam sessions, he earned a reputation as the "black voice of Munich".

It was reported in the 17 January 1970 issue of Record World that Adams had lost his left eye during a performance in a German nightclub. He also had a single released on the Orange label which was distributed in Germany by EMI. The record had picked up as well.

After Joe Kienemann left the vocal group Love Generation, Adams took over his position in the quintet. He later joined the Les Humphries Singers. His participation in Love Generation recordings and his association with Les Humphries Singers are documented in music databases and release credits.

In 1972, Adams released his The Black Voice album on the United Artists label. One of the songs on the album was his version of "Miss Lady".

In 1977, Peter Herbolzheimer featured him on the album Touchdown with his Rhythm Combination & Brass.

His album Watts Happening was reissued in 2007.

== Death ==
He later lived in London with his wife Anna MacKay. Together they had two children, Heather MacKay in 1989 and Donald MacKay in 1991.

He died as a result of cirrhosis in London in 1995.
