= Jimmy Cliff =

Jamaican musician (1944–2025)

The Honourable Jimmy Cliff OM
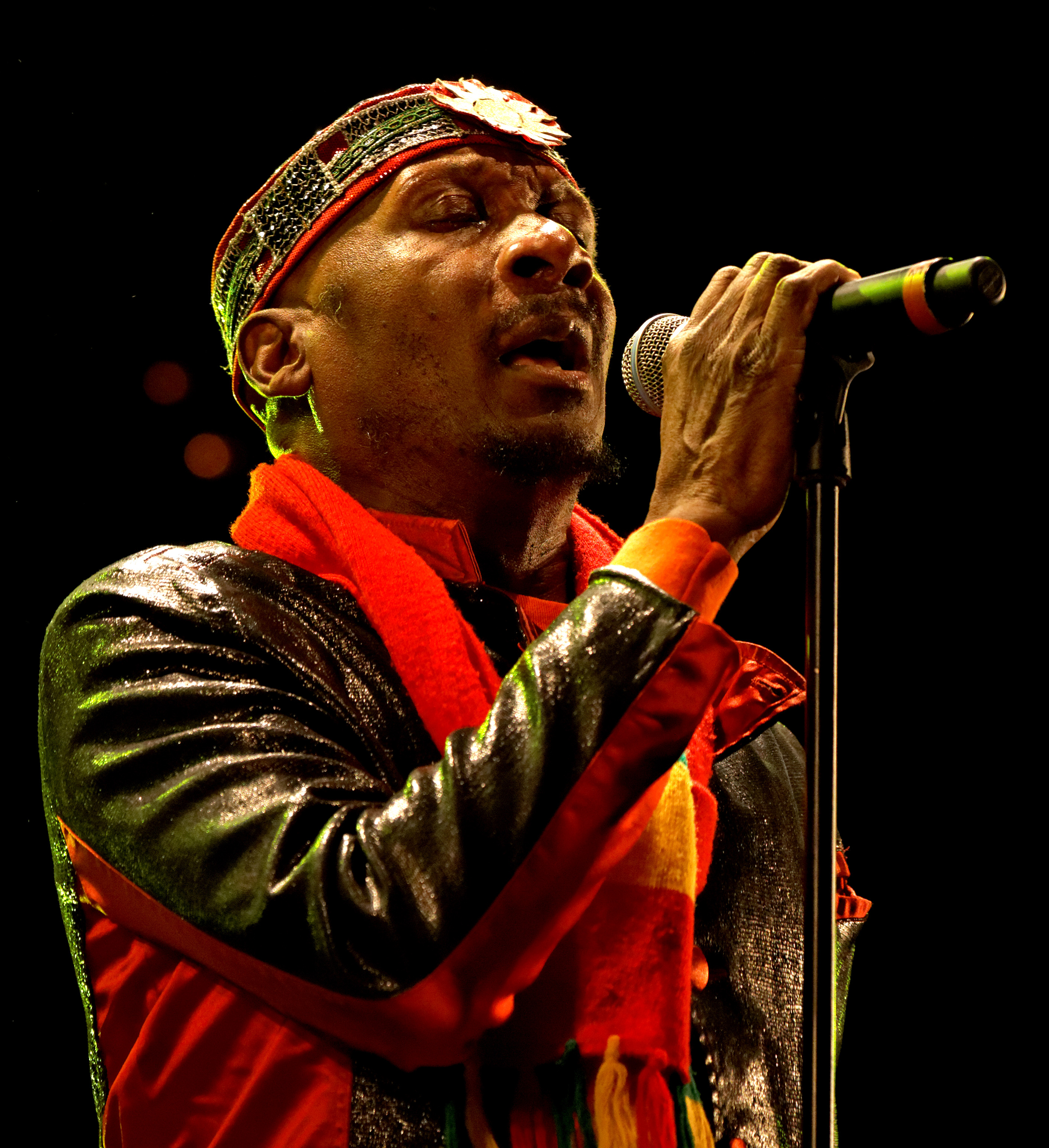
- Cliff performing in 2012

Background information
- Born: James Ezekiel Chambers; 30 July 1944; St. James, Colony of Jamaica, British Empire
- Died: 24 November 2025 (aged 81) Kingston, Jamaica
- Genres: Ska; rocksteady; reggae; soul
- Occupations: Singer; musician; songwriter
- Instruments: Vocals; guitar; piano; conga; keyboards
- Years active: 1962–2025
- Labels: Island; JAD; Trojan; Columbia; EMI; CBS
- Website: jimmycliff.com

James Ezekiel Chambers (30 July 1944 – 24 November 2025), known professionally as Jimmy Cliff, was a Jamaican ska, rocksteady, reggae and soul musician. He was considered to be one of Jamaica's most celebrated musicians and was credited with helping to popularise reggae music internationally. At the time of his death, he was the 4th reggae musician to hold the Order of Merit, the highest honour granted by the Jamaican government for achievements in the arts and sciences. He was also nominated seven times for the Grammy Awards, winning twice.

Cliff starred in The Harder They Come (1972), the first major commercial film from Jamaica. The soundtrack helped to make reggae widely known. He was known for such songs as "Many Rivers to Cross", "If I Follow My Mind", "You Can Get It If You Really Want", "The Harder They Come", "Reggae Night", and his covers of Cat Stevens's "Wild World", Johnny Nash's "I Can See Clearly Now" (from the Cool Runnings soundtrack) and "Hakuna Matata". Cliff was one of five performers inducted into the Rock and Roll Hall of Fame in 2010. He was one of only two Jamaicans in the Hall of Fame, the other being Bob Marley.

Jimmy Cliff made deliberate, multifaceted efforts to reach across cultural and racial lines and appeal to a mainstream audience. He pursued strategic record deals that gave him access to the primarily white UK market, covered well-known pop and rock songs such as Cat Stevens' "Wild World", which reached number eight on the UK Singles Chart in 1970, and placed his music in popular films including the 1988 hit Cocktail, which featured his song "Shelter of Your Love". Through these efforts Cliff reached a broader global audience while remaining true to his reggae roots, and was widely credited with helping to popularize reggae worldwide.

== Early life and education ==
Jimmy Cliff was born James Chambers on 30 July 1944 in Saint James, Colony of Jamaica, the second youngest of nine children. He began writing songs while still at primary school in St. James, listening to a neighbour's sound system. When he was 14 years old his father took him to Kingston, where he adopted the stage name Jimmy Cliff, "an allusion to the career heights he hoped to scale."

== Career ==
=== 1960s and 1970s ===
Cliff sought out producers while he was still at school, trying without success to get his songs recorded, and he entered talent contests. "One night I was walking past a record store and restaurant as they were closing, pushed myself in and convinced one of them, Leslie Kong, to go into the recording business, starting with me", Cliff wrote in his own website biography. After two singles that failed to make much impression, his career took off when "Hurricane Hattie" became a hit when he was 17. The record was produced by Kong, with whom Cliff remained until Kong's death from a heart attack in 1971.

Cliff's later local hit singles included "King of Kings", "Dearest Beverley", "Miss Jamaica", and "Pride and Passion". In 1964 he was chosen as one of Jamaica's representatives at the 1964 New York World's Fair. That same year Cliff was featured in a program called This is Ska! alongside Prince Buster, Toots and the Maytals, and Byron Lee and the Dragonaires.

He signed to Island Records and moved to the United Kingdom. Island Records initially (and unsuccessfully) tried to sell Cliff to the rock audience. His career took off in the late 1960s and his international debut album, Hard Road to Travel, was released in 1967. It received excellent reviews and included "Waterfall" (composed by Nirvana's Alex Spyropoulos and Patrick Campbell-Lyons), which became a hit in Brazil and won the International Song Festival.

"Waterfall" was followed in 1969 by "Wonderful World, Beautiful People" and "Vietnam" in 1970, both popular throughout most of the world. He released "Many Rivers to Cross" about his struggles with the music industry in 1969. The song was covered by many other artists including Cher, UB40, and John Lennon. Cliff also released a cover of Cat Stevens's "Wild World" as a single.

In 1972, Cliff starred as Vincent "Ivanhoe" Martin (known as Rhyging) in Perry Henzell's classic reggae film The Harder They Come. As the film tells Martin's story, he is a young man without funds. Arriving in Kingston from the country, he tries to make it in the recording business but without success. Eventually he turns to a life of crime. The soundtrack album sold well around the world, bringing reggae to an international audience for the first time. When it was released the film broke box office records in Jamaica and remains one of the most internationally significant films to have come out of Jamaica since the nation's independence from the United Kingdom. The film made its debut at London's Gaumont cinema in Notting Hill on 1 September 1972. Paul Simon recorded "Mother and Child Reunion" with Cliff's backing band.

In 1976, Cliff sang "The Harder They Come", "Many Rivers to Cross" and "Wahjahka Man" on the first season of Saturday Night Live, episode 12, hosted by Dick Cavett. After a series of albums, Cliff took a break and travelled to Africa. The Nigeria-based Jamaican writer Lindsay Barrett was instrumental in his first trip there and subsequently converted to Islam, taking the name of El Hadj Naïm Bachir.

=== 1980s and 1990s ===
Cliff returned to music and toured for several years before recording with Kool & the Gang. He had a big hit with "Reggae Night" in 1983. In 1984, he appeared at the Pinkpop Festival in Landgraaf, Netherlands. During The River Tour, Bruce Springsteen and the E Street Band added Cliff's previously little-known song "Trapped" to their live set. It achieved greater prominence when it was included on 1985's We Are the World benefit album. The follow-up, Cliff Hanger (1985), won a Grammy Award for Best Reggae Album. It was his last major success in the United States until 1993. Also in 1985, Cliff contributed to the song "Sun City", a protest song written and composed by Steven Van Zandt and recorded by Artists United Against Apartheid to express opposition to the South African policy of apartheid.

Cliff provided backing vocals on The Rolling Stones' 1986 album Dirty Work. He co-starred in the comedy Club Paradise with Robin Williams and Peter O'Toole and contributed several songs to the soundtrack, duetting with Elvis Costello on "Seven Day Weekend". Cliff toured North America with Steve Winwood for two months as the opening act during August–October 1986. His song "Shelter of Your Love" was featured in the 1988 film Cocktail.

Cliff appeared in the film Marked for Death in 1990, performing "John Crow" with the Jimmy Cliff Band. His recording of "You Can Get It If You Really Want" was used as a campaign anthem by the Sandinista National Liberation Front in the 1990 election in Nicaragua. In 1991, he performed at the second Rock in Rio festival in Estádio do Maracanã in Rio de Janeiro, Brazil. He continued to sell well in Jamaica and to a lesser extent in the UK, returning to the mainstream pop charts in the US and elsewhere (#1 in France) with a version of Johnny Nash's "I Can See Clearly Now" on the Cool Runnings soundtrack in 1993. In 1995, Cliff released a collaboration with Lebo M, the single "Hakuna Matata", a song from the soundtrack of The Lion King.

=== 2000 to 2025 ===
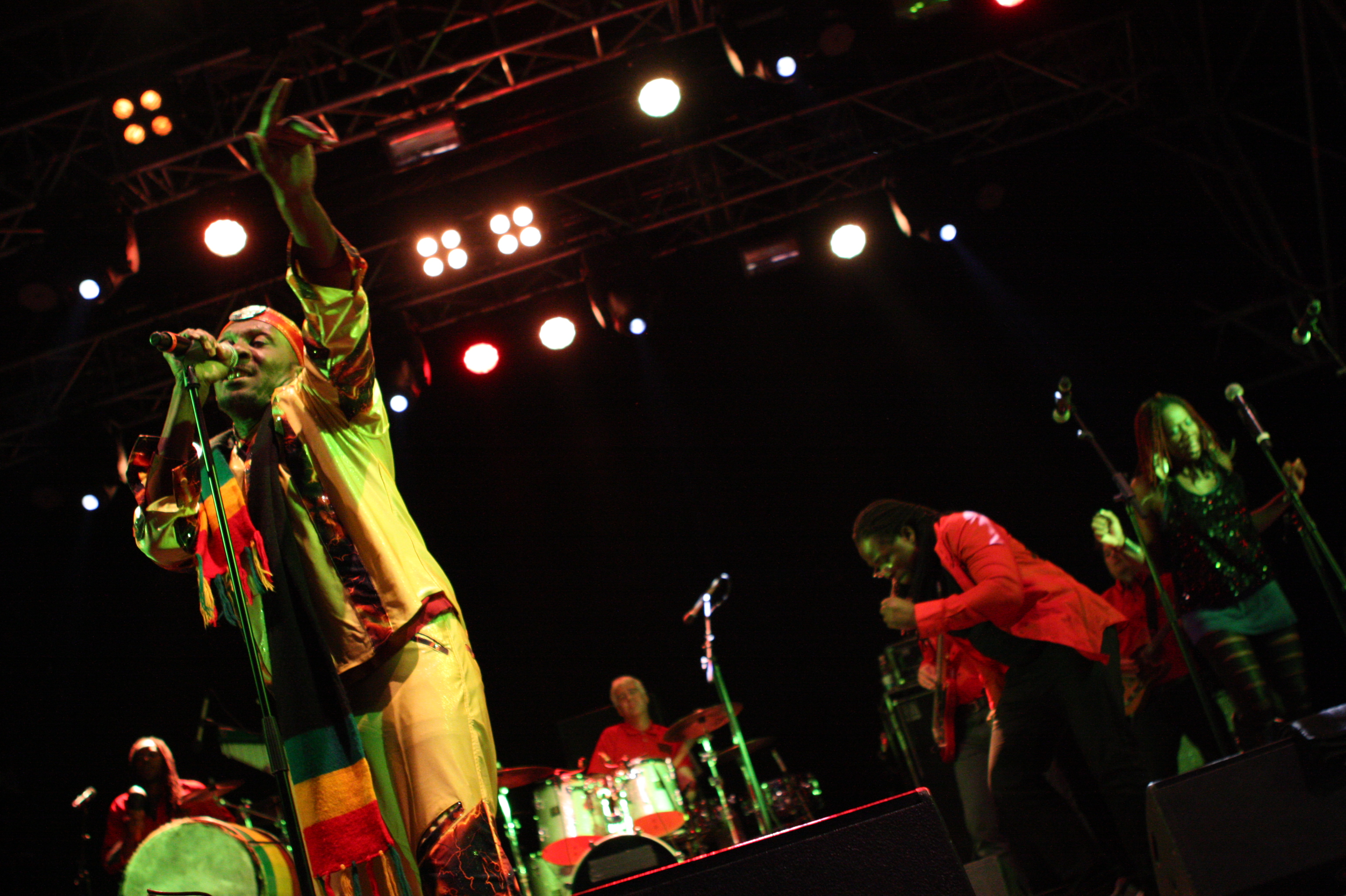
Cliff performing in Bildein, Austria, 2012

In 2001, Cliff became an inaugural member of the Independent Music Awards' judging panel to support independent artists. In 2002 he released the album Fantastic Plastic People in Europe, after first providing free downloads using p2p software. This album featured collaborations with Joe Strummer, Annie Lennox, and Sting, as well as new songs that were reminiscent of Cliff's original hits. In 2004, Cliff completely reworked the songs, dropping the reggae in favour of an electronic sound, for inclusion in Black Magic. The album also included a recording of "Over the Border" with Strummer. Cliff performed at the closing ceremony to the 2002 Commonwealth Games. In 2003, "You Can Get It If You Really Want" was included in the soundtrack to the film Something's Gotta Give. He appeared in July 2003 at the Paléo Festival in Nyon, Switzerland. The Jamaican government under P. J. Patterson honoured Cliff on 20 October 2003 by awarding him The Order of Merit, the nation's fourth-highest honour, in recognition of his contributions to the film and music of Jamaica.

Cliff performed at the opening ceremony of the 2007 Cricket World Cup. That year, "You Can Get It If You Really Want" was adopted by the British Conservative Party during their annual conference. He was quoted in The Independent as saying: "One of my band mates called me this morning to tell me the news. I can't stop them using the song, but I'm not a supporter of politics. I have heard of Cameron, but I'm not a supporter. I don't support any politician. I just believe in right or wrong."

In September 2009, Cliff was nominated for induction into the Rock and Roll Hall of Fame, following a campaign on his behalf by the American Charles Earle. Cliff reacted to the news by saying, "This is good for Cliff, good for Jamaican music and good for my country." On 15 December 2009, he was announced as an inductee and was inducted on 15 March 2010 by Wyclef Jean. Cliff is one of only two Jamaicans in the Hall of Fame, the other being Bob Marley. In the spring and summer of 2010 he embarked on an extensive tour of the U.S. and Canada.

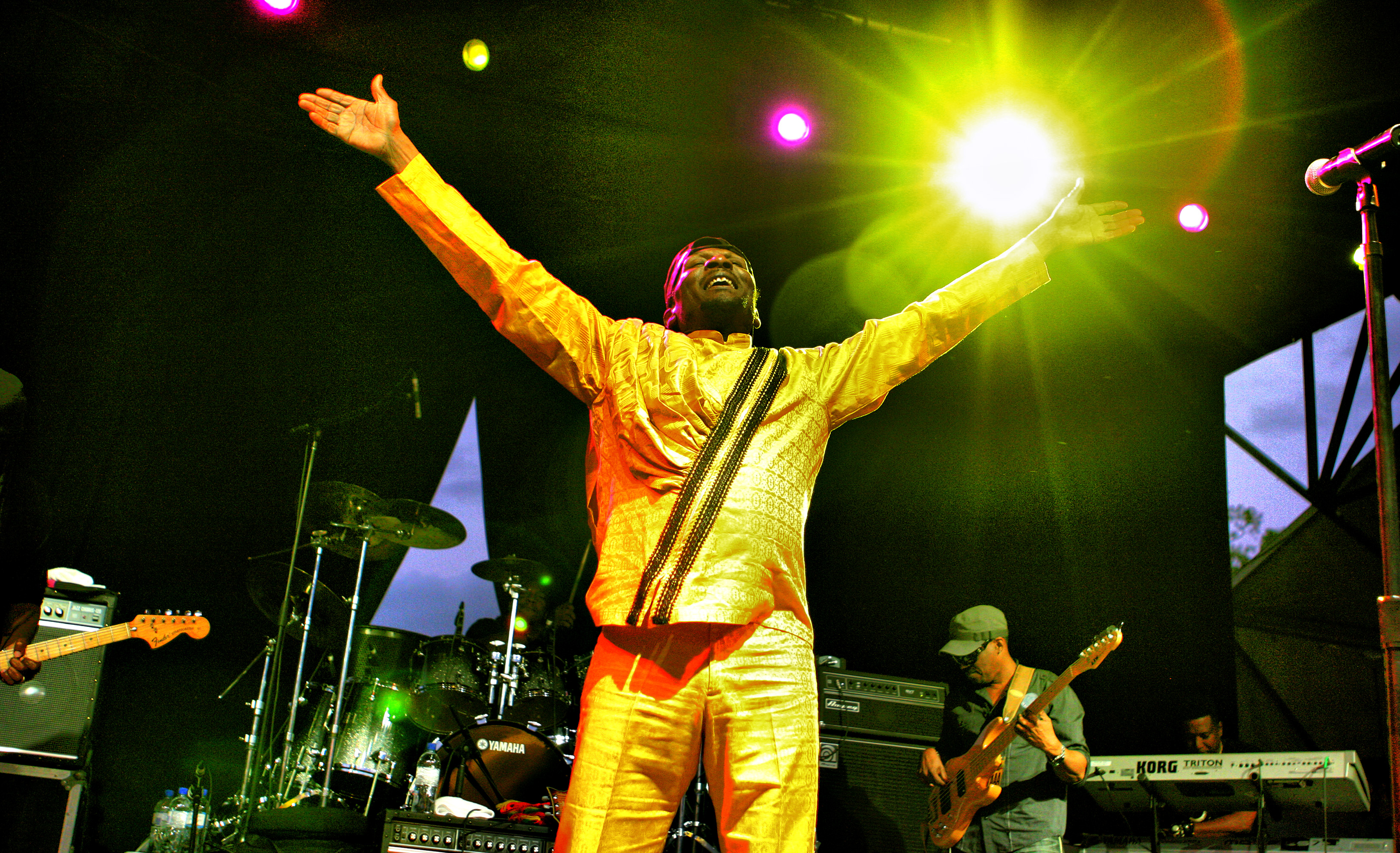
Cliff performing at Raggamuffin Music Festival

Cliff appeared in the 2011 documentary Reggae Got Soul: The Story of Toots and the Maytals, which was featured on BBC. In 2011, Cliff worked with producer Tim Armstrong, lead singer of American punk band Rancid, on the EP The Sacred Fire and the full-length album Rebirth. Rebirth won a Grammy Award for Best Reggae Album. The album was listed at number 12 on Rolling Stone magazine's list of the top 50 albums of 2012 with the description: "There's ska, rock steady, roots reggae, a revelatory cover of The Clash's 'Guns of Brixton' delivered in Cliff's trademark soulful tenor, grittier but still lovely more than 40 years after his debut."

In December 2012, Cliff was named Artist of the Year by digital newspaper Caribbean Journal, citing his work on Rebirth. In August 2022, Cliff released the album Refugees.

== Personal life and death ==
Cliff was briefly a member of the Rastafari movement before converting to Islam from Christianity. In a 2013 interview, he said he had a "universal outlook on life" and did not align himself with any particular movement or religion, adding, "now I believe in science". Cliff was married and had several children. From a relationship with the British film director Bluette Abrahams he fathered a daughter, Odessa Chambers. From his marriage to Latifa Chambers, a daughter Lilty and son Aken. In 1992 he became the father to the Brazilian actress/singer Nabiyah Be through a relationship with the psychologist Sônia Gomes.

On 24 November 2025, Cliff's wife announced that he had died that morning from pneumonia. He had been hospitalised following a seizure. He was 81. Prime Minister Andrew Holness, in a public statement after his death, said that Cliff's music "lifted people through hard times, inspired generations, and helped to shape the global respect that Jamaica enjoys today."

== Legacy ==
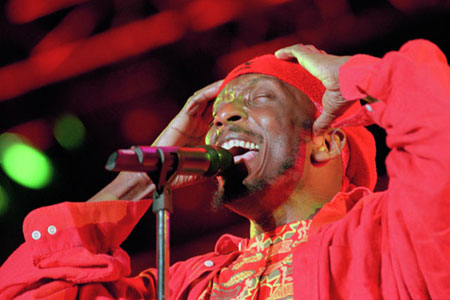
Cliff performing in 1997

Cliff was considered one of Jamaica's most celebrated musicians and is credited with having helped to popularise reggae internationally. He was briefly described as rivalling Bob Marley as the most prominent musician in the genre. Writing for The Guardian, David Katz called him an "itinerant ambassador who introduced the music and culture of his island to audiences across the globe", and the Rock and Roll Hall of Fame's website described him as "reggae's first champion". Bob Dylan called "Vietnam" the best protest song he had ever heard. Cliff was nominated for the Grammy Awards seven times and won twice, both wins being for Best Reggae Album. He also received the Order of Merit, the country's highest honor for the arts and sciences.

Cliff's role in The Harder They Come received praise and the film's soundtrack was credited with spreading reggae music's influence outside of Jamaica. The film was also the first major commercial film release from the country. The Grammy Awards, in an appraisal of the soundtrack fifty years after the film's release, wrote that his performance was "riveting and authentic", while recognizing that parts of the film were based on things Cliff had personally seen. In 2020, the soundtrack was added to the United States Library of Congress's National Recording Registry. Cliff recalled, "When someone comes up to me and says, 'I was a dropout in school and I heard your song "You Can Get It If You Really Want", and that song made me go back to school, and now I am a teacher and I use your song with my students' — that, for me, is a big success."

== Discography ==
This is a list of Cliff's main albums, compilations and singles.

=== Albums ===
Year	Title	Peak positions								Certification
Year	Title	FRA	NLD	NZ	SWE	SWI	UK	US	US Reggae	Certification
1967	Hard Road to Travel^{[A]}	—	—	—	—	—	—	—	—	
1968	Jimmy Cliff in Brazil^{[B]}	—	—	—	—	—	—	—	—	
1969	Jimmy Cliff^{[C]}	—	—	—	—	—	—	—	—	
1971	Goodbye Yesterday^{[D]}	—	—	—	—	—	—	—	—	
1971	Another Cycle	—	—	—	—	—	—	—	—	
1972	The Harder They Come	—	—	—	5	—	—	140	—	
1973	Unlimited^{[E]}	—	—	—	—	—	—	—	—	
1973	Struggling Man^{[F]}	—	—	—	—	—	—	—	—	
1974	Music Maker^{[G]}	—	—	—	—	—	—	—	—	
1975	Brave Warrior	—	—	—	—	—	—	—	—	
1975	Follow My Mind	—	—	—	—	—	—	195	—	
1978	Give Thankx	—	—	—	—	—	—	—	—	
1980	I Am the Living	—	—	—	—	—	—	—	—	
1981	Give the People What They Want	—	—	—	—	—	—	—	—	
1982	Special	—	29	—	—	—	—	186	—	
1983	The Power and the Glory	17	29	25	—	—	—	—	—	FRA: Gold
1985	Cliff Hanger	—	—	—	—	—	—	—	—	
1987	Hanging Fire	—	—	—	—	—	—	—	—	
1987	Shout for Freedom	—	—	—	—	—	—	—	—	
1989	Images	—	—	—	—	—	—	—	—	
1992	Breakout^{[H]}	—	—	—	—	—	—	—	—	
1996	Higher & Higher^{[I]}	8	—	—	—	—	—	—	—	FRA: Gold
1998	Journey of a Lifetime	—	—	—	—	—	—	—	—	
1999	Humanitarian	—	—	—	—	—	—	—	—	
2002	Fantastic Plastic People	—	—	—	—	—	—	—	—	
2004	Black Magic	139	—	—	—	—	—	—	11	
2012	Rebirth	—	—	—	—	71	83	76	1	
2022	Refugees	—	—	—	—	—	—	—	—	

Notes

- A. Hard Road to Travel was released as Can't Get Enough of It in Jamaica in 1968 with minor changes in track listing.
- B. Jimmy Cliff in Brazil consisted of new recordings as well as songs from Hard Road to Travel and Can't Get Enough of It. It was re-released in 1994.
- C. Jimmy Cliff was released as Wonderful World, Beautiful People in the US in 1970.
- D. Goodbye Yesterday was released as Two Worlds in Jamaica with minor changes in track listing.
- E. Unlimited was re-released as The King of Reggae in 1976.
- F. Struggling Man consisted of new recordings as well as songs from Wild World.
- G. Music Maker was released as House of Exile in some territories.
- H. Breakout was re-released as Samba Reggae in some territories in 1999 with minor changes in track listing.
- I. Higher & Higher consists of new recordings as well as previously released material.

=== Compilations and live albums ===
Year	Title	Peak positions					Certification
Year	Title	BEL (Wa)	FRA	GER	SWE	US Reggae	Certification
1975	The Best of Jimmy Cliff	—	—	—	—	—	
1975	Pop Chronik	—	—	—	—	—	
1976	In Concert: The Best of Jimmy Cliff	—	—	—	21	—	
1979	Oh Jamaica	—	—	—	—	—	
1981	Collection	—	—	—	—	—	
1982	Reggae Nights: The Best of Jimmy Cliff	—	—	—	—	—	
1985	Reggae Greats	—	—	—	—	—	
1987	Fundamental Reggay	—	—	—	—	—	
1988	The Best Of	—	7	—	—	—	FRA: 2× Gold
1994	Gold Collection	—	—	—	—	—	
1995	Reggae Classics: The Very Best of Jimmy Cliff	47	—	57	—	—	
1995	Many Rivers to Cross	—	—	—	—	—	
1995	Definitive Collection	—	—	—	—	—	
1995	Reggae Man	—	—	—	—	—	
1995	Vol. 2	—	—	—	—	—	
1996	Best of Jimmy Cliff^{[J]}	—	—	—	—	—	FRA: Platinum
1997	Super Hits	—	—	—	—	—	
1997	Jimmy Cliff	—	—	—	—	—	
1997	100% Pure Reggae	—	—	—	—	—	
1999	Ultimate Collection	—	—	—	—	8	
1999	Millenium Collection	—	—	—	—	—	
1999	Wonderful World Beautiful People	—	—	—	—	—	
2000	Simply the Best	—	—	—	—	—	
2000	Super Best	—	—	—	—	—	
2000	Wanted	—	—	—	—	—	
2000	The Messenger: The Very Best of Reggae's Original Soul Star	—	—	—	—	—	
2000	Wonderful World	—	—	—	—	—	
2001	Les Indispensables de Jimmy Cliff	—	—	—	—	—	
2002	We All Are One: The Best of Jimmy Cliff	—	—	—	—	—	
2003	Many Rivers to Cross: The Best of Jimmy Cliff	—	—	—	—	—	
2003	Anthology	—	—	—	—	—	
2003	Island Reggae Classics	—	—	—	—	—	
2004	20th Century Masters	—	—	—	—	—	
2004	Reggae Night	—	—	—	—	—	
2004	This Is Crucial Reggae	—	—	—	—	—	
2004	The EMI Years 1973–1975	—	—	—	—	—	
2004	Timeless Hits	—	—	—	—	—	
2005	The Harder They Come: The Definitive Collection	—	—	—	—	—	
2006	The Essential Jimmy Cliff	—	—	—	—	—	
2006	The Very Best of Jimmy Cliff & Peter Tosh^{[J]}	—	—	—	—	—	
2006	The Harder They Come: The Early Years 1962–1972	—	—	—	—	—	
2006	Better Days Are Coming: The A&M Years 1969–1971	—	—	—	—	—	
2008	King of Kings: The Very Best of Jimmy Cliff	—	—	—	—	—	
2008	Reggae Legends	—	—	—	—	—	
2010	Harder Road to Travel: The Collection	—	—	—	—	—	
2013	Jimmy Cliff	—	—	—	—	—	
2013	The KCRW Session	—	—	—	—	4	
2013	Icon	—	—	—	—	15	

Notes

- J. Best of Jimmy Cliff and The Very Best of Jimmy Cliff & Peter Tosh charted in French Compilations Chart, at number 1 and 5 respectively.

=== Singles ===
Year	Title	Peak positions													Album
Year	Title	AUS	AUT	BEL (Vl)	BEL (Wa)	FRA	GER	IRE	ITA	NLD	NZ	SWI	UK	US	Album
1962	"Hurricane Hatty"	—	—	—	—	—	—	—	—	—	—	—	—	—	Harder Road to Travel: The Collection
1962	"Miss Jamaica"	—	—	—	—	—	—	—	—	—	—	—	—	—	Harder Road to Travel: The Collection
1962	"Since Lately"	—	—	—	—	—	—	—	—	—	—	—	—	—	Harder Road to Travel: The Collection
1963	"King of Kings"	—	—	—	—	—	—	—	—	—	—	—	—	—	Harder Road to Travel: The Collection
1963	"My Lucky Day"	—	—	—	—	—	—	—	—	—	—	—	—	—	Harder Road to Travel: The Collection
1963	"The Man"	—	—	—	—	—	—	—	—	—	—	—	—	—	Harder Road to Travel: The Collection
1966	"Pride and Passion"	—	—	—	—	—	—	—	—	—	—	—	—	—	Hard Road to Travel
1967	"Give and Take"	—	—	—	—	—	—	—	—	—	—	—	—	—	Hard Road to Travel
1967	"I Got a Feeling"	—	—	—	—	—	—	—	—	—	—	—	—	—	Hard Road to Travel
1967	"That's the Way Life Goes"	—	—	—	—	—	—	—	—	—	—	—	—	—	Jimmy Cliff
1968	"Vietnam"	—	—	—	—	—	15	—	—	26	—	—	46	—	Jimmy Cliff
1969	"Waterfall"	—	—	—	—	—	—	—	—	—	—	—	—	—	The Harder They Come
1969	"Wonderful World, Beautiful People"	30	—	13	—	—	—	17	—	12	—	—	6	25	Jimmy Cliff
1970	"Come into My Life"	—	—	—	—	—	—	—	21	—	—	—	—	89	Jimmy Cliff
1970	"Sufferin' in the Land"	—	—	—	—	—	—	—	—	26	—	—	—	—	Jimmy Cliff
1970	"Where Did It Go"	—	—	—	—	—	—	—	—	—	—	—	—	—	The Essential Jimmy Cliff
1970	"Wild World"	31	20	7	—	51	—	11	17	3	—	2	8	—	Wild World
1970	"You Can Get It If You Really Want"	—	—	—	—	—	—	—	—	—	—	—	—	—	Jimmy Cliff
1970	"Synthetic World"	—	—	—	—	—	—	—	—	—	—	—	—	—	Goodbye Yesterday
1971	"Goodbye Yesterday"	—	—	30	—	—	—	—	—	25	—	—	—	—	Goodbye Yesterday
1971	"Those Good Good Old Days"	—	—	—	—	—	—	—	—	—	—	—	—	—	Struggling Man
1971	"Sitting in Limbo"	—	—	—	—	—	—	—	—	—	—	—	—	—	Another Cycle
1972	"The Harder They Come"	—	—	—	—	32	—	—	—	—	—	—	—	—	The Harder They Come
1972	"Struggling Man"	—	—	—	—	—	—	—	—	—	—	—	—	—	Struggling Man
1973	"Let's Seize the Time"	—	—	—	—	—	—	—	—	—	—	—	—	—	Struggling Man
1973	"On My Life"	—	—	—	—	—	—	—	—	—	—	—	—	—	Unlimited
1973	"Fundamental Reggay"	—	—	—	—	—	—	—	—	—	—	—	—	—	Unlimited
1973	"Oh Jamaica"	—	—	—	—	—	—	—	—	—	—	—	—	—	Unlimited
1974	"Music Maker"	—	—	—	—	—	—	—	—	—	—	—	—	—	Music Maker
1974	"Look What You Done to My Life, Devil Woman"	—	—	—	—	—	—	—	—	—	—	—	—	—	Music Maker
1974	"Money Won't Save You"	—	—	—	—	—	—	—	—	—	—	—	—	—	Music Maker
1974	"Don't Let It Die"	—	—	—	—	—	—	—	—	—	—	—	—	—	Brave Warrior
1975	"Every Tub"	—	—	—	—	—	—	—	—	—	—	—	—	—	Brave Warrior
1975	"If I Follow My Mind"	—	—	—	—	—	—	—	—	—	—	—	—	—	Follow My Mind
1976	"Look at the Mountains"	—	—	—	—	—	—	—	—	—	—	—	—	—	Follow My Mind
1976	"Dear Mother"	—	—	—	—	—	—	—	—	—	—	—	—	—	Follow My Mind
1977	"Material World"	—	—	—	—	—	—	—	—	—	—	—	—	—	Give the People What They Want
1977	"Deal with Life"	—	—	—	—	—	—	—	—	—	—	—	—	—	single only
1978	"Treat the Youths Right"	—	—	22	—	—	—	—	—	13	—	—	—	—	Special
1978	"Bongo Man"	—	—	—	—	—	—	—	—	—	—	—	—	—	Give Thankx
1978	"Stand Up and Fight Back"	—	—	—	—	—	—	—	—	—	—	—	—	—	Give Thankx
1979	"Love I Need"	—	—	—	—	—	—	—	—	—	—	—	—	—	Give Thankx
1980	"All the Strength We Got"	—	—	—	—	—	—	—	—	—	—	—	—	—	I Am the Living
1980	"Another Summer"	—	—	—	—	—	—	—	—	—	—	—	—	—	I Am the Living
1980	"I Am the Living"	—	—	—	—	—	—	—	—	—	—	—	—	—	I Am the Living
1981	"Son of Man"	—	—	—	—	—	—	—	—	—	—	—	—	—	Give the People What They Want
1981	"Shelter of Your Love"	—	—	—	—	—	—	—	—	—	—	—	—	—	Give the People What They Want
1981	"My Philosophy"	—	—	—	—	—	—	—	—	—	—	—	—	—	Give the People What They Want
1982	"Rub-A-Dub Partner"	—	—	—	—	—	—	—	—	—	—	—	—	—	Special
1982	"Love Is All"	—	—	—	—	—	—	—	—	—	—	—	—	—	Special
1982	"Special"	—	—	—	—	—	—	—	—	—	—	—	—	—	Special
1982	"Roots Radical"	—	—	—	—	—	—	—	—	—	—	—	—	—	Special
1982	"Peace Officer"	—	—	—	—	—	—	—	—	—	—	—	—	—	Special
1982	"Love Heights"	—	—	—	—	—	—	—	—	—	—	—	—	—	Special
1983	"Reggae Night"	55	—	5	—	2	35	—	8	6	1	—	91	—	The Power and the Glory
1983	"We All Are One"	—	—	24	—	15	—	—	—	33	48	—	93	—	The Power and the Glory
1983	"Sunshine in the Music"	—	—	28	—	—	—	—	—	13	—	—	—	—	The Power and the Glory
1984	"Reggae Movement"	—	—	—	—	—	—	—	—	—	—	—	—	—	single only
1984	"Black Bess"	—	—	—	—	—	—	—	—	—	—	—	—	—	single only
1984	"De Youths Dem a Bawl"	—	—	—	—	—	—	—	—	—	—	—	—	—	single only
1985	"Hot Shot"	—	—	—	—	24	—	—	42	—	—	—	—	—	Cliff Hanger
1985	"American Sweet"	—	—	—	—	—	—	—	—	—	—	—	—	—	Cliff Hanger
1985	"Reggae Street"	—	—	—	—	—	—	—	—	—	—	—	—	—	Cliff Hanger
1986	"Seven-Day Weekend" (with Elvis Costello)	—	—	—	—	—	—	—	—	—	—	—	—	—	Club Paradise
1986	"Club Paradise"	—	—	—	—	—	—	—	—	—	—	—	—	—	Club Paradise
1987	"Roots Girl (Step Aside)"	—	—	—	—	—	—	—	—	—	—	—	—	—	single only
1987	"Rebel in Me"	—	—	—	—	—	—	—	—	—	—	—	—	—	Images
1987	"Hanging Fire"	—	—	—	—	—	—	—	—	—	—	—	—	—	Hanging Fire
1987	"Reggae Down Babylon"	—	—	—	—	—	—	—	—	—	—	—	—	—	Hanging Fire
1987	"Soar Like an Eagle"	—	—	—	—	—	—	—	—	—	—	—	—	—	Hanging Fire
1988	"Love Me Love Me"	—	—	—	—	—	—	—	—	—	—	—	—	—	Hanging Fire
1989	"Pressure on Botha" (with Josey Wales)	—	—	—	—	—	—	—	—	—	—	—	—	—	Images
1989	"Trapped"	—	—	—	—	—	—	—	—	—	—	—	—	—	Images
1989	"Dance Reggae Dance"	—	—	—	—	—	—	—	—	—	—	—	—	—	Save Our Planet Earth
1989	"Save Our Planet Earth"	—	—	—	—	—	—	—	—	—	—	—	—	—	Save Our Planet Earth
1992	"Breakout"	—	—	—	—	—	—	—	18	—	—	—	—	—	Breakout
1992	"I'm a Winner"	—	—	—	—	—	—	—	—	—	—	—	—	—	Breakout
1992	"Peace"	—	—	—	—	—	—	—	—	—	—	—	—	—	Breakout
1993	"Samba Reggae"	—	—	—	—	—	—	—	—	—	—	—	—	—	Breakout
1993	"Many Rivers to Cross"	—	—	—	—	37	—	—	—	—	—	—	—	—	Jimmy Cliff
1993	"I Can See Clearly Now"	17	—	32	—	1	52	—	—	39	1	—	23	18	Cool Runnings: Music from the Motion Picture
1994	"(Your Love Keeps Lifting Me) Higher and Higher"	—	—	—	—	—	52	—	—	—	31	—	—	117	Higher & Higher
1995	"Hakuna Matata" (with Lebo M)	—	—	46	6	7	77	—	—	10	—	32	—	105	Rhythm of the Pride Lands
1995	"Melody Tempo Harmony" (with Bernard Lavilliers)	—	—	—	22	6	—	—	—	—	—	—	—	—	single only
1999	"Ob-La-Di, Ob-La-Da"	—	—	—	—	—	—	—	—	—	—	—	—	—	Humanitarian
2002	"Fantastic Plastic People"	—	—	—	—	—	—	—	—	—	—	—	—	—	Fantastic Plastic People
2004	"Jamaica Time" (with David A. Stewart)	—	—	—	—	—	—	—	—	—	—	—	—	—	Black Magic
2011	"Guns of Brixton"	—	—	—	—	—	—	—	—	—	—	—	—	—	Sacred Fire EP
2012	"One More"	—	—	—	—	—	—	—	—	—	—	—	—	—	Rebirth
2013	"C'mon Get Happy"	—	—	—	—	—	—	—	—	—	—	—	—	—	single only

== See also ==
- Caribbean music in the United Kingdom
- List of converts to Islam
- List of former Island Records artists
- List of Jamaicans
- List of reggae musicians
- List of roots reggae artists
- List of singer-songwriters
