= Bernhard Brink =

German singer

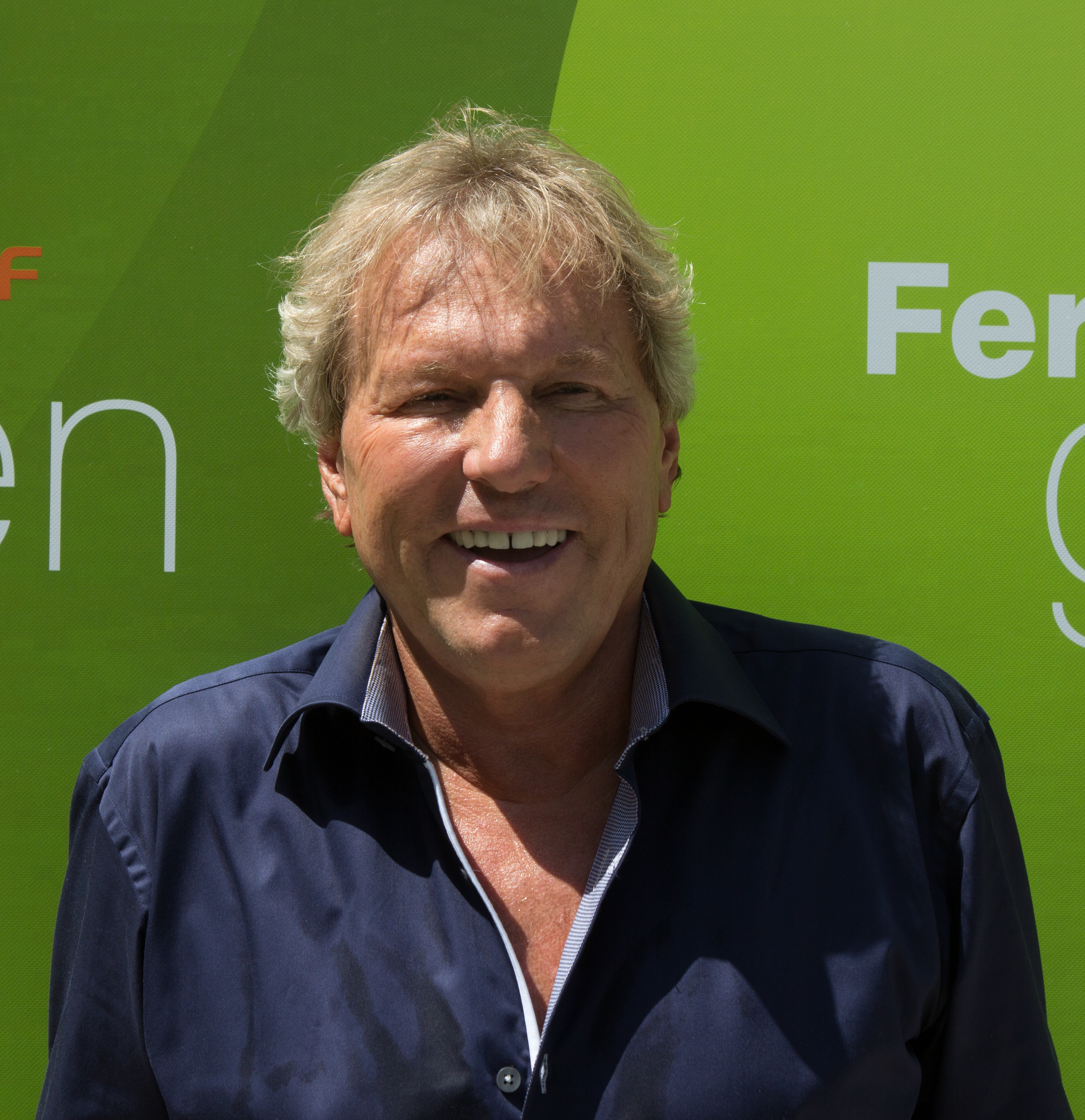
Bernhard Brink, 2018

Bernhard Brink (born 17 May 1952 in Nordhorn) is a German Schlager singer, TV and radio presenter.

== Life ==
After school Brink studied German law in Berlin but never graduated. Brink is a German singer of Schlager songs. Since the 1970s, he has been famous for his songs in Germany.

== Career ==
In 1992, a recording that Brink made with Ireen Sheer, "Du gehst fort" was released on the Electrola label. It was performed on ZDF-Hitparade on 27 August 1992 and 21 January 1993.

Brink recorded the song, "Blondes Wunder" which was a composition by Bernd Meinunger, Charly Ricanek, Mark Reyn and Peter Weitberg. It was produced by Charly Ricanek. Backed with "Wir waren Kinder", it was released on the EMI label. Spending eighteen weeks in the German charts, it peaked at no. 55.

== Awards ==
- 1993: Goldene Stimmgabel
