= Daffi Cramer =

- Also known as: Daffi von Cramer
- Born: Angelika Ramme c 1954; Gladbeck, North Rhine-Westphalia, Germany
- Genres: Schlager, pop
- Occupation: Singer
- Instrument: Voice
- Years active: 1970s - 2000s
- Labels: Ariola, Hansa, Zett-Records

Daffi Cramer is a German recording artist who became popular in the 1970s. She recorded the German national hit, "Charly, laß dir einen Bart steh'n".

== Background ==
Daffi Cramer (real name Angelika Ramme) started her musical career in 1972. Her first record was her version of Little Eva's hit, "The Loco-Motion". Following that she released numerous recordings. Her greatest success was her hit "Charly, lass dir einen Bart steh'n".

== Career ==
=== 1970s to 1990s ===
Working with producer Tony Hendrik, Daffi Cramer recorded "Locomotion". It was backed with "Party-Boy" and released on Ariola 12 412 AT in 1972. The single was credited to Daffi von Cramer.

According to the 24 January issue of Limburgs Dagblad, Daffi Cramer who was pictured in the article "Ook Daffi op feest in Urmond" was to be performing in Urmond that night.

It was reported in the 21 February 1975 issue of Limburgs Dagblad that singer Marjan van Heerlen was suffering from concussion. So Daffi Cramer who was pictured in the article was to replace her, and the next Sunday she would be performing two songs in Urmond, one of which would be "Manuela".

An article about the Hit Parade Festival in Nieuwenhagen appeared in the 29 May issue of Limburgs Dagblad. Daffi Cramer who was pictured in the article was one of the performers to appear the next day's evening. The international festival which was organized by Johan Bisschops and Piet Schulteis also included Rob de Nijs, Imca Marina, Adam und Eve, Astrid Rinkens, Little Arthur and Marina etc.

She recorded the song "Charly, laß dir einen Bart steh'n", a Günther Behrle and John Kongos composition which was backed with "Die Straße der Träume". It was produced by Fritz Muschler and released on single, Ariola 16 780 AT in 1976. It became a hit for her, making it to no. 27 in the German charts and staying there for nine weeks.

In 1977, Cramer released her version of the song "Angelo". Fritz Muschler produced the single which was released on Ariola 11 620 AT.

She recorded the duet "Ich steh' im Halteverbot" with Henry Valentino. Backed with "Was wir aus Liebe tun", the song was released on Hansa 101 162 in 1979.

=== 2000s to present ===
In the 2000s, Henry Valentino re-recorded the song "Im Wagen vor mir" with Cramer, a song that he had originally recorded in 1977 with Uschi who died in 1991.

On 13 January 2019, Daffi Cramer was set to appear at the Smago! awards to appear with "Henry Valentino" to perform the hit "Im Wagen vor mir fahren ein junges Mädchen" (A young girl is driving in front of me).

== Discography ==
=== Singles ===
- Daffi von Cramer - "Locomotion" (Deutsche Original-Aufnahme) / "Party Boy" - Ariola 12 412 AT - 1972
- Daffi von Cramer - "Heute Vor Einem Jahr" / "Sugar Boy" - Ariola 12 722 AT - 1973
- Daffi Cramer - "Fische Wollen Schwimmen" / "Peter Dein Zug Geht Morgen Früh" - Ariola 13 251 AT - 1974
- Daffi Cramer - "Einmal Wird Einer Kommen" / "Nur Mit Dir" - Ariola 16 051 AT - 1975
- Daffi Cramer - "Fang Dir Den Regenbogen Ein" / "Pack Die Koffer Ein" - Ariola 16 473 AT - 1975
- Daffi Cramer - "Charly, Lass Dir Einen Bart Steh'n" / "Die Strasse Der Träume" - Ariola 16 780 AT - 1976
- Daffi Cramer - "Angelo" (Deutsche Originalaufnahme) / " Sorrento" - Ariola 11 620 AT - 1977
- Daffi Cramer - "Ein Mann Mit Brille" / "Ein Schöner Tag Mit Einem Jungen Mann" - Ariola 17 584 AT - 1977
- Daffi Cramer - "Peter Ist Der Größte" / "Pack Die Koffer Ein" - Ariola 17 950 AT - 1977
- Daffi Cramer - " Du Bist Eine Sünde Wert" / "Morgens Um Vier" - Ariola 11 924 AT - 1978
- Henry Valentino & Daffi - "Ich Steh' Im Halteverbot" / "Ich Steh' Im Halteverbot" - Hansa 101 162 - 1979
- Daffi Cramer - "Freude Am Leben" / "Papa Mañana" - Hansa 101 756 - 1980
- Henry Valentino & Daffi - "Die Frau Am Steuer..." / "Du Bist Schuld" - Hansa 102 239 - 1980
- Henry Valentino & Daffi Cramer - "Fremde Zigeuner", "Es Sprach Mich Ein Engel", "Fremde Zigeuner (Instr.)", " Es Sprach Mich Ein Engel (Instr.)" - Zett Records 63.671 (CD single) - 1995

=== Albums ===
- Zu Zweit Macht's Mehr Spaß - Zett Records 76 6034-2 (CD comp.) - 1995

=== Appears on ===
- Mein Hitparaden-Buch 1975-1979, song: Charly, laß dir einen Bart steh'n - 2013
