= Peter Orloff =

German recording artist, composer, actor and songwriter (born 1944)

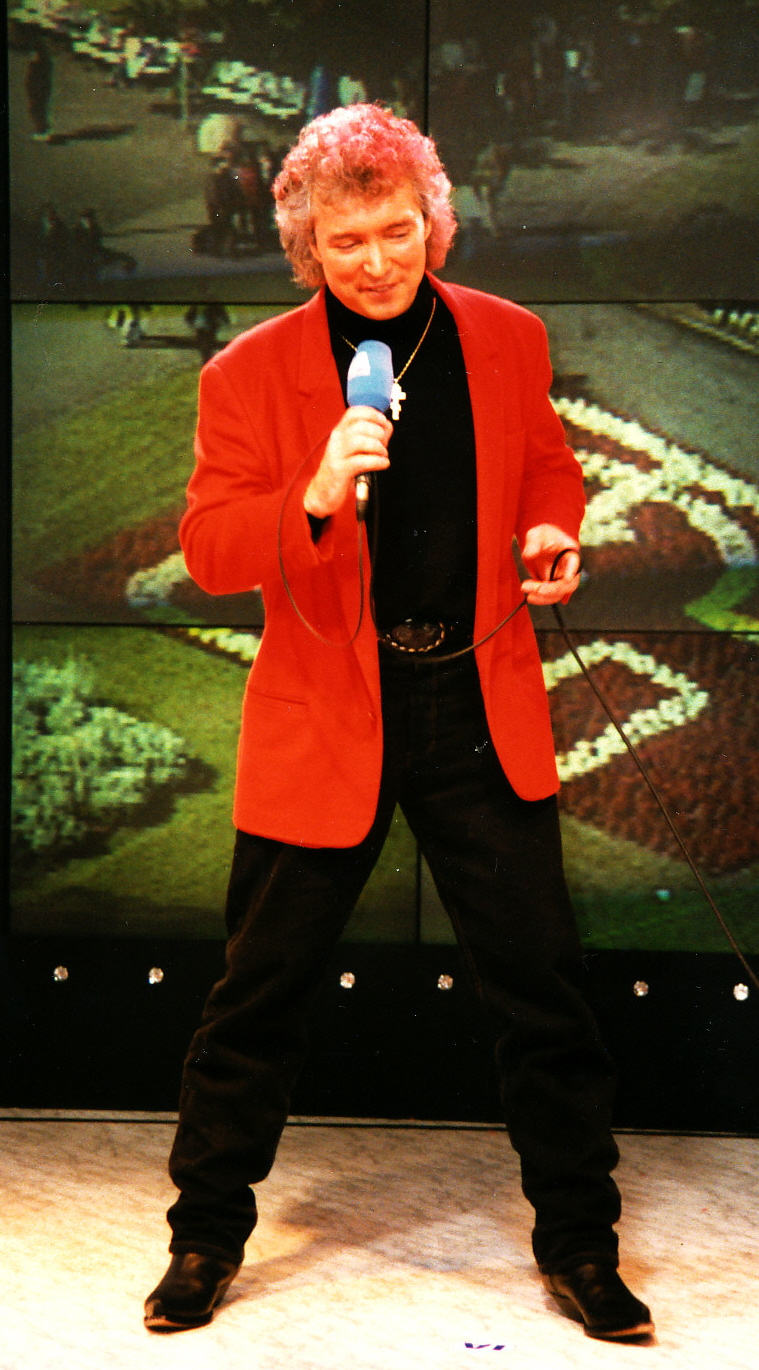
- Orloff in 1992
- Born: 12 March 1944 (age 82); Lemgo, North Rhine-Westphalia, Germany
- Occupations: German comedian and author

Peter Orloff (born 12 March 1944, Lemgo) is a German schlager singer, composer, producer, and songwriter. He had more than a dozen hit singles in West Germany in the 1960s and 1970s.

== Background ==
Orloff was connected with the publishing company Magazine Music. The director was Wilfried Achterfield. Orloff was the composer and producer for the company's subsidiary, Xanadu Music.

== Producer ==
Orloff did a lot of production work with Bernd Clüver throughout the 1970s into the early 1980s. Orloff and Stefan Klinkhammer co-produced the single, "Then He Kissed Me" for the group Ebony. It was released in Germany on Aladin 1C 006-32 779 in 1978.

== Record labels ==
Orloff founded the Aladin and Troja Records labels. He also founded the production company Peter Orloff GmbH & Co. KG.

=== Aladin ===
Mandrake was a German disco, group that was made up of both black and white members. They were an immediate hit for Xanadu Publishing, the division that Orloff produced for. Xanadu was founded in March, 1977. One of Mandrake's members was Sheyla Bonnick aka Sheila Bonnique. Other members Otis Lee, Ricci Hohlt and Don Adams. were Two singles they recorded for the Aladin label were, "It's the Time for Us" bw "Disco Magic" and "Ain't Nobody's Business" bw "C'Est La Vie". Both of them released in 1977.

Ebony was a disco group whose line up included Isetta Preston, Judy Archer, and Jannette Kania. An article in the April 23, 1977 issue of Music Week indicated that the disco group, Ebony was placed well for the European market. Their new single, the Fritz Muschler composition, "Don't Boogie Mr. Tango", published on Aladin was seeing a release in most European countries. It was aired on the Notturno Italiano program. The group had performed the song on the Musikladen show on 11 December 1976.

By early December 1979, Aladin Records had extended its distribution pact and were pushing German Schlager music. With the distribution, artists being released included, Bernd Clüver, Bernhard Brink, Elfi Graf, and Marion Maerz. Peter Orloff also had a release in that time.

In January 2019, he reached number 7 in the German i-Tunes charts with a new recording of Ein Mädchen für immer. In May, his album Teure Heimat (Peter Orloff & der Schwarzmeer Kosaken-Chor) reached number 2 in the official German GfK Top 10 Folk Music charts. On December 6, 2019, Peter Orloff entered the official GfK Top 100 album charts for the first time with this album.

In January 2020, he was honored with two Smago Awards as "The Titan" and "Jungle King of Hearts".

== Singles ==
- Saphir und Rubin / Mein schwarzer Engel 1966
- Das schönste Mädchen der Welt 1967 ("West German Original Recording" of a song by Günter Geißler)
- Es ist nie zu spät 1967, GER #17 ("West German Original Recording" of a song by Klaus Sommer)
- City Girl 1968, GER #20
- Gold auf der Straße 1968, GER #26
- Sie schaut mich immer wieder an 1968, GER #36
- Eine Farm für schöne Mädchen 1969, GER #40
- Monika 1969, GER #37
- Baby Dadamda 1969, GER #26
- Das brennt so heiß wie Feuer 1970, GER #31
- Ein Mädchen für immer 1971, v #16
- Wie ein Stern 1971 ("West German Original Recording" of a song by Frank Schöbel)
- Ein Leben voll Liebe 1971, GER #38
- Jeder hat dich gern, doch nur Einer hat dich lieb 1972, GER #46
- Eliza 1973
- Ein Engel auf Urlaub 1974
- Zünd eine Kerze an und warte auf den Morgen 1975, GER #44
- Suchst du die Liebe - Sunny Girl 1975
- Ich bestell schon mal das Himmelbett 1976
- Wilder Wein 1976
- Bettler und Prinz 1977 (German version of "Needles and Pins" by The Searchers)
- Die Nacht als Christina fortlief 1977, GER #39 (German version of "Lay Back in the Arms of Someone", Smokie)
- Immer wenn ich Josy seh 1978, GER #23 (German version of Kara Kara, New World)
- Cora, komm nach Haus 1979, GER #31 (German version of Tom Tom Turnaround, New World)
- Ich liebe Dich 1979, GER #27
- Königin der Nacht 1979
- War das schon alles? 1999
- Zwischen Kirche und Kneipe 2001
