= Reich & sexy II: Die fetten Jahre =

Greatest hits album by Die Toten Hosen
- Released: 11 November 2002
- Recorded: 1987–2002
- Genre: Punk rock, hard rock, alternative rock, melodic hardcore
- Length: 2:18:03; CD1: 75:45; CD2: 62:37
- Label: JKP (Warner Bros. Records)
- Producer: Jon Caffery & Die Toten Hosen

Die Toten Hosen chronology
Auswärtsspiel (2002)	Reich & sexy II: Die fetten Jahre (2002)	Zurück zum Glück (2004)

Reich & sexy II: Die fetten Jahre ("Rich & sexy II: The fat [successful] years"), subtitled Ihre allergrössten Erfolge ("Their biggest achievements ever") is Die Toten Hosen's second compilation album, named after the first one. It was released as a single- or double-CD, in a digipak. The cover is based on the cover of Reich & sexy.

The first CD compiles the most important singles from 1995–2002 as well as two older songs and four new songs. The second CD is considered a "best of the b-sides and rarities" (1990–2000), and also has a short interview with an early member of Die Toten Hosen who left the band to join Jehovah's Witnesses.

== Track listing ==
=== Die fetten Jahre (lit. "The fat years") ===
1. "Pushed Again" (Breitkopf/Frege) - 3:50 (from Crash-Landing)
2. "Bonnie & Clyde" (Breitkopf/Frege) - 3:33 (from Opium fürs Volk)
3. "Schön sein" ("To be beautiful") (Funny van Dannen, Frege/Frege, van Dannen) - 3:10 (from Unsterblich)
4. "Frauen dieser Welt" ("Women of this world") (van Dannen/van Dannen) - 3:50 (Funny van Dannen cover)
5. "Paradies" ("Paradise") (Frege/Frege) - 3:59 (from Opium fürs Volk)
6. "Nichts bleibt für die Ewigkeit" ("Nothing remains for eternity") (single edit) (von Holst, Frege/Müller, von Holst, Frege) - 3:54 (from Opium fürs Volk)
7. "Was zählt" ("What counts") (Frege/Frege) - 4:38 (from Auswärtsspiel)
8. "Unsterblich" ("Immortal") (Frege, von Holst/Frege) - 3:45 (from Unsterblich)
9. "Irre" ("Lunatic") (Breitkopf, Meurer/Frege) - 3:30
10. "Steh auf, wenn du am Boden bist" ("Stand up, when you're on the floor") (Frege, von Holst/Frege) - 3:52 (from Auswärtsspiel)
11. "Warum werde ich nicht satt?" (roughly "Why don't I get enough?") (Breitkopf, von Holst/Frege) - 3:28 (from Unsterblich)
12. "Madelaine (aus Lüdenscheid)" ("Madelaine (from Lüdenscheid)") (van Dannen, Frege/Frege, van Dannen) - 3:36
13. "Weihnachtsmann vom Dach" ("Santa Claus from the roof") (von Holst/Frege) - 4:02 (from Wir warten auf's Christkind...)
14. "Zur Hölle und zurück" ("To Hell and back") (von Holst, Frege) - 3:27
15. "Nur zu Besuch" ("Only visiting") (Frege, von Holst/Frege) - 4:28 (from Auswärtsspiel)
16. "Niemals einer Meinung" ("Never of the same opinion") (2002 remix) (Frege/Frege) - 3:43 (from Kauf MICH!)
17. "Bayern" ("Bavaria") (Tipp-Kick version) (van Dannen, Frege/van Dannen, Frege) - 4:18 (from Unsterblich)
18. "Auld Lang Syne" (Traditional) - 2:31 (from Wir warten auf's Christkind...)
19. "Zehn kleine Jägermeister" ("Ten little hunters/Jägermeisters") (early fade-out) (Rohde/Hanns Christian Müller, Frege) - 4:22 (from Opium fürs Volk)
20. "Schönen Gruß, auf Wiederseh'n" (roughly "Best regards, good bye") (Rohde/Frege) - 3:33 (from Auf dem Kreuzzug ins Glück)

=== Perlen vor die Säue (lit. "Pearls before the swine") ===
Subtitled Die besten Raritäten & B-Seiten aus 20 Jahren ("The best rarities & b-sides from 20 years")

1. "Entenhausen bleibt stabil" ("Duckburg remains stable") (Breitkopf/Müller) - 3:25 (from "Paradies")
2. "Hang on Sloopy" (Ferrell, Russolt) - 2:30 (from "Bayern"; The McCoys cover)
3. "Vor dem Sturm" ("Before the storm") (Rohde/Frege) - 3:12 (from "All die ganzen Jahre")
4. "Wahre Liebe" ("True love") (Rohde/Frege) - 3:29 (from "...wünsch DIR was")
5. "Abitur" ("Diploma") (Breitkopf/Frege) - 1:56 (from "Alles wird gut")
6. "Die „7“ ist alles" ("The „7“ is everything") (Meurer/Frege) - 4:32 (from "Nichts bleibt für die Ewigkeit")
7. "Tout pour sauver l'amour" ("All to save love" [in French]) (Frege/Casariego) - 4:31 (with Marina Casariego; French version of "Alles aus Liebe"; from "Tout pour sauver l'amour")
8. "Rest der Welt" ("Rest of the world") (Frege/Frege) - 3:53
9. "Police on My Back" (Eddy Grant) - 2:16 (with Ronnie Biggs; from "Carnival in Rio (Punk Was)"; The Equals cover)
10. "Kleiner Junge" ("Little boy") (von Holst/Frege) - 3:58 (from "Bonnie & Clyde")
11. "In Gottes Namen" ("In God's name") (Frege, von Holst) - 3:45
12. "Alkohol" ("Alcohol") (Rohde/Frege) - 2:03 (from "Nichts bleibt für die Ewigkeit")
13. "Long Way from Liverpool" (Breitkopf, John Plain/Frege) - 3:01 (from Put Your Money Where Your Mouth Is/"Sexual")
14. "Ein Witz" ("A joke") (Meurer/Frege) - 2:55 (from "Paradies")
15. "Babylon's Burning" (Jennings, Ruffy, Owen, Fox) - 2:24 (from "Warum werde ich nicht satt?"; The Ruts cover)
16. "Alles ist eins" ("Everything is one") (von Holst/Frege) - 3:20 (from "Pushed Again")
17. "Geh aus dem Weg" ("Get out of the way") (Breitkopf/Frege) - 2:58
18. "100 Tage bis zum Untergang" ("100 days until the demise") (Meurer/Frege) - 4:02 (1987 studio session)
19. "Walter November - Ein Interview" ("An interview") - 1:40
20. "You'll Never Walk Alone" (Richard Rodgers/Oscar Hammerstein) - 2:36 (from "Bayern")

== Singles ==
2002: "Frauen dieser Welt"

== Personnel ==
- Campino - vocals
- Andreas von Holst - guitar
- Michael Breitkopf - guitar
- Andreas Meurer - bass
- Trini Trimpop - drums
- Wolfgang Rohde - drums
- Vom Ritchie - drums

== Charts ==
=== Weekly charts ===
Chart (2002)	Peak position
Austrian Albums (Ö3 Austria)	8
German Albums (Offizielle Top 100)	2
Swiss Albums (Schweizer Hitparade)	9

=== Year-end charts ===
Chart (2002)	Position
German Albums (Offizielle Top 100)	67
Chart (2003)	Position
German Albums (Offizielle Top 100)	67
