= Nur zu Besuch: Unplugged im Wiener Burgtheater =

Live album by Die Toten Hosen
- Released: 18 November 2005
- Recorded: 1 & 2 September 2005
- Venue: Burgtheater (Vienna)
- Genre: Punk rock, acoustic rock, emo
- Length: 69:12
- Label: JKP
- Producer: Jon Caffery & Die Toten Hosen

Die Toten Hosen chronology
| Zurück zum Glück (2004) | Nur zu Besuch: Unplugged im Wiener Burgtheater (2005) | Mehr davon! Die Single-Box (2005) |

Nur zu Besuch: Unplugged im Wiener Burgtheater or Nur zu Besuch: Die Toten Hosen unplugged im Wiener Burgtheater (Only visiting: Unplugged at the Vienna Burgtheater) is a MTV Unplugged album by the German punk band Die Toten Hosen.

== Track listing ==
1. "Blitzkrieg Bop" (Dee Dee Ramone, Tommy Ramone) − 2:23 (from Learning English, Lesson One; Ramones cover)
2. "Opel-Gang" (von Holst, Frege/Breitkopf, Frege, von Holst, Meurer, Trimpop) − 2:35 (from Opel-Gang)
3. "Auswärtsspiel" (Away game) (Frege/Frege) − 3:14 (from Auswärtsspiel)
4. "Popmusik" (Pop music) (Frege, Funny van Dannen/van Dannen, Frege) − 2:30
5. "Nichts bleibt für die Ewigkeit" (Nothing remains for eternity) (von Holst, Frege/Müller, von Holst, Frege) − 3:25 (from Opium fürs Volk)
6. "Hier kommt Alex" (Here comes Alex) (Meurer/Frege) − 4:19 (from Ein kleines bisschen Horrorschau)
7. "The Guns of Brixton" (Paul Simonon/Simonon) − 2:38 (The Clash cover)
8. "Das Mädchen aus Rottweil" (The girl from Rottweil) (Frege, von Holst/Meurer, Frege) − 3:34 (from Auswärtsspiel)
9. "Der letzte Kuss" (The last kiss) (Breitkopf, Meurer/Frege) − 2:44
10. "Wünsch dir was" (Make a wish) (Meurer/Frege) − 3:46 (from Kauf MICH!)
11. "Der Bofrost-Mann" (The Bofrost man) (van Dannen, Frege/Frege, van Dannen) − 2:42
12. "Böser Wolf" (Big Bad Wolf) (von Holst/Frege) − 3:11 (from Opium fürs Volk)
13. "Pushed Again" (Breitkopf/Frege) − 4:08 (from Crash-Landing)
14. "Weltmeister" (World champion) (von Holst, van Dannen/van Dannen, Frege) − 2:58
15. "Alles aus Liebe" (All out of love) (Frege/Frege) − 4:22 (from Kauf MICH!)
16. "Freunde" (Friends) (Frege, von Holst/Frege) − 4:26 (from Zurück zum Glück)
17. "Nur zu Besuch" (Just visiting) (Frege, von Holst/Frege) − 4:37 (from Auswärtsspiel)
18. "Hand in Hand" (Baumann, Götz, Kurtzke, Scholz, Teutoburg-Weiss) − 3:48 (Beatsteaks cover)
19. "Eisgekühlter Bommerlunder" (Ice-cold Bommerlunder) (Molinare, Dt.Spez.; Trimpop/Trimpop) − 4:22 (from "Bommerlunder/Opel Gang")
20. "Schönen Gruß, auf Wiederseh'n" (Best regards, good bye) (Rohde/Frege) − 3:29 (from Auf dem Kreuzzug ins Glück)

== Singles ==
2005: "Hier kommt Alex (unplugged)"
2006: "The Guns of Brixton (unplugged)"

== Personnel ==
- Campino - vocals, kazoo
- Andreas von Holst - guitar, banjo
- Michael Breitkopf - guitar
- Andreas Meurer - bass, double bass
- Vom Ritchie - drums
- Raphael Zweifel - cello
- Esther Kim - piano, accordion

== Charts ==
=== Weekly charts ===
| Chart (2005–06) | Peak position |
|---|---|
| Austrian Albums (Ö3 Austria) | 6 |
| German Albums (Offizielle Top 100) | 5 |
| Swiss Albums (Schweizer Hitparade) | 7 |

=== Year-end charts ===
| Chart (2006) | Position |
|---|---|
| Austrian Albums (Ö3 Austria) | 47 |
| German Albums (Offizielle Top 100) | 26 |
| Swiss Albums (Schweizer Hitparade) | 57 |

== Certifications ==
=== Album ===
| Region | Certification | Certified units/sales |
|---|---|---|
| Austria (IFPI Austria) | Platinum | 30,000^{*} |
| Germany (BVMI) | 2× Platinum | 400,000^{^} |
| Switzerland (IFPI Switzerland) | Gold | 20,000^{^} |
^{*} Sales figures based on certification alone.^{^} Shipments figures based on certification alone.

=== Video ===
| Region | Certification | Certified units/sales |
|---|---|---|
| Austria (IFPI Austria) | Gold | 5,000^{*} |
| Germany (BVMI) | 2× Platinum | 100,000^{^} |
| Switzerland (IFPI Switzerland) | Gold | 3,000^{^} |
^{*} Sales figures based on certification alone.^{^} Shipments figures based on certification alone.
