= Der Krach der Republik =

Krach der Republik

Live album by Die Toten Hosen
- Released: 22 November 2013
- Recorded: 13 July - 12 October 2013
- Length: 117:35
- Label: JKP
- Producer: Vincent Sorg

Die Toten Hosen chronology
Ballast der Republik (2012)	Krach der Republik (2013)	Laune der Natur (2017)

Der Krach der Republik (The Noise of the Republic) is the fifth live album by the German punk band Die Toten Hosen. It was recorded during the tour of the same name and released on 22 November 2013 as a double-CD. A special triple-vinyl edition, limited to 4000 copies, was also released that day.

== Cover ==
The cover and the booklet of the CD were designed by Dirk Rudolph, who had also designed the cover of the album Ballast der Republik and the layout for the tickets of the tour. It shows a combination of the Coat of arms of Germany with the National emblem of East Germany. Inside the booklet is a collage of photos which were taken by Gregor Fischer, Carla Meurer and Paul Ripke.

== Recording ==
The songs on the album were recorded during the following performances on the Krach der Republik Tour:

- 13 July 2013 in Freiburg
- 20 July 2013 in Schweinfurt
- 22 and 23 August 2013 in Dresden
- 28 August 2013 in Rostock
- 6 September 2013 in Bayreuth
- 7 September 2013 in Mannheim
- 21 September 2013 in Rostock
- 11 and 12 October 2013 in Düsseldorf

During the tour, Campino was the lead singer. E-guitars were played by Andreas von Holst and Michael Breitkopf and bass guitar by Andreas Meurer. Drums were played by Stephen George Ritchie. Leading sound technician during the tour was Stefan Holtz. Final mastering and mixing took place at the Principal Studios in Senden, supervised by the producer of the album, Vincent Sorg.

== Track listing ==
Disc one

1. "Drei Kreuze (dass wir hier sind)" (English: "Thank God that we're still here) – 1:35
2. "Ballast der Republik" ("Burden of the Republic") – 2:35
3. "Altes Fieber" ("Same old fever") – 3:50
4. "Auswärtsspiel" ("Away game") – 2:59
5. "Alles wird gut" ("Everything will be alright") – 3:07
6. "Das ist der Moment" ("This is the moment") – 2:42
7. "Alles was war" ("Everything that was") – 2:59
8. "Heute hier, morgen dort" ("Here today, there tomorrow") – 2:34
9. "Bonnie & Clyde" – 3:02
10. "Ein guter Tag zum Fliegen" ("A good day to fly") – 3:26
11. "Halbstark" ("Teenager") – 2:17
12. "Sascha – ein aufrechter Deutscher" ("Sascha – a proud German") – 2:36
13. "Paradies" ("Paradise") – 3:38
14. "Niemals einer Meinung" ("Never have the same opinion") – 3:33
15. "Wort zum Sonntag" ("Sermon") – 4:00
16. "Pushed Again" – 3:52
17. "Schrei nach Liebe" ("Cry for Love") – 3:04 Cover from Die Ärzte
18. "Liebeslied" ("Lovesong") – 4:49
19. "Steh auf, wenn du am Boden bist" ("Get up again") – 3:36

Disc two

1. "Hier kommt Alex" ("Here comes Alex") – 4:42
2. "Wünsch' dir was" ("Wish for something") – 4:24
3. "Tage wie diese" ("Days like these") – 5:05
4. "Achterbahn" ("Rollercoaster") – 2:41
5. "Modestadt Düsseldorf" ("Fashion city Düsseldorf") – 1:47
6. "Alles aus Liebe" ("Everything for Love") – 4:14
7. "Eisgekühlter Bommerlunder" ("Bommerlunder on the rocks") – 3:08
8. "Alles wird vorübergehen" ("Everything will be alright") – 3:01
9. "Far Far Away" – 5:56 Cover from Slade
10. "Zehn kleine Jägermeister" ("Ten little Jägermeister") – 3:17
11. "Schönen Gruß, auf Wiedersehen" ("Greetings, good-bye") – 4:05
12. "Vogelfrei" ("Free like a bird") – 3:06
13. "Draußen vor der Tür" ("In front of the door") – 3:00
14. "Freunde" ("Friends") – 4:10
15. "You'll Never Walk Alone" – 3:23

== Music video ==
On 4 April 2014, a music movie with the title Der Krach der Republik – Das Tourfinale was released on DVD and Blu-ray Disc, which was directed by Paul Dugdale. It was created during the last two concerts of the tour in the Düsseldorf Esprit Arena, now known as the Merkur Spiel-Arena. The video is 125 minutes in length and the order of the songs follows the one on the album with the following bonus tracks added:

1. "Helden und Diebe" (english: "Heroes and Thieves")
2. "Europa" ("Europe")
3. "Verschwende deine Zeit" ("Waste your time")
4. "Opel-Gang"
5. "Hang On Sloopy" (Cover of the McCoys)
6. "Düsseldorf"

== Charts ==
Chart (2013)	Peak position
Austrian Albums (Ö3 Austria)	8
German Albums (Offizielle Top 100)	1
Swiss Albums (Schweizer Hitparade)	7

== Certifications ==
Region	Certification	Certified units/sales
Germany (BVMI)	Platinum	200,000^{^}
Germany (BVMI) DVD	3× Gold	75,000^{^}
^{^} Shipments figures based on certification alone.
