= Im Auftrag des Herrn... – Die Toten Hosen Live =

Im Auftrag des Herrn... - Die Toten Hosen Live

Live album by Die Toten Hosen
- Released: 25 October 1996; 2007 (jubilee edition)
- Recorded: 1996
- Genre: Punk rock
- Length: 75:13; 79:57 (re-release)
- Label: JKP
- Producer: Jon Caffery & Die Toten Hosen

Die Toten Hosen chronology
Opium fürs Volk (1996)	Im Auftrag des Herrn... - Die Toten Hosen Live (1996)	Wir warten auf's Christkind... (1998)

Im Auftrag des Herrn... – Die Toten Hosen Live or just Im Auftrag des Herrn (By order of the Lord or On a mission from God) is the second live album by the German punk band Die Toten Hosen. The album is compiled out of concerts of the 1996 Ewig währt am längsten tour. The title is a reference to the film The Blues Brothers.

== Track listing ==
1. "Die zehn Gebote" (The ten commandments) (Rohde/Frege) − 3:58 (from Opium fürs Volk)
2. "Niemals einer Meinung" (Never of the same opinion) (Frege/Frege) − 3:43 (from Kauf MICH!)
3. "Alles aus Liebe" (All out of love) (Frege/Frege) − 4:06 (from Kauf MICH!)
4. "Einmal in vier Jahren" (Once in four years) (Breitkopf/Frege) − 2:42
5. "Nichts bleibt für die Ewigkeit" (Nothing stays for infinity) (von Holst, Frege/Müller, von Holst, Frege) − 3:34 (from Opium fürs Volk)
6. "Musterbeispiel" (Prime example) (Frege/von Holst) − 2:32 (from Ein kleines bisschen Horrorschau)
7. "Bonnie & Clyde" (Breitkopf/Frege) − 3:17 (from Opium fürs Volk)
8. "Gewissen" (Conscience) (Breitkopf/Frege, Müller) − 2:37 (from Kauf MICH!)
9. "Wünsch DIR was" (roughly Make a wish) (Meurer/Frege) − 4:10 (from Kauf MICH!)
10. "Paradies" (Paradise) (Frege/Frege) − 3:57 (from Opium fürs Volk)
11. "The Passenger" (Osterberg/Gardiner) − 3:58 (Iggy Pop cover)
12. "Hier kommt Alex" ("Here comes Alex") (Meurer/Frege) − 3:56 (from Ein kleines bisschen Horrorschau)
13. "Sheena Is a Punkrocker" (Joey Ramone) − 2:41 (Ramones cover)
14. "Guantanamera" (Girl from Guantánamo [in Spanish]) (Joseíto Fernández) − 3:21 (from Love, Peace & Money)
15. "Zehn kleine Jägermeister" (roughly Ten little hunters/Jägermeisters) (Rohde/Müller, Frege) − 3:32 (from Opium fürs Volk)
16. "Mehr davon" (More of it) (von Holst/Frege) − 6:47 (from Ein kleines bisschen Horrorschau)
17. "Böser Wolf" (roughly Big Bad Wolf) (von Holst/Frege) − 3:15 (from Opium fürs Volk)
18. "All die ganzen Jahre" (All the whole years) (Frege/Frege) − 3:27 (from Auf dem Kreuzzug ins Glück)
19. "Testbild" ("Test card", lit. "Test picture") (Frege/Frege) − 3:16 (from Ein kleines bisschen Horrorschau)
20. "You'll Never Walk Alone" (Rodgers/Hammerstein) − 1:13
21. "Schönen Gruß, auf Wiederseh'n" (roughly Best regards, good bye) (Rohde/Frege) − 5:11 (from Auf dem Kreuzzug ins Glück)

=== 2007 remastered anniversary edition bonus track ===
22. "Seelentherapie" (Soul therapy) (Breitkopf/Frege) – 4:43 (from "Alles aus Liebe (live)")

== Singles ==
1997: "Alles aus Liebe (live)"

== Personnel ==
- Campino - vocals
- Andreas von Holst - guitar
- Michael Breitkopf - guitar
- Andreas Meurer - bass
- Wolfgang Rohde - drums

== Charts ==
Year	Country	Position
1996	Germany	2
1996	Switzerland	2
1996	Austria	3

=== Year-end charts ===
Chart (1996)	Position
German Albums Chart	46
