= Alles ohne Strom =

Die Toten Hosen live album

Live album by Die Toten Hosen
- Released: Oct 25, 2019
- Recorded: July 13 & 14, 2019
- Venue: Tonhalle Düsseldorf
- Studio: Principal Studios
- Genre: Rock, Punk
- Length: 78:35
- Label: JKP
- Producer: Vincent Sorg

Alles ohne Strom is a live album from the German punk-rock band Die Toten Hosen. It features recordings from two unplugged concerts on July 13 and July 14, 2019, which were titled "Mit Pauken und Trompeten" and were given at the Tonhalle Düsseldorf. The album was released on October 25, 2019 by the label JKP. The songs 1000 gute Gründe, Ohne dich und Feiern im Regen had been released as downloads before as a teaser. On November 22, 2019, a video movie with 10 additional titles was released also.

The album contains 21 songs, which according to Campino are arranged in big-band-style. In addition to the five members of Die Toten Hosen, 11 concert musicians had guest performances on the album. From the 21 songs, 14 older songs of the band had been rearranged for acoustic instruments and mostly changed in rhythm and style. 3 cover versions of songs from other artists and 4 new tracks are also on the album. Another previously unreleased song is Politische Lieder, written and composed by Dutch singer/songwriter Funny van Dannen.

== Cover ==
The cover shows the first acoustic guitar of Andreas von Holst, the guitarist of the band, from 1975. Flowers and naked female bodies are drawn on the guitars body. An orange star can be seen and red paint like blood flows down the guitar. Stickers of the bands The Boys and ZK are shown.

== Background ==
In 2013, The Toten Hosen were cooperating with the symphonic orchestra of the Robert Schumann Hochschule Düsseldorf for several concerts. Recordings of these concerts were released in 2015 on the album "Entartete Musik – Willkommen in Deutschland". In addition to that, the on-and-off cooperation with Gerhard Polt and the Biermösl Blosn since 1986 led the band to the idea to rearrange their old songs with new instruments, different rhythms and a big-band-sound. Arrangements for the orchestra and the band were created by Dietmar Mensinger und Hans Steingen, which had already written and composed for the band in the past. As preparation for the two concerts, Campino took singing lessons from professor Ludwig Grabmeier at the Robert Schumann Hochschule Düsseldorf.

The band invited the public to an open rehearsal at July 12, 2019 and played two acoustic concerts on the following days in the Tonhalle Düsseldorf under the motto Mit Pauken und Trompeten. The concerts had been recorded by sound technician Stefan Holtz and were mixed and remastered by Vincent Sorg at the Principal Studios in Senden.

== Personnel ==
During the recording of Alles ohne Strom, the band consisted of:

- Campino, lead singer
- Andreas von Holst and Michael Breitkopf, guitars
- Andreas Meurer, bass
- Vom Ritchie, drums

Guest musicians were:

- Esther Kim, Piano
- Alexander Pichugin, violinist
- Dimitry Pichugin, violinist
- Georg Sarkisian, violinist
- Alex Piastro, violinist
- Simón Doggenweiler Menkhaus, violinist
- Tobias Weidinger, brass musician
- Denis Gäbel, brass musician
- Til Schneider, trombone and sousaphone
- Djorde Davidovic, accordion
- Salome Amend, percussion

== Track listing ==
1. Entschuldigung, es tut uns leid! (engl. "We´re sorry") – 3:32 (first released on Unsterblich in 1999)
2. Strom ("Electricity") – 2:44 (In aller Stille, 2008)
3. Urknall ("Big Bang") – 2:30 (Laune der Natur, 2017)
4. Laune der Natur ("Whim of nature") – 4:12 (Laune der Natur, 2017)
5. Das ist der Moment ("This is the moment") – 3:22 (Ballast der Republik, 2012)
6. Kamikaze ("Kamikaze") – 3:21 (Music: Michael Breitkopf, Campino, Andreas Meurer, Andreas von Holst, Vincent Sorg
  Text: Campino, Marteria)
7. Ein guter Tag zum Fliegen ("A good day to fly") – 4:41 (Ballast der Republik, 2012)
8. Ohne dich ("Without you") – 4:01 (Cover from Rammstein)
9. Schwere(-los) ("Weightless") – 3:22 (Breitkopf, Campino, Meurer, von Holst, Sorg / Campino, Marteria)
10. Altes Fieber – 3:57 ("Same old fever") (Ballast der Republik, 2012)
11. Politische Lieder – 2:05 ("Political songs") (Funny van Dannen)
12. 1000 gute Gründe ("1000 good reasons") – 3:52 (Ein kleines bißchen Horrorschau, 1988)
13. Everlong – 4:10 (Cover from Foo Fighters)
14. Alles mit nach Hause ("Take eyerything with me") – 3:18 (Laune der Natur, 2017)
15. Paradies ("Paradise") – 5:12 (Opium fürs Volk, 1996)
16. Sorgenbrecher (Auf euch) ("Sorrowbreaker") – 2:54 (Breitkopf, Campino, Meurer, von Holst, Sorg / Campino, Marteria)
17. Achterbahn – 4:16 ("Rollercoaster") (B-Seite Hier kommt Alex, 1988)
18. Liebeslied – 3:40 ("Lovesong") (Bis zum bitteren Ende, 1987)
19. Feiern im Regen – ("Celebrating in the rain") 3:45 (Breitkopf, Campino, Meurer, von Holst, Sorg / Campino, Marteria)
20. Hier kommt Alex – ("Here comes Alex") 4:30 (Ein kleines bißchen Horrorschau, 1988)
21. Tage wie diese – 5:11 ("Days like these") (Ballast der Republik, 2012)

== Reception ==
The album topped the charts at no. 1 in Germany, Austria and Switzerland.

In his review on laut.de, Philipp Krause wrote that the album left "a distinctive, strong impression" with him. The album would "tire to the end, but on the way through the tracks" one would find "numerous highlights which prove the creative force of this german punk-band." Krause summarizes that Die Toten Hosen would "polish their old songs to a new shine" and would "integrate new songs cleverly". The new album is "not really thrilling, but nice".

On Musiktipp, a broadcast from WDR 2, it is mentioned that the question "Is this still punkrock?" is moot when it comes to Die Toten Hosen. Alles ohne Strom but is "a great piece of acoustic art", where the band showed their whole musical talent. And this is "in 2019 obviously more than just punkrock.".

== Charts ==
Weekly chart performance for Alles ohne Strom
Chart (2019)	Peak position
Austrian Albums (Ö3 Austria)	1
German Albums (Offizielle Top 100)	1
Swiss Albums (Schweizer Hitparade)	1

Year-end chart performance for Alles ohne Strom
Chart (2019)	Position
German Albums (Offizielle Top 100)	13
Austrian Albums (Offizielle Top 75)	62
