= List of number-one hits of 2012 (Germany) =

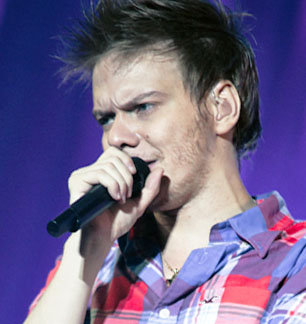
Michel Teló's "Ai Se Eu Te Pego" became the best-performing single of 2012, while Die Toten Hosen's "Ballast der Republik" became the best-performing album of the year.

The Media Control charts are record charts compiled by Media Control on behalf of the German record industry. They include the "Single Top 100" and the "Album Top 100" chart. The chart week runs from Friday to Thursday, and the chart compilations are published on Tuesday for the record industry. The entire top 100 singles and top 100 albums are officially released the following Friday by Media Control. The charts are based on sales of physical singles and albums from retail outlets as well as permanent music downloads.

== Number-one hits by week ==
Key
†	Indicates best-performing single and album of 2012

Issue date	Single	Artist	Ref.	Album	Artist	Ref.
6 January	"Somebody That I Used to Know"	Gotye featuring Kimbra		MTV Unplugged – Live aus dem Hotel Atlantic	Udo Lindenberg	
13 January	"Somebody That I Used to Know"	Gotye featuring Kimbra		21	Adele	
20 January	"Somebody That I Used to Know"	Gotye featuring Kimbra		21	Adele	
27 January	"Somebody That I Used to Know"	Gotye featuring Kimbra		21	Adele	
3 February	"Ai se eu te pego!"†	Michel Teló		Mit K	Kraftklub	
10 February	"Ai se eu te pego!"†	Michel Teló		Born to Die	Lana Del Rey	
17 February	"Ai se eu te pego!"†	Michel Teló		Danke für's Zuhören – Liedersammlung 1998–2012	Xavier Naidoo	
24 February	"Ai se eu te pego!"†	Michel Teló		Danke für's Zuhören – Liedersammlung 1998–2012	Xavier Naidoo	
2 March	"Ai se eu te pego!"†	Michel Teló		Danke für's Zuhören – Liedersammlung 1998–2012	Xavier Naidoo	
9 March	"Ai se eu te pego!"†	Michel Teló		Danke für's Zuhören – Liedersammlung 1998–2012	Xavier Naidoo	
16 March	"Ai se eu te pego!"†	Michel Teló		Wrecking Ball	Bruce Springsteen	
23 March	"Ai se eu te pego!"†	Michel Teló		Bis ans Ende der Welt	Santiano	
30 March	"Ai se eu te pego!"†	Michel Teló		Lichter der Stadt	Unheilig	
6 April	"Heart Skips a Beat"	Olly Murs featuring Rizzle Kicks		Lichter der Stadt	Unheilig	
13 April	"Ai se eu te pego!"†	Michel Teló		Lichter der Stadt	Unheilig	
20 April	"Heart Skips a Beat"	Olly Murs featuring Rizzle Kicks		Lichter der Stadt	Unheilig	
27 April	"Too Close"	Alex Clare		Auch	Die Ärzte	
4 May	"Too Close"	Alex Clare		Auch	Die Ärzte	
11 May	"Don't Think About Me"	Luca Hänni		Auch	Die Ärzte	
18 May	"Too Close"	Alex Clare		Ballast der Republik†	Die Toten Hosen	
25 May	"Tage wie diese"	Die Toten Hosen		Ballast der Republik†	Die Toten Hosen	
1 June	"Tage wie diese"	Die Toten Hosen		Ballast der Republik†	Die Toten Hosen	
8 June	"Euphoria"	Loreen		Ballast der Republik†	Die Toten Hosen	
15 June	"Euphoria"	Loreen		Ballast der Republik†	Die Toten Hosen	
22 June	"Tage wie diese"	Die Toten Hosen		Life in a Beautiful Light	Amy Macdonald	
29 June	"Tage wie diese"	Die Toten Hosen		Ballast der Republik†	Die Toten Hosen	
6 July	"Tage wie diese"	Die Toten Hosen		Living Things	Linkin Park	
13 July	"I Follow Rivers"	Lykke Li		Living Things	Linkin Park	
20 July	"I Follow Rivers"	Lykke Li		Raop	Cro	
27 July	"I Follow Rivers"	Lykke Li		Raop	Cro	
3 August	"I Follow Rivers"	Lykke Li		Raop	Cro	
10 August	"I Follow Rivers"	Lykke Li		Raop	Cro	
17 August	"One Day / Reckoning Song (Wankelmut Rmx)"	Asaf Avidan		Bis ans Ende der Zeit	Amigos	
24 August	"One Day / Reckoning Song (Wankelmut Rmx)"	Asaf Avidan		Raop	Cro	
31 August	"One Day / Reckoning Song (Wankelmut Rmx)"	Asaf Avidan		Projekt Seerosenteich - Live	Philipp Poisel	
7 September	"One Day / Reckoning Song (Wankelmut Rmx)"	Asaf Avidan		Hallo Welt!	Max Herre	
14 September	"One Day / Reckoning Song (Wankelmut Rmx)"	Asaf Avidan		Privateering	Mark Knopfler	
21 September	"One Day / Reckoning Song (Wankelmut Rmx)"	Asaf Avidan		Dead Silence	Billy Talent	
28 September	"Lila Wolken "	Marteria, Yasha & Miss Platnum		The Truth About Love	Pink	
5 October	"One Day / Reckoning Song (Wankelmut Rmx)"	Asaf Avidan		Gespaltene Persönlichkeit	Xavas	
12 October	"Gangnam Style"	PSY		Seeed	Seeed	
19 October	"Skyfall"	Adele		Sonne	Schiller	
26 October	"Gangnam Style"	PSY		AMYF	Bushido	
2 November	"Diamonds"	Rihanna		Lichter der Stadt	Unheilig	
9 November	"Diamonds"	Rihanna		MTV Unplugged II	Die Fantastischen Vier	
16 November	"Diamonds"	Rihanna		Take the Crown	Robbie Williams	
23 November	"Diamonds"	Rihanna		GRRR!	The Rolling Stones	
30 November	"Diamonds"	Rihanna		Celebration Day	Led Zeppelin	
7 December	"Diamonds"	Rihanna		Celebration Day	Led Zeppelin	
14 December	"Diamonds"	Rihanna		Christmas	Michael Bublé	
21 December	"Diamonds"	Rihanna		Christmas	Michael Bublé	
28 December	"Diamonds"	Rihanna		Für einen Tag - Live 2012	Helene Fischer	

== Sources ==
- http://www.germancharts.de/

== See also ==
- List of number-one hits (Germany)
- List of number-one hits of 2011 (Germany)
- List of German airplay number-one songs
