= Schön sein =

Single by Die Toten Hosen

from the album Unsterblich
- Released: October 25, 1999
- Genre: Pop punk
- Length: 3:12
- Label: JKP
- Songwriter(s): Andreas Frege; Funny van Dannen

Die Toten Hosen singles chronology
"Auld Lang Syne" (1999)	"Schön sein" (1999)	"Unsterblich" (2000)

Poodle cover

"Schön sein" (To be beautiful) is a song by Die Toten Hosen. It's the lead single and the seventh track from the album Unsterblich.

The song is about a wish to be beautiful and rich, which in many people's minds is supposed to make their life better off and bring success.

The single was released with two possible covers: a mirror cover and a rarer poodle cover, both of which are symbols of self-admiring.

== Music video ==
The music video was directed by Stefan Telegdy. It features a car mechanic, played by Ben Becker, who cross-dresses in free time and is shown planning a sex change operation.

== Track listing ==
1. "Schön sein" (Frege, van Dannen/Frege, van Dannen) − 3:12
2. "You're Dead" (von Holst/Frege, Smith) – 4:41
3. "Fußball" (Football) (von Holst/Frege) – 2:09
4. "Im Westen nichts Neues" (All quiet on the Western front) (Breitkopf/Frege) – 1:59

== Charts ==
Chart (1999)	Position
Germany (GfK)	9
Switzerland (Schweizer Hitparade)	23
