= Walkampf =

Single by Die Toten Hosen

from the album Zurück zum Glück
- Released: 22 November 2004
- Genre: Pop punk, folk punk, surf punk
- Length: 3:34
- Label: JKP
- Songwriters: Andreas Frege; Funny van Dannen

Die Toten Hosen singles chronology
"Ich bin die Sehnsucht in dir" (2004)	"Walkampf" (2004)	"Alles wird vorübergehen" (2005)

"Walkampf" (Whale struggle) is a song by Die Toten Hosen. It's the second single and the thirteenth track from the album Zurück zum Glück. The title is a pun on the word "Wahlkampf", which means "election campaign" in German.

The song is about a dream by the narrator, where he finds a whale on a beach and struggles to push it back to the water, but doesn't have enough strength for that. All the time, he hears the waves, the sun shouting: "Push the whale back in the sea", which pressures him. He hopes to get help from a Greenpeace ship he sees, but right before his eyes, it sinks. The next day he has sore muscles and gets under the shower but then his girlfriend urges him to "push the whale back in the sea" and on it goes.

The song opens with a slow ukulele tune, progresses into a more aggressive punk style during the 2nd verse, with the bridge between the 2nd and third verse being overlaid with a background singer giving it a more surf rock style similar to a song by the Beach Boys, and the final verse and final chorus is accompanied by bagpipes, with the background singer returning at the very tail end of the song.

== Music video ==
A music video for the song was directed and animated by Andreas Hykade. It entirely illustrates the lyrics.

== Track listing ==
1. "Walkampf" (Frege, van Dannen/van Dannen, Frege) − 3:34
2. "Der letzte Sieg" (The last victory) (Meurer/Frege) - 1:35
3. "Die No.1 von Flingern" (The No.1 of Flingern) (Frege/Frege) - 3:27 (with Beate Frege)

== Charts ==
Year	Country	Position
2004	Germany	24
2004	Austria	10
2004	Switzerland	55
