= Kein Alkohol (ist auch keine Lösung)! =

Single by Die Toten Hosen

from the album Auswärtsspiel
- Released: 18 February 2002
- Genre: Punk rock, Pop punk
- Length: 3:49
- Label: JKP
- Songwriters: Andreas Frege; Andreas Meurer; Funny van Dannen

Die Toten Hosen singles chronology
"Was zählt" (2001)	"Kein Alkohol (ist auch keine Lösung)!" (2002)	"Steh auf, wenn du am Boden bist" (2002)

"Kein Alkohol (ist auch keine Lösung)!" (No alcohol (is no solution either)!) is a song by Die Toten Hosen. It's the second single and the eighteenth track from the album Auswärtsspiel.

The narrator paints a bleak picture of his life, and explains that not drinking doesn't improve matters. Furthermore, he states that even Jesus realized that one can't do without drugs (referring to the miracle of transforming water into wine) and that teetotallers (singling out the Vatican and the Taliban as examples) are the worst people.

== Music video ==
The music video was directed by Peter Thorwarth. It features Karina Krawczyk and Ingo Naujoks in main roles.

The video shows a couple walking into a fancy restaurant. When they're offered wine, the screen splits to two: on one side they decide to drink the wine, on the other side they refuse. Then intermittently separately and with the split screen is shown how the non-drinking version of the couple are having a romantic dinner and the others are starting to act up. On the drinker side it comes to a fight between the man and a waiter and among the mess the two sides become interspersed with each other, which leads to a similar conclusion on both sides.

== Track listing ==
1. "Kein Alkohol (ist auch keine Lösung)!" (Frege, Meurer, van Dannen/Frege, van Dannen) − 3:49
2. "Wie man Kaninchen macht" (How one makes rabbits) (Frege, Meurer/Frege) - 3:57
3. "Im Meer" (In the sea) (Breitkopf, von Holst/Frege) – 3:42

== Charts ==
Year	Country	Position
2002	Germany	32
