= Sascha ... ein aufrechter Deutscher =

"Sascha ...ein aufrechter Deutscher"

Single by Die Toten Hosen

from the album Kauf MICH!
- Released: 1992
- Length: 2:34
- Label: Virgin Records
- Songwriter(s): Andreas Frege; Hanns Christian Müller

Die Toten Hosen singles chronology
"Mehr davon" (1992)	"Sascha ...ein aufrechter Deutscher" (1992)	"...wünsch DIR was" (1993)

"Sascha … ein aufrechter Deutscher" (An upstanding German) is an anti-Nazi song by Die Toten Hosen. It's the first single and the ninth track from the album Kauf MICH!.

The song tells a story about a jobless neonazi, whose hateful activities are sarcastically depicted very "German" and in a neutral light. Also the tune is fun and careless, which contrasts the theme and depiction even more.

== Track listing ==
1. "Sascha … ein aufrechter Deutscher" (Frege, Müller/Frege, Müller) – 2:34
2. "Alle Jahre wieder" (Every year again) – 1:30
3. "Leise rieselt der Schnee" (roughly Quietly falls the snow) – 1:33
4. "Frohes Fest" (roughly Merry celebration) (von Holst/Frege) − 3:41

== Charts ==
Chart (1993)	Position
Austria (Ö3 Austria Top 40)	23
Germany (GfK)	4
Switzerland (Schweizer Hitparade)	14
