= Zurück zum Glück =

Studio album by Die Toten Hosen
- Released: 11 October 2004
- Recorded: 2004
- Genre: Punk rock, alternative rock, melodic hardcore
- Length: 46:43
- Label: JKP
- Producer: Jon Caffery & Die Toten Hosen

Die Toten Hosen chronology
Reich & sexy II: Die fetten Jahre (2002)	Zurück zum Glück (2004)	Nur zu Besuch: Unplugged im Wiener Burgtheater (2005)

Zurück zum Glück (Pun: Back to happiness/Fortunately back) is the tenth studio album by the German punk band Die Toten Hosen. The cover is designed by Dirk Rudolph.

== Track listing ==
1. "Kopf oder Zahl" (Heads or tails; lit. Head or number) (von Holst, Frege/Frege) − 2:46
2. "Wir sind der Weg" (We are the way) (Breitkopf/Frege) − 2:18
3. "Ich bin die Sehnsucht in dir" (I am the longing in you) (von Holst/Frege, Weitholz) − 4:03
4. "Weißes Rauschen" (White noise) (Meurer/Frege) − 2:07
5. "Alles wird vorübergehen" (Everything will go by) (von Holst/Frege) − 3:11
6. "Beten" (Praying) (von Holst/Frege) − 2:47
7. "Wunder" (Wonders) (Breitkopf/Frege, Funny van Dannen) − 2:41
8. "Herz brennt" (Heart burns) (Meurer/Frege) − 3:57
9. "Zurück zum Glück" (Back to happiness) (van Dannen, Frege/Frege, van Dannen) − 2:42
10. "Die Behauptung" (The statement) (von Holst/Frege) − 3:05
11. "How Do You Feel?" (Breitkopf/T. V. Smith) − 3:22
12. "Freunde" (Friends) (Frege, von Holst/Frege) − 4:01
13. "Walkampf" (Whale struggle; a play on the word "Wahlkampf" [Election campaign]) (Frege, van Dannen/van Dannen, Frege) − 3:34
14. "Goldener Westen" (Golden West) (von Holst, Frege/Frege) − 2:50
15. "Am Ende" (In the end) (Meurer/Frege) − 3:19

== Singles ==
- 2004: "Ich bin die Sehnsucht in dir"
- 2004: "Walkampf"
- 2005: "Alles wird vorübergehen"
- 2005: "Freunde"

== Demos ==
One unreleased demo from the album surfaced in 2007 with the re-release of Auswärtsspiel.

- "Das Leben ist schwer, wenn man dumm ist" (Life is hard, when one's dumb) (von Holst/Frege) – 3:39

== Personnel ==
- Campino – vocals
- Andreas von Holst – guitar
- Michael Breitkopf – guitar
- Andreas Meurer – bass
- Vom Ritchie – drums
- Raphael Zweifel – cello on 10
- Hans Steingen's orchestra on 10

== Charts ==
=== Weekly charts ===
Chart (2004)	Peak position
Austrian Albums (Ö3 Austria)	2
German Albums (Offizielle Top 100)	1
Swiss Albums (Schweizer Hitparade)	3

=== Year-end charts ===
Chart (2004)	Position
German Albums (Offizielle Top 100)	44
Swiss Albums (Schweizer Hitparade)	92
Chart (2005)	Position
German Albums (Offizielle Top 100)	82
