= Laune der Natur =

Studio album by Die Toten Hosen
- Released: May 5, 2017
- Genre: Punk, rock
- Length: 49:51
- Label: JKP
- Producer: Vincent Sorg, Tobias Kuhn

Die Toten Hosen chronology
| Entartete Musik – Willkommen in Deutschland (2013) | Laune der Natur (2017) | Das Laune der Natour-Finale (2019) |

Singles from Laune der Natur
- 1. "Unter den Wolken" Released: 7 April 2017; 2. "Wannsee" Released: 7 July 2017; 3. "Alles passiert" Released: 5 November 2017; 4. "Laune der Natur" Released: 4 May 2018

Laune der Natur ("Whim of Nature") is the sixteenth studio album by German band Die Toten Hosen. It was produced by Vincent Sorg and released both as a single and a double album together with the album Learning English Lesson Two on May 5, 2017 on the band's own label JKP. The additional album Learning English Lesson Two contains cover versions in English only and is not available separately.

== Tracklist ==
Laune der Natur contains 15 German-language titles that deal with death, loss (most notably those of Jochen Hülder and Wolfgang Rohde, their former manager and drummer, respectively) and transience of relationships. As with the previous studio album Ballast der Republik, some of the lyrics are a collaboration between Campino, the band's front man, and the hip-hop musician Marteria. The music title Unter den Wolken was added to the album as the first single in April 2017.

1. Urknall ("Big Bang") – 2:28 (Musik: Michael Breitkopf, Andreas Meurer /Text: Campino, Marteria)
2. Alles mit nach Hause ("Everything Home") – 3:18 (Andreas von Holst, Vincent Sorg / Campino)
3. Wannsee – 3:04 (von Holst, Sorg, Meurer / Campino, Marteria)
4. Unter den Wolken ("Below the Clouds") – 3:34 (Andreas von Holst / Campino, Marteria)
5. Pop & Politik ("Pop & Politics") – 2:53 (Tobias Kuhn, Campino / Campino)
6. Laune der Natur ("Whim of Nature") – 3:25 (Campino, Marteria / Jadu Laciny, Marteria, Campino)
7. Energie ("Energy") – 2:47 (Campino, Breitkopf / Marteria, Campino)
8. Alles passiert ("Everything happens") – 4:07 (Meurer, Sorg, Meurer / Campino, Marteria)
9. Die Schöne und das Biest ("The Beauty and the Beast") – 3:30 (Campino / Campino, Marteria)
10. Eine Handvoll Erde ("A handful of soil") – 4:40 (Andreas von Holst, Meurer / Campino)
11. Wie viele Jahre (Hasta la Muerte) ("How many Years (until Death)")– 3:14 (Breitkopf / Campino)
12. ICE nach Düsseldorf ("ICE to Düsseldorf") – 2:10 (Meurer, Kuhn / Campino)
13. Geisterhaus ("Haunted House") – 3:14 (von Holst / Campino, Marteria)
14. Lass los ("Let go") – 3:28 (Breitkopf / Campino)
15. Kein Grund zur Traurigkeit ("No Reason for Sadness") – 3:59 (Wolfgang Rohde and Cäpt’n Suurbier)

== Personnel ==
- Campino – vocals
- Andreas von Holst – electric guitar
- Michael Breitkopf – electric guitar
- Andreas Meurer – bass guitar
- Vom Ritchie – drums

== Certifications ==
| Region | Certification | Certified units/sales |
|---|---|---|
| Austria (IFPI Austria) | Gold | 7,500^{‡} |
| Germany (BVMI) | 2× Platinum | 400,000^{‡} |
| Switzerland (IFPI Switzerland) | Gold | 10,000^{^} |
^{^} Shipments figures based on certification alone.^{‡} Sales+streaming figures based on certification alone.
