= The Polar Bear =

1998 film

- Theatrical release poster
- Directed by: Til Schweiger
- Written by: Granz Henman
- Produced by: Vesna Jovanoska
- Starring: Til Schweiger; Karina Krawczyk
- Cinematography: Greg Littlewood
- Music by: Klaus Badelt; Henning Lohner
- Production companies: Ena Film; Mr. Brown Entertainment
- Distributed by: Constantin Film
- Release date: 12 November 1998
- Running time: 1h 30min
- Country: Germany
- Language: German

The Polar Bear (German: Der Eisbär) is a 1998 German action film directed by Til Schweiger.

== Cast ==
- Til Schweiger - Leo
- Karina Krawczyk - Nico
- Benno Fürmann - Fabian
- Florian Lukas - Reza
- Vladimir Weigl - Thomas
- Jürgen Tarrach - Manni
- Thierry Van Werveke - Norbert
- Robert Viktor Minich - Boris
- Ralph Herforth - Zivilpolizist
- Ralf Richter - Zivilpolizist
- Leonard Lansink - Barkeeper "Paul's Eck"
- Leander Haußmann - Stephan
- August Schmölzer - Heinz
- Heiner Lauterbach - Gesundheitsinspektor
- Katharina Thalbach - Hilde
- Tom Gerhardt - Manager "American Diner"
- Peter Maffay - Alex
