= Alles wird vorübergehen =

Single by Die Toten Hosen

from the album Zurück zum Glück
- Released: 7 March 2005
- Genre: Emo, alternative rock
- Length: 3:11
- Label: JKP
- Songwriter(s): Andreas Frege; Andreas von Holst

Die Toten Hosen singles chronology
"Walkampf" (2004)	"Alles wird vorübergehen" (2005)	"Freunde" (2005)

"Alles wird vorübergehen" ("Everything will go by") is a song by German band Die Toten Hosen. It is the third single and fifth track from the album Zurück zum Glück.

The song is about how every feeling and everything will fade away with time, good or bad, and that one should really be happy about the present when everything is still fine.

== Music video ==
The music video was directed by Paul Shyvers. It contains live footage.

== Track listing ==
1. "Alles wird vorübergehen" (von Holst/Frege) − 3:11
2. "Alles wird vorübergehen - J.C's Dubbed 2 Death-Mix" - 4:28
3. "Rockaway Beach" (Dee Dee Ramone) - 1:59 (Ramones cover)

== Charts ==
Year	Country	Position
2005	Germany	34
2005	Austria	65
