= Tage wie diese =

2012 single by Die Toten Hosen

Single by Die Toten Hosen

from the album Ballast der Republik
- Released: 23 March 2012
- Length: 4:28
- Label: JPK
- Composer(s): Andreas van Holst
- Lyricist(s): Campino; Birgit Minichmayr
- Producer(s): Vincent Sorg

"Tage wie diese", is a song by the German punk-rock band Die Toten Hosen. It was released on 23 March 2012 as a single, being a teaser for the album Ballast der Republik that was released afterwards on 4 May 2012.

The music was composed by Andreas von Holst, while Campino and Birgit Minichmayr wrote the lyrics. Campino provided vocals while Andreas von Holst and Michael Breitkopf played the guitars. The bass was played by Andreas Meurer and drums by Stephen George Ritchie.

"Tage wie diese" is one of only two singles from The Toten Hosen songs to top the German charts, the other one being "Zehn kleine Jägermeister" from 1996.

== Writing ==
For this song, Andreas von Holst had been inspired by the field holler Black Betty, which he knew in the Ram Jam-Version from 1977. He had already composed a first draft of the song with the title "Kreise drehen" (engl.: Moving in circles) in 2010 and recorded it in his own recording studio in his cellar. But the band was not convinced at first - neither did the tune catch their ears nor could Campino come up with suitable lyrics to it. It took the help of Birgit Minichmayr in the summer of 2011 to get things going again. Under the new title "Tage wie diese" this song was recorded as the first one for the album which should be released to celebrate the 30th anniversary of the band.

== Themes ==
The lyrics describe a collective feeling of happiness when celebrating with a large group of people to music.

The song is structured in the following parts: Intro, first and second verse, first chorus, third verse, second and third chorus which then repeats and fades out. A guitar riff in D Major, played by Andreas von Holst, starts the song. Then Campino starts to sing the first verse. In the second verse, the drums kick in, played by Stephen George Ritchie. E-bass and the second E-guitar, performed by Andreas Meurer and Michael Breitkopf respectively, start playing from the first chorus on.

The first part of the song consists of verse #1 and #2. The lyrics describe the joyful anticipation and the meeting with a friend or an acquaintance at a designated meeting-point. Then they are off to the event venue, which is located in Düsseldorf because according to the lyrics, they move „entlang der Gassen, zu den Rheinterrassen über die Brücken, bis hin zu der Musik.“ (engl: along the alleys to the Rhine terraces, crossing the bridges to where the music plays).

Now follows the first chorus, sung by all members of the band: „An Tagen wie diesen wünscht man sich Unendlichkeit. An Tagen wie diesen haben wir noch ewig Zeit. Wünsch ich mir Unendlichkeit." (engl.: On days like today, you wish for eternity. On days like today, we still have forever. Wishing for eternity.)

In the third verse the lyrics express the wish that the celebrations may never stop and that the singer will protect his friend. The words are: „Komm, ich trag dich durch die Leute. Hab keine Angst, ich gebe auf dich Acht.“ (engl.: Come, I'll carry you through the crowd. Don't be afraid, I'll take care of you.)

Now follows the second and third chorus, with another line of text added: „In dieser Nacht der Nächte, die uns soviel verspricht, erleben wir das Beste, kein Ende ist in Sicht.“ (engl.: In this night of nights, that promises us so much, we experience the best, with no end in sight.) The last part is repeated a few times while the song fades out.

== Releases ==
=== Song ===
Tage wie diese was released as a Maxi-CD on the 23 March 2012. The single contained three additional titles: "Champions League" (Lyrics and Music: Campino and Funny van Dannen), "Du fehlst" (Lyrics: Campino; Music: Andreas Meurer) und "Was macht Berlin?" (Lyrics: Campino; Music: Michael Breitkopf). It was also released on the album Ballast der Republik on 4 May 2012; a live version is featured on the album Der Krach der Republik, that was released on 22 November 2013. An additional version, sung by Campino and accompanied by Andreas von Holst on an acoustic guitar was released on the album Alles ohne Strom in October 2019.

A Spanish version of the song titled "Días Como Estos" was released as a download in August 2012. Lyrics were written by Sebastián Teysera of the band La Vela Puerca from Uruguay. A live version of this song is featured on the DVD Noches como Estas – Live in Buenos Aires.

=== Video ===
The video to the song was directed by Joern Heitmann. It features a group of 20- to 30-year-old men and women who meet to spray graffiti. The flow of the video is disrupted with scenes of the song's recording, live performances of the band and of supporters of the German football club Fortuna Düsseldorf.

=== Cover versions ===
A cover version was released in 2015 by the Swiss band Amok, a right-wing rock band. Since Amok replaced part of the lyrics with right-wing agitations, The Toten Hosen went to court with an injunction.

== Success ==
The song reached #1 in the German charts, becoming the second no. 1 song for the band. It ended a 16-year-long waiting period for them since the release of "Zehn kleine Jägermeister" in 1996. It also became no. 1 on the German airplaycharts, staying there for three weeks. Topping the respective charts at #5 in Austria and #4 in Switzerland, the song had considerable success in other German-speaking countries. Certified sellings gave it triple platinum status in Germany, double platinum status in Switzerland and single platinum status in Austria. It also received the Echo for the "Best song in 2012" in 2013 and the prize for the most successful song of the Deutschen Musikautorenpreis 2013.

The Germany national football team chose this song to be the „best song to listen to when preparing for a match“. The ARD-radio station played the song when they aired live coverages of the German football team during the UEFA Euro 2012. According to a survey by Forsa Tage wie diese was voted as the most popular song among business travelers in 2012. The Rheinische Post nominated Tage wie diese as „Song of the summer“. It conveys a "collective feeling of light-headiness and happiness". You can play it at „a public festival as well as when you celebrate a victory in a football game with thousands of fans“. In a listeners ranking Greatest Hits of All Times aggregated by SWR1 "Tage wie diese" scored 4th place from 2000 music titles

== Charts ==
Chart (2012)	Peak position
Austria (Ö3 Austria Top 40)	5
Germany (GfK)	1
Switzerland (Schweizer Hitparade)	4
