= Ich bin die Sehnsucht in dir =

Single by Die Toten Hosen

from the album Zurück zum Glück
- Released: September 6, 2004
- Genre: Punk rock, post-hardcore
- Length: 4:03
- Label: JKP
- Songwriter(s): Andreas Frege, Andreas von Holst, Weitholz

Die Toten Hosen singles chronology
"Friss oder stirb" (2004)	"Ich bin die Sehnsucht in dir" (2004)	"Walkampf" (2004)

"Ich bin die Sehnsucht in dir" (I am the longing in you) is a song by Die Toten Hosen. It's the lead single and the third track from the album Zurück zum Glück. The lead singer takes on the role of personified desire and describes his destructive, yet symbiotic relationship with an unidentified individual whom he addresses directly, possibly the listener.

== Music video ==
The music video was directed by Philipp Stölzl.

It shows clips of various people and what they are missing (the word is shown on or near them): "to see you again", "warmth", "clarity", "to get to know my father", "a miracle", "a girlfriend", "to move the soul", "honour", "Maria", "to be young one more time", "forgiveness", "to be world champion", "courage", "justice", "a daughter", "to be somewhere else", "to fuck", "freedom", "respect".

== Track listing ==
1. "Ich bin die Sehnsucht in dir" (von Holst/Frege, Weitholz) − 4:03
2. "Es geht auch ohne" (It's okay without) (Meurer/van Dannen, Frege) - 2:07
3. "Niemandslied" (No one's song) (van Dannen, Frege/van Dannen, Frege) - 2:24
4. "Fallen" (Falling) (Breitkopf/Frege) - 3:30

== Charts ==
=== Weekly charts ===
Chart (2004)	Peak position
Austria (Ö3 Austria Top 40)	22
Germany (GfK)	5
Switzerland (Schweizer Hitparade)	10

=== Year-end charts ===
Chart (2004)	Position
Germany (Official German Charts)	100
