= Karina Krawczyk =

German actress (born 1971)

- Born: 5 August 1971 (age 55); Gdańsk, Poland
- Occupations: Actress, fashion model
- Years active: 1994–present

Karina Krawczyk (born 5 August 1971) is a German actress and occasionally works as a fashion model.

== Acting career ==
Karina Krawczyk speaks Polish, German, English, and French fluently. She studied acting at the theater school Jacques Lecoq in Paris, France and with Ariane Mnouchkine at the „Théâtre du soleil“ [Translated: Theater of the Sun]. Between 1994 and 1997 she was a member of the „Theater Kreatur“ in Berlin, Germany.

Besides her work as actress, Krawczyk occasionally works as a fashion model. In 2001, she appeared in a series of television commercials for the German automobile manufacturer Audi. Krawczyk also played roles in the music videos Mach die Augen zu [Translated: Close Your Eyes] by the German band Die Ärzte and Kein Alkohol (ist auch keine Lösung)! [Translated: No Alcohol (Is Not A Solution Either)!] by the German band Die Toten Hosen.

Since 1997 she played several roles in movie and television productions. In Katharina Thalbach's production of Oscar Wilde's comedy The Importance of Being Earnest at the Theater am Kurfürstendamm in Berlin, Germany Krawczyk played the role of Cecily Cardew in winter 2006. Since 2009 she plays a role in Katharina Thalbach's production of William Shakespeare's play As You Like It at the Theater am Kurfürstendamm.

== Personal life ==
Karina Krawczyk was in a relationship with Andreas Frege (Campino), lead singer of the German band Die Toten Hosen. The couple separated in 2006. Krawczyk and Frege have a son who was born in March 2004.

== Filmography ==
- 1997: Francis
- 1997: Hundsgemein
- 1998: Babyraub – Kinder fremder Mächte
- 1998: Trouville Beach
- 1998: The Polar Bear
- 1999: Bang Boom Bang
- 2000: Mind Hunter
- 2000: Der Sommer mit Boiler
- 2001: Heinrich der Säger
- 2001: Polizeiruf 110: Die Frau des Fleischers
- 2002: Der Morgen nach dem Tod
- 2003: Das Herz ist rot
- 2004: Einmal Bulle, immer Bulle – Die Stimme des Mörders
- 2007: Nachmittag (Afternoon)
- 2007: Paulas Geheimnis
- 2007: Verrückt nach Clara
- 2009: Flemming: Das Blut der Liebe
- 2011: Remembrance
- 2012: Mord mit Aussicht
