= Andreas Hykade =

German cartoonist

- Occupations: Filmmaker; Animator; Animation director; Cartoonist; Voice actor
- Years active: 1988-present
- Employers: Filmakademie Baden-Württemberg (1991-present); Studio Film Bilder (1991-present)

Andreas Hykade is a German filmmaker, animator, cartoonist, and voice actor. Before studying at the Academy of Fine Arts in Stuttgart from 1988 to 1990, he attended König-Karlmann-Gymnasium Altötting. He worked as an animator in London in 1991, then studied animation at the Filmakademie Baden-Württemberg until 1995. Since then, he has worked as an animation director, partly at Studio Film Bilder in Stuttgart, and as the professor for animation at the Filmakademie Baden-Württemberg.

Hykade's style is minimalist and surreal and is based on simple characters that move in smooth animation. Sometimes, like in the two music videos for Gigi D'Agostino, there is just a white outline over a flat color, much like the Italian animated series La Linea by Osvaldo Cavandoli. Often, his characters have single strokes as arms and legs. Influences to Hykade's style include German cartoonist OL, American cartoonists Kaz and Jim Woodring, American artists Keith Haring and Ed Roth, and Diary of a Wimpy Kid creator Jeff Kinney.

We Lived in Grass (1995) is a student film and Hykade's first part of The Country Trilogy. The set of the film is two streets away from the end of the world. The film is told from the point of view of a little boy. As his father gets testicular cancer, the child travels into Grass to kill a tiger. We Lived in Grass won awards, including the German short film prize.

Ring of Fire (2000) is the second part of The Country Trilogy. It is set in a bazaar of sexual desires. The film is describing an archaic Machomyth and the desire of two cowboys to break with this myth. Ring of Fire won awards, including the Grand Prize at the Ottawa International Animation Festival.

The Runt (2005) is the third and final part of The Country Trilogy. The dead father of We Lived in Grass returns.

In 2007, Hykade illustrated Canadian writer Chris Robinson’s book The Animation Pimp.

Since 2008, Hykade has taught animation at Harvard University. In 2019, he was invited to join the Academy of Motion Picture Arts and Sciences.

According to Animation Made in Germany (2014), Hykade, with Gil Alkabetz and Studio Film Bilder, has undertaken commissioned work, including commercials. Hykade has also collaborated on commissioned projects, such as advertising work for Nickelodeon UK.

== Filmography ==
- The King is Dead (1990)
- We Lived in Grass (1995)
- Don't Explode (1995)
- "Help Me Dr. Dick" (1996, key animator in the music video for German eurodance project E-Rotic)
- "Zehn kleine Jägermeister" (1996, music video for German band Die Toten Hosen)
- The Pills' Birthday (1996)
- "The Riddle" (1999, music video for Italian DJ Gigi D'Agostino)
- "Bla Bla Bla" (1999, music video for Italian DJ Gigi D'Agostino)
- Netman (1999, animated trade show miniseries for German company Bosch)
- Karl Anton (1999, key animator in the animated miniseries by Thomas Meyer-Hermann and Udo Schöbel)
- Ring of Fire (2000)
- "Just a Gigolo/I Ain't Got Nobody" (2001, music video for German singer Lou Bega)
- DIPI (2001, animated image film for German company Deutsche Post Immobilien)
- Hero vs. Time (2002, animated TV miniseries)
- "Walkampf" (2004, music video for German band Die Toten Hosen)
- Tom and the Slice of Bread with Strawberry Jam and Honey (2005-2012, children's animated TV series)
- The Runt (2005)
- The Bunjies (2007, character designer for pilot episode for children's computer-animated series in co-production with Ged Haney)
- Love & Theft (2010)
- Nuggets (2014)
- Myself (2015)
- Altötting (2020, German-Canadian-Portuguese co-production with the National Film Board of Canada and Ciclope Filmes)
- Dealing with War (2022)
