= Crash-Landing (Die Toten Hosen album) =

Studio album by Die Toten Hosen
- Released: 1999; 2007 (jubilee edition)
- Genre: Punk rock, melodic hardcore, hardcore punk
- Length: 52:14; 78:04 (re-release)
- Label: JKP
- Producer: Jon Caffery & Die Toten Hosen

Die Toten Hosen chronology
Soul Therapy (1998)	Crash-Landing (1999)	Unsterblich (1999)

Alternative cover

Crash-Landing or Crash Landing (subtitled Perfect Tunes for the Final Ride or ...perfekt tunes for the final ride [it is unknown whether "perfekt" is a misprint or intentional]) is the second English language studio album by the German punk band Die Toten Hosen, intended for the Australian market. As on Love, Peace & Money, most of the songs are translated DTH German language songs. Some songs were originally b-sides to various singles.

== Track listing ==
1. "The Producer" (Rohde/Frege) − 0:44 (lounge intro of "Umtausch ausgeschlossen!")
2. "The Product" (Rohde/Frege, T. V. Smith) − 1:23 (singing part of "Umtausch ausgeschlossen!")
3. "The Fly" (Frege/Frege, Smith) − 2:01 ("Die Fliege")
4. "Man" (v. Holst/Frege, Smith) − 4:08 ("Mensch")
5. "Pushed Again" (Breitkopf/Frege) − 3:49
6. "Big Bad Wolf" (v. Holst/Frege, Smith) - 3:53 ("Böser Wolf")
7. "Bonnie & Clyde" (Breitkopf/Frege, Smith) - 3:33 (English version)
8. "Hopeless Happy Song" (Bretikopf, Frege/Frege, Smith) - 2:55
9. "I Am the Walrus" (Lennon–McCartney) − 3:06 (from "Paradies"; The Beatles cover)
10. "I Fought the Law" (misprinted on the back "I Faught the Law") (Sonny Curtis) − 2:35 (from "Kauf MICH!"; The Crickets cover)
11. "No Escape" (v. Holst/Frege, Smith) - 3:33
12. "Soul Therapy" (Breitkopf/Frege, Smith) - 5:13 ("Seelentherapie")
13. "Viva la Revolution" (Breitkopf/Frege, Smith) − 4:31 (English version)
14. "Disneyland (Stays the Same)" (Breitkopf/Frege, Hanns Christian Müller, Smith) − 3:27 ("Entenhausen bleibt stabil")
15. "Revenge" (Meurer/Frege, Smith) − 3:59 (from "Pushed Again")
16. "Beautiful Day" (Meurer/Frege, Smith) − 3:24 ("Der letzte Tag")

=== 2007 remastered anniversary edition bonus tracks ===
17. "Runaway Train Driver" (Smith/Smith) – 3:11 (from "Nur zu Besuch"; T.V. Smith cover)
18. "Radio Argentina #1" – 0:23
19. "Carnival in Rio (Punk Was)" (Frege, von Holst/Ronald Biggs) – 3:56 (live in River Plate Stadium, Buenos Aires, 1996)
20. "Born to Lose" (Johnny Thunders) – 2:41 (live in River Plate Stadium, Buenos Aires, 1996; The Heartbreakers cover)
21. "Radio Argentina #2" – 0:30
22. "Hier kommt Alex" (Meurer/Frege) – 2:09 (live in River Plate Stadium, Buenos Aires, 1996)
23. "Radio Argentina #3" – 0:35
24. "Love Me Tender" (Vera Matson, Elvis Presley/George R. Poulton, Ken Darby) – 1:29 (live in CBGB's, New York, 1992; Elvis Presley cover)
25. "Blitzkrieg Bop" (Dee Dee Ramone, Tommy Ramone) – 1:40 (live in CBGB's, New York, 1992; Ramones cover)
26. "First Time" (Honest John Plain/Plain) – 2:42 (live in CBGB's, New York, 1992; The Boys cover)
27. "The Return of Alex" (Meurer/Frege, Dangerfield) – 3:45 (live in CBGB's, New York, 1992; "Hier kommt Alex")
28. "Perfect Criminal" (von Holst/Frege, Dangerfield) – 2:31 (live in CBGB's, New York, 1992; "Musterbeispiel")

== Singles ==
1998: "Pushed Again"

== Personnel ==
- Campino - vocals
- Andreas von Holst - guitar
- Michael Breitkopf - guitar
- Andreas Meurer - bass
- Wolfgang Rohde - drums
- Vom Ritchie - drums
