= Nuggets (film) =

- Video thumbnail
- Directed by: Andreas Hykade
- Screenplay by: Andreas Hykade
- Edited by: Ralf Bohde
- Music by: Heiko Maile
- Production company: Film Bilder
- Distributed by: Film Bilder
- Release date: October 13, 2014 (YouTube)
- Running time: 5 minutes
- Country: Germany

Nuggets is a 2014 animated short film created by German animation director Andreas Hykade. It was uploaded on 13 October 2014 onto the Filmbilder & Friends YouTube channel. The film was covered by media outlets internationally and achieved virality on YouTube, receiving over 3 million views in a little over a month following its release. As of July 2026, Nuggets has received over 35 million views.

== Production and release ==
Nuggets was created by Andreas Hykade and funded by the Federal Film Board. (Note: The official description of the Nuggets YouTube video refers to the Federal Film Board as "FFA Berlin".) Nuggets features a stylised and minimalist animation style. A kiwi, the short's only character, is drawn with black strokes and lines, and is staged on a pure white background, with splashes of goldish yellow being featured in the form of the titular nuggets.

German studio Film Bilder released Nuggets onto their Filmbilder & Friends YouTube channel on 13 October 2014. Nuggets is just over 5 minutes in duration. Nuggets credits Hykade with the script, direction, and animation. Angela Steffen worked on the animation and artwork. Heiko Maile worked on the music and sound design. Additionally, Ralf Bohde, Bianca Just, and Thomas Meyer-Hermann received post-production, production management, and production credits, respectively.

== Plot and themes ==
Nuggets follows a kiwi who encounters nuggets as it walks down a path. As it indulges in a nugget, the kiwi experiences a blissful high, causing the kiwi to feel as if it is flying in the air. The kiwi progressively experiences diminishing returns with each nugget it consumes, with subsequent flights becoming shorter and the falls back down to the ground becoming harsher, until it stops flying entirely. As the kiwi struggles with this, the white background also becomes darker and darker, and the kiwi begins to gain weight. At the end, the kiwi — who is now grossly overweight, hunched over, and barely able to walk — is seen looking at one last nugget, contemplating whether to consume it.

The short portrays the nugget as a metaphor for some sort of drug, with the story itself functioning as an allegory for the stages of addiction. While there are no explicit references to drugs, some media publications have suggested the short specifically addresses drug addiction, with HuffPost Korea writing that most YouTube viewers also interpreted this meaning.

== Reception ==
Nuggets was covered by media outlets internationally. HuffPost Canada wrote that the kiwi's struggle with addiction was "extraordinarily gripping", opining that "there's something so devastatingly human between the stark black and white lines of German animator Andreas Hykade's five-minute creation." RTBF, a Belgian public broadcasting organisation wrote that the mise-en-scène in Nuggets was "refined". Writing for Fast Company, Joe Berkowitz called Nuggets "a fully realized allegory for addiction", and opined that it "succinctly captures the heartbreaking reality of addiction."

Nuggets achieved virality on YouTube, receiving over 3 million views in a little over a month following its release. By April 2015, it reached over 7 million views. As of May 2026, Nuggets has received over 35 million views. Outside of YouTube, Nuggets was also widely shared on Reddit.

== Potential sequel ==
In an April 2015 interview with the German-based newspaper Stuttgarter Nachrichten, Hykade stated that half of a second part to Nuggets was funded. No further developments have been made, however.

== Awards ==
- First Prize, 5–10 minute category – Krok International Animated Film Festival; Moscow and St. Petersburg, Russia, 2015.
- Official Selection – Annecy; Paris, France, 2015
- Special Mention – Countryside Animafest Cyprus, 2015.
- Special Mention – Animafest Zagreb; Croatia, 2015.
- Special Mention – Monstra Animation Festival; Lisbon, Portugal, 2015.
- "Short Tiger" Award – Filmförderungsanstalt; Berlin, Germany, 2015.
- Winner – UnLonely Film Festival; Brookline, Massachusetts, 2018.
