= Unsterblich =

Studio album by Die Toten Hosen
- Released: 6 December 1999; 2007 (jubilee edition)
- Recorded: August – November 1999
- Genre: Alternative rock, punk rock, hard rock
- Length: 54:21; 79:23 (re-release)
- Label: JKP
- Producer: Jon Caffery & Die Toten Hosen

Die Toten Hosen chronology
Crash-Landing (1999)	Unsterblich (1999)	Mehr davon! Die Single-Box 1995-2000 (2001)

Alternate cover

Unsterblich (Immortal) is the eighth studio album by the German punk band Die Toten Hosen. The band has stated dissatisfaction with the cover, which is a photo by Johann Zambryski. This album is considered overall one of the more peaceful and quiet DTH albums, although there are some loud songs on the album.

== Track listing ==
1. "Entschuldigung, es tut uns leid!" (Forgive us, we're sorry!) (Frege/Jacques Palminger, Frege, Joe Tirol) − 4:05
2. "Lesbische, schwarze Behinderte" (Lesbian, black, disabled people) (van Dannen/van Dannen) − 2:28 (Funny van Dannen cover)
3. "Warum werde ich nicht satt?" (roughly Why don't I get enough?) (Breitkopf, von Holst/Frege) − 3:28
4. "Wofür man lebt" (Why one lives) (von Holst, Meurer/Frege) − 3:18
5. "Helden und Diebe" (Heroes and thieves) (Breitkopf/Frege) − 6:05
6. "Sonntag im Zoo" (Sunday at the zoo) (Frank Ziegert) − 2:37 (Frank Z. cover)
7. "Schön sein" (To be beautiful) (Frege, van Dannen/Frege, van Dannen) − 3:12
8. "Container-Lied" (Container song) (Meurer/Frege) − 1:07
9. "Alles wie immer" (Everything as ever) (Meurer/Frege) − 2:49
10. "Unsterblich" (Immortal) (Frege, von Holst/Frege) − 3:46
11. "Inter-Sex" (Meurer) − 0:40
12. "Call of the Wild" (Breitkopf/Frege, T. V. Smith) − 3:23
13. "Unser Haus" (Our house) (von Holst/Frege) − 3:22
14. "Regen" (Rain) (Rohde/Frege) − 2:09
15. "König der Blinden" (King of the blind) (Breitkopf, von Holst/Frege) − 3:32
16. "Bayern" (lit. Bavaria, used as a reference for the German football club FC Bayern Munich) (van Dannen, Frege/van Dannen, Frege) − 4:16
17. "Der Mond, der Kühlschrank und ich" (The moon, the refrigerator and me) (van Dannen, Frege/van Dannen, Frege) − 2:43
18. "Die Unendlichkeit" (The infinity) (von Holst/Frege) − 1:28

=== 2007 remastered anniversary edition bonus tracks ===
19. "Ich seh' die Schiffe den Fluß herunterfahren" (I see the ships floating downstream) (Ziegert, Strauss/Hansen) – 2:41 (from the compilation Pop 2000; Abwärts cover)
20. "Fußball" (Football) (von Holst/Frege) – 2:09 (from "Schön sein")
21. "Im Westen nichts Neues" (All quiet on the Western front) (Breitkopf/Frege) – 1:59 (from "Schön sein")
22. "Gesicht 2000" (Face 2000) (Breitkopf/Frege) – 2:20 (Unsterblich demo)
23. "Lass doch mal Dampf ab" (Let some steam off for once) (Christian Bruhn/Fred Weyrich) – 2:24 (from "Bayern"; Gert Fröbe cover)
24. "Meine Stadt" (My city) (Breitkopf/Frege) – 2:47 (from the compilation Pro Asyl - On the Run)
25. "Neandertaler" (Neanderthal) (van Dannen, Frege/van Dannen, Frege) – 3:22 (Unsterblich demo)
26. "In der Nacht der lebenden Leichen" (In the night of the living corpses) (Meurer/Frege) – 2:33 (from the compilation Fritz 10 Jahre)
27. "You're Dead" (von Holst/Frege, Smith) – 4:41 (from "Schön sein"/You Are Dead OST)

== Singles ==
1999: "Schön sein"
2000: "Unsterblich"
2000: "Bayern"
2000: "Warum werde ich nicht satt?"

== Demos ==
Two unreleased demos from the album surfaced in 2007 with the re-release of main DTH albums.

- "Zigarettenautomat" (Cigarette machine) (Frege, Hanns Christian Müller/Müller, Frege) – 2:04 (released on Ein kleines bisschen Horrorschau)
- "Steht auf, zum Gebet!" (Stand up, for prayer[s]) (Frege/Frege) – 1:58 (released on Auf dem Kreuzzug ins Glück)

== Personnel ==
- Campino - vocals
- Andreas von Holst - guitar
- Michael Breitkopf - guitar
- Andreas Meurer - bass
- Wolfgang Rohde - drums (4, 11, 14, 16)
- Vom Ritchie - drums
- Big Noise Orchestra (Hans Steingen) - brass instruments
- Birte Schuler - cello

== Charts ==
=== Weekly charts ===
1999 weekly chart performance for Unsterblich
Chart (1999)	Peak position
Austrian Albums (Ö3 Austria)	6
German Albums (Offizielle Top 100)	1
Swiss Albums (Schweizer Hitparade)	9

2024 weekly chart performance for Unsterblich
Chart (2024)	Peak position
German Albums (Offizielle Top 100)	1

=== Year-end charts ===
Year-end chart performance for Unsterblich
Chart (2000)	Peak position
German Albums (Offizielle Top 100)	18
Swiss Albums (Schweizer Hitparade)	54
