= Win-initiative =

Independent Photography company

WIN-Initiative is an independent stock photography company that licenses images based on global youth culture. Founded in 2007 by photographer Hans Neleman, WIN, which stands for Worldwide Image Navigation, licenses images from its community of photographers from around the world. Essentially functioning as a collective, WIN Scouts are located in 22 countries. These Scouts assist in finding and retaining new talent, as well as being the liaison with the WIN headquarters team in SoHo, New York City.

== Overview ==
Photographer and WIN founder Hans Neleman has stated that he began the company when he started acquiring imagery from photographers he would meet during his travels. To ensure a certain level of quality, and to empower young photographers, Neleman would often leave cameras, lighting equipment and other gear with his local Scouts, who would then serve to distribute and recollect the equipment.

WIN, a rights managed company, then licenses these images through its Website and its partnerships with stock photography companies like Getty Images and Corbis. WIN's library offers youth-culture centric images. The company's Website promotes its images as "authentic, provocative and inspiring" and the company has marketed itself as the "alternative stock photography" agency.

The company launched a quarterly, online magazine, WINk in 2009, of which there have been four issues: Debut, The Light Issue, Provocative and Collaboration. Additionally, WIN has also launched an international photography competition, 10 BEST 10, as well as an app for the iPhone and iPad, iD Release, that enables digital signatures to be obtained on actor, model, extra and property releases. WIN also hosts a conversational lecture party, Take 5ive, based on the dada movement.

== Articles ==
- About The Image: WIN's 10 Best 10
- Photocrew Article on 10 Best 10, 2009
- Resource Magazine Blog, 2009
