= Tom and the Slice of Bread with Strawberry Jam and Honey =

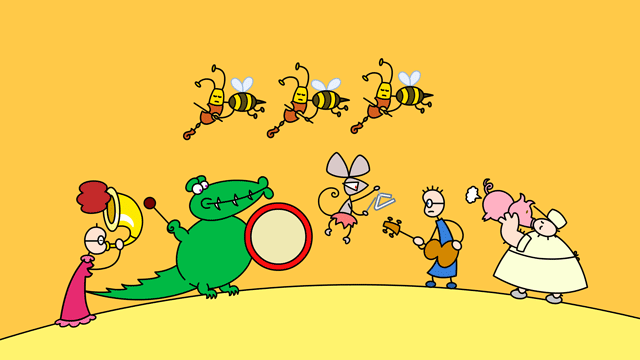
- A screenshot from the episode "Tom's Band".
- Also known as: Tom & the Slice of Bread with Strawberry Jam & Honey
- Genre: Animation; Children's television series
- Created by: Andreas Hykade
- Starring: Dirk Bach; Ben Miller/Jimmy Hibbert (English version)
- Country of origin: Germany
- No. of seasons: 4
- No. of episodes: 52

Production
- Running time: 5 minutes
- Production company: Studio Film Bilder

Original release
- Network: KiKa
- Release: November 11, 2005 – April 19, 2012

Tom and the Slice of Bread with Strawberry Jam and Honey (German title: Tom und das Erdbeermarmeladebrot mit Honig) is a German animated television series created by Andreas Hykade, running from 2005 until 2012.

An English dub of the show was created in 2009, with Ben Miller being the voice actor. In 2016, the dub changed its voice actor to Jimmy Hibbert, and was distributed by British company Cake Entertainment in the UK. The series also aired in the United States in Spanish on TV network V-me.

The first season consisted of 13 episodes. From 2008 onwards, three more seasons were created, each with 13 episodes, resulting in 52 episodes. Every episode, including the English dub, is now on YouTube.

The series won an Honourable Mention in the Television Made for Children category at the 2009 Ottawa International Animation Festival. It received the Grimme Online Award in 2009 and won best animated TV series at the Annecy International Animation Film Festival in 2013.

== Premise ==
The titular protagonist of the show is Tom, who is always on the lookout for a slice of bread with strawberry jam and honey, almost ends up with exactly half a loaf that "tastes as good as if it were a whole" and spends the rest of the day, thinking about nothing at all. On his searches, Tom regularly meets various friends.

== Characters ==
- Tom - the titular protagonist of the show, wearing a long blue shirt and glasses. His favorite food is, of course, the slice of bread with strawberry jam and honey.
- The miller - Tom's best friend, who usually gives him flour for his bread. He lives in a windmill, and his pet is a magical pig that helps him with his work.
- Tom's mother - from her, Tom gets "delicious well water" for baking bread. She also wears a wig and has a one-eyed purple cat as her pet.
- The poor little girl - a friendly orphaned girl with a green dress who likes to advice Tom.
- The strawberry mouse - an anthropomorphic mouse who's the proud and rather miserly owner of a large strawberry field, wearing a skirt. She can get mean most of the time, and she can see everything with her "eagle eyes".
- The crocodile - an overweight crocodile who's the strawberry mouse's henchman and sometimes friend, as well as an "internationally recognized strawberry squeezer", "internationally recognized abdominal trainer", "internationally recognized crocodile washer", "internationally recognized screwdriver", "internationally recognized strawberry cake baker", "internationally recognized strawberry planter", "internationally recognized cow stomach toucher", etc.
- The three bees - a trio of bees who are mostly in a bad mood, but every now and then, Tom can get some honey from them. To give Tom honey, they use buckets to collect the honey of nectars.
- The nice man - a strange but polite big-nosed overweight humanoid who lives in a drain in the middle of flowers, rhymes a lot and has a huge obsession with slices of bread with strawberry jam and honey. He also has a family known as the nice family, which is composed of a large brother, a kangaroo-like wife with two children on her dress (as opposed to the kangaroo's pouch), an aunt, a laid-back teenage nephew with a paperclip on his nose, a beautiful red-haired niece, a bloat who lives under the stairs, a grandmother, and a grandfather. Their usual attire consists of brown pants or overalls and brown hats (only for the male family members, except the nephew, who has blonde hair), and what the female family members (excluding the niece) usually have is blonde hair (the grandmother's hair color is a mix between blonde and pale).
- Doc Box - an elderly doctor with a gray hat and springs for neck and arms who lives inside a box, a nod to the jack-in-the-box. If a coin's inserted into his box, he'll pop out of it. He helps Tom (and sometimes his friends) to cure what's wrong with them, like Tom's head being empty or hiccups.
- The frogs - the creatures that the miller has a fear of, and unlike what real frogs do, they change everything in random ways if they swallow them (with the exception of Grungo), and also talk with the "frog language". Notable frogs include a green frog (Grungo), a pink frog that makes the whole world topsy-turvy (Limbo), a stripy frog (Stripo), a spotty frog (Spotto), a tiny pink frog that makes everything shrink (Shrinko), and a giant blue frog that makes everything grow (Bongo). There are also young frogs, like Flip, Flap and Flop, Stripo and Spotto's twin children.
- Luisa the cow - a very lazy cow who doesn't want to produce milk until when she eats a slice of bread with strawberry jam and honey. She has a son named Marvin, who has one eye unlike her and often messes things up.
- Buba - a wise tortoise who, in addition to walking slowly, gets fast when his shell turns upside-down.
- The three glowers - the equivalents to the three bees. They live in the woods, and they are mainly depressed. They are composed of a red-haired glower, a glower with an Elvis Presley-style hair and a female blonde glower. They are actually depicted and are also known as fireflies in the original German version.
- The four ants - an ant quartet that, despite being usually tiny, wanted a slice of bread with strawberry jam and honey. They always walk around while humming.
- Mina and Mona - the moaning mini twin sisters and the antagonists. They share the same bodies (bluish-gray skin, bat-like bodies, deadpan expressions, and goth personalities), but they have different hair, with Mina having a pink ponytail and Mona having long purple hair. They dislike Tom so much to the point that they call him silly. They also have telescopes.
- Tom's father - he always sails the Seven Seas with his boat and remembers his son well. He also has a pet parrot once and loves fishing.
- The cucumber emperor - a quiet, god-like cucumber cyclops who is the galactic emperor of his kind.

== See also ==
- List of German television series
