= Auswärtsspiel =

Studio album by Die Toten Hosen
- Released: 21 January 2002; 2007 (jubilee edition)
- Recorded: 2001
- Genre: Punk rock, heavy metal, melodic hardcore
- Length: 57:21; 76:55 (re-release)
- Label: JKP
- Producer: Jon Caffery & Die Toten Hosen

Die Toten Hosen chronology
Mehr davon! Die Single-Box 1995-2000 (2001)	Auswärtsspiel (2002)	Reich & sexy II: Die fetten Jahre (2002)

Auswärtsspiel (Away game) is the ninth studio album by the German punk band Die Toten Hosen. It was released in 2002. This is one of the band's favourite albums. The record is much more personal than previous albums. This is also the last album re-released remastered in digipak, with a new booklet and with bonus tracks along with all the previous major albums in 2007.

== Track listing ==
1. "Du lebst nur einmal (vorher)" (You only live once (before)) (Breitkopf/Frege) − 2:09
2. "Schlampe (nachher)" (Bitch (afterwards)) (Frege/Frege, Rocko Schamoni) − 3:01
3. "Was zählt" (What counts) (Breitkopf, von Holst/Frege) − 4:37
4. "Auswärtsspiel" (Away game) (Frege/Frege) − 2:35
5. "Cokane in My Brain" (Bullocks/Bullocks) − 3:22 (Dillinger cover)
6. "Graue Panther" (Gray panthers) (Meurer/Frege) − 2:52
7. "Tier" (Animal) (Meurer/Frege) − 1:14
8. "Kanzler sein..." (To be the chancellor...) (Breitkopf, Meurer, Funny van Dannen/Frege, van Dannen) − 3:26
9. "Das Mädchen aus Rottweil" (The girl from Rottweil) (Frege, von Holst/Meurer, Frege) − 3:18
10. "Dankbar" (Grateful) (Breitkopf, von Holst/Frege) − 2:53
11. "Nur zu Besuch" (Just visiting) (Frege, von Holst/Frege) − 4:29
12. "Daydreaming" (Breitkopf, T. V. Smith, Frege, von Holst/Frege, Smith) − 3:10
13. "Steh auf, wenn du am Boden bist" (Get up when you're down) (von Holst/Frege) − 3:51
14. "Amanita phalloides" (Breitkopf/Frege) − 2:27
15. "Depression Deluxe" (von Holst/Frege) − 3:09
16. "Schwimmen" (Swimming) (Frege, von Holst/Frege) − 3:33
17. "Venceremos - Wir werden siegen" (We will win [in Spanish and in German]) (Meurer/Frege) − 3:26
18. "Kein Alkohol (ist auch keine Lösung)!" (No alcohol (is no solution either)!) (Frege, Meurer, van Dannen/Frege, van Dannen) − 3:49

=== 2007 remastered anniversary edition bonus tracks ===
19. "Drüber reden" (Talking about it) (von Holst/Frege) – 1:42 (from "Was zählt")
20. "Schöner warten" (Nicer waiting) (Frege/Frege) – 3:58 (from "Was zählt")
21. "Im Meer" (In the sea) (Breitkopf, von Holst/Frege) – 3:42 (from "Kein Alkohol (ist auch keine Lösung)!")
22. "Leben im Bildausschnitt" (Life in a picture detail) (Meurer/Frege) – 3:05 (from "Steh auf, wenn du am Boden bist")
23. "Hirnfick (Futter für die Fische)" (Brainfuck (Food for the fish)) (von Holst/Frege) – 3:17 (from "Nur zu Besuch")
24. "Das Leben ist schwer, wenn man dumm ist" (Life is hard, when one's stupid) (von Holst/Frege) – 3:39 (Zurück zum Glück demo)

== Singles ==
2001: "Was zählt"
2002: "Kein Alkohol (ist auch keine Lösung)!"
2002: "Steh auf, wenn du am Boden bist"
2002: "Nur zu Besuch"

== Personnel ==
- Campino - vocals
- Andreas von Holst - guitar
- Michael Breitkopf - guitar
- Andreas Meurer - bass
- Vom Ritchie - drums
- Tim Cross - keyboards
- Hans Steingen - piano on 11

== Charts ==
=== Weekly charts ===
Chart (2002)	Peak position
Austrian Albums (Ö3 Austria)	1
German Albums (Offizielle Top 100)	1
Swiss Albums (Schweizer Hitparade)	3

=== Year-end charts ===
Chart (2002)	Position
Austrian Albums (Ö3 Austria)	32
German Albums (Offizielle Top 100)	7
