= Was zählt =

Single by Die Toten Hosen

from the album Auswärtsspiel
- Released: November 26, 2001
- Genre: Alternative rock, post hardcore
- Length: 4:37
- Label: JKP
- Songwriter(s): Andreas Frege; Michael Breitkopf; Andreas von Holst

Die Toten Hosen singles chronology
"Warum werde ich nicht satt?" (2000)	"Was zählt" (2001)	"Kein Alkohol (ist auch keine Lösung)!" (2002)

"Was zählt" (What counts) is a song by Die Toten Hosen. It's the first single and the third track from the album Auswärtsspiel.

The song is an ode to love ("Wenn nur die Liebe zählt" - When only love matters), as it describes, how one can go through anything and suffer a lot for love, also give up any memories for it.

== Music video ==
The music video was directed by Ralf Schmerberg. It shows the band performing the song in a room in a city building. Also the streets outside are shown, which are overflowing with police, as the video was shot a while after the September 11 attacks.

== Track listing ==
1. "Was zählt" (What counts) (Breitkopf, von Holst/Frege) − 4:37
2. "Hängt ihn höher" (Hang him higher) (Meurer/Frege) - 2:37
3. "Drüber reden" (Talking about it) (von Holst/Frege) – 1:42
4. "Schöner warten" (Nicer waiting) (Frege/Frege) – 3:58

== Charts ==
Chart (2001–02)	Position
Austria (Ö3 Austria Top 40)	54
Germany (GfK)	16
Switzerland (Schweizer Hitparade)	46
