= Alles aus Liebe =

Song by Die Toten Hosen

Single by Die Toten Hosen

from the album Kauf MICH!
- Released: 16 August 1993
- Length: 4:34
- Label: Virgin Records
- Songwriter: Andreas Frege

Die Toten Hosen singles chronology
"...wünsch DIR was" (1993)	"Alles aus Liebe" (1993)	"Kauf MICH!" (1994)

"Alles aus Liebe" (All from love) is a song by the German punk rock band Die Toten Hosen. It is the third single and the twelfth track from the album Kauf MICH!.

The song is narrated by a man, who doesn't know how to correctly express and emphasise his love towards a woman and decides to commit a suicide to prove his love. However, in the end of the song he decides, that they should go together. In the end of the song, three shots are heard.

There is also an English version of the song, titled "All for the Sake of Love", which appeared on Love, Peace & Money.

== Music video ==
The video was directed by Hans Neleman. In it, Campino sings to a woman beside a window.

== Track listing ==
1. "Alles aus Liebe" (Frege/Frege) – 4:34
2. "Auf dem Weg zur Nr. Eins" (On the way to no. one) (Rohde/Frege) − 4:01
3. "5 Minuten" (5 minutes) (von Holst/Frege) − 3:01

== Charts ==
Chart (1994)	Position
Germany (GfK)	29
Switzerland (Schweizer Hitparade)	37

== Tout pour sauver l'amour ==
"Tout pour sauver l'amour"

Single by Die Toten Hosen featuring Marina Casariego
- Released: 1995
- Genre: Punk rock
- Length: 4:31
- Label: Virgin Records
- Songwriters: Andreas Frege; Marina Casariego

Die Toten Hosen singles chronology
"Sexual" (1994)	"Tout pour sauver l'amour" (1995)	"Nichts bleibt für die Ewigkeit" (1995)

A French version of the song, titled "Tout pour sauver l'amour" (All to save love), was released as a promo single in 1995. The single is subtitled En duo avec Marina (In a duet with Marina), as it features Marina Casariego on female vocals.

=== Track listing ===
1. "Tout pour sauver l'amour" (Frege/Casariego) – 4:31
2. "Tout pour sauver l'amour" (French Karaoke Version) – 4:42

== 1996 live version ==
"Alles aus Liebe (live)"

Single by Die Toten Hosen

from the album Im Auftrag des Herrn... - Die Toten Hosen Live
- Released: 10 January 1997
- Genre: Punk rock
- Length: 4:10
- Label: Virgin Records
- Songwriter: Andreas Frege

Die Toten Hosen singles chronology
"Zehn kleine Jägermeister" (1996)	"Alles aus Liebe (live)" (1997)	"Pushed Again" (1998)

A live version of the song is available on the 1996 live album Im Auftrag des Herrn. This was released as the only single from the album in 1997. The single had a crew-T-shirt with it.

=== Music video ===
The video was directed by Sven Offen & DoRo.

=== Track listing ===
1. "Alles aus Liebe" (Frege/Frege) − 4:10
2. "Lügen" (Lies) (Holst/Frege) − 4:03
3. "Seelentherapie" (Soul therapy) (Breitkopf/Frege) – 4:48

=== Charts ===
Chart (1997)	Position
Austria (Ö3 Austria Top 40)	19
Germany (GfK)	20

=== Cover Versions ===
The song was covered by the Polish band Ich Troje with the title "A wszystko to (bo ciebie kocham)". Moreover, a live version of this cover exists in duet with the singer Anna Wyszkoni.

== Certifications ==
In 2023, "Alles aus Liebe" was certified gold in Germany.
