= Homolka =

Homolka is a surname of Czech origin. Notable people with the surname include:

- Karla Homolka (born 1970), Canadian serial rapist and killer
  - Tammy Homolka (1975–1990), Karla's sister and victim
- Oscar Homolka (1898–1978), Austrian-born actor
- Walter Homolka (born 1964), German rabbi
