= Weihnachtsmann vom Dach =

Single by Die Roten Rosen

from the album Wir warten auf's Christkind...
- Released: November 16, 1998
- Genre: Punk rock
- Length: 4:02
- Label: JKP
- Songwriters: Andreas Frege; Andreas von Holst

Die Roten Rosen singles chronology
"Pushed Again" (1998)	"Weihnachtsmann vom Dach" (1998)	"Auld Lang Syne" (1999)

"Weihnachtsmann vom Dach" (Santa Claus from the roof) is a Christmas song by Die Toten Hosen, released as Die Roten Rosen. It's the first single and the sixth track from the Christmas album Wir warten auf's Christkind....

The song is sung from the perspective of somebody that believes a depressed Santa is hiding from Christmas in his attic. On a card he has written "Merry Christmas" and that he hopes everyone's happy and apologises for his escape. Present wrapping is littered around and in his diary he wrote "I am here and Bethlehem is far away".

== Music video ==
The music video was directed by Ralf Schmerberg.

The music video depicts a girl hanging a figurine Santa in her home, as she notices a midget in a Santa costume stealing her presents. She starts chasing him as he notices the Santa doll and is devastated. Then, a life-sized version of a similar Santa is shown hanging in a similar room as the self-made dollhouse had. He is surrounded by others like him, who then visit the girl (probably to seek revenge). The man, who tried to steal the girl's presents then saves her by somehow turning them small, like the figurine, and escaping to a tunnel on a railroad maquette as the lifesize figurine Santas search the house. The Santa-like people leave and the two hug. The next scene shows them ice-skating on the maquette with a man with a similar hat that the Santa-like people were wearing.

== Track listing ==
1. "Weihnachtsmann vom Dach" (von Holst/Frege) − 4:02
2. "Come All Ye Faithful" – 2:34
3. "Jingle Bells (Dub Version)" – 5:34
4. "Baby, du sollst nicht weinen" (Baby, you shouldn't cry) − 3:34

== Charts ==
Year	Country	Position
1998	Germany	39
1998	Austria	19
