= Bayern (song) =

2000 single by Die Toten Hosen

Single by Die Toten Hosen

from the album Unsterblich
- Released: April 10, 2000
- Genre: Pop punk
- Length: 4:16 (album version); 4:19 (single version)
- Label: JKP
- Songwriter(s): Andreas Frege; Funny van Dannen

Die Toten Hosen singles chronology
"Unsterblich" (2000)	"Bayern" (2000)	"Warum werde ich nicht satt?" (2000)

"Bayern" (Bavaria) is a punk hymn by Die Toten Hosen. It's the third single and the sixteenth track from the album Unsterblich.

It is an anti-FC Bayern Munich song. A slogan from this song has become synonymous with DTH among the fans, which can be shortened: "Es kann soviel passieren. Es kann soviel geschehen/Nur eins weiß ich hundertprozentig. Nie im Leben würde ich zu Bayern gehen." (Many things can happen. Many things can come to pass/One thing I know for sure. Never in my life would I go to Bayern. [here meaning the football club]). Spanish club Real Madrid and English club Manchester United are also mentioned in the song, along with Uli Hoeneß, the former sporting director of Bayern Munich.

The Tipp-Kick version is more anthem-like, as it features the line "Wir würden nie zum FC Bayern München gehen" (We would never go to FC Bayern Munich) throughout the song, not only in the end and the emphasis is taken off the I-character (the narrator).

In 2012, Campino mentioned that Die Toten Hosen lost significant CD sales in the South of Germany since the release of the song, and the sales had not yet recovered.

== Music video ==
The music video was directed by Peter Thorwarth. Most of it consists of a friendly football match, where various people (and a dog) take part of, including the band. After the match the band is shown playing at a gig. In the end, a figure in a Bayern jacket is seen (implied to be Uli Hoeneß, the club's president) watching the VHS of the music video, noting "Das ist der Dreck, an dem unsere Gesellschaft irgendwann ersticken wird." ("This is the kind of filth that will choke our society at some point."), an actual quote from Hoeneß about the song.

== Track listing ==
1. "Bayern" (Tipp-Kick Version) (van Dannen, Frege/van Dannen, Frege) − 4:19
2. "Laß doch mal Dampf ab" (Let some steam off for once) (Christian Bruhn/Fred Weyrich) – 2:24 (Gert Fröbe cover)
3. "You'll Never Walk Alone" (Richard Rodgers/Oscar Hammerstein) - 2:36
4. "Hang On Sloopy" (Ferrell, Russolt) - 2:30 (The McCoys cover)

== Charts ==
Year	Country	Position
2000	Germany	8
2000	Switzerland	18
