= Bofrost =

Bofrost Dienstleistungs GmbH und Co. KG (stylised as bofrost*) is a direct sales company specialising in frozen foods and ice cream. The company currently operates in twelve countries.

The company was founded in 1966 by Josef H. Boquoi in Issum, in the Lower Rhine region of Germany.

Its corporate headquarters are located in Straelen, in the Lower Rhine region.

== Positioning ==
In Germany, during the 2024/2025 financial year (1 March 2024 to 28 February 2025), there were 114 branches and 2,910 of specialised refrigerated services which were used to supply approximately 2.03 million households. The company's revenue in Germany amounted to €799.9 million. Bofrost operates in twelve countries in the European Union, with 258 branches, supplying approximately 3.7 million households. The company employs 11,179 people and operates 5,858 specialised frozen food delivery vehicles, generating total revenue of €1.425 billion (as of the 2024/2025 financial year).
