= Warum werde ich nicht satt? =

Single by Die Toten Hosen

from the album Unsterblich
- Released: September 11, 2000
- Genre: Punk rock, heavy metal, thrash metal, punk jazz
- Length: 3:28
- Label: JKP
- Songwriters: Andreas Frege; Michael Breitkopf; Andreas von Holst

Die Toten Hosen singles chronology
"Bayern" (2000)	"Warum werde ich nicht satt?" (2000)	"Was zählt" (2001)

"Warum werde ich nicht satt?" (roughly Why am I not satisfied?) is a song by Die Toten Hosen. It is the fourth single and the third track from the album Unsterblich.

It is narrated by a wealthy man, who nevertheless is not happy with what he has and contemplates, why he is not fed up yet with all of it.

== Music video ==
The music video was directed by Wim Wenders.

Campino plays a rich, successful man, who lives in a futuristic house with a sexy woman (Michaela Schaffrath). During the chorus he is seen in a normal middle-class home. Later in the song he begins to decrease in size, whereas the persona in the middle-class apartment starts to grow.

== Track listing ==
1. "Warum werde ich nicht satt?" (Breitkopf, von Holst/Frege) − 3:28
2. "Babylon's Burning" (Jennings, Ruffy, Owen, Fox) − 4:25 (The Ruts cover)
3. "Should I Stay or Should I Go" (Mick Jones/Joe Strummer) − 2:43 (The Clash cover)

== Charts ==
Chart performance for "Warum werde ich nicht satt?"
Chart (2000)	Peak position
Germany (GfK)	38
