= Unsterblich (song) =

Single by Die Toten Hosen

from the album Unsterblich
- Released: 24 January 2000
- Genre: Alternative rock, emo
- Length: 3:46
- Label: JKP
- Songwriter(s): Andreas Frege; Andreas von Holst

Die Toten Hosen singles chronology
"Schön sein" (1999)	"Unsterblich" (2000)	"Bayern" (2000)

"Unsterblich" (Immortal) is a ballad by Die Toten Hosen. It's the second single and the tenth track from the album Unsterblich.

It is a love song, in which the narrator sings, how he feels like he were immortal, when he's with his beloved.

The CD-ROM track consists of the video of the single, a making-of film and photos.

== Music video ==
The music video was directed by Peter Lindbergh and cinematographed by Darius Khondji. Shot on the Cornish coast, the video consists only of the camera holding on Campino's face, as he sings. At the end of the video Campino morphs into French model (and Lindbergh muse) Marie-Sophie Wilson.

== Track listing ==
1. "Unsterblich" (Frege, von Holst/Frege) − 3:46
2. "Wofür man lebt (Dub-Version)" (What for one lives) (von Holst, Meurer/Frege) − 3:22
3. "Psycho" (Roslie/Roslie) − 1:44 (The Sonics cover)
4. "Unsterblich" (Video + CD-ROM Track)

== Charts ==
Chart (2000)	Position
Germany (GfK)	31
Switzerland (Schweizer Hitparade)	80
