= Freunde (song) =

Single by Die Toten Hosen

from the album Zurück zum Glück
- Released: 30 May 2005
- Genre: Alternative rock
- Length: 4:01
- Label: JKP
- Songwriters: Andreas Frege; Andreas von Holst

Die Toten Hosen singles chronology
"Alles wird vorübergehen" (2005)	"Freunde" (2005)	"Hier kommt Alex (unplugged)" (2005)

"Freunde" (Friends) is a song by Die Toten Hosen. It's the fourth single and the twelfth track from the album Zurück zum Glück.

The song is a hymn and an ode to friendship overall.

== Music video ==
The music video was directed by Sven Bollinger. It shows the band walking to an empty office building, where they then perform the song. In between photos of friends are shown.

== Track listing ==
1. "Freunde" (Frege, von Holst/Frege) − 3:11
2. "Irgendjemand, nur nicht ich" (Somebody, just not me) (von Holst/Frege) - 3:07
3. "The Guns of Brixton" (Paul Simonon/Simonon) - 3:00 (The Clash cover)

== Charts ==
Year	Country	Position
2005	Germany	33
2005	Switzerland	42
