= Bonnie & Clyde (Die Toten Hosen song) =

Single by Die Toten Hosen

from the album Opium fürs Volk
- Released: May 24, 1996
- Genre: Punk rock, hard rock
- Length: 3:30
- Label: JKP
- Songwriter(s): Andreas Frege; Michael Breitkopf

Die Toten Hosen singles chronology
| "Paradies" (1996) | "Bonnie & Clyde" (1996) | "Zehn kleine Jägermeister" (1996) |

"Bonnie & Clyde" is a song by Die Toten Hosen released in 1996. It's the third single and the ninth track from the album Opium fürs Volk.

"Bonnie & Clyde" is a romantic song about a man and a woman, who want to play Bonnie and Clyde - criminals that are in love with each other. At the start of the song, the two have never met before, but the man knows she's the one he's been missing.

An English version was recorded for Crash-Landing.

Die Ärzte covered the song as a part of a medley in a concert of 1998, which is available on the single of "Die Schönen und das Biest: Elke (live)".

== Music video ==
The music video was directed by Ralf Schmerberg.

The video starts of arrest and lockup sequence when police apprehends a young couple of a wannabe "Bonnie" (played by Lea Mornar) and a wannabe "Clyde" (played by Andreas "Campino" Frege). In detention both of them recall moments of their common love and crime history. As their story unfolds, it loosely follows the lyrics. They met at a bar and click instantaneously. They steal a car, rob a money transport, and then go to a motel and make love until the morning after. The police break in to arrest them. They are jailed, but escape later with the help of their bandmates. Shootout ensues, "Bonnie" gets shot in her shoulder, and the gang tries to escape in a car (with "ON TOUR" written on it), but the driver (played by Andreas "Andi" Meurer) also gets shot and they crash the car, which explodes, matching the last lines of the lyrics referring the love of Bonnie & Clyde shall be like explosive blasting forever.

== Track listing ==
1. "Bonnie & Clyde" (Breitkopf/Frege) − 3:30
2. "Kleiner Junge" (Little boy) (von Holst/Frege) − 3:58
3. "Herzglück harte Welle" (roughly Heartluck strong wave) (Rohde/Frege) – 1:57
4. "Do You Love Me" (Stanley, Ezrin, Fowley) − 3:11 (Kiss cover)

== Charts ==
| Year | Country | Position |
|---|---|---|
| 1996 | Germany | 33 |
