= Hans Neleman =

Dutch photographer (born 1960)

Hans Neleman (born 30 May 1960, Vlaardingen) is a Dutch-born international photographer and film director who lives in Connecticut and working in New York City. He is also the founder of boutique stock photography agency Win-initiative and its promotional magazine, WINk.

== Biography ==
Neleman studied Fine Art at the Goldsmiths College of Art in London, England and specialized in photography and film while at the Polytechnic of Central London (now University of Westminster). Neleman then pursued studio arts at the master level at New York University before establishing himself in his field.

Neleman's personal work includes still lifes and assemblages, while his commercial work has included fashion and celebrity portraiture, as well as advertising campaigns for clients like Nike, American Express and Sony. In the 90s, Neleman also directed several music videos for bands like Toad the Wet Sprocket, The Judybats, and Die Toten Hosen.

Neleman has also had several books published. His first, Moko: Maori Tattoo (1999), delved into the world of the Maori. Silence (2000) features the photographer's unique still lifes and Night Chicas (2003) explores the world of prostitutes in Guatemala.

Neleman has most recently branched out from his photography. He first founded a boutique stock photography agency, WIN-Initiative, centered around youth culture imagery, and launched a quarterly online magazine, WINk. An international photography competition, 10 BEST 10, soon followed. Neleman also co-created an iPhone app for obtaining digital releases, iD Release

== Exhibitions ==
- 2016 Lumière de L’Aube – Musee d’art contemporain de Lyon, France
- 2016 Royal Ontario Museum, Canada
- 2015 Biennale de Lyon, France
- 2015 Musee d’art contemporain de Lyon, France
- 2014 Musee du quai Branly, Paris, France
- 2013 National Gallery of Australia, Canberra, Australia
- 2009 Peabody Essex Museum, Salem, Massachusetts
- 2003 Ricco/Maresca Gallery, New York
- 2000 Musee d’art contemporain de Lyon, France
- 2000 Biennale de Lyon, France
- 1999 Holland Festival, Netherlands
- 1999 Cultura De Nuevo León y Drexel Galeria, Mexico
- 1998 Tabakman Gallery New York
- 1995 Schneider Gallery, Chicago
- 1994 Art Projects International, New York
- 1993 Eton Gallery Detroit, Michigan
- 1991 Visual Arts Museum, New York

== Books ==
- 1999 Moko – Maori Tattoo, ISBN 3-908161-96-7
- 2000 Silence, ISBN 3-908163-30-7
- 2003 Night Chicas, ISBN 1-932026-05-3

== Articles ==
- http://www.3ammagazine.com/artarchives/2004/jun/interview_hans_neleman.html

Trust ,3am Magazine 2004, Interview with Hans Neleman and Richard Marshall

- https://web.archive.org/web/20100719063845/http://www.hasselbladusa.com/masters-2006/october---hans-neleman.aspx

Hasselblad Masters: October 2006

- http://pdngallery.com/legends3/neleman/

PDN: Legends Online

- http://www.eagletribune.com/lifestyle/x1876420849/Faces-of-pride-Exhibit-features-photos-of-Maori-people-embracing-their-roots

Faces of Pride Eagle Tribune online Magazine, February 2008, Interview with Hans Neleman and Michelle Morrissey

- http://pdngallery.com/legends3/index_intro.html

PDN Compare Hans Neleman and Duane Michals

- http://aesthetic.gregcookland.com/2008/03/hans-neleman.html

The New England Journal of Aesthetic Research, Hans Neleman's Maori
