= Steh auf, wenn du am Boden bist =

Single by Die Toten Hosen

from the album Auswärtsspiel
- Released: April 22, 2002
- Genre: Punk rock
- Length: 3:51
- Label: JKP
- Songwriters: Andreas Frege; Andreas von Holst

Die Toten Hosen singles chronology
"Kein Alkohol (ist auch keine Lösung)!" (2002)	"Steh auf, wenn du am Boden bist" (2002)	"Nur zu Besuch" (2002)

"Steh auf, wenn du am Boden bist" (Get up when you're on the ground) is a song by Die Toten Hosen. It's the third single and the thirteenth track from the album Auswärtsspiel.

Campino has stated that the reason behind this song is that he had a line like "Walk on with hope in your heart" in his head and it didn't seem weird in English and what he wanted was to create something similar.

An English version, titled "Stand Up", was recorded for the soundtrack of Land of Plenty.

== Music video ==
The music video was directed by Olaf Heine.

The video is black-and-white and shows the band performing the song, which is interspersed with clips of depressed people, who start to smile as the song is nearing the end.

== Track listing ==
1. "Steh auf, wenn du am Boden bist" (von Holst/Frege) − 3:51
2. "Leben im Bildausschnitt" (Life in a picture detail) (Meurer/Frege) – 3:05
3. "Dankbar - Live" (Grateful) (Breitkopf, von Holst/Frege) − 2:46
4. "Call of the Wild - Live" (Breitkopf/Frege, T.V. Smith) − 3:11

== Charts ==
Year	Country	Position
2002	Germany	27
