= Mehr davon =

Single by Die Toten Hosen

from the album Ein kleines bisschen Horrorschau
- Released: 1992
- Genre: Punk rock, hardcore punk
- Length: 5:10
- Label: Virgin Records
- Songwriter(s): Andreas Frege; Andreas von Holst

Die Toten Hosen singles chronology
"If the Kids Are United" (1992)	"Mehr davon" (1992)	"Sascha ...ein aufrechter Deutscher" (1992)

"Mehr davon" (More of it) is a song by Die Toten Hosen. It is the seventh track on the album Ein kleines bisschen Horrorschau. It was also released as a promo single "We Love You / Mehr davon" in 1992 with a cover of the Rolling Stones.

It is about wanting more money, reputation, speed, hate, sex and power.

Initially it was not released as a single from the album, but it became popular and this is probably the reason behind the 1992 promo single. A "Dreadlock-Mix" was released on Auf dem Kreuzzug ins Glück. An English version, titled "More & More", is available on Love, Peace & Money.

== Track listing ==
A: "We Love You" (Jagger/Richards) − 3:10 (The Rolling Stones cover)
B: "Mehr davon" (von Holst/Frege) - 5:10
