= Kauf MICH! =

Studio album by Die Toten Hosen
- Released: 1993; 2007 (jubilee edition)
- Recorded: 1992–1993
- Studio: Studio Dierks (Stommeln)
- Genres: Punk rock, melodic hardcore
- Length: 54:01; 79:17 (re-release)
- Labels: ToT; Virgin Records
- Producers: John Caffery, Die Toten Hosen

Die Toten Hosen chronology
The Nightmare Continues E.P. (1991)	Kauf MICH! (1993)	Reich & sexy (1993)

Singles from Kauf MICH!
- 1. "Sascha ...ein aufrechter Deutscher" Released: 14 December 1992; 2. "Wünsch DIR was" Released: 26 April 1993; 3. "Alles aus Liebe" Released: 16 August 1993; 4. "Kauf MICH!" Released: 18 May 1994

Kauf MICH! ("Buy ME!") is the ninth album by Die Toten Hosen, released in 1993. The LP is mainly a concept album dealing with consumerism and ultraconservatism. Along with the album's art and several songs addressing commerce, satirical advertisements and infomercials are interspersed among the music. In addition, the concept of right wing extremism as exemplified by ultraconservatism and neo-Nazism in the songs "Wilkommen in Deutschland" and "Sascha ...ein aufrechter Deutscher" is explored, which excited controversy during the time of the album's release. It was a best-selling album in Germany for 13 weeks in 1993, also selling well in Austria and Switzerland.

Tracks 6 and 8 are mock infomercials performed by Gerhard Polt and Gisela Schneeberger and directed by Hanns Christian Müller. "Wünsch DIR was" has an intro sung by the children's choir "Mosquito" from the music school in Meerbusch.

The single "Kauf MICH! charted in 1994 in Germany at number 34.

== Track listing ==
All lyrics are written by Andreas Frege, except where noted.

No.	Title	Lyrics	Music	Length
1.	"Umtausch ausgeschlossen!" (roughly "No Exchanges!" in a retail sense)		Wolfgang Rohde	2:18
2.	"Niemals einer Meinung" ("Never of the Same Opinion")		Frege	3:44
3.	"Hot-Clip-Video-Club"		Rohde	4:01
4.	"Willkommen in Deutschland" ("Welcome to Germany")		Michael Breitkopf	3:56
5.	"Drunter, drauf & drüber" ("Under, On and Over")	Frege; Hanns Christian Müller	Frege; Müller; W. Thal	3:02
6.	"Erotim-Super-3-feucht" ("ES3-damp"; skit)	Müller		0:31
7.	"Kauf MICH!" ("Buy ME!")	Frege; Müller	Breitkopf	3:30
8.	"Die Homolka Kettensäge" ("The Homolka Chainsaw"; skit)	Müller		0:36
9.	"Sascha ... ein aufrechter Deutscher" ("Sascha ... an upstanding German")	Frege; Müller	Frege; Müller	2:34
10.	"Gewissen" ("Conscience")	Frege; Müller	Breitkopf	2:41
11.	"Gute Reise" ("A Good Trip")		Andreas von Holst	5:04
12.	"Alles aus Liebe" ("All out of Love")		Frege	4:34
13.	"Wünsch DIR was" (roughly "Make a Wish")		Andreas Meurer	4:15
14.	"Mein größter Feind" ("My Biggest Enemy")		von Holst	3:08
15.	"Rambo-Dance"		Meurer	4:09
16.	"Katastrophen-Kommando" ("Catastrophe Commando")		von Holst	4:30
17.	"Der letzte Tag" ("The Last Day"; hidden track; separate track on the remastered version)		Meurer	3:28
Total length:				54:01

=== 2007 remastered anniversary edition bonus tracks ===
For the 25th anniversary of the group, all albums from 1983 to 2002 were remastered and re-released. The remasters have a second booklet and additional songs. The re-release of Kauf MICH! features the album's B-sides as bonus tracks. There are actually 3 parts of "Der heiße Draht", on which people sing DTH songs over the phone. However, for the remaster, only a "best of" was compiled out of the three.

No.	Title	Lyrics	Music	Original A-side	Length
18.	"Krieg und Frieden" ("War and Peace")		Meurer	"...wünsch DIR was"	4:58
19.	"Im Namen des Herrn" ("In the Name of the Lord")		Frege	"...wünsch DIR was"	2:08
20.	"Auf dem Weg zur Nummer 1" ("On the Way to Number 1")		Rohde	"Alles aus Liebe"	4:01
21.	"5 Minuten" ("5 Minutes")		von Holst	"Alles aus Liebe"	3:01
22.	"Hilfe" ("Help")		von Holst	"Kauf MICH!"	3:24
23.	"Der heiße Draht (Best of)" (The Hot Wire)	Various	Various	"Kauf MICH!"	6:09
Total length:					79:17

== Demos ==
Several unreleased demos from the album surfaced in 2007 with the re-release of most DTH albums.

- "Das kleine ABC" (The little ABC) (von Holst/Frege) – 3:34 (released on Damenwahl)
- "Aufgeben (gilt nicht)" (Giving up (is not a choice)) (Frege/Frege) – 5:01 (released on Damenwahl)
- "Gipfelstürmer" (Summiteer) (Meurer/Frege) – 3:45 (released on Damenwahl)
- "Einmal in vier Jahren" (Once in four years) (Breitkopf/Frege) – 4:49 (released on Ein kleines bisschen Horrorschau)
- "Schwarze Sheriffs" (Black sheriffs) (Frege/von Holst) – 3:39 (released on Ein kleines bisschen Horrorschau)

"Einmal in vier Jahren" has been previously available in a live version on Im Auftrag des Herrn.

== Personnel ==
- Campino - vocals
- Andreas von Holst - guitar
- Michael Breitkopf - guitar
- Andreas Meurer - bass
- Wolfgang Rohde - drums

== Charts ==
Year	Country	Position
1993	Germany	1
1993	Switzerland	5
1993	Austria	9
