= Wir warten auf's Christkind... =

Studio album by Die Roten Rosen
- Released: October 26, 1998
- Genre: Punk rock; hardcore punk; melodic hardcore; Christmas music
- Length: 58:05
- Label: JKP
- Producer: Jon Caffery & Die Roten Rosen

Die Roten Rosen chronology
Im Auftrag des Herrn... - Die Toten Hosen Live (1996)	Wir warten auf's Christkind... (1998)	Soul Therapy (1998)

Wir warten auf's Christkind... or Wir warten auf's Christkind (We're waiting for the Christ-child) is a Christmas album by the German punk band Die Toten Hosen, released under the alias Die Roten Rosen (the second time the alias is used; the first time was on a cover album).

For Australia, a version with an English language title Waiting for Santa Claus... or Waiting for Santa Claus, subtitled a Christmas album, was released, under the name Die Toten Hosen, not Die Roten Rosen.

Many of the traditional Christmas songs have altered lyrics, having themes like drugs ("Ihr Kinderlein kommet", "Leise rieselt der Schnee") or orgasming ("Jingle Bells"). "Ave Maria" is an instrumental intro. "Leise rieselt der Schnee", "Alle Jahre wieder" and "Frohes Fest" originally appeared on the single of "Sascha ...ein aufrechter Deutscher"; here they are re-recorded, the first two sounding much more like rock, and "Frohes Fest" has slightly different lyrics. "Still, still, still" is sung by Kuddel in a harsh voice.

The album is inspired by The Yobs Christmas Album, which is in concept very similar to Wir warten...: it was released by the Boys under a pseudonym (The Yobs), includes traditional Christmas song covers and a couple of original songs and the lyrics are changed to sound offensive.

== Track listing ==
1. "Ave Maria" − 1:56
2. "Stille Nacht, heilige Nacht" (Silent night, holy night) − 1:50
3. "Ihr Kinderlein kommet" (O come, little children) − 1:40
4. "Oh Tannenbaum" (Oh Christmas tree) − 1:20
5. "Merry X-Mas Everybody" (Jim Lea, Noddy Holder) − 3:19 (Slade cover)
6. "Weihnachtsmann vom Dach" (Santa Claus from the roof) (von Holst/Frege) − 4:02
7. "Auld Lang Syne" − 2:32
8. "The Little Drummer Boy" − 3:49
9. "Leise rieselt der Schnee" (roughly Quietly falls the snow) − 2:55
10. "Alle Jahre wieder" (Every year again) − 1:28
11. "Frohes Fest" (roughly Merry celebration) (von Holst/Frege) − 3:41
12. "White Christmas" (Irving Berlin) − 3:49 (Bing Crosby cover)
13. "Weihnachten bei den Brandts" (Christmas with the Brandts) (Breitkopf/Frege) − 3:42
14. "Hark! The Herald Angels Sing" − 2:20
15. "We Wish You a Merry Christmas" − 3:07
16. "In Dulci Jubilo" (Medley: Jubilo, Oh du Fröhliche, Vom Himmel hoch...) (In sweetest rejoicing [in Latin]; "Oh du Fröhliche" - Oh you joyous; "Vom Himmel hoch" - From the Heaven high above) − 5:28
17. "Happy Xmas (War Is Over)" (John Lennon/Yoko Ono) − 2:38 (John Lennon cover)
18. "Jingle Bells" − 3:09
19. "I Wish It Could Be Christmas Every Day" (Roy Wood) − 3:52 (Wizzard cover)
20. "Still, still, still" (Silent, silent, silent) − 1:28

=== 2007 remastered anniversary edition bonus tracks ===
21. "Come All Ye Faithful" – 2:34 (from "Weihnachtsmann vom Dach")
22. "The Little Drummer Boy (unplugged)" – 2:42 (from "Auld Lang Syne")
23. "Auld Lang Syne (unplugged)" – 3:17 (from "Auld Lang Syne")
24. "Alle Jahre wieder" – 1:30 (from "Sascha ...ein aufrechter Deutscher")
25. "Leise rieselt der Schnee" – 1:33 (from "Sascha ...ein aufrechter Deutscher")
26. "Jingle Bells (Dub Version)" – 5:34 (from "Weihnachtsmann vom Dach")

== Singles ==
1998: "Weihnachtsmann vom Dach"
1999: "Auld Lang Syne"

== Personnel ==
- Campino - vocals
- Andreas von Holst - guitar, vocals on 20
- Michael Breitkopf - guitar
- Andreas Meurer - bass
- Wolfgang Rohde - drums
- Vom Ritchie - drums

== Charts ==
Year	Country	Position
1998	Germany	4
1998	Austria	2
1998	Switzerland	25
