= Pushed Again =

Single by Die Toten Hosen

from the album Crash-Landing
- Released: 5 January 1998
- Genre: Melodic hardcore, punk rock
- Length: 3:49
- Label: JKP
- Songwriter(s): Andreas Frege; Michael Breitkopf

Die Toten Hosen singles chronology
"Alles aus Liebe (live)" (1997)	"Pushed Again" (1998)	"Weihnachtsmann vom Dach" (1998)

"Pushed Again" is a song by Die Toten Hosen. It is the only single and the fifth track from the album Crash-Landing.

The song is about being tormented by somebody and trying to get this somebody off the narrator's back.

== Music video ==
The music video was directed by Ralf Schmerberg. It shows the band performing, interspersed with clips of many different cases of riots, police brutality and violation of human rights in many countries, i.e. notably in China.

== Track listing ==
1. "Pushed Again" (Breitkopf/Andreas Frege) − 3:49
2. "Alles ist eins" (All is one) (von Holst/Frege) − 3:21
3. "Fliegen" (Flying) (Frege/Frege) – 4:28
4. "Revenge" (Meurer/Frege, T.V. Smith) − 3:59

== Charts ==
Year	Country	Position
1998	Germany	4
1998	Switzerland	10
1998	Austria	20

=== Year-end charts ===
Chart (1998)	Position
Germany (Official German Charts)	44
