= Wünsch DIR was =

"...wünsch DIR was"

Single by Die Toten Hosen

from the album Kauf MICH!
- Released: April 26, 1993
- Genre: Punk rock
- Length: 4:15
- Label: Virgin Records
- Songwriter(s): Andreas Frege; Andreas Meurer

Die Toten Hosen singles chronology
"Sascha ...ein aufrechter Deutscher" (1992)	"...wünsch DIR was" (1993)	"Alles aus Liebe" (1993)

"Wünsch DIR was" (roughly Make a wish; lit. Wish YOURSELF something) is a song by Die Toten Hosen. It's the second single and the thirteenth track from the album Kauf MICH!.

The intro of the song is sung by the children's choir "Mosquito" from the music school in Meerbusch.

The song is generally about hope for a better world and anticipation of a time, when wishing helps again. According to Campino, the song was meant to be ironic however.

== Music video ==
The video was directed by Hans Neleman. It features scenes on a beach and at a funfair; also various circus freaks are shown.

== Track listing ==
1. "Wünsch DIR was" (Meurer/Frege) – 4:15
2. "Krieg und Frieden" (War and peace) (Meurer/Frege) − 4:58
3. "Im Namen des Herrn" (In the name of the Lord) (Frege/Frege) − 2:08
4. "Wahre Liebe" (True love) (Rohde/Frege) - 3:29

== Charts ==
Chart (1993)	Position
Germany (GfK)	28
Switzerland (Schweizer Hitparade)	26
