= Opium fürs Volk =

Studio album by Die Toten Hosen
- Released: 26 January 1996; 2007 (jubilee edition)
- Genre: Punk rock, hardcore punk, alternative metal, heavy metal, pop-punk
- Length: 66:54; 76:01 (re-release)
- Label: JKP
- Producer: Jon Caffery & Die Toten Hosen

Die Toten Hosen chronology
| Musik war ihr Hobby (1995) | Opium fürs Volk (1996) | Im Auftrag des Herrn... - Die Toten Hosen Live (1996) |

Singles from Opium fürs Volk
- 1. "Nichts bleibt für die Ewigkeit" Released: 8 December 1995; 2. "Paradies" Released: 8 March 1996; 3. "Bonnie & Clyde" Released: 24 May 1996; 4. "Zehn kleine Jägermeister" Released: 6 September 1996

Opium fürs Volk (Opium for the people) is the seventh studio album by the German punk band Die Toten Hosen. Although it's not considered a concept album, it has a central theme of religion (exemplified by the intro "Vaterunser", "Die zehn Gebote" and "Paradies"). It is regarded as one of the best Die Toten Hosen albums. The title is derived from a common misquotation of Karl Marx, who called religion the Opium of the People - Opium des Volkes.

== Track listing ==
1. "Vaterunser" (Our Father) (Traditional) − 1:10
2. "Mensch" (Man) (von Holst/Frege) − 4:08
3. "Die Fliege" (The fly) (Frege/Frege) − 1:54
4. "Die zehn Gebote" (The ten commandments) (Rohde/Frege) − 4:04
5. "Böser Wolf" (roughly Big Bad Wolf) (von Holst/Frege) − 4:02
6. "Nichts bleibt für die Ewigkeit" (Nothing lasts forever) (von Holst, Frege/Müller, von Holst, Frege) − 4:10
7. "Ewig währt am längsten (Dub)" (lit. Forever lasts the longest; a pun on Ehrlich währt am längsten [roughly Honesty is the best policy]) (Meurer/Müller, von Holst, Frege) − 2:54
8. "Und so weiter" (And so on) (Rohde/Frege, Müller) − 1:40
9. "Bonnie & Clyde" (Breitkopf/Frege) − 3:30
10. "Der Froschkönig" (The Frog Prince) (Breitkopf/Frege) − 3:47
11. "XTC" (Meurer/Frege) − 4:16
12. "Lügen" (Lies) (von Holst/Frege) − 4:12
13. "Paradies" (Paradise) (Frege/Frege) − 4:08
14. "Und wir leben" (And we're living) (Meurer/Frege) − 3:50
15. "Er denkt, sie denkt" (He thinks, she thinks) (Frege/Frege) − 4:34
16. "Seelentherapie" (Soul therapy) (Breitkopf/Frege) − 5:13
17. "Viva la Revolution" (Breitkopf/Frege) − 4:46
18. "Zehn kleine Jägermeister" (roughly Ten little hunters/Jägermeisters, a pun on Ten Little Indians) (Rohde/Müller, Frege) − 4:45

=== 2007 remastered anniversary edition bonus tracks ===
19. "Fliegen" (Flying) (Frege/Frege) – 4:28 (from "Pushed Again")
20. "Prominentenpsychose" (Celebrity psychosis) (Frege/Frege) – 3:14 (from "Nichts bleibt für die Ewigkeit")
21. "Herzglück harte Welle" (roughly Heartluck strong wave) (Rohde/Frege) – 1:57 (from "Bonnie & Clyde")

== Demos ==
One unreleased demo from the album surfaced in 2007 with the re-release of Auf dem Kreuzzug ins Glück.

- "Kitsch" (Breitkopf/Frege) – 3:53

== Personnel ==
- Campino - vocals
- Andreas von Holst - guitar
- Michael Breitkopf - guitar
- Andreas Meurer - bass
- Wolfgang Rohde - drums

== Charts ==
| Year | Country | Position |
|---|---|---|
| 1996 | Germany | 1 |
| 1996 | Switzerland | 2 |
| 1996 | Austria | 3 |

2026 chart performance for Opium fürs Volk
| Chart (2026) | Peak position |
|---|---|
| German Albums (Offizielle Top 100) | 1 |
| German Rock & Metal Albums (Offizielle Top 100) | 1 |
