= Nur zu Besuch =

Single by Die Toten Hosen

from the album Auswärtsspiel
- Released: July 29, 2002
- Genre: Acoustic rock, soft rock, emo
- Length: 4:29
- Label: JKP
- Songwriter(s): Andreas Frege; Andreas von Holst

Die Toten Hosen singles chronology
"Steh auf, wenn du am Boden bist" (2002)	"Nur zu Besuch" (2002)	"Frauen dieser Welt" (2002)

"Nur zu Besuch" (Just visiting) is a song by Die Toten Hosen. It's the fourth single and the eleventh track from the album Auswärtsspiel.

It is a tribute to someone who has recently died. The narrator, being at the grave at the time, expresses the sadness over it, love for the deceased and knows that in time it will go by and "the sun will shine again". The song is dedicated to Campino's mother Jennie.

== Music video ==
The music video was directed by Olaf Heine.

In the video, Campino is sadly walking through a ghost town, till he meets another, smiling self, who slaps him to make him understand, that life isn't over, so people reappear on the streets and Campino seems to lighten up.

== Track listing ==
1. "Nur zu Besuch" (Frege, von Holst/Frege) − 4:29
2. "Runaway Train Driver" (Smith/Smith) – 3:11 (T.V. Smith cover)
3. "Hirnfick (Futter für die Fische)" (Brainfuck (Food for the fish)) (von Holst/Frege) – 3:17
4. "Nur zu Besuch" (Instrumental) - 3:18

== Charts ==
Year	Country	Position
2002	Germany	17
2002	Austria	50
