= Ballast der Republik =

Studio album by Die Toten Hosen
- Released: 4 May 2012
- Genres: Punk rock, alternative rock, melodic hardcore
- Length: 52:51
- Label: JKP

Die Toten Hosen chronology
La hermandad – en el principio fue el ruido (2009)	Ballast der Republik (2012)	Krach der Republik (2013)

Ballast der Republik (Burden Of The Republic, pun on Pallast der Republik) is a 2012 album by the German punk band Die Toten Hosen. It was their first studio album since 2008's In aller Stille. In order to commemorate the band's 30th anniversary, the album was also released as a special edition with a second CD, titled Die Geister, die wir riefen, containing 15 cover versions of songs and literature by artists that influenced and inspired the members of the band.

The name 'Ballast der Republik' is wordplay, alluding to the Palast der Republik, the parliament building of communist East Germany.

A single release of "Altes Fieber" was successful and appeared on the Billboard Hits of the World chart for Germany.

== Track listing ==
1. "Drei Kreuze (dass wir hier sind)" ("Three crosses (that we're here)") – 1:27
2. "Ballast der Republik" ("Burden of the Republic") – 2:39
3. "Tage wie diese" ("Days like these") – 4:28
4. "Traurig einen Sommer Lang" ("Sad for a whole summer") – 3:03
5. "Altes Fieber" ("Old fever") – 3:30
6. "Zwei Drittel Liebe" ("Two thirds of love") – 3:32
7. "Europa" ("Europe") – 2:49
8. "Reiß Dich los" ("Tear yourself away") – 2:54
9. "Drei Worte" ("Three words") – 3:39
10. "Schade, wie kann das passieren?" ("Pity, how can this happen?") – 3:40
11. "Draußen vor der Tür" ("Outside at the door") – 3:03
12. "Das ist der Moment" ("This is the moment") – 3:00
13. "Ein guter Tag zum Fliegen" ("A good day for flying") – 3:31
14. "Oberhausen" – 4:17
15. "Alles hat seinen Grund" ("There's a reason for everything" – literally: "Everything has its reason") – 3:38
16. "Vogelfrei" ("Outlawed" – literally: "free as a bird") – 3:37

== Die Geister, die wir riefen (The spirits we summoned) ==
1. "Computerstaat" ("Computerstate") – 2:30 (Abwärts)
2. "Sirenen" ("Sirens") – 1:53 (Male)
3. "Das Model" ("The model") – 2:28 (Kraftwerk)
4. "Die Moorsoldaten" ("Peat Bog Soldiers") – 3:17
  (Rudi Goguel / Johann Esser, Wolfgang Langhoff)
5. "Im Nebel" ("In the fog") – 2:42 (Musik: Campino / Text: Hermann Hesse)
6. "Heute hier, morgen dort" ("Here today, gone tomorrow") – literally: Today here, tomorrow there – 2:16 (Hannes Wader)
7. "Rock Me Amadeus" – 2:41 (Falco)
8. "Industrie-Mädchen" ("Industrial girl") – 1:53 (S.Y.P.H.)
9. "Keine Macht für Niemand" ("No power for nobody") – 2:34 (Ton Steine Scherben)
10. "Einen großen Nazi hat sie!" ("She's got a big Nazi") – 2:14
  (Stephan Weiß / Fritz Grünbaum)
11. "Schrei nach Liebe" ("Cry for love") – 3:24 (Die Ärzte)
12. "Manche Frauen" ("Some women") – 2:49 (Funny van Dannen)
13. "Innenstadt Front" ("Inner city front") – 1:05 (Mittagspause)
14. "Stimmen aus dem Massengrab" ("Voices from the mass grave") – 2:18
  (Musik: Campino / Text: Erich Kästner)
15. "Lasset uns singen" ("Let us sing") – 3:33
  (Musik: Campino, von Holst /
  Text: Graf Zirben, Destilie van der Vogelbeer)

== Personnel ==
- Campino – vocals
- Andreas von Holst – electric guitar
- Michael Breitkopf – electric guitar
- Andreas Meurer – bass guitar
- Vom Ritchie – drums
- Thomas Schmitz – cello
- Constanze Sannemüller – violin
- Adrian Bleyer – violin
- Iryna Bayeva – viola

== Charts ==
=== Weekly charts ===
Chart (2012)	Peak position
Austrian Albums (Ö3 Austria)	1
German Albums (Offizielle Top 100)	1
Swiss Albums (Schweizer Hitparade)	1

=== Year-end charts ===
Chart (2012)	Position
Austrian Albums (Ö3 Austria)	5
German Albums (Offizielle Top 100)	1
Swiss Albums (Schweizer Hitparade)	4

Chart (2013)	Position
Austrian Albums (Ö3 Austria)	58
German Albums (Offizielle Top 100)	19
Swiss Albums (Schweizer Hitparade)	22

=== Decade-end charts ===
Chart (2010–2019)	Position
German Albums (Offizielle Top 100)	9

== Certifications ==
Region	Certification	Certified units/sales
Austria (IFPI Austria)	Platinum	20,000^{*}
Germany (BVMI)	9× Gold	900,000^{‡}
Switzerland (IFPI Switzerland)	Platinum	30,000^{^}
^{*} Sales figures based on certification alone.^{^} Shipments figures based on certification alone.^{‡} Sales+streaming figures based on certification alone.
