= Zehn kleine Jägermeister =

Single by Die Toten Hosen

from the album Opium fürs Volk
- Released: 10 June 1996
- Genre: Reggae rock, pop punk
- Length: 4:45 (album version); 4:21 (single version)
- Label: JKP
- Songwriters: Andreas Frege; Wolfgang Rohde; Hanns Christian Müller

Die Toten Hosen singles chronology
"Bonnie & Clyde" (1996)	"Zehn kleine Jägermeister" (1996)	"Alles aus Liebe (live)" (1997)

"Zehn kleine Jägermeister" (German: Ten Little Huntsmen/Jägermeisters) is a song by German punk rock group Die Toten Hosen. It was released in June 1996 as the fourth single from the album Opium fürs Volk. It is the band's biggest hit, reaching number one on German, Austrian and Swiss charts.

== Content ==
It's a drinking song, and the fact that drinking songs are a tradition for Die Toten Hosen is ironized on the album version as an interview in the beginning and end of the song.

The song's title and theme are a parody of "Zehn kleine Negerlein" (Ten little negroes), which is a song about how out of ten characters only one was left in the end; the parody lies in the improbable manner of their removals: killed by smoking cannabis, died for an inheritance, killed in a road accident, killed by the husband of a date, imprisoned for avoiding taxes, killed by a policeman, killed in a military drinking game, killed by mad cow disease, and finally rejected for asylum.

The chorus also makes use of the German translation of the Unus pro omnibus, omnes pro uno: "Einer für alle, alle für einen", as well as alluding to the board game Mensch ärgere dich nicht.

== Music video ==
A music video for the song was directed by Ralf Schmerberg and animated by Andreas Hykade. It is an adult animated illustration of the lyrics that depicts deer as Jägermeisters. During the chorus, a liquid's path through a mouth is shown. Along the way, the band members are seen drinking.

The video follows the lyrics and is divided into sections beginning with a group of Jägermeisters performing a dance routine. Their number decreases verse by verse, as they each get into different situations which always end with a violent death of one of them. At the end of the video, the only surviving Jägermeister invites nine new Jägermeisters. ("Drum lud er sich zum Osterfest neun neue Meister ein") This differs from the original album lyrics, which end with the death of the second-last Jägermeister, followed by the refrain.

The video was censored by MTV Germany due to scenes containing illegal drugs, nudity, and realistic weapons.

== Track listing ==
1. "Zehn kleine Jägermeister" (Rohde/Müller, Frege) − 4:21
2. "We Love You" (Jagger/Richards) − 3:10 (The Rolling Stones cover)
3. "Der König aus dem Märchenland" (The king from the fairytale land) (Breitkopf/Frege) − 4:15

== Charts ==
Chart (1996)	Peak position
Austria (Ö3 Austria Top 40)	1
Germany (GfK)	1
Switzerland (Schweizer Hitparade)	1

=== Year-end charts ===
Chart (1996)	Position
Germany (Official German Charts)	12
