= Funny van Dannen =

German songwriter and author (born 1958)

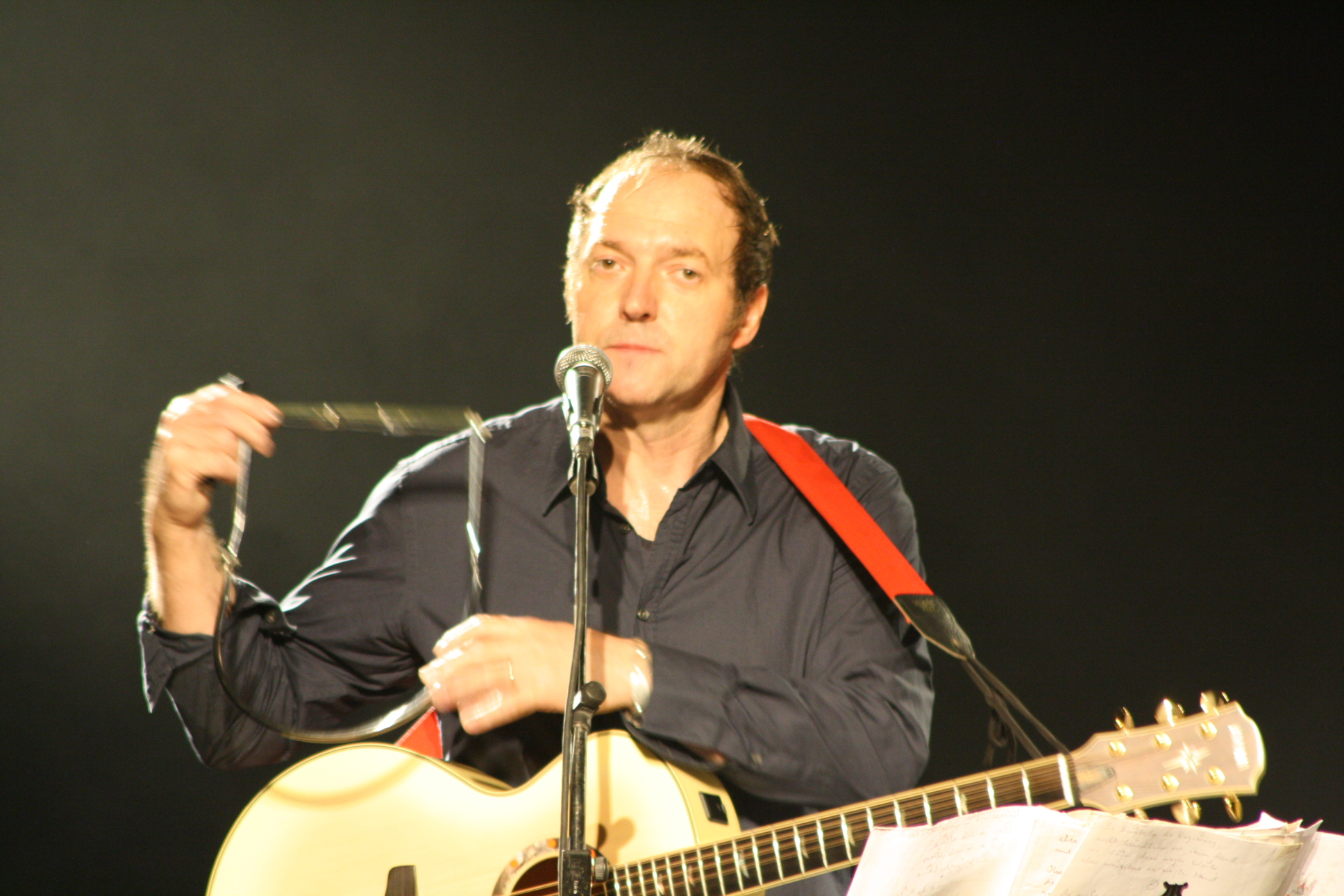
Van Dannen in 2010

Franz-Josef Hagmanns-Dajka (born 1958 in Tüddern, Germany, then under Dutch control), known professionally as Funny van Dannen, is a German singer, songwriter, author, and painter of Dutch origin. Since 1978 Funny Van Dannen has been living in Berlin. He is married and has four sons.

He sings about politics, society, sexuality, religion, and many other topics, usually humorously. He accompanies his songs with guitar, sometimes with harmonica.

Funny Van Dannen, Christiane Rösinger and Almut Klotz founded the German band Lassie Singers in 1988.

Die Schröders, a German punk rock band, made his 1996 song "Saufen" more famous in 1997.

The German punk band Die Toten Hosen interpreted some of his songs, notably Trauriges Arschloch, Bayern (1999), Lesbische, schwarze Behinderte (1999) and Frauen dieser Welt (2002).

== Discography ==
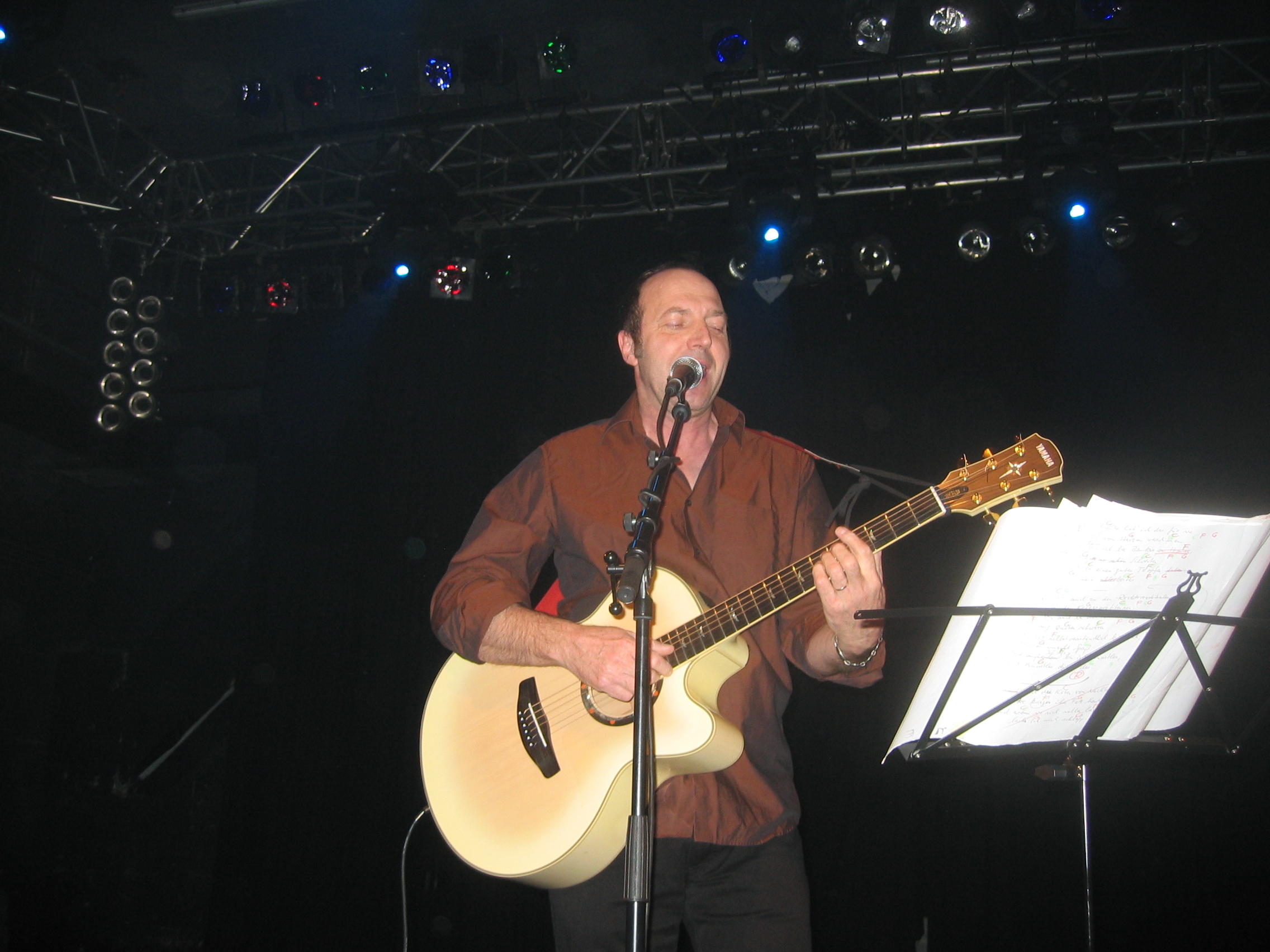
Van Dannen in 2009

- Clubsongs (1995)
- Basics (1996)
- Info3 (1997)
- Uruguay (1999)
- Melody Star (2000)
- Groooveman (2002)
- Herzscheiße (2003)
- Nebelmaschine (2005)
- Authentic Trip (2005)
- Trotzdem danke (2007)
- Saharasand (2009)
- Fischsuppe (2012)
- Geile Welt (2014)
- Come On (Live im Lido) (2016)
- Alles gut, Motherfucker (2018)
- Kolossale Gegenwart (2022)

== Books ==
- Spurt ins Glück (1991)
- Jubel des Lebens (1993)
- Am Wegesrand (1996)
- Komm in meine Arme (1998)
- Der Tag als Rosi kam (1997)
- Neues von Gott (2004)
- Zurück im Paradies, ISBN 9783888974663 (2007)
- An der Grenze zur Realität, ISBN 9783893202034 (2015)
- Die weitreichenden Folgen des Fleischkonsums (2018)
