= 20 Grandes Éxitos (Los Fabulosos Cadillacs album) =

20 Grandes Exitos

Compilation album by Los Fabulosos Cadillacs
- Released: April 28, 1998
- Genre: Rock, ska, reggae
- Length: 84:41
- Label: Sony
- Producer: Los Fabulosos Cadillacs, KC. Porter

Los Fabulosos Cadillacs chronology
Fabulosos Calavera (1997)	20 Grandes Exitos (1998)	La Marcha del Golazo Solitario (1999)

20 Grandes Exitos (English: 20 Big Hits) is the second Compilation album by Argentine rock and ska band Los Fabulosos Cadillacs, released in 1998. It is a two-CDs set covering 8 years and 6 albums plus a never-released song "Igual a Quien"

== Reception ==
The Allmusic review by Stephen Thomas Erlewine awarded the album 4 stars stating "20 Grandes Exitos is an excellent collection of newly-recorded versions of Los Fabulosos Cadillacs' best and best-known songs that should serve as a good introduction for the curious. ".

Professional ratings
Review scores
Source	Rating
Allmusic	4/5 stars

== Track listing ==
=== Disc one ===
No.	Title	Writer(s)	Original Album and Year	Length
1.	"Yo No Me Sentaría En Tu Mesa" (I Would not Sit at Your Table)	Vicentico, Flavio Cianciarulo, Fernando Ricciardi, Sergio Rotman	Yo Te Avise, 1987	2:55
2.	"Mi Novia Se Cayó En Un Pozo Ciego" (My Girlfriend Fell in a Blind Hole)	Vicentico, Cianciarulo, Luciano Giugno, Vaino Rigozzi	Yo Te Avise, 1987	3:54
3.	"Conversación Nocturna" (Night Time Conversation)	Vicentico, Ricciardi, Rigozzi, Mario Siperman	El Ritmo Mundial, 1988	3:34
4.	"Contrabando de Amor" (Smuggling of love)	Vicentico	El Satanico Dr. Cadillac, 1989	3:27
5.	"Caballo de Madera" (Wooden Horse)	Cianciarulo	Volumen 5, 1990	3:15
6.	"Radio Kriminal"	Vicentico, Cianciarulo	Volumen 5, 1990	4:20
7.	"Carnaval Toda la Vida" (Lifelong Carnaval)	Vicentico	El León, 1992	6:07
8.	"Rios De Lágrimas" (Rivers of tears)	Rotman	El León, 1992	2:56
9.	"Arde Buenos Aires" (Buenos Aires Burns)	Cianciarulo	El León, 1992	3:14
10.	"Gallo Rojo" (Red Rooster)	Vicentico	El León, 1992	4:27

=== Disc two ===
No.	Title	Writer(s)	Original Album and Year	Length
1.	"Manuel Santillan, El León (Tumbao)" (Manuel Santillan, The Lion)	Cianciarulo		3:24
2.	"Matador" (Killer)	Vicentico	Vasos Vacíos, 1994	4:34
3.	"Vasos Vacíos (En Vivo)" (Empty Glasses (Live))	Vicentico	El Ritmo Mundial, 1988	4:19
4.	"Mal Bicho" (Bad Bug)	Cianciarulo	Rey Azúcar, 1995	4:04
5.	"Carmela"	Ricciardi	Rey Azúcar, 1995	2:58
6.	"Saco Azul" (Blue Coat)	Vicentico, Valeria Bertuccelli	Rey Azúcar, 1995	3:34
7.	"Las Venas Abiertas De América" (The Open Veins of America)	Cianciarulo	Rey Azúcar, 1995	2:43
8.	"Strawberry Fields Forever"	Lennon–McCartney	Rey Azúcar, 1995	4:17
9.	"Padre Nuestro (Versión Dub)" (Our Father (Dub Version))	Vicentico	Rey Azúcar, 1995	3:37
10.	"Queen Of The Ghetto (Versión Dub)"	Big Youth, Rotman	Rey Azúcar, 1995	5:28
11.	"Mal Bicho (Babasónicos)" (Bad Bug (Babasónicos band))	Cianciarulo		3:56
12.	"Igual A Quien (Inédita)" (Same as Who (Unpublished))	Vicentico		3:38

== Personnel ==
- Vicentico – vocals
- Flavio Cianciarulo – bass
- Anibal Rigozzi – guitar
- Mario Siperman – keyboards
- Fernando Ricciardi – drums
- Naco Goldfinger – tenor saxophone
- Sergio Rotman – alto saxophone
- Daniel Lozano – trumpet & flugelhorn

=== Technical personnel ===
- Bernardo Ernesto Bergeret – producer
- Fabian Couto – art coordinator, director, producer
- Chris Frantz – director, producer
- K.C. Porter – art direction, producer
- Tina Weymouth – director, producer
- Carlos Jorge Yñurrigarro – director, producer
