= Anel Paz =

- Paz performing live

Background information
- Born: José Manuel Paz; November 14, 1963 (age 63); Buenos Aires, Argentina
- Genres: Rock, funk, world music, jazz fusion
- Occupations: Musician, guitarist, composer, record producer, audio engineer, music executive
- Instruments: Guitar, vocals
- Years active: 1989–present
- Labels: PopArt, Sony Music, Géiser Discos

José Manuel "Anel" Paz (born November 14, 1963) is an Argentine musician, guitarist, singer, composer, record producer, and audio engineer. He is known for having been the guitarist of the punk rock band Los Violadores, for founding and leading the multicultural fusion project El General Paz & La Triple Frontera (GP3F), and for his work as a recording engineer and record producer on albums for artists such as Los Fabulosos Cadillacs, Joaquín Sabina, Sandro, Charly García, Turf, Banda de Turistas, Surfistas del Sistema, and Julius Popper.

== Career ==
=== Early career ===
Paz studied music at the Conservatorio Superior de Música Manuel de Falla in Buenos Aires and graduated with honors from the Guitar Institute of Technology (GIT) at the Musicians Institute in Los Angeles, California, in 1988, where he studied with guitarists such as Paul Gilbert, Joe Diorio, Frank Gambale, Scott Henderson, Joe Pass, and Jennifer Batten.

Returning to Argentina in 1989, he participated in establishing and directing the Instituto Tecnológico de Música Contemporánea (ITMC), an institution affiliated with the Musicians Institute in Buenos Aires, serving as director of studies and instructor. That same year, he co-founded the advertising audio production company Raya alongside Ricardo Saúl (later joined by Nicolás Catsoulieris), winning awards including a Silver Clio (1995), a Gold Clio (1996), New York Festivals medals, and the Radio Grand Prix at FIAP.

In 1992, Paz joined Nacha Guevara's project Heavy Tango as arranger and live guitarist, appearing in the music video for "Yira". In 1993, he was recruited by bassist Robert Zelazek to record guitars for the debut album of his project Animal (a group that had kept the original name, leading its counterpart to rebrand as A.N.I.M.A.L.). Paz recorded all the studio material, while the band's live performances were handled by Daniel Telis. The album remained unreleased because, prior to its scheduled release in 1994, the punk band Los Violadores reunited, and Zelazek called upon Paz to join them as their permanent guitarist.

=== Los Violadores (1995–1997) ===
Following this invitation, Paz formally joined Los Violadores in 1995 to replace Gustavo "Stuka" Fossa. With the group, he recorded and co-produced the album Otra patada en los huevos (BMG, 1996) and participated in their reunion shows at the Cemento nightclub and nationwide tours until 1997. Upon his entry into the band, Madhouse (republished by Rock.com.ar) noted his academic background at GIT and described him as "surely the most technically gifted Argentine guitarist" of his generation, while Página/12 reported that Buenos Aires concert reviews highlighted his musicianship.

=== Los Políticos and solo endeavors ===
In 1999, he formed the rock band Los Políticos alongside Fernando Buriasco and Federico Ariztegui, releasing an eponymous studio album that Rolling Stone Argentina selected among the notable independent Argentine releases of 1999.

In March 2001, he was appointed as an international endorser by Ibanez guitars—closely associated with the Ibanez Iceman model—becoming the first Argentine guitarist to be included in the brand's global catalog, appearing in its 2005 edition alongside Steve Vai, Joe Satriani, Paul Gilbert, and Pat Metheny. As part of this work, he conducted technical clinics across several countries, including sessions in Buenos Aires alongside guitarist Marty Friedman (formerly of Megadeth).

=== El General Paz & La Triple Frontera ===
In 2007, Paz founded the multicultural band El General Paz & La Triple Frontera (GP3F), a project focused on fusing rock, funk, jazz, and South American folklore. With the band, he has released five studio productions and toured internationally, performing at events such as South by Southwest (SXSW) in Austin, Texas (2015), the Festival Internacional Cervantino in Guanajuato, and the Polanco Jazz Festival in Mexico City. During the band's tours in Mexico, they also shared the stage with Javier Martín del Campo ("El Javis"), guitarist of the Mexican rock band La Revolución de Emiliano Zapata.

Between 2015 and 2018, Brazilian bassist Arthur Maia joined GP3F as a core band member, performing regularly with the group until his death in December 2018. With Maia in the lineup, the band toured throughout Central America, Mexico, Brazil, and Argentina, performing at festivals and venues such as the San Marcos Festival in Guatemala, Vive Latino in Mexico City (2017), Personal Fest in Buenos Aires (2017), multiple shows at the Bulldog Café in Mexico City, and a live broadcast special for the television show Todas As Bossas on TV Brasil.

=== Audiofuria ===
In 2020, Paz formed the rock project Audiofuria alongside his former Los Violadores bandmate Robert "Polaco" Zelazek (bass) and drummer Walter Martínez (formerly of Almafuerte), with Paz on guitar and vocals. In August 2020, they released their debut single, "Corriendo por la cornisa", recorded earlier with drummer Brian Wilson (of Yngwie Malmsteen's band) and featuring guest backing vocalists from the Argentine rock scene. By October 2021, operating as a quartet following the addition of Julián Alalouf (guitar) and Matías Sabagh (drums), the band released a cover of Los Violadores' "Soy tu jinete" through PopArt.

=== Production, advertising, and label management ===
In 1998, Paz and Fernando Buriasco established the recording studio and independent label Supergaucho Records in Caballito, Buenos Aires—acoustically designed by the Walters-Storyk Design Group—hosting sessions for artists including Joaquín Sabina, Sandro, Charly García, Skay Beilinson, Erreway, and Peruvian rock band Libido.

In April 2003, Paz co-founded the music production house Supercharango alongside Buriasco and Gianni Dusio following the unexpected popularity of "Levanta" ("Levanta pacha mía"), a commercial track for Banco de la Nación Argentina co-written by Paz and Dusio. Widely requested by Argentine schools for civic ceremonies, the CD release exceeded 20,000 copies and was certified Gold. With Supercharango, he won industry distinctions including the 2003 Bureau de Radio award, a Diente de Plata, the Lápiz de Oro (2003), and the Lápiz de Platino for Best Jingle (2007), produced records for acts such as 12 Monos, Sergio Pángaro & Baccarat, and Nerdkids, and gained radio airplay in 2005 with the satirical single "Piqueteros carajou". He also worked on the music production and mixing for the soundtrack of El último Elvis (2012, directed by Armando Bó).

As an audio engineer, Paz worked with Charly García, Los Ratones Paranoicos, and Los Tipitos, as well as on live albums such as Hola and Chau by Los Fabulosos Cadillacs and Nos sobran los motivos by Joaquín Sabina, and studio recordings by Sandro (including Para mamá, Recién ayer, and Secretamente palabras de amor, on which he also contributed as a songwriter).

In 2013, he founded the music production company and recording studio Full Pampa alongside Pablo Turchetti. From this studio, he centralized his production, recording, and mixing work for alternative rock and pop acts, including projects by Turf, Banda de Turistas, Surfistas del Sistema, La Burrita Cumbión, Chilean group Julius Popper, and his own ensemble, El General Paz & La Triple Frontera. Through Full Pampa, he also served as chief audio engineer and mixer for the live television music series Acústicos CMTV (broadcast by Canal de la Música), handling live sessions for artists such as Airbag, Árbol, Attaque 77, Carajo, Estelares, Massacre, Vox Dei, Coti Sorokin, and Sebastián Yatra.

From 2022 to 2025, he worked in Mexico as Country Manager for digital distributor FaroLatino, coordinating catalog development and distribution strategies for alternative acts such as La Barranca, Las Ultrasónicas, Jessy Bulbo, Sergent Garcia, and Los Amantes de Lola. In 2025, he co-founded the independent record label Happy Together Records.

== Selected discography ==
=== As band member ===
Year	Artist	Album	Credited role
1996	Los Violadores	Otra patada en los huevos	Guitar and co-production
1999	Los Políticos	Los Políticos	Guitar, backing vocals, songwriting, and production
2008	El General Paz & La Triple Frontera	El General Paz & La Triple Frontera	Lead vocals, guitar, songwriting, and production
2014	El General Paz & La Triple Frontera	Maravillas	Lead vocals, guitar, songwriting, and production

=== As producer and audio engineer (selection) ===
Year	Artist	Album / Work	Credited role	Record label
2000	Joaquín Sabina	Nos sobran los motivos	Recording engineer	BMG / Ariola
2000	Los Fabulosos Cadillacs	Hola / Chau	Recording engineer	Sony International
2001	Sandro	Para mamá	Recording engineer	Warner Music
2003	Sandro	Recién ayer	Recording engineer	Warner Music
2004	Sandro	Amor gitano	Recording engineer	WEA International
2005	Turf	Para mí, para vos (Reversiones)	Co-producer and recording engineer	PopArt / Pelo Music
2006	Sandro	Secretamente palabras de amor	Recording engineer and songwriter	Universal
2012	Armando Bó	El último Elvis (OST)	Music production, mixing, and mastering	PopArt
2014	Surfistas del Sistema	Modo Despegar	Producer, mixing, and mastering	Géiser Discos
2015–2019	Various artists (Airbag, Attaque 77, Massacre, Sebastián Yatra, Pablo López, Bahiano, Emanero, Estelares, Todo Aparenta Normal, etc.)	Acústicos CMTV (Live TV series)	Sound engineering and mixing	El Canal de la Música (CMTV)
2017	Banda de Turistas	Mancho	Producer and recording engineer (tracks)	Géiser / Sony Music
2019	La Burrita Cumbión	Revolución Francesa	Producer, mixing, and mastering	Géiser / Sony Music
2023	Julius Popper	Relatos falsos de historias verdaderas	Producer, mixing, and mastering	FaroLatino
