= Vasos Vacíos =

Compilation album by Los Fabulosos Cadillacs
- Released: February 15, 1993
- Genres: Rock en español, ska, Latin, reggae, dub
- Length: 1:02:42 (1 hr 2 min 42 sec)
- Labels: Sony Music, Columbia

Los Fabulosos Cadillacs chronology
El León (1992)	Vasos Vacíos (1993)	En Vivo en Buenos Aires (1994)

Vasos Vacíos (Spanish for "Empty Glasses") is the 8th album by Argentine rock, ska, and reggae band Los Fabulosos Cadillacs. This album, released in 1993, was a compilation album which included tracks from the band's previous seven albums (1986–1992). This album also contained new arrangements of previous songs, and new songs such as "El Matador".

This album earned a Gold Album from Argentine Chamber of Phonograms and Videograms Producers (Spanish: Cámara Argentina de Productores de Fonogramas y Videogramas, CAPIF). The Gold Album honor is given when an album sells more than 30,000 units. The band later appeared on the first Latin MTV Unplugged.

== Reception ==
The Allmusic review by Victor W. Valdivia awarded the album 4.5 stars out of 5, stating:

"One of the new tracks, 'El Matador' became an instant smash hit on the newly launched MTV Latino, and deservedly so as the song comes on like a thundering locomotive. The other new track, 'V Centenario' is an assault on colonialism that's almost as forceful. Similarly, the re-recorded earlier hits, such as 'El Satanico Dr. Cadillac' and 'Gitana' are delivered with far more energy and muscle than the original versions. Clearly, by this time, the band had become a more confident and cohesive unit. Vasos Vacios is an excellent introduction to the band's unique style."

Professional ratings
Review scores
Source	Rating
Allmusic	4.5/5 stars

== Track listing ==
No.	Title	Writer(s)	Originally released on	Length
1.	"Cadillacs" (re-recording)	Vicentico, Aníbal Rigozzi, Flavio Cianciarulo	Yo te avisé (1987)	1:34
2.	"El matador"	Cianciarulo	previously unreleased	4:35
3.	"Te tiraré del altar" (re-recording)	Vicentico, Luciano Giugno	El ritmo mundial (1988)	3:07
4.	"V Centenario"	Cianciarulo	previously unreleased	3:54
5.	"Mi novia se cayó en un pozo ciego" (re-recording)	Vicentico, Fernando Ricciardi, Cianciarulo, Giugno	Yo te avisé (1987)	2:39
6.	"El satánico Dr. Cadillac" (re-recording)	Vicentico	El satánico Dr. Cadillac (1989)	4:16
7.	"Gitana" (re-recording)	Cianciarulo	El león (1992)	3:13
8.	"Siguiendo la luna"	Sergio Rotman	El león (1992)	4:59
9.	"Manuel Santillán, el León"	Cianciarulo	El león (1992)	3:57
10.	"Demasiada presión"	Vicentico	Volumen 5 (1990)	4:12
11.	"Vasos vacíos" (featuring Celia Cruz)	Vicentico	El ritmo mundial (1988)	4:37
12.	"Revolution rock"	Jackie Edwards, Danny Ray	El ritmo mundial (1988)	4:59
13.	"Yo no me sentaría en tu mesa"	Vicentico, Ignacio Pardo, Rotman	Yo te avisé (1987)	2:58
14.	"Yo te avisé"	Vicentico	Yo te avisé (1987)	3:09
15.	"El genio del dub"	Vicentico, Ricciardi, Cianciarulo	Yo te avisé (1987)	5:24
16.	"Silencio hospital" (demo)	Vicentico, Mario Siperman	Bares y fondas (1986)	2:07
17.	"Basta de llamarme así"	Vicentico	Bares y fondas (1986)	4:16

== Personnel ==
- Vicentico – Vocals
- Flavio Cianciarulo – bass
- Anibal Rigozzi – Guitar
- Mario Siperman – keyboards
- Fernando Ricciardi – drums
- Sergio Rotman – Alto saxophone
- Daniel Lozano – Trumpet & flugelhorn
- Fernando Albareda – Trombone
- Gerardo Rotblat – percussion

== Sales ==
Region	Certification	Certified units/sales
Argentina	—	310,000
