= La hermandad – en el principio fue el ruido =

Studio album by Die Toten Hosen
- Released: 3 April 2009
- Genres: Punk rock, hardcore punk
- Label: JKP

Die Toten Hosen chronology
| In aller Stille (2008) | La hermandad – en el principio fue el ruido (2009) | Ballast der Republik (2012) |

La hermandad – en el principio fue el ruido (The brotherhood – in the beginning was noise), subtitled En el final fue el silencio (In the end was silence) is a special album by the German punk band Die Toten Hosen for a release in Argentina. It is marketed as an Argentinian version of In aller Stille, although it also contains remixes from Zurück zum Glück. In addition to 9 original songs from In aller Stille and 6 remixes from Zurück zum Glück era there are also 3 new songs, of which 2 feature lyrics in both Spanish and German ("Vida desesperada" and "Viva la muerte") and one is purely in Spanish ("Uno, dos, ultraviolento"), a cover by Los Violadores, the oldest Argentine punk band. The album will also be available in Germany.

A live video was made for "Uno, dos, ultraviolento" in Argentina in El Teatro. The performance was filmed with a finger camera.

== Track listing ==
1. "Strom" (Current) (Frege/Frege) – 2:48 (from In aller Stille)
2. "Weißes Rauschen" (Remix) (White noise) (Meurer/Frege) – 2:07 (from Zurück zum Glück)
3. "Innen alles neu" (Inside All New) (Meurer/Frege) – 2:57 (from In aller Stille)
4. "Disco" (Frege/Frege) – 3:22 (from In aller Stille)
5. "Vida desesperada" (Desperate Life) (Breitkopf/Frege) – 3:11
6. "Ich bin die Sehnsucht in dir" (Remix) (I am the Longing in You) (von Holst/Frege, Weitholz) – 4:03 (from Zurück zum Glück)
7. "Pessimist" (Breitkopf/Frege) – 2:47 (from In aller Stille)
8. "Friss oder stirb" (Remix) (Feed or Die) (von Holst/Frege) – 3:44 (from "Friss oder stirb")
9. "Viva la muerte" (Long Live Death) (Mayer-Poes/Mahler) – 3:59 (Slime cover)
10. "Leben ist tödlich" (Life Is Deadly) (Meurer/Frege) – 3:26 (from In aller Stille)
11. "Goodbye Garageland" (Remix) (Frege, Ritchie, Matt Dangerfield) – 2:23 (from "Friss oder stirb")
12. "The Guns of Brixton" (Remix) (Paul Simonon/Simonon) – 2:57 (The Clash cover; from "Freunde")
13. "Teil von mir" (Part of Me) (von Holst/Frege) – 3:00 (from In aller Stille)
14. "Alles was war" (All That Was) (Breitkopf/Frege) – 3:05 (from In aller Stille)
15. "Die letzte Schlacht" (The Last Battle) (von Holst, Meurer/Frege) – 3:03 (from In aller Stille)
16. "Uno, dos, ultraviolento" (One, Two, ultraviolent) (Stuka/Stuka) – 2:57 (Los Violadores cover)
17. "Freunde" (Remix) (Friends) (Frege, von Holst/Frege) – 4:05 (from Zurück zum Glück)
18. "Angst" (Fear) (von Holst/Frege) – 3:12 (from In aller Stille)

== Personnel ==
- Campino – vocals
- Andreas von Holst (Kuddel) – guitar
- Michael Breitkopf (Breiti) – guitar
- Andreas Meurer (Andi) – bass
- Stephen George Ritchie (Vom) – drums
