= El General Paz & La Triple Frontera =

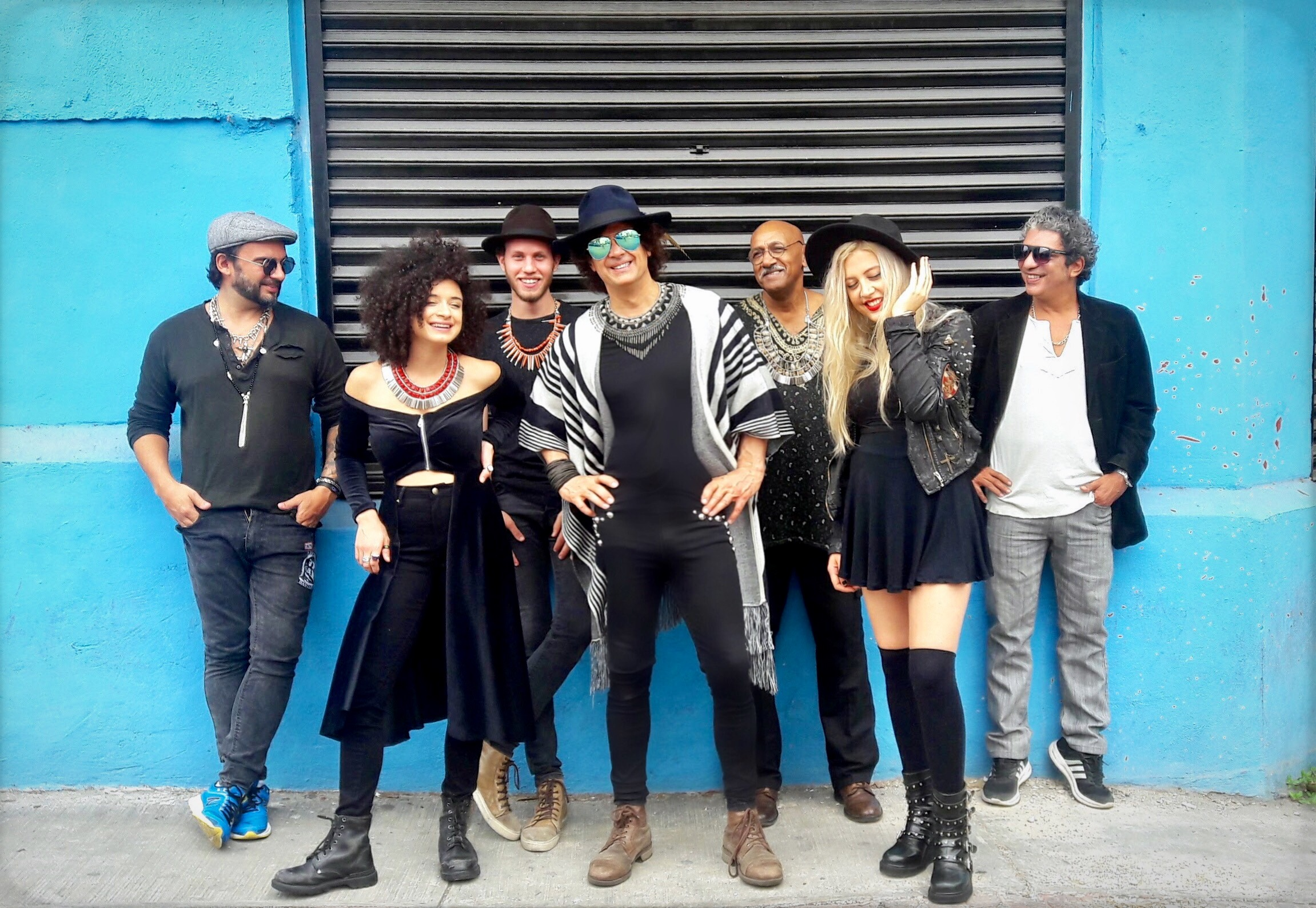
- GP3F performing live

Background information
- Origin: Buenos Aires, Argentina
- Genres: Jazz fusion, funk rock, world music, Latin fusion
- Years active: 2007–present
- Labels: PopArt Discos, Sony Music, Géiser Discos
- Members: Anel Paz (lead vocals, guitar, artistic direction)
- Website: Official Instagram

El General Paz & La Triple Frontera (also known by its acronym GP3F) is a rock fusion ensemble and musical project founded in late 2007 in Buenos Aires by Argentine guitarist, singer, composer, and producer Anel Paz. The band brings together instrumentalists from various countries (Argentina, Brazil, Uruguay, Cuba, and Mexico) and combines funk rock, jazz fusion, and world music with elements of Rioplatense folklore and Afro-Brazilian rhythms.

Throughout its career, the group has released albums through labels such as PopArt Discos, Sony Music, and Géiser Discos, and has toured internationally, performing at events such as South by Southwest (SXSW) in the United States, the Festival Internacional Cervantino, Vive Latino, and the Polanco Jazz Festival in Mexico, as well as special broadcasts for public television networks such as TV Brasil and TV UNAM.

== History ==
=== Formation and debut album (2007–2012) ===
The band emerged in late 2007 under the artistic direction of Anel Paz, following his involvement in groups such as Los Violadores and Los Políticos. In October 2008, they released their eponymous debut album through PopArt Discos, distributed by Sony Music, with an initial lineup featuring Brazilian bassist Kikí Ferreira, Uruguayan percussionist Jorge Platero, and Argentine musicians Diego La Rosa (guitar), Mayra Dómine (keyboards), and César La Rosa (drums). That same month, the band performed as the opening act for Brazilian singer-songwriter Gilberto Gil at the Teatro Gran Rex in Buenos Aires and participated in the Pepsi Music Festival.

During these early years, they established a long-running collaboration with Argentine film and documentary director Rodrigo Espina (known for the film Luca), who directed the music videos for "Carnavalero" (2009) and "Errar es inhumano" (2010), continuing to direct audiovisual works for the group over the following decade.

In January 2010, the group, together with the band Diemen Noord, created the Itinerant World Music Festival (Festival Itinerante de World Music), touring across Patagonia with support from the cultural departments of Chubut, Río Negro, and Neuquén provinces. In April 2011, they opened for guitarist Dominic Miller at the ND Ateneo theater in Buenos Aires and returned to the 2009 and 2011 editions of the Pepsi Music Festival.

=== Maravillas and international touring (2013–2017) ===
In December 2013, they released their second studio album, Maravillas, published by Géiser Discos and Sony Music. The album was officially presented at Samsung Studio in Buenos Aires and reviewed by the Sí! supplement of the Clarín newspaper, which highlighted the stylistic cohesion of its songs within Latin American fusion. For this release, Rodrigo Espina directed the videos for "Alegría", "Luces de cristal", and "Surferos del alma (por el mar)" (2013).

In 2015, the project began a period of international touring, performing at SXSW in Austin, Texas, as well as playing shows in Houston, Dallas, San Antonio, Miami, and Los Angeles (including The Mint). Upon returning to Argentina, they headlined the season 19 premiere of the live television concert series CM Vivo (broadcast by Canal de la Música), a performance later issued as a live recording. During this period, Brazilian bassist and composer Arthur Maia joined as a core collaborator, participating in recordings including the singles "Una flor de lis" (with a music video filmed in Mexico, including Teotihuacan) and "Bella flor" (2016).

Between 2016 and 2017, the band toured Mexico, Guatemala, and Brazil, performing at the Festival Internacional Cervantino (Irapuato), Bulldog Café in Mexico City, Guadalajara, the 2017 Vive Latino festival (opening the Carpa Intolerante stage at Foro Sol), and the Expomusic trade fair in São Paulo. In 2017, they recorded a live television special in Rio de Janeiro for Todas as Bossas on TV Brasil—rebroadcast in December 2023 as a tribute to Arthur Maia—and took part in the summer and year-end editions of Personal Fest in Argentina.

=== Singles, collaborations, and transition (2018–present) ===
In early 2018, they released a version of "Barro tal vez", originally written by Luis Alberto Spinetta, and began recording new material in Rio de Janeiro. Following Arthur Maia's death in December 2018, the group continued recording between Buenos Aires and São Paulo alongside Brazilian pianist and keyboardist Renato Neto, bassist Matías Méndez, and drummer Marcos Kinder, releasing the singles "Maracatu Chegando" (2019), "Un poco perdido" (2019), and "Misteriosa afinidad" (2020), the latter accompanied by a music video directed by Rodrigo Espina and filmed at Teatro de Colegiales and in San Antonio de Areco.

Between 2022 and 2023, the ensemble released a series of collaborations with Latin American acts: "Si no cambio" (with Alejandro Venegas of Chilean band Julius Popper), "Dos millón" (with Mexican band Fanko), "El santuario" (with Javier Martín del Campo "El Javis" of La Revolución de Emiliano Zapata), and "Abres el cielo" (with Surfistas del Sistema). In 2023, they premiered "El santuario" live alongside "El Javis" at the Fiesta de la Música in Zapopan (Guadalajara) and closed the 17th Polanco Jazz Festival at the Teatro Ángela Peralta in Mexico City, featuring Renato Neto on keyboards and Michael Pipoquinha on bass. In January 2024, the group's career was featured in the documentary Borrando fronteras. Iberoamérica en el rock, produced and broadcast by TV UNAM.

== Discography ==
=== Studio albums ===
- 2008: El General Paz & La Triple Frontera (PopArt Discos / Sony Music)
- 2013: Maravillas (Géiser Discos / Sony Music)

=== Live albums and special broadcasts ===
- 2009: Especial CMTV (Live)
- 2015: CMTV Vivo 2015
- 2017: Todas As Bossas (Live on TV Brasil)

=== Selected singles ===
- 2009: "Carnavalero"
- 2010: "Errar es inhumano"
- 2010: "Black Pato"
- 2013: "Alegría"
- 2013: "Luces de cristal"
- 2013: "Surferos del alma (por el mar)"
- 2015: "Una flor de lis" (featuring Arthur Maia)
- 2016: "Bella flor" (featuring Arthur Maia)
- 2018: "Barro tal vez"
- 2019: "Maracatu Chegando"
- 2019: "Un poco perdido"
- 2020: "Misteriosa afinidad"
- 2022: "Dos millón" (featuring Fanko)
- 2022: "Si no cambio" (featuring Julius Popper)
- 2023: "El santuario" (featuring La Revolución de Emiliano Zapata)
- 2023: "Abres el cielo" (featuring Surfistas del Sistema)
