= La Marcha del Golazo Solitario =

La Marcha Del Golazo Solitario

Studio album by Los Fabulosos Cadillacs
- Released: 1999
- Genre: Rock en español, ska, Latin, reggae, jazz
- Length: 56:32
- Label: BMG, Ariola
- Producer: K.C. Porter

Los Fabulosos Cadillacs chronology
Fabulosos Calavera (1997)	La Marcha Del Golazo Solitario (1999)	Hola/Chau (2001)

La Marcha del Golazo Solitario (Spanish for The March of The Lonely Huge Goal) Released in 1999 is the ninth studio album from the Argentine Ska Reggae Latin Rock band Los Fabulosos Cadillacs to reach gold.

This is the last studio album from the band before taking a nine year hiatus. Among the singles were the commercially successful "La Vida" and "Vos Sabés", whose video was censured in some countries for showing nudes. "Los Condenaditos" combines samba beats with bluesy slide guitar and a wall of horns. There's even an instrumental Latin-jazz number, "57 Almas".

== Reception ==
The Allmusic review by Victor W. Valdivia awarded the album 2.5 stars stating "The thrash metal guitars and wild tempo changes have been abandoned for a jazzy, Brazilian feel. "C.J." is a straight bossa nova track... while "Los Condenaditos" marries samba beats to bluesy slide guitar and a wall of horns. Lyrically, the band has toned down the quirky humor as well, preferring to write songs that are more reflective and philosophical, although there is still plenty of smart-ass humor to be found... Though Marcha is a frequently enjoyable listen, one can't help but feel that it's a bit of a step back (or at least sideways) after the peaks of their previous two albums, both of which would ultimately serve as better introductions to the Fabulosos Cadillacs".

Professional ratings
Review scores
Source	Rating
Allmusic	2.5/5 stars

== Track listing ==
1. "La Vida" ("The Life") (Flavio Cianciarulo) – 2:52
2. "C.J." (Vicentico) – 3:49
3. "Los Condenaditos" ("The Little Damned") (Vicentico, Gerardo Rotblat) – 5:08
4. "Cebolla, El Nadador" ("Onion, The Swimmer") (Vicentico) – 4:26
5. "Vos Sabés" ("You Know") (Cianciarulo) – 3:09
6. "Piraña, Todos los Argentinos Somos D.T." ("Piranha, All of Us Argentines are Coaches") (Cianciarulo) – 3:03
7. "El Baile de la Mar" ("The Dance of the Sea") (Fernando Ricciardi) – 3:25
8. "Roble" ("Oak") (Vicentico) – 3:08
9. "La Rosca" ("The Thread") (Vicentico, Pablo Ziegler) – 4:28
10. "La Marcha del Golazo Solitario" ("The March of the Solitary Great Goal") (Cianciarulo, Angelo Moore, Norwood Fisher, Walter Kibby) – "Rhythm-A-Ning" (Thelonious Monk) – 5:06
11. "Águila" ("Eagle") (Vicentico) – 3:22
12. "Salvador y los Cordones Flojos" ("Salvador and the Loose Shoelaces") (Cianciarulo) – 2:53
13. "Necesito una Nariz de Payaso, ¿No Me Prestás la Tuya?" ("I Need a Clown Nose, Can I Borrow Yours?") (Cianciarulo) – 3:10
14. "Negra" ("Black") (Cianciarulo, Rotblat) – 1:57
15. "57 Almas" ("57 Souls") (Cianciarulo) – 5:11
16. "Álamo" ("Poplar") (Vicentico) – 1:25
17. "Porque Yo Te Amo" ("Because I Love You") (Oscar Anderle, Sandro) – 4:26 Additional track on reissue

== Personnel ==
- Vicentico – vocals, piano on "Álamo" and "La Rosca"
- Flavio Cianciarulo – bass
- Ariel Minimal – guitar
- Mario Siperman – keyboards
- Fernando Ricciardi – drums
- Daniel Lozano – trumpet & flugelhorn
- Fernando Albareda – trombone
- Gerardo Rotblat – percussion
- Sergio Rotman – saxophone

=== Additional Personnel ===
- Pablo Ziegler – Piano on "57 Almas"
- David Campbell – String arrangements, orchestration and conducting on "Águila"
