= El Arte de la Elegancia de LFC =

Album by Los Fabulosos Cadillacs

Studio album by Los Fabulosos Cadillacs
- Released: November 3, 2009
- Recorded: May 2009
- Genre: Ska, cumbia
- Length: 63:57
- Label: Sony Music
- Producer: Rafa Vila

Los Fabulosos Cadillacs chronology
La Luz del Ritmo	El Arte de la Elegancia de LFC	La Salvación De Solo Y Juan

El Arte de la Elegancia de LFC (The Art of Elegance of LFC) (2009) is the sixteenth album by Argentine ska band Los Fabulosos Cadillacs.

In a similar manner of the previous one, the album is mostly composed of re-makes of some classic songs with only 3 new songs, amongst them a cover.

== Reception ==
The Allmusic review by Pemberton Roach awarded the album 3 stars stating "The album features re-recorded versions of older songs, a couple of brand new tunes. Vintage tunes such as "El Sonido Joven de America" and "Contrabando de Amor," in particular, benefit from fuller production and more relaxed ensemble playing—in both cases the manic ska-punk energy is toned down a bit, but the new approach gives the tracks a more solid, danceable vibe... While perhaps not as essential a release as many of the group's older albums, El Arte de La Elegancia de LFC was a welcome return to form".

Professional ratings
Review scores
Source	Rating
Allmusic	3/5 stars

== Track listing ==
1. "Contrabando de Amor" _{("Smuggling of love")} (Vicentico) – 2:56
2. "Siempre Me Hablaste de Ella" _{("You Always Talked to me About Her")} (Flavio Cianciarulo) – 2:36
3. "Vamos Ya! (Move on Up)" (Curtis Mayfield) – 2:45
4. "C.J." (Vicentico) – 4:42
5. "El Sonido Joven de America" _{("The Young Sound of America")} (Cianciarulo) – 2:17
6. "Lanzallamas" _{("Flamethrower)} (Cianciarulo) – 2:23
7. "Tanto Como un Dios" _{("As Much as a God")} (Vicentico) – 3:43
8. "Surfer Calavera" _{(Skull Surfer)} (Cianciarulo) – 3:03
9. "Siete Jinetes" _{(Seven Raiders)} (Cianciarulo) – 3:12
10. "Soledad" _{(Loneliness)} (Cianciarulo) – 2:39
11. "Mas Solo Que La Noche Anterior" _{("Lonelier than Last Night")} (Vicentico, Cianciarulo) – 5:41

== Personnel ==
- Vicentico – vocals
- Flavio Cianciarulo – bass
- Sergio Rotman – sax
- Mario Siperman – keyboard
- Fernando Ricciardi – drums
- Daniel Lozano – trumpet
