= Matador (Los Fabulosos Cadillacs song) =

Song by Los Fabulosos Cadillacs

"El matador"

Song by Los Fabulosos Cadillacs

from the album Vasos Vacíos
- Released: February 15, 1994 (CD)
- Recorded: August 1993 in A&M Studios, Los Angeles, California
- Genre: Candombe • Latin rock
- Length: 4:33
- Label: Sony Music
- Songwriter: Flavio Cianciarulo
- Producer: K. C. Porter

"Matador" or "El matador" (Spanish for "Killer") is a song written by Flavio Cianciarulo, bass player of Los Fabulosos Cadillacs, a rock band from Argentina. It was first released in their 1993 album Vasos Vacíos and it is considered their signature song since the song topped the charts all across Hispanic America.

Alongside "Mal Bicho", "Manuel Santillan, El León" and "Desapariciones" (a cover of Rubén Blades' song), "El Matador" is one of the Cadillacs' several thematic songs about the oppression and forced disappearances during the years of military dictatorship across the Southern Cone, particularly Argentina's last civil-military dictatorship (1976–1983). The song narrates the story of a revolutionary (known as "El Matador") who is being hunted down by pro-dictatorship law enforcement agents, and the narrative is told from the revolutionary's POV. The song also references Víctor Jara, a Chilean folksinger and supporter of the Allende government who was kidnapped, tortured and assassinated shortly after the Chilean coup of 1973 by military officials loyal to the dictator Augusto Pinochet.

Musically, the song mixes elements of Latin rock and ska with candombe, an Afro-Argentine and Afro-Uruguayan style of music popular in the Río de la Plata. It also incorporates elements of Buenos Aires-style murga.

== In popular culture ==
This song is played when Nicaraguan boxer Ricardo "El Matador" Mayorga walks to the ring.

"El Matador" was the intro song for #1 tennis player in the world Rafael Nadal in the 2010 US Open Night Sessions.

This song is part of the soundtrack of the movie The Matador. It also appeared in the movie Grosse Pointe Blank, as well as its soundtrack.

The University of Southern California's "Spirit of Troy" Marching Band, always played "El Matador" when their USC Trojans football quarterback Mark Sanchez entered the field.

The song "Single-Bilingual" by British duo Pet Shop Boys features a sample throughout the entire length of their song.
