= La Luz del Ritmo =

Studio album by Los Fabulosos Cadillacs
- Released: October 30, 2008
- Genre: Rock en español, ska, Latin, experimental
- Length: 61:56
- Label: Sony Music
- Producer: Los Fabulosos Cadillacs

Los Fabulosos Cadillacs chronology
Hola/Chau (2001)	La Luz del Ritmo (2008)	El Arte De La Elegancia De LFC (2009)

La Luz del Ritmo ("The Light of Rhythm") is the fifteenth album by Argentine ska band Los Fabulosos Cadillacs. After a 7-year-long hiatus of the group in which some of the members of the band spent some time in their own projects, Los Fabulosos Cadillacs regrouped to launch a very anticipated disc which includes 5 new songs, 6 remakes and 2 covers, all new versions.

The most important single was the new version of Padre Nuestro, with a very different Cumbia tone, and a video that set the theme for the new style and the new album.

The title track is featured in football video game by EA Sports, FIFA 10.

== Reception ==
The AllMusic review by Mariano Prunes awarded the album 3 stars stating "Their vastly improved musicianship is very much on display here, particularly in the new versions of very early songs such as "Basta de Llamarme Así" or "El Genio del Dub," but it's not enough to make up for the lack of inspiration in the new material and the covers. The new songs are all correct LFC tunes but, with the possible exception of Rotman's jaunty "El Fin del Amor," hardly memorable, and a bit too much on the auto celebratory side for a band usually concerned with more pressing matters. All in all, La Luz del Ritmo is a decent comeback card, but still remains the least essential of all the Los Fabulosos Cadillacs' releases".

Professional ratings
Review scores
Source	Rating
AllMusic	3/5 stars

== Track listing ==
1. "La luz del ritmo" ("The Light of Rhythm") (Flavio Cianciarulo) – 4:05
2. "Mal bicho"("Bad Bug") (Flavio Cianciarulo) – 3:51
3. "Flores" ("Flowers") (Flavio Cianciarulo) – 3:54
4. "Padre nuestro" ("Our Father") (Vicentico) – 4:34
5. "Nosotros egoístas" ("We the Selfish Ones") (Flavio Cianciarulo) – 3:42
6. "Hoy" ("Today") (Vicentico) – 4:23
7. "Should I Stay or Should I Go" (Joe Strummer / Mick Jones) – 2:58
8. "El genio del dub" ("The Geine of Dub") (Sergio Rotman - Fernando Ricciardi – Flavio Cianciarulo – Vicentico) – 4:37
9. "Basta de llamarme así" ("Stop Calling Me That") (Vicentico) – 4:16
10. "El fin del amor" ("The End of Love") (Sergio Rotman) – 2:11
11. "Muy, muy temprano" ("Too, Too Soon") (Vicentico - Flavio Cianciarulo) – 5:07
12. "Wake Up and Make Love with Me" (Ian Dury - Chas Jankel) – 5:34
13. "Condenaditos" ("Damned Little Ones") (Vicentico – Gerardo Rotblat) – 5:11

== Personnel ==
- Vicentico – vocals
- Flavio Cianciarulo – bass
- Sergio Rotman – sax
- Mario Siperman – keyboard
- Fernando Ricciardi – drums
- Daniel Lozano – trumpet

== Sales and certifications ==
Region	Certification	Certified units/sales
Argentina (CAPIF)	Platinum	40,000^{^}
^{^} Shipments figures based on certification alone.
