= Pil Trafa =

Argentine composer and singer (1959–2021)

Pil Trafa Enrique Héctor Chalar
- Also known as: Pil Trafa
- Born: February 1, 1959 Buenos Aires
- Origin: Buenos Aires, Argentina
- Died: August 13, 2021 (aged 62). Lima
- Genres: Punk rock, hard rock
- Occupation(s): Singer, composer
- Instrument: Voice
- Years active: 1980–2021

Enrique Héctor Chalar (February 1, 1959 in Buenos Aires – August 13, 2021 in Lima), better known as Pil Trafa, was an Argentine composer and singer. He is regarded as the pioneer of punk in Spanish in Latin America, with his band Los Violadores.

== Biography ==
Chalar began his musical career in the early 1980s, when he formed Los Violadores ("The Violators", referring to breaking the law, as mentioned in one of their songs, "Violadores de la Ley"); with Gustavo Fossá (Stuka) on electric guitar, Sergio Gramática on drums and Robert "Polish" Zelazek on bass. This 1983–1991 lineup released six studio albums, influencing British punk bands like Sex Pistols, the Clash, the Damned, the Jam and Buzzcocks. Among the best known songs of the band are: "Represión", "Uno, dos ultraviolento", "Más allá del bien, más allá del mal", "Fuera de sektor", "Violadores de la ley" and "Comunicado 166".

With several lineup changes, Pil Trafa was the only permanent member until the final separation in 2011.

In 1992, at the first separation of Los Violadores, Pil Trafa formed Pilsen, a group that only released two albums between 1993 and 1994, and would have production of former Sex Pistols guitarist Steve Jones and Ronald Biggs, the famous "train robber". This band broke up in 1995.

In 1999, together with Stuka he formed the duo Stku@Pil, edited a Homonym album and separated in 2000.

In 2004, he released his first solo album, entitled El monopolio de las palabras (in English: The monopoly of the words) and their first single was a cover of Manu Chao, Clandestino.

In 2015, he released his second solo album with his new band "Los Violadores de la Ley", entitled Último hombre, material produced by Steve Diggle, Buzzcocks bassist.

Since the 1990s, Pil Trafa had relocated to Lima, Peru, where he lived with Peruvian producer Claudia Huerta and his son Ian.

On August 13, 2021, at age 62, Pil Trafa died after suffering cardiac arrest at his home in Lima. The official statement released by Pilsen reads: "A warrior has passed away, a pioneer of Latin American punk and underground, enlightened lyricist, spokesman for a whole generation, fighter and tireless captain of a thousand battles".

== Discography ==
=== Los Violadores ===
- 1983 – Los Violadores
- 1985 – ¿Y ahora qué pasa, eh?
- 1986 – Uno, dos, ultravioladores
- 1986 – Fuera de Sektor
- 1987 – Mercado indio
- 1989 – Y que Dios nos perdone...
- 1991 – Otro festival de la exageración
- 1996 – Otra patada en los huevos
- 2004 – Y va... sangrando
- 2006 – Bajo un sol feliz
- 2009 – Rey o reina

=== Live albums ===
- 1990 – En vivo y ruidoso
- 1996 – Histórico (La verdadera historia) 2 CD
- 2003 – En vivo y ruidoso II

=== Pilsen ===
- 1993 – Bajo otra bandera
- 1994 – Bestiario

=== Soloist ===
- 2004 – El monopolio de las palabras
- 2015 – Último hombre

== See also ==
- Argentine rock § New Democracy Sound
