= Pilsen (band) =

- Origin: Buenos Aires, Argentina
- Genres: Punk rock
- Years active: 1992–1995
- Labels: Sony
- Past members: Pil Trafa; Tucan Barauskas; Biko; Sergio Vall; Alejo ABChe

Pilsen was a punk band from Argentina. It was founded by Pil Trafa, after separation of Los Violadores in 1992.

== History ==
The group was formed in late 1992, when "Pil Trafa", decided to return to Argentina after having been in Lima, Peru; in order to continue their career with a multinational record label.

In January 1993, the group recorded two songs in the Synth studies of Rio de Janeiro, Brazil, along with Ronald Biggs, the historic "train robber", who worked with the Sex Pistols and edited Bajo otra bandera. During that period, they wrote and composed songs with Campino, leader of the German punk band, Die Toten Hosen and with Steve Jones, former guitarist of the Sex Pistols.

In 1994, most of its members left the band, leaving "Pil Trafa" as the only permanent member. With another formation, they edited the second album, Bestiario; but because it did not sell as well as expected, the group broke up in 1995.

The best known songs of the band are "Pilsen" (with Ronnie Biggs), "Bajo otra bandera", "Iván fue un comunista", "Pogo en el ascensor" and "Va por mi, va por vos".

== Discography ==
- Bajo otra bandera (Sony BMG, 1993)
- Bestiario (Sony BMG, 1994)
