= Interama =

Argentine rock band

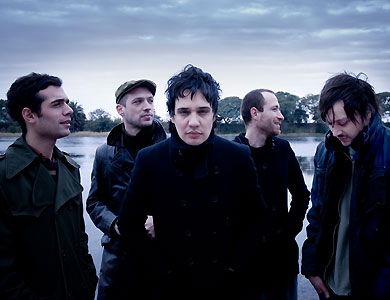
Interama, 2007. L to R: Franco Italiano, Sebastián Pinardi, Sebastián Salvador, Ayar Sava, Luciano Mazer.

Interama is an Argentine rock band, formed in 1999, in Ituzaingó, Buenos Aires, Argentina although the present members are together since 2001. In 2007, drummer Mario Guzzi was replaced by Franco Italiano. The band was the result of the union of Electra and Limón, which had played during years in the underground circuit.

“From that cohesion Interama arose, in order to improve and to grow artistic carrying out a proposal where to aim at the emotions it was going to be important part of the objective”, they remember.

The style of Interama approaches pop and alternative rock, where the resources vary according to climates, and the letters are strong sensations of existentialism and rhetorical questions. They are influenced by many artists, some of which are The Beatles, Pink Floyd, Radiohead, David Bowie, and Argentina's Luis Alberto Spinetta, Charly Garcia, and Soda Stereo.

Their first album “Polución electrónica de las conciencias” (2000), is more dedicated to the sonorous experimentation, and “En la Esfera”, gets more direct sound.

By 2003 they started a more serious career, releasing "El jardín que florece sin cesar", their first LP, edited by Nadar Solo Discos. This LP had good press critics and allowed Interama to get other horizons. The songs in this record has a fresh humour and a hopefully point of view. Examples: "Hablando con el espejo", "Alto", "Espiritu de caleidoscopio". After this, Interama begun to play in more important circuits in Buenos Aires and other cities, like Mendoza, Cordoba and Mar del Plata.

"Iniciando la máquina de ángeles" (2005, second LP) stepped in a more conceptual view, with a bit epic and progressive attitude. Some people found it more dense than "El jardín..." The sound got better than the first LP, and the songs got longer. Examples: "Nueva York", "Estremecimiento", "Parques en el aire".

They have 3 videos in MTV's rotation, and several critics in Rolling Stone, Inrockuptibles, etc. They played at Personal Fest 2004 (featuring Mars Volta, PJ Harvey, Primal Scream and Pet Shop Boys), BUE Festival 2005 (with The Strokes and Kings of Leon) and made the opening act for Placebo's first visit, on April 4, 2005, at Luna Park Stadium, Buenos Aires, Argentina. In 2006, they played again in BUE Festival, this time sharing screen with Beastie Boys, Patti Smith, Daft Punk, TV on the Radio, Elefant and many others. They also were part of "La Fiesta de la X", a big event made at Batlle Park, Montevideo, Uruguay, on November 11, 2006.

In August, 2007, they opened the Dolores O'Riordan's show at Gran Rex Theatre in Buenos Aires.

Resiste (Resist), their September 2007 release, is the 3rd LP in the Interama's career, with 13 brand new songs. Resumes the path made with both EJQFSC and ILMDA, creating a more nervous and rocker atmosphere with the production of Mariano Esaín. A step forward not forgetting the works done before. Examples: "Julia Vive En Una Película", "Resiste", "Telaraña".

In 2009, while preparing the 4th album, Ayar Sava left the band and was unreplaced, keeping Interama as a quartet. Beginning 2010, Interama recorded and mixed all the songs for the 4th album, mainly written in collaboration between all four members. By mid-2010 and with the fourth album finished but not released, Interama entered in hiatus. Sebastian Salvador started a solo career and Sebastian Pinardi, Luciano Mazer and Franco Italiano joined Suami with other musicians, being this a radically different project from Interama.

On January 13, 2011, and being already in hiatus, Interama released the fourth album: "Fin del circulo imperfecto" (End of an Imperfect Circle), co-produced with Leo Ghernetti. This work had more freedom than the previous ones, being the song "Simple, como el viento que todo lo arrastra hacia el sol que todo lo consume", with more than 13 minutes long, an example of cohesion and absence of structures. The record is only available online on Bandcamp and Taringa.

== Band members ==
- Sebastian Salvador (voice, acoustic guitar, piano)
- Sebastian Pinardi (bass, voice)
- Luciano Mazer (electric guitar, voice)
- Franco Italiano (drums, percussion)

== Former members ==
- Ayar Sava (electric and synthesized guitars) 1999-2009
- Mario Guzzi (drums, percussion) 2001-2007
- Hernan Doño (drums, percussion) 1999
- Fernando Barroetaveña (guitar) 1999
- Gerardo De Petrini (drums) 2000
- Tomas Pochat (drums) 2000

== Discography ==
- Polución electrónica de las conciencias (2000) EP (discontinued)
- En la esfera (2001) EP (discontinued)
- El Jardín Que Florece Sin Cesar (2003) LP (available at LabelRecord.com *)
- Iniciando La Maquina De Angeles (2005) LP (available at LabelRecord.com *)
- Resiste (2007) LP (available at LabelRecord.com *)
- Fin del circulo imperfecto (2011) LP (available at Bandcamp.com *)
