= Arthur Maia =

Brazilian composer and musician (1962–2018)

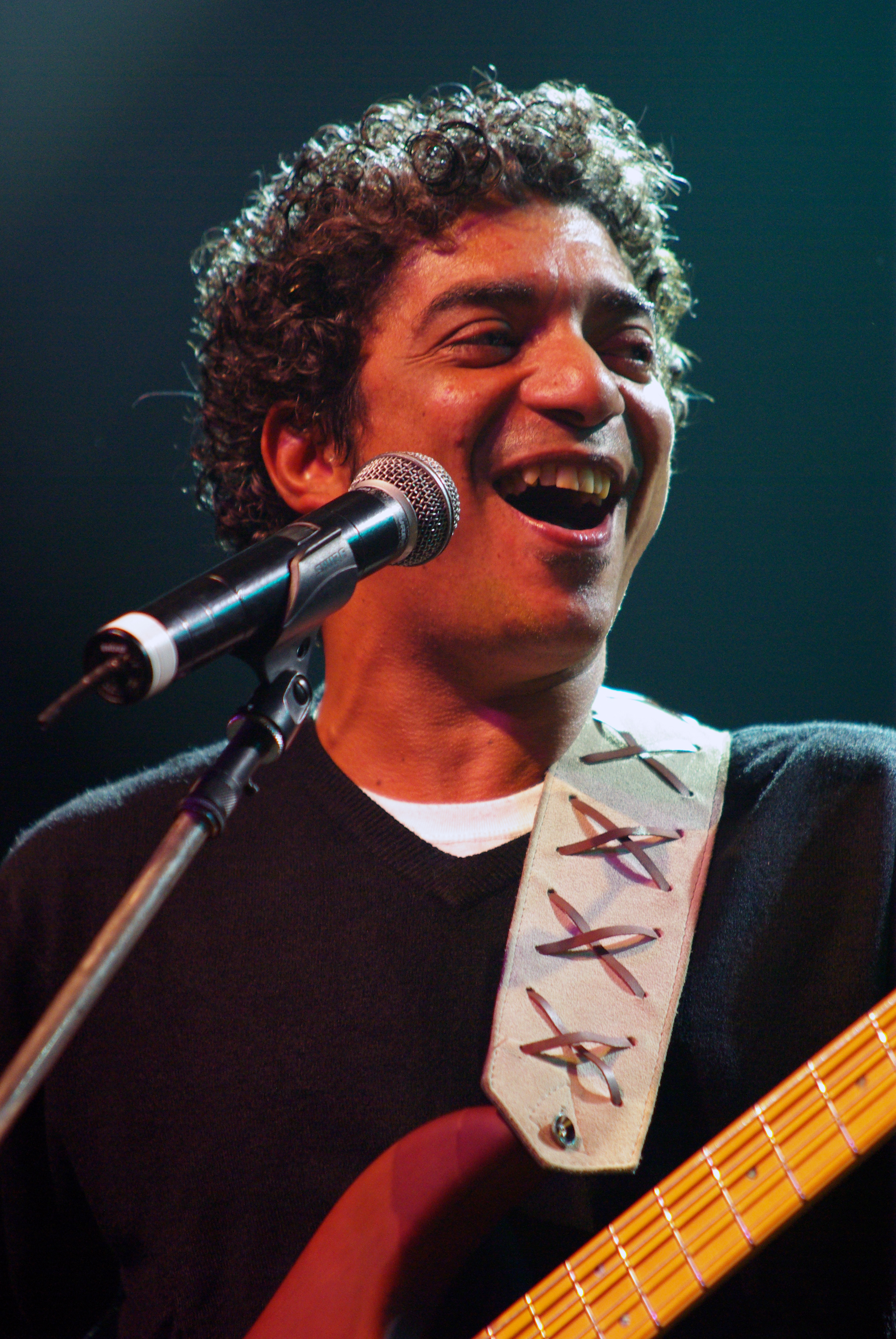
- A portrait of Arthur Maia

Background information
- Born: 9 April 1962; Rio de Janeiro, Brazil
- Died: 15 December 2018 (aged 56)
- Genres: Jazz, samba, funk, reggae
- Occupation(s): Musician, composer, producer
- Instrument: Bass
- Years active: 1980–2018
- Formerly of: Cama de Gato

Arthur Maia (9 April 1962 – 15 December 2018) was a Brazilian composer and musician. Maia played with musicians such as Djavan, Gilberto Gil, Marisa Monte, Lulu Santos and Ney Matogrosso. His compositions usually present a fusion of jazz, funk, swing music and reggae.

== Biography ==
Arthur Maia started his musical studies playing drums, when he was still a child. When he was 15 years old, he received a bass as a gift and, influenced by his uncle Luizão Maia, a Brazilian bass player, began to practice it. Later he became a professional bass player, playing with many famous Brazilian artists, such as Ivan Lins, Luiz Melodia and Márcio Montarroyos.

In 1985, he joined the band Cama de Gato, a Brazilian jazz group formed by Rique Pantoja (piano), Pascoal Meirelles (drums), Mauro Senise (saxophone) and Maia (bass). With it, he recorded five albums. Although Maia was no longer a member of the band, he was a special guest on Cama de Gato's sixth album. He also joined many other instrumental music bands, such as Pulsar, Banda Black Rio and Egotrip; their songs were much played on Brazilian radio in the 1980s. In 2015 Maia joined the band El General Paz & La Triple Frontera (GP3F), a multicultural fusion band integrated by musicians from various countries. In 1986, Maia also recorded an album dedicated to Tom Jobim and Heitor Villa-Lobos with Gilson Peranzzetta: Tom & Villa.

During his career, Maia developed his own style of playing bass, mastering bass techniques and mixing several rhythms. His style made him famous and many artists invited him to record with them. In Brazil, he played with Jorge Benjor, Gal Costa, Lulu Santos, Caetano Veloso, Roberto Carlos, Martinho da Vila, Djavan, Milton Nascimento, Marisa Monte, Fernanda Froes Pruett, Leila Pinheiro and César Camargo Mariano; abroad, with Ernie Watts, Sheila E., Pat Metheny, Carlos Santana, George Benson, Paquito de Rivera and Plácido Domingo. Maia also played in many festivals around the world, such as Free Jazz Festival, Heineken Concerts, Paris Jazz Festival, Montreaux Jazz Festival etc.

In 1990, Maia recorded his first solo album, which won the Prêmio Sharp award one year later. In 1996, he recorded his second album, which was very well received by critics, and in 2002 recorded Planeta música, with the participation of many famous musicians, such as Dennis Chambers and Mike Stern.

In 2005, Maia organized a tribute to his uncle, who had died that year. The show was staged at the Mistura Fina Pub, Rio de Janeiro, with the participation of the Brazilian singer Leny Andrade.

Maia died from cardiac arrest on December 15, 2018.

== Discography ==
=== As leader ===
- Tom & Villa (Pan Produções, 1986) with Gilson Peranzzetta
- Maia (Som da Gente, 1990)
- Arthur Maia (Paradoxx Music, 1996),
- Black Fusion Band ao vivo (Niterói Discos, 2000) with Hiram Bullock
- Planeta música (Cabeçadura Records, 2002)
- O Tempo e a Música (Biscoito Fino, 2010)

=== With Cama de Gato ===
- Cama de Gato (Som da Gente, 1986)
- Guerra fria (Som da Gente, 1988)
- Sambaíba (Som da Gente, 1990)
- Dança da lua (Som da Gente, 1993)
- Amendoim torrado (Albatroz, 1995)
