= En Vivo en Buenos Aires =

En vivo en Buenos Aires

Live album by Los Fabulosos Cadillacs
- Released: 1994
- Genres: Rock en español, ska, Latin, reggae, dub
- Length: 45:42
- Labels: Sony Music, Columbia

Los Fabulosos Cadillacs chronology
Vasos Vacíos (1993)	En vivo en Buenos Aires (1994)	Rey Azúcar (1995)

En Vivo en Buenos Aires (Spanish for Live in Buenos Aires) Released in 1994 is the ninth album and first live one from the Argentine ska reggae Latin rock band Los Fabulosos Cadillacs. It was well received and earned a gold disc.

Recorded in the Arena Obras Sanitarias following the huge success of Vasos Vacios. The album shows a young Cadillacs which put a lot of strength in the songs, mixing them with parts of other songs (like "Desapariciones" that is mixed with "Rio Manzanares" both of Ruben Blades) or with Vicentico putting strong vocal parts in a few songs like "Siguiendo la Luna".

== Track listing ==
1. "Intro - No acabes" ("Intro - Don't cum") (Arnedo, Luca Prodan, Troglio) – 1:47
2. "Mi novia se cayó en un pozo ciego" ("My girlfriend fell in a cesspool") (Vicentico, Giugno, Rigozzi) – 2:36
3. "El aguijón" ("The Sting") (Vicentico) – 3:54
4. "Vasos vacíos" ("Empty Glasses") (Vicentico) – 4:19
5. "Desapariciones" ("Disappearances") (Ruben Blades) – 7:42
6. "Manuel Santillán, el León" ("Manuel Santillan, The Lion") (Flavio Cianciarulo) – 5:03
7. "Siguiendo la Luna" ("Following the Moon") (Sergio Rotman) – 8:57
8. "Guns of Brixton" (Paul Simonon) – 4:17
9. "You're Wondering Now" (Seymour) – 2:51
10. "Gallo rojo" ("Red Rooster") (Vicentico) – 4:30

== Personnel ==
- Vicentico – vocals
- Flavio Cianciarulo – bass
- Anibal Rigozzi – guitar
- Mario Siperman – keyboards
- Fernando Ricciardi – drums
- Sergio Rotman – alto saxophone
- Daniel Lozano – trumpet & flugelhorn
- Fernando Albareda – trombone
- Gerardo Rotblat – percussion
