= Arthur Maia (album) =

Studio album by Arthur Maia
- Released: 1996
- Genre: Instrumental music, funk, jazz
- Length: 63:02
- Label: Paradoxx Music
- Producer: Arthur Maia, Carla Poppovic, Marcelo Martins

Arthur Maia is the second solo album recorded by Brazilian bassist Arthur Maia. The album is also known as Sonora.

Maia toured Europe and Japan in support of the album. He also played the Town Hall, New York, during the Brazil-New York Jazz Festival.

== Track listing ==
#	Title	Songwriters	Length
1.	"Sonora"	Arthur Maia	5:11
2.	"Arthur e o gigante"	William Magalhães	5:08
3.	"Alpha"	Arthur Maia	5:36
4.	"13"	Arthur Maia	7:41
5.	"B12"	Arthur Maia	1:24
6.	"Boa nova"	Arthur Maia, Heitor TP	5:08
7.	"Grooveland"	Paulo Braga	6:05
8.	"Filhos"	Renato Rocket	4:45
9.	"Cruzado"	Arthur Maia	4:36
10.	"Pé quente"	Marcelo Martins	4:18
11.	"Cabeça de nêgo"	Arthur Maia, Claudio Zolli	4:27
12.	"Katmanrururói"	Arthur Maia	1:27
13.	"Miles"	Arthur Maia	2:42
14.	"Nirvana com Nescau"	Arthur Maia	3:17
15.	"Besteira"	Luizão Maia	1:10

== Personnel ==
- Arthur Maia – vocals, electric bass, drums (in "Filhos") and percussion (in "Besteira")
- John Patitucci – bass (in "Pé quente")
- Fernando Caneca – electric guitar (in "Sonora" and "Pé quente")
- Heitor TP – electric guitar (in "Boa nova")
- Claudio Zolli – electric guitar (in "Grooveland" and "Cabeça de nêgo")
- Paulinho Guitarra – electric guitar (in "Grooveland")
- Paulo "Mou" Brasil – electric guitar (in "Filhos")
- Ricardo Silveira – electric guitar (in "Cruzado")
- Celso Fonseca – acoustic guitar (in "Alpha" and electric guitar (in "Nirvana com Nescau")
- Djavan – acoustic guitar (in "13")
- Gilson Peranzetta – accordion (in "Sonora")
- William Magalhães – keyboards (in "Arthur e o gigante", "Cruzado" and "Pé quente")
- Eduardo de Souza – keyboards (in "13")
- Paulo Calazans – keyboards (in "Boa nova")
- Zelli – keyboards (in "Filhos")
- Marcos Nimirither – piano (in "Alpha")
- Glauton Campello – piano (in "13") and keyboards (in "Boa nova", "Cabeça de nêgo" and "Miles")
- Kiko Continentino – piano Rhodes (in "Grooveland")
- Leo Gandelman – saxophone (in "Arthur e o gigante")
- Zé Canuto – saxophone (in "Grooveland")
- Mauro Senise – saxophone (in "Pé quente")
- Marcelo Martins – flute (in "Arthur e o gigante"), saxophone (in "Alpha", "13", "Boa nova", "Cruzado", "Pé quente" and "Cabeça de nêgo") and keyboards (in "Alpha")
- Chico Oliveira – trumpet (in "Boa nova" and "Cruzado")
- Paulo Williams – trombone (in "Pé quente")
- Turri Moreno – drums (in "Sonora")
- Carlos Gomes (Bala) – drums (in "Arthur e o gigante", "13", "B12", "Boa nova" and "Pé quente")
- Kenwood Dennard – drums (in "Alpha" and "Nirvana com Nescau")
- Paulo Braga – drums (in "Grooveland" and "Cruzado") and vocals (in "Grooveland")
- Célio de Oliveira – percussion (in "Arthur e o gigante")
- L. F. Pirulito – percussion (in "13")
- Armando Marçal – percussion (in "Filhos" and "Besteira")
- Marcos Suzano – percussion (in "Cruzado")
- Sidinho Moreira – percussion (in "Pé quente" and "Cabeça de nêgo")
- Claudio Infante – REB fills (in "Cabeça de nêgo")
- Luciana de Souza – vocals (in "13")
- Vó Altair – stories in "Sonora"
