= Luizão Maia =

Luiz de Oliveira da Costa Maia (April 3, 1949 – January 28, 2005) is a musician widely acknowledged as the father of the modern Brazilian bass. His unparalleled sense of rhythm and deep subwoofer-like tone stirred the sauce behind the classic recordings of Elis Regina, João Bosco, Tom Jobim, Djavan and Chico Buarque. He was the uncle of Arthur Maia.

Maia began playing music, starting with the guitar, at age thirteen, and then progressed to the double bass. He began playing professionally in 1964 as the bassist for the Rio Samba Trio and as an accompanist to musicians such as Tania Maria and Nelson Cavaquinho. He went on to join numerous other groups, worked as a session musician, and toured throughout the 70s and 80s. In 1993, Maia suffered a stroke that paralyzed his right hand. However he developed a technique of playing only with his left hand and continued performing, including a tribute to Elis Regina in 1998. He never recorded a solo album.
