= Bares y Fondas =

Studio album by Los Fabulosos Cadillacs
- Released: 1986
- Genre: Rock en español, ska
- Length: 40:47
- Label: Interdisc; Universal Music
- Producer: Daniel Melingo

Los Fabulosos Cadillacs chronology
Bares y Fondas (1986)	Yo Te Avise (1987)

Bares y Fondas (Spanish for Bars and Taverns) released in 1986, is the first studio album recorded by Los Fabulosos Cadillacs of Argentina. The album's main genre is Ska. The music, just like the wardrobe in the early band's concerts, was influenced by bands like Madness and The Specials. These aspects were unusual for Argentine rock bands of that period, and gave the Cadillacs (the popular shortened version of the band's name) a distinctive artistic appeal.

The album was originally going to be called "Noches Cálidas en Bares y Fondas" (Warm Nights in Bars and Taverns), based on the places where the band hung out and played, but in the end it was decided to use the shorter name, with the same meaning.

The singles of the album were the energetic "Yo Quiero Morirme Aca" ('I Want to Die Here'), the nervous "Silencio Hospital" ('Be Quiet, This is a Hospital') and the ballad "Basta de Llamarme Asi" ('Stop Calling Me That', a song composed by Vicentico as a homage to his defunct sister Tamara).

== Reception ==
The album was coldly received by the press, who accused the band of having simple-minded lyrics. To this Vicentico replied:

“Our songs hold a little irony, they are personal stories, anyone can relate to them. Essentially we like people to have just as much fun as we do on the stage. Our message is basically given through our music, something like "dance and shut up", something that our audience understands perfectly”.

Nonetheless, in recent years Vicentico accepted that early criticism to some extent:

“We were pretty dumb, stupid, truly retarded. We couldn't play. But there were some respectable songs like "Basta de Llamarme Asi"”.

The Allmusic review by Victor W. Valdivia awarded the album 2 stars stating "Their first album... was barely an embryonic precursor to future glories... This is definitely a tamer, gentler Fabulosos Cadillacs... There's even a sensitive love ballad, "Galapagos," the kind that they would never even come close to again. It's obvious that at this point the Cadillacs are not much more than the sum of their influences. It's a pleasant enough listen, but hardly representative of their music, and would really be worthy only for diehards".

Professional ratings
Review scores
Source	Rating
Allmusic	2/5 stars

== Track listing ==
1. "Vos Sin Sentimiento" ("You Without Feeling") (Flavio Cianciarulo) – 4:38
2. "Yo Quiero Morirme Acá" ("I Want to Die Here") (Vicentico) – 2:35
3. "Galápagos" (Cianciarulo) – 3:45
4. "La Manera Correcta de Gritar" ("The Proper Way to Scream") (Cianciarulo) – 3:20
5. "Tus Tontas Trampas" ("Your Foolish Traps") (Cianciarulo, Riggozi) – 2:20
6. "Bares y Fondas" ("Bars and Fondas") (Vicentico, Cianciarulo) – 3:41
7. "En Mis Venas" ("In My Veins") (Vicentico) – 2:57
8. "Silencio Hospital" ("Hospital, Silence") (Vicentico, Siperman) – 1:58
9. "Noches Árabes" ("Arabic Nights") (Rotman, Vazzano) – 3:08
10. "Estamos Perdiendo" ("We are Losing") (Vicentico, Cianciarulo) – 5:24
11. "Belcha" (Cianciarulo, Giugno) – 2:49
12. "Basta de Llamarme Así" ("Stop Calling Me In That Way") (Vicentico) – 4:16

== Personnel ==
- Vicentico – vocals
- Flavio Cianciarulo – bass
- Luciano Giugno – percussion
- Serguei Itzcowick – trumpet
- Aníbal Rigozzi – guitar
- Fernando Ricciardi – drums
- Mario Siperman – keyboard.
- Naco Goldfinger – alto saxophone
- Sergio Rotman – saxophone
