= Rey Azúcar =

Studio album by Los Fabulosos Cadillacs
- Released: June 1995
- Recorded: November 1994–January 1995
- Genre: Rock, ska, Latin, experimental, alternative rock, dub
- Length: 61:56
- Label: Sony Music, Epic
- Producer: Tina Weymouth, Chris Frantz

Los Fabulosos Cadillacs chronology
En Vivo en Buenos Aires (1994)	Rey Azúcar (1995)	Fabulosos Calavera (1997)

Rey Azúcar (Spanish for Sugar King) is the tenth album by Argentine band Los Fabulosos Cadillacs. It was produced by Tina Weymouth and Chris Frantz of Talking Heads, and contained guest appearances from punk icons Mick Jones of The Clash (on "Mal Bicho") and Blondie's Debbie Harry (on a ska version of "Strawberry Fields Forever," sung in Spanish and English), as well as reggae star Big Youth on several tracks. The album title comes from a line on the song "Las Venas Abiertas de América Latina". The song is based on Eduardo Galeano's book of the same title, which also contains a chapter called Rey Azúcar.

The original release as well as the remastering received platinum certifications.

== Reception ==
The Allmusic review by Victor W. Valdivia awarded the album 4 stars stating "With Rey Azucar, Los Fabulosos Cadillacs made their most high-profile album to date... Earlier Cadillacs albums were rooted almost exclusively in ska, reggae, and salsa, but on this record the band developed a harder sound, interspersing thrash and punk into the mix... Another significant change is that the album, apart from some light touches, seems to reflect a darker lyrical tone. Several tracks make references to depression and suicide. It's clearly an attempt to expand their musical and lyrical range, and on the whole, the album succeeds. The songwriting isn't as fully developed as it would be later on, but it's a superb place to start".

Professional ratings
Review scores
Source	Rating
Allmusic	4/5 stars

== Track listing ==
1. "Mal Bicho" ("Bad Bug") (Flavio Cianciarulo) – 4:05
2. "Strawberry Fields Forever" (Lennon–McCartney) – 4:17
3. "Carmela" (Fernando Ricciardi) – 2:58
4. "Paquito" (Cianciarulo) – 2:52
5. "Ciego de Amor" ("Blind of Love") (Sergio Rotman) - 5:28
6. "Miami" (Rotman) – 3:00
7. "Raggapunkypartyrebelde" ("Raggapunkypartyrebel") (Cianciarulo) – 3:34
8. "Estrella de Mar" ("Starfish") (Vicentico) – 4:31
9. "Las Venas Abiertas de América Latina" ("The Open Veins of Latin America") (Cianciarulo) – 2:43
10. "Reparito" (Vicentico, Fernando Albareda) – 2:24
11. "Padre Nuestro" ("Lord's Prayer" / Lit. "Our Father") (Vicentico) – 3:34
12. "Muerte Querida" ("Dear Death") (Vicentico) – 4:17
13. "Hora Cero" ("Zero Hour") (Rotman, Vicentico) – 4:38
14. "Queen From the Ghetto" (Big Youth, Rotman) – 5:29
15. "Saco Azul" ("Blue Coat") (Vicentico, Valeria Bertuccelli) – 3:36
16. "No Pienses Que Fui Yo" ("Don't Think it Was Me") (Mario Siperman) – 4:29

== Personnel ==
- Vicentico – vocals
- Flavio Cianciarulo – bass
- Anibal Rigozzi – guitar
- Mario Siperman – keyboards
- Fernando Ricciardi – drums
- Gerardo Rotblat – percussion
- Naco Goldfinger – tenor saxophone
- Sergio Rotman – alto saxophone
- Daniel Lozano – trumpet & flugelhorn

=== Additional Personnel ===
- Mick Jones – vocals on "Mal Bicho"
- Deborah Harry – vocals on "Strawberry Fields Forever" and "Estrella de Mar"
- Big Youth – vocals on "Raggapunkypartyrebelde", "Queen From The Ghetto", and "No Pienses que Fui Yo"
- Valeria Bertuccelli – reciting on "Saco Azul"

== Sales ==
Region	Certification	Certified units/sales
Argentina	—	200,000<
