= Thomas Scott (preacher) =

English preacher (c.1580–1626)

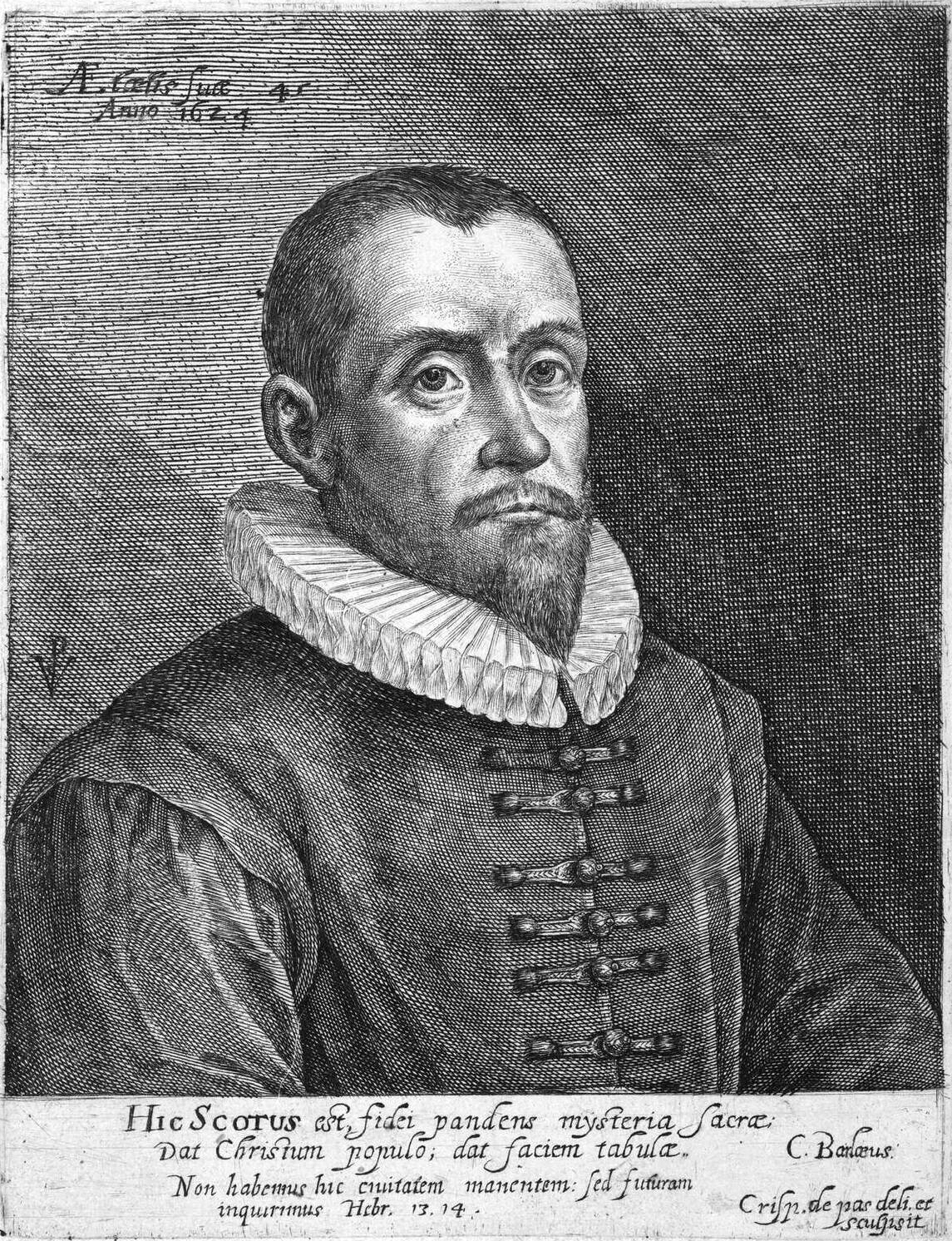
Thomas Scott (Crispijn de Passe (I), 1624)

Thomas Scott (or Scot) (c. 1580 – 1626) was an English preacher, a radical Protestant known for anti-Spanish and anti-Catholic pamphlets.

== Life ==
He was born about 1580, and occurs as one of the chaplains to James I in 1616, being then B.D. He was incorporated in that degree at Cambridge in 1620 as a member of Peterhouse, as a graduate of the University of St Andrews.

He was rector of St. Saviour's, Norwich, and when Count Gondomar arrived in England to settle preliminaries for the Spanish Match, he published in 1620 an anonymous tract against the proposed marriage. It was entitled Vox Populi, and purported to give an account of Gondomar's reception by the council of state upon his return to Madrid in 1618. The ambassador is there made to explain his schemes for bringing England into subjection to Spain, to describe with satisfaction the crowds which went to assist at mass in his chapel in London, and to recount how he had won over the leading courtiers by his bribes. The whole story was a fabrication, but at the time it was widely received as a piece of genuine history, and caused a furore. John Chamberlain on 3 February 1621 informed Sir Dudley Carleton that 'the author of "Vox Populi" is discovered to be one Scot, a minister, bewrayed by the printer, who thereby hath saved himself, and got his pardon, though the book were printed beyond sea'. Joseph Mead, writing on 10 February 1621, told Sir Martin Stuteville that 'Scot of Norwich, who is said to be the author of "Vox Populi," they say is now fled, having, as it seems, fore-notice of the pursuivant'. In Vox Regis (1624) Scott gave in biblical language an account of the motives which induced him to write Vox Populi, and the consequences of that publication to himself. Vox Populi was suppressed by royal authority, and Samuel Harsnett, bishop of Norwich, was commanded to institute proceedings against him.

In 1622, Scott became preacher to the English garrison at Utrecht. There he continued writing pamphlets against the Roman Catholics, many of which were published in England after Scott's departure. He was assassinated by an English soldier named John Lambert on 18 June 1626, as he was coming out of church, accompanied by his brother William Scott and his nephew Thomas Scott. The assassin was tortured, but denied that Catholic priests or Jesuits had motivated him to act. Insane and subject to hallucinations, he was condemned to death and executed, his right hand being first cut off.

== Works ==
Vox Populi was one of two dozen pamphlets he wrote. It has been argued that through Scott the Scottish version of republicanism came to have an important impact in England. Most libraries credit him with writing "Robert Earle of Essex His Ghost" (1624).

He has tentatively been identified with the Thomas Scot or Scott (fl. 1605), poet, who described himself as a gentleman, and who wrote several poetical works. It appears from a letter addressed by Locke to Sir Dudley Carleton on 2 February 1621 that the minister of Norwich, then suspected of being the author of Vox Populi, had, in Somerset's time, been questioned about a 'book of birds'. The poetical writer published the following pieces:

- 'Four Paradoxes of Arte, of Lawe, of Warre, of Service [a poem]. By T. S.,' London, 1602.
- 'Philomythie or Philomythologie, wherein outlandish Birds, Beasts, and Fishes are taught to speak true English,' London, 1610; 2nd edit, 'much inlarged,' London, 1616. Some copies of the second edition are dated 1622; others 1640. One poem is entitled 'Regalis Justitia Jacobi,' in which Scott celebrates the impartial justice of King James in refusing to pardon Robert Crichton, 8th Lord Crichton of Sanquhar, for the deliberate murder of Turner, the celebrated fencer, in 1612.
- 'The Second Part of Philomythie or Philomythologie. Containing certaine Tales of True Libertie, False Friendship. Power Vnited. Faction and Ambition,' London, 1616 and 1625.
- Vox Dei 1623
