= Hola/Chau =

Live album by Los Fabulosos Cadillacs
- Released: 2001
- Recorded: September, 1, 2/29 2000
- Genres: Rock en español, ska, Latin, reggae
- Length: 52:50/64:17
- Labels: BMG, Ariola

Los Fabulosos Cadillacs chronology
La Marcha del Golazo Solitario (1999)	Hola/Chau (2001)	La Luz del Ritmo (2008)

The cover of Chau

Hola/Chau (Spanish for Hello/Bye), released in 2001, are the thirteenth and fourteenth albums from the Argentine band Los Fabulosos Cadillacs. These, their second live album set, are twin concert albums recorded at the Estadio Obras Sanitarias in Argentina. The concert includes most of the band's hits as well as a reunion with some of the former members of the band.

In the concert, many of the songs differ for the original versions in length and sound: some of them are given an edgier sound, on others long instrumental passages are added (like "Piraña, Todos Los Argentinos Somos D.T.", which is given a two-minute percussion break) and some a more light, faster sound (such as "Vasos Vacíos", in which the audience and Vicentico alternate the part of Celia Cruz). Additionally, a few songs contain spoken sections by Vicentico, most memorably on "Basta de Llamarme Asi", in which he explains the song's history to the audience, and "Los Condenaditos", in which he delivers a closing speech asking for a social awakening.

Both albums were a commercial success, earning RIAA Gold status in Mexico and Argentina. It was also seen as a farewell from the band. The fans were left with the final words by Vicentico: "We'll see each other soon, very, very soon."

== Reception ==
=== Hola ===
The Allmusic review by Victor W. Valdivia awarded the album 3 stars stating "Hola stakes the band's claim as one of the finest live acts anywhere. For one thing, the set list is superbly chosen. Rather than relying on the most recent album the band was touring to support the set list reaches all the way back to their first album and picks many classic tracks from all the albums in between."

Professional ratings
Review scores
Source	Rating
Allmusic	3/5 stars

=== Chau ===
The Allmusic review by Victor W. Valdivia awarded the album 3 stars stating "The companion piece to the live album Hola, recorded at the same shows in Argentina, contains less-accessible material than Hola (although it does contain their most famous song, "Matador," which, predictably, sounds even more thunderous live)... The album works because the more thoughtful, reflective songs, like "Siguiendo La Luna," translate to the stage far better than could be imagined, especially when the audience sings along. "Vasos Vacios," especially, becomes downright sublime and "Salvador Y Los Cordones Flojos," hardly a standout on La Marcha de Golazo Solitario, reveals a new complexity and power. Chau may be a half-step below as accessible as its companion, Hola, but by no means is it forgettable, and fans and newcomers alike will definitely find a lot to like here".

Professional ratings
Review scores
Source	Rating
Allmusic	3/5 stars

== Track listing ==
=== Hola ===
1. "Cadillacs" (Vicentico, Flavio Cianciarulo) – 1:24
2. "Demasiada Presión" ("Too Much Pressure") (Vicentico) – 3:41
3. "El Aguijón" ("The Sting") (Vicentico) – 3:22
4. "El Genio del Dub" ("The Genius of Dub") (Vicentico, Cianciarulo, Fernando Ricciardi, Sergio Rotman) – 4:11
5. "Calaveras y Diablitos" ("Skulls and Little Devils") (Cianciarulo) – 3:56
6. "Yo Quiero Morirme Acá" ("I Want to Die Here") (Vicentico) – 1:57
7. "Carmela" (Ricciardi) – 3:41
8. "Roble" ("Oak") (Vicentico) – 3:29
9. "El Crucero del Amor" ("The Cruise of Love") (Cianciarulo, Rotman) – 5:37
10. "La Vida" ("The Life") (Cianciarulo) – 3:14
11. "La Marcha del Golazo Solitario" ("The March of the Lonely Impressive Goal") (Angelo Moore, Norwood Fisher, Cianciarulo) – 5:33
12. "Mal Bicho" ("Bad Guy") (Cianciarulo) – 5:05
13. "El Satánico Dr. Cadillac" ("The Satanic Dr. Cadillac") (Vicentico) – 3:55
14. "Yo No Me Sentaría en Tu Mesa" ("I Would Not Sit In Your Table") (Vicentico, Pardo, Rotman) – 3:46

=== Chau ===
1. "Manuel Santillán, el León" ("Manuel Santillan, the Lion") (Cianciarulo) – 4:01
2. "Salvador y los Cordones Flojos" ("Salvador and the Loose Cords") (Cianciarulo) – 3:30
3. "Vos Sabés" ("You Know") (Cianciarulo) – 3:15
4. "No. 2 en Tu Lista" ("2nd on Your List") (Vicentico) – 3:57
5. "Siguiendo la Luna" ("Following the Moon") (Rotman) – 4:36
6. "Estoy Harto de Verte con Otros" ("I`m Tired of Seeing You With Others") (Vicentico) – 5:32
7. "Piraña, Todos los Argentinos Somos D.T." ("Piranha, We Argentines are all coaches") (Cianciarulo) – 4:48
8. "Vasos Vacíos" ("Empty Glasses") (Vicentico) – 4:07
9. "La Pomeña" (Manuel Castilla, Gustavo Leguizamón) – 3:16
10. "Basta de Llamarme Así" ("Stop Calling me That Way") (Vicentico) – 4:33
11. "Silencio Hospital" ("Hospital, Silence") (Capello, Siperman) - 2:01
12. "Carnaval Toda la Vida" ("Carnaval Forever") (Vicentico) – 4:15
13. "Matador" ("Killer") (Cianciarulo) – 5:19
14. "Padre Nuestro" ("Our Father") (Vicentico) – 2:35
15. "Los Condenaditos" ("The Little Condemned") (Vicentico, Rotblat – 8:34

== Personnel ==
- Vicentico – vocals
- Flavio Cianciarulo – bass
- Ariel Minimal – guitar
- Mario Siperman – keyboards
- Fernando Ricciardi – drums
- Daniel Lozano – trumpet & flugelhorn
- Fernando Albareda – trombone
- Gerardo "Toto" Rotblat – percussion
- Sergio Rotman – saxophone & backing vocals

=== Former Members ===
- Vaino Rigozzi – guitar
- Luciano Jr. – backing vocals
- Naco Goldfinger – backing vocals

=== Guests ===
- José Bale – percussion
- Pablo Puntoriero – saxophone & flute
- Gustavo Liamgot – electric piano & accordion
- Juan Pablo Quiroga – backing vocals

== DVD ==
A special 2-DVDs set with full footage of the concerts was released in 2006.

== Sales and certifications ==
Region	Certification	Certified units/sales
Argentina (CAPIF)	Platinum	40,000^{^}
Argentina (CAPIF) Remaster version (2008)	2× Platinum	80,000^{^}
Mexico (AMPROFON) for Hola	Gold	75,000^{^}
Mexico (AMPROFON) for Chau	Gold	75,000^{^}
^{^} Shipments figures based on certification alone.
