= In aller Stille =

Studio album by Die Toten Hosen
- Released: 14 November 2008
- Genre: Punk rock, heavy metal, emo, alternative rock
- Length: 42:01
- Label: JKP
- Producer: Vincent Sorg, Hans Steingen

Die Toten Hosen chronology
Mehr davon! Die Single-Box (2005)	In aller Stille (2008)	La hermandad - en el principio fue el ruido (2009)

In aller Stille (in complete silence) is the eleventh studio album by the German punk band Die Toten Hosen. It's the first studio album in 4 years. The cover was designed by Dirk Rudolph. The central theme of this album is energy.

The album was released in 3 versions:

- Standard Edition - regular CD
- Limited Edition - CD + DVD:

- "Innen alles neu - Wie alles anfing" (Inside all-new- How it all started) - a documentary
- "Strom" video

- Vinyl, hand-signed by the band, limited to 2000 units

In 2009 it was awarded a diamond certification from the Independent Music Companies Association which indicated sales of at least 250,000 copies throughout Europe.

== Track listing ==
1. "Strom" (Current) (Frege/Frege) − 2:48
2. "Innen alles neu" (All new inside) (Meurer/Frege) − 2:57
3. "Disco" (Frege/Frege) − 3:22
4. "Teil von mir" (Part of me) (von Holst/Frege) − 3:00
5. "Auflösen" (Dissolve) (Frege/Frege, Minichmayr) − 3:19 (duet with Birgit Minichmayr)
6. "Leben ist tödlich" (Life is deadly) (Meurer/Frege) − 3:26
7. "Ertrinken" (Drowning) (Breitkopf/Frege, Weitholz) − 4:13
8. "Alles was war" (All that was) (Breitkopf/Frege) − 3:05
9. "Pessimist" (Breitkopf/Frege) − 2:47
10. "Wir bleiben stumm" (We remain mute) (von Holst/Frege) − 3:33
11. "Die letzte Schlacht" (The final battle) (von Holst, Meurer/Frege) − 3:03
12. "Tauschen gegen dich" (Trade for you) (von Holst/Steingen, Frege) − 3:16
13. "Angst" (Fear) (von Holst/Frege) − 3:12

=== Musicload bonus track ===
14. "Das ist vorbei" (It's over) − 3:26

== Singles ==
2008: "Strom"
2009: "Alles was war"
2009: "Auflösen"
2009: "Ertrinken"

== Personnel ==
- Campino - vocals
- Andreas von Holst (Kuddel) - guitar
- Michael Breitkopf (Breiti) - guitar
- Andreas Meurer (Andi) - bass
- Stephen George Ritchie (Vom) - drums
- Raphael Zweifel - cello on 5, 12
- Hans Steingen - piano, accordion, string instruments
- Birgit Minichmayr - vocals on 5

== Charts ==
Year	Country	Position
2008	Germany	1
2008	Austria	2
2008	Switzerland	3

=== Year-end charts ===
Chart (2008)	Rank
German Albums Chart	40

Chart (2009)	Rank
German Albums Chart	44

=== Certifications ===
Country	Certification (sales thresholds)
Germany	3× Gold
