= Auflösen =

Single by Die Toten Hosen

from the album In aller Stille
- Released: 5 June 2009
- Genre: Soft rock, cello rock, jazz
- Length: 3:19
- Label: JKP
- Songwriters: Andreas Frege; Birgit Minichmayr

Die Toten Hosen singles chronology
"Alles was war" (2009)	"Auflösen" (2009)	"Ertrinken" (2009)

"Auflösen" (Break up) is a song by Die Toten Hosen, namely a duet between Campino and Birgit Minichmayr. It was the third single from the album In aller Stille. It reached no.38 in Germany and no.36 in Austria.

This is also the first duet for the band. It differs from the others songs on the album greatly because of the extreme tenderness of it, while most of the album is quite loud. The song describes, how shallow a physical relationship between a man and a woman is, as it doesn't really make a difference between them, if they would break up.

The song also features Raphael Zweifel on cello and Hans Steingen on piano, although in the video it is played by Esther Kim, who has supported Die Toten Hosen in concerts and also played the piano, when the band and Minichmayr performed the song in the Echo awards ceremony of 2009.

== Music video ==
The video debuted on dietotenhosen.de. It was directed by Wim Wenders, who had previously also directed the video for "Warum werde ich nicht satt?". The video is shot in black-and-white.

Most of the video shows Campino and Minichmayr together, singing or having sex, hinting to a physical relationship between them. Also intercut are shots of the band playing and, during the break, also Esther Kim on piano and Raphael Zweifel on cello.

== Track listing ==
1. "Auflösen" (Frege/Frege, Minichmayr) − 3:21
2. "All You Need Is Love" (John Lennon/Paul McCartney) − 2:59 (The Beatles cover)
3. "Fast wie im Film" (Almost like in film) (Frege/Frege) − 2:19
