= El Ritmo Mundial =

Studio album by Los Fabulosos Cadillacs
- Released: October 1988
- Studio: Estudios Panda, Buenos Aires
- Genre: Rock en español, ska, pop rock
- Length: 37:30
- Label: CBS
- Producer: Los Fabulosos Cadillacs & Mario Breuer

Los Fabulosos Cadillacs chronology
Yo Te Avise (1987)	El Ritmo Mundial (1988)	El Satanico Dr. Cadillac (1989)

El Ritmo Mundial (Spanish for The World Rhythm) Released in 1988 is the third studio album of the Argentine ska and pop rock band Los Fabulosos Cadillacs. Recorded and released in 1988, in this album the band expands their musical range to more current commercial genres. The album now includes the classic ska along with the apparition of a couple of ballads "Siempre me Hablaste de Ella" and "No. 2 en tu Lista".

The singles were "Revolution Rock", "Conversación Nocturna" and the popular "Vasos Vacios" in which the famous Cuban singer Celia Cruz performs a duo with Vicentico.

== Track listing ==
1. "Es Tan Lejos de Aquí" ("It's So Far Away From Here") (Vicentico, Flavio Cianciarulo) – 3:42
2. "Revolution Rock" (Jackie Edwards, Danny Ray) – 4:55
3. "Vasos Vacíos" ("Empty Glasses") (Vicentico) – 4:37
4. "Siempre Me Hablaste de Ella" ("You Always Talked to me About Her") (Cianciarulo) – 2:52
5. "Botella de Humo" ("Smoke Bottle") (Sergio Rotman) – 2:26
6. "Conversación Nocturna" ("Night Time Conversation") (Rigozzi, Ricciardi, Siperman, Vicentico) – 3:30
7. "Tengo Solamente Dos Maneras de Estar Cerca del Cielo" ("I Only Have Two Ways of Being Close to Heaven") (Vicentico, Cianciarulo) – 2:57
8. "Más Solo Que la Noche Anterior" ("Lonelier than Last Night") (Vicentico, Cianciarulo) – 3:58
9. "El No. 2 En Tu Lista" ("The No. 2 in Your List") (Vicentico) – 3:52
10. "Twist y Gritos" ("Twist and Shouts") (Phil Medley, Bert Russell) – 2:30
11. "Te Tiraré del Altar" ("I`ll Throw you Off the Altar") (Vicentico, Giugno) – 2:11

== Personnel ==
- Vicentico – vocals
- Flavio Cianciarulo – bass
- Anibal Rigozzi – guitar
- Mario Siperman – keyboard
- Fernando Ricciardi – drums
- Luciano Giugno – percussion
- Naco Goldfinger – tenor saxophone
- Sergio Rotman – alto saxophone
- Daniel Lozano – trumpet & flugelhorn
