= Vox Dei =

Vox Dei may refer to:

- Vox Dei (band), an Argentine rock band
  - Vox Dei para Vox Dei, a 1974 album by the band
- Vox Dei (phrase) (Latin, Voice of God)
- Vox Dei (Thomas Scott), a 1624 tract

== See also ==
- Vox populi (disambiguation)
- Vox populi, vox Dei, 'the voice of the people [is] the voice of God'
- Vox Day (Theodore Robert Beale, born 1968), an American writer and activist
