= El León (album) =

Album by Los Fabulosos Cadillacs

Studio album by Los Fabulosos Cadillacs
- Released: 1992
- Genre: Latin rock, ska
- Length: 62:23
- Label: Sony Music, Columbia
- Producer: K.C. Porter

Los Fabulosos Cadillacs chronology
Sopa de Caracol (1991)	El León (1992)	Vasos Vacíos (1993)

El León (Spanish for The Lion) is the seventh studio album by the Argentine ska and reggae band Los Fabulosos Cadillacs. Released in 1992, the album combines multiple genres and incorporates Caribbean rhythms as well as salsa, calypso and reggae influences. It is a notable album in the history of Argentine rock. In 2007, the Argentine edition of Rolling Stone ranked it 21 on its list of "The 100 Greatest Albums of National Rock".

"Carnaval Toda La Vida" and "Gitana" are carnival hymns, while "Manuel Santillán, El León" is discernibly a Reggae track, "Siguiendo La Luna" is a ballad, and "El Aguijón" and "Crucero del Amor" contain aspects of reggae and salsa. Many songs from the album were released as singles, enjoying moderate to great success, such as "Desapariciones", a cover of a song by Panamanian songwriter Rubén Blades. The album was certified Platinum by CAPIF.

== Reception ==
The Allmusic review by Victor W. Valdivia awarded the album 2.5 stars, stating, "El León is a transitional album. Throughout the album, it's clear the Fabulosos Cadillacs are slowly developing their fusion of rock, reggae, and Latin music ... A cover of Ruben Blades' 'Desapariciones', a song about the victims of Argentina's military dictatorship, is the album's most powerful number. The title cut (done in two versions: reggae and salsa) depicts an urban hell in vivid terms."

Professional ratings
Review scores
Source	Rating
Allmusic	2.5/5 stars

== Track listing ==
1. "Carnaval Toda La Vida" (Vicentico) – 6:03
2. "Manuel Santillán, El León (Reggae)" (Flavio Cianciarulo) – 3:57
3. "Gitana" (Cianciarulo) – 3:12
4. "Siguiendo La Luna" (Sergio Rotman) – 4:57
5. "Gallo Rojo" (Vicentico) – 4:27
6. "El Crucero del Amor" (Cianciarulo, Rotman) – 4:23
7. "Destino de Paria" (Vicentico) – 5:01
8. "Arde Buenos Aires" (Cianciarulo) – 3:14
9. "Desapariciones" (Rubén Blades) – 5:35
10. "Venganza" (Cianciarulo) – 5:10
11. "Cartas, Flores y un Puñal" (Cianciarulo) – 2:16
12. "El Aguijón" (Vicentico) – 4:51
13. "Soledad" (Cianciarulo) – 3:00
14. "Manuel Santillán, El León (Salsa)" (Cianciarulo) – 3:23
15. "Ríos de Lágrimas" (Rotman) – 2:54

== Contributing Artists ==
- Vicentico – vocals
- Flavio Cianciarulo – bass
- Anibal Rigozzi – guitar
- Mario Siperman – keyboard
- Fernando Ricciardi – drums
- Toto Roblat – percussion
- Fernando Albareda – trombone
- Sergio Rotman – alto saxophone
- Daniel Lozano – trumpet & flugelhorn
