= Fabulosos Calavera =

Studio album by Los Fabulosos Cadillacs
- Released: July 1997
- Recorded: October 1996–May 1997
- Genre: Rock en español, ska, Latin, experimental, punk rock
- Length: 62:02
- Label: Sony Music
- Producer: K.C. Porter

Los Fabulosos Cadillacs chronology
Rey Azúcar (1995)	Fabulosos Calavera (1997)	20 Grandes Exitos (1998)

Fabulosos Calavera (Spanish for Fabulous Skull) Released in 1997 is the eleventh album by Argentine band Los Fabulosos Cadillacs. This album has a much darker theme than the previous album of the band talking about death, the devil and hidden messages. This fact, however, didn't stop it for getting gold disc and latter platinum on remastering and the Carlos Gardel Award. The best example of the tone of the album is the fourth track "Sábato", a tribute to Ernesto Sabato and his books The Tunnel and On Heroes and Tombs, while track 11 is a homage to Argentine tango musician and composer Ástor Piazzolla. Track 7, "Hoy Lloré Canción", features famous salsa songwriter Rubén Blades.

== Reception ==
The Allmusic review by Victor W. Valdivia awarded the album 4 stars stating "Arguably the most focused, self-assured record of their career, Fabulosos Calavera shows the Cadillacs incorporating the hardest, heaviest guitar rock they've ever played into their usual mélange of ska, reggae, Caribbean, and Latin rhythms... the songwriting is superbly honed – there seem to be no fat or extraneous parts in any of the album's 13 tracks. "Surfer Calavera" mixes thrash, funk, reggae, and harmony vocals into the album's most infectious track... Rather than being distracting, however, such stylistic shifts enhance the energy and highlight the emotional contrasts of the music... Fabulosos Calavera demonstrates that it is possible to have fun and give listeners plenty to chew on motionally. 12 years into their career, they made their most successful record yet".

Professional ratings
Review scores
Source	Rating
Allmusic	4/5 stars

== Track listing ==
1. "El Muerto" ("The Deadman") (Flavio Cianciarulo) – 4:05
2. "Surfer Calavera" ("Skull Surfer") (Cianciarulo) – 4:34
3. "El Carnicero de Giles/Sueño" ("The Butcher of Giles/Dream") (Vicentico, Cianciarulo) – 3:39
4. "Sábato" (Cianciarulo) – 4:40
5. "Howen" (Fernando Ricciardi) – 2:29
6. "A Amigo J.V." ("To Friend J.V.") (Vicentico) – 5:05
7. "Hoy Lloré Canción" ("Today I Cried Song") (Cianciarulo, Rubén Blades) – 4:00
8. "Calaveras y Diablitos" ("Skulls and Little Devils") (Cianciarulo) – 4:22
9. "Il Pajarito" ("The Little Bird") (Vicentico) – 3:17
10. "Niño Diamante" ("Diamond Child") (Vicentico) – 5:59
11. "Piazzolla" (Cianciarulo) – 4:20
12. "Amnesia" (Sergio Rotman) – 2:27
13. "A.D.R.B. (En Busca Eterna)" ("A.D.R.B. (In Eternal Search)") (Vicentico) – 6:01

=== Bonus tracks ===
(Played at the end of Track 13)

1. "Surfer Calavera (radio edit)"
2. "Howen (radio edit)"

== Personnel ==
- Vicentico – vocals
- Flavio Cianciarulo – bass
- Ariel Minimal – guitar
- Mario Siperman – keyboards
- Fernando Ricciardi – drums
- Sergio Rotman – alto saxophone
- Daniel Lozano – trumpet & flugelhorn
- Fernando Albareda – trombone
- Gerardo Rotblat – percussion

=== Additional Personnel ===
- Rubén Blades – vocals on "Hoy Lloré Canción"

== Sales and certifications ==
Region	Certification	Certified units/sales
Argentina (CAPIF)	Gold	30,000^{^}
Argentina (CAPIF) Remaster version (2008)	Platinum	40,000^{^}
^{^} Shipments figures based on certification alone.
