= Los Fabulosos Cadillacs =

Ska and rock band from Argentina

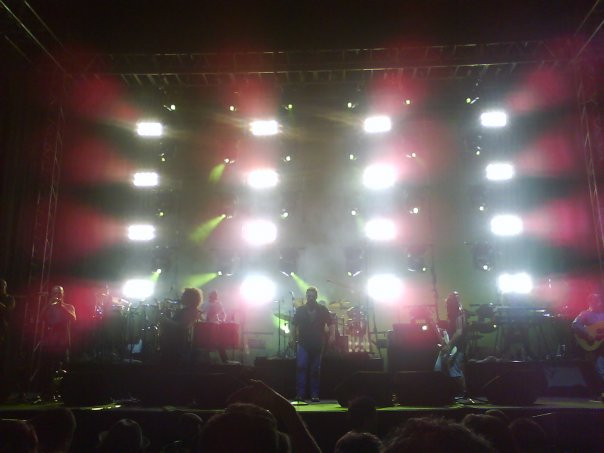

Background information
- Origin: Buenos Aires, Argentina
- Genres: Ska; salsa; samba; reggae; mambo
- Years active: 1985–2002; 2006; 2008–present
- Labels: Sony; Columbia
- Members: Vicentico; Sr. Flavio; Sergio Rotman; Mario Siperman; Fernando Ricciardi; Daniel Lozano; Astor Cianciarulo; Florián Fernandez Capello
- Website: fabulososcadillacs.com

Official Los Fabulosos Cadillacs logo

Los Fabulosos Cadillacs (Spanish pronunciation: [los faβuˈlosos ˈkaðilaks], lit. 'The Fabulous Cadillacs') is an Argentine musical group from Buenos Aires. Their music fuses ska with Latin rock and various other styles.

== Background and style ==
Formed in 1985, they released their first album, Bares y Fondas (Bars and Boardinghouses), in 1986 and have since released fourteen more albums. They are one of the most influential and most-referenced ska bands of the Latin ska world.

The band's sound is a mix of ska, salsa, mambo, reggae, funk and samba. It is also noted for its irreverent and humorous lyrics which often contain political undertones. The line-up has changed throughout the years, but the core members have always been the co-founders: lead singer Gabriel Fernández Capello (known as Vicentico) and bass player and backing vocalist Flavio Cianciarulo (known as Sr. Flavio). Vicentico and Sr. Flavio are the leading songwriters and lyricists of the band. Saxophonist Sergio Rotman, drummer Fernando Ricciardi and keyboard player Mario Siperman have also been in all line-ups of the band. Trumpeter Daniel Lozano joined in 1986, replacing Serguei Itzcowick. Another saxophonist, Naco Goldfinger was in the band from 1985 to 1991. Guitarist Aníbal Rigozzi was a founding member and left the group in 1996 to be replaced by Ariel Minimal, who left the group in 2008. Trombonist Fernando Albareda was in the band from 1991 to 2008. Percussionist Luciano Giugno was also a founding member, leaving in 1989. His replacement, Gerardo Rotblat joined in 1991; he died in 2008.

== Collaborations and recognition ==
The band, which collaborated with some music stars such as Mick Jones, Debbie Harry, Celia Cruz, Rubén Blades and Fishbone, received the MTV Video Music Award for International Viewer's Choice (Latin America) in 1994 for the single "El Matador", in what probably was the peak of popularity of the band. On September 29 of that year, they produced an MTV Unplugged concert. The Cadillacs also won the inaugural Grammy Award for Best Latin Rock/Alternative Performance for Fabulosos Calavera in 1998, and were nominated in the 1st Annual Latin Grammy Awards for Best Rock Performance by a Duo/Group with Vocals and Best Music Video for "La Vida", which received the MTV Video Music Award for International Viewer's Choice (Southern Latin America) in 2000.

== Return ==
On April 7, 2008, the band's front man, Vicentico, announced the band's return from a six-year break. According to Vicentico's mySpace, this represented a new phase for the band. On March 10, 2009, they released a new album, La Luz del Ritmo, distributed by Nacional Records in the US. Along with the release, the band toured throughout spring 2009 in the Americas.

Along with the news of their return, Vicentico's MySpace announced that due to Gerardo "Toto" Rotblat's recent death, the band had been forced to make changes. The new line-up was as follows: Vicentico (lead vocals), Flavio Cianciarulo (bass and backing vocals), Sergio Rotman (saxophone), Daniel Lozano (trumpet), Fernando Ricciardi (drums and percussion) and Mario Siperman (keyboards), all of whom are LFC veterans. In 2016, Vicentico and Flavio Cianciarulo's sons joined: Florián Fernández Capello (guitars) and Astor Cianciarulo (drums and bass).

== Discography ==
=== Studio albums ===
- Bares y Fondas (1986)
- Yo Te Avisé (1987)
- El Ritmo Mundial (1988)
- El Satanico Dr. Cadillac (1989)
- Volumen 5 (1990)
- El León (1992)
- Rey Azúcar (1995)
- Fabulosos Calavera (1997)
- La Marcha del Golazo Solitario (1999)
- La Luz del Ritmo (2008)
- La Salvación de Solo y Juan (2016)

=== Compilation albums ===
- Sopa de Caracol (1991)
- Vasos Vacíos (1993)
- 20 Grandes Exitos (1998)
- Obras Cumbres (2000)
- El Arte De La Elegancia De LFC (2009)

=== Live albums ===
- En Vivo en Buenos Aires (1994)
- Hola (2001)
- Chau (2001)
- En Vivo en The Theater at Madison Square Garden (2017)
