= Strom (song) =

Single by Die Toten Hosen

from the album In aller Stille
- Released: 24 October 2008
- Genre: Heavy metal, hard rock, melodic hardcore
- Length: 2:48
- Label: JKP
- Songwriter(s): Andreas Frege

Die Toten Hosen singles chronology
"The Guns of Brixton (unplugged)" (2006)	"Strom" (2008)	"Alles was war" (2009)

"Strom" (Current) is a song by Die Toten Hosen. It's the first single and the lead track from the album In aller Stille.

"Strom" can be described as the "soul" of the album, because its theme, energy, is also the main theme of the album. It is lyrically a comeback-song and an introduction to the album.

The first 8000 copies were limited digipak editions. The song was available as a free download on the band's website a week before the release of the single.

== Music video ==
The video premiered on MTV and on the band's website on 24 October. It was directed by Philipp Stölzl.

In the video, the band is rehearsing in the studio. A roadie offers to get some coffee and goes to get it. The band then starts playing as smoke starts coming from the electrical equipment. Soon, the wires on the ground catch fire. (This was really bound to happen, because in spite of elementary safety rules, the wiring lies on wet floor.) The band gets electrocuted and the whole room is filled with bolts of electricity. They stop playing for a while, but continue in a second. The high voltage turns them into skeletons, but the band plays on. As they finish playing the song, they collapse into bone piles. The roadie walks in and spills the coffee with astonishment.

== Track listing ==
1. "Strom" - 2:48
2. "Dagegen" (Against) (Ritchie/Frege) - 2:22
3. "Traum" (Dream) (Breitkopf, Meurer/Frege) - 3:03
4. "Urlaubsgrüße" (Holiday greetings) (von Holst/Frege) - 3:08

== Charts ==
Chart (2008)	Position
Austria (Ö3 Austria Top 40)	20
Germany (GfK)	8
Switzerland (Schweizer Hitparade)	28
