= Uno, dos, ultraviolento =

"Un, dos, ultraviolento"

Single by Los Violadores

from the album Y ahora que pasa, eh?
- Released: 1985
- Recorded: March–April 1985, Estudios Panda, Buenos Aires
- Genre: Punk rock
- Length: 4:13
- Label: Umbral; Radio Tripoli (CD Re-issue)
- Songwriter: Gustavo "Stuka" Fossa

Los Violadores singles chronology
"Un, dos, ultraviolento" (1985)	"Ellos Son..." (1986)

"Uno, dos, ultraviolento" (in English: One, two, ultraviolent) is a song by Argentine punk rock band Los Violadores, featured as a single from their Y ahora que pasa, eh? album from 1985. The song was Los Violadores breakthrough as one of the better known punk rock bands of Argentina. The lyrics are inspired in the novel A Clockwork Orange. It was also covered in the 1990s by former Chilean band Los Prisioneros member, Claudio Narea with great success in the country.

Die Toten Hosen have covered the single in their album La hermandad – en el principio fue el ruido.

== Track listing ==
=== 12": Umbral / DX 1700 ===
A-Side

1. "Uno, dos, ultraviolento" - 5:30
2. "Por 1980 y Tantos" - 3:23

B-Side

1. "El Corregidor" - 4:35
2. "Auschwitz" - 2:31
3. "Chicas De La Cal" - 2:50

== Personnel ==
Musicians

- Pil Trafa – Lead vocals
- Stuka – Lead guitar, backing vocals.
- Robert "Polaco" Zelazeck – Bass
- Sergio Gramática – Drums

Additional personnel

- Carlos "Mundy" Epifanio - Producer
- Ramon Villanueva - Executive producer
