= Yo Te Avise =

Yo Te Avisé!

Studio album by Los Fabulosos Cadillacs
- Released: 1987
- Genre: Rock en español, ska
- Length: 39:49
- Label: Sony Music, Columbia
- Producer: Andres Calamaro

Los Fabulosos Cadillacs chronology
Bares y Fondas (1986)	Yo Te Avisé! (1987)	El Ritmo Mundial (1988)

Yo Te Avisé! (Spanish for I told you so!) is the second studio album from the Argentine Ska band Los Fabulosos Cadillacs and was released in 1987. Having built on their experience from the first album, the band also benefited from the assistance of Andres Calamaro in production. On this album, Daniel Lozano joined the band as a guest player on the trumpet, eventually becoming a full-time member.

The album was a step forward for the band; it sold more than 250 000 copies, earning the band a platinum certification, catapulting them to a moderate fame that allowed them to expand their tour schedule to countries outside of Argentina. Structurally, the album was an evolutionary shift for the band, with a focus on more elaborate songs and the incorporation of new genres in their sonic vocabulary, including reggae and dub, seen in the songs "Muy, Muy Temprano" and "El Genio del Dub", respectively.

The singles were "Mi Novia se Cayo en un Pozo Ciego", "Yo te Avise", the permanent concert opener "Cadillacs" and "Yo No Me Sentaria en Tu Mesa", which is still played in soccer matches in Argentina.

== Name ==
The name of the album is a direct reference to the way band members felt about their success and the skepticism of the media about the band; on that matter Vicentico says:

It is called that way because we knew it was going to be a success. Among the extramusical things we like the most is shutting up people who don`t know what they are talking about... They criticized us from the beginning.

== Track listing ==
1. "El Genio del Dub" ("The Genie of Dub") (Vicentico, Ricciardi, Sergio Rotman, Flavio Cianciarulo) – 5:21
2. "Botellas Rotas" ("Broken Bottles") (Cianciarulo) – 2:35
3. "Mi Novia Se Cayó En Un Pozo Ciego" ("My Girlfriend Fell In A Cesspool") (Vicentivo, Ricciardi, Cianciarulo, Giugno) – 3:52
4. "Una Ciudad Llamada Vacío" ("A City Called Emptiness") (Cianciarulo, Rotman) – 4:07
5. "Cadillacs" (Vicentico, Rigozzi, Cianciarulo) – 2:01
6. "Yo No Me Sentaría En Tu Mesa" ("I Wouldn't Sit At Your Table") (Vicentico, Pardo, Rotman) – 2:58
7. "Yo Te Avisé" ("I Told You So") (Vicentico) – 3:07
8. "Muy, Muy Temprano" ("Very, Very Early") (Cianciarulo, Vicentico) – 5:50
9. "Estoy Harto de Verte Con Otros" ("I'm Tired of Seeing You With Others") (Vicentico) – 4:53
10. "Aún los Escuchamos Cantar" ("We Can Still Hear Them Sing") (Cianciarulo, Ricciardi) – 4:37

=== Lost song ===
The original LP had an 11th track called "Siempre Me Hablaste de Ella" but due to a mistake in the production it missed the final product, but the lyrics were, also by mistake, included in the booklet; the song was released in the next album.

== Sales and certifications ==
Region	Certification	Certified units/sales
Argentina (CAPIF)	Platinum	60,000^{^}
^{^} Shipments figures based on certification alone.

== Personnel ==
- Vicentico – vocals
- Flavio Cianciarulo – bass
- Anibal Rigozzi – guitar
- Mario Siperman – keyboard
- Fernando Ricciardi – drums
- Luciano Giugno – percussion
- Naco Goldfinger – tenor saxophone
- Sergio Rotman – alto saxophone
- Daniel Lozano – trumpet & flugelhorn
