= Vox Dei (Thomas Scott) =

1623 pamphlet by Thomas Scott

frontespiece of the pamphlet showing Buckingham standing over "Briberie" and "Faction"

Vox Dei is a political-religious pamphlet by Thomas Scott published in Utrecht in 1623. The pamphlet contains an attack on the Spanish match, and ends by anticipating the triumph of the 1624 parliament.
