= El Satanico Dr. Cadillac =

Studio album by Los Fabulosos Cadillacs
- Released: 1989
- Recorded: September – October 1989
- Genre: Rock en español, ska, reggae
- Length: 36:17
- Label: CBS
- Producer: Los Fabulosos Cadillacs

Los Fabulosos Cadillacs chronology
| El Ritmo Mundial (1988) | El Satanico Dr. Cadillac (1989) | Volumen 5 (1990) |

El Satanico Dr. Cadillac (Spanish for The Satanic Dr. Cadillac) Released in 1989 is the fourth studio album from the Argentine Ska, reggae band Los Fabulosos Cadillacs.

In 1989, begins a period of creative downhill along with the economic crisis that Argentina was going through, this got reflected in sales and quality of production of this album.

The album's (and title track's) title come from the Spanish title for the James Bond film Dr. No, "El Satánico Dr. No" (The Satanic Dr. No).

== Reception ==
The Allmusic review by Victor W. Valdivia awarded the album 2.5 stars stating "The Cadillacs are still not quite more than the sum of their influences (except on the standout title track), but they are developing a distinctive style that would flourish on later releases".

Professional ratings
Review scores
| Source | Rating |
|---|---|
| Allmusic | 2.5/5 stars |

== Track listing ==
1. "El Satánico Dr. Cadillac" ("The Satanic Dr. Cadillac") (Vicentico) – 4:00
2. "El Mensaje Soy Yo" ("The Message is Me") (Vicentico) – 2:20
3. "Chico Perdido" ("Lost Boy") (Vicentico, Flavio Cianciarulo) – 3:50
4. "Mi Nombre Es Travis" ("My Name is Travis") (Flavio Cianciarulo, Vicentico, Sergio Rotman) – 3:50
5. "El Golpe de Tu Corazón" ("The Punch of Your Heart") (Cianciarulo, Vicentico) – 4:10
6. "Contrabando de Amor" ("Smuggling of love") (Vicentico) – 3:27
7. "Fiebre '90" ("Fever '90") (Vicentico, Cianciarulo, Rotman) – 4:23
8. "Rudy (Un Mensaje Para Vos)" ("Rudy (A message to you)") (R. Thompson) – 2:22
9. "El Sonido Joven de América" ("The Young Sound of America") (Cianciarulo) – 2:45
10. "Todas las Cosas Que Ella Me Dio" ("All the Things That She Gave Me") (Siperman, Vicentico, Rotman) – 3:35
11. "Verano Salvaje" ("Savage Summer") (Cianciarulo, Vicentico) – 3:05

== Personnel ==
- Vicentico – vocals
- Flavio Cianciarulo — bass
- Anibal Rigozzi – guitar
- Mario Siperman – keyboard
- Fernando Ricciardi – drums
- Luciano Giugno – percussion
- Naco Goldfinger – tenor saxophone
- Sergio Rotman – alto saxophone
- Daniel Lozano – trumpet & flugelhorn
