= Alles was war =

Single by Die Toten Hosen

from the album In aller Stille
- Released: February 20, 2009
- Genre: Alternative rock
- Length: 3:05 (album version); 3:12 (single edit)
- Label: JKP
- Songwriter(s): Andreas Frege; Michael Breitkopf

Die Toten Hosen singles chronology
"Strom" (2008)	"Alles was war" (2009)	"Auflösen" (2009)

"Alles was war" (All that was) is a song by Die Toten Hosen. It is the second single and the eighth track from the album In aller Stille. The release was initially planned for February 27, 2009, but moved to February 20. This song was chosen for the second single, because it became clear on the machmalauter-tour, that this is one of the fan favourites.

The song is a generally a hymn about nostalgia and how one should not regret what has been done and what has not been.

It peaked at #9 at the German Single Charts.

== Music video ==
The video premiered on Sevenload.com on February 6. It features touring footage - concerts, bus rides, preparing the stage etc.

== Track listing ==
1. "Alles was war" (Single Edit) - 3:12
2. "Kaufen geh'n" (Going shopping) (Breitkopf/Frege) - 2:57
3. "Sorgen um Thomas" (Worries about Thomas) (von Holst/Frege) - 3:01
4. "What's So Funny 'Bout Peace, Love and Understanding" (Nick Lowe) (Brinsley Schwarz cover; only at the iTunes Store)

== Charts ==
Year	Country	Position
2009	Germany	9
2009	Austria	60
