= Jessy Bulbo =

Mexican singer and bassist

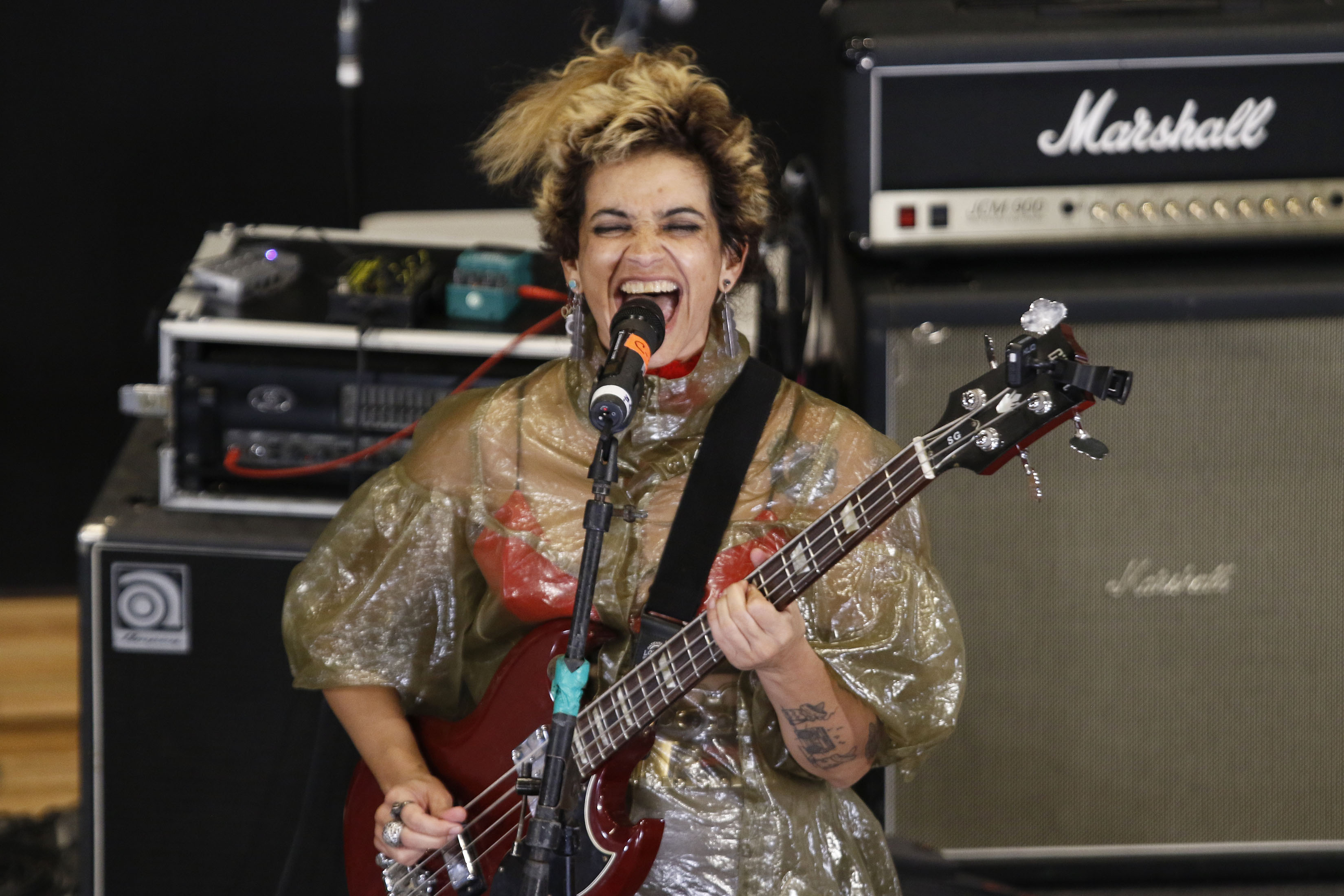
- Jessy Bulbo in 2021

Background information
- Born: Jessica Araceli Carrillo Cuevas; 10 October 1974 (age 52)
- Origin: Mexico City, Mexico
- Genres: Punk rock, indie rock, alternative rock
- Occupations: Singer, songwriter
- Instruments: Voice, bass guitar
- Years active: 1996–present
- Labels: Nuevos Ricos/EMI (2006–2008); Grabaxxiones Alicia (2010); Masare Records (2015)
- Website: instagram.com/jessybulbooficial

Jessy Bulbo (born Jessica Araceli Carrillo Cuevas on 10 October 1974 in Mexico City) is a Mexican singer, bassist and composer, commonly associated with the riot grrrl movement.

Jessy began her career around the turn of the century in the punk rock band Las Ultrasónicas, in which she sang and played the bass. Later, she started a solo career. After leaving the group in the early 2000s, she released her first solo single, "Maldito", in 2006. The song was featured in East Los FM, one of the fictional radio stations in the 2013 action-adventure game Grand Theft Auto V.

== Early life ==
Bulbo was born at the Hospital Fernando Quiroz in Álvaro Obregón, Mexico City and grew up in Tlalnepantla de Baz. Her parents were young activists who, due to her mother's pregnancy of her eldest brother, left a demonstration early and escaped the Tlatelolco massacre. Her mother, a Marxist and Sociology undergraduate at Universidad Autónoma Metropolitana, raised her and her three brothers under equal conditions. She recalls feeling discriminated against at school for her non-religious upbringing.

Bulbo wanted to be a dancer, but went to Journalism School at National Autonomous University of Mexico. Around the age of 17, she started attending live shows, and in one of them, she met Carlos Pérez, bassist of Los Psicóticos, with whom she became engaged. He encouraged her to play the bass and introduced her to other punk and garage bands. She eventually dropped out of college amidst a general strike in the institution.

Also, when she was 17, her parents divorced. Her mother would later move to California, and her father became an economist for the federal government.

== Career ==
=== Las Ultrasónicas ===
As she got to know different bands, she was introduced to Tere Farsissa and Ali Gua-Gua, who invited her to their newly formed band Las Ultrasónicas in 1996.

As she joined the band, she adopted the nickname "Bulbo" ("bulb" in Spanish) due to her obsession with valve amplifiers, which often had bulb-like tubes.

In 2000, the band went on hiatus, and Bulbo went to Xalapa, where she formed Bulbo Raquídeo. The following year, she returned to Mexico City to record Oh sí, más más!!! with Las Ultrasónicas, but left the group the year after, in November, following several conflicts and arguments.

=== Solo career ===
==== First solo works: Saga Mama, Taras Bulba (2001-2010) ====
Bulbo considered going solo after leaving the group, but she felt unmotivated and fell into depression. After recovering, she started attending shows again and in one of them, she met Alexis Ruiz, vibraphonist of Pathé de Fuá, and started working on musical ideas with him.

Ruiz encouraged her to resume her musical career, and they formed a duo named Bulberizer, which later changed its name to Jessy Bulbo y La Chen-Chachón until she started using only her name in 2006. The group's line-up was completed with Aarón Bautista (guitar, keyboards), Damián Pérez (guitar, drums), and Héctor Salazar (organs and effects).

After signing with Nuevos Ricos, she released her first demo, "Maldito", and later (2007) released her debut solo album, Saga Mama, with distribution by EMI.

In 2008, she released her second effort, Taras Bulba, also with Nuevos Ricos. She then switched for Grabaxxiones Alicia and in 2010 she released her third solo album, Telememe + Greatest Tits, a double album featuring new material (Telememe) and a compilation (Greatest Tits). Telememe was preceded by the Chava Flores-inspired, ranchera single "La Cruda Moral".

==== Further albums (2010-) ====
In 2011, she guest performed on "Dolor en los huevos", a song off Conejo en el sombrero by La Gusana Ciega; and "Buenas chambas", off Veo Muertos's Huele fresa.

In 2015, she released Changuenonium via Masare Records, exploring different Latin styles. She also guest performed again, this time on "Influenzombie", off El Monstruo son los Otros' Yo no soy el monstruo.

On 13 August 2020, she performed the first of a series of shows on rooftops around Mexico City to support independent artists that were affected by the COVID-19 pandemic.

== Other interests and works ==
In 2010, Bulbo starred in El lenguaje de los machetes, by Kytzia Terrazas, and wrote its original motion picture soundtrack. For her role, she was nominated for an Ariel Award for Best Actress.

She has also authored a book, Rock Doll, published by Ediciones B.

In 2017, Bulbo started nurturing an interest in baseball after watching the World Series. In 2021, she performed at Béisbal Rock!, a championship involving artists. She mostly plays as first basewoman.

== Personal life ==
As of 2012, Bulbo resides in San Miguel Chapultepec with her former drummer and current partner Alexis Ruiz.

== Discography ==
=== Studio albums ===
- Saga Mama (2007)
- Taras Bulba (2008)
- Telememe (2010)
- Changuemonium (2015)
