= Volumen 5 =

Studio album by Los Fabulosos Cadillacs
- Released: 1990
- Recorded: August – September, 1990
- Genre: Rock en español, ska
- Length: 33:33
- Label: Sony Music, Columbia

Los Fabulosos Cadillacs chronology
El Satanico Dr. Cadillac (1989)	Volumen 5 (1990)	Sopa de Caracol (1991)

Vol. 5 Released in 1990 is the fifth studio album from the Argentine Ska, Reggae band Los Fabulosos Cadillacs.

This album is fresh for the musical exigencies of the age and the one which gave the band access to the North American market, through a contract signed with the international producer Tommy Cookman.

== Track listing ==
1. "Los Olvidados" ("The forsaken") (Flavio Cianciarulo, Sergio Rotman) – 3:13
2. "Demasiada Presión" ("Too Much Pressure") (Vicentico) – 4:12
3. Te Extraño ("Miss You") (Mick Jagger, Keith Richards) – 4:39
4. "Radio Kriminal" (Vicentico, Cianciarulo) – 4:38
5. "Caballo de Madera" ("Wood Horse") (Cianciarulo) – 3:16
6. "Planeta Cero" ("Zero Planet") (Cianciarulo) – 3:23
7. "La Chica de los Ojos Café" ("Brown-eyed Girl) (Renato) – 4:21
8. "Electrasonic V" (Vicentico) – 2:16
9. "Tanto Como Un Dios" ("As Much as a God") (Vicentico) – 3:35

== Personnel ==
- Vicentico – vocals
- Flavio Cianciarulo – bass
- Anibal Rigozzi – guitar
- Mario Siperman – keyboards
- Fernando Ricciardi – drums
- Naco Goldfinger – tenor saxophone
- Sergio Rotman – alto saxophone
- Daniel Lozano – trumpet & flugelhorn
