= Personal Fest =

- Genre: Rock, Alternative rock, Indie rock, Dance, World music, Punk rock, Reggae, Folk music.
- Dates: Between October, November and December (2 days)
- Locations: (Argentina) Buenos Aires (Argentina) Cordoba (Paraguay) Asunción
- Years active: 2004–2009, 2011-2014, 2016-present
- Website: http://www.personalfest.com.ar/

Personal Fest was an Argentine music festival, held annually in Buenos Aires since 2004. It was named after its main sponsor, Personal. Six stages were set up at Club Ciudad de Buenos Aires. More than 55,000 persons attended in 2006 .

== 2004 festival ==
Acts appearing in 2004 included Massive Attack, Primal Scream, Blondie, Morrissey, Pet Shop Boys, PJ Harvey, The Mars Volta (featuring John Frusciante from the Red Hot Chili Peppers), Death in Vegas, rinôçérôse, Andy Smith, Electric Six, Goran Bregovic and others. Locals included Gustavo Cerati and others.

== 2005 festival ==
The 2005 festival included Duran Duran, who headlined the Saturday night performance. The Friday saw US pop-punk band Good Charlotte take the stage, followed by the legendary Scottish band Simple Minds. These edition also had performances by Macy Gray, Erykah Badu, The Crystal Method, Plastilina Mosh, Aterciopelados and others. Local bands Babasónicos, Catupecu Machu and Kevin Johansen were also featured.

== 2006 festival ==
The 2006 edition attracted approximately 55,000 people over two nights. Performances were divided between the Main Stage, the Personal Mania Stage and two smaller stages.

Acts performing this year included The Black Eyed Peas, New Order, Madness, Ian Brown, The Rasmus, The Bravery and Carlinhos Brown.

Argentinian acts included Arbol, La Portuaria, Emmanuel Horvilleur.

== 2007 festival ==
This edition, included Chris Cornell, Cypress Hill, Fischerspooner, Feist, CocoRosie, Datarock, Kid Koala, Calle 13, Happy Mondays, The Dandy Warhols, Cultura Profetica, Ed Motta, Gotan Project, Luis Alberto Spinetta, Monkey Business, Phoenix, Tego Calderón, Snoop Dogg, Los Cafres, Vicentico and Hot Chip.

== 2008 festival ==
This edition was held October 31 and November 1, 2008. Artists included Jesus & Mary Chain, Spiritualized, Bloc Party, The Offspring, Kaiser Chiefs, The Mars Volta, R.E.M. and many others.

== 2009 festival ==
This edition was held October 16 and October 17, 2009. October 16, 2009: : Pet Shop Boys, Nile Rodgers & Chic, Leo García, Estelares, Índica, Cuentos Borgeanos, Súper Ratones, Zero 7, Plastilina Mosh, Tahiti 80, Victoria Mil, Pat Coria y los Susceptibles and others. October 17, 2009: Depeche Mode, Justin Robertson, Banda de Turistas, Volador G, Café Tacuba, Spanish Bombs ( The Clash tribute), La Portuaria, No lo Soporto, Pánico Ramírez, RockHudson (RH+) and others.

== 2011 festival ==
After skipping a few years, Personal Fest is back for the 2011 edition to be held on October 2, November 4 and November 5, 2011. October 2 features Lenny Kravitz and Beto Cuevas. November 4 features The Strokes, Beady Eye, Goldfrapp, Broken Social Scene, White Lies and Toro y Moi. November 5 features INXS, Sonic Youth, Calle 13, Damian "Jr Gong" Marley, The Kills, La Mala Rodriguez and Francisca Valenzuela.

== Official Site ==
- Personal Fest.
