= Los Violadores =

Argentine rock band

- Also known as: Los Voladores
- Origin: Buenos Aires, Argentina
- Genres: Punk rock, hard rock, post punk
- Years active: 1980–1992; 1995–1996; 2000–2011; 2016–2019
- Labels: Umbral; CBS; Leader Music
- Members: Tucan; Carlos "El Niño" Khayatte; Sergio Gramatika; Sergio Vall
- Past members: Hari "B"; Robert "El Polaco" Zelazek; Gustavo "Stuka" Fossa; Adrian Blanco; Anel Paz; Pil Trafa

Los Violadores (Spanish: The Violators) is an Argentine punk rock band which pioneered the genre in Latin America.

== History ==
Los Violadores ("The Violators", referring to 'breaking the law', as mentioned in one of their songs, "Violadores de la Ley") was founded in Buenos Aires in 1980 by guitarist Hari "B" (born Pedro Braun). The rest of the band included Stuka (bass), Pil Trafa (vocals) and Sergio Gramatika (drums). In their first years, sometimes they had to perform under the name of Los Voladores ("The Flying Ones") because the censorship of the military government did not allow the original name of "Los Violadores".

After a while, Hari left the band and Stuka took his place at the guitar, with El Polaco taking on the bass; the latter was presumably a relative or an acquaintance of Hari B's. (El Polaco is Spanish for "the Pole". Hari was of Polish descent).

Their first hit was the song Represión ("Repression"), included on their first LP Los Violadores (1983), issued by the small label Umbral, and produced by Riff drummer Michel Peyronel. In 1985 the band released a second album entitled Y ahora qué pasa, eh?, including the song "Uno, dos, ultraviolento", a new hit which granted them considerable radio airplay.

By 1985 some tension began to grow within the band, caused by differences about the musical style between Pil Trafa and Stuka. Stuka wanted to incorporate some post-punk and gothic rock influences, favouring the sounds of acts such as The Cure and U2 (which finally materialized in their 1986 album Fuera de sektor). Singer Pil Trafa, on the other hand, wanted a more straightforward punk and heavier sound (evidenced in the 1987 album Mercado indio).

After some more albums released by CBS/Sony, such as Y que Dios nos perdone (1989) and Otro festival de la exageración (1991), they embarked on their farewell tour with young Argentine bands like Attaque 77 and 2 Minutos, ending in June of that year at the Estadio Obras Sanitarias in a gig with British punk legends U.K. Subs.

In late 1995 the band resumed its activity, they have reunited many times ever since, with different musicians, except singer Pil Trafa, who remained the only permanent member. With bassist "Polaco" Zelazek and Anel Paz substituting guitarist "Stuka", they recorded the album Otra patada en los huevos("Another kick to the balls"), performing some comeback shows of the band at Cemento Discotheque, in December 1995.

In 2000 Stuka rejoined the band but in 2003 left once again. Los Violadores have regained some popularity with their album Bajo un sol feliz (2006), and then participated in the festival 30 años de Punk, in 2009, with groups such as Cadena Perpetua and 2 Minutos, at Estadio Obras Sanitarias. That same year, the album Rey o reina was issued by means of Leader Music.

Los Violadores disbanded in May 2011, with the split announced by frontman Pil Trafa. In 2015, Pil Trafa announced the reunion of the band once again, this time with the classic line-up, including Stuka, Gramatika, and "Polaco" Zelazek, recording the double live CD Luna Punk: Rompan todo.

== Discography ==
=== Studio albums ===
- 1983 - Los Violadores
- 1985 - Y ahora qué pasa, eh?
- 1986 - Fuera de sektor
- 1987 - Mercado indio
- 1989 - Y que Dios nos perdone
- 1991 - Otro festival de la exageración
- 1996 - Otra patada en los huevos
- 2000 - Lo mejor de Los Violadores (re-recorded versions)
- 2006 - Bajo un sol feliz
- 2009 - Rey o reina

=== Live albums ===
- 1990 - En vivo y ruidoso
- 1996 - Histórico (La verdadera historia) 2 CD
- 2003 - En vivo y ruidoso II
- 2016 - Luna Punk: Rompan todo...

=== EPs ===
- 1986 - Uno, dos, ultravioladores
- 2004 - Y va... sangrando

=== Compilation albums ===
- 1992 - Grandes éxitos
- 2001 - Obras cumbres

== See also ==
- Latino punk
- Dirty War
