= Flavio Cianciarulo =

Argentine musician (born 1964)

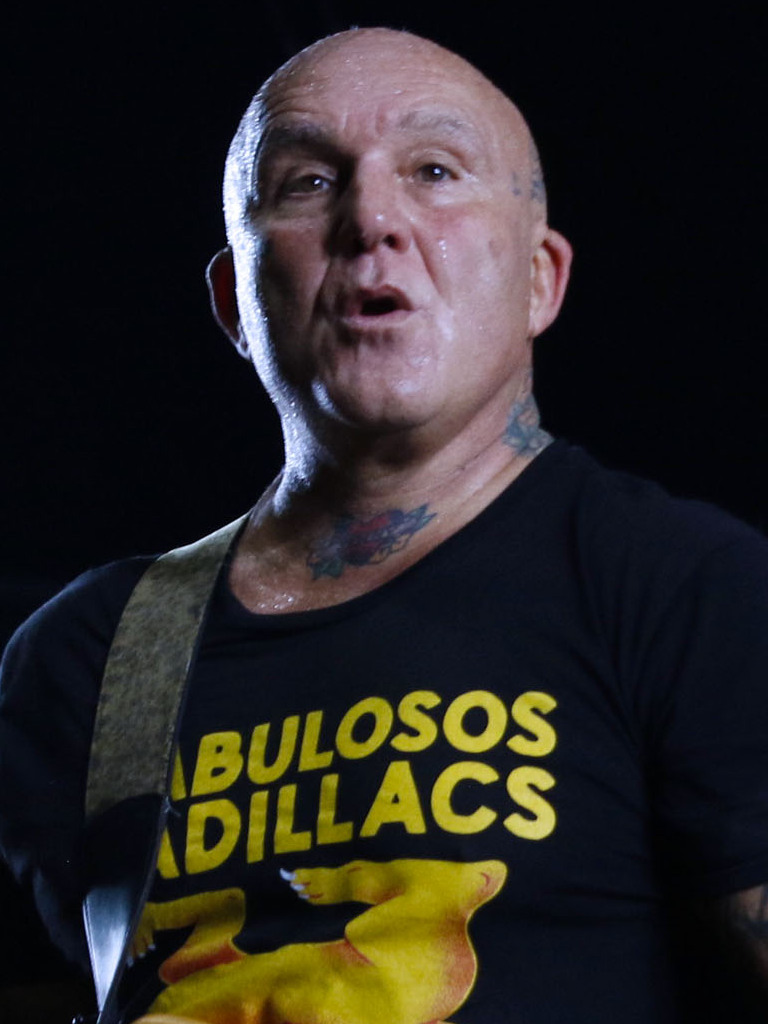
- Cianciarulo in 2023

Background information
- Born: Flavio Oscar Cianciarulo; July 26, 1964 (age 61)
- Genres: Jazz; rock; ska; reggae; groove metal; death metal
- Occupations: Musician; songwriter
- Instruments: Bass; upright bass; guitar; vocals
- Years active: 1985–present
- Website: www.flavioylamandinga.com.ar

Flavio Oscar Cianciarulo (born July 26, 1964), a.k.a. Sr. Flavio, is the electric and upright bass player from the reunited Argentine band Los Fabulosos Cadillacs and Latin American supergroup De La Tierra.

Sr. Flavio (as called by fans and members) has been the bass player from the beginning of the band when they were called Cadillac 57. He also sang many of the songs, and was one of the main songwriters of the band along with singer Vicentico.

After the unofficial separation of the band Sr. Flavio began a solo career, first with Flavio Calaveralma Trío and later with La Mandinga. He has also released a folklore and heavy metal album in collaboration with Ricardo Iorio and an album with Misterio, a band he formed with his son Astor (drums) and Nico Valle (upright bass). In 2012 he joined Latin American groove metal quartet De La Tierra with members of Sepultura, A.N.I.M.A.L. and Maná. In 2017, Sr. Flavio along with his sons Astor and Jay formed the death metal band Sotana and released their first album in 2018 called Secta del Acantilado.

== Solo albums ==
1. Flavio Solo, Viejo y Peludo (2001)
2. Welcome to Terror Dance [EP] (2006)
3. Nueva ola (2011)

=== Iorio-Flavio ===
1. Peso Argento (1997)

=== Flavio Calaveralma Trío ===
1. El marplatense (2003)

=== The Flavio Mandinga Project ===
1. Cachivache (2004, as Flavio y la Mandinga)
2. Sonidero (2005)
3. Supersaund 2012 (2007)

=== Misterio ===
1. Beat Zombie (2006)
