= Made Available: John Peel Sessions =

Compilation album by This Heat
- Released: 1996
- Recorded: 28 March 1977 (tracks: 1–3); 26 October 1977 (tracks: 4–8)
- Studio: Maida Vale Studios, BBC
- Genre: Experimental rock; post-punk; krautrock; avant-prog; musique concrete
- Length: 42:35
- Label: These Records (Catalog number: THESE 10 CD)
- Producer: Tony Wilson (tracks 1-3); Malcolm Brown (tracks 4-8)

Made Available: John Peel Sessions is a 1996 compilation of tracks by the band This Heat. Culled from two live John Peel Radio 1 sessions, the tracks were originally recorded and broadcast in 1977.

== Background ==
The band, formed in late 1976, recorded and sent their demo to Peel (the demo itself would go on to receive some airplay). Its cover was purposefully designed in "striking blue and yellow (used later on their debut LP), so it could be seen "without reading it, even in a pile" specifically for the benefit of John Peel and his producer John Waters [sic]". According to Bullen, "I phoned John Walters [...] once a week asking if he’d listened to it and then he eventually gave us our session. That was a great thing for us. [...] We did two in ’77 within a few months of one another, which was a bit unusual and I guess showed how much he loved the first one, but I think he found our second one a bit self indulgent and didn’t offer us another one after that.”

== Recording ==
The first session, produced by Tony Wilson, was recorded on 28 March 1977 and then first broadcast on 22 April 1977. The second session, produced by Malcolm Brown, was recorded on 26 October 1977 and then first broadcast on 24 November 1977. The sessions consisted of 3 and 5 tracks respectively (appearing in chronological order on this album).

== Release ==
The album was first released on LP through These Records. It was also issued on CD the same year by This Is (catalog number: this is 4). The aforementioned label also released it as a standard Digipak in 2006. In 2018, Modern Classics Recordings released the album as CD (catalog number: MCR926).

== Reception ==
Professional ratings
Review scores
Source	Rating
Allmusic	3/5 stars
Pitchfork	7.9/10
Popmatters	8/10 stars
Tiny Mix Tapes	4/5 stars
Uncut	8/10

After the sessions aired, John Peel "famously stated when asked by listeners to play 'more music like This Heat, that it would not be possible as nobody sounds quite like them'".

Made Available itself went on to receive very positive reviews, especially when it was reissued in 2006 (as part of the Out of Cold Storage box-set) and in 2018. Andy Kellman of Allmusic found the first session to contain "more gripping material. Charles Bullen's Twilight Zone theme guitar pluckings, circular ringing figures, distorted blasts, and fusion-y leads on "Horizontal Hold" are crystal clear, as are the frantic keyboards and organs from Gareth Williams and/or Charles Hayward." The second session "features the thrashy, jagged, off-kilter rhythms of "Rimp Romp Ramp," foreshadowing the more aggressive, disjointed sides of the Fall, Long Fin Killie, and Painkiller. "Makeshift"'s stream-of-consciousness blasts are neuron frying; the vocals sound like a high-pitched Brian Eno gone bananas." He criticized the closing 3 tracks as "patience-testing snippets based on freeform clarinet, piano, and noise." Pitchfork's Robert Ham writes that the album "reveals just how clear their collective vision was from the start." Seb of Tiny Mix Tapes expressed disbelief at the fact that the songs were recorded in 1977, calling it "literally timeless [...] Parallels could be drawn across the decades to the Velvet Underground’s narcotic haze, Eno’s billowy ambience, Albini’s clawhammer guitar, and Tricky’s dusty hip-hop dirges. But This Heat were more obtuse than any of the above. They jumped between genres, tempos, and instruments, more with nervous energy than schooled precision. Grindstone drones underline the songs like a bed of nails, prodding the vocals to convulse like Ian Curtis on helium. The sound is so tightly-wound it can only betray its paranoia." He called the album's version of "Horizontal Hold" as "either the precursor to post-rock, or Krautrock with a junkie’s itch", "The Fall of Saigon" as "one of the grimiest loops to ever grace tape" and "Makeshift" as "an angular epic that evokes King Crimson reborn with Public Image Ltd.’s metallic lurch." He concluded the review by calling the album "a genuinely unnerving experience — the ultimate in uneasy listening." Johnathan Dean of Brainwashed wrote that the Peel sessions "combin[es] fantastically possessed renditions of tracks from the debut album with an amazing one-off heavy prog number ("Rimp Romp Ramp") and a handful of puzzling avant-jazz sketches that never really go anywhere, but I'd happily take This Heat's toss-offs over most band's finest hours." Louis Pattison of Uncut described the tracks "Slither" and "Sitting" as exploring "an uneasy, claustrophobic improv of meandering tape loops and droning strings."

== Track listing ==
All tracks composed by This Heat; performed by Charles Hayward, Charles Bullen and Gareth Williams. Track list adapted from Discogs:

No.	Title	Length
1.	"Horizontal Hold"	8:27
2.	"Not Waving"	8:10
3.	"The Fall of Saigon"	6:08
4.	"Rimp Romp Ramp"	6:42
5.	"Makeshift"	6:17
6.	"Sitting"	2:21
7.	"Basement Boy"	2:15
8.	"Slither"	2:15
Total length:		42:35

== Personnel ==
- Charles Bullen - performer
- Charles Hayward - performer
- Gareth Williams - performer

== Credits ==
Adapted from Discogs:

- Cover Design – Andrew Jacques, Charles Hayward, James Mannox, Stephen Thrower, Sue Lawes
- Engineering – Dave Dade (tracks: 1 to 3), Nick Gomm (tracks: 4 to 8)
- Mastering – Dave Bernez, This Heat
- Other ["Curtains, Subdued Lighting"] – David Cunningham
- Photography – Hulton Deutsch collection
- Photography [band] – Unknown
