= Health and Efficiency (EP) =

EP by This Heat
- Released: 1980
- Studio: Cold Storage/Sorry Sound studios
- Genre: Experimental rock
- Length: 19:23
- Label: Piano
- Producer: David Cunningham

This Heat chronology
This Heat (1979)	Health and Efficiency (1980)	Deceit (1981)

Health and Efficiency is an EP by English experimental rock band This Heat. It was released in 1980 by record label Piano.

== Track listing ==
All music written and composed by This Heat (Charles Bullen, Charles Hayward, Gareth Williams).

Side one
No.	Title	Length
1.	"Health and Efficiency"	8:02

Side two
No.	Title	Length
1.	"Graphic/Varispeed"	11:21

== Critical reception ==
Professional ratings
Review scores
Source	Rating
AllMusic	3/5 stars
Pitchfork	8.8/10
Popmatters	9/10 stars
Uncut	9/10

Pitchfork called the EP "This Heat's masterpiece".

== Personnel ==
This Heat

- Charles Bullen
- Charles Hayward
- Gareth Williams

Additional personnel

- David Cunningham – production
- Chris Blake – engineering
- Chris Gray – engineering
- Geoffrey Zipper – engineering
- Jack Balchin – engineering
- Laurie-Rae Chamberlain – engineering
- Peter Bullen – engineering
- Phil Clarke – engineering
- Pete Cobb – sleeve artwork

== Charts ==
Chart (1980)	Peak position
UK Indie Chart	35
