= Deceit (album) =

Studio album by This Heat
- Released: September 1981
- Recorded: April–August 1981
- Studio: Cold Storage, Zipper Mobile, Mekon, Berry Street, Vineyard, and Nivelles in London; Surrey Sound in Surrey
- Genre: Experimental rock; post-punk
- Length: 39:50
- Label: Rough Trade
- Producer: This Heat; David Cunningham

This Heat chronology
Health and Efficiency (1980)	Deceit (1981)

Additional cover art
- The cover art (as shown in the 1991 CD booklet) reflected This Heat's anxiety about nuclear war.

Deceit is the second and final studio album by English experimental rock band This Heat, released in September 1981 by Rough Trade Records. As with their self-titled debut album, the tracks on Deceit were assembled from largely improvised recordings that the band accumulated since their inception in 1976, with varying degrees of audio quality. However, it is generally considered to be more song-oriented than its largely abstract predecessor. The title is in part a pun on the band's name.

Deceit is regarded as a classic of the post-punk era, and was ranked at number 73 on Pitchfork's 2018 list of "The 200 Best Albums of the 1980s".

== Background ==
Deceit was recorded between April and August 1981. As with previous This Heat recordings, much of the album was recorded in the band's own Cold Storage, a disused refrigerated storeroom at a former meat pie factory in Acre Lane, Brixton, England. The music included new improvisations along with songs the band had been playing during live performances; portions of these songs were culled from actual concert recordings, such as "Makeshift Swahili", which was assembled from three different performances. As drummer Charles Hayward describes, "some of the album was really plush sounding, some dim and pokey. Sometimes it would sound like the machinery was breaking up. We deliberately would make it sound as though the record player was exploding." (Note: The source text actually reads "record played", but this is assumed to be a typographical error.)

In a 1991 interview, Hayward explained that the threat of nuclear warfare motivated the band and provided the album with an underlying theme: "The whole speak, 'Little Boy', 'Big Boy' [sic], calling missiles cute little names. The whole period was mad! We had a firm belief that we were going to die and the record was made on those terms.... The whole thing was designed to express this sort of fear, angst, which the group was all about, really." The album's subject matter also deals with war and imperialism.

== Artwork ==
The cover art for Deceit, designed by bandmember Gareth Williams and Nicholas Goodall in collaboration with Xerox artist Laurie-Rae Chamberlain, reflects the album's lyrical concerns, and includes a photomontage of images such as mushroom clouds, thematic maps depicting nuclear arsenals and photographs of Ronald Reagan, Leonid Brezhnev and Nikita Khrushchev. Charles Hayward explained that the album's cover photograph was achieved by using cut-out images from a Protect and Survive pamphlet, which were then assembled into a mask shape, photographed and projected over Williams' face.

== Release ==
During the 1990s, intermittent availability made Deceit a rarity and a collector's item among fans. In 2006, This Is, a Recommended Records imprint, released a remastered version of Deceit as part of the 6-CD Out of Cold Storage box set. This Is also released the album as a separately available CD. In January 2016, Light in the Attic imprint Modern Classics Recordings pressed remastered reissues of Deceit, This Heat, and Health and Efficiency on vinyl.

== Critical reception and legacy ==
Professional ratings
Review scores
Source	Rating
AllMusic	4.5/5 stars
The Great Alternative & Indie Discography	7/10
Metal.de	9/10
Pitchfork	9.0/10 (2002); 9.1/10 (2016)
PopMatters	9/10
Select	5/5 stars
Uncut	9/10

Although Deceit was not commercially successful, it has been well received by critics. Andy Kellman of AllMusic wrote of the album: "Out of all the boundary breaking that occurred during the fertile era of post-punk, This Heat's Deceit is one of the most expansive, imaginative and remarkably wild records to have been produced during the time—and very possibly the last three decades." The Trouser Press Record Guide described the album as "austere, brilliant and indescribable." Miles Bowe of Tiny Mix Tapes called it a "radiation-soaked masterpiece", while Select magazine's Dave Morrison wrote that it "stands as a phenomenal achievement, opening up avenues yet to be explored." In a retrospective feature on This Heat in the October 1998 issue of Record Collector, Ian Shirley called Deceit "a mature collection of songs" that displays "a fantastic grasp of dynamics, rhythm, tempo, and the full exploitation of the recording studio and mixing techniques".

Deceit is regarded as a classic of the post-punk era, and was ranked at number 20 on Pitchfork's 2002 list of "The Top 100 Albums of the 1980s" and at number 73 on its 2018 list of "The 200 Best Albums of the 1980s". In 2011, Hot Chip frontman Alexis Taylor, who has frequently collaborated with Hayward, selected Deceit as part of NME's The 100 Greatest Albums You've Never Heard issue.

== Track listing ==
All tracks are written by This Heat (Charles Hayward, Gareth Williams, Charles Bullen).

No.	Title	Length
1.	"Sleep"	2:13
2.	"Paper Hats"	5:57
3.	"Triumph"	2:55
4.	"S.P.Q.R."	3:26
5.	"Cenotaph"	4:35
6.	"Shrink Wrap"	1:40
7.	"Radio Prague"	2:21
8.	"Makeshift Swahili"	4:04
9.	"Independence"	3:39
10.	"A New Kind of Water"	4:57
11.	"Hi Baku Shyo 被爆症 (Suffer Bomb Disease)"	4:03
Total length:		39:50

== Personnel ==
This Heat

- Charles Hayward – vocals, drums, keyboards, guitar, bass, tapes
- Gareth Williams – vocals, bass, keyboards, tape
- Charles Bullen – vocals, guitar, clarinet, drums, tape

Production

- David Cunningham – production
- Martin Frederick – mixing
- Laurie-Rae Chamberlain – colour xerography
- Nicholas Goodall – sleeve photography direction
- Studio 54 – sleeve design

== Charts ==
Chart (1981)	Peak position
UK Independent Albums (MRIB)	17
