= The Flying Lizards (album) =

Studio album by The Flying Lizards
- Released: February 1980
- Recorded: 1978–1979
- Studios: Berry Street Studio and Brixton Academy additional recordings in NYC, Munich, Maidstone and in transit
- Length: 42:07
- Label: Virgin
- Producer: David Cunningham

The Flying Lizards chronology
The Flying Lizards (1980)	Fourth Wall (1981)

Professional ratings
Review scores
Source	Rating
Allmusic	3/5 stars
Record Mirror	3/5 stars
Smash Hits	7½/10

The Flying Lizards is the 1980 debut album by The Flying Lizards and was released on the Virgin Records label.

Preceded by two surprise hit singles, the album reached No. 60 in the UK Albums Chart.

The front cover was designed by Laurie-Rae Chamberlain, Richard Rayner-Canham and David Cunningham. It partially shows the first page of Roland Barthes's essay "Musica Practica", translated by Stephen Heath.

== Background ==
Following the unexpected success of the group's 1979 singles—covers of "Summertime Blues" and "Money"—David Cunningham and Deborah Evans were offered a deal with Virgin Records. New material for the album featured improvisational musicians Steve Beresford and David Toop.

The album encompasses "dub-style audio experiments" and "bent interpretations of pop music constructs." Critic Simon Reynolds called it "an exercise in pop absurdism" which included "a Brecht-Weill cover, Sanskrit chants, found sounds, and unlikely instrumental textures" alongside "Cunningham's penchant for excessive studio processing and daft effects."

The album was released in Australia on 7 Records MLF 349.

== Track list ==
=== 1980 release ===
All tracks by David Cunningham except as noted

1. "Der Song von Mandelay" (titled "Mandelay Song" on UK release) (Bertolt Brecht, Kurt Weill) - 2:27
2. "Her Story" (Dave Solomon, David Cunningham, General-Strike, Vivien Goldman) - 4:37
3. "TV" (David Cunningham, Deborah Evans-Stickland, General-Strike) - 3:51
4. "Russia" - 6:11
5. "Summertime Blues" (Eddie Cochran, Jerry Capehart) - 3:09
6. "Money (That's What I Want)" (Berry Gordy, Janie Bradford) - 5:52
7. "The Flood" - 4:57
8. "Trouble" - 2:46
9. "Events During Flood" - 3:25
10. "The Window" (Vivien Goldman) - 4:52

=== Bonus tracks on 1995 CD ===
11. "All Guitars" ("Summertime Blues" single B-side) - 2:41
12. "Tube" (instrumental remix of "TV" - B side of "TV" single) - 5:09
13. "Money (That's What I Want)" (single edit) - 2:32

General Strike are David Toop and Steve Beresford, who also made the album Danger In Paradise with David Cunningham in the years 1979-1982

== Personnel ==
- David Cunningham
- David Toop
- Steve Beresford
- Michael Upton
- Deborah Evans-Stickland
- Vivien Goldman
- Julian Marshall

== Charts ==
Chart (1980)	Peak position
Australian (Kent Music Report)	37
United Kingdom UK Albums Chart	60
New Zealand Official New Zealand Music Chart	28
US Billboard 200	99
