= Killing Time (Massacre album) =

Studio album by Massacre
- Released: September 1981
- Recorded: April 1981 live at 24 rue Dunois, Paris, France; June 1981 at OAO studio, Brooklyn, New York City
- Genre: No wave, experimental rock, math rock, avant-prog
- Length: 45:43
- Label: Celluloid
- Producer: Fred Frith

Massacre chronology
Killing Time (1981)	Funny Valentine (1998)

Killing Time is the debut album by American experimental rock trio Massacre. It was released in September 1981, through record label Celluloid. It consists of a compilation of recordings made at Martin Bisi's OAO studio in Brooklyn, New York City in June 1981, and live recordings taken from their April 1981 Paris concerts. The group disbanded shortly after, eventually reforming 17 years later with Charles Hayward replacing Maher on drums. They recorded one more studio album and three live albums for John Zorn’s Tzadik Records. Killing Time was generally well received by critics of the time.

== Critical reception ==
Professional ratings
Review scores
Source	Rating
AllMusic	4.5/5 stars
BBC	Favorable
DownBeat	4.5/5 stars
Dusted Reviews	Favorable
Christgau's Record Guide	B+
Pitchfork	8.2/10

AllMusic called it "one of the most obscure and most wonderful" albums to come out of the early 1980s downtown avant-garde scene. Pitchfork Media opined that it "belongs in a pretty select group of great, instrumental avant-rock albums". A BBC review describe Massacre as "an unholy union of The Shadows, Captain Beefheart, Derek Bailey and Funkadelic", and called Killing Time "genius".

Howard Mandel wrote in a review in DownBeat that on Killing Time Massacre show that they are as "aggressive" as their name, and "more purposeful" than their debut album's title. He said they manage their "tight trio stop-times as though their foreboding sound was as natural as bebop". Mandel concluded that Maher is "solid", Laswell "flexible and alert", and Frith "possessed by electric possibilities", and added that "[t]hey're convinced of what they're up to, and that certainty leaps from the grooves."

In a review of the 2005 CD re-issue of the album in the music journal Notes, Rick Anderson said that "[the] music remains as fresh and exciting today as it was 25 years ago, and is a vital document of a wonderful and all-too-brief period in New York's musical history".

FACT ranked it the 26th best album of the 1980s, calling it "a furiously addictive brand of semi-improvised, nitro-enhanced instrumental rock – a path Ruins and Battles would duly troop down decades later."

== Re-issue ==
Killing Time was re-issued on RecRec Music in 1993 with six extra tracks, and on Fred Records in 2005 with eight extra tracks, including a cover of "F.B.I." by the Shadows. The Fred Records re-issue is a re-mastered copy of the 1982 Japanese release on Recommended Records Japan. It also corrected the original LP's tracks so as to be heard as originally intended, namely "at the correct speed and pitch and without added reverb" which had been altered by a "meddling engineer".

In 2016, RēR Megacorp re-issued Killing Time on a three-sided double-LP. Sides A and B contains the original LP release with the sound corrected as featured on the Fred Records release. Side C contains all the extra tracks that appeared on the Fred Records CD.

== Track listing ==
All tracks written by Massacre, except as noted.

=== 1981 LP release ===
Side one
No.	Title	Recorded	Length
1.	"Legs"	OAO Studio, Brooklyn, New York City, June 1981	2:04
2.	"Aging with Dignity"	OAO Studio, June 1981	3:06
3.	"Subway Heart"	Live at 24 Rue Dunois, Paris, April 1981	2:45
4.	"Killing Time"	OAO Studio, June 1981	2:54
5.	"Corridor"	Live at 24 Rue Dunois, April 1981	1:58
6.	"Lost Causes"	Live at 24 Rue Dunois, April 1981	3:15
7.	"Not the Person We Knew"	Live at 24 Rue Dunois, April 1981	3:17

Side two
No.	Title	Recorded	Length
1.	"Bones"	OAO Studio, June 1981	1:41
2.	"Tourism"	Live at 24 Rue Dunois, April 1981	4:12
3.	"Surfing"	OAO Studio, June 1981	1:15
4.	"As Is"	Live at 24 Rue Dunois, April 1981	8:06
5.	"After"	Live at 24 Rue Dunois, April 1981	5:01
6.	"Gate"	OAO Studio, June 1981	2:38

=== 1993 CD re-issue ===
No.	Title	Recorded	Length
1.	"You Said"	Inroads, New York City, July 1981 ♯	1:47
2.	"Legs"	OAO Studio, June 1981	2:04
3.	"Aging with Dignity"	OAO Studio, June 1981	3:02
4.	"Subway Heart"	Live at 24 Rue Dunois, April 1981	2:45
5.	"Killing Time"	OAO Studio, June 1981	2:51
6.	"Corridor / Lost Causes / Not the Person We Knew"	Live at 24 Rue Dunois, April 1981	8:32
7.	"Know"	Live at 24 Rue Dunois, April 1981 ♯	2:16
8.	"Bones"	OAO Studio, June 1981	1:39
9.	"Tourism"	Live at 24 Rue Dunois, April 1981	4:12
10.	"Surfing"	OAO Studio, June 1981	1:13
11.	"As Is"	Live at 24 Rue Dunois, April 1981	8:06
12.	"After"	Live at 24 Rue Dunois, April 1981	5:02
13.	"Gate"	OAO Studion, June 1981	2:41
14.	"Conversations with White Arc"	Live at CBGB, New York City, April 1980 ♯	1:15
15.	"Carrying"	Live at 24 Rue Dunois, April 1981 ♯	1:43
16.	"Bait"	Inroads, July 1981 ♯	2:02
17.	"3 O'Clock, June 21st, Get Down There and Do It"	Stone Club, San Francisco, June 1981 ♯	1:35

=== 2005 CD re-issue ===
No.	Title	Recorded	Length
1.	"You Said"	Inroads, July 1981 ♯	1:47
2.	"Legs"	OAO Studio, June 1981	2:04
3.	"Aging with Dignity"	OAO Studio, June 1981	3:02
4.	"Subway Heart"	Live at 24 Rue Dunois, April 1981	2:45
5.	"Killing Time"	OAO Studio, June 1981	2:51
6.	"Corridor / Lost Causes / Not the Person We Knew"	Live at 24 Rue Dunois, April 1981	8:32
7.	"Know"	Live at 24 Rue Dunois, April 1981 ♯	2:16
8.	"Bones"	OAO Studio, June 1981	1:39
9.	"Tourism"	Live at 24 Rue Dunois, April 1981	4:12
10.	"Surfing"	OAO Studio, June 1981	1:13
11.	"As Is"	Live at 24 Rue Dunois, April 1981	8:06
12.	"After"	Live at 24 Rue Dunois, April 1981	5:02
13.	"Gate"	OAO Studio, June 1981	2:41
14.	"Conversations with White Arc"	Live at CBGB, April 1980 ♯	1:15
15.	"Carrying"	Live at 24 Rue Dunois, April 1981 ♯	1:43
16.	"Bait"	Inroads, July 1981 ♯	2:02
17.	"Third Street"	Live at 24 Rue Dunois, April 1981 ♯	4:21
18.	"3 O'Clock, June 21st, Get Down There and Do It"	Stone Club, June 1981 ♯	1:35
19.	"F.B.I." (Welsch, Marvin, Harris; arranged by Massacre)	Live at 24 Rue Dunois, April 1981 ♯	3:10

=== 2016 double-LP release ===
Side A
No.	Title	Recorded	Length
1.	"Legs"	OAO Studio, Brooklyn, New York City, June 1981	2:04
2.	"Aging with Dignity"	OAO Studio, June 1981	3:06
3.	"Subway Heart"	Live at 24 Rue Dunois, Paris, April 1981	2:45
4.	"Killing Time"	OAO Studio, June 1981	2:54
5.	"Corridor"	Live at 24 Rue Dunois, April 1981	1:58
6.	"Lost Causes"	Live at 24 Rue Dunois, April 1981	3:15
7.	"Not the Person We Knew"	Live at 24 Rue Dunois, April 1981	3:17

Side B
No.	Title	Recorded	Length
1.	"Bones"	OAO Studio, June 1981	1:41
2.	"Tourism"	Live at 24 Rue Dunois, April 1981	4:12
3.	"Surfing"	OAO Studio, June 1981	1:15
4.	"As Is"	Live at 24 Rue Dunois, April 1981	8:06
5.	"After"	Live at 24 Rue Dunois, April 1981	5:01
6.	"Gate"	OAO Studio, June 1981	2:38

Side C
No.	Title	Recorded	Length
1.	"You Said"	Inroads, July 1981 ♯	1:47
2.	"Know"	Live at 24 Rue Dunois, April 1981 ♯	2:16
3.	"Conversations with White Arc"	Live at CBGB, April 1980 ♯	1:15
4.	"Carrying"	Live at 24 Rue Dunois, April 1981 ♯	1:43
5.	"Bait"	Inroads, July 1981 ♯	2:02
6.	"Third Street"	Live at 24 Rue Dunois, April 1981 ♯	4:21
7.	"3 O'Clock, June 21st, Get Down There and Do It"	Stone Club, June 1981 ♯	1:35
8.	"F.B.I." (Welsch, Marvin, Harris; arranged by Massacre)	Live at 24 Rue Dunois, April 1981 ♯	3:10

- ♯ denotes bonus tracks
- "Conversations with White Arc" originally appeared on Fred Frith's solo album Speechless (1981)

== Personnel ==
Massacre

- Fred Frith – Burns Black Bison guitar, Casio, radio, voice, WW II pilot's throat microphone
- Bill Laswell – 4- and 6-string bass guitars, pocket trumpet
- Fred Maher – drums, percussion

Technical

- Martin Bisi – engineering (New York)
- Jean-Marc Foussat – engineering (Paris)
- Greg Curry – engineering (additional tape work)
- Tina Curran – original LP cover photography
- Thi-Linh Le – original LP cover photography and sleeve design
- Jan Luss – original sleeve design
