= Money (That's What I Want) =

1959 single by Barrett Strong

Single by Barrett Strong
- B-side: "Oh I Apologize"
- Released: August 1959
- Studio: Hitsville studio A (Detroit)
- Genre: Rhythm and blues
- Length: 2:39
- Label: Tamla; Anna
- Songwriters: Janie Bradford; Berry Gordy

Barrett Strong singles chronology
"Let's Rock" (1959)	"Money (That's What I Want)" (1959)	"Yes, No Maybe So" (1960)

Official audio
- "Money (That's What I Want)" on YouTube

"Money (That's What I Want)" is a rhythm and blues song written by Tamla founder Berry Gordy and Janie Bradford, which was the first hit record for Gordy's Motown enterprise. Barrett Strong recorded it in 1959 as a single for the Tamla label, distributed nationally on Anna Records. Many artists later covered the song, including the Beatles in 1963 and the Flying Lizards in 1979.

== Composition and recording ==
The song developed out of a spontaneous recording session at the Hitsville studio A in Detroit. Berry Gordy and Barrett Strong began by improvising on piano and vocals and were joined by Benny Benjamin on drums and Brian Holland on tambourine. It is a response song to the standard The Best Things in Life Are Free. Authors Jim Cogan and William Clark only identify the guitarist and bass guitarist as "two white kids walking home from high school [who] heard the music out on the street and wandered in to Hitsville [and] asked if they could play along." They add, "Strong claimed he never saw the two boys who played bass and guitar again." However, the guitarist has also been identified as Eugene Grew, who claimed that Strong showed him what to play.

Strong begins with a bluesy piano riff, with the rest of the instruments gradually falling in. The figure is a key element of the song and is repeated throughout the piece by the piano, bass guitar and guitar, with background vocals by the Rayber Voices. Author Nick Talevski calls the song an "R&B classic" and it is identified as having a "Detroit R&B sound" by Mark Lewisohn. Music journalist Charles Shaar Murray describes "Money" as "one of the earliest Motown classics from the days when the label left some of R&B's rough edges in place."

When the song was only half-finished, Gordy played the song to Janie Bradford, who was at that time working as a receptionist at Motown. Bradford responded jokingly with the words: "Your love gives me such a thrill/ But your love don’t pay my bills/ Gimme some money, baby." Gordy loved her response, added it to the song and thought it the best verse in the song. Because of that, he gave her 50% credit in writing the song.

== Releases ==
The song was originally recorded by Barrett Strong and released on Tamla in August 1959. Anna Records was operated by Gwen Gordy, Anna Gordy and Roquel "Billy" Davis. Gwen and Anna's brother Berry Gordy had just established his Tamla label (soon Motown would follow) and licensed the song to the Anna label in 1960, which was distributed nationwide by Chicago-based Chess Records in order to meet demand; the Tamla record was a resounding success in the Midwestern United States.

In the US, the single became Motown's first hit in June 1960, making it to number two on the Hot R&B Sides chart and number 23 on the Billboard Hot 100. The song was listed as number 288 on Rolling Stone's "The 500 Greatest Songs of All Time". Greil Marcus has pointed out that "Money" was the only song that brought Strong's name near the top of the national music charts, "but that one time has kept him on the radio all his life."

== Personnel ==
Personnel included:

- Barrett Strong – vocals
- Berry Gordy – piano
- Benny Benjamin – drums
- Eugene Grew – guitar
- Brian Holland – tambourine

(Bassist on recording is unknown)

== Writing credits dispute ==
Singer Barrett Strong claimed that he co-wrote the song with Berry Gordy and Janie Bradford. His name was removed from the copyright registration three years after the song was written, restored in 1987 when the copyright was renewed, and then excised again the following year. Gordy said that Strong's name was only included because of a clerical error.

== The Beatles version ==
"Money (That's What I Want)"
- Sheet music cover

Song by the Beatles

from the album With the Beatles
- Released: November 22, 1963 (UK: With the Beatles); April 10, 1964 (US: The Beatles' Second Album)
- Recorded: July 18, 1963
- Studio: EMI, London
- Genre: Rock and roll
- Length: 2:47
- Label: Parlophone (UK); Capitol (US)
- Songwriters: Janie Bradford; Berry Gordy
- Producer: George Martin

Audio sample
- 19 seconds with refrain: file; help

=== Recording ===
The Beatles recorded "Money" in seven takes on July 18, 1963. A series of piano overdubs was later added by producer George Martin. The song was released in November 1963 as the final track on their second UK album With the Beatles and subsequently released in the US in April 1964 when it was included on The Beatles' Second Album.

According to George Harrison, the group discovered Strong's version in Brian Epstein's NEMS record store (though not a hit in the UK, it had been issued on London Records in 1960). They had previously performed it during their audition at Decca Records on January 1, 1962, with Pete Best still on drums at the time. They also recorded it six times for BBC radio. A live version, taped at a concert date in Stockholm, Sweden, in October 1963, was included on Anthology 1.

In 2018, the music staff of Time Out London ranked "Money (That's What I Want)" at number 25 on their list of the best Beatles songs.

=== Personnel ===
According to Neville Stannard:

- John Lennon – vocals, rhythm guitar
- Paul McCartney – backing vocals, bass
- George Harrison – backing vocals, lead guitar
- Ringo Starr – drums
- George Martin – piano

== The Flying Lizards version ==
"Money"

Single by the Flying Lizards

from the album The Flying Lizards
- B-side: "Money B"
- Released: July 13, 1979
- Genre: New wave; no wave
- Length: 2:31
- Label: Virgin
- Songwriters: Janie Bradford; Berry Gordy
- Producer: David Cunningham

The Flying Lizards singles chronology
"Summertime Blues" (1978)	"Money" (1979)	"TV" (1980)

Official video
- "Money" on YouTube

In July 1979, British band the Flying Lizards released a new wave version of the song, as a single and on their first album, The Flying Lizards. An unexpected hit, this version peaked at number 5 on the UK chart and at number 50 on the Billboard Hot 100. It also peaked at number 22 on the US Dance chart.

It was released in Australia on 7 Records MS 368 in 1979.

=== Chart performance ===
==== Weekly charts ====
Chart (1979–1980)	Peak position
Australia (Kent Music Report)	11
Austria (Ö3 Austria Top 40)	23
Belgium (Ultratop 50 Flanders)	28
Canada Top Singles (RPM)	7
France (IFOP)	39
Netherlands (Dutch Top 40)	33
Netherlands (Single Top 100)	37
New Zealand (Recorded Music NZ)	5
UK Singles (Official Charts)	5
US Billboard Hot 100	50
US Billboard Hot Dance Club Play	22
US Cash Box	34

==== Year-end charts ====
Chart (1980)	Position
Australia (Kent Music Report)	71
Canada (RPM Top Singles)	59
New Zealand (Recorded Music NZ)	32

== Other versions ==
The song has been covered by many artists, with several of the versions appearing in a variety of charts.

In 1964, a single by the Kingsmen from their album The Kingsmen In Person reached No. 16 on the Billboard Hot 100, No. 6 on the US R&B charts, and No. 24 in Canada in 1964. A version by Jennell Hawkins reached No. 17 in the R&B charts in 1962. Junior Walker & the All Stars' cover from their album Road Runner reached No. 52 on the Hot 100 and number 35 on the R&B charts in 1966 and Bern Elliott and the Fenmen reached No. 14 on the UK Singles Chart in November 1963. The song was also a staple for British beat bands.

Charli XCX released a cover of the song as a bonus track on her album, Sucker (2014).
