= Maria Lamburn =

- Born: Maria Lamburn; 26 November 1960 (age 65); Dulwich, London, England
- Origin: Welsh mother, English father
- Occupations: Composer, multi instrumentalist, aromatherapist
- Instruments: Viola, clarinet, piano, vocals
- Years active: 1983–present
- Website: marialamburn.com

Maria Lamburn (Madalena, Maria Madalena, Galé Ritonic; Born 26 November 1960) is a British composer and musician whose style uses large scale instrumental scores.

== Education ==
- Royal Academy of Music 1978–80
- Goldsmiths College 1980–83
- Guildhall School of Music and Drama 1983-84

== Career ==
Lamburn's debut album Murmur, funded by the Arts Council of England, was recorded for the jazz label Babel Label in 1999. Her next two albums, Heaven on Earth (2006) and Taith Amser (2006) are of songs; Taith Amser received a Creative Wales award, Arts Council of Wales to tour these albums with imagery by photographic journalist Rhodri Jones.

After graduating from Goldsmiths and Guildhall School of Music and Drama, where her compositional output included scores dealing with experimental graphics, minimalism, sonic collage and visual arts improvisation, Maria won the Cornelius Cardew Prize for Composition, in 1982. Her style includes idiosyncratic in rhythm, line and harmony, and is characterised by an interest in perception which has led her to find potentials for interaction, response, and interpretation – such as field research at the Greenham Common anti-nuclear campaign (1986), setting up a women's radio station and street festival music in Galway with radical playwright Margaretta D'Arcy (1988), music for 'Didn't she do well?' by Valerie Walkerdine, assessing the loss of roots of academic working class women (1990), and 'Home Birth – Your Choice' by Nicky Leap (1991). Commissioning bodies have included contemporary music group, Gemini, Phoenix Arts Centre, BBC Singers, Women in Music. Her music has been played and broadcast worldwide, from BBC Radio 3, St John's, Smith Square, Vortex Jazz Club, Bloomsbury Theatre, London to Radio Canada. In 1993, Maria, her husband Huw Warren and children left London and returned to Wales where they both had family roots. Maria's educational work as a conductor and instrumental tutor (woodwind, strings, piano, guitar) for the local Waldorf school in Tremadog, the Gwynedd music service (Ysgolion Gwasanaeth William Mathias) and her own ventures, Maizeh Music music publishing (1998-) and galeriTONIC Arts-Healing-Education (begun 2009), produced a portfolio of educational compositions and arrangements. Maria's interdisciplinary projects involve written and improvised music and visual art - including fine art, sculpture, blacksmithing, photography, film, scent and bodywork. In 2013 she began to document a new tune every day, which led to her posting a daily publication 'Play On on Instagram (2016-). Lamburn donated to a life drawing group at The Institwt, Caernarfon, she saved it from collapse when Bangor University axed its Fine Art courses in 2017; she had already established the online AGORA Welsh Art Thread (Edau Celf Cymraeg).

== Collaborations ==
Maria's collaborations include: Dragon Tongue Trio (2011) with Fred Thelonious Baker & Zoot Warren; A Hedgerow Song (2009) with Mark Lockheart - medieval tunes with contemporary improvised experimental explorations; Huw Warren's Tails for Wales UK tour/ Brecon Jazz Festival 2015, This is Now (Welsh Tour 2005), 100s of things a boy can make (2003 Babel Label), A Barrel Organ Far From Home (1997) Babel Label, BBC Radio 4 & European festivals); Caroline Kraabel Mass Producers 1998, June Tabor (trio tour with Huw Warren 1988; Always (Topic); Billy Jenkins' VOGC; Hot Club of Hackney Gypsy Orchestra 1991-3; Charles Hayward's Camberwell Now cult experimental rock band, touring Europe (mid 1980s) & recording Greenfingers 1986 (RecRec); Shelleyan Orphan (signed Rough Trade Records); Regular Music systems-rock band (Jeremy Peyton Jones), Regular Music LP (Rough Trade Records 1985); John Cage at 70 in London with the composer – performance of Music Walk filmed by Peter Greenaway (1982).

== Commissions ==
- Taith Amser Arts Council of Wales
- Murmur Arts Council of Wales
- Celebration 1st Celebration of Women in Music and the Arts, National Gallery of Canada (Radio Canada)
- Iduna and the golden apples Snowdonia Steiner School
- Calling Kids and Cooching Gemini – Chard Festival of Women in Music
- As many women as evolve Phoenix Arts Centre
- Chant BBC Singers – St John's Smith Square, London (Radio 3 broadcast)
- Selected Songs 1986-8 from opera material sourced at Greenham Common and Galway, Margaretta D'Arcy
- The Wake Regular Music – Bloomsbury Theatre, London
- Dance piece Royal Academy of Dance

Videos –

- On the other Side 2016 a musical swim across the River Ribble, symbolically reaching to the other side of the water
- Home Birth – Your Choice 1991 Nicky Leap
- Didn't she do well? 1990 Valerie Walkerdine

== Awards ==
- Winner of Cornelius Cardew Prize for Composition 1982
- ACW Creative Wales Award 2005

== Discography ==
- Murmur – Babel – 1999
- Heaven on Earth – Maizeh Music 2006
- Taith Amser – Maizeh Music 2006

== galeriTONIC forum ==
Maria founded the arts-healing-education forum galeriTONIC, in 2009. The forum is a hub for her sonic, visual, and olfactory arts expression using complementary therapy, teaching, modelling, and performance genres. galeriTONIC includes private and public portfolios, books, and journals.

== Maizeh Music ==
Maria Lamburn founded music publishing company Maizeh Music in 1998.
