= Massacre (experimental band) =

American experimental rock band

- L-R: Fred Frith, Charles Hayward, Bill Laswell

Background information
- Origin: New York City, U.S.
- Genres: Avant-rock, experimental, free improvisation, punk jazz
- Years active: 1980–1981; 1998–2008
- Labels: Celluloid, Tzadik
- Past members: Fred Frith; Bill Laswell; Fred Maher; Charles Hayward

Massacre was founded in 1980 in New York City by guitarist Fred Frith, bassist Bill Laswell and drummer Fred Maher as an improvising and experimental rock band. They performed live for just over a year and recorded a studio album, Killing Time (1981). Frith and Laswell reformed Massacre in 1998 with drummer Charles Hayward, and released four more albums, Funny Valentine (1998), Meltdown (2001), Lonely Heart (2007) and Love Me Tender (2013). The last three albums were recorded live, the first in London, and the others at European festivals between 1999 and 2008.

The BBC described Massacre as "an unholy union of The Shadows, Captain Beefheart, Derek Bailey and Funkadelic".

== History ==
Guitarist Fred Frith, who was a co-founder of the English avant-rock group Henry Cow, moved to New York City in 1979 after Henry Cow split up. There he met and began performing with bassist Bill Laswell and drummer Fred Maher, both of the jazz ensemble Material. In 1980, when Peter Blegvad was looking for an opening band for his Valentine's Day concert at Soundscape in New York, Frith volunteered and invited Laswell and Maher to join him as a power trio they called Massacre. The band was well received and soon began performing at venues all over New York City.

Massacre was a high-energy experimental rock band, manipulating rhythm and timbre freely. They intended to recapture the energy of early rock and roll, adding elements of improvisational jazz. Frith told DownBeat magazine in 1982: "[Massacre] was formed to play the kind of loud and energetic racket that you hear in clubs. The group was a direct response to New York. [It was] a very aggressive group, kind of my reaction to the whole New York rock club scene." He added later, "I really fancied the idea of using a very raw rock music form. The whole idea was to strip away everything that wasn’t necessary."

Their live sets consisted of both composed and improvised numbers, often short but always loud. They toured the United States and Europe in 1980 and 1981, and their performances at progressive rock venues in France were well received.

In 1981 Massacre released their only album Killing Time, comprising studio recordings made at Martin Bisi's studio in Brooklyn, New York City, in June 1981, and live recordings from their Paris concerts in April 1981. They also featured on part of Frith's 1981 solo album Speechless. Massacre's farewell performances took place at Manhattan's Inroads performance space over the course of a July 4 weekend in 1981 (July 2–4), after which Maher left and the band split up.

In 1983 what was left of Massacre joined The Golden Palominos, founded by drummer Anton Fier. The closest thing to another Massacre performance came at a concert, Two Against One, in Boston in February 1985, when The Golden Palominos performed with only three members: Frith, Laswell and Fier on drums. They played as if they were Massacre, including a number of pieces from Killing Time in their set. This unit also played in Tokyo around the same time.

Massacre reformed in 1998 when Frith and Laswell asked This Heat's drummer Charles Hayward to join them. The new line-up released Funny Valentine (1998), culled from studio improvisations, and three live albums, Meltdown (2001), a largely unedited concert recorded at Robert Wyatt's 2001 Meltdown Festival in London, Lonely Heart (2007), arranged from live recordings made in 2003 in Paris and Denmark, and Love Me Tender (2013), recorded in 1999 and 2008 in Europe. All four albums were released on John Zorn's Tzadik label.

== Members ==
- Fred Frith – guitar, Casio, radio, voice, World War II pilot's throat microphone
- Bill Laswell – 4 and 6 string bass guitars, pocket trumpet
- Fred Maher (1980–1981) – drums, percussion
- Charles Hayward (1998–2008) – drums, voice, melodica

== Discography ==
- Killing Time (1981, LP, Celluloid Records, France)
- Funny Valentine (1998, CD, Tzadik Records, U.S.)
- Meltdown (2001, CD, Tzadik Records, U.S.)
- Lonely Heart (2007, CD, Tzadik Records, U.S.)
- Love Me Tender (2013, CD, Tzadik Records, U.S.)

In 1993 RecRec Music reissued Killing Time on CD with six extra tracks (one of them coming from Frith's Speechless album).

In 2005 Fred Frith released a remastered version of Killing Time on CD on his own label, Fred Records with the six extra tracks from the RecRec reissue, plus two previously unreleased tracks, "Third Street" and "F.B.I." (live Paris 1981). This edition includes the following note: "In contrast to previous CD and LP versions, the Killing Time LP cuts are heard here as originally intended, at the correct speed and pitch and without added reverb."
