= Guerilla Welfare =

Canadian electronic music duo (1986–1995)

- Origin: Edmonton, Alberta, Canada
- Genre: Electronic
- Years active: 1986–1995
- Label: He-Dead
- Past members: Brian Schultze; Curtis Ruptash

Guerilla Welfare was an independent electronic music duo from Edmonton, Alberta, active from 1986 to 1995. The principal members were Brian Schultze and Curtis Ruptash, both of whom were previously members of the Stony Plain Records recording band Subtle Hints.

The duo produced music from processed acoustic and electric instruments with spoken word and field recordings of acoustic "world" instruments and singing samples. The resulting sound was a pan-ethnic, experimental sound. One critic wrote, "Their pan-global, multi-media palette supported zeitgeist commentary – often, with a healthy dose of gallows humour – on gender, power structures, and sexual and geopolitical tensions. Their DIY bunker studio experimentations align them with genre defying dub-infused outfits like African Head Charge, Dome, Lifetones, Naffi, Woo, Negativland, and The Residents."

The pair released three albums through their own label, He-Dead Records. Two compilation albums were later produced on other labels.

== Guerilla Welfare – 1986 ==
Their first album, Guerilla Welfare, was released in 1986. The budget for the album was $2,700; only 500 copies were printed, and the covers were silk-screened by hand. The tracks "Aggression", "Mistah Bo He Dead" and "Atom Bomb" performed well, particularly on North-American campus radio. "Atom Bomb" was used in an episode of MTV's The Real World. The duo found independent records stores and distributors in Canada, the U.S. and the UK. They had few performances, though did play at the 1986 Edmonton Fringe Festival.

== Rhesus Pieces – 1988 ==
In 1988, the album Rhesus Pieces was released, included three guest vocalists: singers Mandy Cousins and Denise Spitzer and the Edmonton artist Patrick Higgins. The singles "Melting Pot", "Is Everything OK?" and "Mr. Mighty (On the Floor)" did very well on North-American campus radio stations. That year, they contributed the previously-unrecorded song "Growth?" to the compilation Driven Element put together by the Edmonton campus radio station CJSR. They also teamed up with the poet Mary Howes, filmmaker Jane Evans, dancer Debra Shantz, and Mile Zero Dance for a multimedia performance at Calgary's The New Gallery.

== Evidence I Was Here – 1991 ==
In 1990, Mary Howes's book Vanity Shades was released, and Guerilla Welfare supported her at her bookstore readings – she read her poems over their tracks. Her publisher, Red Deer College Press, licensed the recordings and issued them on cassette with the book's first editions. Guerilla Welfare released them on their 1991 album Evidence I Was Here, and the singles "Rock-A-Bye", "Easy Street", "Cobalt" and "Box Factory" became underground hits.

Following the release, Curtis Ruptash moved to Chicago and became a record producer, while Brian Schultze stayed in Edmonton and opened a store, Avenue Guitars.

In 2016, Soundpoint issued the complete Guerilla Welfare catalogue on an album called Eye-Holes Off-Center. In 2019, Musique Plastique released a curated compilation of Guerilla Welfare songs called The Nature of Human Nature.

On June 11, 2021, to celebrate its 30th anniversary, Guerilla Welfare reissued its debut album on all streaming platforms.

== Discography ==
=== Albums ===
- 1986: Guerilla Welfare (He-Dead)
- 1988: Rhesus Pieces (He-Dead)
- 1991: Evidence I Was Here (He-Dead)

=== Compilations ===
- 1988: Driven Element (CJSR Radio) – featured on one track: "Growth?"
- 2016: Eye-Holes Off-Center (Soundpoint)
- 2019: The Nature of Human Nature (Musique Plastique)
