= Fourth Wall (album) =

Studio album by the Flying Lizards
- Released: 1981
- Studios: Berry Street, Pathway, Music Works, Mekon, London
- Label: Virgin
- Producer: David Cunningham

The Flying Lizards chronology
The Flying Lizards (1979)	Fourth Wall (1981)	Top Ten (1984)

Fourth Wall is the second studio album by English rock band the Flying Lizards. It was released in 1981 on Virgin. The album features numerous collaborators, including Robert Fripp.

== Reception ==
Professional ratings
Review scores
Source	Rating
AllMusic	3.5/5 stars
Record Collector	5/5 stars

Trouser Press called it "well-produced and interesting as individual songs, but it fails to jell as an album".

== Track listing ==
All tracks are composed by David Cunningham except where indicated.

Tracks that were originally on side 1 of the LP:

1. "Lovers and Other Strangers" (David Cunningham, Patti Palladin, Steve Beresford)
2. "Glide/Spin" (Cunningham, Palladin)
3. "In My Lifetime"
4. "Cirrus"
5. "A-Train" (Cunningham, Palladin)
6. "New Voice"

Tracks that were originally on side 2 of the LP:

1. "Hands 2 Take" (Nyman, Cunningham, Palladin)
2. "An Age"
3. "Steam Away"
4. "Move On Up" (Curtis Mayfield)
5. "Another Story"
6. "Lost and Found" (Cunningham, Robert Fripp)

== Personnel ==
- Patti Palladin - vocals
- David Cunningham - effects, guitar, harmonica, keyboards, percussion, violin, vocals
- Julian Marshall - keyboards, vocals
- J.J. Johnson - drums

with:

- Robert Fripp - guitar on "Glide/Spin" and "Lost and Found"
- Steve Beresford - bass, guitar, keyboards on "Lovers and Other Strangers"
- Peter Gordon - saxophone on "Glide/Spin"
- Val Haller - bass on "In My Lifetime" and "A-Train"
- Gareth Sager - saxophone on "A-Train"
- Cheryl Lewis - vocals on "New Voice"
- Michael Nyman - piano on "Hands 2 Take"
- Keith Thompson - baritone saxophone on "Hands 2 Take"
- Ben Grove - bass on "Hands 2 Take"
- Steve Saunders - trombone on "Hands 2 Take"
- Anne Barnard - horns on "Hands 2 Take"
- Edward Pillinger, Rory Allam - bass clarinet on "Hands 2 Take"
- Lucie Skeaping, Nick Hayley - rebec on "Hands 2 Take"

Technical

- Al Williams, Dave Hunt, John Strudwick, Rob Doran - engineer
- David Cunningham, Laurie-Rae Chamberlain - artwork
