= Desert Window =

Studio album by Lucy Gooch
- Released: 6 June 2025
- Length: 41:52
- Label: Fire
- Producer: Alistair Lax

Lucy Gooch chronology
Rushing (2020)	Desert Window (2025)

Singles from Desert Window
- 1. "Like Clay" Released: 4 March 2025

Desert Window is the debut studio album by English musician Lucy Gooch. It was released on 6 June 2025 by Fire Records in vinyl and digital formats.

The album consists of eight tracks with a total runtime of approximately forty-two minutes, each song ranging between three and six minutes. It incorporates elements of folk and ambient music. Released five years after Gooch's 2020 debut EP, Rushing, the album features the lead single, "Like Clay", which was released on 4 March 2025.

== Reception ==
Professional ratings
Review scores
Source	Rating
AllMusic	3.5/5 stars
The Line of Best Fit	7/10 stars
Uncut	8/10 stars

AllMusic's Paul Simpson described the album as "a more fleshed-out expansion of her sound, incorporating more acoustic instrumentation as well as more complex choral harmonies."

Rob Hughes of Uncut rated the album eight out of ten and stated, "Lucy Gooch's early life as a chorister feeds into Desert Window's beauteous soundscapes, looping her gentle soprano voice over gauzy layers of synths in a seamless shift of classical, ambient, jazz and dream-folk textures."

The Line of Best Fit assigned a rating of seven out of ten to the album and described it as "a masterclass in atmospheric tension and release, a record that feels both ancient and contemporary, grounded and otherworldly."

== Track listing ==
All tracks are written by Lucy Gooch.

Desert Window track listing
No.	Title	Length
1.	"Like Clay"	3:01
2.	"Night Window – Part One"	4:44
3.	"Night Window – Part Two"	5:34
4.	"Keep Pulling Me In"	6:12
5.	"Jack Hare"	6:20
6.	"Clouds"	5:35
7.	"Our Relativity"	5:27
8.	"Desert Window"	4:59
Total length:		41:52

== Personnel ==
Credits adapted from Tidal.

- Lucy Gooch – lead vocals, guitar, keyboards, synthesizer
- Alistair Lax – production, arrangement, bass guitar, guitar, piano, strings, synthesizer
- Oliver Andrews – guitar, percussion, piano, synthesizer
- Laura Cannell – alto recorder, violin
- Rupert Clervaux – mastering
- Harry Furniss – cornet
- Jonny Hooker – mastering
- Simon McCorry – cello
- Jack Wyllie – saxophone
