= Camberwell Now =

English avant-prog band (1982–1987)

- Clockwise, upper left: Rickard, Goronwy, Hayward.

Background information
- Origin: London, England
- Genres: Avant-prog
- Years active: 1982–1987
- Label: Recommended
- Spinoff of: This Heat
- Past members: Charles Hayward; Trefor Goronwy; Stephen Rickard

Camberwell Now were an English avant-prog band from London, formed in 1982 after the demise of This Heat.

== Background ==
Camberwell Now were formed out of the remnants of This Heat by drummer and vocalist Charles Hayward, bassist and vocalist Trefor Goronwy, who had joined This Heat to replace Gareth Williams after the latter had quit the band, and This Heat's former sound technician Stephen Rickard, who employed field recordings and tape effects. Saxophonist Maria Lamburn joined the group in 1985.

Their debut release was the Meridian EP, released in 1983 through Duplicate Records. This was followed by the studio album The Ghost Trade, released in 1986 through Recommended Records. In reviewing the album, AllMusic called the group "as challenging, experimental and brilliantly realised" as This Heat, and that the album features "some of Charles Hayward's more profound lyrical work." Another EP, Greenfingers, was released in 1987. Camberwell Now also contributed two tracks for the Sub Rosa Records Myths/Instructions album and a track for the Touch audio cassette/magazine. Most of this material was later reissued in CD form as All's Well by RecRec Music in 1992, and this compilation was remastered and reissued in November 2006 by ReR Megacorp.

== Discography ==
Studio albums

- The Ghost Trade (1986)

EPs

- Meridian (1983)
- Greenfingers (1987)

Compilation albums

- All's Well (1992)
