= Quercus (album) =

Studio album by June Tabor, Huw Warren & Iain Ballamy
- Released: March 22, 2013
- Recorded: March 2006
- Genre: Folk, Jazz, Folk jazz
- Length: 59:25 min.
- Label: ECM Records
- Producer: Manfred Eicher

Quercus is a 2013 live album by English folksinger June Tabor, Welsh jazz pianist Huw Warren & English saxophonist Iain Ballamy. It is also the name of the trio project which derived from an earlier collaboration on Tabor's At the Wood's Heart from 2005. Though, Warren has been a pianist and musical director for Tabor since 1988. The recording took place at The Anvil in Basingstoke at the end of a tour in March 2006. Ballamy, who has previously recorded for ECM Records with his experimental jazz duo Food, recalled “the piano was excellent, the acoustics in the hall were good, and nobody coughed.”

== Material ==
Many of the pieces dig deep into the British folk music and are well known traditionals. Furthermore, they fall back to works of William Shakespeare or Robert Burns and George Butterworth and set them into new arrangements for this trio. "This Is Always" by Mack Gordon and Harry Warren remains the only jazz standard while one contemporary song by film composer David Ballantine entered the track list. Additionally the pop songs "Who Wants the Evening Rose" by Les Barker/Yosef Hadar and "All I Ask of You" by American monk Gregory Norbet (an adaption Ballamy previously created with colleague Django Bates for their Loose Tubes) were queued. The timeline concludes with a solo composition by Warren which is inspired by Renaissance composer John Dowland.

== Track listing ==
No.	Title	Lyrics	Music	Length
1.	"Lassie Lie Near Me"	Robert Burns	traditional	5:09
2.	"Come Away Death"	William Shakespeare	traditional, arr. by Ballamy	6:31
3.	"As I Roved Out"	traditional	traditional	5:56
4.	"The Lads In Their Hundreds"	A. E. Housman, arr. by Ballamy	George Butterworth	5:35
5.	"Teares"	(piano solo)	Huw Warren	3:54
6.	"Near But Far Away"	traditional	traditional, arr. by Ballamy	7:27
7.	"Brigg Fair"	traditional	traditional, solo arr. by Tabor	2:25
8.	"Who Wants The Evening Rose"	Les Barker	Yosef Hadar	4:41
9.	"This Is Always"	Mack Gordon	Harry Warren	4:35
10.	"A Tale From History (The Shooting)"	Dave Ballantine	Dave Ballantine	4:31
11.	"All I Ask Of You"	Gregory Norbet	Gregory Norbet	8:03

== Personnel ==
=== Music ===
- June Tabor - vocals
- Huw Warren - piano
- Iain Ballamy - soprano & tenor saxophone

=== Production ===
- Manfred Eicher - producing, mixing
- Jan Erik Kongshaug - mixing
- Paul Sparrow - engineering
- Mike Mower - editing
- Jan Kricke - photography
- Sascha Kleis - design

== Reception ==
Professional ratings
Review scores
Source	Rating
Allmusic	4.5/5 stars
The Guardian	4/5 stars
AllAboutJazz	5/5 stars
Irish Times	5/5 stars
Jazz Journal	5/5 stars

The album has been widely praised by international media while especially Tabor's participation and their interplay gathered profound recognition. The Times has prescinded that "the fusion is magical here as the pair’s subtle embellishments accentuate the force of Tabor’s austere yet soulful delivery on tunes that range from ancient folk to their own." John Kelman at AllAboutJazz points out the interaction saying that "Tabor [is] acting as the focal point around which her partners' improvisational forays ultimately rally". The Observer critic Dave Gelly admitted that "this is one of the most surprising and beautiful pieces of work I have heard in a long time." While John Fordham wrote in The Guardian that "Nobody plays a note too many or expresses a false emotion. It's a unique tribute to the power of song." It peaked the Billboard Jazz Album charts at #34 in 2013. Even the Rolling Stone has called it "One of the year’s very best." Furthermore, it was "Album of the Week" in JazzWeekly and German newspaper Frankfurter Allgemeine Zeitung.
