= For a Reason =

Studio album by Lifetones
- Released: December 1983
- Studios: Cold Storage, Brixton, London, UK
- Genres: Dub; post-punk; world music
- Length: 33:02
- Label: Tone of Life
- Producer: Charles Bullen

For a Reason is the sole studio album by English duo Lifetones, consisting of This Heat's Charles Bullen and his then-neighbour Julius Cornelius Samuel. It was released in 1983 under the Tone of Life imprint, and was later reissued in 2016 by Light in the Attic Records. The album – recorded in Cold Storage Studios – combines post-punk and dub with a range of different stylistic influences from world music. Intended as a reaction against "the culture of death that was around" at the time, the album is also far more positive in comparison to Bullen's work with This Heat; its "koanic" and "ephemeral" lyrics subverting common linguistic cliches and tropes through repetition.

Mostly ignored in 1983, the album would go on to become an expensive & "sought-after" collector's item in the decades following its release. It received far more attention upon being reissued, with most of it being very positive in nature. The album has additionally garnered praised from musicians such as David Grubbs and Daniel O'Sullivan.

== Background ==
After This Heat disbanded in 1982, Bullen recruited Samuel (whom he'd met whilst buying a clarinet in a junk shop) from his own neighbourhood to record the 6 songs that would appear on the album at Cold Storage (the studio where his former band This Heat had recorded most of their material). The album was heavily influenced by the reggae and world music that was locally popular in Brixton at the time.

Many listeners would later speculate that Bullen and Samuel were the same person, an idea that was refuted in the liner notes to the album's 2016 reissue. In fact, Samuel would later go on to record and release music of his own under the moniker "Dub Judah".

== Content ==
Pitchfork described the album as "a strange amalgam of post-punk's desolation set to dub reggae's sunny lilt". The album also features influences from what would go on to be called "world music", like the track "Traveling" which "places a wild, Middle Eastern-tinged clarinet over a Greek bouzouki strummed with raga-like intensity, laying the path for globetrotting psychedelic punks like Sun City Girls." A Popmatters review similarly noted that the track "Decide" "carries a distinctly Jamaican aroma but there’s as much Bali and Krautrock on the rest of the record as there is Rasta rock." The closing track "Patience" earned comparisons to "Open Up The Gate" by The Congos for its "warm, melodic" intro "section that's dropped quickly." The track "Good Side" has been described as being more rock-influenced, whilst reggae influences are more prominent on the title track.

With Thatcherite politics and Reaganomics gaining momentum, the album - according to its liner notes - was intended as a reaction against “the culture of death that was around” at the time. As a result - in contrast to Bullen's darker and more paranoid work with This Heat - For a Reason has been described as being more "blissed-out", escapist, and "ephemeral"; its "koanic" lyrics "mainly consisting of "do unto others"-type fare." Similar to This Heat's "Cenotaph" (off of their final album), the lyrics also consist of "[s]elf-help altruisms, textbook histories, [and] familiar parlance, repeated ad infinitum until the very fibre of each cliche becomes porous and their meanings subverted."

== Reception ==
=== Initial ===
Released with little promotion from Bullen in 1983, For a Reason "sank without a trace." Bullen would subsequently disband Lifetones owing to a "complete lack of [public] interest." It would, however, go on to become a "sought-after collector’s item that change[d] hands for hundreds of dollars a time" and "a holy grail for fans of weird, inventive and life-affirming music, a remarkable feat for an obscure one-off project."

=== Retrospective ===
Professional ratings
Review scores
| Source | Rating |
|---|---|
| AllMusic | 4/5 stars |
| Pitchfork | 7.4/10 |
| PopMatters | 6/10 stars |
| Record Collector | 4/5 stars |
| Resident Advisor | 4.3/5 |
| Spectrum Culture | 3/5 stars |

The album has received far more attention upon being reissued by Light in the Attic Records in 2016, most of which has been positive. Pitchfork wrote: "while it's not nearly as vital or serrated as This Heat's output, there's something enchanting about For a Reason." AllMusic wrote that it "remains a unique, thrilling album". McDermott similarly wrote that even after 3 decades, "For A Reason retains its transportive [sic] magic." Dusted wrote that the album "feels modest and yet complete in its representation of one man’s idiosyncratic embrace of the world he’d been given to live in."

Conversely, a mixed review came from Jedd Beaudoin of Spectrum Culture who found the album to be inconsistent, citing the tracks "Distance No Object" and "Patience" as being dated and monotonous respectively. However, he ends by conceding that the album "might [offer] a surprise or two for This Heat fans who thought they knew the whole story."

=== Legacy ===
David Grubbs praised the title track as being "an earworm par excellence", and "thank"ed Bullen for it in an interview. Daniel O'Sullivan picked the album for Fact Magazine's "Forgotten Classics" series.

== Track listing ==
All tracks composed by Charles Bullen, except tracks 4–6 co-written with Julius Cornelius Samuel

1. "For a Reason" - 6:37
2. "Good Side" - 3:55
3. "Decide" - 5:24
4. "Travelling" - 5:08
5. "Distance No Object" - 6:39
6. "Patience" - 5:19

== Personnel ==
Adapted from Allmusic:

- Charles Bullen - vocals, guitar, bass, keyboards, percussion, clarinet, recording engineer
- Julius Cornelius Samuel - drums, percussion, keyboards

=== Additional credits ===
- Islaine Jamois - recording engineer
- Tony Cousins - editing
- Martyn Lambert - artwork
- Vaughan Fleming - photography

=== 2016 reissue credits ===
- Lydia Hyslop - project assistant, proof-reading
- Patrick McCarthy - project manager, producer
- No Sleep Nigel - remastering
- Daniel O'Sullivan - liner notes
- Henry H. Owings - design
- Matt Sullivan - executive producer, producer
- Josh Wright - executive producer
