= Speechless (Fred Frith album) =

Studio album by Fred Frith
- Released: 1981
- Recorded: April 1980, United States; July–August 1980, France and Switzerland
- Genre: Avant-rock, experimental
- Length: 43:47
- Label: Ralph
- Producer: Fred Frith, Tina Curran, Etienne Conod, Robert Vogel and Francois Riether

Fred Frith chronology
Gravity (1980)	Speechless (1981)	Live in Japan (1982)

Speechless is a 1981 solo album by English guitarist, composer and improviser Fred Frith of the group Henry Cow. It was Frith's third solo album, and was originally released in the United States on LP record on the Residents' Ralph record label. It was the second of three solo albums Frith made for the label.

Speechless was recorded in France, Switzerland and the United States, and featured Frith with French Rock in Opposition group Etron Fou Leloublan on the first side of the LP, and Frith's New York City band Massacre on the second. It is mostly a studio album with extracts from a Massacre concert mixed into four of the tracks on side two of the LP.

Speechless has been described as a mixture of folk music, free improvisation, avant-rock and noise. AllMusic said that it is often regarded as one of Frith's best solo albums.

== Background and recording ==
Speechless was the second of a series of three solo albums Frith made for the Residents's record label Ralph Records, the first being Gravity (1980), an avant-garde "dance" record that drew on rhythm and dance from folk music across the world, and the third being Cheap at Half the Price (1983). He had recorded with the Residents in the late 1970s and early 1980s, and appeared on several of their albums. Gravity was well received by music critics.

Just as he had worked with two backing bands on Gravity (Swedish Rock in Opposition group Samla Mammas Manna and United States progressive rock group the Muffins), on Speechless Frith used French Rock in Opposition group Etron Fou Leloublan and his own New York City band Massacre. Side one of the LP record was recorded with Etron Fou Leloublan at Studio Freeson in Pujaut, France and at Sunrise Studios, Kirchberg, Switzerland in July and August 1980. Side two of the LP consists of four tracks built around extracts from a Massacre concert at CBGB in New York City in April 1980: "A Spit in the Ocean", "Navajo" and "Saving Grace" were later altered and added to by Frith at Sunrise Studios in July and August 1980, while "Conversations with White Arc" is an unaltered improvised piece. The remaining four tracks of side two were recorded by Frith at Sunrise during the same period.

On Speechless, Frith continued his exploration of world folk and dance music that he had begun on Gravity, but unlike Gravity, Speechless included extensive use of found sounds and field recordings. Frith said that many of the tapes were made while walking the streets of New York City, and include street fairs and demonstrations. Recordings were also made while visiting friends: the title song's rhythm track is provided by a malfunctioning water pipe in Tim Hodgkinson's kitchen.

At the time Frith had a passion for tape manipulation and "sound malfunctions". In a 1982 interview with DownBeat magazine Frith said that so much more can be done with tape: "I'm interested in using the studio for things that you couldn't possibly do in a performance, to use the medium of tape in a way that is intrinsic to it." He added that hardware malfunctions often result in more interesting sounds than was originally intended: "[A] lot of the sounds that I get in the studio have been specifically the result of overloading or causing to malfunction various pieces of technology, like harmonizers or digital delays."

Frith described the theme of Speechless as revolving around "questions of power and language, of striving to find a voice but remaining always on the edge being understood." This notion came to him when he once tried to listen to a recording of an interview he had done, and the cassette machine played back both sides of the tape at the same time, one of them backwards, rendering the words unintelligible. Andrew Jones wrote in Plunderphonics, 'pataphysics & pop mechanics that Speechless is "ultimately about being unable to articulate the words that once flowed freely." Frith explained in an interview with Nicole V. Gagné that the music on the album "has to do with being unable to say what you want to say ... in quite a grim way, for me". Gagné opined that in contrast to "Gravity's light-hearted spirit ... Speechless is in a sense Gravity's shadow", and much of it "is as grim as its cover photo."

== Music ==
Speechless is an instrumental album that includes elements of folk music, free improvisation, avant-rock and noise, plus field recordings and tape manipulation. Featured are also many "happy accidents" that resulted from "sound malfunctions" in the studio. The tracks on the album vary from folk and melodic pieces (including the waltz ballad "Domaine de Planousset"), to noisy avant-rock ("A Spit in the Ocean"), to layered sound collages ("Speechless"). Glenn Astarita at Jazz Review said that the listener can expect "the unexpected, amid pounding backbeats, variable rhythmic flows, and multihued soundscapes." Peter Marsh at BBC Music described the music as being an "unholy alliance" between Captain Beefheart's Magic Band and King Crimson.

"Esperanza" has "all sorts of intense, allusive material", including violins, saxophones, and a recording Frith made of Roger Kent Parsons playing bagpipes in Washington Square Park. Gagné called the bagpipes on the track "somehow absolutely appropriate", and a passing siren "also ... absolutely appropriate". The title track, "Speechless" features extracts from the malfunctioning tape recording of the interview Frith gave, (Note: See Background and recording section) plus "a dissonant keyboard" tracking his voice, and a guitar and bass out of step with each other and the interview. Gagné stated that in contrast, on "Conversations with White Arc", "a genuine dialogue" takes place between Frith's guitar and Laswell's bass. A similar dialogue is created between Frith's acoustic guitar and Tina Curran's bass on "Domaine de Planousset", a track that includes a "shimmering" electric guitar tremolo soundscape, which Gagné called "one of the most beautiful things [Frith has] ever done – a simple, transparent serenity worthy of Erik Satie".

== Reception and influence ==
Professional ratings
Review scores
Source	Rating
AllMusic	4/5 stars

Rock critic Peter Marsh, in a BBC Music review, described Speechless as "beautifully progressive musicmaking that doesn't take itself too seriously." Glenn Astarita at Jazz Review said the album was "highly recommended", adding that "Frith’s off-kilter methodologies translate into a fun-filled production, awash with a cartoon-like rationale." Tom Schulte at AllMusic wrote that Speechless is often regarded as one of Frith's best solo albums, and that its "inspired manipulations hold up under repeated scrutiny."

Nicole V. Gagné wrote in her 1990 book, Sonic Transports: New Frontiers in Our Music that when Speechless was released in 1981, "it seemed to me the most original, finely crafted, and just plain beautiful record [Frith had] ever made – and certainly the most disturbing. Today it sounds even better."

The waltz ballad "Domaine de Planousset" was performed live by Frith several times, including at the 4th Festival International de Musique Actuelle de Victoriaville in Victoriaville in Quebec, Canada with René Lussier in October 1986, and at the Bahnhof Langendreer in Bochum, Germany with Frith's band, Keep the Dog in mid-1991. The performance with Lussier was released as "Domaine Revisited" on Nous Autres in 1987, and the performance with Keep the Dog was released as "Domaine de Langendreer" on That House We Lived In in 2003. "Conversations with White Arc" was revisited on Massacre's 1998 album, Funny Valentine as "Further Conversations with White Arc". In an interview with Popular 1 Magazine, guitarist Kavus Torabi of Cardiacs named Speechless as one of his favourite albums, saying of Frith: "he's like my Elvis".

== Track listing ==
All tracks composed by Fred Frith except where noted.

=== Original 1981 release ===
Side one
No.	Title	Length
1.	"Kick the Can (part 1)"	2:19
2.	"Carnival on Wall Street"	2:51
3.	"Ahead in the Sand"	3:16
4.	"Laughing Matter" / "Esperanza"	7:47
5.	"Women Speak to Men; Men Speak to Women" (Frith, Tina Curran)	5:39

Side two
No.	Title	Length
6.	"A Spit in the Ocean"	2:17
7.	"Navajo"	3:05
8.	"Balance"	5:04
9.	"Saving Grace"	1:57
10.	"Speechless"	3:05
11.	"Conversations with White Arc" (Frith, Laswell)	1:14
12.	"Domaine de Planousset"	2:59
13.	"Kick the Can (part 2)"	2:14

=== 1991 CD re-issue bonus tracks ===
No.	Title	Length
14.	"The Entire Works of Henry Cow"	1:00
15.	"So Schnell Ich" (Frith, Laswell, Maher)	3:25
16.	"I'm Still Here and I Know What Time It Is" (Frith, Curran)	1:06
17.	"No More War" (Frith, Steve Gore)	4:46
18.	"Typical American Family"	1:01
19.	"Dig"	3:07

== Personnel ==
=== Side One ===
- Fred Frith – guitar, violin, mellotron, organ and bass guitar (track 1), voice (track 3)
- Etron Fou Leloublan:
  - Guigou Chenevier – drums, tenor saxophone and voice (track 3)
  - Bernard Mathieu (Note: Credited as Margot Mathieu in the LP liner notes.) – soprano and tenor saxophones, voice (track 3)
  - Ferdinand Richard – bass, guimbarde, voice
  - Jo Thirion – organ, harmonium

Guests

- Tina Curran – recorders, unusual edits
- Roger Kent Parsons – bagpipes (track 4)
- Bob Ostertag – field tape recordings

Production

Recorded at Studio Freeson, Pujaut, France and at Sunrise Studios, Kirchberg, Switzerland in July and August 1980.

- Francois Riether – engineer (France)
- Etienne Conod – engineer (Switzerland)
- Robert Vogel – engineer (Switzerland)

=== Side Two ===
- Fred Frith – guitar, violin, keyboards, bass guitar (tracks 8,10,13), drums (tracks 7,8), voice
- Massacre:
  - Bill Laswell – bass guitar
  - Fred Maher – drums

Guests

- Steve Buchanan – snake saxophone (track 7)
- George Cartwright – alto saxophone (tracks 6,7,9)
- Mars Williams – baritone saxophone (tracks 6,7,9)
- Tina Curran – recorders, bass guitar (tracks 7,12)

Production

Recorded at Sunrise Studios, Kirchberg, Switzerland in July and August 1980. Tracks 1, 4 and the end of track 2 were recorded live at a Massacre concert at CBGB in New York City, April 1980, and were later altered and added to in Switzerland; track 6 is an unaltered improvised piece from the same concert.

- Charlie Martin – engineer (USA)
- Etienne Conod – engineer (Switzerland)
- Robert Vogel – engineer (Switzerland)

=== Bonus tracks on 1991 CD re-issue ===
- Fred Frith – guitar, bass guitar, keyboards, tapes (tracks 14,17), drums (track 16), noise (track 16), voice (track 17,18), homemades (track 18), effects (track 19)
- Bill Laswell – bass guitar (track 15)
- Fred Maher – drums (track 15)
- Tina Curran – voice (track 16)
- Steve Kretzmer – drums (track 17)
- Tetsuto Koyama – bass guitar (track 19)
- Miyamoto – drums (track 19)
- Masami Shinoda – alto saxophone (track 19)
- Chie Mukai – kokyu (track 19)
- Kenichi Takeda – taisho koto (track 19)
- Keiji Haino – voice (track 19)
- Tenko Ueno – voice (track 19)

Recording

- Track 14 is a tape collage of Henry Cow's entire discography prepared by Frith for Morgan Fisher's 1980 Miniatures compilation album; it contains a portion of every track recorded by the band and was assembled by Frith in New York City and KUNM, Albuquerque, New Mexico in 1980 according to a strict mathematical system.
- Track 15 was recorded with Massacre live at Rue Dunois, Paris in 1981 and at home in New York City.
- Track 16 is from Elliott Sharp's State of the Union compilation, recorded at home in New York City, 1982.
- Track 17 is an excerpt from the song 'RIO', taken from the 1984 Rascal Reporters LP Ridin' on a Bummer, recorded at home, 1983.
- Track 18 is from the Japanese compilation Sound Cosmodel, recorded at home, 1982.
- Track 19 is from the Japanese compilation Welcome to Dreamland, collated from the other songs on that record at Studio Dig, Tokyo, February 1985.

=== Artwork ===
- Tina Curran – album cover artwork on the original LP record (Note: Tina Curran was Frith's wife at the time, and the LP cover features a photograph she took of her crying young daughter.)

== CD reissues ==
In 1991 East Side Digital Records and RecRec Music re-issued Speechless on CD with six additional tracks. In 2003 Fred Records issued a remastered version of the original Speechless LP on CD with no extra tracks.

== Works cited ==
- Gagné, Nicole V. (1990). Sonic Transports: New Frontiers in Our Music. De Falco Books. ISBN 978-0-9625145-0-0.
- Jones, Andrew (1995). "Fred Frith". In Jones, Andrew (ed.). Plunderphonics, 'pataphysics & pop mechanics: an introduction to musique actuelle. SAF Publishing Ltd. pp. 28–40. ISBN 0-946719-15-2.
- Milkowski, Bill (1983). "The Frith Factor: Exploration in Sound". DownBeat. 50 (1). Maher Publications: 22–25, 61.
