= Rascal Reporters =

American avant-rock group

- Steve Gore (left) and Steve Kretzmer (right) on the back cover of the 1984 'Ridin On A Bummer' LP

Background information
- Origin: Oak Park, Michigan, United States
- Genres: Avant-prog, Experimental rock, progressive rock, Canterbury scene, Rock in Opposition
- Years active: 1974–2009, 2017-present
- Labels: Hebbardesque, Cuneiform Records, Wafer Face, ZNR, Pleasant Green, Eurock
- Members: Steve Kretzmer; James Strain
- Past members: Steve Gore; Rick Barenholtz
- Website: Rascal Reporters homepage

Rascal Reporters is an American avant-garde progressive rock band founded in 1974 by multi-instrumentalists Steve Kretzmer and Steve Gore. Based in Oak Park, Michigan, the band consisted of the duo of Steve Gore and Steve Kretzmer from its founding until Gore's death in 2009. They released seven studio albums between 1980 and 2008, and in 2017 were reformed by Steve Kretzmer with new member James Strain.

== History ==
=== Pigling Bland (1974-76) ===
The group was initially formed in high school in 1974 as a 4-piece called Rebskasos, featuring Steve Gore, Steve Kretzmer, Rick Barenholtz and Joel Hirsch. Hirsch left the following year, and the remaining members rebranded as Pigling Bland, named for a Soft Machine song of the same title. During 1975 and 1976, the group performed at several school events and made demo recordings in the basement of Gore's family home. As both Steve Gore and Steve Kretzmer were multi-instrumentalists, they often alternated between the roles of keyboards or drums depending on the composition. Rick Barenholtz played the bass guitar. A recording of one of the live performances was later released in 2013 under the name "Elegant Decay".

During this same time period, Steve Gore and Steve Kretzmer wrote and recorded new music daily onto reel-to-reel tape, beginning a career-spanning archive of material that the band would refer to as the "RRkives".

=== Early Reporters (1977-80) ===
A few months after their final school performances, Pigling Bland disbanded upon completion of high school and went their separate ways for college. During their time in college, Steve Gore and Steve Kretzmer continued working together, bonding over shared interests and proficiencies, and developing their process.

The first Rascal Reporters recordings were created during this time period. They were recorded to tapes by Gore at Central Michigan University and by Kretzmer when on break from Grand Valley State University (several of these recordings appear on the 2015 rarities compilation, "Nice Not To Be Here"). The duo developed a way of working which featured throughout their career, whereby the member that composed a particular piece of music would generally perform all the parts of the song themselves. This essentially meant that much of the band's output was seen as the combination of two one-man bands under one band name.

The duo eventually made their public debut with a cassette release titled "Freaks Obscure" in 1980 on California-based record label Eurock. This was immediately followed-up with "We’re God", also a Eurock cassette release, and also issued in 1980. These two releases established a small cult following for the band.

=== LP releases (1980s) ===
The group continued writing and recording, and issued a limited-run 45rpm single in 1981, "Guns For Jerry’s Kids / Beatrice", and spent the next few years preparing their subsequent 1984 album, "Ridin’ On A Bummer" which was released independently as a vinyl LP under the bands own imprint Hebbardesque Records. This album included guest appearances from renowned names of the Rock in Opposition scene which the band were fans of: Fred Frith and Tim Hodgkinson of the group Henry Cow, along with Dave Newhouse of the Muffins. These guest appearances were recorded via mail, with Steve Gore sending a reel of tape to the guest, who would then record onto it and mail it back. This album received distribution from Recommended Records, which helped expose the group to more listeners of avant-prog and Rock in Opposition music. An excerpt of the song "RIO" featuring Fred Frith's guest performance was later included on the 1991 re-issue of Frith's solo album, Speechless, under the name "No More War".

In 1988, they released their follow-up LP "Happy Accidents", again through their own imprint Hebbardesque Records. This release featured further guest appearances from musicians associated with Rock in Opposition and avant-prog, such as Guy Segers of Belgium’s Univers Zero, Nick Didkovsky of New York’s Doctor Nerve, Dave Newhouse of the Muffins, Steven Feigenbaum of Cuneiform Records, Dave Kerman of 5uu's, James Grigsby of Motor Totemist Guild, as well as Steve Kretzmer’s older brother, Paul Kretzmer.

=== CD releases (1990s) ===
During the 90s, the group released one official studio album titled "Purple Entrapment" (1995), which was released on CD via Wafer Face. This release saw the group's sound turn to more digital and electronic textures, with sounds reminiscent of muzak and the beginning of Steve Gore's use of the Roland Sound Canvas for music production which he would continue to use on subsequent releases. The album was initially conceived as a batch of songs by Steven Kretzmer for a solo release, which were then supplemented with new songs by Steve Gore to make up a full album. The compositions on this album featured vocals more prominently than previous Reporters albums and with slightly more 'song-like' structures as opposed to their usual through-composed approach.

During the 90s, the group also re-issued some of their earlier releases on CD, such as "Happy Accidents" and "We're God", both of which received new mixes by Steve Gore. The "Happy Accidents" CD re-issue, which was released in 1996 on ZNR Records (US) and Heresie (Japan), also featured a new 25-minute composition from Steve Gore titled "Stabbing At Air".

=== Final Steve Gore releases (2000s) ===
In 2001, "The Foul-Tempered Clavier" was released on CD by Pleasant Green Records. This release saw the band mostly eschew vocal material and return to more complex instrumental through-composed music. The group were inspired by a shared-favourite artist of theirs – Frank Zappa, particularly the Uncle Meat album along with music from his later Synclavier years. It once again featured contributions from Dave Newhouse on horns.

The final Rascal Reporters full-length album to feature the original line-up was released online as a digital download in 2008, titled "The Mind Boggles". It was written and recorded primarily by Steve Gore during a time where Steve Kretzmer was taking a break from music, though Kretzmer writes and performs on 3 tracks from the album. The album also features guests Mark Harris of Thinking Plague on saxophone and keyboardist Michael Sahl (collaborator of Judy Collins & Van Dyke Parks).

=== Gore's death and archival releases (2009-2017) ===
On March 14, 2009, news came that Steve Gore had died suddenly at his home near Detroit.

During the first half of the 2010s, a project was undertaken by then-manager of the band Brian Donohoe to digitise the collection of Rascal Reporters archived reel-to-reel tapes, DATs and cassettes. Much music was remixed and remastered by Donohoe for compilation releases and single / EP releases digitally on Bandcamp, including early Pigling Bland live performances, a large number of never-before-released Rascal Reporters songs, and solo releases completed by both members of the group in the late 80s.

=== Reformation (2018-present) ===
In late 2018, Steve Kretzmer released a new digital single under the Rascal Reporters name, "Unknowable / I Cries Crimes", featuring guests Guy Segers of Univers Zero, Kimara Sajn of Polyethylene Pet & Thinking Plague, and Dario D’Alessandro of Homunculus Res.

In early 2019, it was announced that Steve Kretzmer would be joined in the latest iteration of the group by Irish producer and multi-instrumentalist James Strain. In the same year, the group released "Redux, Vol. 1" which featured unfinished archival recordings from the 70s & 80s reworked by Strain with additional instrumentation and overdubs. This was followed up by another volume, "Redux, Vol. 2: Rascals Revenge & The Great Reset", in 2021.

The group issued an album of new studio material titled "The Strainge Case of Steve" via Cuneiform Records on July 28, 2023. This is the group's first album consisting of new compositions since 2008's "The Mind Boggles", and their first to feature compositions from Strain.

A re-mixed and re-mastered compilation of the two "Redux" volumes was released digitally as "Dux In A Row" by áMARXE Records on November 3 of the same year, along with a double-CD release featuring both "Dux In A Row" and "The Strainge Case of Steve".

== Discography ==
=== Studio albums ===
- Freaks Obscure (1980, cassette)
- We're God (1980, cassette)
- Ridin' on a Bummer (1984, LP)
- Happy Accidents (1988, LP)
- Purple Entrapment (1995, CD)
- The Foul-Tempered Clavier (2001, CD)
- The Mind Boggles (2008, digital)
- The Strainge Case of Steve (2023, digital & CD)
- Dux In A Row (2023, digital & CD)
