= Michael Upton =

British artist

Michael Upton (1938–2002) was a British artist notable as a painter, performance artist and teacher.

== Biography ==
Upton was born in Birmingham. After studying at the Birmingham College of Art from 1954 to 1958, he went on to study at the Royal Academy Schools in London until 1962, where his friends included David Hockney. While he was still a student Upton was awarded a Leverhulme Scholarship and an Abbey Scholarship in 1962, which allowed him to study in Rome. He was also the winner of the 1971 Cassandra Foundation Award (William Copley), New York, and a major South West Arts award in 1981. Upton took a teaching post at the Royal Academy Schools and also served as an external assessor and visiting tutor at other art schools. He exhibited widely, having several solo shows in London, mainly at the Anne Berthoud Gallery, as well as in New York in 1987 at the Yale Centre for British Art and the Anthony Ralph Gallery in New York. From 1989 to 1972 he was a visiting Lecturer at Nova Scotia College of Art & Design (NSCAD). Returning to the UK, he became a Senior Lecturer at Maidstone College of Art, where he was tutor to, among others, Stephen Partridge and David Cunningham. He also took part in numerous group shows, from the First Day Covers exhibition in 1980 in what was then the Newlyn Orion Gallery, to Artists Against Apartheid at the Royal Festival Hall in 1985.

With his close friend, the painter Peter Lloyd Jones, Upton founded the performance art group London Calling, based at the Institute of Contemporary Arts in London. He lived for many years in Mousehole, Cornwall, and died in Truro on 20 September 2002, aged 64.

Examples of his work are in the Arts Council Collection at the Southbank Centre in London, in the Government Art Collection, and in the British Council collection. His artistic estate is represented by Messum's of London.
