= Lonely Heart (album) =

Live album by Massacre
- Released: May 2007
- Recorded: January 25, 2003 - France; June 26, 2003 - Denmark
- Venue: Festival Sons d'Hiver, Paris; Roskilde Festival, Denmark
- Genre: Avant-rock, free improvisation
- Length: 58:04
- Label: Tzadik (United States)
- Producer: Fred Frith

Massacre chronology
Meltdown (2001)	Lonely Heart (2007)	Love Me Tender (2013)

Professional ratings
Review scores
Source	Rating
AllMusic	4/5 stars
Dusted Reviews	Mixed

Lonely Heart is a live album by avant-rock, experimental power trio Massacre, featuring guitarist Fred Frith, bassist Bill Laswell and drummer Charles Hayward. It was recorded at the Festival Sons d'Hiver in Paris, France on January 25, 2003, and at the Roskilde Festival in Denmark on June 26, 2003.

== Track listing ==
All tracks composed by Massacre.

1. "Send" – 19:49
2. "Step" – 5:11
3. "In" – 7:40
4. "Gracias a la Vida" – 18:31
5. "Return" – 6:53

Source: AllMusic, Discogs.

== Personnel ==
Massacre

- Fred Frith – guitar
- Bill Laswell – bass guitars
- Charles Hayward – drums, voice, melodica

=== Sound and artwork ===
- Oz Fritz – engineer, live mixing
- Peter Hardt – mixing
- Myles Boisen – pre-mastering
- Scott Hull – mastering
- Fred Frith – producer
- Kazunori Sugiyama – associate executive producer
- John Zorn – executive producer
- Heung-Heung Chin – design
- Heike Liss – photography

Source: Discogs.
