= Meltdown (Massacre album) =

Live album by Massacre
- Released: November 2001
- Recorded: June 17, 2001
- Venue: Queen Elizabeth Hall, London
- Genre: Avant-rock, free improvisation
- Length: 67:33
- Label: Tzadik (United States)
- Producer: Massacre

Massacre chronology
Funny Valentine (1998)	Meltdown (2001)	Lonely Heart (2007)

Meltdown is a 2001 live album by avant-rock, experimental power trio Massacre, featuring guitarist Fred Frith, bassist Bill Laswell and drummer Charles Hayward. It was recorded live at Robert Wyatt's 2001 Meltdown Festival in Queen Elizabeth Hall, London on June 17, 2001, and released by Tzadik Records as part of their "Key Series".

== Reception ==
Professional ratings
Review scores
Source	Rating
AllMusic	3/5 stars

In a review of Meltdown in AllMusic, Rick Anderson said the album comprises "typical group improv" made up largely of "patterns and alternating solos". He described Frith's guitar on "For Good and Scatter" as "gorgeous", and liked how "Figure Out" switches from "complex improvisatory interplay to an eerily beautiful ambient coda." Anderson stated that while Massacre's improvisations are well handled and never become "boring", "a few tightly composed numbers ... would have been nice." Overall, Anderson found Meltdown "slightly disappointing" by virtue of the high standard the group have set themselves, which would "constitute no wave genius on the part of any other band."

Writing in The Wire, Clive Bell described Meltdown as "Large scale power improv excitement." He called "Figure Out" "a great pleasure", adding that it "carves up chunks of raw noise, sounding simultaneously like crushed metal boxes and yowling birds, later drifting into a gentle bedtime dreamland."

== Track listing ==
All tracks composed by Massacre except where stated.

1. "Up For It / Song For Che / Closing Circles and Loose End" (Massacre/Charlie Haden) – 20:37
2. "Hover" – 3:48
3. "For Good and Scatter" – 10:25
4. "Figure Out" – 25:23
5. "The Empire Strikes Back" – 2:06
6. "Over" – 5:14

Source: AllMusic, Discogs.

== Personnel ==
Massacre

- Fred Frith – guitar
- Bill Laswell – bass guitars
- Charles Hayward – drums, voice, melodica

=== Sound ===
- Oz Fritz – engineer
- Massacre – producer

Source: Discogs.
