= Trefor Goronwy =

English musician (1960–2024)

Background information
- Also known as: Goronwy; Trefor Goronwi; Trefor Gorowny; Trevor Goronwy
- Born: Trefor J. Goronwy; August 23, 1960
- Died: February 2024 (age 63)
- Genres: Experimental rock; Avant-prog; Post-punk
- Instruments: Bass guitar, vocals, percussion, igil, kobyz, erdu
- Formerly of: This Heat; Camberwell Now

Trefor Goronwy (born Trevor J. Goronwy, 23 August 1960 – February 2024) was an English vocalist, bass guitarist, guitarist, and percussionist. He joined This Heat for their final European tour in 1982, and continued to work with drummer Charles Hayward and soundman Stephen Rickard in the group Camberwell Now. He also worked as a sound technician with groups such as Pere Ubu, Towering Inferno, David Thomas and Two Pale Boys, Spearmint, Momus and the Tuvan throat-singing ensemble Huun-Huur-Tu, whose first album he recorded in London. After several years spent in Russia, he worked on recordings featuring Tuvan and Kazakh traditional instruments, particularly the igil and kobyz. Goronwy was born in Northampton on 23 August 1960. His sister was self-help author Lynda Field (née Goronwy, 1952–2020). Trefor Goronwy died in February 2024, at the age of 63.

== Sources ==
- Trefor Goronwy discography at Discogs
- Trefor Goronwy | Listen and Stream Free Music, Albums, New Releases, Photos, Videos
- Camberwell Now at AllMusic
