= Laura Cannell =

British composer and musician

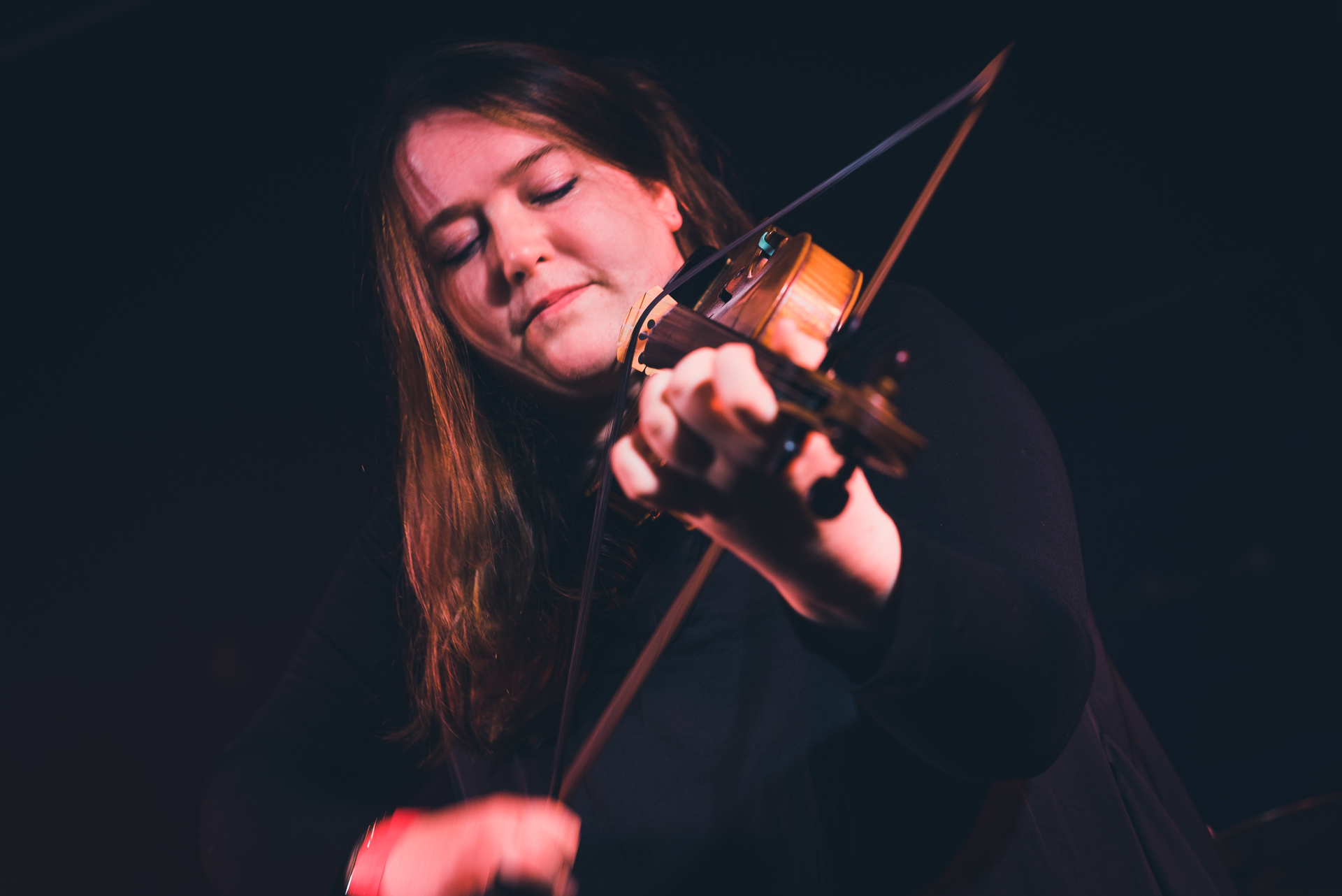

Background information
- Occupations: Composer; performer; producer
- Instruments: Recorder; violin
- Website: lauracannell.com

Laura Cannell is an English composer and improvising recorder player and violinist. Her work is known for combining the influences of early music, folk, drone music and experimental music. Her debut solo album Quick Sparrows over the Black Earth (2014), was named as a top album of 2014 by The Wire and her album Reckonings (in collaboration with violinist André Bosman) was named in the best albums and tracks of 2018 in The Guardian. Cannell's music has been frequently broadcast on BBC Radio 3, BBC Radio 4, BBC Radio 6Music, NTS Radio and internationally.

== Education and early life ==
Cannell was born in Norwich and studied at the London College of Music, before returning to Norfolk to complete a master's degree at the University of East Anglia and to begin her career as a performing musician.

== Horses Brawl (2003–2011) ==
Cannell founded the trio Horses Brawl in 2003, with guitarist Adrian Lever and cellist Jonathan Manton. Their eponymous debut album was released in 2005. The group was reduced to a duo (Cannell and Lever) by the time of the release of their second album, DINDIRIN (2007), which also featured veteran early musician Philip Thorby as guest performer on viol. Their third album, Wild Lament (2009), received favourable reviews from publications such as The Times and The Independent. The group reformed as a duo of Cannell and André Bosman for their final album to date, Ruminantia (2012).

The wide range of music on which the group drew included Bulgarian wedding music, songs from Renaissance Spain, English and French medieval music and European folk music, combined with unconventional instrumental extended techniques, such as bowed guitar and violin bow slackened to play all four strings at once. Cannell has since often employed the latter technique in her solo performances, together with the "double recorder" (two instruments played at once).

Horses Brawl appeared in live performances at venues including the Queen Elizabeth Hall and the Huddersfield Contemporary Music Festival, besides regular appearances at the Norwich Arts Centre.

== Solo career ==
Following the end of Horses Brawl, Cannell began working on solo improvisations, initially based on fragments of medieval music, such as the work of Hildegard of Bingen, looped and varied, and performed in churches in rural Norfolk. Cannell subsequently combined her material with these early sources, resulting in "music that has one foot in the loops of Steve Reich and John Adams, the other in the melodies of moorland England and medieval Europe".

Cannell's engagement with the historical and emotional associations of spaces and geographical locations has led to The Quietus stating that "it is becoming hard to imagine flatlands and flinty churches without also thinking of Cannell’s music playing as a soundtrack".

She has also performed at venues and festivals including ATP, Café Oto, the Royal Festival Hall and the Barbican Centre.

Cannell also performs in the trio Oscilanz, together with Ralph Cumbers and Charles Hayward of the experimental rock band, This Heat and with fellow improvising violinist Angharad Davies as Mythos of Violins. Other collaborative work has included projects with the BBC Philharmonic, and a series of new music and spoken word performances, Modern Ritual, which Cannell curated on a UK tour in 2018.

== Recordings ==
Cannell's recordings frequently exploit the acoustics of resonant spaces, such as the ruined St Andrew's Church, Covehithe, Suffolk on her album Hunter, Huntress, Hawker (2017), Southwold Lighthouse on her album Simultaneous Flight Movement (2016) and St Andrew's Church, Raveningham, Norfolk on The Sky Untuned (2019).

Her discography also includes a collaborative album with improvising harpist Rhodri Davies, Feathered Swing of the Raven (2012) and a collaboration with East Anglian singer and performer Polly Wright, Sing as the Crow Flies (2019), inspired by the lost voices of women in the folktales of Norfolk as well as its marshland landscapes. This was Cannell's first release featuring her as a vocal performer. These recordings also form part of an installation at the annual Waveney Valley Sculpture Trail in August 2019 at Raveningham, where the album was recorded in the village church.

In November 2019, Whistling Arrow, a sextet comprising Ex-Easter Island Head, Laura Cannell, André Bosman and Charles Hayward, released an album via God Unknown records.

In 2020 Cannell released the album The Earth With Her Crowns, recorded inside the disused Wapping Hydraulic Power Station.
