= Gareth Williams (British musician) =

British musician (1953–2001)

- Williams performing with This Heat in 1981
- Born: 23 April 1953; Cardiff, Wales
- Died: 24 December 2001 (aged 48)
- Occupations: musician; bassist and vocalist for This Heat
- Partner: Nick Goodall

Gareth Williams (23 April 1953 – 24 December 2001) was a British musician best remembered as the bassist and vocalist for the experimental rock group This Heat.

== Career summary ==
Gareth John Williams was born in Cardiff, Wales on 23 April 1953. He was educated at Greenshaw High School in Sutton, Surrey. Before concentrating full-time on his studies for his A-level tests, he spent a period of time in Newfoundland, Canada. By the mid-1970s he was working in a London record shop. An avid record collector, Williams made himself known to drummer Charles Hayward and guitarist Charles Bullen. This eventually led to the formation of the band This Heat where Williams proved to be an excellent lyricist and musician and a maniacal but intuitive performer on bass guitar and keyboards.

=== This Heat ===
The band's experimentalism, despite steering them away from more mainstream success, anticipated several experimental and alternative styles and built up a solid base of passionate admirers. They shunned musical technique in favor of what they called "accidents." They played their first concert in Feb 1976, only days after their formation. During the early days improvisation dominated their performances, but gradually they encompassed both abstract and formal stylings in their music, where trance-like soundscapes merged into violent yet danceable anthems with cascades of noise punctuated by abrupt silence.

In 1977 John Peel featured them on his BBC Radio 1 show. This Heat's performance proved an intoxicating hybrid of music played exceptionally noisily, usually in complete darkness, with a proto-punk attitude. Their first album, titled This Heat (1979), was two years in the making. The maxi-single Health and Efficiency (1980) permitted Williams to demonstrate his now considerable skill.

Their second album Deceit (1981) was to follow, but by then Williams had taken a sabbatical from the band as noted in the booklet accompanying their first major reissue Out of Cold Storage (2006).

=== Going to India ===
Williams went on to study Kathakali dance drama in Kerala in southern India. He also was to co-author the first Rough Guide to India whilst studying Indian religion and music at London University's School of Oriental and African Studies.

=== Flaming Tunes ===
After returning from India, Williams in 1985 created Flaming Tunes with friend Mary Currie. The music was short, with raw and sorrowful songs, released in a hand-coloured cassette package. It was never intended as a "demo tape for The Heat" as a subsequent bootleg CD quoted, bringing much distress to Williams. The album was re-mastered and placed on CD in a total package in 2009. In 2020 the American record label Superior Viaduct re-released the album, reusing the original Contagious Records artwork.

During this time in the mid-80s Williams lived in Balham sharing a house with the archaeologist Peter James, author of Centuries of Darkness, was involved in the Greater London Council funded community cultural group Common Lore, with amongst other storytellers Kevin Graal and Helen East and drummer Rick Wilson.

=== Mind the Gap ===
During the 1990s Williams briefly joined his This Heat bandmate Charles Hayward in the avant-rock band Mind the Gap. He also was to feature in Hayward's monthly "Accidents & Emergencies" series at the Deptford Albany Empire. Williams went on to be a promoter, and as a DJ and he recorded zealously at home with the singer Viv Corringham and also with This Heat's original sound engineer Martin Harrison.

=== Death ===
Williams had been ill for a few years but died of cancer on 24 December 2001, aged 48. Williams was survived by his partner, Nick Goodall, who died in 2007. Nick Goodall took the photograph on the cover of the This Heat album Deceit.
