= This Heat =

English rock band

- Left to right: Charles Hayward, Gareth Williams, Charles Bullen

Background information
- Origin: Camberwell, London, England
- Genres: Experimental rock; post-punk
- Years active: 1976–1982; 2016–2019; (as This Is Not This Heat)
- Labels: This Is; Piano; Rough Trade
- Spinoffs: Camberwell Now
- Past members: Charles Bullen; Charles Hayward; Gareth Williams; Trefor Goronwy; Ian Hill; James Sedwards; Alex Ward; Daniel O'Sullivan; Frank Byng

This Heat were an English experimental rock band, formed in early 1976 in Camberwell, London by multi-instrumentalists Charles Bullen (guitar, clarinet, viola, vocals, tapes), Charles Hayward (drums, keyboards, vocals, tapes) and Gareth Williams (keyboard, guitar, bass, vocals, tapes).

This Heat were active during the ascendancy of British punk, but stood apart from that scene due to an experimental and confrontational approach. This Heat's commercial success was limited and, during the group’s existence, their discography consisted of only two albums and an EP. The band would influence genres such as post-punk, industrial music, and post-rock.

Williams died of cancer in 2001. From 2016 until 2019, Bullen and Hayward reunited, playing under the name This Is Not This Heat.

== History ==
This Heat were formed in 1976 by Charles Hayward and Charles Bullen. Hayward was previously a member of the progressive rock band Quiet Sun, fronted by guitarist Phil Manzanera of Roxy Music, and had been rehearsing with Bullen in several improvisational music groups on the London scene such as Radar Favourites and Dolphin Logic. In 1975, Quiet Sun reformed to record the album Mainstream, which was critically acclaimed and became the New Musical Express' album of the month, and Island Records' fourth or fifth biggest seller at the time, close to sales figures of Bad Company and Cat Stevens. Whilst on tour to support the album, Manzanera was called up to work on the next Roxy Music album, so Bullen was brought in to complete the rest of the tour dates. Quiet Sun dissolved shortly afterwards, but Bullen and Hayward, whose bond had grown over the tour, decided to continue working together.

Soon after, the pair were joined by Gareth Williams, a clerk at a local record shop who, despite his lack of formal musical training, had an intuitive ear for sound. Hayward had also hoped to bring Quiet Sun bassist Bill MacCormick on board; MacCormick however, declined due to personality clashes between him and Williams. Under the name Friendly Rifles, the trio performed their first gig at the Three Horseshoes, Hampstead on February 13, 1976. They eventually settled upon This Heat in reference to the 1976 British Isles heat wave, regarded at the time as the hottest summer on record. Hayward also stated the name had existed in Williams' subconscious since the 1960s, when he was a member of a youth gang called 'Fly Wire', whose rivals were known as 'This Heat'.

This Heat's first radio airplay came in early 1977 from legendary DJ John Peel, to whom they sent a demo tape recorded in the top room at Hayward's parents' house in Camberwell, prior to moving into Cold Storage, formerly the cold store room of a meat pie factory, which they converted into a studio as part of the Acme artists studios complex in Brixton. During this time, they also recorded a session with Ghanaian percussionist Mario Boyer Diekuuroh, parts of which later appeared on a 1982 split cassette with Albert Marcoeur, released by the French experimental rock magazine Tago Mago.

Their self-titled debut album was recorded between February 1976 and September 1978 in various studios and venues, and was released in August 1979. It was characterised by heavy use of tape manipulation and looping (especially on the track "24 Track Loop", which essentially uses two-inch analog tape as a kind of primitive sampling device), combined with more traditional performance (including quite a lot of live stereo microphone in the room recordings) to create dense, eerie, electronic soundscapes. Despite acquiring a publishing deal from Blackhill Music Ltd. and receiving offers from several major labels to release the album, This Heat declined them all in order to maintain creative control and independence over their work. They were eventually swayed by their friend David Cunningham of The Flying Lizards, who released it through his independent label Piano. Shortly thereafter, This Heat released the Health and Efficiency EP, which foreshadowed the more rock-oriented sound of their subsequent album.

This Heat then signed a record deal with Rough Trade Records, who released Deceit, the band's second and final album, in 1981. Whilst maintaining their experimental approach, Deceit found the band incorporating more coherent song structures, and consolidating the dub and world music influences in their work. The album was produced with help from noted reggae mixer Martin Frederick. Although at the time, like all of This Heat's releases, it sold poorly, Deceit is now seen as a classic of the post-punk era. By that time Deceit was released, Williams had exited from the band, departing for India to study kathakali.

This Heat split up in 1982 after completing their final European tour with bassist-vocalist Trefor Goronwy and keyboardist Ian Hill joining Bullen and Hayward. Hayward went on to form Camberwell Now with Goronwy and Stephen Rickard, and remains musically active. Bullen went on to collaborate with bassist and percussionist Dub Judah on a solo venture called Lifetones, releasing an album entitled For a Reason in 1983 on his Tone of Life imprint, and in 1998 he released the album Internal Clock under the name Circadian Rhythms. Williams later formed Flaming Tunes with Mary Currie and released a cassette of material, which was later released on CD.

In 1993 a new album of previously unreleased This Heat recordings was unearthed entitled Repeat. It featured three long ambient tracks, including the title track, "Metal", and a 33 rpm version of "Graphic/Varispeed". Out of Cold Storage, a box set of all the band's official recordings, was released in June 2006 on This is!, a new Recommended Records sub-label set up by Hayward and Bullen to re-release This Heat's back catalogue. The set comprises This Heat, Deceit, Health and Efficiency, Made Available and Repeat, plus Live 80/81, a CD of concert recordings.

In December 2001 This Heat tentatively rehearsed (with Williams); however, nothing came to fruition as Williams died later that month of cancer.

In 2016, Bullen and Hayward reunited under the name This Is Not This Heat to perform a number of critically acclaimed gigs in London. The concerts featured several guests such as Thurston Moore, Alexis Taylor, Alex Ward and Daniel O'Sullivan. The reunion continued across the following three years, concluding with a small series of shows in London, New York, and Los Angeles in 2019.

In August 2020, This Heat released part of its catalogue digitally on streaming services, including Bandcamp.

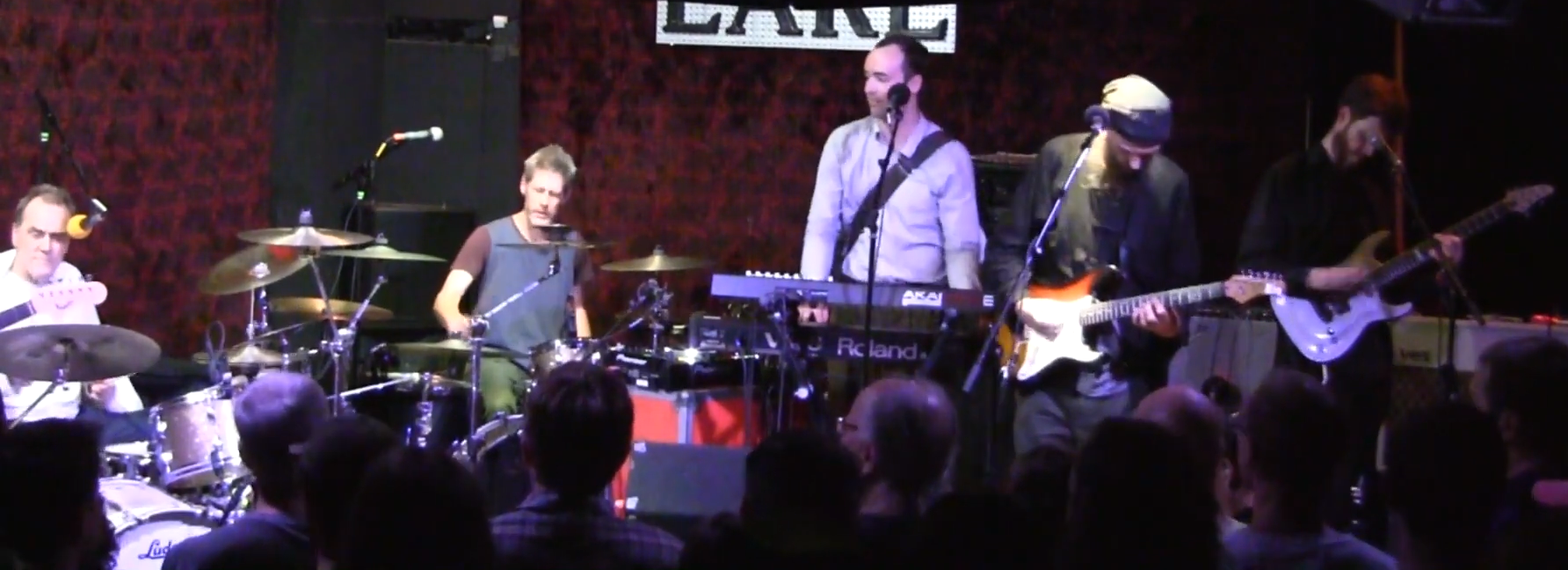
This Is Not This Heat performing in Atlanta, 2019. Left to right: Sedwards (obscured), Hayward, Byng, O'Sullivan, Bullen, Ward

== Legacy ==
=== Influence ===
Bands and artists that have called This Heat either an influence or a favourite include Steve Albini, Alexis Taylor, Dan Snaith, Avey Tare, Amen Dunes, Women, Preoccupations, Nurse With Wound, Palm, Squid, Mark Stewart, The Dead C, Daniel O'Sullivan, Dean Blunt, Disco Inferno, Elias Rønnenfelt, Marc Hollander, Family Fodder, Matt Johnson, 23 Skidoo, David Grubbs, Volcano the Bear, Dazzling Killmen, Nisennenmondai, Korekyojinn, Steven Wilson, The Sound of Animals Fighting, Yoshida Tatsuya, 75 Dollar Bill, Horse Lords, Mika Taanila, FRIGS, Warm Ghost, Justin Pearson, Bo Ningen, Pinkish Black, Young Knives, AIDS Wolf, Controlled Bleeding, These New Puritans, Eyeless in Gaza, Six Finger Satellite, Trans Am, Dave Kerman, Guapo, Chrome Hoof, Ut, Heiner Goebbels, and many others.

In addition, numerous critics recognised the band's influence on the music of Sonic Youth, Glenn Branca, Public Image Ltd., Radiohead, Swans, Black Dice, Stereolab, Gang Gang Dance, Lightning Bolt, C. Spencer Yeh, Liars, Black Midi and several other experimental and post-rock bands.

== Members ==
- Charles Bullen – guitar, vocals (1976–1982, 2001, 2016–2019) clarinet, viola, tapes (1976–1982)
- Gareth Williams – bass, keyboards, guitar, tapes, vocals (1976–1981, 2001; died 2001)
- Charles Hayward – drums, percussion, vocals (1976–1982, 2001, 2016–2019), melodica (2016–2019), keyboards, tapes (1976–1982)
- Trefor Goronwy – bass, vocals (1981–1982)
- Ian Hill – keyboards (1981–1982)
- James Sedwards – guitar (2016–2019)
- Alex Ward – guitar, clarinet, vocals (2016–2019)
- Daniel O'Sullivan – bass, keyboards, vocals (2016–2019)
- Frank Byng – percussion, drums (2016–2019)

=== Timeline ===
Note: Additional collaborators such as Thurston Moore and Alexis Taylor played with This is Not This Heat, although sporadically across individual dates. This chart only documents the core members of the reunion lineup.

== Discography ==
=== Studio albums ===
- This Heat (1979)
- Deceit (1981)

=== EPs ===
- Health and Efficiency (1980)
- The Peel Sessions (1988)

=== Live ===
- This Heat Live (1986; cassette-only release of 1980 Krefeld concert)
- Scala (2006; bootleg 1979 London concert)
- Final Revelations (2007; final 1982 concert plus songs from Solo Projects from each bandmember respectively)
- Live at I.C.A. Club 1980 (2007; bootleg of concert at London's Institute of Contemporary Arts)

=== Compilations ===
- Made Available: John Peel Sessions (1996; reissue of The Peel Sessions with bonus tracks)
- Out of Cold Storage (2006; 6-CD box set)

=== Various artist compilation appearances ===
- Recommended Records Sampler (1982)

=== Other releases ===
- This Heat with Mario Boyer Diekuuroh (1982; split cassette with Albert Marcoeur)
- Repeat (1993)
- John Peel Shows (2005; bootleg of 1977 preview of first album demos)
- Face Hand Shy: Rarities (2006; above Peel demos plus "Health & Efficiency", Mario Boyer Diekuuroh tracks and undated live tracks)
