= Funny Valentine =

Studio album by Massacre
- Released: 1998
- Recorded: January 1998
- Studio: Orange Music, West Orange, New Jersey
- Genre: Experimental rock
- Length: 61:17
- Label: Tzadik (United States)
- Producer: Massacre

Massacre chronology
Killing Time (1981)	Funny Valentine (1998)	Meltdown (2001)

Funny Valentine is the second studio album by avant-rock, experimental trio Massacre, recorded 17 years after the first. For this album guitarist Fred Frith and bass guitarist Bill Laswell were joined by English drummer Charles Hayward, who replaced original drummer Fred Maher.

Funny Valentine was recorded at Laswell's studio, Orange Music, in West Orange, New Jersey in January 1998.

== Reception ==
Professional ratings
Review scores
Source	Rating
AllMusic	4/5 stars

In a review at AllMusic, Rick Anderson stated that Funny Valentine is a little "weak" at the beginning but improves as the album progresses. He said some of the tracks display "the sense of humor that animated so much of Killing Time". Anderson opined that Funny Valentine is "great", but not "quite as great" as Massacre's first album. He felt that it needs "a little more discipline and a little less length, but not much more discipline and not too much less length".

== Track listing ==
All tracks are written by Massacre.

No.	Title	Length
1.	"Leaf Violence"	4:43
2.	"Down to Five a Day"	4:42
3.	"Lizard-skin Junk-mail"	5:26
4.	"Ladder"	11:30
5.	"South Orange Sunset"	4:13
6.	"Six-cylinder Sinister"	5:21
7.	"300 Days in the Vacant Lot"	7:34
8.	"Say Hey Willie"	2:14
9.	"Talk Radio"	3:48
10.	"Well-dressed Ripping up Wood"	4:22
11.	"Further Conversations with White Arc"	6:24

Source: AllMusic, Discogs.

== Personnel ==
Massacre

- Fred Frith – guitar
- Bill Laswell – bass guitars
- Charles Hayward – drums

=== Sound and artwork ===
- Robert Musso – engineer
- Allan Tucker – mastering
- Massacre – producer
- Kazunori Sugiyama – associate executive producer
- John Zorn – executive producer
- Ikue Mori – design
- Adolf Wölfli – artwork

Source: Discogs.
