= This Heat (album) =

Studio album by This Heat
- Released: September 1979
- Recorded: 1976–1978
- Studios: The Workhouse Studios, Old Kent Road; Cold Storage, Brixton
- Genres: Experimental rock; post-punk
- Length: 48:25
- Label: Piano
- Producers: Anthony Moore; David Cunningham; This Heat

This Heat chronology
This Heat (1979)	Health and Efficiency (1980)

This Heat is the debut studio album by English experimental rock band This Heat. Recorded between 1976 and 1978, it was released in September 1979 by record label Piano.

== Reception ==
Professional ratings
Review scores
Source	Rating
All About Jazz	5/5 stars
AllMusic	4.5/5 stars
Cokemachineglow	93%
The Great Alternative & Indie Discography	8/10
Mojo	4/5 stars
Pitchfork	9.0/10
PopMatters	9/10
Record Mirror	4/5 stars
Sounds	4/5 stars
Uncut	9/10

In a contemporary review for NME, Andy Gill wrote: "For much of This Heat's album, it's difficult and at times impossible to decipher which instrument is playing what. This is some indication of their intentions, and the way This Heat set about realising those intentions." Vivien Goldman, writing in Melody Maker, remarked that This Heat "takes you to ten movies in the space of a one-year-old album". NME listed it as the 35th best album of 1979.

== Legacy ==
Retrospectively, Dean McFarlane of AllMusic wrote: "There are very few records that can be considered truly important, landmark works of art that produce blueprints for an entire genre. In the case of this album, it's clear that this seminal work was integral in shaping the genres of post-punk, avant rock and post-rock, and like all great influential albums, it seemed it had to wait two decades before its contents could truly be fathomed." Peter Marsh of BBC Music called it "one of the strongest and strangest debut records of all time. Seemingly born out of the fervent experimentalism of the UK post-punk scene, This Heat's beautifully skewed mix of improvisation, lo-fi tapework and stretched, ghostly songform actually had more in common with maverick longhairs like Henry Cow and Faust. [...] The music here seethes with an economy, invention and power that still shocks a quarter of a century on." Steven Grant of Trouser Press wrote: "Though insolent and withdrawn, the music is adventurous and, in its own peculiar way, engrossing."

Pitchfork included the song "24 Track Loop" on their list of the "Greatest 500 Songs from Punk to the Present".

== Track listing ==
All tracks composed by This Heat.

No.	Title	Length
1.	"Testcard"	0:47
2.	"Horizontal Hold"	6:56
3.	"Not Waving"	7:26
4.	"Water"	3:10
5.	"Twilight Furniture"	5:06
6.	"24 Track Loop"	5:57
7.	"Diet of Worms"	3:09
8.	"Music Like Escaping Gas"	3:40
9.	"Rainforest"	2:55
10.	"The Fall of Saigon"	5:10
11.	"Testcard"	4:09
Total length:		48:25

== Personnel ==
This Heat

- Charles Bullen – vocals, guitar, clarinet, drums, tapes
- Charles Hayward – vocals, drums, keyboards, guitar, bass guitar, tapes
- Gareth Williams – vocals, bass guitar, keyboards, tapes

Technical

- This Heat – production, engineering
- Chris Blake – engineering
- Frank Bryan – engineering
- David Cunningham – production, engineering
- Kevin Harrison – engineering
- Anthony Moore – production
- Rik Walton – engineering
