= The Flying Lizards =

English new wave band

- Origin: United Kingdom
- Genres: Post-punk; new wave; art pop
- Years active: 1976–1984
- Labels: Virgin, Statik
- Past members: Rory Allam; David Cunningham; Steve Beresford; Bob Black; Deborah Evans-Stickland; Robert Fripp; Vivien Goldman; Peter Laurence Gordon; Julian Marshall; Patti Palladin; Sally Peterson; David Toop; Michael Upton

The Flying Lizards were an experimental English new wave band, formed in 1976. They are best known for their eccentric cover version of Barrett Strong's "Money", featuring Deborah Evans-Stickland on lead vocals, which reached the UK and North American record charts in 1979. They followed this with their self-titled album that year, which reached number 60 on the UK Albums Chart.

== Career ==
Formed and led by record producer David Cunningham, the group were a loose collective of avant-garde and freely improvising musicians, including David Toop and Steve Beresford as instrumentalists, with Deborah Evans-Stickland, Patti Palladin and Vivien Goldman as main vocalists.

In August 1979 the Flying Lizards appeared twice on the BBC's Top of the Pops performing their hit single "Money (That's What I Want)". They also appeared in February 1980, performing the follow-up single "TV". Virgin Records extended the band's recording contract after the success of "Money". The group released their début album The Flying Lizards in 1979. The album included two songs – "Her Story" and "The Window" – written and sung by Goldman. Their single issues included their postmodern cover versions of songs such as Eddie Cochran's "Summertime Blues" and "Money".

The 1981 album Fourth Wall received praise from critics but did not sell well. Top Ten (1984), with vocalist Sally Peterson, released by Statik records, consisted entirely of covers, done in a similarly deliberately emotionless, and robotic, style (described by the NME at the time as "Sloane Rap"), including two singles, James Brown's "Sex Machine" and "Dizzy, Miss Lizzy", as well as an album track of Leonard Cohen's "Suzanne". Cunningham and Peterson worked together on music production for film and advertising after Top Ten was released, including a re-recording of "Money".

The Flying Lizards' version of Barrett Strong's "Money" remained popular, and was used in the film soundtracks for The Wedding Singer, Empire Records, Charlie's Angels and Lord of War, as well as in the Emmy and Golden Globe award-winning American television medical drama Nip/Tuck, documentary series People's Century, and in Ashes to Ashes, the follow-up to the UK TV drama Life on Mars. It was also used in the episode "Venus Rising" of WKRP in Cincinnati, the episode "Follow the Money" of Family Guy, and in a commercial for Taco Bell in 2011.

An album of dub instrumentals, The Secret Dub Life of the Flying Lizards, recorded by David Cunningham mostly in 1978, was finally released in 1995. The first two albums, The Flying Lizards and Fourth Wall, were re-released by RPM in 2010, with the catalogue number RETROD883.

"Money" was the band's only single to reach the UK top 40.

== Band members ==
- David Toop
- Steve Beresford
- Michael Upton
- Julian Marshall
- Michael Nyman
- David Cunningham
- Vivien Goldman
- Robert Fripp
- Bob Black
- Deborah Evans-Stickland
- Patti Palladin
- Peter Laurence Gordon
- Sally Peterson
- Rory Allam

== Discography ==
=== Albums ===
Year	Album	Chart positions				Label
Year	Album	UK	AUS	CAN	US	Label
1979	The Flying Lizards	60	37	80	99	Virgin
1981	Fourth Wall	—	—	—	—	Virgin
1984	Top Ten	—	—	—	—	Statik
1996	The Secret Dub Life of the Flying Lizards	—	—	—	—	Piano Records
"—" denotes releases that did not chart.

=== Singles ===
Year	Title	Peak chart positions				Certifications
Year	Title	UK	AUS	CAN	US	Certifications
1978	"Summertime Blues"	―	75	―	―	
1979	"Money"	5	11	7	50	BPI: Silver
1980	"TV"	43	―	―	―	
1980	"The Laughing Policeman" (as The Suspicions)	―	―	―	―	
1980	"Move On Up"	―	―	―	―	
1981	"Hands 2 Take" (with Michael Nyman)	―	―	―	―	
1981	"Lovers and Other Strangers"	―	―	―	―	
1984	"Sex Machine"	―	―	―	―	
1984	"Dizzy, Miss Lizzy"	―	―	―	―	
"—" denotes releases that did not chart or were not released in that territory.

== See also ==
- List of new wave artists
- List of performers on Top of the Pops
- List of post-punk bands
