= Laurie-Rae Chamberlain =

Laurie-Rae Chamberlain (born 1950), whose name is sometimes styled as Laurie Rae Chamberlain, is a color Xerox artist and graphic designer from Great Britain best known for his work on music album, magazine, and book covers. He was active in the British art and fashion world during the mid-1970s and 1980s before falling out of public life.

Chamberlain is a graduate of the Royal College of Art. An early adopter of the color Xerox art form, he exhibited at the Institute of Contemporary Arts in the late 1970s and the Biennial of European Graphic Arts in the early 1980s. He even served as an informal ambassador for color xerography, doing a live demonstration for the BBC in 1982 and publishing a book called Zen and the Art of Color Xerography the same year.

More recently, his work was included in a retrospective exhibition on xerography at Firstsite in 2013, as well as part of a group show on 20th-century British performance, music and graphic design in 2019. Prints by Chamberlain are in the collections of the National Gallery of Australia, the British Museum, and the Victoria and Albert Museum. His artwork also appears on the covers of a 1979 eponymous album by the Flying Lizards and a 1981 album by This Heat, and in the video of the song Zerox, by Adam and the Ants, stills of which appeared on the sleeve for the single Cartrouble.

Chamberlain also filmed early gigs and rehearsals by the Ants in 1977–1978 on silent 8mm film which were later edited into a short film which circulated among Ant's fans from the 1980s onwards under the title Jackson Pollack.

In addition to his Xerox art work, Chamberlain competed in the Alternative Miss World contest in 1975 and served as a gossip columnist and fashion editor of the International Times in 1977.
