= David Cunningham (musician) =

British composer and record producer

- Born: 20 December 1954 (age 71); Armagh, Northern Ireland
- Occupations: composer, music producer
- Years active: 1976-present
- Known for: The Flying Lizards
- Notable work: The Listening Room; A Piano In a Gallery

David Cunningham (born 20 December 1954) is a composer and record producer from Northern Ireland. His first significant success came with The Flying Lizards' single 'Money', an international hit in 1979.

Cunningham was born in Armagh on 20 December 1954. Between 1973 and 1977 he attended Maidstone College of Art, in Maidstone in Kent. In 1976 he released Grey Scale, a LP of pieces in minimalist idiom, as part of his Degree show. The cover was from fellow student and video artist, Stephen Partridge with whom he made a number of collaborations over the next 20 years. Cunningham has worked as a musician and record producer, engaging with an eclectic range of people and music, from bands such as This Heat, Palais Schaumburg to improvisers (David Toop, Steve Beresford) to Michael Nyman's music for Peter Greenaway's films.

From about 1993, Cunningham began to make installations in which sounds within an architectural space were picked up by a microphone and then fed back into the space; the presence of an audience altered both the shape of the space and the sounds within it. A work of this type, The Listening Room, was installed in the Queen's Powder Magazine on Goat Island in Sydney Harbour during the Sydney Biennale of 1998.

Film and television work has included two long continuing collaborations - with William Raban, recently '72-82', 'London Republic' and 'Available Light' and with Ken McMullen, most recently with 'Οχί An Act of Resistance' and McMullen's earlier films 'Being and Doing', 'Zina' and (alongside Michael Giles and Jamie Muir) 'Ghost Dance'. Related work has included the production and treatment of sound for installation and broadcast artworks by Susan Hiller, Cerith Wyn Evans, Laure Prouvost, Martin Creed, Amikam Toren, João Penalva, Ceal Floyer, Ian Breakwell, Gillian Wearing, Thomas Demand, Sam Taylor-Johnson, John Latham, David Hall, Stephen Partridge, Bruce McLean, Tony Sinden, Brad Butler and Karen Mirza and many others.

== Recordings ==
=== as producer ===
- This Heat (Piano Records, 1979)
- Things Your Mother Never Told You (Safari Records, 1979)
- Palais Schaumburg (Phonogram Records, 1981)

=== The Flying Lizards ===
- The Flying Lizards (Virgin Records, 1980) (UK No. 60, US No. 99)
- Fourth Wall (Virgin Records 1981)
- Top Ten (Statik, 1984)
- The Secret Dub Life of the Flying Lizards (Piano Records, 1996) (vinyl re-release, Staubgold, 2010)
- The Flying Lizards & Fourth Wall (re-release, RPM Records, 2010)

=== Solo ===
- Grey Scale (piano 001, 1976)
- Zina - film soundtrack (Filmtrax MOMENT 103,1986)
- Terminus - film soundtrack (Carrere – 66416, 1987)
- Voiceworks (eva WWCX 2041, 1992, re-released as piano 505)
- Water (MTM, 1992)
- ext.night (piano 507, 1997)
- Novembre (Editions Circuit, 2008)
