= Charles Hayward (drummer) =

British drummer (born 1951)

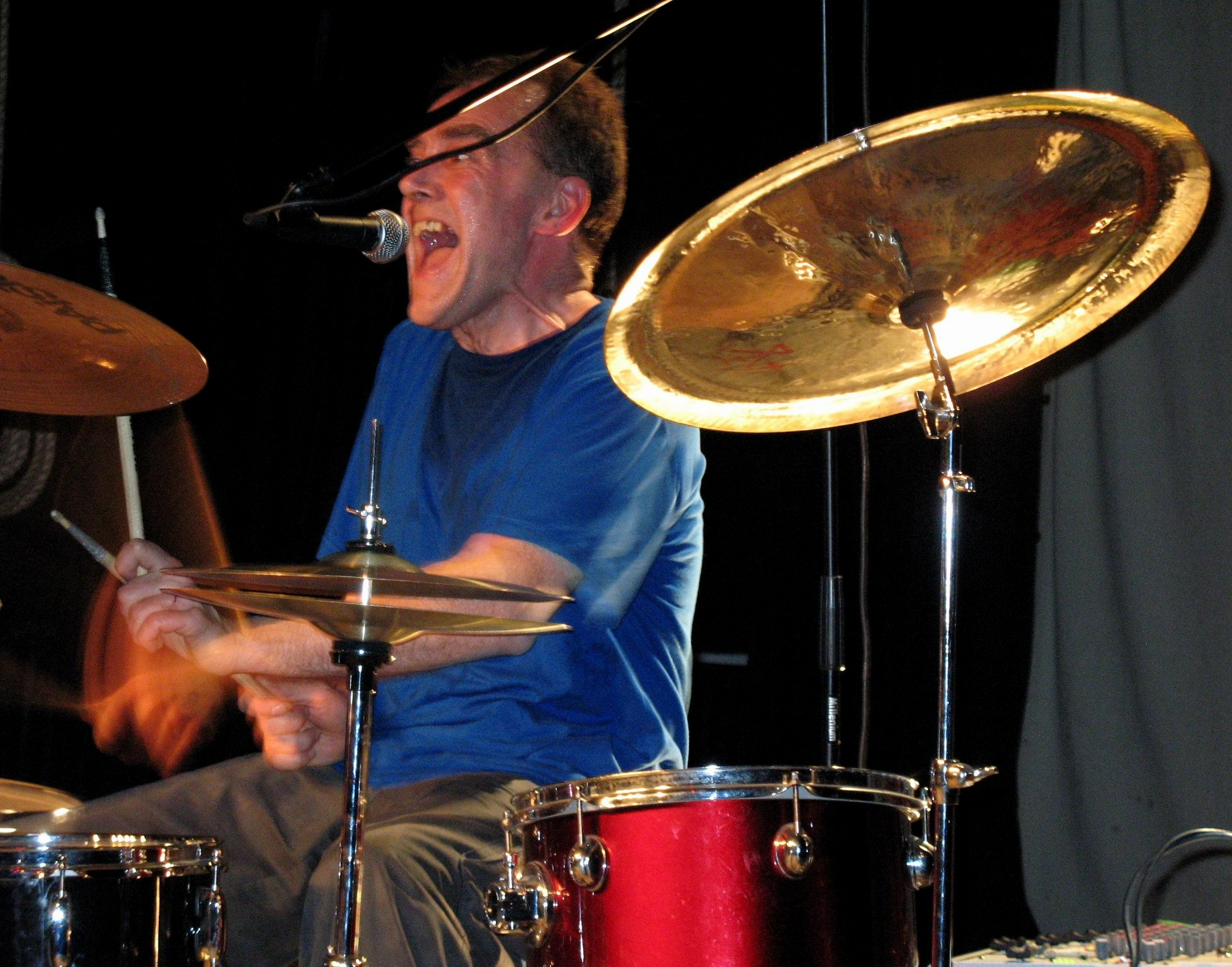
- Hayward in Limerick, Ireland in 2007

Background information
- Born: 1951 (age 74–75)
- Genre: Experimental rock
- Occupations: Composer, musician
- Instruments: Drums, vocals, keyboards
- Years active: 1970–present
- Formerly of: Gong; This Heat; Camberwell Now; Crass; Massacre; Blurt; About Group

Charles Hayward (born 1951) is an English drummer and was a founding member of the experimental rock groups This Heat and Camberwell Now. He also played with Mal Dean's Amazing Band, Dolphin Logic, and gigged and recorded with Phil Manzanera in the group Quiet Sun project as well as a short stint with Gong. He was a session musician on The Raincoats' second album, Odyshape, and on one occasion played drums for the anarchist punk band Crass. Since the late 1980s, Hayward has released several solo projects and participated in various collaborations, most notably Massacre with Bill Laswell and Fred Frith.

== Career ==
In 1976, Hayward and fellow musician Charles Bullen began practising with bassist Gareth Williams under the name This Heat. They began to experiment with tape loops, found sounds and keyboards on several sessions (recorded from 1976 to 1978, but not released until 1979). Finally, in 1979, This Heat released their self-titled debut album. 1981's Deceit marked the final new album from This Heat, Williams leaving just after its release. While Bullen began working as a studio engineer, Hayward did sessions for Lora Logic, The Raincoats and Everything but the Girl before forming Camberwell Now with bassist Trefor Goronwy and tape manipulator Stephen Rickard. The trio released 2 eps Meridian, Greenfingers and 1 album The Ghost Trade through the Swiss Recommended label.

When Camberwell Now disbanded in 1987 Hayward embarked on a solo career which has continued to the present day. He debuted with Survive the Gesture (1987), Skew-whiff (1989) Switch on War (1991) and My Secret Alphabet (with Nick Doyne-Ditmas) in 1993. Three live albums recorded in Japan followed in the late 1990s (released on Japanese label Locus Solus). In 2003 Abracadabra Information was released and 2011 saw the release of ONE BIG ATOM. In 1998, he joined Massacre with Fred Frith and Bill Laswell.

Throughout the 1990s up to the present he has initiated a large number of events and performances, including the series Accidents + Emergencies at the Albany Theatre in Deptford; Out of Body Orchestra; music made using sounds from the construction of the new Laban Dance Centre (now the Trinity Laban Conservatoire of Music and Dance), which was choreographed for the institution's official opening; music for a circus (part of the National Theatre's 'Art of Regeneration' initiative); and the full-on installation/performance Anti-Clockwise (with Ashleigh Marsh and David Aylward) for multiple strobes, maze structure of diverse textures, 2 drummers, synthesizers and your nervous system. Recent developments include the CONTINUITY evenings as part of Camberwell Arts. Over the past ten years Hayward has developed these attitudes and insights into a wide range of soundwork, both collaboratively and as a solo artist/performer. These include 30 Minute Snare Drum Roll, Zigzag+Swirl, a solo song set at the drums using a system of controlled chance electronics, beginanywhere a set of songs centred around the piano, collaborations with Laura Cannell, Thurston Moore, Keiji Haino amongst many others. Recent work with the Islington Mill crew in the project Anonymous Bash has led to new work with many younger players, including Harmergeddon, Data Quack (with Ben Vince, Merlin Nova and Coby Sey) and projects for an array of new record labels including Samarbeta, Care in the Community and Unknown Gods. He also releases material on his own label Continuity..... His long term relationship with the Albany continues with a twice yearly series of performances, workshops and installation, sound is sound is sound which he curates on behalf of Lewisham Arthouse.

In 2019 Whistling Arrow - a sextet comprising three members of Ex-Easter Island Head, Laura Cannell, André Bosman and Charles Hayward published an album out on 22 November via God Unknown records.

As well as his solo performance, Hayward's recent projects include:

- Albert Newton with Harry Beckett, John Edwards and Pat Thomas has been playing since its first performance at Accidents and Emergencies in the mid-1990s.
- In 1998, he joined Massacre with Fred Frith and Bill Laswell.
- Clear Frame with Lol Coxhill, Hugh Hopper and Orphy Robinson
- Mathilde 253 with Han-earl Park and Ian Smith
- Monkey Puzzle Trio with Viv Corringham (vocals/electronics) and Nick Doyne-Ditmas (double bass). An album White World was scheduled for release in September 2010 on the Slowfoot label.
- About Group with John Coxon, Pat Thomas and Alexis Taylor
- Oscilanz with Laura Cannell and Ralph Cumbers (aka Bass Clef)
- V4V with DJ BPM, Nick Doyne-Ditmas and Vern Edwards
- Whistling Arrow with Laura Cannell, Ex-Easter Island Head and André Bosman
- Abstract Concrete with Agathe Max, Otto Willberg, Roberto Sassi, and Yoni Silver

== Personal life ==
Hayward's wife worked as a film editor. Their three children are Lewis (b. 1987), Merlin (b. 1992) and Riley (b. 1996).

== Discography ==
=== Albums ===
- Survive the Gesture (1987) Sub Rosa
- Skew Whiff – A Tribute to Mark Rothko (1990) Sub Rosa
- Switch on War (1991) Sub Rosa
- Escape From Europe – Live in Japan vol 1 (1996) Locus Solus
- Double Agent(s) – Live in Japan vol 2 (1999) Locus Solus
- Near + Far – Live in Japan vol 3 (1999) Locus Solus
- Abracadabra Information (2004) Locus Solus
- Live at Tone Deaf 10-27-11 (2012) Otoacoustic, 12xFile, MP3, Album, 320
- One Big Atom (2011) Continuity... Records
- Trademark Ground (2012) Otoacoustic, limited edition single sided LP, 300 copies
- Anonymous Bash (2014) Samarbeta Residency, LP + DVD
- Begin Anywhere (2019) God Unknown, LP

=== 12" singles ===
- Charles Hayward: Wash Rinse Spin c/w Michael Prime: Osculation (2000) These Records
- Smell of Metal (2014) ΚΕΜΑΛ 2 x 12"

=== 7" singles ===
- Charles Hayward: Out of Order c/w Beside (2008) Dot Dot Dot Music limited edition

=== DVD ===
- Charles Hayward, Peter Bromley: Charles Hayward Recorded (2007) 1968 Film Group DVD-V PAL

=== Albums as collaborator ===
see also Quiet Sun, This Heat, Camberwell Now, etc...

- Regular Music: Regular Music (1985) Rough Trade
- Charles Hayward, Gigi Masin: Les Nouvelles Musiques De Chambre Volume 2 (1989) Sub Rosa
- Keep the Dog: That House We Lived In (rec 1991, rel 2003) Fred Records
- Charles Hayward, Nick Doyne-Ditmas: My Secret Alphabet (1993) Sub Rosa
- La 1919 (Chris Cutler, Charles Hayward, Luciano Margorani, Piero Chianura and Roberto Zorzi): Jouer. Spielen. To Play (1994) Materiali Sonori
- Percy Howard, Charles Hayward, Fred Frith, Bill Laswell: Meridiem (1998) Materiali Sonori
- Massacre: Funny Valentine (1998) Tzadik Records
- Massacre: Meltdown (2001) Tzadik
- Lol Coxhill, Charles Hayward, Hugh Hopper, Orphy Robinson, guest cornet Robert Wyatt: Clear Frame (2007) Continuity... Records
- Massacre: Lonely Heart (2007) Tzadik
- Hugh Hopper, Simon Picard, Steve Franklin, Charles Hayward: Numero d'Vol (2007) Moonjune
- Phil Manzanera: Firebird V11 (2008) Expression Records
- Charles Hayward, John Coxon, Pat Thomas, Alexis Taylor: About (2009) Treader
- Hot Chip: One Life Stand contributed drums to tracks "Hand Me Down Your Love" and "One Life Stand" and drums and chorus vocals to "Slush" (2010) Parlophone
- GOL & Charles Hayward: GOL & Charles Hayward (2010) Planam
- Monkey Puzzle Trio (Charles Hayward, Nick Doyne-Ditmas, Viv Corringham): White World (2010) Slowfoot
- Mathilde 253 (Charles Hayward, Han-earl Park and Ian Smith) with Lol Coxhill: Mathilde 253 (2011) Slam Productions
- Massacre: Love Me Tender (2013) Tzadik
- John Coxon, Charles Hayward, Ashley Wales, Rupert Clervaux, Eben Bull, Beatrice Dillon: Disarm (2013) Lisson Gallery LP limited edition
- Monkey Puzzle Trio: The Pattern Familiar (2014) Slowfoot
- Uneven Eleven (Charles Hayward, Guy Segers, Kawabata Makoto): Live at Cafe Oto (2015) Sub Rosa
- V4V (Charles Hayward, Nick Doyne-Ditmas, others) in/out (2014) limited edition 8 disc CDR, 300 copies
- Charles Hayward, Thurston Moore: Improvisations (2017) Care in the Community
- Whistling Arrow: Whistling Arrow (2019) God Unknown
- Charles Hayward, Harmergeddon (Fae Harmer and Nathan Greywater) Hayward Versus Harmergeddon (2020) God Unknown
- Charles Hayward (with Sean O'Hagan, Orphy Robinson, Sharon Gal, Nick Doyne-Ditmas and others) Crossfade Estate (2020) Klanggallerie
- Charles Hayward x Dälek, HAYWARDxDÄLEK (2025) Relapse

=== Compilation albums as collaborator ===
- Charles Hayward, Nick Doyne-Ditmas: "Where Is Chaos Now" 20m 56s, track on compilation Chaos in Expansion (1993) Sub Rosa
- David Shea, Charles Hayward, Nûs: "the new world order, who decides ?" 8m 27s, "accidents & emergencies" 7m 12s, "no bones" 5m 02s, 3 tracks on compilation Sub Rosa Sessions Bari, October 1996 (1997) Sub Rosa

=== Compilation EPs as collaborator ===
- Raf And O: Time Machine EP track "Time Machine" + 3 remixes include "Time Machine" (Merlin & Charles Hayward new yEAR Mix) (2014)

== See also ==
- Entelechy Arts
