= Que Sera Sera (album) =

Studio album by Johnny Thunders
- Released: December 1985
- Recorded: March – August 1985
- Studios: Tin Pan Alley Studios, London; West 3 Studios, Acton, London
- Genres: Garage rock, punk rock, alternative rock
- Label: Jungle
- Producer: Johnny Thunders

Johnny Thunders chronology
Hurt Me (1984)	Que Sera Sera (1985)	Stations of the Cross (1987)

Professional ratings
Review scores
Source	Rating
AllMusic	3/5 stars
Kerrang!	2.5/5 stars

Que Sera Sera is the fourth studio album by Johnny Thunders, former lead guitarist of the New York Dolls and The Heartbreakers, released in December 1985. Unlike previous efforts So Alone and In Cold Blood, only one song on the album features members of his former bands, and Thunders instead relied largely on the reggae-influenced rhythm section of session musicians Keith George Yon and Tony St. Helene, nicknamed the Black Cats, and also features contributions from Dr. Feelgood guitarist Wilko Johnson, long-term collaborator Patti Palladin, and members of Hanoi Rocks.

The original 1985 release of the album had ten songs. On later pressings, other songs from the sessions were added, "Que Sera, Sera", "Cool Operator (Black Cat Remix)" and Thunders' own remix of the opening track, "Short Lives", which replaced the original mix as opener of the album. "Que Sera, Sera" was first released as a single (7" and 12"), backed with Thunders' remix of "Short Lives". "Tie Me Up" was earlier released as B-side to the Johnny Thunders and Patti Palladin single, a cover of Elvis Presley's song "Crawfish" in 1985.

== Track listing ==
All tracks composed by Johnny Thunders, except where indicated.

1. "Short Lives" (Thunders, Patti Palladin) 3:09
2. "M.I.A." 2:47
3. "I Only Wrote This Song for You" 2:32
4. "Little Bit of Whore" 2:27
5. "Cool Operator" (Thunders, Keith George Yon, Tony St. Helene) 6:18
6. "Blame It on Mom" 3:42
7. "Tie Me Up" (Thunders, Patti Palladin) 3:11
8. "Alone in a Crowd" 2:40
9. "Billy Boy" 3:00
10. "Endless Party" (Thunders, David Johansen) 2:41
11. "Que Sera, Sera" 3:41
12. "Short Lives" (original mix) 3:16
13. "Cool Operator" (Black Cat Remix) 5:49

== Personnel ==
- Johnny Thunders - guitar, vocals

Black Cats

- Keith George Yon - bass
- Tony St. Helene - drums

with:

- Wilko Johnson - guitar on 5 & 10
- Michael Monroe - saxophone, harmonica
- John Perry - guitar, keyboards, backing vocals on 1, 3, 4, 7, 8, 10, 11 & 12
- Patti Palladin - vocals
- Nasty Suicide - guitar on 1
- Stiv Bators - backing vocals on 10
- Dave Tregunna - backing vocals on 10
- Pedro Ortiz - percussion on 7
- J.C. Carroll - mandolin, accordion
- Billy Rath - bass on 7
- Jerry Nolan - drums on 7
- Henri-Paul Tortosa - guitar on 7
- John "Irish" Earle - saxophone on 7
- Judd Lander - mouth organ on 7
- St. Theresa School Choir - "child abuse" on 11

Technical

- John McGowan, Ken Thomas - engineer
- Nina Antonia - liner notes
- Leee Black Childers - photography

== Charts ==
Chart (1985)	Peak position
UK Indie Chart	6
