= Stations of the Cross (album) =

Live album by Johnny Thunders
- Released: 1987
- Recorded: 1982
- Genre: Rock and roll
- Length: 65:19
- Label: ROIR
- Producer: Lech Kowalski

Johnny Thunders chronology
Que Sera Sera (1985)	Stations of the Cross (1987)	Copy Cats (1988)

Professional ratings
Review scores
Source	Rating
The Encyclopedia of Popular Music	2/5 stars
The Rolling Stone Album Guide	3/5 stars
Spin Alternative Record Guide	6/10

Stations of the Cross is a Johnny Thunders album recorded over two sets at The Mudd Club in New York on September 30, 1982. Film director Lech Kowalski had originally planned to record a live Johnny Thunders performance for his movie, Stations of the Cross. The spoken dialogue was recorded at the Carlton Arms Hotel, New York City, in Room 29, on August 25, 1982.

== Critical reception ==
Ira Robbins, in Trouser Press, wrote that "a reasonably cogent Thunders runs through such songs as 'So Alone,' 'In Cold Blood,' 'Chinese Rocks' and 'Too Much Junkie Business,' punctuating the lively performances with typically hysterical inter-song patter."

== Track listing ==
All tracks composed by Johnny Thunders; except where indicated

1. "Pipeline" (Brian Carman, Bob Spickard)
2. "In Cold Blood"
3. "Just Another Girl" (Thunders, Sylvain Sylvain)
4. "Too Much Junkie Business"
5. "Sad Vacation"
6. "Who Needs Girls"
7. "Do You Love Me" (Berry Gordy, Jr.)
8. "So Alone"
9. "Seven Day Weekend" (Mort Shuman, Doc Pomus)
10. "Chinese Rocks" (Thunders, Richard Hell, Jerry Nolan, Dee Dee Ramone)
11. Reentry Interlude
12. "Who Do Voodoo"
13. "Surfer Jam"
14. "Just Because I'm White"
15. "One Track Mind"
16. "London Boys" (Thunders, Walter Lure, Billy Rath)
17. "(I'm Not Your) Steppin' Stone" (Tommy Boyce, Bobby Hart)
18. "Baby Talk"
19. "Creature From E.T. Rap"
20. "I'd Much Rather Be With The Boys"
21. "Pipeline" (Brian Carman, Bob Spickard)

== Personnel ==
- Johnny Thunders - guitar, vocals
- Walter Lure - guitar, vocals; lead vocals on "Too Much Junkie Business" & "Seven Day Weekend"
- Jerry Nolan - drums
- Talarico - bass, vocals
- Steve Remote - recording engineer
