= Too Much Junkie Business =

Demo by The Heartbreakers

from the album L.A.M.F.: The Lost '77 Mixes
- Released: 1994
- Recorded: December 13, 1977
- Studio: Riverside, London
- Label: Jungle
- Songwriters: Walter Lure, Johnny Thunders
- Producer: Mike Thorne

"Too Much Junkie Business" is a song written by Walter Lure of the New York punk band the Heartbreakers. Johnny Thunders sometimes introduced it as "written by Chuck Berry, Bo Diddley, and Waldo (Lure)." The lyrics are a black-humored takeoff on Chuck Berry's "Too Much Monkey Business" (1956), about the complications of everyday life. Its melody is the New York Dolls' version of "Pills" by Bo Diddley. Thunders performed it often in his post-Heartbreakers career. Lure has said that he let Thunders take co-writing credit because "he liked it so much and he wished he’d wrote it".

A Heartbreakers demo recorded for EMI appears on L.A.M.F.: The Lost '77 Mixes and live versions are included on many compilations. Walter Lure has performed it often with and without his band the Waldos. He and Billy Rath recorded a version in 1978 for Island Records which was never released. With Dee Dee Ramone's "Chinese Rocks," the song became a nostalgic anthem of sorts for punk-era and Thunders memorial concerts and tributes.
