= LAMF =

LAMF may refer to:

- L.A.M.F., the only studio album by the Heartbreakers
- Los Angeles Media Fund, an American independent entertainment company
- "Leopards ate my face", a political idiom
