= Too Much Junkie Business (compilation album) =

- Album art for The New Too Much Junkie Business reissue (1999).

Compilation album by Johnny Thunders
- Released: March 7, 1983
- Recorded: Late 1982
- Genre: Punk rock
- Length: 43:25
- Label: ROIR
- Producers: Jimmy Miller, Johnny Thunders

Johnny Thunders chronology
| So Alone (1978) | Too Much Junkie Business (1983) | In Cold Blood (1983) |

Professional ratings
Review scores
| Source | Rating |
|---|---|
| Allmusic | 2.5/5 stars |
| Q | 1/5 stars |
| Robert Christgau | (B) |

Too Much Junkie Business is a compilation of studio demos and live recordings, recorded in late 1982 by protopunk guitarist and singer Johnny Thunders. It is one of the original releases by Neil Cooper's then cassette-only label ROIR. It was reissued in 1999 on compact disc as The New Too Much Junkie Business.

The album is notable for being one of the few places to find studio versions of Thunders' live staples "In Cold Blood" and "Just Another Girl", but the album is dominated by live recordings of a typically sloppy and chaotic Thunders performance at the Peppermint Lounge in New York City. Thunders also interjects some studio-recorded interjections throughout the album, including one where he claims that the title track, another live staple, was co-written by Chuck Berry and Bo Diddley along with its actual author, longtime Thunders co-conspirator Walter Lure.

Another Thunders composition, "Who Needs Girls?", is credited wholly to Booker T. & The MG's because of its resemblance to the veteran Memphis soul act's instrumental "Green Onions".

== Track listing ==
All tracks written by Johnny Thunders, except where noted.

1. "Who Do Voodoo"
2. "In Cold Blood"
3. "Just Another Girl"
4. "Sad Vacation"
5. "Diary Of A Lover"
6. "Get Off The Phone" (Walter Lure, Jerry Nolan)
7. "Who Needs Girls?" (Booker T. Jones, Booker T. & the MG's)
8. "Too Much Junkie Business" (Walter Lure)
9. "King Of The Gypsies"
10. "So Alone"
11. "I Love You"
12. "Great Big Kiss" (Shadow Morton)
13. "Let Go" (Johnny Thunders, Jerry Nolan)
14. "Jet Boy" (Johnny Thunders, David Johansen)

== Personnel ==
- Johnny Thunders – lead guitar, vocals

=== Additional musicians ===
- Louis (no last name given) – bass (except where noted)
- Jerry Nolan – drums on Tracks 1–3
- Walter Lure – guitar, vocals (except Track 9)
- Tony Curio (a typo. Real name Tony Coiro) – bass on Tracks 11–12
- Peter Bollen – saxophone on Track 12
- Ronnie Peterson – electric piano on Track 12
- Billy Rogers – drums (on all other tracks except Track 9)
- Wayne Kramer – guitar, vocals on Track 9
- Ron Cook – bass, vocals on Track 9
- John Morgan – drums, bongos on Track 9
- The Rixons – backing vocals on Track 12
