= Judd Lander =

English harmonicist

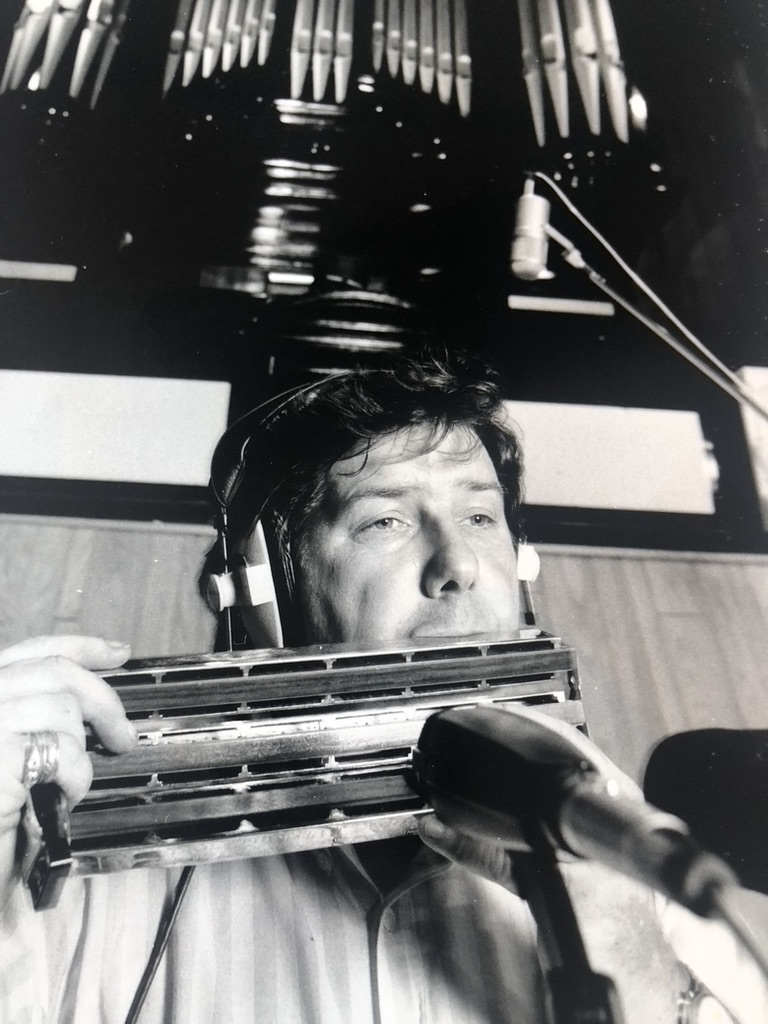
- Judd Lander, recording session at The Angel Studios, London

Background information
- Born: 1 March 1948 (age 78); Liverpool, England
- Instruments: Vocals; harmonica; bagpipes
- Years active: 1960s–present
- Formerly of: The Hideaways

Judd Lander (born 1 March 1948) is an English harmonicist. Originally from Liverpool, Lander was previously a member of the band the Hideaways. He has experienced success as a prolific session musician, record industry executive, and company director.

Lander has played on hits such as Culture Club's "Karma Chameleon" as well as "Church of the Poison Mind" and the Spice Girls' hit "Say You'll Be There". He has played with many musicians including Paul McCartney, Annie Lennox, ABC and Madness.

== Work as a musician ==
Lander was an intricate part of the late Mersey Beat scene, playing with well-known local band the Hideaways. The band were one of the first R&B groups in Liverpool and to this day hold the record for the most performances in the Cavern's history, surpassing the Beatles. In the mid-1960s Lander kindled a relationship with Sonny Boy Williamson II (Aleck Ford 'Rice' Miller) who taught him the intricacies of the Blues Harmonica. Lander's playing technique became much in demand and his enthusiasm for the music industry led him to record label Charisma Records, whilst still retaining his status as a respected session musician.

His reputation as both PR-man and session musician continued to grow and in 1975 he was approached by Apple Records to help with John Lennon's Rock 'n' Roll album. As a musician he was invited to perform on various in-house sessions with artists such as Billy Preston. Over the course of his career and directorships at various major labels, he has been instrumental in the careers of artists such ABBA, Michael Jackson, Nigel Dick and the Proclaimers. He was also responsible for breaking Meat Loaf in the UK, receiving a proclamation by the Mayor of the City Of Cleveland. Lander is also noted for persuading a rather recluse guitar icon Jeff Beck into doing a TV interview which had a bizarre result. Head-hunted by RCA records to run their Motown UK Record division, Lander joined them at the historic Motown 25th anniversary show: "Yesterday, Today, Forever".

Whilst at Motown, Lander was called to a session at Red Bus Studios in London to lay down a harmonica part with a then relatively unknown band called Culture Club which led him to create the now-famous harmonica lead on their No 1 – million seller "Karma Chameleon" and on "Church of the Poison Mind". Following the release came a glut of TV and Wembley Stadium appearances. Around this period Lander was invited to join Paul McCartney on stage at The Odeon Hammersmith for a charity concert, and has since worked with Paul on his Flowers in the Dirt.

As a musician, Lander is credited with performances on over 2000 recording sessions. He is noted for his work with artists such as The Beach Boys, Nazareth, The Proclaimers, Kirsty MacColl, Prefab Sprout, Maxi Priest, Madness, The The, Tina Turner, Mike Oldfield, The Communards, Richard Ashcroft, Annie Lennox. In addition, he has an entry in Who's Who in the Music Industry and has received one of the highest musical accolades – the Gold Award from BASCA, the British Academy of Songwriters, Composers and Authors, held at London's Savoy hotel. This coveted award celebrates the achievements of a group of people who have made an outstanding contribution to Britain's music industry. Lander was also involved in the biggest event in the UK music calendar – The BRIT AWARDS. Lander had worked on this show for the past 22 years as floor cam director.

== Work in television ==
Lander moved into the world of television as a puppeteer on BBC's Saturday Superstore children's show for a period of five years, then as an associated producer on The St Lucia Jazz Festival – shot in the Caribbean. His on-screen credits can also be seen in Resting Rough an odd but amusing short film about a flea ridden mattress, which featured Pierce Brosnan – Judd composed arranged and produced the film's music. He also contributed to quite a few BBC drama episodes and headed the position as Director of promotions with London Records. His Chrysalis Records appointment saw him deliver the No. 1 hit "The One and Only" with Chesney Hawkes. Other shows include – Top of the Pops, The Tube, The Old Grey Whistle Test and Later... with Jools Holland.

He then became A&R/ Label Director at Warner Music Group, a division of Warner Bros. In this role, Warner Music Group enjoyed No. 2 and No. 3 chart singles. In recent years, he has returned to his roots in public relations.

== Partial discography ==
- 1983: Bay City Rollers – Ricochet
- 1983: Culture Club – Colour by Numbers
- 1984: Tracey Ullman – You Caught Me Out
- 1984: Anthony Phillips – Private Parts and Pieces IV: A Catch at the Tables
- 1984: Bruce Foxton – Touch Sensitive
- 1985: Madness – Mad Not Mad
- 1985: Johnny Thunders – Que Sera Sera
- 1985: The Beach Boys – The Beach Boys
- 1986: Robbie Nevil – Robbie Nevil
- 1986: The The – Infected
- 1987: The Communards – Red
- 1987: ABC – Alphabet City
- 1988: Johnny Thunders and Patti Palladin – Copy Cats
- 1989: Paul McCartney – Flowers in the Dirt
- 1990: Prefab Sprout – Jordan: The Comeback
- 1991: Kirsty MacColl – Electric Landlady
- 1993: Helen Hoffner – Wild about Nothing
- 1995: Annie Lennox – Medusa
- 1996: Dina Carroll – Only Human
- 1996: Spice Girls – Spice
- 2000: Richard Ashcroft – Alone with Everybody
