= Copy Cats (album) =

Studio album by Johnny Thunders and Patti Palladin
- Released: 1988
- Recorded: May–December 1987; track 6, 1984
- Studios: Falconer and Olympic, London
- Label: Jungle
- Producer: Patti Palladin

Johnny Thunders chronology
Stations of the Cross (1985)	Copy Cats (1988)

Copy Cats is an album by the American musician Johnny Thunders and the only album by Patti Palladin. The album contains cover versions of rock 'n' roll classics that were originally recorded from 1954 to 1969. Thunders was inspired by John Lennon's 1975 album Rock 'n' Roll, which similarly had new versions of older hits.

The album title originated was from being a set of cover versions or copies of other songs, and also and from a song by Gary U.S. Bonds, "Copycat", which was recorded for the album but not released.

== Critical reception ==
Professional ratings
Review scores
Source	Rating
AllMusic	4/5 stars
Chicago Tribune	2.5/4 stars

The Chicago Tribune wrote that the album "could have been tossed off as a lark, but the music—which ranges from swamp-rock to girl-group stylings to a mambo/R&B hybrid—emerges crisp, polished and generally enjoyable." The Los Angeles Times stated that it "features punchy cover versions of mostly obscure R&B oldies, with Thunders using his thin, nasal voice to humorous effect with theatrical mannerisms."

== Track listing ==
The tracks were called "scenes"

=== Side one – "Act one" ===
1. "Can't Seem to Make You Mine" (Sky Saxon) original version by the Seeds, 1965
2. "Baby It's You" (Mack David, Barney Williams, Burt Bacharach) original version by the Shirelles, 1961
3. "She Wants to Mambo" (Maxwell Davis, Gene Ford) original version by the Chanters, 1954
4. "Treat Her Right" (Roy Head) original version by Roy Head and the Traits, 1965
5. "Uptown to Harlem" (Betty Mabry) original version by the Chambers Brothers, 1967
6. "Crawfish" (Fred Wise, Ben Weisman) original version by Kitty White and Elvis Presley from the film King Creole, 1958

=== Side two – "Act two" ===
1. "Alligator Wine" (Jerry Leiber, Mike Stoller) original version by Screamin' Jay Hawkins, 1958
2. "Two Time Loser" (Alden Bunn, Anna Sandford) original version by Tarheel Slim and Little Ann, 1963
3. "Love Is Strange" (Ethel Cookie Smith, Mac Houston Baker) original version by Mickey & Sylvia, 1956
4. "I Was Born to Cry" (Dion DiMucci) original version by Dion, 1962
5. "He Cried" (Greg Richards, Ted Daryll) original version as "She Cried" by Jay and the Americans, 1962
6. "Let Me Entertain You (Parts 1 and 2)" (Jule Styne, Stephen Sondheim) original version from the musical Gypsy, 1959

== Personnel ==
- Johnny Thunders – guitar, vocals
- Patti Palladin – vocals
- John Perry – guitar, synth strings
- Robbie A. Gordon – guitar
- Jimi Haynes – guitar
- Henri Padovani – guitar
- Billy Rath – bass
- Jerry Nolan – drums
- Steve Washington – drums
- Chris Taylor – bass, drums
- Barry Andrews – organ, piano
- Pedro Ortiz – tambourines, maracas, percussion
- Jim Dvorak – trumpet
- Nick Evans – tambourine
- John "Irish" Earle – saxophones
- Alex Bǎlǎnescu – violins
- Maribel La Manchega – castanets
- Chrissie Hynde – backing vocals
- Jayne County – backing vocals
- Blair Booth – backing vocals
- Simon Humphries – backing vocals
- Paul Long – backing vocals
- Judd Lander – harmonica
- Anthony Thistlethwaite – harmonica

Technical

- Keith Hancock, Ken Thomas (on scene 6) – engineer
- Leee Black Childers – cover photography
