= Live at Max's Kansas City (Johnny Thunders album) =

Live album by the Heartbreakers
- Released: 1979 (original LP)
- Recorded: 1978 (original LP); 1979 (CD bonus tracks)
- Genre: Punk rock
- Length: 34:44 (LP); 57:57 (CD)
- Labels: Max's Kansas City (LP); Beggars Banquet (LP); ROIR (CD)
- Producers: Peter Crowley; The Heartbreakers

The Heartbreakers chronology
L.A.M.F. (1977)	Live at Max's Kansas City (1979)	D.T.K. - Live At The Speakeasy (1982)

Professional ratings
Review scores
Source	Rating
AllMusic	link
Christgau's Record Guide	A−

Live at Max's Kansas City is a live album by the Heartbreakers. Recorded at a "reunion"/"farewell" show on September 16, 1978, at Max's Kansas City nightclub, the album's performance — loud, sloppy, and laden with bawdy introductions and/or lyric changes to many of the familiar songs from their only studio album, L.A.M.F. — further cemented the band's live reputation. A classic of early punk rock, the album has been called "probably the best official document of any New York band of the era."

== History ==
The Heartbreakers had broken up in late 1977, after the failure of the L.A.M.F. album. Co-lead singer/co-lead guitarist Johnny Thunders remained in England and recorded his first solo album, So Alone, during the summer of 1978. His fellow ex-Heartbreakers Walter Lure and Billy Rath had participated in some of the sessions for the album, and after finishing the album, all three decided to play some gigs in New York "for old time's sake" and some "chump change." With drummer Jerry Nolan reluctant to backtrack his steps after quitting the band over L.A.M.F.'s poor sound, the Thunders/Lure/Rath triumvirate recruited other local drummers to fill in. The band's first reunion gigs, billed as farewell shows, were at Max's on August 18 and 19 with drummer Lee Crystal. These shows went poorly - the Village Voice described them as a "depressing debacle" and said that Thunders had "given up the ghost." Nevertheless, the band returned to Max's on September 15 (Friday) and September 16th (Saturday) with Ty Styx on drums, playing sets that included most of L.A.M.F. along with a few songs from So Alone and occasional covers. Both sets on the 16th were recorded; fortunately, the performances were up to the band's usual standard. Ty Styx continued playing drums for the band for occasional shows throughout October until being replaced by Tony Machine in November 1978.

The band had continued to play occasional shows in New York with post New York Dolls a.k.a. The Dolls percussionist Tony Machine on drums throughout November 1978 until February 1979, and Jerry Nolan eventually returned to the drum throne in March 1979. Released on Max's Kansas City Records and in England on Beggars Banquet Records through a logo deal with Max's Kansas City, the album was an immediate success upon its release in July 1979. As Robert Christgau put it, "This captures the boys in all their rowdy, rabble-rousing abandon, and I know that when I feel like hearing them I'll be pulling it off the shelf."

The success of the album was enough to warrant a second live recording done at the same venue. By that time, however, the band were all struggling with their various addictions, with Thunders' own heroin habit escalating. The first two nights of the three-night stand resulted in very little if any usable material, but by the last night, the band were in rare form, with Thunders and Lure delivering their usual witty introductions between songs. After playing five songs, Thunders suddenly left the stage, claiming he had to "tune up" — never to return that evening. Ironically, two songs earlier, the band had played their semi-autobiographical "Too Much Junkie Business".

Several years later, the five songs from the second recordings were remixed, along with the original album, in preparation for a long-awaited reissue of the original Live at Max's album with the "new" recordings appended to it. Walter Lure and Billy Rath participated in the mixing. Thunders was unable to participate due to other commitments, but was played the results, and gave them his full endorsement, requesting only that the 1979 recordings were released "just the way it is, including the talk." The reissue would not be released until 1995, a few years after Thunders' death. Both the original album and the later recordings were rereleased in 2015 on vinyl as "Live at Max's Volumes 1 and 2."

== Track listing ==
=== Side one ===
1. (Intro)
  - This recording of air raid sirens, battlefield sounds, and military chants was the band's usual intro music.
2. "Milk Me" (Johnny Thunders)
  - The song was originally entitled "Chatterbox" on the New York Dolls' second album Too Much Too Soon and "Leave Me Alone"on So Alone
3. "Chinese Rocks" (Dee Dee Ramone, Richard Hell)
4. "Get Off the Phone" (Walter Lure, Jerry Nolan)
5. "London Boys" (Thunders, Lure, Billy Rath)
  - Thunders dedicates the song to "Joe Bummer" - Joe Strummer of the Clash. Members of the Clash, including Strummer and Mick Jones, were in New York at the time mixing their second album Give 'Em Enough Rope, and Jones played guitar in Sid Vicious' backing band for a gig at Max's later that month. It's not known if Strummer was actually in the audience that night.
6. "Take a Chance" (Lure, Nolan)
  - Thunders says before the song, "Yeah, we love the Yankees. They won today again." The Yankees defeated the Boston Red Sox that day to increase their lead in the American League East to 3.5 games, and would go on to win the 1978 World Series.
7. "One Track Mind" (Lure, Nolan)

=== Side two ===
1. "All By Myself" (Lure, Nolan)
  - This song was deleted from the 1995 CD reissue and replaced with the version from the later shows with Jerry Nolan on drums. It was restored on the 2015 vinyl reissue. On the original version, Styx makes a mistake and the band has to restart the song, prompting Thunders to quip "We're not the most professional band in the world."
2. "Let Go" (Thunders, Nolan)
3. "I Love You" (Thunders)
4. "Can't Keep My Eyes on You" (Lure, Nolan, Hell)
5. "I Wanna Be Loved" (Thunders)
6. "Do You Love Me" (Berry Gordy Jr.)

=== CD reissue ("Volume 2") bonus tracks ===
1. "All By Myself" (Lure, Nolan)
2. "Pirate Love" (Thunders)
3. "Too Much Junkie Business" (Lure, Thunders)
  - Lure acknowledged in the liner notes of the 2002 reissue of L.A.M.F. that he actually wrote the song himself but gave Thunders co-writing credit since it was basically his life story. Thunders would often introduce the song onstage by saying that Lure had written it with Chuck Berry and Bo Diddley. The song title parodies Berry's "Too Much Monkey Business" and the music pays homage to Diddley's "Pills" (which was covered by the New York Dolls).
4. "Don't Mess with Cupid" (Deanie Parker, Eddie Floyd, Steve Cropper)
5. "So Alone" (Thunders)

=== Full set list ===
Bootleg recordings of the September 16 shows exist. The full sets performed that night were:

Early set (* indicates songs released on the live album):

1. Intro*
2. "Milk Me"
3. "Chinese Rocks"*
4. "Get Off The Phone"*
5. "London"*
6. "Too Much Junkie Business"
7. "All By Myself"*
8. "Let Go"*
9. "You Can't Put Your Arms Around a Memory"
10. "Seven Day Weekend" (Gary U.S. Bonds cover)
11. "Who Are the Mystery Girls" (New York Dolls cover)
12. "I Love You"*
13. "Can't Keep My Eyes On You"*
14. "Born To Lose"
15. "One Track Mind"*
16. "I Wanna Be Loved"*
17. "Pipeline" (The Chantays cover)
18. "Do You Love Me"* (The Contours cover)

Late Set:

1. "Pipeline"
2. "Milk Me"*
3. "Chinese Rocks"
4. "London Boys"
5. "Get Off The Phone"
6. "Too Much Junkie Business"
7. "All By Myself"
8. "Let Go"
9. "Seven Day Weekend"
10. "Born To Lose"
11. "Take a Chance"*
12. "Do You Love Me"
13. "Daddy Rolling Stone" (Otis Blackwell cover)
14. "One Track Mind"
15. "I Wanna Be Loved"

== Personnel ==
- Johnny Thunders - guitar, vocals
- Walter Lure - guitar, vocals
- Billy Rath - bass
- Ty Styx - drums
  - Styx's stint in the band was brief. The band played at Max's on August 18 and 19 with Lee Crystal on drums. Styx joined the band for the two gigs in September that resulted in the live album, and for a short tour that included gigs in Los Angeles and San Francisco. He was replaced by Tony Machine by the time the band next played at Max's on November 17. Machine continued to play with the band until Jerry Nolan returned in March 1979.
- Jerry Nolan - drums (Bonus Tracks)
