= Just Another Girl =

Just Another Girl may refer to:

== Songs ==
- "Just Another Girl" (Monica song)
- "Just Another Girl" (The Killers song)
- "Just Another Girl" by Johnny Thunders, from the album In Cold Blood
- "Just Another Girl" by Shaggy (feat. Tarrus Riley), from the album Summer in Kingston
- "Just Another Girl" by Kim Jaejoong, from the album WWW
- "Just Another Girl" by Ken Boothe
