= Wixen Music Publishing =

American music publishing company

Wixen Music Publishing, Inc., formerly known as Backlash Enterprises, Inc., is an independent American music publishing company founded in 1979 by Randall Wixen. The company is headquartered in Calabasas, California. The company provides music publishing administration, copyright management, and royalty compliance services.

== History ==
Wixen Music Publishing, Inc. was formed in 1979 as Backlash Enterprises by Randall Wixen. The company was renamed Backlash Enterprises, Inc., in 1984, and Wixen Music Publishing, Inc., in 1990.

== Services ==
Wixen Music Publishing, Inc. offers a range of services to songwriters and music publishers, including music publishing administration, licensing, and royalty management.

Wixen Music Publishing, Inc. has represented over 4000 songwriters, composers, bands, and recording artists from all genres, including renowned names such as Tom Petty, Barry Mann and Cynthia Weil, the Black Keys, Journey, the Heartbreakers, Missy Elliott, Sturgill Simpson, The Beach Boys, Rage Against the Machine, Sonny Bono, Al Green, Styx, George Harrison, and Carlos Santana.

== Litigations ==
In December 2017, Wixen Music Publishing filed a $1.6 billion copyright infringement lawsuit against Spotify, alleging that the streaming service used over 2,000 songs from its catalog without mechanical licenses. In December 2018, Wixen Music Publishing, Inc. amicably resolved and dismissed the suit.
