= Hurt Me (album) =

Studio album by Johnny Thunders
- Released: 1984
- Recorded: October–November 1983
- Studios: Studios WW, Paris, France
- Genre: Acoustic rock
- Label: New Rose
- Producers: Johnny Thunders, Christopher Giercke

Johnny Thunders chronology
| In Cold Blood (1983) | Hurt Me (1984) | Que Sera Sera (1985) |

Hurt Me is an album by the American musician Johnny Thunders, released in 1984. It was recorded in Paris, with just an acoustic guitar. Richard Hell wrote the lyrics to the title track.

== Critical reception ==
Professional ratings
Review scores
| Source | Rating |
|---|---|
| AllMusic | 4/5 stars |
| The Encyclopedia of Popular Music | 3/5 stars |
| Spin Alternative Record Guide | 7/10 |
| Uncut | 2/5 stars |

The Omaha World-Herald wrote: "Instead of rocking out, he sounds haunting and barely hopeful. Perhaps he intended to make such an intensely personal album. Or maybe he just didn't want to pay a band."

== Track listing ==
All tracks composed by Johnny Thunders, except where indicated

Side A

1. "Sad Vacation"
2. "Eve of Destruction" (P.F. Sloan)
3. "Too Much Too Soon" (Thunders, Sylvain Sylvain)
4. "Joey Joey" (Bob Dylan)
5. "I'm a Boy I'm a Girl"
6. "Go Back to Go" (Thunders, Sylvain Sylvain)
7. "I Like to Play Games"
8. "Hurt Me" (Thunders, Richard Hell)
9. "Illegitimate Son of Segovia"
10. "It Ain't Me Babe" (Bob Dylan)

Side B

1. "Diary of a Lover"
2. "I'd Rather Be with the Boys (Than Girls Like You)" (Keith Richards, Andrew Loog Oldham)
3. "You Can't Put Your Arms Around a Memory"
4. "She's So Untouchable"
5. "Ask Me No Questions"
6. "She's So Strange"
7. "Lonely Planet Boy" (David Johansen)
8. "M.I.A."
9. "Cosa Nostra"

== Personnel ==
- Johnny Thunders - guitar, vocals
- Charlotte - backing vocals on "I'd Rather Be with the Boys"

Technical

- Patrick Woindrich - engineer
- Kathy Findlay - cover photography
