= John Spacely =

American musician, actor, and activist

John Spacely / Gringo
- Born: Venice Beach, California, U.S.
- Died: 1993; New York City, New York
- Occupations: actor, musician, activist

John Spacely (real name John Olgin), also known as Gringo, was an American musician, actor, and nightlife personality. His life was chronicled in two Lech Kowalski documentaries, Story of a Junkie and Born To Lose: The Last Rock and Roll Movie.

== Personal life ==
He was born in Venice, Los Angeles, and his birth name is unknown, (likely John Olgin). He adopted the stage name of John Spacely at a young age. His mother, Delphine Carmen Luke Olgin put him up for adoption along with his two sisters, Joni and Sharon. Delphine Olgin likely had at least two more children, a girl named Holiday and a boy whose name is not known at this time. His father abandoned his family, which made him not want to use his father's last name. While in California, he was nicknamed Whiskey John. Living in Venice, California John helped his mother to deal drugs, particularly marijuana. He was busted for dealing marijuana and expelled from Venice High School. He later was known in New York City as Gringo. His grandfather was of Hispanic descent, and he had one brother and one sister. He attended Venice High School.

Spacely began hustling on the Venice Beach boardwalk after high school. He then moved on to hustling in the San Francisco area, and on the Sunset Strip in Los Angeles. Various reports have stated he had multiple long-term girlfriends/wives. In 1980, Spacely's wife, Cindy Elaine Houldson, became pregnant with Spacely's son, but the pregnancy ended in a miscarriage. Shortly thereafter, Houldson died in a motorcycle accident in Washington state. These events greatly affected Spacely and led to his growing substance abuse.

In the 1970s, he moved to New York City for better career opportunities. He first lived in Alphabet City, near the East Village where, he used to sell heroin to (and among many many others) actor John Belushi. Alphabet City during this time was largely populated by Hispanic immigrants and African-Americans, which made Spacely stand out in the street. Spacely got a job working for Punk Magazine as a contributor and publisher, which lasted until his drug addiction got to the point where he was unable to work. He then returned to his life of hustling, focusing on the St. Mark's area of the East Village, where he became a popular street personality. Around this time, he got in an altercation with a drag queen, who along with some others attacked Spacely with chains, injuring his eye. After this incident, Spacely most often wore an eye patch over his damaged eye, because he did not have enough money to have the surgery needed to correct the eye. He also began bleaching his hair light blond, which gave him his trademark look. He would often run out of hair salons without paying with the bleach still in his hair, because he didn't have money for the bill.

Spacely began befriending many of the musicians and artists that lived in the East Village during that time, including Keith Richards, Willy Deville, Joey Ramone, Harley Flanagan of the Cro-Mags, Cheetah Chrome of the Dead Boys, Jerry Only of the Misfits and members of the New York Dolls, especially Johnny Thunders, who was his close friend (despite the two getting in an on-stage physical altercation in 1982, as seen in the documentary Born To Lose: The Last Rock and Roll Movie). Spacely would sometimes perform on stage in different capacities. His main focus however was acting.

== Gringo ==
In 1982 producers approached him to play the lead in the film Gringo: Story of a Junkie. In the film he appears as a fictionalized version of himself. Story of a Junkie depicts the widespread drug problem in New York City during that time, featuring graphic scenes of Spacely shooting up heroin. The film played in several festivals, and to promote the film the director Lech Kowalski hired local artist Art Guerra to paint a mural of Spacely on the side of a building on St. Mark's Place in the East Village, where he was the self described "mayor of the street". The mural of him caused controversy, as some stated it glorified Spacely's dangerous lifestyle. The mural became a popular tourist point until 2000, when the building's owner decided to paint over the mural. Photos of the mural can still be found online.

== Later life ==
Spacely cleaned up his act after appearing in Gringo, and tried to pursue a serious acting career. He had a brief appearance in the first few minutes of the film Sid and Nancy, wearing his signature eyepatch, as a punk hitting a reporter up for money as Sid is dragged out of the Chelsea Hotel by police. Spacely was a personal friend of Sid Vicious. He was an early supporter of Ibogaine as a treatment for drug addiction.

Spacely contracted HIV, and died in 1993 from AIDS. As he was dying from AIDS, he was filmed for the documentary Born To Lose: The Last Rock and Roll Movie. Since his death, his story has become folklore in the places he used to hustle, his story appearing in many books about New York City street culture. Spacely is still remembered today for his vibrant personality and street antics.

== Filmography ==
Year	Title	Role	Notes
1985	After Hours	Club Berlin patron with eyepatch	Uncredited
1985	Story of a Junkie	Himself	
1986	Sid and Nancy	Chelsea Resident	(final film role)
