= Ballad of a Thin Line Man =

Studio album by Giant Sand
- Released: 1986
- Studio: Baby'O Recorders, Granny's House, West 3 Studios
- Genre: Indie rock, alternative rock
- Label: Zippo
- Producer: Giant Sand, Eric Westfall

Giant Sand chronology
Valley of Rain (1985)	Ballad of a Thin Line Man (1986)	Storm (1988)

Professional ratings
Review scores
Source	Rating
AllMusic	3.5/5 stars
The Encyclopedia of Popular Music	3/5 stars
Select	4/5 medals
Spin Alternative Record Guide	7/10

Ballad of a Thin Line Man is the second album by American band Giant Sand. It was released in 1986 by record label Zippo.

== Reception ==
AllMusic opined that the album "documents a band that hadn't yet reached greatness, but was well on its way to something special." Trouser Press wrote that "Gelb shines on the ringing, Neil Young-inspired rockers."

== Track listing ==
- All songs written by Howe Gelb, except where noted.
1. "Thin Line Man"
2. "All Along the Watchtower" (Bob Dylan)
3. "Graveyard"
4. "Body of Water" (Gelb, William Sedelmayer, David Seeger, Scott Garber)
5. "Last Legs" (Gelb, James Moreland)
6. "You Can't Put Your Arms Around a Memory" (Johnny Thunders)
7. "A Hard Man to Get to Know"
8. "Who Am I?"
9. "The Chill Outside"
10. "Desperate Man"
