= No Fun Mondays =

Compilation album by Billie Joe Armstrong
- Released: November 27, 2020
- Recorded: March–September 2020
- Studio: Jingletown Studios, Oakland, California
- Genre: Punk rock; rock
- Length: 40:21
- Label: Reprise
- Producer: Billie Joe Armstrong

Billie Joe Armstrong chronology
Foreverly (2013)	No Fun Mondays (2020)

Singles from No Fun Mondays
- 1. "I Think We're Alone Now" Released: April 17, 2020; 2. "Manic Monday" Released: May 29, 2020; 3. "That Thing You Do!" Released: August 28, 2020; 4. "Whole Wide World" Released: September 4, 2020; 5. "Kids in America" Released: September 18, 2020; 6. "You Can't Put Your Arms Around a Memory" Released: September 25, 2020; 7. "Corpus Christi" Released: October 2, 2020; 8. "War Stories" Released: October 9, 2020; 9. "Amico" Released: October 16, 2020; 10. "Not That Way Anymore" Released: October 23, 2020; 11. "That's Rock 'n' Roll" Released: October 30, 2020; 12. "Gimme Some Truth" Released: November 6, 2020; 13. "A New England" Released: November 13, 2020

No Fun Mondays is a compilation album of cover songs by Green Day frontman Billie Joe Armstrong, released on November 27, 2020. The project consists of 14 cover songs released during quarantine for the COVID-19 pandemic as part of the "No Fun Mondays" series of songs in which Armstrong would release a cover song onto the Green Day YouTube channel every so often, usually on a Monday as the title suggests.

== Recording and release ==
On March 23, 2020, Billie Joe Armstrong released the first song of the series, "I Think We're Alone Now", on the Green Day YouTube channel, announcing the series at the same time. The description of the video reads "Dear friends.. While we've all been in quarantine I've been reflecting on the things that matter the most in my life. Family, friends and of course music. I recorded a cover of Tommy James and the Shondells "I think we're alone now" in my bedroom. I figure if we have to spend this time in isolation at least we can be alone together. Love BJ." The following week, a cover of "You Can't Put Your Arms Around a Memory" was released and, a week after that, a cover of "Manic Monday" featuring a video appearance from Susanna Hoffs. On October 6, it was announced the series would be released as a 14-track album.

== Critical reception ==
Professional ratings
Aggregate scores
Source	Rating
Metacritic	68/100
Review scores
Source	Rating
AllMusic	3.5/5 stars
Clash	6/10
NME	3/5 stars
Punknews.org	3.5/5 stars
Rolling Stone	3.5/5 stars

According to the review aggregator Metacritic, No Fun Mondays received "generally favorable reviews" based on a weighted average score of 68 out of 100 from 7 critic scores. Stephen Thomas Erlewine of AllMusic calls the album "a bit of a lark, unexpected in its energy but not its contents". Clash editor Robin Murray calls it "a real blast", and Julie River of Punknews.org calls it "a pop-rocking good time". At NME, editor Andrew Trendell says "Armstrong paints a pretty spot-on portrait of what it’s like to be alive in 2020, told through the hidden gems of his record collection and delivered with the heart and energy that you’ve always known him for." Rolling Stone calls the album "a batch of fun covers".

== Track listing ==
No.	Title	Writer(s)	Original artist	Length
1.	"I Think We're Alone Now"	Ritchie Cordell	Tommy James and the Shondells	2:15
2.	"War Stories"	Liam L'Estrange; John Martin; Terence Sharpe	The Starjets	2:42
3.	"Manic Monday"	Prince	The Bangles/Prince	3:07
4.	"Corpus Christi"	Penelope Houston; Bradley Grant Kent; Daniel J. O'Brien; James Calvin Wilsey	Avengers	3:24
5.	"That Thing You Do!"	Adam Schlesinger	The Wonders	2:49
6.	"Amico"	Don Backy; Giulio "Mogol" Rapetti; Burt Bacharach; Bob Hilliard	Don Backy	2:28
7.	"You Can't Put Your Arms Around a Memory"	Johnny Thunders	Johnny Thunders	3:31
8.	"Kids in America"	Marty Wilde; Ricky Wilde	Kim Wilde	3:09
9.	"Not That Way Anymore"	Stephen Bator; Frank Secich	Stiv Bators	2:53
10.	"That's Rock 'n' Roll"	Eric Carmen	Eric Carmen	2:59
11.	"Gimme Some Truth"	John Lennon	John Lennon	2:48
12.	"Whole Wide World"	Eric Goulden	Wreckless Eric	3:19
13.	"Police on My Back"	Edmond Grant	The Equals	3:11
14.	"A New England"	Billy Bragg	Billy Bragg	2:09
Total length:				40:21

== Personnel ==
Credits adapted from the liner notes of No Fun Mondays.

Musicians

- Billie Joe Armstrong – vocals, guitar, bass guitar, and drums
- Chris Dugan – drums (tracks 4, 8, 9, and 11)
- Bill Schneider – bass guitar (track 8)
- Jason White – guitar (track 8)

Technical personnel

- Billie Joe Armstrong – production, engineering (including track 11), mixing (track 14), front cover photo
- Chris Dugan – mastering, mixing, engineering (tracks 4, 8, 9, 11)
- Chris Bilheimer – design
- Greg Schneider – design
- Stephen Walker – design

== Charts ==
Weekly chart performance for No Fun Mondays
Chart (2020)	Peak position
Hungarian Albums (MAHASZ)	20
Scottish Albums (Official Charts)	71
UK Album Sales (OCC)	62
UK Album Downloads (Official Charts)	41
UK Physical Albums (OCC)	66
US Top Album Sales (Billboard)	36
US Top Alternative Albums (Billboard)	17
US Top Rock Albums (Billboard)	32
