= Crucial =

Crucial may refer to:

== Brands ==
- Crucial (brand), a discontinued consumer products brand used by semiconductor manufacturer Micron Technology

== Music ==
- Crucial, album by Ali (British singer) (1998)
- The Crucial Conspiracy, an album by The Dingees (2001)
- The Crucial Squeegie Lip, a demo recording by Ween (1987)
- Crucial, the backing band for Judy Nylon on the album Pal Judy (1982)
- Crucial Three, a short-lived band of approximately six weeks duration in early 1977
- "Crucial" (song), by New Edition (1989)
- Crucial, a song by Prince on his box set Crystal Ball (1998)
- Crucial Star, a South Korean hip-hop artist active 2007–present
