= You Can't Put Your Arms Around a Memory =

Single by Johnny Thunders

from the album So Alone
- B-side: "Hurtin'"
- Released: September 22, 1978
- Recorded: 1978
- Studio: Basing Street, London
- Genre: Punk rock
- Length: 3:48
- Label: Real ARE3
- Songwriter: Johnny Thunders

Johnny Thunders singles chronology
| "You Can't Put Your Arms Around a Memory" (1978) | "Dead or Alive" (1978) |

"You Can't Put Your Arms Around a Memory" is a song released in 1978 by Johnny Thunders, appearing on his debut solo album So Alone and as a single taken from the album. Both the song and album include the guitar work of Peter Perrett of the Only Ones. The title was taken from a line in the "Better Living Through TV" episode of the sitcom The Honeymooners (1955–1956). It is considered by many to be his signature song.

The ballad has been interpreted to be about Thunders' heroin addiction, or about his romance with Sable Starr. However, according to Nina Antonia's biography Johnny Thunders...In Cold Blood, the song was written years before he was a member of the New York Dolls and before he ever tried heroin.

== Covers ==
- Giant Sand released an up-tempo version of the song on their 1986 album Ballad of a Thin Line Man.
- Guns N' Roses covered the song on their 1993 album "The Spaghetti Incident?". All the instruments on this version were performed by Duff McKagan.
- Ronnie Spector covered the song on her 1999 EP She Talks to Rainbows and her 2006 album The Last of the Rock Stars (featuring Joey Ramone).
- In 2019, Hollywood Vampires released a version of the song on their album Rise.
- Billie Joe Armstrong of Green Day covered the song on his 2020 album No Fun Mondays.

== Use in other media ==
- The song appears in the 2005 documentary New York Doll, about Thunders's New York Dolls bandmate Arthur Kane.
- A cover of the song played by show music director Michael Ruffino and Ariane Bourdain was used in 2018 as the music for the closing montage of the final episode of Anthony Bourdain: Parts Unknown following host Anthony Bourdain's death.
