= Johnny Thunders...In Cold Blood =

1987 biography by Nina Antonia

Johnny Thunders: In Cold Blood
- Author: Nina Antonia
- Language: English
- Genre: Biography
- Publisher: Cherry Red Books
- Publication date: 1987
- Publication place: United Kingdom
- Media type: Print (Softcover)
- Pages: 234 pp
- ISBN: 1-901447-15-4
- OCLC: 53389358

Johnny Thunders: In Cold Blood is the authorised biography of American singer and guitarist Johnny Thunders, by Nina Antonia. It was originally published in 1987 by Jungle Records on their Jungle Books imprint in a 'coffee-table' illustrated A4 format, and reissued in 2000 by Cherry Red Books in a paperback format. It was also published in a Japanese edition in 1988 by Shinko Music Pub Co Ltd and an Italian translation in Italy in 2015 by Pipeline Edizioni – Ferentino.

== Background ==
In 2016 it was announced that a movie based on the book was planned to be directed by Jonas Akerlund.

In 2019 it was announced that an illustrated eBook edition would be released on Thunders' birthday, July 15, alongside 'Johnny Thunders Sleeve Notes', an interactive collection of Nina Antonia's writings originally published in CD & LP album releases.

Nina Antonia also wrote a biography of Thunders' original band, the New York Dolls, published by Omnibus Press and other music-related books including on Peter Perrett and Pete Doherty.
