= So Alone (album) =

Studio album by Johnny Thunders
- Released: October 6, 1978
- Recorded: January–June 1978
- Studio: Basing Street
- Genres: Punk rock; rock and roll
- Length: 32:16
- Labels: Real (UK); Sire (US)
- Producers: Johnny Thunders; Steve Lillywhite with special thanks to Steve Jones and Peter Perrett; Joe McEwen, Ira Robbins (reissue)

Johnny Thunders chronology
So Alone (1978)	Too Much Junkie Business (1983)

Singles from So Alone
- 1. "You Can't Put Your Arms Around a Memory" Released: September 22, 1978

So Alone is the debut solo studio album by Johnny Thunders, then leader of the Heartbreakers and formerly lead guitarist for New York Dolls. The album was released on October 6, 1978, and was produced by Thunders and Steve Lillywhite. So Alone was preceded by the singles "Dead or Alive" and "You Can't Put Your Arms Round A Memory", the former originally being omitted from the album and later included as a bonus track on the 1992 reissue. The album featured Heartbreakers-members Walter Lure and Billy Rath, as well as several guest musicians, including Phil Lynott, Steve Marriott, Paul Gray, Peter Perrett, Steve Jones, Paul Cook, Mike Kellie, Patti Palladin, and Chrissie Hynde.

== Background and overview ==
After recording L.A.M.F. with the Heartbreakers, Thunders returned to the studio and recorded his first solo album, So Alone, from January to June 1978. The album contained a mix of original songs, tracks regularly performed live by the Heartbreakers, and covers, including the Chantays' surf classic "Pipeline," the Shangri-Las' "Give Him a Great Big Kiss", Otis Blackwell's "Daddy Rollin' Stone", and New York Dolls' "Subway Train".

The song "You Can't Put Your Arms Around a Memory" is considered by many to be Thunders' signature song, and has later been covered by Guns N' Roses, Billie Joe Armstrong of Green Day, Ronnie Spector with Joey Ramone, and Nick Oliveri with both Queens of the Stone Age and Mondo Generator.

The track "London Boys" was written as an answer song/diss track from Thunders aimed at the Sex Pistols who had recorded a song called "New York" on their album Never Mind the Bollocks, Here's the Sex Pistols a year earlier, in which they anachronistically attacked Thunders's band New York Dolls for being rip-offs. Former Sex Pistols-members Steve Jones and Paul Cook play guitar and drums on the track respectively.

== Reception ==
Professional ratings
Review scores
Source	Rating
AllMusic	4.5/5 stars
Alternative Rock	10/10
Classic Rock	4.5/5 stars
Mojo	4/5 stars
Q	3/5 stars
The Rolling Stone Album Guide	4/5 stars
Select	5/5
Spin Alternative Record Guide	8/10
Uncut	4/5 stars

So Alone was released in October 1978 to good reviews from critics. Trouser Press noted that the album was "Thunders at his best", while Classic Rock called it "spectacular" and the pinnacle of Thunders' solo career. Music critic Robert Christgau named the album one the few import-only records from the 1970s that he loved but omitted from Christgau's Record Guide: Rock Albums of the Seventies.

== Track listing ==
All tracks are written by Johnny Thunders, except where noted.

Side one
No.	Title	Writer(s)	Length
1.	"Pipeline"	Bob Spickard, Brian Carman	2:21
2.	"You Can't Put Your Arms Around a Memory"		3:45
3.	"Great Big Kiss"	George "Shadow" Morton	3:22
4.	"Ask Me No Questions"		3:33
5.	"Leave Me Alone"		2:47

Side two
No.	Title	Writer(s)	Length
6.	"Daddy Rollin' Stone"	Otis Blackwell	3:20
7.	"London Boys"	Thunders, Walter Lure, Billy Rath	2:50
8.	"(She's So) Untouchable"		2:54
9.	"Subway Train"	Thunders, David Johansen	4:11
10.	"Downtown"	Thunders, Johansen	3:13
Total length:			32:16

1992 reissue bonus tracks
No.	Title	Writer(s)	Length
11.	"Dead or Alive"		3:13
12.	"Hurtin'"	Henri Paul Tortosa, Thunders	3:06
13.	"So Alone" (Outtake)		4:54
14.	"The Wizard" (Outtake)	Marc Bolan	3:22
Total length:			46:51

== Personnel ==
- Johnny Thunders – guitar (all tracks), vocals (track 2–10), producer
- Koulla Kakoulli – vocals (track 9)
- Patti Palladin – vocals (track 3, 9)
- Chrissie Hynde – vocals (track 9)
- Peter Perrett – guitar (track 2, 4, 8, 9), vocals (track 2, 4, 9)
- Steve Jones – guitar (track 1, 3, 5–7)
- Walter Lure – guitar (track 3)
- Henri Paul Tortosa – guitar (track 9)
- Phil Lynott – bass (track 1, 5–7, 12), vocals (track 6)
- Paul Gray – bass (track 2, 4, 8–11)
- Billy Rath – bass (track 3)
- Paul Cook – drums (track 1, 3, 5–7)
- Mike Kellie – drums (track 2, 4, 8, 9, 12)
- Steve Nicol – drums (track 10)
- John "Irish" Earle – saxophone (track 3, 8, 9)
- Steve Lillywhite – piano (track 3), producer, engineer
- Steve Marriott – harmonica, keyboards, piano, vocals (track 6)

Technical

- Ira Robbins – producer (reissue), liner notes
- Joe McEwan – producer (reissue)
- Lee Herschberg – remastering
- Mike Beal – artwork
- Peter Gravelle – photography
- Molly Reeve-Morrison – project coordinator
- Bill Smith – art direction, design
