= Judy Nylon =

American artist based in London (born 1948)

Judy Nylon (born Judith Anne Niland in 1948) is a multidisciplinary American artist who moved to London in 1970. She was half of the punk rock music group Snatch, which also featured fellow American immigrant Patti Palladin. She had an influence on glam, punk and no wave music in New York City and London, although the bulk of this has not been preserved in any record. NME's Paul Tickell described her LP Pal Judy (1982), coproduced by Nylon and Adrian Sherwood, as "a classic rainy day bit of sound and song to drift away to."

Nylon is the subject of Brian Eno's song "Back in Judy's Jungle" and appeared in the video for the song "China My China", from his 1974 LP Taking Tiger Mountain (By Strategy). Eno credits Nylon as an influence in the genesis of ambient music in the liner notes of his 1975 LP Discreet Music, writing:

In January this year I had an accident. I was not seriously hurt, but I was confined to bed in a stiff and static position. My friend Judy Nylon visited me and brought me a record of 18th century harp music. After she had gone, and with some considerable difficulty, I put on the record. Having laid down, I realized that the amplifier was set at an extremely low level, and that one channel of the stereo had failed completely. Since I hadn't the energy to get up and improve matters, the record played on almost inaudibly. This presented what was for me a new way of hearing music - as part of the ambience of the environment just as the colour of the light and the sound of the rain were parts of that ambience.

In 1978, Eno and Snatch made "R.A.F." (b/w "Kings Lead Hat"), which involves sound elements from a Baader Meinhof ransom message as part of Nylon's sound montage/collage cut-up practice.

During the '70s she often collaborated with Welsh musician/producer John Cale. In 1974 she added spoken sections to the song "The Man Who Couldn't Afford to Orgy" on his album Fear. She subsequently performed with him at concerts and on other recordings, including his 1987 live album Even Cowgirls Get the Blues. Along with Patti Palladin, she also sang backing vocals with Johnny Thunders' All Stars on his early 1978 shows.

Since 2007 Nylon has periodically contributed to the collective Aether9, who collaborate on public art performances. Her multi-disciplinary work focuses on international co-authorship and decentralized many-to-many style video storytelling. In 2010, Nylon contributed guest vocals to the Babylon By Car album by the French electronica group Bot'Ox.
