= A. C. Bilbrew =

American poet (1891–1972)

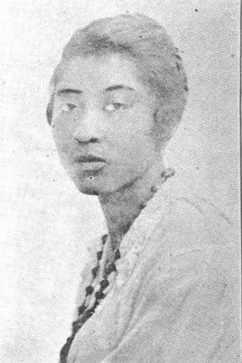
- A. C. Bilbrew from a 1919 publication.
- Born: March 12, 1891; Washington, Arkansas, U.S.
- Died: June 4, 1972 (aged 81); Los Angeles, California
- Other names: Madame Bilbrew, A. C. Harris Bilbrew, Aycee Bilbrew, Alice Caldonia Harris
- Occupations: radio host, composer, choir director
- Known for: "The Bronze Hour" radio program (1940s)
- Spouse: Ralph Bilbrew
- Relatives: Kitty White (daughter)

A. C. Harris Bilbrew (March 12, 1891 – June 4, 1972) was an American poet, musician, composer, playwright, clubwoman, and radio personality known as Madame A. C. Bilbrew. She lived in South Los Angeles. In 1923, she became the first black soloist to sing on a Los Angeles radio program. She also hosted the city's first African-American radio music program, The Gold Hour, in the early 1940s. The A.C. Bilbrew branch of the LA County Library in Willowbrook was named in her honor.

== Early life ==
A. C. Harris was from Tyler, Texas, the daughter of Rev. H.S. Harris. Her initials were her given name; she was named for two nuns whom her mother had liked. She attended Texas College in Tyler, and studied music at the University of Southern California.

== Career ==
Bilbrew was active in many ways with performing arts in the African-American community of South Los Angeles. She played church organ, produced pageants and plays, gave dramatic readings, accompanied a jubilee quartet, and directed choirs. In 1923 she became the first black soloist to sing on a Los Angeles radio program. In the 1930s she performed "pianologues" and led a musical sextet.

She was the host of the city's first African-American radio music program, The Gold Hour, broadcast on KGFJ from 1940 to 1942, and was also the announcer on The Bronze Hour, which she produced with Gilbert W. Lindsay. Her on-air guests included California governor Culbert Olson in 1942. She also performed on a tour of the eastern United States in the 1940s. She was a popular speaker in church and women's groups into the late 1960s, and was known as "Madame Bilbrew" in the community.

=== Poet and songwriter ===
Bilbrew wrote poems and songs, including the wartime poem "The Black Boys in Khaki" (1919), and songs "Black Boys of Uncle Sam" (1918), and "Let's Go, Americans" (1942). She wrote "This is Freedom Day", an anthem for National Freedom Day. In 1955, her choral composition, "The Death of Emmett Till", was performed by Scatman Crothers and the Ramparts and released as a single, with a percentage of the royalties benefiting the NAACP. "I feel strongly that this American folk song will live on and serve a purpose," Bilbrew commented at the time. One of her last songs was a peace anthem, "Let's Lay the Weapons Down and Join Hands" (1969).

=== Film ===
Bilbrew was also involved in several films. She was the musical arranger and director for the choir that appeared as cotton pickers singing spirituals in the Stepin Fetchit film Hearts in Dixie (1929), considered one of the first talking pictures with an all-black cast. She appeared as "Tante Caleen" in the film The Foxes of Harrow in 1947.

=== Politics ===
Bilbrew campaigned for Kenneth Hahn for Los Angeles County supervisor in 1952. In 1958, she was named director of a new Republican campaign office opened in South Los Angeles. She was later described by Hahn as the "first Negro woman to sing on radio in Los Angeles, pioneering the opportunity for young people to get into music, stage, radio and television." In 1960, she attended the International Women's Day Jubilee in Copenhagen, part of the 22-member delegation from the United States. By 1962, she was on the advisory board of the Independent Voters League of California. In 1963, she founded the Opportunity Workshop, a community arts, education, and empowerment program in south Los Angeles.

== Personal life and legacy ==
A.C. Harris married Ralph Bilbrew, a fellow performer. They had three daughters: Roberta, Kitty Jean, and Maudie Jeannette; all three daughters had musical careers. Kitty Bilbrew was later known as jazz singer Kitty White (1923-2009). A.C. Bilbrew died in 1972, aged 84 years.

The A. C. Bilbrew branch of the LA County Library, in Willowbrook, was named after her in 1974. It was designed by black architect Vincent J. Proby. This branch houses the African American Resource Center.
