= Give Him a Great Big Kiss =

1964 single by the Shangri-Las

- Dutch picture sleeve

Single by the Shangri-Las

from the album Leader of the Pack
- B-side: "Twist and Shout"
- Released: December 1964
- Genre: Pop; R&B
- Length: 2:12
- Label: Red Bird
- Songwriter(s): Shadow Morton
- Producer(s): Shadow Morton

The Shangri-Las singles chronology
"Leader of the Pack" (1964)	"Give Him a Great Big Kiss" (1964)	"Maybe" (1964)

"Give Him a Great Big Kiss" (sometimes titled "Great Big Kiss") is a song written by Shadow Morton and performed by the Shangri-Las. It was released as a single in December 1964, debuting at number 83 on the Billboard Hot 100 in late December, and peaking at number 18 for two weeks in late January and early February 1965. The song was the Shangri-Las' fifth single, their third to hit the charts, and later became the opening track on their 1965 debut album Leader of the Pack. It was produced by Shadow Morton and released by Red Bird Records.

== Critical reception ==
In a contemporary review, New Musical Express wrote: "This is a happy and tuneful disc with a great shake beat, and so much better than 'Leader of the Pack'."

The song was ranked number 200 among the greatest singles ever made in Dave Marsh's book The Heart of Rock & Soul (1989). Marsh describes the song as "one of the greatest pieces of teen dialogue ever recorded, not to mention possessed of a great beat." He highlights the bit "when the music virtually ceases except for basic drumbeats and a riffing trumpet," and the ensuing girls' dialogue ("I hear he's bad." "He's good bad, but he's not evil").

Pitchfork magazine named the song number 96 on its 2006 list of the best songs of the 1960s. In 2017, Billboard magazine's editorial staff ranked it number 51 on their list of the 100 greatest girl group songs of all time. In 2023, they listed the song number 481 on their 500 best pop songs of all time list.

== Promotion ==
The Shangri-Las promoted "Give Him a Great Big Kiss" on several TV shows, including Hullabaloo, Shindig!, The Lloyd Thaxton Show, Where The Action Is and Shivaree.

== Analysis ==
Musicology professor Jacqueline Warwick characterized the song's musical language as "upbeat and infectious" and added:

The song begins with Mary Weiss's spoken "When I say I'm in love, you'd best believe I'm in love, L-U-V!" setting the tone for a sassy and delightful declaration of adolescent love on the part of a confident girl. Rhythmically energetic percussive forces soon come to the fore, with a horn section and piano providing syncopated R&B-styled riffs over a harmonic foundation that alternates jauntily between the home key and its relative minor. At various points in the song, the backing vocalists collude with the horns to provide a fanfare-like riff that descends low into their range on the syllables "da da da," a light-hearted and amusing effect contributing to a cheerful mood.

== Personnel ==
The Shangri-Las

- Mary Weiss – lead vocals
- Marge Ganser – backing vocals
- Mary Ann Ganser – backing vocals
- Betty Weiss – backing vocals

Additional personnel

- Shadow Morton – producer
- Artie Butler – arranger

== Other versions ==
- Former New York Dolls guitarist Johnny Thunders released a studio version of the song on his debut solo album So Alone (1978) and a live cover on his 1983 compilation Too Much Junkie Business. The New Rolling Stone Encyclopedia of Rock & Roll saw the studio version as a nod to Thunders' musical roots "in girl-group sass". AllMusic called it a "rave-up" and a "terrific example of Thunders' raunchy take on classic R&B", while music critic Dave Thompson described it as "a delightfully hazy take on the Shangri-Las [song]".
- A version by the New York Dolls appears on their 1985 compilation album Night of the Living Dolls. Also, on the band's 1973 self-titled album, lead singer David Johansen quotes the "Give Him a Great Big Kiss" line, "you'd best believe I'm in love L-U-V", in the opening of "Looking for a Kiss". "Looking for a Kiss" tells the story of adolescent romantic desire hampered by peers who use drugs. The Shangri-Las' song, with the gender roles switched ("Give Her a Great Big Kiss"), was part of the Dolls' standard live set in the 1970s.
- In 1980, the Spanish rock band Burning released a version titled "Es especial" with lyrics in Spanish that was popular in Spain. No songwriting credits were given to Morton and there were accusations of plagiarism, with the band saying that they had asked the record label to find who wrote the song, which they knew from the Johnny Thunders' version only.
- A cover by Tracey Ullman was released in 1984 on her second studio album, You Caught Me Out.
- It's My Party! released a version of the song on their 2000 album Can I Get to Know You Better?
- Kate Nash and Billy Bragg released a cover as a duet on the B-side of Nash's 2010 single "Kiss That Grrrl". They had performed the song together at several gigs before this release.
- Bette Midler covered the song in 2014 for her fourteenth studio album, It's the Girls! Her version recasts the original's love interest as a 98 year old man who needs to be taken back to the hospital after he got out to spend time with the singer.
