= Story of a Junkie =

- Directed by: Lech Kowalski
- Produced by: Lech Kowalski
- Starring: John Spacely
- Cinematography: Raffi Ferrucci
- Edited by: Val Kuklowsky
- Music by: Chuck Kentis
- Distributed by: Troma Entertainment
- Release date: 1987
- Running time: 88 minutes
- Language: English

Story of a Junkie is a 1987 drama film directed by Lech Kowalski and starring John Spacely. Distributed by Troma Entertainment.

== Plot ==
Shot in a documentary style, the film follows Gringo, a young man who travels to New York City in search of fortune, only to fall into heroin addiction.

== Artistic features ==
The movie has amassed quite a reputation in certain circles for its depictions of hard drug usage in New York City's East Village area. Many of the cast members, including leading man John Spacely, are actual junkies. The numerous shooting-up sequences are reportedly entirely real, as are many of the drug dens and their denizens. Perhaps even more notable than the cinéma vérité structure is the almost total lack of moralizing on the part of the producers or its characters.

== Reception ==
Lead actor Spacely died in the early 1990s, reportedly from HIV, which he contracted through intravenous drug use. His final moments are chronicled in yet another Lech Kowalski film, Born to Lose: The Last Rock & Roll Movie, a documentary about deceased former New York Dolls guitarist Johnny Thunders.

Troma Entertainment hails Story of a Junkie as one of the company's best films; it is one of the most well known outside of the films directed by Troma founders Lloyd Kaufman and Michael Herz.
