= Ozzie Yue =

English actor, guitarist and singer

- Born: Austin J. Yue; 12 August 1947 (age 78); Liverpool, England

Austin J. "Ozzie" Yue (born 12 August 1947) is an English actor and musician. On television, he appeared in Father Ted (1998), All Quiet on the Preston Front (1994–1997) and Harry (1995). His films include Lara Croft: Tomb Raider (2001), Syriana (2005), and Nuns on the Run (1990).

In the 1960s, Yue was guitarist with Merseybeat group the Hideaways and later for the 1970s group Supercharge. He now has own band Yue Who. In 2008, he starred in the title role of Kensuke's Kingdom, a theatre production that toured the UK.

== Early life and education ==
Yue was born in Liverpool. His father, Jack, was a restaurateur, court translator and point of contact between Liverpool's Chinese and English communities. Yue went to junior schools in the Wirral and Skerry's School in Rodney Street, Liverpool. He then attended the Liverpool Institute High School for Boys as a contemporary of Paul McCartney and George Harrison, although junior to them. Yue has admitted that he did "flick pieces of paper" at McCartney during art classes.

== Musical career ==
After a spell as an apprentice electrician, Yue joined the Hideaways as guitarist during the Merseybeat era; he played at the Cavern Club more often than the Beatles. In the 1970s, he joined funk, soul & RnB group Supercharge, which achieved some reputation and local success, but failed to make an impression on the UK charts. They did however have a number 1 single in Australia in 1976. In the late 1970s he played with Liverpool band "Joker". Today Yue has his own RnB group playing locally, "Yue Who".

== Acting career ==
In his teens, Yue appeared in productions such as The King and I and South Pacific at the Royal Court Theatre, Liverpool. However, acting took a back seat during his musical career until the 1980s, when he began to be cast in British film and television, usually in stereotypical Chinese roles such as waiters and minor villains. He was initially offered work by Granada TV as an extra, and of this he says,

I was one of very few oriental-looking actors at that time. A London agent saw my photograph in casting and said 'you don't do any more extras work from now on'.

From the early 1990s onwards, Yue has appeared in numerous productions and in 2006 branched out into theatre, starring in Kensuke's Kingdom across the country and finally at London's Bloomsbury Theatre. In March/April 2015 he returned to the Liverpool stage playing the roles of Snug and Mustardseed in the Everyman Theatre production of A Midsummer Night's Dream.

In 2013, he played "Taxi Driver" in the BBC comedy-drama Being Eileen.

== Selected appearances ==
=== Television ===
- 1990 Agatha Christie's Poirot - Restaurant Manager
- 1990 London's Burning - Chinese Man
- 1992 Lovejoy - 'Flat Fee' Lee Chan
- 1992 To Be the Best - Bank President
- 1993 The Long Roads - Jimmy
- 1994 All Quiet on the Preston Front - Peter Wang
- 1994 The House of Windsor - Mr. Takasoni
- 1995 Porkpie - Mr Lu
- 1995 Harry - Tommy
- 1996 Porkpie - Mr Lu
- 1996 Thief Takers - Uncle Wong
- 1998 Father Ted - Sean Yin
- 1998 Dinnerladies - Malcolm
- 2004 Silent Witness - Micky Choo
- 2005 Meet the Magoons - Scouse Punter
- 2005 Waterwings - Father of Boy on YouTube
- 2005 Rocket Man - Mr. Xi
- 2011 Come Fly With Me - Taiwanese Man
- 2011 White Van Man - Mr. Chung
- 2012 Doctor Who - Foreman
- 2013 Being Eileen - "Taxi Driver"

=== Film ===
- 1990 Nuns on the Run - Ernie Wong
- 1998 Croupier - Mr Tchai
- 2001 Lara Croft: Tomb Raider - Aged Buddhist Monk
- 2003 Out for a Kill - Fang 'The Barber' Lee
- 2005 Syriana - Chinese Oil Executive
- 2008 Act of Grace - Dai-Lo
