= Hillbilly Moon Explosion =

European rockabilly band

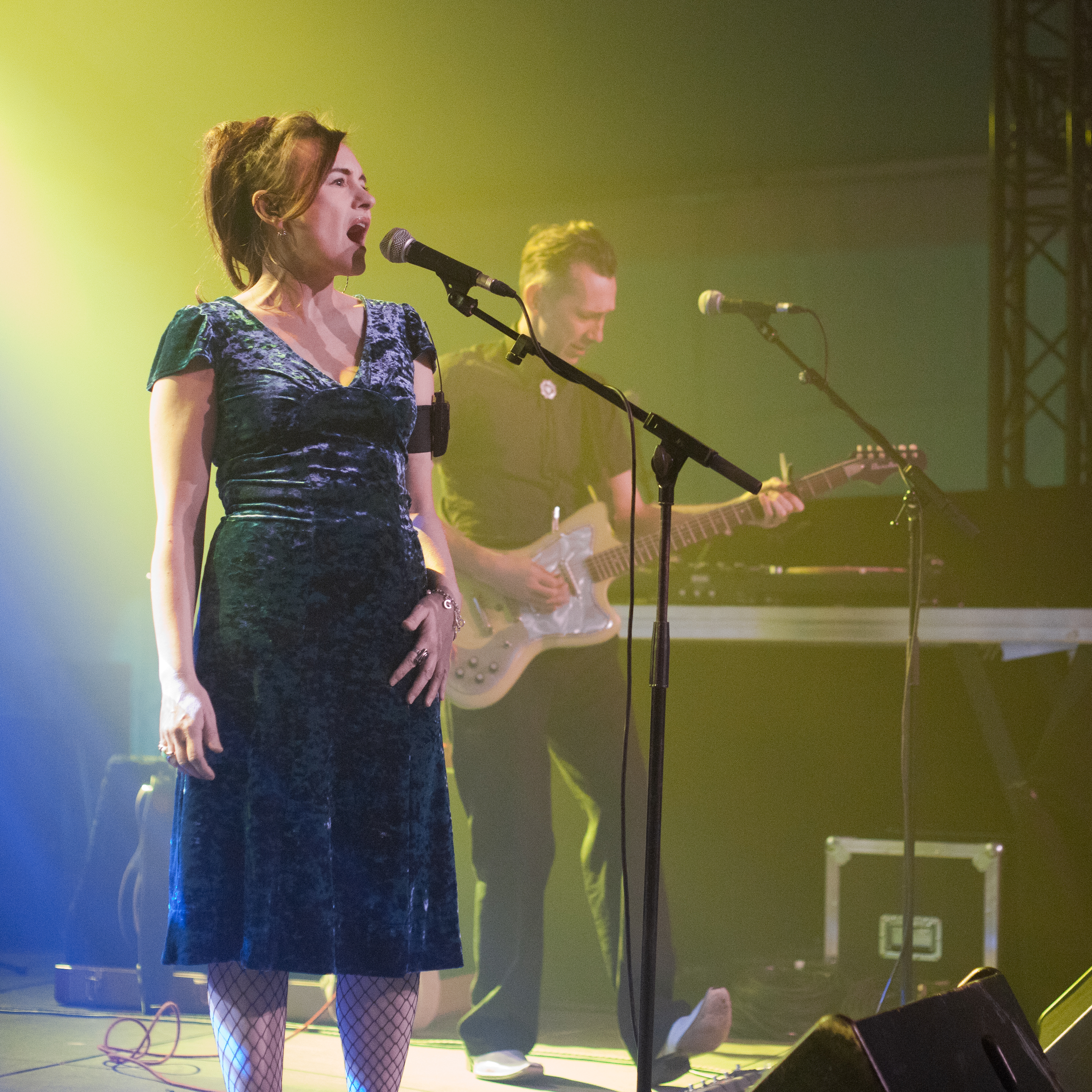
- The Hillbilly Moon Explosion performing at Leysin Nescafé in February 2011

Background information
- Origin: Zürich, Switzerland
- Genres: Rockabilly
- Years active: 1999–present
- Members: Oliver Baroni; Emanuela Hutter; Duncan James; Sylvain Petite
- Past members: Aad Hollander; Pat Matteo; Donovan Tose; Luke Weyermann

Hillbilly Moon Explosion is a Swiss rockabilly band founded in 1999. The group is known for a versatile mix of rock and roll, jump blues, swing, country, roots rock and surf music elements.

== History ==
Hillbilly Moon Explosion originated in 1999 as part of the Zürich rockabilly scene. The group was founded by the native English and Swiss citizen Oliver Baroni (vocals, bass, guitar) and Italian-Swiss singer Emanuela Hutter. Oliver Baroni was planning to leave his former band, the Hillbilly Headhunters. Emanuela Hutter worked with the singer/songwriter music project MD Moon at that time. The original formation was completed by drummer Aad Hollander and guitarist Pat Matteo, another former member of the Hillbilly Headhunters. The first demo tape was made in the same year. Emanuela Hutter was at the time bound by solo performances and did not enter the band until the following year.

In 2006 after the release of All Grown Up, Englishman Duncan James replaced Patrick Gese on guitar and Swiss Luke Weyermann the new drummer. Frenchman Sylvain Petite later took over drums.

In addition to touring and performing in Switzerland, the band have performed in other European countries including Germany, France, Spain, Italy, Finland, Slovenia, Croatia, Hungary, Poland, Austria and the UK. In 2010, Hillbilly Moon Explosion appeared as the opening act for Jeff Beck in Paris Olympia. In both 2018 and 2019, they also toured the west coast of the US.

The members of the group live in and around Zürich.

== Style and reviews ==
Although some media outlets rate the band as a very good rockabilly formation from Switzerland, Hillbilly Moon Explosion is still considered an underground band.

On the album Buy, Beg or Steal, in the song "My Love for Evermore", Hutter sang a duet with Mark "Sparky" Phillips from the British psychobilly group Demented Are Go. Further duets with Sparky appeared on the Damn Right Honey and With Monsters and Gods albums, and a full album of duets, The Sparky Sessions appeared in 2019.

== Current band members ==
- Oliver Baroni (vocals/upright bass)
- Emanuela Hutter (vocals/rhythm guitar)
- Duncan James (lead guitar/vocals)
- Sylvain Petite (drums)

== Discography ==
- Introducing The Hillbilly Moon Explosion (2002, Crazy Love Records)
- Bourgeois Baby (2004)
- By Popular Demand: The Basement Tapes (1999-2005) (2005, Crazy Love Records)
- All Grown Up (2006)
- Raw Deal (2010, The Freed)
- Buy, Beg or Steal (2011, The Freed; Jungle Records)
- Damn Right Honey! (2013, Goldtop Recordings/Jungle Records)
- French Kiss avec Arielle Dombasle (2015, Mercury Records/Universal Music France)
- With Monsters and Gods (2016, Jungle Records; The Freed; Cloud Hill)
- The Sparky Sessions feat. Mark “Sparky” Phillips (2019, Freedonia; Jungle Records)
- Back In Time (2024, Cleopatra Records)
