= The Hideaways (band) =

English pop group

- Origin: Liverpool, England, UK
- Genres: Merseybeat, rock and roll
- Years active: 1963–1970; 2009–present
- Members: Judd Lander; Ozzie Yue; Frankie Connor; Dave Goldberg; John Donaldson
- Past members: John Shell; Dave Collins; Richie Routledge; Chris Findley
- Website: www.thehideaways.info

The Hideaways are a rock group that flourished in the mid-1960s as part of the Merseybeat era, and played at The Cavern Club over 250 times, more frequently than The Beatles; they are also noted for their connection to the Timex Watches advertising campaign of the time.

== Career ==
The band formed in about October 1963 by Ozzie Yue (guitar, vocals), John Shell (bass guitar) and John Donaldson (drums); Frankie Connor joined three months later, followed by Judd Lander on harmonica.

The band were regulars at the historical Cavern club, and as a group, The Hideaways now hold the official world record for over 400 Cavern performances in both old and new venues. Journalist Alan Walsh, of Melody Maker magazine, stated in 1966 they were "one of the better known Liverpool groups" that made the club famous.

John Shell, American by birth, was drafted into the Vietnam War, and told the band that he would return to the cavern for his 21st birthday. Shell was killed in action in Saigon (modern day Ho Chi Minh City) on 1 February 1968, aged 20. He was replaced by Dave Collins. Also in 1968, Lander left the band to move to London and Richie Routledge, who sang in The Cryin' Shames, joined as vocalist.

In 1969, they changed their name to 'Confucius', and released their only single "The Brandenburg Concerto (That's What It Was)" on 30 January 1970. They spent three months touring Germany.

The band included famous personnel:

- Ozzie Yue, later to become a well-known actor
- Frankie Connor, a former BBC Radio Merseyside DJ who now broadcasts on Liverpool Live Radio on a Saturday afternoon.
- Judd Lander (harmonica / vocals) later to become a well-known London session musician, who performed on Spice Girls and Culture Club's worldwide No. 1 hits, along with performances on Paul McCartney, Annie Lennox, Beach Boys, and a host of other major artists albums, Lander became a director at various major record labels working closely with artists such as Michael Jackson, ABBA, The Ramones, Run DMC, Salt & Pepper, and instrumental in the breaking of Meat Loaf's multi-platinum album Bat Out Of Hell - now heads his own PR agency Lander PR Ltd.

Lander later played with Paul McCartney's Wings, provide harmonica for Culture Club's number 1 hit "Karma Chameleon" and become head of music for Warner Brothers UK.

In 2011, Findley was keyboardist for The Merseybeats. He died in 2016. Richie Routledge died on 8 October 2023.

The Hideaways reformed in 2009 and still tour today, with the surviving members of the classic 1960s lineup, along with new recruit Dave Goldberg on keyboards. Chris Findley was on bass with the new version from 2009 until his death in 2016.

== Members ==
- Judd Lander (vocalist from 1964 to 1968, 2009 onwards) (born 1 March 1948 in Liverpool, England)
- Ozzie Yue (guitarist from 1963 to 1970, 2009 onwards) (born 12 August 1947 in Liverpool, England)
- Frankie Connor (guitarist from 1964 to 1970, 2009 onwards) (born Frank O'Connor on 29 October 1946 in Liverpool, England)
- John Shell (bassist from 1963 to 1967) (born 9 April 1947 in Dallas, Texas, United States - died 1 February 1968 in Ho Chi Minh City, Vietnam)
- John Donaldson (drummer from 1963 to 1970, 2009 onwards) (born 31 August 1947 in Liverpool, England)
- Dave Collins (bassist from 1967 to 1970)
- Richie Routledge (vocalist from 1968 to 1970) (born 1949 in Liverpool, England - died 8 October 2023 in Nashville, Tennessee, United States)
- Chris Findley (bassist from 2009 to 2016) (born 1948 in Liverpool, England - died 2016)
- Dave Goldberg (keyboardist from 2009 onwards)

Timeline

== Discography ==
- "The Brandenburg Concerto (That's What It Was)" (1969) (released under name "Confucius")
