= Lech Kowalski =

American film director of Polish descent (born 1951)

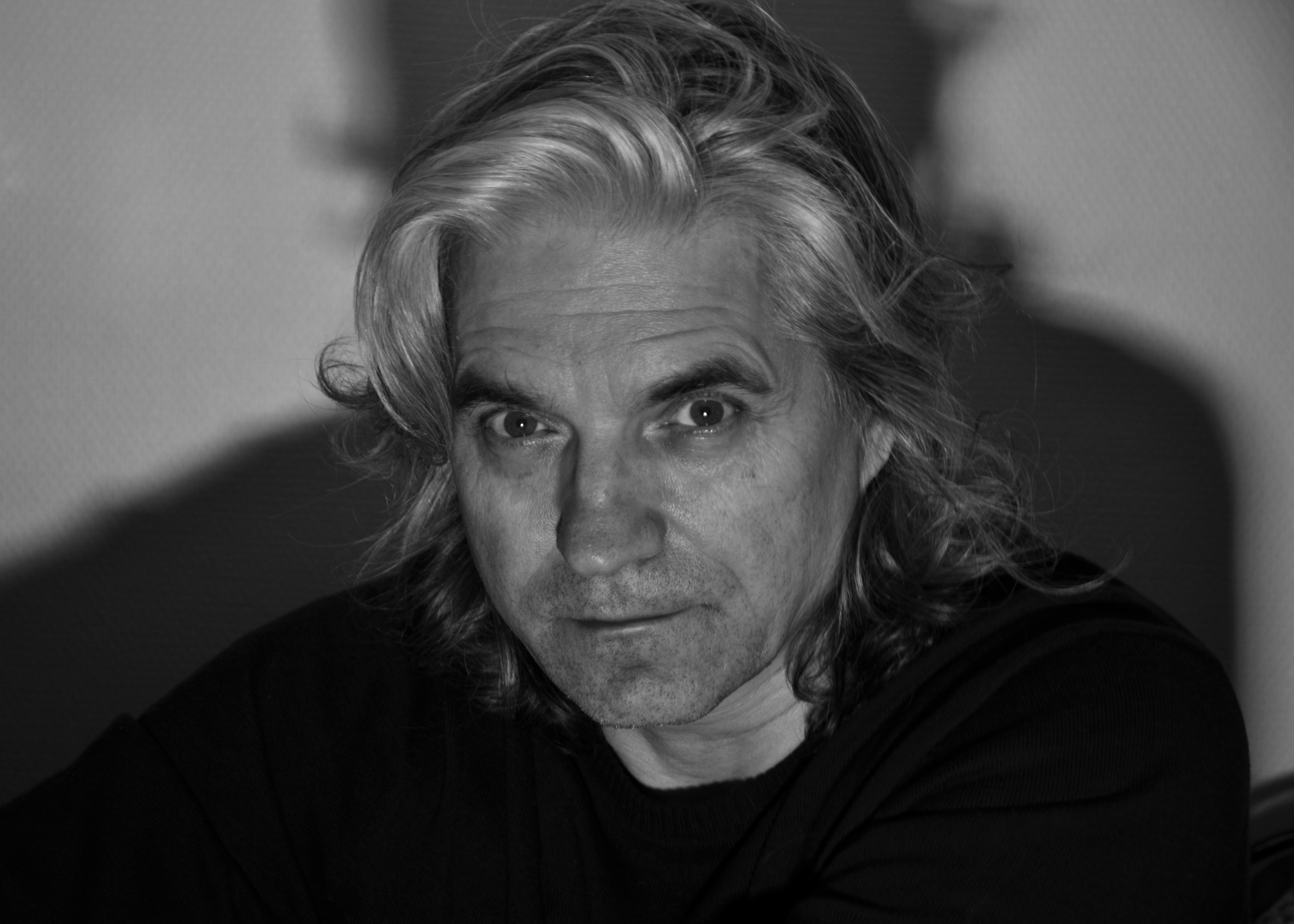
- Born: 1951 (age 74–75); London, England
- Occupations: Film director, screenwriter
- Years active: 1980–present

Lech Kowalski (born 1951) is an American film director of Polish descent. He was born in London to Polish parents.

His most notable film is the documentary, D.O.A., subtitled A Rite of Passage, which chronicled the burgeoning UK punk scene at the tail-end of the 1970s, and included footage of the Sex Pistols' abortive 1978 American tour. He also directed Story of a Junkie, a film starring John Spacely, and Born To Lose: The Last Rock and Roll Movie, about Johnny Thunders of the New York Dolls and The Heartbreakers. He also created Hey! Is Dee Dee Home?, which focused on Ramones bassist Dee Dee Ramone and his struggle with heroin addiction.

== Filmography ==
- D.O.A. (1980)
- Story of a Junkie (1987)
- Rock Soup (1991)
- Chico and the People (1992)
- Born To Lose: The Last Rock and Roll Movie (1999)
- The Boot Factory (2000)
- Hey! Is Dee Dee Home? (2002)
- On Hitler's Highway (2002)
- East of Paradise (2005), about his mother.
- Diary of a Married Man (2005)
- The End of The World Begin With A Lie (2010)
- Holy Field, Holy War (2013)
- Drill Baby Drill (documentary)|Drill Baby Drill / La malédiction du gaz de schiste / Gas-Fieber (2013)
- I Pay for Your Story (2015)
- Blow It to Bits (2019)
