= Pal Judy =

Studio album by Judy Nylon and Crucial
- Released: 1982
- Studio: The Manor, Shipton-on-Cherwell; Berry Street Studio, London; Britannia Row Studios, London
- Label: On-U Sound
- Producer: Adrian Sherwood, Judy Nylon

Pal Judy is an album by Judy Nylon and Crucial, released in 1982 by record label On-U Sound.

== Reception ==
Professional ratings
Review scores
Source	Rating
AllMusic	4/5 stars
The Attic	4/5 stars
Select	4/5 medals
Trouser Press	favourable

Trouser Press called it "a moody, adeptly created and performed record", while AllMusic called it a "dark, moody exercise in postmodern pop".

== Track listing ==
All tracks composed by Judy Nylon; except where indicated

1. "Information Rain"
2. "Dateline Miami" (Nylon, Chris Joyce, Sean Oliver)
3. "Live in a Lift"
4. "Jailhouse Rock" (Jerry Leiber, Mike Stoller)
5. "Trial By Fire" (Nylon, Patti Palladin)
6. "Sleepless Nights"
7. "Others"
8. "The Dice"
9. "Room Without a View"

== Personnel ==
- Judy Nylon - vocals
- Coco Charnel (Pascal Bourdariat), Kendall Ernest - guitar
- George Oban, Sean "Hogg" Oliver - bass guitar
- Nick Plytas - keyboards; vocals on "Jailhouse Rock"
- Chris Joyce, Dan Sheals - drums
- Eskimo Fox (Charles Kelly) - percussion on "The Dice"
- John Waddington - guitar on "Room Without a View"

Technical

- John Walker, Bob Z - engineer
