= Patti Palladin =

American singer and musician

Patti Palladin is an American singer and musician of the punk rock and post-punk/new wave genres. She is primarily known for her work with Snatch (with Judy Nylon), Johnny Thunders, and the Flying Lizards.

== Career ==
Palladin was a member of the punk duo Snatch, together with Judy Nylon in the mid 1970s, and she co-wrote the track "Trial by Fire" that appeared on the 1982 Judy Nylon album Pal Judy (with her backing band Crucial). Snatch was included in the expanded version of the influential Nurse with Wound list released as part of the artwork for the 1980 Nurse with Wound album, To the Quiet Men from a Tiny Girl. Snatch recorded the song "R.A.F." with Brian Eno, which was released on the 1982 EG Records compilation album First Edition and included audio samples from a Red Army Faction ransom message.

Palladin also worked extensively with Johnny Thunders of the Heartbreakers, the former lead guitarist for New York Dolls. Palladin appeared on Thunders' 1978 debut solo album So Alone and his 1985 album Que Sera Sera, and in 1988 they together released the album Copy Cats on Jungle Records. She and Thunders also recorded a 1984 cover of Fred Wise and Ben Weisman's "Crawfish" for Swamplands Records, the label started by Alan Horne after the dissolution of his original Postcard Records.

Palladin became a member of the Flying Lizards around 1980 and recorded the 1981 album Fourth Wall with them.

Palladin's "The Nuns New Clothes" appeared on 1983's The Batcave: Young Limbs And Numb Hymns on the London Records label.

== Personal life ==
Palladin had a personal relationship with Steve New (of Rich Kids and Gen X), who once assaulted David Bowie after Bowie showed a romantic interest in her. She was married to photographer Peter 'Kodik' Gravelle in the 1970s.
