= L.A.M.F. =

Studio album by the Heartbreakers
- Released: October 3, 1977
- Recorded: March 1977
- Studios: Essex (London); Ramport (London)
- Genres: Punk rock; rock and roll
- Length: 34:02
- Label: Track
- Producers: Speedy Keen; Daniel Secunda

The Heartbreakers chronology
L.A.M.F. (1977)	Live at Max's Kansas City (1979)

L.A.M.F. (abbreviation of Like a Motherfucker) is the only studio album by the American punk rock band the Heartbreakers, which included Johnny Thunders, Jerry Nolan, Walter Lure and Billy Rath. It was released on October 3, 1977, by the British independent record label Track Records, and the music of the album is a mixture of punk and rock and roll.

In a 1977 interview in the UK monthly magazine ZigZag, Thunders said the album title originated from New York gang graffiti. Thunders claimed the gangs would add the LAMF tag after writing their gang name. However, if they were on another gang's territory they would write "D.T.K.L.A.M.F" (Down to Kill Like a Mother Fucker). The original, vinyl release of the album has been criticised for having a lackluster sound despite several attempts to remix it.

== Background ==
The Heartbreakers had been trying to get a record contract in the United States since their formation in 1975.

In the autumn of 1976, Malcolm McLaren, who had informally managed the New York Dolls in their waning days, invited the band to come to England and participate in the Sex Pistols' Anarchy tour, along with The Clash and The Damned, who were replaced by Buzzcocks shortly after the tour commenced. The band accepted the offer, arriving in London on December 1, the same day that the Pistols swore at Bill Grundy on live, prime-time television, which precipitated the cancellation of most of the tour.

Stranded in England with little money after the Anarchy tour came to a halt, the band contemplated a retreat to New York, but their manager, Leee Black Childers, convinced them to stay in England, believing that they would be more successful there. After several gigs in London, Track Records offered the Heartbreakers a recording contract.

Track asked the band to sign to the company as "The Chris Stamp Band Ltd." a holding company owned by Track, with the proviso that if that holding company went out of business, the rights to any recordings the band made would revert to the band's own business partnership. The band agreed and signed on to Track.

== Recording session order ==
The band prepared for the album with a three-day demo session at Essex Studios in late February 1977, followed by two live shows at London's Speakeasy Club, which were recorded by Track Records for future release.

Six songs: "All By Myself," "Let Go," "Get Off The Phone," "I Wanna Be Loved," "Can't Keep My Eyes On You," and "I Love You" were recorded at Essex with Track staff and Motörhead producer Speedy Keen. The band then switched to Ramport Studios (owned by The Who) to record eight more songs. During a break in the recording, the Who's Pete Townshend invited the Heartbreakers to appear as extras in the movie version of Quadrophenia.

== Post-production ==
Mixing the recording was problematic. The band went to different studios, each member trying their own mixes. Each mix would be considered and rejected, after which band members returned to the studio to try to remix it. The band was later alleged to have used taxicabs to commute between London and Birmingham, billed to Track Records, to replenish their drug supply. The mixing sessions lasted through the summer of 1977, as they continued playing live.

== Critical reception ==
Professional ratings
Review scores
Source	Rating
AllMusic	4/5 stars
The Encyclopedia of Popular Music	4/5 stars
Pitchfork	8.4/10
Q	4/5 stars
Record Collector	4/5 stars
Spin Alternative Record Guide	8/10
Uncut	5/5 stars

L.A.M.F. would be released by Track Records on October 3, 1977, and reached No. 55 on the UK Albums Chart during its one-week stint on the charts. Critic Jon Savage wrote in Sounds magazine, "The sounds (mostly) are great, the playing assured ... so what's the problem? The mixing. The fantasy that they are includes an element of self-destruction, and here's where it operates — they can't seem to get it quite right ... Whichever way, some of the songs ... sound muddy — irritating 'cause you know how good they could be."

Jerry Nolan told the rest of the band that if the album was released "without a proper mix", he would see no reason to remain in the band. Nolan quit during a UK tour, during which time Sex Pistols drummer Paul Cook filled in, until Nolan was asked to return as a hired hand.

Music critic Robert Christgau named the album one of the few import-only records from the 1970s he loved yet omitted from Christgau's Record Guide: Rock Albums of the Seventies (1981).

== Remixed and remastered versions ==
After Track Records went out of business, manager Leee Black Childers acquired The Heartbreakers' tapes; the Essex demos, the Speakeasy live recordings and the masters from the L.A.M.F. sessions, including thirty-five reels full of various mixes, from the Track Records offices, due in part to the contract provision the band signed early in 1977.

In 1982, the rights to The Heartbreakers' tapes were acquired from Childers, acting on behalf of the band partnership, by Jungle Records, an independent English label. Jungle convinced Thunders and former Generation X bassist Tony James (then with Sigue Sigue Sputnik) to remix L.A.M.F..

In 1994, Jungle Records executive Alan Hauser had The Heartbreakers' tapes reviewed, and had the best available mixes preserved on Digital Audio Tape. It was soon discovered by Hauser that many of the original mixes left behind by The Heartbreakers were best suited to the band's protopunk sound, while others had a sound similar to sixties pop hits. It was realized that the problem with the sound on the original Track Records release of L.A.M.F. was due to the manufacturing of the vinyl records. A rare cassette edition, released by Track at the same time, was said to "[sound] as if it had a shower, shave, coffee and a cigarette" (liner notes of 2002 reissue by Nina Antonia, p. 10).

The 300-plus available mixes were narrowed down to a shortlist of 50 tracks, and London-area friends and colleagues of Johnny Thunders, including sometime Thunders collaborator Patti Palladin and journalist Nina Antonia, were asked for their input.

The first edition of what is sometimes referred to as L.A.M.F.: The Lost '77 Mixes was released by Jungle in 1994. Eight years later, a remastered edition, appended with an MPEG video of "Chinese Rocks", was released. In 2012 Jungle released L.A.M.F.: Definitive Edition.

In 2021, Jungle located a copy master of the 1977 sessions that belonged to the co-producer, Daniel Secunda. It was released as L.A.M.F. the found '77 masters, firstly as a Record Store Day vinyl LP and then on CD together with a second disc of demo recordings. It was reported to not suffer from the original album's sound problems.

== Track listing ==
All tracks written by Johnny Thunders except where noted.

L.A.M.F. track listing
No.	Title	Writer(s)	Length
1.	"Born to Lose"		3:04
2.	"Baby Talk"		2:21
3.	"All by Myself"	Walter Lure, Jerry Nolan	2:50
4.	"I Wanna Be Loved"		2:38
5.	"It's Not Enough"		4:08
6.	"Chinese Rocks"	Dee Dee Ramone, Thunders, Nolan, Richard Meyers (Note: 1994 vinyl releases of The Lost '77 Mixes credit the song to Ramone/Ramone/Hell; later releases again amended the credits to Dee Dee Ramone, Joey Ramone and Johnny Ramone, with Richard Hell uncredited completely.)	2:54
7.	"Get off the Phone"	Lure, Nolan	1:59
8.	"Pirate Love"		3:56
9.	"One Track Mind"	Lure, Nolan	2:32
10.	"I Love You"		2:21
11.	"Goin' Steady"		2:42
12.	"Let Go"	Thunders, Nolan	2:24

L.A.M.F. (The Lost '77 Mixes) track listing
No.	Title	Writer(s)	Length
13.	"Can't Keep My Eyes on You"	Lure, Nolan	3:44
14.	"Do You Love Me"	Berry Gordy, Jr.	2:15

== Personnel ==
The Heartbreakers

- Johnny Thunders - lead and backing vocals, lead and rhythm guitar, acoustic guitar on "It's Not Enough"
- Walter Lure - backing and lead vocals, rhythm and lead guitar
- Billy Rath - bass guitar
- Jerry Nolan - drums, backing vocals

Technical

- Speedy Keen - production
- Daniel Secunda - production
- Roberta Bayley - cover photography

== Charts ==
Weekly chart performance for L.A.M.F.
Chart (1977)	Peak position
UK Albums (Official Charts)	55

Weekly chart performance for L.A.M.F. – The Found 77 Masters
Chart (2021)	Peak position
Scottish Albums (Official Charts)	69
UK Independent Albums (Official Charts)	22

== Sources ==
- liner notes of Jungle Records 2002 edition of L.A.M.F., by Nina Antonia with comments by Walter Lure.
- Johnny Thunders - In Cold Blood, Nina Antonia, Cherry Red Books (2000) ISBN 1-901447-15-4.
- Punk Diary: The Ultimate Trainspotter's Guide To Underground Rock, George Gimarc, Backbeat Press (2005) ISBN 0-87930-848-6
- Trouser Press Record Guide online entry on Heartbreakers
- Johnny Thunders Cyber Lounge
- Johnny Thunders chronological info
