= Kitty White =

American jazz singer (1923–2009)

- Born: Kitty Jean Bilbrew; July 7, 1923; Los Angeles, California, U.S.
- Died: August 11, 2009 (aged 86) Palm Springs, California, U.S.
- Genres: Jazz, gospel, pop, spiritual
- Occupation: Singer
- Labels: Mercury, Capitol, Pacific Jazz

Kitty Jean Bilbrew (July 7, 1923 – August 11, 2009), known professionally Kitty White, was an American jazz singer who was popular in Los Angeles nightclubs.

She recorded mostly on the West Coast with Buddy Collette, Gerald Wiggins, Chico Hamilton, Bud Shank and Red Callender. She sang many demo recordings for her friend Los Angeles blues composer Jessie Mae Robinson, including "I Went to Your Wedding", a No. 1 hit for Patti Page in 1953. She was also the sole female voice on Elvis Presley's "Crawfish" from the King Creole film soundtrack.

She sang the title song, "Riders to the Stars", for the 1954 sci-fi film of the same name.

== Early life ==
Kitty Jean Bilbrew was born on July 7, 1923, in Los Angeles, California. She had a twin sister, Maudie, and was raised in a musical family: her parents A. C. Bilbrew and Ralph Bilbrew were singers, and her uncle was a well-known vaudevillian and disc jockey.

== Career ==
She started her career at the age of sixteen as a singer and a pianist. She appeared in local night clubs in her home town Los Angeles like the Hob Nob, the Club Gala, the Haig and The Captain's Table. When Kitty branched out and opened at the Black Orchid in Chicago, Illinois, she was introduced to the executives of Mercury Records, and she became a Mercury recording artist.

Her twin sister, Maudie Jeanette, also sang and briefly worked with Duke Ellington's revue, Jump for Joy, but never pursued an active career. Their mother, known as A.C. Bilbrew, organized an all-black chorus that performed in the 1929 film Hearts of Dixie. A.C. later recorded the 1955 protest song "The Death of Emmett Till" for Dootone Records.

Kitty picked up her catchy jazz name legitimately by marrying songwriter Eddie White in the 1940s. She moved to Palm Springs, California in 1967 and sang at the Spa Hotel for sixteen years.

Her first cousin was pianist Dudley Brooks, who also recorded with Elvis Presley as a session piano player at the Radio Recorders studio in Los Angeles.

White died in Palm Springs, at the age of 86, after suffering a stroke.

== Discography ==
=== Kitty White albums ===
- 1955 A New Voice in Jazz (EmArcy)
- 1956 Kitty White (EmArcy) (with Corky Hale, harp)
- 1956 A Moment of Love (Pacific) (with Corky Hale, harp)
- 1956 Cold Fire! (EmArcy)
- 1957 Folk Songs/And Now For Your Musical Enjoyment (Mercury)
- 1959 Sweet Talk (Roulette)
- 1962 Newborn (Horizon) (with Laurindo Almeida, Buddy Collette and Red Mitchell)
- 1966 Kitty White (Clover)

=== Compilations ===
- 2007 A New Voice in Jazz (Fresh Sound Records) (CD reissue of 1st album, plus the album Sweet Talk)
- 2008 Cold Fire! & Folk Songs (Fresh Sound Records)

=== With others ===
- 1958 King Creole, Elvis Presley soundtrack album (RCA Victor). White sings a duet on "Crawfish"
