= In Cold Blood (Johnny Thunders album) =

Studio album by Johnny Thunders
- Released: 1983
- Recorded: 1982
- Genres: Punk rock; garage rock
- Label: New Rose Records
- Producers: Jimmy Miller, Johnny Thunders

Johnny Thunders chronology
Too Much Junkie Business (1983)	In Cold Blood (1983)	Hurt Me (1984)

Professional ratings
Review scores
Source	Rating
Uncut	2/5 stars

In Cold Blood is a 1983 double album by Johnny Thunders. The In Cold Blood album contains studio recordings and the Live LP contains live recordings.

== Tracklist ==
- In The Studio Side A tracks recorded at Downtown Studios, Boston, October 1982
- In The Studio Side B tracks recorded at Euphoria Sound Studios, Revere, March 1982
- The Live LP recorded at Jonathan Swift's, Cambridge 6th August 1982

All tracks composed by Johnny Thunders; except where indicated

In the Studio

Side A
No.	Title	Length
1.	"In Cold Blood"
2.	"Just Another Girl"

Side B
No.	Title	Length
3.	"Green Onions" (Steve Cropper, Booker T. Jones, Lewis Steinberg, Al Jackson, Jr.)
4.	"Diary of a Lover"
5.	"Look in My Eyes"

The Live LP

Side A
No.	Title	Length
1.	"Intro"
2.	"Just Another Girl"
3.	"Too Much Junkie Business"
4.	"Sad Vacation"
5.	"Louie Louie" (Richard Berry)

Side B
No.	Title	Length
6.	"Gloria" (Van Morrison)
7.	"Treat Me Like a Nigger"
8.	"Do You Love Me" (Berry Gordy, Jr.)
9.	"Green Onions" (Steve Cropper, Booker T. Jones, Lewis Steinberg, Al Jackson, Jr.)
10.	"10 Commandments"

== Personnel ==
- Johnny Thunders - guitar, vocals
- Walter Lure - guitar, vocals
- Joe Mazzari - bass, guitar
- Billy Rogers - drums
- Simon Ritt - bass on "Louie Louie" and "Gloria" live versions
- Keith Chagnon - drums on "Louie Louie" and "Gloria" live versions
