= Crawfish (song) =

Single by Kitty White and Elvis Presley

from the album King Creole
- Released: 1958
- Recorded: January 15, 1958; Radio Recorders, West Hollywood, California
- Genre: Jazz, blues
- Songwriters: Fred Wise, Ben Weisman
- Producer: Walter Scharf

"Crawfish" is a song written by Fred Wise (lyrics) and Ben Weisman (music) and recorded as a duet by Elvis Presley and jazz singer Kitty White (Kitty Jean Bilbrew).

It was the opening song for Presley's 1958 film King Creole.

British musician and Clash frontman Joe Strummer described "Crawfish" on his radio-show as one of his favourite Elvis Presley songs. The song and his recommendation were included on the soundtrack to the 2007 documentary Joe Strummer: The Future Is Unwritten.

== Recording ==
Presley and Bilbrew recorded the song on January 15, 1958, during the soundtrack recording session for the Paramount movie, King Creole at Radio Recorders, West Hollywood, California. The producer was Walter Scharf, the sound engineer Thone Nogar. At least eight takes were recorded; the master is take seven.

In 1978, Bilbrew released an alternate master mix (with overdubs recorded in 1978) including the full length intro sung by herself. This version runs 4 minutes and 10 seconds.

== Cover versions ==
The song has been covered a number of times, arguably the most well-known is by Johnny Thunders and Patti Palladin released in 1985, reaching the top five on the UK Indie Chart across a 12-week stint and was later included on their Copy Cats covers album in 1988. The Bonedaddys recorded the song in 1989 and the Drugstore Cowboys in 2008. Stan Campbell and Farmhouse have also recorded the song.
