= Jungle Records =

- Founded: 1982
- Status: Active
- Genre: punk rock, post punk, gothic, alternative
- Country of origin: United Kingdom
- Official website: www.jungle-records.net

Jungle Records is a British independent record label established in 1982 by former employees of Fresh Records (UK), specializing in punk rock, post punk, gothic, and alternative releases.

== History ==
From 1982 to 1986, they were an early independent record distributor and were associate members of the Cartel, in collaboration with Rough Trade, Red Rhino and the other regional members. They held the exclusive right to sell records from The Cartel and all indie labels, including those by Depeche Mode, New Order, and The Smiths, into the leading Our Price Records chain.

== Artists ==
The label has recorded albums by Johnny Thunders such as Copy Cats (with Patti Palladin) and Que Sera Sera. They control the Johnny Thunders & The Heartbreakers tape library, including their L.A.M.F. album.

They discovered and released the first recordings by Mercury Rev: Yerself Is Steam and Car Wash Hair. They also released the earliest and later recordings by Fields of the Nephilim.

They have released recordings by artists and bands such as Alternative TV, Sid Vicious, Sky Saxon, The Seeds, Newtown Neurotics, Jimi Hendrix, Play Dead, The March Violets, UK Subs, King Kurt, The Adicts, Broken Bones, Sigue Sigue Sputnik, Test Dept, Nina Simone, Family Fodder, Christian Death, The Eden House, Specimen, The Slits, Jayne County, Wendy James, Tyla Gang, Wasted Youth, Cuddly Toys, Ducks Deluxe, Sterling Roswell, Wilko Johnson, The Waldos, The Hillbilly Moon Explosion, and Creaming Jesus.

== Labels and publishing ==
Jungle Records has amalgamated other labels over the years, such as French label Skydog Records (Iggy & the Stooges 'Metallic KO', and other Iggy Pop releases, albums by Flamin' Groovies, MC5, Kim Fowley, and New York Dolls and many others), Big Cat Records (Carter the Unstoppable Sex Machine, Cop Shoot Cop, etc.) and Red Records (The Lines, etc.). Through their sub-label imprint Goldtop Recordings in collaboration with Goldtop Studio, they have released albums by Geraint Watkins, Martin Belmont, and Hillbilly Moon Explosion.

Other labels owned or administered by Jungle Records include Fall Out Records, Fresh Records, Red Records, Mint Films, and Middle Earth. Over the years they've acted as distributor for various renowned indie labels, such as Flicknife Records, Mortarhate and Cleopatra Records.

They also operate as a music publisher under the name Jungle Music, publishing over a quarter of their music catalogue. As a book publisher, they released Johnny Thunders...In Cold Blood by Nina Antonia in 1987; now in a third edition on Jawbone Press. In 2014, they co-produced the film Looking For Johnny: The Legend of Johnny Thunders, directed by Danny Garcia.

== See also ==
- List of record labels
