= Nina Antonia =

English author

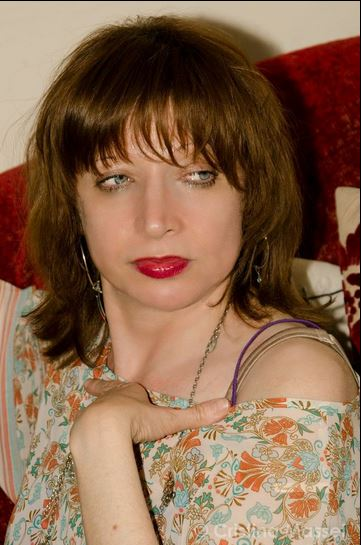
- Antonia in 2014
- Born: Nina Antonia Benjamin; 1960 (age 65–66)
- Occupation: Author

Nina Antonia (born Nina Antonia Benjamin in 1960) is an English author who has chronicled the lives and misadventures of Johnny Thunders, the New York Dolls, Peter Perrett, and Brett Smiley. Antonia's later work explored decadent and supernatural themes, which led to the novel, The Greenwood Faun, as well as the editorship of "Incurable"- The Haunted Writings of Lionel Johnson, the Decadent Era's Dark Angel.

== Background ==
Antonia is featured in the Sundance nominated documentary New York Doll alongside Morrissey, Mick Jones and Iggy Pop and can be seen in Danny Garcia's poignant documentary Looking For Johnny. Antonia also appears in Garcia's 2019 documentary, Stiv – No Compromise, No Regrets about Stiv Bators. As well as appearing on Radio One and Radio Six, Antonia has performed at spoken word events and enjoyed a retrospective of her work at the Barbican curated by Jay Clifton. Clifton commented: "The special value of Nina's oeuvre lies not so much in her subjects but in her personal commitment to both the documentation of them and a search for the truth about both their character and their cultural significance. Like the best writers, she begins with personal fascinations. But with a balance of personal feelings and objective contemplation, combined with a fluid literary style, she writes books that resonate beyond the parameters of the surface material." In 2013, Antonia lectured on Glam at Tate Liverpool.

Antonia was born in Liverpool. Her first book, Johnny Thunders... In Cold Blood (Jungle Records, 1987), which has been in print for over 25 years, was hailed by the New Musical Express as "gorgeously sordid". In 2012, the book was optioned by a Hollywood production company. A deluxe Italian translation of the Thunders book appeared in late 2015 from Pipeline Books.

In March 2015, Antonia's The One and Only: Peter Perrett, Homme Fatale was re-published by Thin Man Press. The new, expanded edition was hailed as "a ravishing read" and "an engrossing account". Reviewer Gus Ironside, writing in Louder than War suggested that Nina Antonia merits a far higher media profile but has been "excluded from the 'Boys' Club' of mainstream rock journalism". Antonia appeared in conversation with Perrett at the Albert Hall to coincide with the new edition.

Antonia's debut supernatural novel The Greenwood Faun published by Egaeus Press in December 2017 received glowing reviews. Acutely described by cult musician and author David Tibet of Current 93 as "Shot through with decadence, poetry, opium and incense ... this is a beautifully written poem: witty, crepuscular, enchanting, surprising." Em Chuter—Pagan Dawn wrote, "This book is pure magic. The style of the writing is complex and intricate. Weaving a heady dream like path through Romantic poets, aristocratic London, Pan and the old Pagan covens of the New Forest—supplemented with a hefty dose of whiskey and absinthe—this is a glorious indulgence for all the senses. If you want to lose yourself for a couple of days The Greenwood Faun is nothing short of an intoxicating swirl of incense for the mind." Also reviewed by Mark Andresen in Pan Review and Michael Dirda for the Washington Post.

Released by Strange Attractor Press in October 2018, 'Incurable': The Haunted Writings of Lionel Johnson, the Decadent Era's Dark Angel was edited by Nina Antonia and includes her detailed biographical essay of Johnson. "Like a glimmering of a votive candle in one of Johnson's dream churches, Incurable sheds new light on one of the most gifted, if reclusive, poets of the fin-de-siecle. Incurable pays tribute to this enchanting and eccentric poet while providing fresh insight into an era that continues to fascinate," wrote Cathleen Mair (The Idler). Incurable also has been included in articles by Michael Dirda for the Washington Post, Duncan Fallowell of The Spectator, and Eric Hoffman of the Fortean Times.

Nina Antonia's book, Dancing With Salomé – Courting the Uncanny with Oscar Wilde & Friends (Trapart Press 2021), unmasks the occult aspects of Oscar Wilde's celebrated tome The Picture of Dorian Gray, whilst exploring how the unseen is manifested not just in the famous author's life but in the life of his love interest, Lord Alfred Douglas. "A fateful destiny: Uncanny happenings and anecdotes: this portrait of Oscar Wilde and his troubled friends is a decadent delight," says Christopher Josiffe in Fortean Times.

Talking to BBC News Online, Antonia explained in folkloric terms why the killing of a white deer is considered unlucky, as they are considered messengers from the Faery realm. In Christian tracts they are perceived as creatures of divinity and, in Celtic myths, of enchantment.

Antonia has been a regular contributor to Fortean Times since 2017. Her articles on Lionel Johnson (2017) and 'Postcards from Fairyland' (June 2023) were both featured cover stories. A shorter feature on the uncanny elements of Oscar Wilde's life appeared in the run up to the release of Dancing With Salome (Trapart Press).

== Selected works ==
- Johnny Thunders...In Cold Blood. Jungle Books. 1987.
- The One and Only: Peter Perrett, Homme Fatale. SAF Publishing. 1996.
- The New York Dolls – Too Much Too Soon. Omnibus Press. 2005.
- The Prettiest Star: Whatever Happened to Brett Smiley. SAF Publishing. 2006.
- 13 Knots - Collected Poetry and Prose. TBMr Records. 2013.
- Doherty, Peter (2014). Nina Antonia (ed.). From Albion to Shangri-La. Thin Man Press. "Transcribed"
- Antonia, Nina (2015). The One & Only: Peter Perrett, Homme Fatale. Thin Man Press.
- Antonia, Nina (2017). The Greenwood Faun. Egaeus Press.
- Nina Antonia, ed. (2018). Incurable The Haunted Writings of Lionel Johnson, the Decadent Era's Dark Angel. Strange Attractor Press.
- Antonia, Nina. "The Doom of Oscar Wilde". Fortean Times. No. 422. p. 54.

== Movies ==
- New York Doll (Documentary on Arthur Kane, 2005)
- Looking for Johnny (Documentary on Johnny Thunders, 2014)
- Stiv - No Compromise, No Regrets (Documentary on Stiv Bators, 2019)

== Music ==
- Nina Antonia and The Lunar Moths - Dropping Like Butterflies LP/CD (2026, Creation Youth Music)
