= Walter Lure =

American guitarist and singer (1949–2020)

- Born: Walter Luhr Jr. April 22, 1949; New York City, U.S.
- Died: August 21, 2020 (aged 71)
- Occupation: Musician
- Instruments: Guitar; vocals

Walter Lure (born Walter C. Luhr Jr., April 22, 1949 – August 21, 2020) was an American rock guitarist and singer. He was a member of the rock group The Heartbreakers.

== Biography ==
Lure was born in Queens and raised in Floral Park, Long Island. He graduated from Fordham University with a degree majoring in English literature and minoring in chemistry, and was working at the Food and Drug Administration in New York while playing in a variety of local groups. He initially met Johnny Thunders in the early 1970s while attending concerts at the Fillmore East, and later became a fan of Thunders' group the New York Dolls. When the Dolls broke up in early 1975, Lure was playing in a glam rock band called the Demons, and successfully auditioned to join Thunders' new band The Heartbreakers. Lure's first gig with the Heartbreakers was at CBGB on July 4, 1975. As he wrote in his autobiography, "My last gig with the Demons was back at CBGB on the Friday of July 4 weekend, performing in front of about twenty people at two in the morning. My first gig with the Heartbreakers was the following evening in front of several hundred screaming maniacs, with a line around the block as well. It was a madhouse."

The Heartbreakers quickly became very popular in New York City, and after relocating to London, released their first album, L.A.M.F., in 1977. Although flawed by a poor mix, the album is considered a classic of early punk rock. Lure wrote and co-wrote many of the songs on the album, such as "One Track Mind", "Too Much Junkie Business", "All By Myself", and "Get Off The Phone", but the band broke up shortly after the album was released. The band line-up of Johnny Thunders (guitar/vocals), Lure (guitar/vocals), Jerry Nolan (drums ) and Billy Rath (bass) did continue to perform "reunion" shows in New York City throughout the 1980s, and reunited for a England/European tour in 1984. Lure played regularly with Thunders until his death in 1991.

After the Heartbreakers broke up, Lure continued to be active musically. At the end of the 1970s, he formed The Waldos, who released an album titled Rent Party in 1995. The Waldos performed regularly in New York City with various line-ups throughout the 1990s and 2000s, and released a second album in 2018. In 2016, with former Planets guitarist Binky Philips, Lure formed The Last Ditches, which was rounded out by former Black Sabbath drummer Bobby Rondinelli and bassist Randy Pratt. The Last Ditches released a full-length LP entitled “Spilt Milk” in 2016. Lure also performed on two albums by the Ramones, Subterranean Jungle and Too Tough To Die.

To celebrate the 40th anniversary of L.A.M.F., Lure put together a band to play the album's songs at reunion shows in 2016 and 2017. The band members included Lure, Clem Burke from Blondie, Jesse Malin, Mike Ness from Social Distortion, and former Sex Pistol Glen Matlock. The band played shows in New York City as well as a short West Coast tour. The reunion shows in New York took place at the Bowery Electric in Manhattan on November 15 and 16, 2016, and were recorded for the release on an album released on Jungle Records in December 2017 with Lure (guitar/vocals), Wayne Kramer (guitar), Tommy Stinson (bass), Clem Burke (drums), and special guests Jesse Malin (vocals), Liza Colby (vocals) and Cheetah Chrome (guitar). Glen Matlock was to have been in the band line-up but was replaced by Stinson for the 2016 Bowery Electric performances. Matlock did appear with the band for the 2017 dates in New York and California. Several more shows followed, including a small UK tour in 2019 featuring Mick Rossi (guitar & vocals), Nigel Mead (Bass), and Mark Laff (drums).

Lure had a "very unpunk second act" after leaving the Heartbreakers. He took an entry-level job on Wall Street in the early 1980s, and after quitting heroin (to which he had become addicted while in the Heartbreakers), he became a successful asset manager, eventually working for Lehman Brothers until the firm went bankrupt in the 2008 crash. He spent the final part of his finance career at Neuberger Berman until retiring in 2015.

In early 2020, Lure published his memoir, To Hell And Back: My Life In Johnny Thunders’ Heartbreakers, In The Words Of The Last Man Standing. He died on August 21, 2020, at the age of 71, from complications arising from liver and lung cancer.

== Discography ==
- L.A.M.F. (1977, Track)
  - L.A.M.F. Revisited (1984, Jungle)
  - L.A.M.F. The Lost '77 Mixes (1994, Jungle)
- Live at Max's Kansas City (1979, Max's Kansas City Records)
- D.T.K. Live At The Speakeasy (1982, Jungle)
- Live At The Lyceum Ballroom 1984 (1985, Jungle)
- Live At Mothers (1991, Fanclub)
- What Goes Around (1991, Bomp!)
- Vive La Révolution (Live In Paris - Le Bataclan - December 8th 1977) (1992, Skydog)
- Thunderstorm in Detroit (Live At The Silverbird 21/12/80) (2002, Captain Trip Records)
- Down To Kill (2005, Jungle)
- Walter Lure Live in Berlin (2008, Nicotine Records/Tornado Ride Records)
- Spilt Milk - The Last Ditches (2016, self-produced)
- L.A.M.F. Live at The Bowery Electric (2017 Jungle Records - FREUDLP124)
- Live in Tokyo (L.A.M.F With Mick Rossi - Slaughter And The Dogs) (2020 Secret Records)
- Rent Party - The Waldos (Walter Lure, Joey Pinter, Tony Coiro, Jeff West) (1994, Sympathy For The Record Industry)
