= Johnny Thunders =

American guitarist and singer (1952–1991)

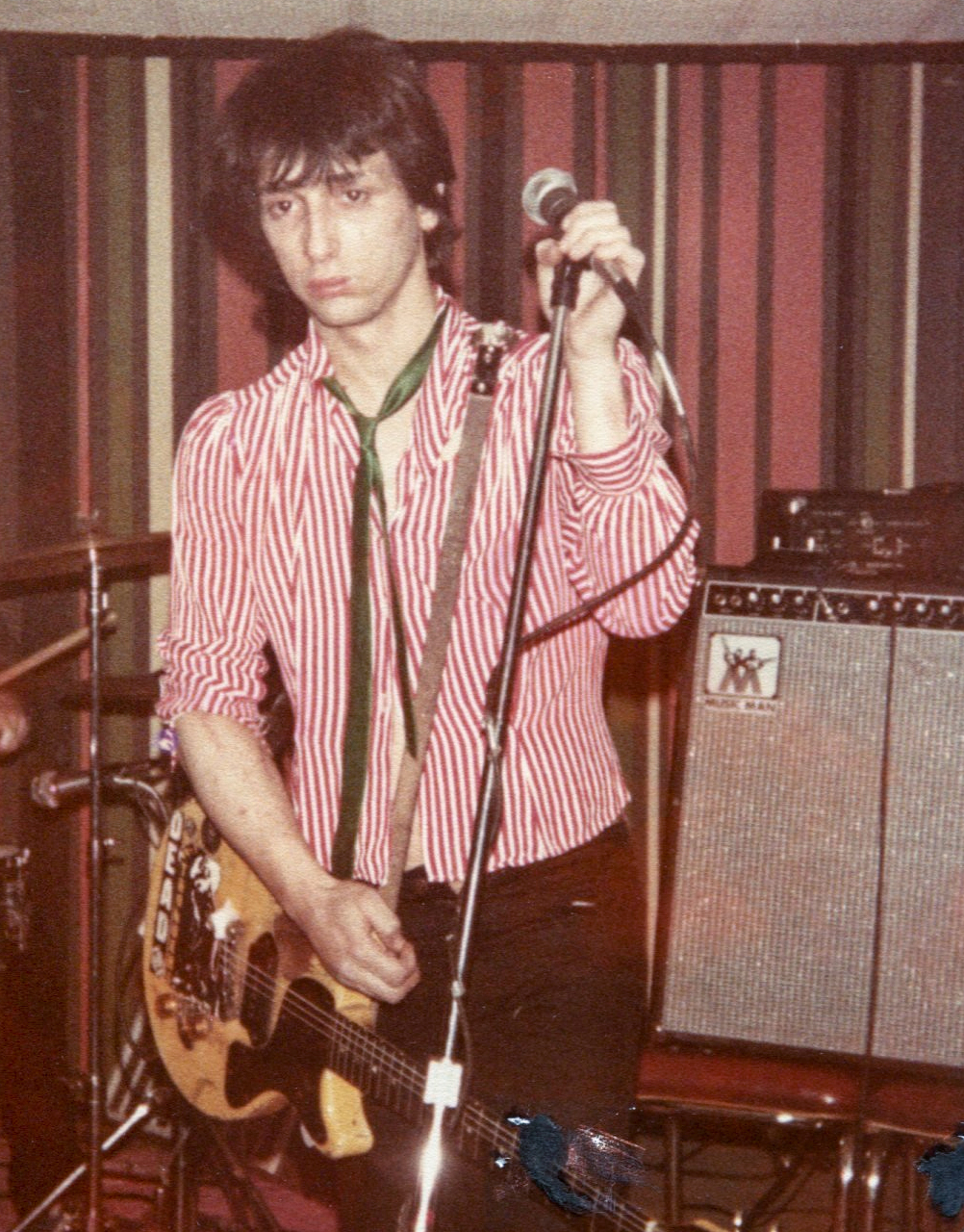
- Thunders performing at the VFW Post in Ann Arbor, Michigan, in July 1979. He was then collaborating with Wayne Kramer of MC5, as Gang War.

Background information
- Born: John Anthony Genzale; July 15, 1952; Queens, New York, U.S.
- Died: April 23, 1991 (aged 38) New Orleans, Louisiana, U.S.
- Genres: Rock; punk rock; glam rock; glam punk; proto-punk
- Occupations: Musician; singer; songwriter
- Instruments: Guitar; vocals; bass
- Years active: 1967–1991
- Formerly of: New York Dolls; The Heartbreakers

John Anthony Genzale (July 15, 1952 – April 23, 1991), known professionally as Johnny Thunders, was an American guitarist, singer, and songwriter. He came to prominence in the early 1970s as a member of New York Dolls. He later formed the Heartbreakers and played as a solo artist.

== Early life and career ==
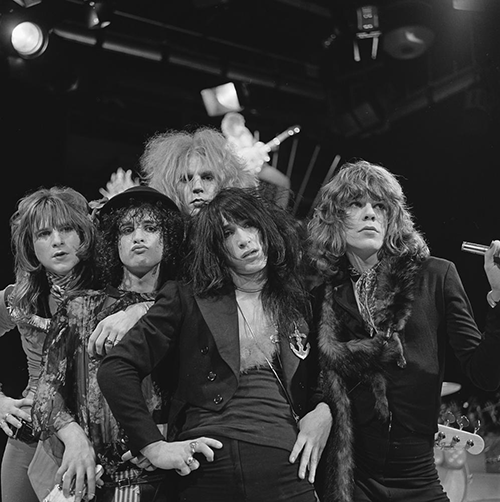
Johnny Thunders (front center) with the rest of the New York Dolls on the TopPop television program, Netherlands, 1973

Thunders was born John Anthony Genzale in Queens, New York, the second child of Josephine Genzale (née Nicoletti, 1923–1999) and Emil Genzale (1923–1982), both of Italian descent (Neapolitan/Sicilian). Thunders had an older sister, Mariann (1946–2009).

Thunders primarily grew up with his mother and sister. He lived in a one-and-a-half-bedroom apartment in East Elmhurst until he was 13. Eventually, Thunders and his family moved in with Thunder's grandmother in Jackson Heights after her husband died.

At age 14, Thunders dropped out of school and moved out the following year. Thunders would claim he hated school and was not the social type, preferring to spend time in parks.

His first musical performance was in the winter of 1967 with a band called the Reign. Shortly thereafter, he played with Johnny and the Jaywalkers, under the name Johnny Volume, at Quintano's School for Young Professionals, around the corner from Carnegie Hall, on 56th Street near 7th Avenue.

In 1968, he began going to the Fillmore East and Bethesda Fountain in Central Park on weekends. His older sister, Mariann, started styling his hair like Keith Richards. In late 1969, he got a job as a sales clerk at D'Naz leather shop, on Bleecker Street in the West Village, and started trying to put a band together. He and his girlfriend, Janis Cafasso, went to see the Rolling Stones at Madison Square Garden in November 1969, and they appear in the Maysles brothers' film Gimme Shelter (1970).

New York Dolls bass guitarist Arthur "Killer" Kane later wrote about Thunders's guitar sound, as he described arriving outside the rehearsal studio where they were meeting to jam together for the first time: "I heard someone playing a guitar riff that I myself didn't know how to play. It was raunchy, nasty, rough, raw, and untamed. I thought it was truly inspired", adding, "His sound was rich and fat and beautiful, like a voice."

The New York Dolls formed in 1971 with Thunders, Kane, Billy Murcia, Rick Rivets and David Johansen. Rivets was soon replaced by Sylvain Sylvain, and Jerry Nolan joined the band after Murcia died in November 1972. They were signed to Mercury Records with the help of A & R man Paul Nelson. Thunders recorded two albums with the band, New York Dolls (1973) and Too Much Too Soon (1974). They were managed by Marty Thau, and booked by Leber & Krebs. Subsequently, they worked with Malcolm McLaren for several months, later becoming a prototype for the Sex Pistols.

In 1975, Thunders and the band's drummer Nolan left the New York Dolls; Thunders later blamed McLaren for the band's demise. The Dolls' lead singer David Johansen and guitarist Sylvain Sylvain continued playing, along with Peter Jordan, Tony Machine (an ex-assistant agent at Leber & Krebs) and Chris Robison, as the New York Dolls until late 1976.

== The Heartbreakers ==
Thunders formed the Heartbreakers with former New York Dolls drummer Jerry Nolan and former Television bassist Richard Hell. Walter Lure, former guitarist for the New York City punk band the Demons, joined them soon after. After conflict arose between Thunders and Hell, Hell left to form Richard Hell and the Voidoids and was replaced by Billy Rath. With Thunders leading the band, the Heartbreakers toured America before going to the UK to join the Sex Pistols, the Clash and the Damned on the Anarchy Tour. The group stayed in the UK throughout 1977, where their popularity was significantly greater than in the U.S., particularly among punk bands.

While in the UK, they were signed to Track Records and released their only official studio album, L.A.M.F. (1977), an abbreviation for "Like A Mother Fucker". L.A.M.F. was received positively by critics, but was criticised for its poor production. Displeased with the production, the band members individually remixed the record, a competition which culminated in drummer Jerry Nolan quitting in November 1977. Shortly thereafter, the Heartbreakers disbanded.

== Solo career, Gang War and Heartbreakers reunions ==
Thunders stayed in London and recorded the first of a number of solo albums, beginning with So Alone in 1978. The drug-fuelled recording sessions featured a core band of Thunders, bassist Phil Lynott, drummer Paul Cook and guitarist Steve Jones, with guest appearances from Chrissie Hynde, Steve Marriott, Walter Lure, Billy Rath and Peter Perrett. The CD version of the album contains four bonus tracks, including the single "Dead or Alive" and a cover of the early Marc Bolan song "The Wizard".

Soon afterwards, Thunders moved back to the US, joining former Heartbreakers Walter Lure, Billy Rath and sometimes Jerry Nolan for gigs at Max's Kansas City venue in New York City. Around this time Thunders played a small number of gigs at London's The Speakeasy Club with a line up including Cook and Jones, Henri Paul on bass and Judy Nylon and Patti Palladin (Snatch) as back up vocalists.

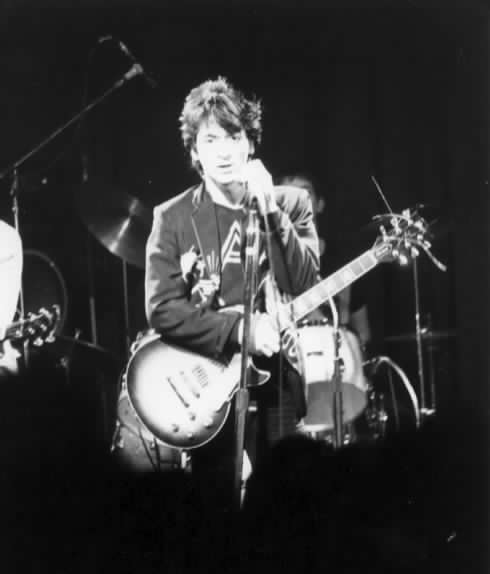
In Ann Arbor, Michigan, c. 1980

In late 1979, Thunders moved to Detroit with his wife Julie and began performing in a band called Gang War. Other members included John Morgan, Ron Cooke, Philippe Marcade and former MC5 guitarist Wayne Kramer. They recorded several demos and performed live several times before disbanding. Zodiac Records released an EP of their demos in 1987. In 1990 they also released a live album titled Gang War, which was credited to Thunders and Kramer.

During the early 1980s, Thunders re-formed the Heartbreakers for various tours; the group recorded their final album, Live at the Lyceum, in 1984. The concert was also filmed and released as a video and later a DVD titled Dead Or Alive.

In the 1980s, Thunders lived in Paris and Stockholm with his wife and daughter. In 1985, he released Que Sera Sera, a collection of new songs with his then band the Black Cats, and "Crawfish", a duet with former Snatch vocalist Patti Palladin. Three years later, he again teamed up with Palladin to release Copy Cats, a covers album. The album, produced by Palladin, featured a wide assortment of musicians to recreate the 1950s and 1960s sound of the originals, including Alexander Balanescu on violin, Bob Andrews on piano, the Only Ones' John Perry and others on guitar, and a horn section.

== Final years ==
From August 1988 until his death in April 1991, Thunders performed alongside backing band the Oddballs with Jamie Heath (saxophone), Alison Gordy (vocals), Chris Musto (drums), Stevie Klasson (guitar) and Jill Wisoff (bass). From April–May 1990, Thunders performed an acoustic tour of the UK and Ireland joining up occasionally with John, Sam and Peter of the Golden Horde, whom he had met and played with previously in 1984 at the TV Club, and were concurrently on tour (of the UK and Ireland) at that time also, for full-band electric performances and TV appearances. On May 8, 1990, recording sessions in London for a joint EP-single cover version with the Golden Horde of "Sugar, Sugar" by the Archies, and original material, had to be cancelled when Thunders experienced health problems following his performances in Wakefield, England, while on tour.

His final recording was a version of "Born To Lose", with German punk rock band Die Toten Hosen, recorded 36 hours before his death in New Orleans.

== Death ==
Rumors surround Thunders's death at the Inn on St. Peter hotel (formerly known as St. Peter Guest House) in New Orleans, Louisiana, on April 23, 1991.

Thunders apparently died of drug-related causes, but it has been speculated that it was the result of foul play. According to his autobiography Lobotomy: Surviving The Ramones, Dee Dee Ramone took a call in New York City the next day from Stevie Klasson, Thunders' rhythm guitar player. Dee Dee said, "They told me that Johnny had gotten mixed up with some bastards ... who ripped him off for his methadone supply. They had given him LSD and then murdered him. He had gotten a pretty large supply of methadone in England, so he could travel and stay away from those creeps – the drug dealers, Thunders imitators, and losers like that."

Singer Willy DeVille, who lived next door to the hotel in which Thunders died, described his death this way:

I don't know how the word got out that I lived next door, but all of a sudden the phone started ringing and ringing. Rolling Stone was calling, the Village Voice called, his family called, and then his guitar player called. I felt bad for all of them. It was a tragic end, and I mean, he went out in a blaze of glory, ha ha ha, so I thought I might as well make it look real good, you know, out of respect, so I just told everybody that when Johnny died he was laying down on the floor with his guitar in his hands. I made that up. When he came out of the St. Peter Guest House, rigor mortis had set in to such an extent that his body was in a U shape. When you're laying on the floor in a fetal position, doubled over – well, when the body bag came out, it was in a U. It was pretty awful.

There is conflicting information about the New Orleans coroner's report.

An article in the Orlando Sentinel states: "[He] died of an overdose of cocaine and methadone, according to the coroner's office in New Orleans. Chief investigator John Gagliano said tests completed last week found substantial amounts of both drugs."

However, other sources state that an autopsy was conducted by the New Orleans coroner, but served only to compound the mystery. According to Thunders's biographer Nina Antonia as posted on the Jungle Records website, the level of drugs found in his system was not fatal. According to the book Rock Bottom: Dark Moments in Music Babylon by Pamela Des Barres, who interviewed Thunders's sister, Mariann Bracken, the autopsy confirmed evidence of advanced leukemia, which would explain the decline in Thunders's appearance in the final year of his life.

In a 1994 Melody Maker interview, Thunders's manager Mick Webster described the family's efforts to get New Orleans police to investigate the matter further: "We keep asking the New Orleans police to re-investigate, but they haven't been particularly friendly. They seemed to think that this was just another junkie who had wandered into town and died. They simply weren't interested."

== Personal life ==
Thunders married Julie Jourden in 1977, and they had three sons, including one from her previous marriage. He also had a daughter by Susanne Blomqvist.

== Discography ==
Johnny Thunders released five studio albums as a solo artist and several live records and compilations.

=== Studio albums ===
- So Alone (1978)
- In Cold Blood (1983)
- Hurt Me (1984)
- Que Sera Sera (1985)
- Copy Cats (1988)

=== Official live albums and compilations ===
- Diary of a Lover (1983)
- The New Too Much Junkie Business (1983)
- Stations of the Cross (1987)
- Bootlegging the Bootleggers (1990)
- Live in Japan (1991)
- Have Faith (1992)
- Saddest Vacation Act. 1 (1993)
- Saddest Vacation Act. 2 (1993)
- Chinese Rocks: The Ultimate Thunders Live Collection (1993)
- Add Water & Stir (1994)
- Stations of the Cross (Revisited) (1994)
- The Studio Bootlegs (1996)
- Belfast Rocks (1997)
- One For The Road (1998)
- Born Too Loose: The Best of Johnny Thunders (1999)
- Live at Leeds (1999)
- Play with Fire (2000)
- Endless Party (2000)
- Panic on the Sunset Strip (2000)
- Live & Wasted: Unplugged 1990 (2001)
- Eve of Destruction (2005)
- Who's Been Talking? (2008)
- Sticks and Stones: The Lost Album (2009)
- The Pipeline (2013)
- Dawn of the Dead: Live at Max's Kansas City (2014)
- I Think I Got This Covered (2016)
- Thunderstorm in Detroit (2018)
- Madrid Memory (2019)
- Live From Zürich 1985 (2020)
- Live In Osaka ‘91 And Detroit ‘80 (2021)

=== Official singles and EPs ===
- "You Can't Put Your Arms Around a Memory" (1978)
- "Dead or Alive" (1978)
- "In Cold Blood" (1983)
- "Hurt Me" (1984)
- "Crawfish" (duet with Patti Palladin; 1985)
- "Short Lives" (1986)
- "Que Sera Sera (Whatever Will Be, Will Be)” (1987)
- "She Wants To Mambo" (duet with Patti Palladin; 1988)
- "Born To Cry" (1988)
- "He Cried" (duet with Patti Palladin; 1988)
- "Baby It's You" (duet with Patti Palladin; 1988)
- "Great Big Kiss" (duet with Shinya Ohe; 1988)
- "Twist And Shout"/"Boys" (featuring Jimi LaLumia & the Psychotic Frogs; 1991)

== Filmography ==
- Story of a Junkie directed by Lech Kowalski 1987
- Mona et moi (1989), directed by Patrick Grandperret, Prix Jean Vigo 1990
- What About Me, directed by Rachel Amodeo, 1993
- Born To Lose – The Last Rock'n'Roll Movie (1999), directed by Lech Kowalski
- Looking For Johnny: The Legend of Johnny Thunders (2014), directed by Danny Garcia
- Room 37 (2019), directed by Vicente and Fernando Cordero

== Bibliography ==
- Antonia, Nina (2000) [1987]. Johnny Thunders: In Cold Blood. London: Cherry Red Books. ISBN 978-1-901447-15-6.
- Larkin, Colin, ed. (1997). The Virgin Encyclopedia of Popular Music (Concise ed.). New York City: Virgin Books. ISBN 1-85227-745-9.
