= Taking Tiger Mountain (By Strategy) =

Studio album by Eno
- Released: November 1974
- Recorded: September 1974
- Studios: Island, London
- Genres: Art rock; art pop; avant-pop; experimental rock
- Length: 48:14
- Label: Island
- Producer: Eno

Eno chronology
Here Come the Warm Jets (1974)	Taking Tiger Mountain (By Strategy) (1974)	Another Green World (1975)

Taking Tiger Mountain (By Strategy) is the second solo studio album by the English musician Brian Eno (mononymously credited as "Eno"), released in November 1974 by Island Records. Unlike his debut album Here Come the Warm Jets, which featured sixteen musicians, this album utilized a core band of five instrumentalists: Eno (keyboards, guitar), Phil Manzanera (guitar), Brian Turrington (bass guitar), Freddie Smith (drums), and Robert Wyatt (percussion), augmented by guest players on some tracks. Manzanera also participated in the writing and production. To help guide the musicians, Eno and Peter Schmidt developed instruction cards called Oblique Strategies to facilitate creativity during the recording process.

Taking Tiger Mountain (By Strategy) is a loose concept album that references themes of geopolitical intrigue ranging from espionage to the Chinese Communist Revolution. It did not chart in the United Kingdom or the United States, but received positive reviews from critics. Since its release, the album has received even more critical attention.

== Production ==
The album was inspired by a series of postcards depicting the Chinese revolutionary opera Taking Tiger Mountain by Strategy. Eno described his understanding of the title as referring to "the dichotomy between the archaic and the progressive. Half Taking Tiger Mountain – that Middle Ages physical feel of storming a military position – and half (By Strategy) – that very, very 20th-century mental concept of a tactical interaction of systems."

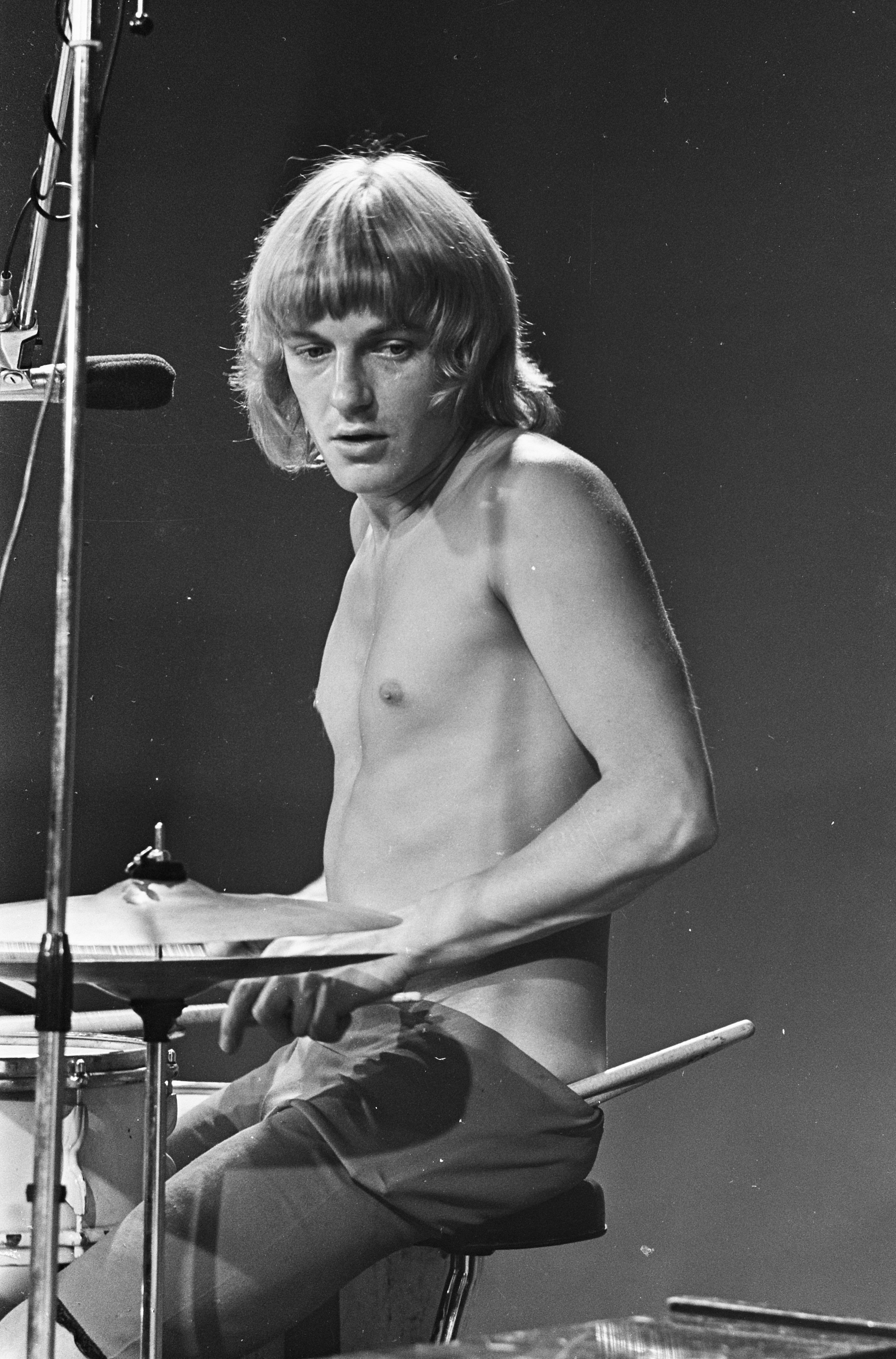
Former Soft Machine drummer and vocalist Robert Wyatt was one of the core contributors to the album.

To further explore the possibilities of the studio setting, Eno and his friend Peter Schmidt developed instruction cards, called Oblique Strategies. During the recording sessions, he would allow the cards to dictate the next unconsidered action in the recording process. Describing the words on the album as an expression of "idiot glee", Eno and Schmidt eventually expanded the Oblique Strategies set to over 100 "worthwhile dilemmas", which would be used in nearly all his future recordings and productions. Schmidt also designed the album cover, which consists of four prints from an edition of fifteen hundred of his unique lithographs, as well as Polaroids of Eno, credited on the album sleeve to Lorenz Zatecky.

Manzanera spoke positively about the recording experience. He described it as:

...just doing anything we felt like doing at the time. The engineer we used, Rhett Davies, also did Diamond Head and 801 Live and Quiet Sun, so it was like family. There was a lot of experimenting and a lot of hours spent with Brian Eno, me, and Rhett in the control room doing all the things that eventually evolved into those cards, the Oblique Strategies, and it was just a lot of fun.

Eno's group on Taking Tiger Mountain included Brian Turrington and Freddie Smith of The Winkies, along with Robert Wyatt and Manzanera. Other musicians appearing on the album include Andy Mackay of Roxy Music, along with the Portsmouth Sinfonia, an orchestra in which Eno had once played clarinet. (The Portsmouth Sinfonia allowed anybody to join as long as they had no experience with the instrument they would play in the orchestra.) Phil Collins plays additional drums on "Mother Whale Eyeless"; after Eno had helped with production on the Genesis album The Lamb Lies Down on Broadway, Genesis frontman Peter Gabriel asked how the band could reciprocate, and Eno requested Collins play drums for him.

== Music and lyrics ==
"Third Uncle"
"Third Uncle" from Taking Tiger Mountain (By Strategy). This song has been referred to as an early predecessor to punk rock.

The sound of Taking Tiger Mountain (By Strategy) has been described as more subdued than Eno's previous solo album, while the lyrics have darker themes and subject matter. The album's lyrics have been described as "remarkably literate and often humorous" with "quick-fire rhymes, oddball couplets, abrupt demands, and ruthless statements". To create the lyrics, Eno sang nonsense syllables to the record's backing tracks and then turned them into words. This lyric-writing method was used for all his more vocal-based recordings of the 1970s.

References to China appear in the album's songs, including "Burning Airlines Give You So Much More", "China My China", and "Taking Tiger Mountain". Steve Huey of AllMusic described the album's themes as "often inscrutable, but still playful – about espionage, the Chinese Communist revolution, and dream associations". On the political theme within the lyrics and album title, Eno explained that he is "not Maoist or anything like that; if anything I'm anti-Maoist". The album addresses several different esoteric topics. "Burning Airlines Give You So Much More" is inspired by a 1974 crash near Paris of a Turkish Airlines DC-10. "The Fat Lady of Limbourg", described by Eno as a "Burroughs-type song", is about an asylum in Limbourg, Belgium, whose residents outnumber the population of the town. "The Great Pretender" describes the rape of a suburban housewife by a crazed machine.

== Release ==
Taking Tiger Mountain (By Strategy) was released in November 1974 in a gatefold sleeve. No singles were released from the album, and it failed to chart in either the United Kingdom or the United States.

The album was reissued by Virgin Records in remastered digipak form in 2004.

== Critical reception ==
Professional ratings
Review scores
Source	Rating
AllMusic	5/5 stars
Blender	5/5 stars
Entertainment Weekly	B+
Mojo	3/5 stars
Pitchfork	8.6/10 (2004); 10/10 (2017)
The Rolling Stone Album Guide	4/5 stars
Select	4/5
Spin Alternative Record Guide	9/10
Uncut	5/5 stars
The Village Voice	A−

Like Here Come the Warm Jets, Taking Tiger Mountain received a mostly positive reception from critics. Writing for The Village Voice, Robert Christgau gave the album a rating of A−. "Every cut on this clear, consistent, elusive album affords distinct present pleasure", he said. "Admittedly, when they're over they're over – you don't flash on them the way you do on 'Cindy Tells Me' and 'Baby's on Fire'. But that's just his way of being modest." Wayne Robbins of Creem lauded Eno for the way he "grafts seemingly disparate elements in any way that might be useful to his flow". Robbins explained, "It sounds like it might be pretentious; it's not, because Eno is comfortable with those pretensions." He concluded that "a man who can write songs like 'Burning Airlines Give You So Much More' has seen the future, and the future is a sonic Disney named Eno, who makes music you can live with". Circus magazine described the album as "Sick! Sick! Sick! But, oh-h-h, it feels so good! [...] guaranteed to be put on the 'Most Wanted' list by psychopaths everywhere [...] [Eno] takes you on a dada-ists tour-de-force, lampooning and integrating every type of music conceivable". Critic Ed Naha, writing in Crawdaddy!, gave the album a negative review, writing "Much of the Wonderlandish magic found on Eno's first LP is lost on this rocky terrain, being replaced by a dull, repetitive aura that is annoying as all hell." In 1975 Taking Tiger Mountain (By Strategy) was voted one of the best albums of the year in the Village Voice's Pazz & Jop critics poll for 1975.

Recent assessments of the album have been mostly positive, with AllMusic and Blender giving the album 5 stars, their highest ratings. AllMusic's Steve Huey compared it to Eno's first album, writing "not quite as enthusiastic as Here Come the Warm Jets, Taking Tiger Mountain is made accessible through Eno's mastery of pop song structure". Douglas Wolk of Blender rated it more highly than Here Come the Warm Jets, calling it "more immediately likeable". Select gave the album a four-out-of-five rating, calling it "excellent". He described the songs "Mother Whale Eyeless," "Put a Straw under Baby," and "Third Uncle" as highlights. Chris Jones of BBC Music called Taking Tiger Mountain (By Strategy) "a work of genius because it didn't know the meaning of repetition" and "merely took Warm Jets and refined it into a smoother lump of oddness."

== Track listing ==
All tracks are written by Brian Eno, except where noted.

Side A
No.	Title	Length
1.	"Burning Airlines Give You So Much More"	3:18
2.	"Back in Judy's Jungle"	5:16
3.	"The Fat Lady of Limbourg"	5:03
4.	"Mother Whale Eyeless"	5:45
5.	"The Great Pretender"	5:11

Side B
No.	Title	Writer(s)	Length
1.	"Third Uncle"	Eno; arranged by Brian Turrington	4:48
2.	"Put a Straw under Baby"		3:25
3.	"The True Wheel"	Eno, Phil Manzanera	5:11
4.	"China My China"		4:44
5.	"Taking Tiger Mountain"		5:32

Note

- Side A of early vinyl copies ends with the sound of chirping crickets locked into the inner groove.

== Personnel ==
- Eno – vocals, electronics, keyboards, snake guitar, treatments
- Phil Manzanera – guitar
- Brian Turrington – bass guitar, piano (track 10)
- Freddie Smith – drums
- Robert Wyatt – percussion, backing vocals

Guest musicians

- The Simplistics – chorus on tracks 2 and 10
- Andy Mackay – brass on track 3
- Phil Collins – additional drums on track 4
- Polly Eltes – vocals on track 4
- Portsmouth Sinfonia – strings on track 7
- Randi and the Pyramids – chorus on track 8

Production

- Brian Eno – production
- Phil Manzanera – production assistance
- Rhett Davies – engineering
- Robert Ash – engineering assistance
- Denny Bridges (AIR)^{?} – audio engineering
- Jon Walls (AIR)^{?} – engineering assistance
- Nicholas Pearson – special aide
- Bill Kelsey – special equipment
- Simon Heyworth – mastering
- David Hill – Ampex ATR 2Ch Tape playback with ARIA electronics
- John Bonis – typography, lettering
- Peter Schmidt – cover art
