= Random Hold =

British rock band

Random Hold were a British rock band, originally active between 1977 and 1980, with a reformed band under the same name active between 1981 and 1982.

== History ==
The first line-up featured David Ferguson (keyboards) and David Rhodes (guitar and vocals), plus Simon Ainley (guitars and vocals), Bill MacCormick (bass) and David Leach (drums). After a handful of gigs and record label interest, the band signed to Polydor Records.

In late 1976, Dulwich College schoolmates David Ferguson (keyboards) and David Rhodes (guitar) formed a musical unit together, after attending a gig by the band 801, featuring Phil Manzanera (also a Dulwich College alumnus) and Brian Eno. The two Davids felt that 801 was too mainstream, underused the talents of its members, and that they could do better themselves. The duet initially bore the name "Manscheinen", playing in an experimental/electronic genre.

Another Dulwich alumnus, Simon Ainley (Eric Smith Explosion, 801), joined on guitar in April 1978, and then in August, so did another, Bill MacCormick on bass. MacCormick had a substantial musical pedigree, having played extensively with Quiet Sun, Matching Mole and 801. Their first drummer, the future business guru Andrew "Ernie" Wileman, formerly of Travelling Band, Pussy, The Storm in a Teacup Band, and Rothko (all bands well known on the legendary Dulwich and Lordship Lane circuit), left due to musical differences. After trying various replacement drummers and conducting endless auditions the band finally recruited David Leach.

The five piece line-up produced a very dark, post-punk sound, with vocal duties shared between the members. Their first major exposure in the music press was not to come until a December 1978 interview, and article by Allan Jones, in Melody Maker magazine. Increasingly frantic negotiations with many companies led to the band signing to Polydor Records for recording purposes on 19 March 1979. Separate contracts were made over the next two months for publishing with Tony Stratton Smith's Hit and Run Music and for management with Gail Colson of Gailforce. After some exploration of the possibility of working with Peter Gabriel, Colson arranged for recording of Random Hold's first album to start in July 1979, produced by another Gailforce artist, Peter Hammill.

However, the line-up shifted again in June. Leach was replaced, due to medical problems, by Peter Phipps formerly of The Glitter Band. Simon Ainley was sacked, on the grounds that his style was too light and poppy for the band. This change propelled David Rhodes into the lead role. Polydor wanted a single to be released, and the track "Etceteraville" was chosen, and was released in October. Regular, well-reviewed gigs at the Marquee Club, London, and a tour with XTC suggested that better things might have been on the horizon, but the next release, a 5-track EP "Avalanche", sold badly. The full-length album, The View From Here, got some positive reviews when it was released in February 1980, at the beginning of a month-long tour with Peter Gabriel. However, Polydor announced that they were dropping the band, shortly after the end of the tour.

The band continued to operate on their saved advances, were scheduled to tour the US with Gabriel through June and July 1980, and still had their publishing and management companies. A company (Passport Records) was found to distribute an album in the US to coincide with the tour. However, on return to the UK, the two Davids sacked MacCormick for stylistic differences. MacCormick in turn claimed back from Gailforce the money that he had personally invested in the band at the outset, and Random Hold was left penniless and inoperative.

"Melody Maker, 16 August 1980: In last weeks' issue, Random Hold were looking for a new bass player. This week, they're also looking for a new keyboardist, drummer and guitarist. In other words, Random Hold have split up."

Within a few weeks, the band members had started to go their various ways. Rhodes consolidated his position as Peter Gabriel's lead guitarist. Ferguson did revive the Random Hold name for a new band in 1981-2, signed to RCA. That line-up included Pete Phipps (drums), Andy Prince replaced by Nigel Hardy and later Martyn Swain on bass, Steve Wilkin on guitar and Susan Raven on vocals. They released one album, Burn the Buildings.

Ferguson was able to have pressed a few hundred copies of the double album, Avalanche (including all pre-1982 released material). CD releases by Voiceprint in 2001 were The View From Here, compiling the complete pre-1982 releases and some live material, and Over View, archive material documenting the evolution of the band, mainly produced by MacCormick.

== Subsequent activities ==
Rhodes continues as a member of the Peter Gabriel Band. Phipps played the drums for two XTC albums, and he also played for Roger Chapman, Eurythmics, and Mike Rutherford.

MacCormick was in business as a record producer for a while afterwards, he withdrew from music activities later in favour of a political career with the Liberal Democrats. Leach is a television executive. Ainley became a landscape architect.

David Ferguson worked as a composer for film and television scores until his death in 2009.

In 2007, Susan Raven was still writing, recording and performing.

== Discography (incomplete). ==
- Etceteraville (1979); LP
- The View From Here (1980); LP, re-released as double-CD, studio and live (with an announcement of Peter Gabriel)
- Burn The Buildings (1982); LP
- Overview (2001); Collection of both demo and studio work of all RH line-ups 1977–1980; CD

Singles and EPs appeared in different song permutations during the band's lifetime.

Martin H... 12" Single Extended Play Released 1979

Tracks 01 Meat 02 The Ballard 03 Avalanche 04 Film Music 05 Montgomery Cliff
