= Mainstream (Quiet Sun album) =

1975 album by Quiet Sun

Studio album by Quiet Sun
- Released: 1975
- Recorded: January 1975
- Studios: Island Studios, Basing Street, London
- Genres: Canterbury scene, progressive rock
- Length: 39:23
- Label: Island
- Producer: Quiet Sun

Mainstream (CD release)

Studio album by Quiet Sun
- Released: 1997
- Label: Expression Records

Professional ratings
Review scores
Source	Rating
Gnosis	(not rated)
Stephen Yarwood	(favorable)
Melody Maker	(favorable)
Allmusic	3/5 stars

Mainstream is the only album of the UK band Quiet Sun.

The band had originally split up in 1972. Phil Manzanera joined Roxy Music, Bill MacCormick joined Matching Mole, Charles Hayward joined This Heat and Dave Jarrett became a mathematics teacher.

In 1975, Manzanera booked a studio for 26 days to record his first solo album Diamond Head and got Quiet Sun together again to record a studio album from their previously composed material at the same time. The result Mainstream was critically acclaimed and became the New Musical Express' album of the month, apparently Island Records' fourth or fifth biggest seller at the time, close up to Bad Company and Cat Stevens.

Reworked versions of three tracks from Mainstream – "Mummy was an Asteroid, Daddy was a Small Non-Stick Kitchen Utensil" (merged with Manzanera's track from Diamond Head "East of Echo," and rechristened "East of Asteroid"), "Rongwrong," and the intro portion of "Sol Caliente" (which also appeared on Diamond Head as "Lagrima") – were performed by Manzanera's 801 project during 1976 and featured on their acclaimed LP 801 Live.

A CD release of Mainstream was released in 1997 on Manzanera's label, Expression Records.

== Track listings ==
=== Original version ===
1. "Sol Caliente" (Phil Manzanera) – 8:02
2. "Trumpets with Motherhood" (Charles Hayward) – 1:30
3. "Bargain Classics" (Dave Jarrett) – 5:37
4. "R.F.D." (Jarrett) – 3:09
5. "Mummy was an Asteroid, Daddy was a Small Non-Stick Kitchen Utensil" (Bill MacCormick) – 6:09
6. "Trot" (Manzanera) – 5:00
7. "Rongwrong" (Hayward) – 9:39

=== 2011 reissue ===
1. "Sol Caliente" (Phil Manzanera) – 8:02
2. "Trumpets With Motherhood" (Charles Hayward) – 1:30
3. "Bargain Classics" (Dave Jarrett) – 5:37
4. "R.F.D." (Jarrett) – 3:09
5. "Mummy was an Asteroid, Daddy was a Small Non-Stick Kitchen Utensil" (Bill MacCormick) – 6:09
6. "Trot" (Manzanera) – 5:00
7. "Rongwrong" (Hayward) – 9:39
8. "Years of the Quiet Sun" (Original Demo)
9. "Trot" (Original Demo)
10. "R.F.D." (Warner Bros Demo)
11. "R.F.D., Pt. 1" (Mainstream Session)
12. "Talking History"

== Personnel ==
Quiet Sun

- Phil Manzanera – electric and treated 6 and 12 string guitars, Fender Rhodes piano
- Dave Jarrett – Fender Rhodes and Steinway grand pianos, Farfisa and Hammond organs, VCS3
- Bill MacCormick – electric and treated basses, backing vocals
- Charles Hayward – drums, lead vocals, percussion, keyboards

Additional personnel

- Brian Eno – synthesizer, treatments, Oblique Strategies
- Ian MacCormick – backing vocals

Technical personnel

- Rhett Davies – engineer
- Robert Ash – assistant engineer
- Nigel Soper – cover art
