= Listen Now =

Studio album by Phil Manzanera/801
- Released: 23 September 1977
- Recorded: December 1975–July 1977
- Studios: Basing Street Studios, London; The Manor, Shipton-on-Cherwell
- Genres: Art rock, progressive rock
- Length: 45:57 (LP); 54:03 (2000 Virgin CD version)
- Labels: Expression, Polydor
- Producer: Phil Manzanera

Phil Manzanera/801 chronology
801 Live (1976)	Listen Now (1977)	801 Manchester (1997)

Listen Now is the only studio album by 801, whose live debut was released in November 1976. For this release, the group was officially billed as "Phil Manzanera/801".

== Background ==
In 1977, hoping to capitalise on the success of 801 Live, a revised version of 801 (now known as Phil Manzanera/801) recorded and released a studio album with additional collaborating musicians including Kevin Godley and Lol Creme of 10cc, and Tim Finn and Eddie Rayner of Split Enz. The album is mainly the work of Phil Manzanera and Bill MacCormick, with contributions from Francis Monkman, Simon Phillips and Eno. Lloyd Watson left the project altogether. Vocal duties were shared by Simon Ainley and MacCormick. Many of the same personnel were to contribute to Manzanera's album of the following year, K-Scope.

The album was first rereleased on CD by EG Records without bonus tracks and in 2000 by Virgin with three tracks previously unavailable. The "Flight 19" b-side "Car Rhumba" was rereleased on the CD version of Phil Manzanera's Diamond Head as "Carhumba". One track, "Rude Awakening", was a leftover from the original session, while the remaining two tracks ("Blue Gray Uniform" and "Remote Control") are demos recorded at PLS studios. "Remote Control" was re-recorded and ended up on Manzanera's 1978 album K-Scope.

== Critical reception ==
The Globe and Mail wrote that "'Flight 19' and 'Initial Speed' are two highlights, the first for its lyrics and the second for Manzanera's quick, fluid guitar work over a charging but light jazz beat."

== Track listing ==
=== 1977 LP track listing ===
==== Side One ====
1. "Listen Now" (Bill MacCormick, Ian MacCormick, Phil Manzanera) - 7:56
2. "Flight 19" (Ian MacCormick, Manzanera) - 5:33
3. "Island" (Manzanera) - 5:20
4. "Law and Order" (Bill MacCormick, Manzanera) - 4:06

==== Side Two ====
1. "¿Que?" (Manzanera) - 1:18
2. "City of Light" (Bill MacCormick, Manzanera) - 7:09
3. "Initial Speed" (Manzanera) - 4:44
4. "Postcard Love" (Bill MacCormick, Manzanera) - 4:34
5. "That Falling Feeling" (Ian MacCormick, Manzanera) - 5:15

=== 2000 Virgin CD version ===
1. "Listen Now" (Bill MacCormick, Ian MacCormick, Phil Manzanera) - 7:57
2. "Flight 19" (Ian MacCormick, Manzanera) - 5:28
3. "Island" (Manzanera) - 5:18
4. "Law and Order" (Bill MacCormick, Manzanera) - 4:07
5. "Rude Awakening" (Manzanera) - 1:10
6. "¿Que?" (Manzanera) - 1:18
7. "City of Light" (Bill MacCormick, Manzanera) - 7:09
8. "Initial Speed" (Manzanera) - 4:44
9. "Postcard Love" (Bill MacCormick, Manzanera) - 4:34
10. "That Falling Feeling" (Ian MacCormick, Manzanera) - 5:15
11. "Blue Gray Uniform" (Peter Wheeler) - 2:54
12. "Remote Control" (Ian MacCormick) - 4:15

== Charts ==
Chart (1978)	Peak position
Australian (Kent Music Report)	91
New Zealand Albums (RMNZ)	30

== Personnel ==
- Phil Manzanera - guitar, acoustic piano, Hammond organ
- Eno - guitar treatment, chorus piano, synthesizer
- Simon Ainley - lead vocals
- Bill MacCormick - bass, vocals
- Ian MacCormick - vocals
- Tim Finn - vocals
- Kevin Godley - vocals, percussion
- Lol Creme - vocals, Gizmo
- Billy Livsey - clavinet, Wurlitzer electric piano, Fender Rhodes electric piano
- Mel Collins - soprano saxophone
- John White - tuba
- Eddie Jobson - acoustic piano, Fender Rhodes electric piano
- Eddie Rayner - acoustic piano
- Francis Monkman - Fender Rhodes electric piano, synthesizer
- Rhett Davies - Hammond organ
- Simon Phillips - drums, percussion
- Dave Mattacks - drums
- Alan Lee - background vocals/chorus

Technical

- Martin Lawrence, Rhett Davies - engineer
- Philip Castle - design, design concept
