= K-Scope =

Studio album by Phil Manzanera
- Released: December 1978
- Recorded: March–May 1978
- Studio: Sun Park Studios, Surrey
- Genre: Rock
- Length: 45:06
- Label: Polydor
- Producer: Phil Manzanera

Phil Manzanera chronology
Diamond Head (1975)	K-Scope (1978)	Primitive Guitars (1982)

K-Scope is the second studio album by Phil Manzanera, released in 1978.

== History ==
K-Scope was released by Polydor Records in December 1978.

The album was re-released in 1991 featuring three bonus tracks. In 2011, American hip hop artists Kanye West and Jay Z sampled the opening guitar riff from "K-Scope" for their song "No Church in the Wild" in their first collaborative album Watch the Throne (2011). In 2015, Manzanera covered their track for his album The Sound of Blue.

== Critical reception ==
The Globe and Mail called the album "more of the subtle rock riches former Roxy Music guitarist Phil Manzanera is noted for," but noted that "new lead vocalist Tim Finn from New Zealand group Split Enz supplies a vocal style too wispy to match the musical elaboration and overall, the record suffers from feeling piecemeal."

DownBeat assigned 4 stars to the album. Reviewer Frank-John Hadley wrote that the album, "pursues Manzanera’s idiosyncratic musical vision; quirky instrumentals stand alongside derisive songs of societal malaise as mirrors of a technologically advanced world. This time around Manzanera’s penchant for hard-nosed, conventional rock comes to the forefront and interacts well with the pervasive weirdness . . ."

Professional ratings
Review scores
Source	Rating
DownBeat	4/5 stars

== Track listing ==
No.	Title	Writer(s)	Length
1.	"K-Scope"	Manzanera	4:32
2.	"Remote Control"	Ian MacCormick	2:37
3.	"Cuban Crisis"	Manzanera, Bill MacCormick	6:02
4.	"Hot Spot"	Manzanera, Ian MacCormick	5:02
5.	"Numbers"	Manzanera, John Wetton	3:29
6.	"Slow Motion TV"	Manzanera, Bill MacCormick, Simon Ainley	3:12
7.	"Gone Flying"	Manzanera, Bill MacCormick	4:27
8.	"N-Shift"	Manzanera	5:33
9.	"Walking Through Heaven's Door"	Manzanera, Bill MacCormick	6:52
10.	"You Are Here"	Manzanera	3:20
Total length:			45:06

== Personnel ==
Many of the same personnel had appeared as part of the 1977 801 album Listen Now.

- Phil Manzanera – Farfisa organ, guitar, keyboards, electric piano, lead vocals, Yamaha CS80 synthesizer
- Simon Phillips – drums, electronic percussion
- Paul Thompson – drums
- Bill MacCormick – bass, drums, backing vocals
- Simon Ainley – lead vocals, rhythm guitar
- Dave Skinner – Yamaha electric piano, keyboards, lead vocals
- Eddie Rayner – keyboards, Moog bass, Yamaha electric piano, upright piano, Yamaha CS80 synthesizer
- Tim Finn – lead vocals
- Neil Finn – backing vocals
- Mel Collins – saxophone
- Lol Creme – Gizmo effects, lead & backing vocals
- Kevin Godley – backing vocals and hi-hat on "Hot Spot"
- John Wetton – bass, lead vocals, percussion, voices
- Francis Monkman – piano on "N-Shift"

Technical

- Gregg Jackman, Melvyn Abrahams – engineer
- Chris Cooper – cover concept

== Charts ==
Chart (1979)	Position
Australia (Kent Music Report)	92
