= Ian MacDonald =

English music critic, journalist and author (1948–2003)

- Born: Ian MacCormick; 3 October 1948; London, England
- Died: 20 August 2003 (aged 54); Wotton-under-Edge, Gloucestershire, England
- Education: Dulwich College; King's College, Cambridge
- Occupations: Music critic; journalist; author
- Years active: 1972−2003
- Notable work: Revolution in the Head; The New Shostakovich
- Relatives: Bill MacCormick (brother)

Ian MacCormick (known by the pseudonym Ian MacDonald; 3 October 1948 – 20 August 2003) was an English music critic, journalist and author, best known for both Revolution in the Head, his critical history of the Beatles which borrowed techniques from art historians, and The New Shostakovich, a study of Russian composer Dmitri Shostakovich. He was also a songwriter, collaborating with his brother Bill MacCormick in the band Quiet Sun.

== Education and career ==
Ian MacDonald was born in London on 3 October 1948. He studied at Dulwich College before briefly attending King's College, Cambridge, at first to study English, then archaeology and anthropology. He dropped out after a year; while at Cambridge, he was distantly acquainted with the singer-songwriter Nick Drake.

From 1972 to 1975 he served as assistant editor at NME. MacDonald began a songwriting collaboration as a lyricist with the band Quiet Sun, which included his brother Bill MacCormick and future Roxy Music guitarist Phil Manzanera. The collaboration resumed in the late 1970s, with MacDonald providing lyrics for the album Listen Now. Later, Brian Eno assisted MacDonald in producing Sub Rosa, an album of his songs released on Manzanera's label.

In his 1994 book Revolution in the Head: The Beatles' Records and the Sixties, MacDonald carefully anatomised each recording by the Beatles, examining the broad themes and sources of inspiration. The book contains detailed song-by-song analysis, but is often subjective and critical. Paul McCartney has stated his dissatisfaction with its accuracy. Access to the original Beatles master tapes was allowed during research. The book also includes his essay "Fabled Foursome, Disappearing Decade", an analysis of the social and cultural changes of the 1960s and their after-effects. The entries about the Beatles' singles that topped the singles chart were released in a separate book in 2002. The edit featured a new, shorter introduction and featured only the essays on the songs on the Beatles' chart-topping album 1.

His book The New Shostakovich (1990) attempted to put the works of the Russian composer in their political and social context, leaning heavily on Solomon Volkov's Testimony. MacDonald's insistence on creating a cinematic scenario for every major piece polarised opinion sharply. In 2006 a heavily revised and updated version undertaken by the British pianist Raymond Clarke, also incorporating some of MacDonald's later writings, addressed some of these issues.

The success of Revolution in the Head motivated MacDonald to resume popular music writing, and he began contributing to Classic CD, Mojo and Uncut music magazines. The People's Music, an anthology of these writings, was published in July 2003 just weeks before his death. He had been working on a book titled Birds, Beasts & Fishes: A Guide to Animal Lore and Symbolism, and another about David Bowie. Neither has been published.

== Death ==
On 20 August 2003, MacDonald died by suicide at his home in Wotton-under-Edge, following a lengthy period of clinical depression; he was 54. The track "Wish You Well" on Phil Manzanera's 2004 album 6PM is a tribute to MacDonald.

== Discography ==
- Quiet Sun, Mainstream (1975) [backing vocals]
- Phil Manzanera, Diamond Head (1975) [bagpipes]
- Phil Manzanera/801, Listen Now (1977) [vocals]

== Publications ==
- The New Shostakovich (1990). ISBN 0-19-284026-6 (reprinted & updated in 2006)
- Revolution in the Head: The Beatles' Records and the Sixties (1994). ISBN 1-84413-828-3
- The People's Music (2003) ISBN 1-844-13093-2
