= Diamond Head (Phil Manzanera album) =

Studio album by Phil Manzanera
- Released: April 1975
- Recorded: December 1974 – January 1975
- Studio: Island Studios (London)
- Genre: Art rock
- Length: 42:28
- Label: Island (original UK issue); Atco (original US issue); Polydor (1977 reissue); E.G.
- Producer: Phil Manzanera

Phil Manzanera chronology
| Diamond Head (1975) | K-Scope (1978) |

Professional ratings
Review scores
| Source | Rating |
|---|---|
| AllMusic | 4.5/5 stars |

Diamond Head is the first studio album by English rock musician Phil Manzanera, his solo debut after coming to prominence as a member of Roxy Music. It was released in 1975, originally on Island Records in the UK (who was handling all E.G. recordings) and in the US on Atco Records. The sound quality on the US edition of album was often deemed worse than the UK album, so the UK import became a popular seller in specialty record shops.

The album features a mix of instrumentals and songs featuring guest vocalists. All members of Roxy Music from the era perform on the album, except for Bryan Ferry. Members of Manzanera's other group Quiet Sun also make appearances, as their debut album Mainstream was recorded contemporaneously at the same studio as Diamond Head.

The diesel locomotive featured on the cover art is an EMD E9.

The English heavy metal band Diamond Head took their name from the album.

== Track listing ==
Side one
| No. | Title | Writer(s) | Lead vocals | Length |
|---|---|---|---|---|
| 1. | "Frontera" | Manzanera, MacCormick, Wyatt | Robert Wyatt | 4:02 |
| 2. | "Diamond Head" | Manzanera | Instrumental | 4:30 |
| 3. | "Big Day" | Manzanera, Eno | Brian Eno | 3:44 |
| 4. | "The Flex" | Manzanera | Instrumental | 3:32 |
| 5. | "Same Time Next Week" | Manzanera, Wetton | John Wetton and Doreen Chanter | 4:45 |

Side two
| No. | Title | Writer(s) | Lead vocals | Length |
|---|---|---|---|---|
| 6. | "Miss Shapiro" | Manzanera, Eno | Brian Eno | 6:40 |
| 7. | "East of Echo" | Manzanera | Instrumental | 5:45 |
| 8. | "Lagrima" | Manzanera | Instrumental | 2:27 |
| 9. | "Alma" | Manzanera, MacCormick | Bill MacCormick | 6:48 |

Bonus track on remastered CD and deluxe edition CD
| No. | Title | Length |
|---|---|---|
| 10. | "Carhumba" (Originally issued as "Car Rhumba" as the B-side to "Flight 19") | 4:48 |

Bonus track on deluxe edition CD
| No. | Title | Length |
|---|---|---|
| 11. | "Corazon y Alma" (Originally issued on the Rare One CD) | 10:24 |

== Track-by-track personnel ==
"Frontera"

- Robert Wyatt – lead vocals, timbales, cabasa, backing vocals
- Brian Eno – backing vocals
- Phil Manzanera – guitars
- John Wetton – bass
- Paul Thompson – drums

"Diamond Head"

- Eddie Jobson – all strings, Fender piano
- Phil Manzanera – guitars
- John Wetton – bass
- Paul Thompson – drums
- Brian Eno – guitar treatments

"Big Day"

- Brian Eno – vocals
- Phil Manzanera – guitars, tiplé, fuzz guitar
- Brian Turrington – bass
- John Wetton – bass
- Paul Thompson – drums

"The Flex"

- Andy Mackay – soprano and alto saxophones
- Phil Manzanera – guitars
- Eddie Jobson – electric clavinet
- John Wetton – bass
- Paul Thompson – drums
- Sonny Akpan – congas

"Same Time Next Week"

- John Wetton – lead vocals, bass, mellotron
- Doreen Chanter – lead vocals
- Andy Mackay – saxophones
- Phil Manzanera – guitars
- Paul Thompson – drums
- Sonny Akpan – congas
- Charles Hayward – tree bells

"Miss Shapiro"

- Brian Eno – vocals, rhythm guitar, piano, handclaps
- Phil Manzanera – guitars, organ, piano, bass, handclaps
- Brian Turrington – bass
- Paul Thompson – drums
- Bill MacCormick – handclaps

"East of Echo"

- Quiet Sun:
  - Bill MacCormick – fuzz bass themes
  - Charles Hayward – percussion
  - Dave Jarret – keyboard themes
- Phil Manzanera – guitars
- Ian MacDonald – bagpipes
- John Wetton – bass
- Paul Thompson – drums, extra drums
- Brian Eno – guitar treatments

"Lagrima"

- Andy Mackay – oboe
- Phil Manzanera – guitar

"Alma"

- Bill MacCormick – vocals
- Phil Manzanera – guitars, organ, tiplé, string synthesizer, vocals, fuzz bass
- Eddie Jobson – synthesizer
- John Wetton – bass
- Paul Thompson – drums

== Personnel ==
- Phil Manzanera — electric 6 and 12 string guitars, tiple, acoustic guitar, synthesized guitar, bass, string synthesizer, organ, piano, vocals
- Robert Wyatt — vocals, timbales, cabasa, background vocals
- Brian Eno — vocals, treatments, rhythm guitar, piano, percussion
- Eddie Jobson — strings, fender piano, electric clavinet, synthesizer
- Dave Jarrett — keyboards
- Andy Mackay — soprano and alto saxophone, oboe
- Ian MacDonald — bagpipes
- John Wetton — bass, vocals, mellotron
- Bill MacCormick — bass, vocals
- Brian Turrington — bass
- Paul Thompson — drums
- Danny Heibs — percussion
- Chyke Madu — percussion
- Sonny Akpan — congas, percussion, bongos, big gong, maracas
- Charles Hayward — percussion
- Doreen Chanter — vocals

Technical

- Rhett Davies — engineer
- Robert Ash — assistant engineer
- Jon Prew — photography
