= Here Come the Warm Jets =

Studio album by Eno
- Released: 8 February 1974
- Recorded: September 1973
- Studios: Majestic, London
- Genres: Art rock; avant-pop; glam rock; experimental pop; art pop; pop rock
- Length: 42:01
- Label: Island
- Producer: Eno

Eno chronology
(No Pussyfooting) (1973)	Here Come the Warm Jets (1974)	Taking Tiger Mountain (By Strategy) (1974)

Here Come the Warm Jets is the debut solo studio album by the English musician Brian Eno (credited as "Eno"), released on Island Records on 8 February 1974. It was recorded and produced by Eno following his departure from Roxy Music, and blends glam and pop stylings with avant-garde approaches. The album features numerous guests, including several of Eno's former Roxy Music bandmates along with members of Hawkwind, Matching Mole, Pink Fairies, Sharks, Sweetfeed, and King Crimson. Eno employed unusual directions and production methods to coax unexpected results from the musicians.

Here Come the Warm Jets peaked at number 26 on the United Kingdom album charts and number 151 on the US Billboard charts, receiving mostly positive reviews. It was re-issued on compact disc in 1990 on Island Records and remastered in 2004 on Virgin Records, and continued to elicit praise.

== Production ==
Here Come the Warm Jets was recorded in twelve days at Majestic Studios in London during September 1973 by recording engineer Derek Chandler. It was mixed at Air and Olympic Studios by Eno and engineer Chris Thomas. The album's title was long thought to be a slang term for urination, but in a 1996 interview with Mojo magazine, Eno said it came from a description he wrote for the treated guitar on the title track; he called it "'warm jet guitar' ... because the guitar sounded like a tuned jet."

Eno enlisted sixteen guest musicians to play on the album, who were invited on the basis that Eno thought they were musically incompatible with each other. He said he "got them together merely because I wanted to see what happens when you combine different identities like that and allow them to compete ... [The situation] is organized with the knowledge that there might be accidents, accidents which will be more interesting than what I had intended".

Eno directed the musicians by using body language and dancing, as well as through verbal suggestion, to influence their playing and the sounds they would emit. He felt at the time that this was a good way to communicate with musicians. The album credits Eno with instruments such as "snake guitar", "simplistic piano" and "electric larynx". These terms were used to describe the sound's character or the means of production used to treat the instruments. After recording the individual tracks, Eno condensed and mixed the instrumentation deeply, resulting in some of the tracks bearing little resemblance to what the musicians recorded during the session.

Eno's girlfriend at the time, potter Carol McNicoll, supervised the design of the cover for the album, which features one of her teapots. The back also has a picture of what appears to be a "naughty" playing card showing a woman urinating outdoors, thus lending support to the original interpretation of the album title.

== Music and lyrics ==
"Needles in the Camel's Eye"
"Needles in the Camel's Eye" from Here Come the Warm Jets. Eno referred to the song as "an instrumental with singing on it".

The songs on Here Come the Warm Jets reference various musical styles from the past and present. The overall style of the album has been described as "glammed-up art-pop", showcasing glam rock's simple yet theatrical crunchy guitar rock and art pop's sonic texture and avant-garde influences. The album has been also described as art rock. Music critic Jim DeRogatis described the sound as "a golden shower of smart psychedelic pop."

On some tracks, Eno's vocals emulate singer Bryan Ferry, of Eno's former band Roxy Music. On other songs they were described as "more nasal and slightly snotty vocals". Musically, the album borrows from popular styles of the music of the 1950s such as the tinkling pianos and falsetto backing vocals on "Cindy Tells Me", and the drum rhythm of "Blank Frank", taken from Bo Diddley's song "Who Do You Love?" Critic Robert Christgau noted that "minimally differentiated variations on the same melody recur and recur," adding that "chances are he meant it that way, as a statement."

To create the lyrics, Eno would later play these backing tracks singing nonsense syllables to himself, then take them and form them into actual words, phrases and meaning. This lyric-writing method was used for all his more vocal-based recordings of the 1970s. The lyrics on Here Come the Warm Jets are macabre with an underlying sense of humour. They are mostly free-associative and have no particular meaning. Exceptions include "The Paw Paw Negro Blowtorch", about the historical A. W. Underwood of Paw Paw, Michigan, with the purported ability to set items ablaze with his breath; according to Eno, the song "celebrates the possibility of a love affair with the man." Eno has attempted to dissuade fans from reading too much into his words; he claims that the song "Needles in the Camel's Eye" was "written in less time than it takes to sing ... I regard [the song] as an instrumental with singing on it".

== Release ==
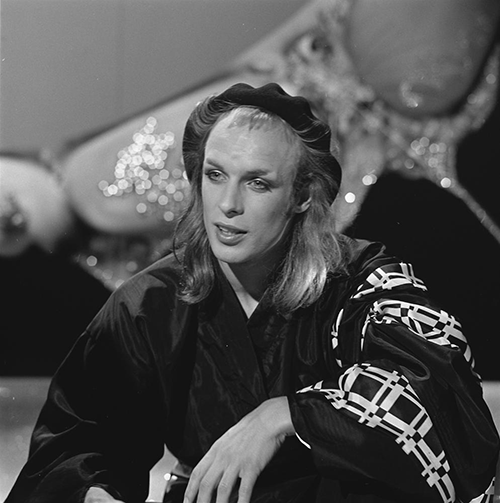
Eno on AVRO's television programme TopPop, April 1974

Here Come the Warm Jets was released on 8 February 1974. The album was one of Brian Eno's best-selling releases, charting for two weeks and peaking at number 26 on the UK Albums Chart on 9 March 1974, and number 151 on the Billboard Top LPs & Tape chart. Eno planned a tour with the band The Winkies to accompany him following the release of Here Come the Warm Jets. Eno had to depart the tour after being diagnosed with a collapsed lung. After recovering, Eno played at an Island Records 1 June 1974 concert with fellow musicians Nico, Kevin Ayers and John Cale.

Here Come the Warm Jets was later re-issued on Polydor in March 1977, and again on compact disc in January 1987. In 2004, Virgin Records began reissuing Eno's albums in batches of four to five. The remastered digipak release of Here Come the Warm Jets was released on 31 May 2004 in the UK and on 1 June 2004 in North America.

== Critical reception ==
Professional ratings
Review scores
Source	Rating
AllMusic	5/5 stars
Blender	4/5 stars
Christgau's Record Guide	A
Entertainment Weekly	B+
Mojo	4/5 stars
Pitchfork	9.2/10 (2004); 9.5/10 (2017)
The Rolling Stone Album Guide	4/5 stars
Select	5/5
Spin Alternative Record Guide	9/10
Uncut	5/5 stars

Initial critical reception for the album was mostly positive, with praise focused on its experimental tendencies. Critic Lester Bangs of Creem declared it "incredible," and noted that "the predominant feel is a strange mating of edgy dread with wild first-time-out exuberance." Robert Christgau of The Village Voice gave it an "A" rating, stating that "The idea of this record—top of the pops from quasi-dadaist British synth wizard—may put you off, but the actuality is quite engaging in a vaguely Velvet Underground kind of way." Billboard wrote a positive review, stating that "... while it all may be a bit unpredictable, and may be a longshot to do much in the U.S. market, it is an excellent LP." The album was also placed in Circus magazine's section for "Picks of the Month". Cynthia Dagnal of Rolling Stone wrote an article on Eno, calling the album "a very compelling experiment in controlled chaos and by his own self-dictated standards a near success." The next month, Gordon Fletcher wrote a negative review for the album in the "Records" section of Rolling Stone, stating "[Eno's] record is annoying because it doesn't do anything ... the listener must kick himself for blowing five bucks on baloney." In 1974, Here Come the Warm Jets was voted one of the best albums of the year in The Village Voice's Pazz & Jop critics poll for that year.

Later assessments of the album have been positive; critic Steve Huey of AllMusic stated that the album "still sounds exciting, forward-looking, and densely detailed, revealing more intricacies with every play". In 1991, Select writer David Cavanagh described it as a "classic" album of "mind-blowing diversity". In 2003, the album placed at number 436 in Rolling Stone's list of the 500 greatest albums of all time, climbing to number 432 in the 2012 update and to number 308 in the 2020 edition. In a retrospective review, Rolling Stone's J. D. Considine commented that "It may be easy to hear both an anticipation of punk and an echo of Roxy Music in the arch clangor of Here Come the Warm Jets, but what shines brightest is the offhand accessibility of the songs", adding that "the melodies linger on ... the album seems almost a blueprint for the pop experiments Bowie (with Eno collaborating) would conduct with Low". In 2004, Pitchfork ranked the album at number 24 on its "Top 100 Albums of the 1970s" list. In 2003, Blender placed the album on its list "500 CDs You Must Own: Alternative Rock", stating that Here Come the Warm Jets "remains his best pop effort. His experimental touch turns basic glam-rock into something sick and sinister. The free-associating, posh-voiced vocals are an acquired taste, but there's method in this madness". The Canadian music magazine Exclaim! referred to Here Come the Warm Jets as "Arguably one of the greatest solo debuts of the 1970s ... Songs such as 'Baby's on Fire', 'Driving Me Backwards' and 'Needles in the Camel's Eye' capture the lush and sleazy underpinning narratives of the British Invasion in arrangements that sound quintessentially timeless". In 2012, Treble named the album in the list "10 Essential Glam Rock Albums."

== Track listing ==
All tracks are written by Brian Eno, except where noted.

Side A
No.	Title	Writer(s)	Length
1.	"Needles in the Camel's Eye"	Eno, Phil Manzanera	3:11
2.	"The Paw Paw Negro Blowtorch"		3:04
3.	"Baby's on Fire"		5:19
4.	"Cindy Tells Me"	Eno, Manzanera	3:25
5.	"Driving Me Backwards"		5:12

Side B
No.	Title	Writer(s)	Length
1.	"On Some Faraway Beach"		4:36
2.	"Blank Frank"	Eno, Robert Fripp	3:37
3.	"Dead Finks Don't Talk"	Eno; arranged by Paul Thompson, Busta Jones, Nick Judd, Eno	4:19
4.	"Some of Them Are Old"		5:11
5.	"Here Come the Warm Jets"		4:04

== Personnel ==
- Brian Eno – vocals, keyboards, synthesizer, snake guitar, electric larynx, treatments, instrumentation, production, mixing
- Chris "Ace" Spedding – guitar on tracks 1 and 2
- Phil Manzanera – guitar on tracks 1, 2 and 4
- Simon King – percussion on tracks 1, 3, 5 to 7 and 10
- Bill MacCormick – bass guitar on tracks 1 and 7
- Marty Simon – percussion on tracks 2, 3 and 4
- Busta Jones – bass guitar on 2, 4, 6 and 8
- Robert Fripp – guitar on 3, 5, and 7
- Paul Rudolph – guitar on tracks 3 and 10, bass guitar on tracks 3, 5 and 10
- John Wetton – bass guitar on tracks 3 and 5
- Nick Judd – keyboards on tracks 4 and 8
- Andy Mackay – keyboards on track 6, saxophones and keyboard on track 9
- Sweetfeed – backing vocals on tracks 6 and 7
- Nick Kool & the Koolaids – keyboards on track 7. This was a pseudonym invented by Eno to describe his multi-tracking
- Paul Thompson – percussion on track 8
- Lloyd Watson – slide guitar on track 9
- Chris Thomas – extra bass guitar on track 2, mixing

Technical

- Derek Chandler – recording engineering
- Denny Bridges – mixing engineering
- Phil Chapman – mixing engineering
- Paul Hardiman – mixing engineering
- Arun Chakraverty – mastering

== Charts ==
Year	Chart	Peak position	Ref.
1974	UK Albums Chart	26	
1974	Billboard Pop Albums	151	

== Sources ==
- Christgau, Robert (1981). "Eno: Here Come the Warm Jets". Christgau's Record Guide: Rock Albums of the Seventies. Ticknor and Fields. ISBN 0-89919-026-X.
- Considine, J. D. (2004). "Brian Eno". In Brackett, Nathan; Hoard, Christian (eds.). The New Rolling Stone Album Guide (4th ed.). Simon & Schuster. ISBN 0-7432-0169-8.
- Eno, Brian; Mills, Russell (1986). More Dark Than Shark. Faber and Faber. ISBN 0-571-13883-7.
- Howard, David N. (2004). Sonic Alchemy: Visionary Music Producers and Their Maverick Recordings. Hal Leonard. ISBN 0-634-05560-7.
- Powers, Ann (1995). "Brian Eno". In Weisbard, Eric; Marks, Craig (eds.). Spin Alternative Record Guide. Vintage Books. ISBN 0-679-75574-8.
- Stonehouse, Ian (2003). "Brian Eno". In Buckley, Peter (ed.). The Rough Guide to Rock. Rough Guides. ISBN 1-84353-105-4.
- Strong, Martin C. (1998). The Great Rock Discography. Giunti. ISBN 88-09-21522-2.
- Tamm, Eric (1995). Brian Eno: His Music and the Vertical Color of Sound. Da Capo Press. ISBN 0-306-80649-5.
- Warwick, Neil; Kutner, Jon; Brown, Tony (2004). The Complete Book of the British Charts: Singles and Albums. Omnibus Press. ISBN 1-84449-058-0.
