= Firebird V11 =

Album by Phil Manzanera

Studio album by Phil Manzanera
- Released: 2008
- Recorded: June 2007
- Studio: Gallery Studio, London
- Genre: Rock, instrumental
- Label: Expression Records
- Producer: Phil Manzanera

Phil Manzanera chronology
50 Minutes Later (2005)	Firebird V11 (2008)	The Sound of Blue (2015)

Firebird V11 is the thirteenth studio album by Phil Manzanera, guitarist of rock band Roxy Music, released in 2008. The album's title refers to the guitar model Firebird VII, made by Gibson, a guitar with which Manzanera has had a long career and that was used on this album.

Manzanera met Polish pianist Leszek Możdżer while working with David Gilmour on his On an Island (2006) album and tour, particularly the final show at the Gdańsk shipyards at which Możdżer played piano.

== Track listing ==
No.	Title	Writer(s)	Length
1.	"Fortunately I Had One With Me"	William MacCormick	4:47
2.	"Cartagena"	Manzanera	6:11
3.	"FIReEBIReD"	Leszek Możdżer	5:57
4.	"Mexican Hat"	Manzanera, Hayward, Możdżer, Stavi	10:42
5.	"Firebird V11"	Manzanera	5:58
6.	"A Few Minutes"	Stavi	7:12
7.	"After Magritte"	Charles Hayward	7:18

== Personnel ==
- Phil Manzanera – Gibson Firebird VII guitar, vocals
- Charles Hayward – Slingerland drums, vocals
- Leszek Możdżer – piano, synthesizers, vocals
- Yaron Stavi – bass guitar, acoustic bass, vocals

Technical

- Jordi Teres, Mark McCarthy, Javier Goyes, Jamie Johnson – engineer
- Lewis Hayward – photography
