= 801 Live =

Live album by 801
- Released: November 1976 (UK); March 1978 (North America)
- Recorded: 3 September 1976
- Venues: Queen Elizabeth Hall, London
- Genres: Experimental rock, art rock, progressive rock
- Length: 46:26 (LP); 56:59 (1999 Reissue); 114:13 (Live Collectors Edition)
- Labels: Island, Polydor, Expression
- Producer: 801

801 chronology
801 Live (1976)	Listen Now (1977)

Professional ratings
Review scores
Source	Rating
AllMusic	4.5/5 stars

801 Live is the first live album by 801. It was originally released by Island Records in the UK (cat. no. ILPS 9444) in November 1976. It was subsequently released by Polydor Records in North America (cat. no PD-1-6148) in March 1978.

In 1976, while guitarist Phil Manzanera's band Roxy Music was on hiatus, 801 got together as a temporary project and began rehearsing at Island Studios, Hammersmith, about three weeks before their first concert.

801 performed three concerts: in Norfolk, at the Reading Festival, and on 3 September at London's Queen Elizabeth Hall. The final concert was recorded and released as the album 801 Live. The music consisted of selections from albums by Phil Manzanera, Brian Eno and Quiet Sun, plus covers of The Beatles' "Tomorrow Never Knows" and The Kinks' "You Really Got Me".

Released at the height of the punk rock revolution in the UK, the LP was not a major commercial success, but it sold well internationally, particularly in Australia, where it was heavily promoted by the ABC's new 24-hour rock station Double Jay (2JJ), and because it gained rave reviews from critics both for the superb performances by the musicians and for its groundbreaking sound quality.

In 2006, the official Phil Manzanera Web site Manzanera.com reported that 801 Live was soon to be reissued as a double CD with "minor tweaks" to the original recordings and restoration of the "proper ending" to the song "Third Uncle". In April 2011, Burning Shed announced the availability of the double CD under the title 801 Live Collectors Edition. Material for the second CD was taken from a 23 August 1976 studio rehearsal on a sound stage at Shepperton Film Studios.

== Track listing ==
=== 1976 LP track listing ===
==== Side One ====
1. "Lagrima" (Phil Manzanera) – 2:34
2. "TNK (Tomorrow Never Knows)" (John Lennon, Paul McCartney) – 6:14
3. "East of Asteroid" (Manzanera, Bill MacCormick) – 4:58
4. "Rongwrong" (Charles Hayward) – 5:10
5. "Sombre Reptiles" (Brian Eno) – 3:14

==== Side Two ====
1. "Baby's on Fire" (Eno) – 5:02
2. "Diamond Head" (Manzanera) – 6:21
3. "Miss Shapiro" (Manzanera, Eno) – 4:20
4. "You Really Got Me" (Ray Davies) – 3:23
5. "Third Uncle" (Eno) – 5:14

=== 1999 Reissue (Collectors Edition) ===
1. "Lagrima" (Manzanera) – 2:33
2. "TNK (Tomorrow Never Knows)" (Lennon, McCartney) – 6:15
3. "East of Asteroid" (Manzanera, MacCormick) – 4:56
4. "Rongwrong" (Hayward) – 5:09
5. "Sombre Reptiles" (Eno) – 3:12
6. "Golden Hours" (Eno) – 4:30
7. "Fat Lady of Limbourg" (Eno) – 6:02
8. "Baby's on Fire" (Eno) – 5:02
9. "Diamond Head" (Manzanera) – 6:21
10. "Miss Shapiro" (Manzanera, Eno) – 4:21
11. "You Really Got Me" (Davies) – 3:22
12. "Third Uncle" (Eno) – 5:15

=== 2009 Collectors Edition ===
==== Disc one: 3 September 1976 Queen Elizabeth Hall performance ====
1. "Lagrima" (Manzanera) – 2:19
2. "TNK (Tomorrow Never Knows)" (Lennon, McCartney) – 6:07
3. "East of Asteroid" (Manzanera, MacCormick) – 4:54
4. "Rongwrong" (Hayward) – 5:02
5. "Sombre Reptiles" (Eno) – 2:52
6. "Golden Hours" (Eno) – 4:33
7. "Fat Lady of Limbourg" (Eno) – 5:51
8. "Baby's on Fire" (Eno) – 4:59
9. "Diamond Head" (Manzanera) – 6:18
10. "Miss Shapiro" (Manzanera, Eno) – 4:18
11. "You Really Got Me" (Ray Davies) – 3:20
12. "Third Uncle" (Eno) – 5:12

==== Disc two: 23 August 1976 Shepperton Studios rehearsal ====
1. "Lagrima" (Manzanera) – 2:16
2. "TNK (Tomorrow Never Knows)" (Lennon, McCartney) – 6:46
3. "East of Asteroid" (Manzanera, MacCormick) – 4:46
4. "Rongwrong" (Hayward) – 5:43
5. "Sombre Reptiles" (Eno) – 3:56
6. "Fat Lady of Limbourg" (Eno) – 9:06
7. "Baby's on Fire" (Eno) – 5:21
8. "Diamond Head" (Manzanera) – 5:39
9. "Miss Shapiro" (Manzanera, Eno) – 3:56
10. "You Really Got Me" (Davies) – 3:02
11. "Third Uncle" (Eno) – 5:36
12. "Lagrima (Reprise)" (Manzanera) – 2:21

== Charts ==
Chart (1976/77)	Peak position
Australian (Kent Music Report)	28

== Personnel ==
- Phil Manzanera – guitar
- Lloyd Watson – slide guitar, vocals
- Francis Monkman – Fender Rhodes piano, clavinet
- Brian Eno – keyboards, vocals, synthesizers, guitar
- Bill MacCormick – bass, vocals
- Simon Phillips – drums, rhythm generator

Technical

- Rhett Davies – engineer
- Chris Michie – sound engineer
- Richard Wallis – photography
