= Matching Mole (album) =

Studio album by Matching Mole
- Released: April 1972
- Recorded: December 1971 – February 1972
- Studios: CBS Studios, London
- Genres: Progressive rock, Canterbury scene
- Length: 40:02
- Label: CBS S 64850
- Producer: Matching Mole

Matching Mole chronology
Matching Mole (1972)	Matching Mole's Little Red Record (1972)

Professional ratings
Review scores
Source	Rating
Allmusic	4.5/5 stars

Matching Mole is the debut album from the English progressive rock/Canterbury scene band Matching Mole released on CBS in 1972.

== Track listing ==
- All Songs Copyright MCPS Music.

Disc 1

1. "O Caroline" (Sinclair, Wyatt) – 5:05
2. "Instant Pussy" (Wyatt) – 2:59
3. "Signed Curtain" (Wyatt) – 3:06
4. "Part of the Dance" (Miller) – 9:16
5. "Instant Kitten" (Wyatt) – 4:58
6. "Dedicated to Hugh, but You Weren't Listening" (Wyatt) – 4:39
7. "Beer as in Braindeer" (Wyatt) – 4:02
8. "Immediate Curtain" (Wyatt) – 5:57

Esoteric Issue ECLEC22311 Bonus Tracks

1. "O Caroline" (Sinclair, Wyatt) – (Single Version) - 3:33
2. "Signed Curtain" (Wyatt) – (Single Edit) - 3:05
3. "Part of the Dance Jam" (Miller) - 20:57

Disc 2

1. "Signed Curtain (Take 2)" (Wyatt) – 5:32
2. "Memories Membrane" (Wyatt) – 11:16 CBS Studio 29/12/71
3. "Part of the Dance (Take 1)" (Miller) – 7:27 CBS Studio 03/01/72
4. "Horse" (Wyatt) – 3:47 CBS Studio 10/01/72
5. "Intermediate Kitten" (Wyatt) – 9:54 BBC Radio One Peel Show January 1972
6. "Marchides/Instant Pussy/Smoke Signal" (MacRae, Wyatt) – 19:36 BBC Radio One Peel Show April 1972

== Personnel ==
=== Matching Mole ===
- Phil Miller – guitar
- David Sinclair – piano, Hammond organ
- Bill MacCormick – bass
- Robert Wyatt – drums, voice, Mellotron, piano (3)

=== Additional musicians ===
- Dave MacRae – electric piano

== Production ==
- Arranged & produced by Matching Mole
- Recorded & engineered by Richard Dodd & Mike Fitzhenry
- Assistant engineer: Phillip Beckwith
