= A. W. Underwood =

American man purported to have pyrokinetic abilities

A. William Underwood (born c. 1855) was a young African American man from Paw Paw, Michigan, purported in his time to have pyrokinetic abilities.

In January 1882, Dr. L. C. Woodman of Paw Paw wrote in the Michigan Medical News of Underwood, whose purported abilities had made him a local celebrity:

I have a singular phenomenon in the shape of a young man living here, that I have studied with much interest, and I am satisfied that his peculiar power demonstrates that electricity is the nerve force beyond dispute. His name is Wm. Underwood, aged 27 years, and his gift is that of generating fire through the medium of his breath, assisted by manipulations with his hands. He will take anybody's handkerchief, and hold it to his mouth, and rub it vigorously with his hands while breathing on it, and immediately it bursts into flames and burns until consumed.

Woodman claimed to have performed comprehensive scientific testing on Mr. Underwood's abilities, proclaiming them a genuine phenomenon. His story became a topic of discussion in many medical and scientific journals of the day, including Scientific American. Skeptics later suggested that Underwood would hide a small piece of phosphorus in his mouth, then spit it out into a handkerchief. The heat from his breath and rubbing his hands together would ignite the phosphorus, which burns in air at about 30 °C (86 °F). Skeptical investigator Joe Nickell has written that Underwood may have used a "chemical-combustion technique, and still other means. Whatever the exact method—and the phosphorus trick might be the most likely—the possibilities of deception far outweigh any occult powers hinted at by Charles Fort or others."

A century later, the tale of Mr. Underwood was brought to the public eye again as the subject of a 1974 song by musician Brian Eno, entitled "The Paw Paw Negro Blowtorch", from his debut solo album Here Come the Warm Jets.
