= 801 (band) =

English experimental rock band (1976–1977)

- Also known as: Eight Zero One
- Origin: London, England
- Genres: Experimental rock, art rock, progressive rock
- Years active: 1976–1977
- Labels: Island; Polydor; Expression
- Spinoff of: Roxy Music; Matching Mole; Curved Air
- Past members: Phil Manzanera; Bill MacCormick; Brian Eno; Simon Phillips; Lloyd Watson; Francis Monkman; Paul Thompson; Dave Skinner; Simon Ainley

801 were an English experimental rock supergroup originally formed in London in 1976 for three live concerts by Phil Manzanera (guitars, ex-Roxy Music, Quiet Sun), Brian Eno (keyboards, synthesizers, guitar, vocals and tapes, ex-Roxy Music), Bill MacCormick (bass and vocals, ex-Quiet Sun, Matching Mole), Francis Monkman (Fender Rhodes piano and clavinet, ex-Curved Air), Simon Phillips (drums and rhythm generator, later playing with Judas Priest, Mike Oldfield, as well as Toto) and Lloyd Watson (slide-guitar and vocals).

== History ==
In 1976, while Roxy Music had temporarily disbanded, 801 (also referred to as The 801) got together as a temporary project, and began rehearsing at Island Studios, Hammersmith, about three weeks before their first gig. The name of the band was taken from the Eno song "The True Wheel", which appears on his 1974 solo album Taking Tiger Mountain (By Strategy). The refrain of the song — "We are the 801, we are the central shaft" — reportedly came to him in a dream (although it has also been noted that "Eight Nought One" acrostically spells his name).

801 performed three critically highly acclaimed concerts: in Norfolk, at the Reading Festival and the final concert on 3 September at London's Queen Elizabeth Hall. This last concert was recorded live and released as the album 801 Live. The music consisted of more or less mutated selections from albums by Manzanera, Eno, and Quiet Sun, plus a full-scale rearrangement of Lennon-McCartney's "Tomorrow Never Knows" and an off-the-wall excursion into The Kinks' 1964 hit "You Really Got Me".

Released at the height of the punk rock revolution in the UK, the LP sold well throughout the world, particularly because it gained rave reviews from critics both for the superb performances by the musicians and for its groundbreaking sound quality.

Although live albums were by then becoming increasingly sophisticated in their production, thanks to the advent of portable multi-track recorders and mobile studios, most were hampered by relatively poor sound quality. Up until this time, the standard procedure for both front-of-house mixing and live recording was to capture the sound of amplified instruments, such as guitars, by placing microphones in front of the amplifiers. Although many superb performances were captured, the results were still markedly inferior to studio recordings, and live recordings often suffered from a range of problems such as distortion, noise, sound "leakage" between instruments, poor separation and intrusive audience sounds.

801 Live set new standards for live recordings because it was one of the first live LPs in which all outputs from the vocal microphones, guitar amps and other instruments (except the drums) were fed directly to the mobile studio mixing desk, rather than being recorded via microphones and/or signals fed out the front-of-house PA mixer. This so-called "Direct Injection" (DI) method had been used for years in the studio, but this was one of the first instances of the method being successfully used to record a live album.

801 Live became a significant cult success in many countries, notably in Australia, where it was heavily promoted by the ABC's new 24-hour rock station Double Jay (2JJ), which had opened in January 1975. Although based in Sydney, the station could be heard widely around New South Wales and was relayed nationally after midnight via the ABC's national AM network. It is notable that 801 Live received virtually no commercial radio airplay, it had no music video to promote it, and it was originally not even locally released in Australia. Despite this, the album became the highest-selling import album of the year in Australia in 1976, and demand for it as an import item eventually forced the Australian distributors to release it locally.

In 1977, hoping to capitalise on the success of 801 Live, a revised line-up of the band (now officially billed as "Phil Manzanera/801") recorded and released Listen Now. This was a studio album with additional collaborating musicians including Tim Finn of Split Enz, but without Lloyd Watson.

In late 1977, 801 reformed as another live group around Manzanera and MacCormick for a promotion tour for the album, Listen Now. Their concert at Manchester University was finally released as the album 801 Manchester in 1997.

== Members ==
- Phil Manzanera – lead guitar (1976-77)
- Bill MacCormick – bass guitar, lead vocals (1976-77)
- Brian Eno – keyboards, lead vocals, occasional guitar (1976)
- Lloyd Watson – slide guitar, lead vocals (1976; died 2019)
- Simon Phillips – drums, percussion (1976)
- Francis Monkman – piano (1976; died 2023)
- Paul Thompson - drums (1977)
- Dave Skinner - keyboards (1977)
- Simon Ainley - guitar, vocals (1977)

== Discography ==
=== Studio album (officially billed as by "Phil Manzanera/801") ===
- Listen Now (1977) - AUS #91

=== Live albums ===
- 801 Live (1976) - AUS #28
- 801 Manchester (1997) (recorded 1977)
- 801 Latino (2001) (recorded 1999)
- Live at Hull (2001) (recorded 1977)

== See also ==
- Triple J
