= Phil Manzanera =

English guitarist (born 1951)

Phil Manzanera OBE
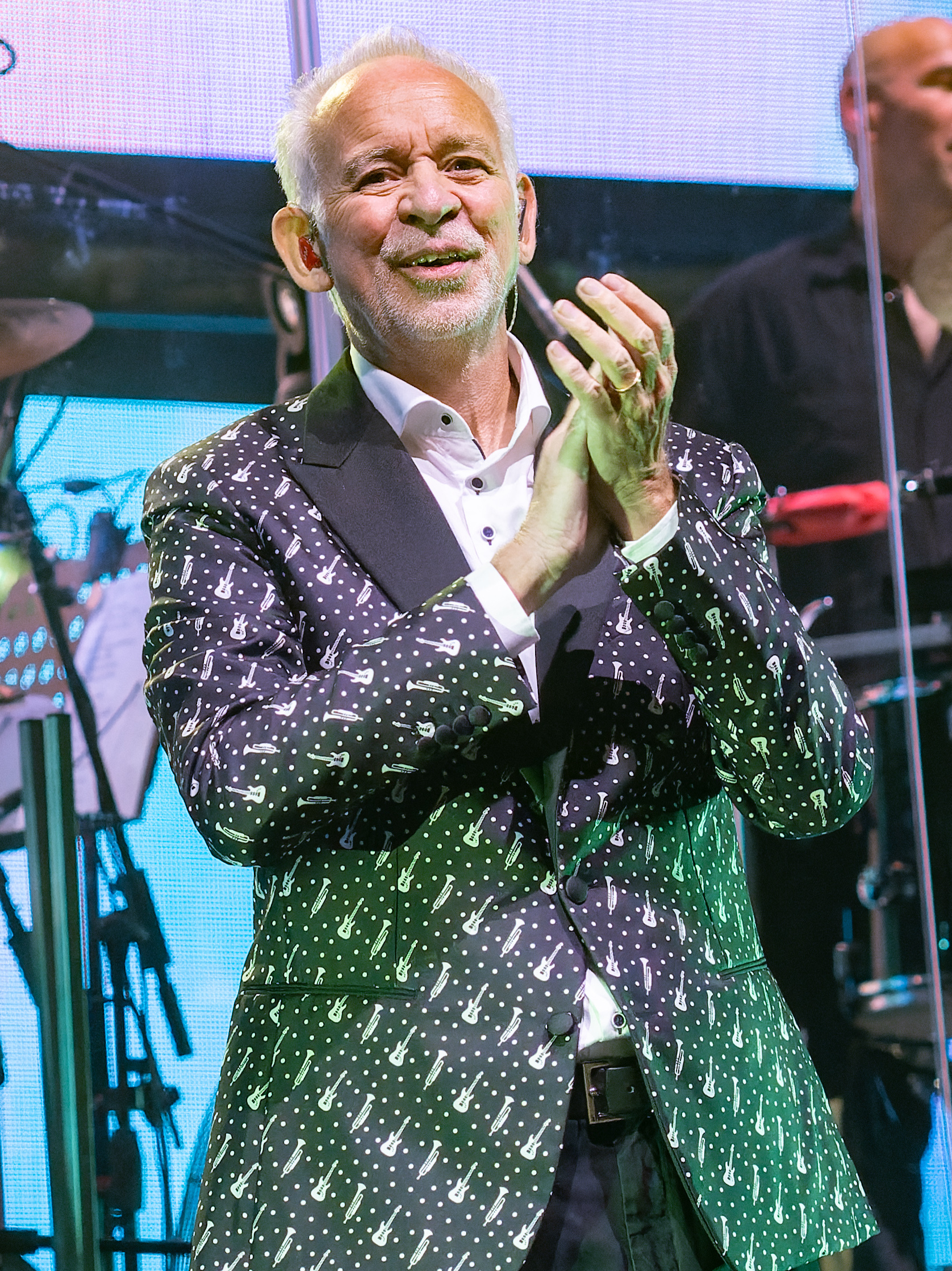
- Manzanera in 2022

Background information
- Born: Philip Geoffrey Targett-Adams; 31 January 1951 (age 75); London, England
- Genres: Art rock; Latin rock; Canterbury Scene; glam rock; experimental rock; jazz fusion; pop rock; art pop
- Occupations: Musician; songwriter; record producer
- Instruments: Guitar; bass; keyboards; vocals
- Years active: 1971–present
- Member of: Roxy Music
- Formerly of: The Explorers; Quiet Sun; 801
- Website: manzanera.com

Phillip Geoffrey Targett-Adams (born 31 January 1951), known professionally as Phil Manzanera, is an English musician, songwriter and record producer. He is the lead guitarist with Roxy Music, and was the lead guitarist with 801 and Quiet Sun. In 2006, Manzanera co-produced David Gilmour's album On an Island, and played in Gilmour's band for tours in Europe and North America.

== Early life ==
Manzanera was born on 31 January 1951 in London, England, to a Colombian mother (née Manzanera) and an English father, who worked for British Overseas Airways Corporation. He spent most of his childhood in different parts of the Americas, including Hawaii, Venezuela, Colombia, and Cuba. It was in Havana, Cuba, living under Batista, that the young Manzanera, aged six, encountered his first guitar, a Spanish guitar owned by his mother. His earliest musical accomplishments were Cuban folk songs inspired by the Cuban Revolution.

In Venezuela, the eight-year-old Manzanera started experimenting with the sounds of the electric guitar. During his teenage years he was absorbing the twin influences of 1960s rock and roll and Latin American rhythms of merengue, cumbia, and particularly the boleros of the Mexican Armando Manzanero.

In his late teens Manzanera – then a boarder at Dulwich College in south east London, where his brother was also a pupil – formed a series of school bands with his friends Bill MacCormick, later a member of Matching Mole, 801 and Random Hold, MacCormick's brother Ian (better known as music writer Ian MacDonald) and drummer Charles Hayward, later of This Heat and Camberwell Now. Among the younger students at the school who saw the older boys performing in these various bands were Simon Ainley (later in 801), David Ferguson and David Rhodes; Ainley was briefly the lead vocalist for 801 in 1977, and all three were members of the late-1970s progressive group Random Hold; Rhodes subsequently became a long-serving member of Peter Gabriel's backing band.

The final incarnation of Manzanera's Dulwich College bands – a psychedelic outfit dubbed Pooh & the Ostrich Feather – evolved into the progressive rock quartet Quiet Sun with the addition of keyboard player Dave Jarrett. They wrote a number of original songs and instrumental pieces, none of which were recorded until years later, and the band broke up when MacCormick joined Matching Mole, but Manzanera briefly revived the group in 1975 to record a full LP of their original music during the making of his first solo album Diamond Head; later he included two other previously unrecorded Quiet Sun tracks on his 2008 album Firebird V11, which also featured Charles Hayward.

== Music career ==
=== Roxy Music (1971–1983) ===
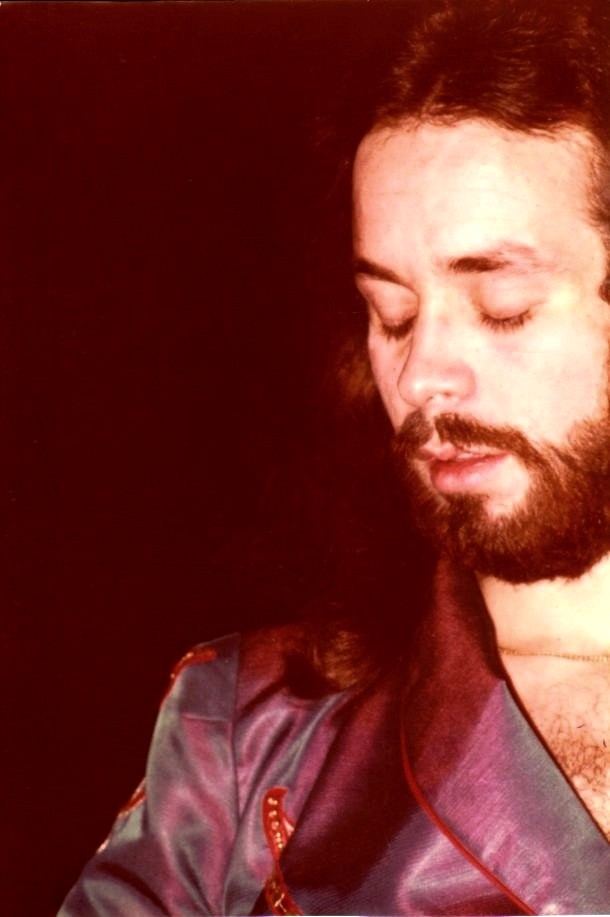
Manzanera in 1973

Manzanera was determined to join a professional band, and in October 1971 he was one of about twenty players who auditioned as lead guitarist for the recently formed art rock band Roxy Music. Manzanera displayed a wide-ranging interest in music. Influenced by his childhood sojourns in Latin America, and his stints at boarding school, he came to know several prominent musicians including Soft Machine's Robert Wyatt and Pink Floyd's David Gilmour, who was a friend of his older brother, Eugene.

Manzanera was not initially hired as a guitarist for Roxy Music, but instead was hired as a roadie/guitar tech. After David O'List left the group in early 1972 (before the group had made any commercially issued recordings), Manzanera was invited to replace O'List as Roxy Music's guitarist. His bandmates at this time were Bryan Ferry, Brian Eno, Paul Thompson, Andy Mackay, and Graham Simpson. Roxy Music's rise was meteoric, with the band being hailed as a major stylistic influence of the early 1970s. During the next 12 years, until 1983 when the band members went on a "long break", Roxy Music released a series of internationally best-selling albums, achieving ten UK Top Ten albums and touring extensively throughout the world. Although Ferry had sole writing credit on the first two LPs, and his work dominated the group's output, Manzanera was credited as co-writer with Ferry on the following Roxy Music songs:

- "Amazona" (Stranded, 1973)
- "Out of the Blue" and "Prairie Rose" (Country Life, 1974)
- "Whirlwind" and "Nightingale" (Siren, 1975),
- "Manifesto", "Still Falls The Rain", "Trash" and "My Little Girl" (Manifesto, 1979)
- "Trash 2" ("Trash" single B-side, 1979)
- "Over You", "No Strange Delight" and "Running Wild" (Flesh & Blood, 1980)
- "Lover" ("Same Old Scene" single B-side, 1980)
- "Take a Chance with Me" (Avalon, 1982)

Manzanera also received sole composer credit on the following Roxy Music song:

- "Hula Kula" ("Street Life" single B-side, 1973)

In parallel with Roxy Music, Manzanera has always pursued solo projects, both recording his own albums and producing for others. His first major credit as producer was in 1975; after spotting the New Zealand group Split Enz, who had supported Roxy Music on their 1974 Australian tour, Manzanera produced the group's second LP, Second Thoughts, which was recorded in London.

Manzanera played guitar on three tracks of the first Brian Eno album Here Come the Warm Jets, as well as providing guitar and production assistance on Eno's second solo album Taking Tiger Mountain (By Strategy).

All his previous solo albums have been digitally remastered and re-released with new artwork on his own label, Expression Records.

=== Solo work and collaborations (1975–2001) ===
As a writer, producer and solo artist, Phil Manzanera has worked with many of the luminaries of modern music, such as Steve Winwood, David Gilmour, John Cale, Godley & Creme, Nico and John Wetton. He has co-written material with many artists, including Brian Eno, Tim Finn, Robert Wyatt and Gilmour. Manzanera co-wrote Pink Floyd's single "One Slip" from their 1987 A Momentary Lapse of Reason album.

Manzanera's first solo album Diamond Head (1975) featured an all-star line-up of session contributors, including most of the former and current members of Roxy Music, except Bryan Ferry. Brian Eno co-wrote and sang on two tracks ("Big Day" and "Miss Shapiro"), Paul Thompson, Eddie Jobson and Andy Mackay all contributed, and Roxy Music's occasional tour bassist John Wetton (ex Family, and then a member of King Crimson) played bass and duetted on vocals (with Doreen Chanter on "Same Time Next Week"). Robert Wyatt co-wrote and sang (in Spanish) on "Frontera", and the members of Manzanera's pre-Roxy Music group Quiet Sun featured on the instrumental tracks. Concurrent with the recording of Diamond Head, Manzanera reunited Quiet Sun (who had not been able to make any professional recordings) and used the studio time to quickly record a full LP of Quiet Sun material, released by EG Records under the title Mainstream.

Reworked versions of two tracks from Mainstream featured on Manzanera's next major collaboration, the critically acclaimed concert recording 801 Live, which was recorded at a 1976 London show performed by the "special occasion" band 801. The group comprised Manzanera, with Eno on vocals, synth and treatments, Quiet Sun bassist Bill MacCormick, Curved Air keyboardist Francis Monkman, 19-year-old drumming prodigy Simon Phillips, and slide guitarist Lloyd Watson, who had previously performed as a solo support act for Roxy Music. The LP featured an eclectic mix of Manzanera, Quiet Sun and Eno originals, alongside distinctive cover versions of two well-known tracks, The Beatles' "Tomorrow Never Knows" and The Kinks' "You Really Got Me". The album also broke new ground in live concert recording, being one of the first live LPs to use the "direct injection" (DI) method of recording, in which the signals from the various electric instruments were fed directly into the recording console, enabling a dramatic improvement in fidelity over the earlier method of placing microphones near the various instrument amplifiers.

The success of the live album led to the creation of a more permanent incarnation of 801, without Lloyd Watson. Manzanera's old schoolmate Simon Ainley (who was later a member of Random Hold with Bill MacCormick) took over from Eno as lead vocalist, who only provided treatments and textures. Francis Monkman, Bill and Ian MacCormick and Simon Phillips became part of an all-star session group that also included Tim Finn and Eddie Rayner of Split Enz (who had by then relocated to the UK), former 10cc members Kevin Godley and Lol Creme, saxophonist Mel Collins, Roxy Music's Eddie Jobson and drummer Dave Mattacks. The 'new' 801 -- officially billed as "Phil Manzanera/801" -- recorded the studio album Listen Now, was released in November 1976, although according to Ainley the initial recordings had begun in December 1975, well before the original concert line-up of 801 was put together. The studio LP was not a commercial success and the group disbanded after a short UK tour. A live performance at Manchester University in Nov. 1977, with Ainley on vocals and guitar, and appearances by special guests Andy Mackay, Kevin Godley and Lol Creme, was recorded on 24-track tape, but the recording remained unreleased until 1997.

Manzanera's second solo album K-Scope (1978) was originally intended to be the second 801 studio album, and indeed it featured many of the same personnel from Listen Now, including Ainley, Bill and Ian MacCormick, John Wetton, Simon Phillips, Mel Collins, Tim and Neil Finn, Eddie Rayner, Godley and Creme, and keyboard player Dave Skinner. According to Ainley, he was slated to perform the lead vocal tracks, and he contributed to the composition of the track "Slow Motion TV", but by his own account he had a severe cold the day he began recording his vocals and could not hit the notes; as a result Manzanera replaced him with Tim Finn, and Ainley contributed only rhythm guitar to a couple of tracks. The LP was eventually released under Manzanera's name, but shortly after it was released Roxy Music reformed, and Manzanera's solo projects were put on hold until the group disbanded again in 1982.

His third solo album Primitive Guitars (1982) marked his tenth anniversary as a professional musician. It was intended as a retrospective of his musical influences and stylistic growth, interpreted through a series of solo pieces that represent various stages in his life – childhood in South America, adolescence in London, his work in Roxy Music and 801, and other projects. Manzanera plays all the instruments, backed only by a drum machine, except for one track that features John Wetton on bass. In between tracks, Manzanera inserted snatches of dialogue recorded at various rehearsals.

In the 1990s, Manzanera performed in concerts all over the world, including at Guitar Legends, the five-day guitar festival in Seville, where he was musical director for the event as well as playing with Bob Dylan, Keith Richards, Jack Bruce, Vicente Amigo, Dave Edmunds, Joe Satriani, Steve Cropper, Aterciopelados, Robert Cray and Richard Thompson. He has also played in Mexico, Argentina, Colombia, Cuba, Spain, France, Italy and the UK, including a ten-date European tour with the Cuban band Grupo Moncada. He played at WOMAD festivals in South Africa, Australia and New Zealand. Manzanera ended the 20th Century by appearing with Bryan Ferry at the British Gas Millennium Concert at Greenwich, the first time they had performed together in 18 years. Manzanera produced the 1993 album Severino from the Brazilian rock band Os Paralamas do Sucesso, which included a participation by Brian May.

=== Roxy Music reunion and later work (2001–present) ===
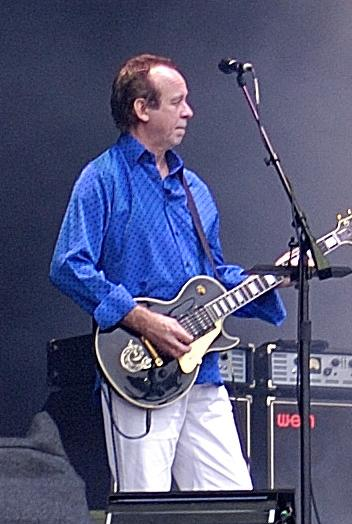
Manzanera during a concert in Munich, 2006

The Roxy Music "long break" came to an end in 2001 with a critically and commercially successful 52-date world tour. In the summer of 2003 Roxy Music played 10 dates in the US, followed by 13 European gigs in 2004, including performing at Live 8 in Berlin. The ongoing reunion went on hiatus after their last performance of 2011, and they would not give another commercial performance for over a decade.

Manzanera had a state-of-the-art studio, Gallery Studios, in West London (now Songphonic Records). The first recording was Robert Wyatt's album Shleep (1996-1997) and the client list included Brian Eno, David Gilmour, Annie Lennox, Kevin Ayers, and Chrissie Hynde. Wyatt's critically acclaimed album Comicopera was recorded at Gallery in 2007.

Manzanera began singing on his own albums with Vozero in 2001, followed by 6pm in 2004 and 50 Minutes Later in 2005. He appeared at The Strat Pack celebration concert at Wembley Arena in 2005, alongside other musicians such as Hank Marvin, Ronnie Wood and David Gilmour. He also worked as a session musician on Eno and David Byrne's 2008 album Everything That Happens Will Happen Today.

Between 2003 and 2008, he collaborated with Colombian artist/sculptor Lucho Brieva in the group Corroncho. The project sprang from a Spanish version of the track Complicada, written by Brieva's wife Chrissie Hynde. The resulting album comprises a set of songs about two corroncho characters ("corroncho" being the pejorative name given by people from Bogotá to fellow Colombians from the Caribbean Coast, particularly Barranquilla). The album includes the musical styles of salsa, cumbia, pop music, ballads, and chill-out and has guest appearances.

Firebird V11 (2008) was another all-instrumental album, recorded with a three-piece backing group that included his old Quiet Sun bandmate Charles Hayward on drums, Polish jazz pianist Leszek Możdżer and bassist Yaron Stavi from the Gilad Atzmon band. It includes two original Quiet Sun tracks, written in 1970, which had never been previously recorded. As the title indicates, the album is a tribute to, and feature for, Manzanera's signature guitar, the red-and-black Gibson Firebird V11 guitar which he has played throughout his career – he can be seen holding the guitar in the "centrefold" photograph on Roxy Music's second album For Your Pleasure in 1972, and a photographically distorted image of it was used on the cover of Primitive Guitars.

In 2011, Jay-Z and Kanye West used a sample of a guitar riff from Manzanera's 1978 solo album K-Scope in a track on their Watch the Throne album. Manzanera was allocated one-third of resulting royalties and publishing revenue for the song. The album went Gold in the UK and Platinum in the US, and the song was used in the film The Great Gatsby and in TV commercials. Manzanera commented in 2024 that he had earned more from "a brief sequence of maybe twenty notes" than he had in his 50 years with Roxy Music.

In 2015, he directed the final concert of the Notte della Taranta Festival, in Salento, Italy.

In March 2024, Manzanera published Revolucion to Roxy, a memoir of his life and his time with Roxy Music.

== Other ==
- Manzanera co-produced David Gilmour's album On an Island. Manzanera also played rhythm guitar on Gilmour's world tour to support the album in 2006 and appears in Gilmour's concert films Remember That Night and Live in Gdańsk.
- He wrote and presented a series of 14 one-hour radio programmes for station Planet Rock entitled The A–Z of Great Guitarists.

== Guitars and sound ==
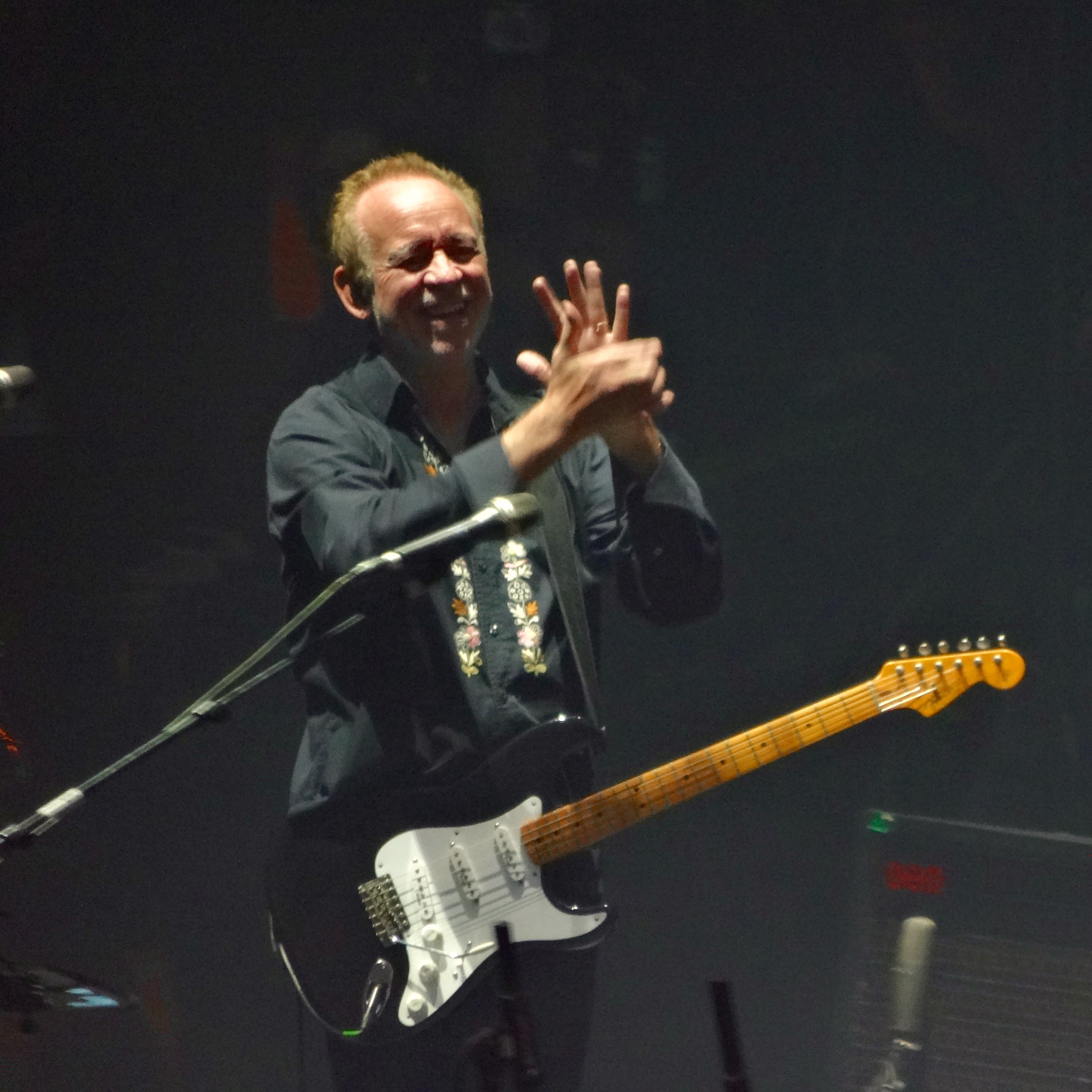
Manzanera with David Gilmour in 2015

Manzanera has played a variety of instruments throughout his career, but he is best known for his "signature" guitar, a 1964 'Cardinal Red' Gibson Firebird VII, with gold-plated pick-ups and tuners. This guitar became widely known to fans after Manzanera posed with it during the photo session that produced the inner gatefold photo for Roxy Music's second album For Your Pleasure in 1972, and he has used it regularly throughout his career. Manzanera also frequently uses two custom-made Gibson Les Paul guitars, one of which (picture above) features a mother of pearl inlay in the shape of an iguana. On tour and in the studio, Manzanera also regularly plays Fender Stratocasters, a Fender Telecaster, and Blade guitars. On the evidence of the cover photographs for the 801 Live album, he also played a Yamaha SG-2000 guitar (as used by Carlos Santana) during the 801 period.

Beginning in the early days of Roxy Music, Manzanera's guitar sound was often heavily treated using various electronic devices and techniques, including processing the output of his guitar through Eno's synthesizers, both in the studio and on stage. This allowed him to create a wide range of sounds and textures, many of which are not immediately identifiable as having been produced by an electric guitar. On his solo album Primitive Guitars, all the sounds on the album except the drum machine and the bass played by John Wetton (on one track) were produced by Manzanera's guitars.

== Personal life ==
In 1977, Manzanera purchased St. Ann's Court, in Chertsey, consisting of a coach house, which Manzanera converted into a recording studio, and a main house, designed in 1936 by the architect Sir Raymond McGrath. The gardens were created by Christopher Tunnard.

The recording studio was used to record Manzanera's solo albums and Roxy Music's Flesh & Blood and Avalon. The main house later featured in the television production Poirot.

Manzanera sold the property to 3Dlabs founder, Osman Kent, in 1997.

== Awards and honours ==
Asteroid 72801 Manzanera, discovered by Marc Buie at Kitt Peak National Observatory in 2001, was named in his honour. The official naming citation was published by the Minor Planet Center on 18 May 2019 (M.P.C. 114955).

In 2024, Manzanera was appointed to the Order of the British Empire in acknowledgment of his services to music. Manzanera's father had also been awarded the same honour, but died before his investiture.

== Discography ==
=== Albums ===
Studio albums

- Diamond Head (1975)
- Listen Now (801) (1977)
- K-Scope (1978)
- Primitive Guitars (1982)
- Southern Cross (1990)
- Vozero (1999)
- 6PM (2004)
- 50 Minutes Later (2005)
- Firebird V11 (2008)
- The Sound of Blue (2015)

Collaboration Studio albums

- Wetton/Manzanera (with John Wetton) (1987)
- Crack the Whip (with Andy Mackay) (1988)
- Up in Smoke (with Andy Mackay) (1989)
- Mato Grosso (with Sérgio Dias) (1990)
- Manzanera and Mackay (with Andy Mackay) (1991)
- Boleros Hoy (with Tania Libertad) (1991)
- Manzanera & Mackay – Roxymphony (2012)
- Nth Entities (with Brit poet Anna Le)(2012)
- Caught by the Heart (with Tim Finn) (2021)
- The Ghost Of Santiago (with Tim Finn) (2022)
- AM/PM (with Andy Mackay) (2023)

Live albums

- Live at the Karl Marx, Havana (with Grupo Moncada) (1992)
- Live at the Curious Arts Festival (2016)

Compilation albums

- Guitarissimo 75–82 (1986)
- The Expression Sampler (2001)
- Rare One (2001)
- The Manzanera Interviews (2001)
- 50 years of Music box set (2025)

=== Other ===
EPs

- Caught by the Heart (EP) (2021)

Appearances

- "Music for French Horn and Drain" (with Andy Mackay) (2023)

=== Bands ===
==== Quiet Sun ====
- Mainstream (1975)

==== The Explorers ====
Studio album

- The Explorers (1985)

Live album

- Live at the Palace (1997)

==== Nowomowa ====
- The Wasted Lands (1988)

==== Corroncho ====
- Corroncho (2010)
- Corroncho 2 (2017)

=== Session work ===
- Here Come the Warm Jets (Eno) (1973)
- Taking Tiger Mountain (By Strategy) (Eno) (1974)
- The End... (Nico) (1974)
- Slow Dazzle (John Cale) (1975)
- Before and After Science (Eno) (1977)
- Freeze Frame (Godley & Creme) (1979)
- Neuromantic (Yukihiro Takahashi) (1981)
- On an Island (David Gilmour) (2006)
- Men Singing (Henry Fool) (2013)
- Half Life (The Eden House) (2013)
- Rattle That Lock (David Gilmour) (2015)
- "Our Path to Freedom" (Radz) (2023)

=== Production ===
- John Cale: Fear (1974)
- Eno: Taking Tiger Mountain (By Strategy) (1974)
- Split Enz: Second Thoughts (1976)
- Heroes del Silencio: "Senderos de Traición" (1990)
- Tania Libertad: "Boleros Hoy" (1991)
- Nina Hagen: Revolution Ballroom (1993)
- Heroes del Silencio: "El Espíritu del Vino" (1993)
- Os Paralamas do Sucesso: Severino (1994)
- Fito Páez: Circo Beat (1994)
- Antonio Vega: Océano de Sol (1994)
- Aterciopelados: La Pipa de la Paz (1996)
- Robi Draco Rosa: "Vagabundo" (1996)
- Enrique Bunbury: "Radical Sonora" (1997)
- Monica Naranjo: "Minage" (2000)
- David Gilmour: On an Island (2006)
- Enrique Bunbury: "Hellville deluxe" (2008)
- The Hall Effect: The Hall Effect (2010)
- Pink Floyd: The Endless River (2014)
- David Gilmour: Rattle That Lock (2015)
