= Pyrokinesis =

Psychic ability allowing a person to create and control fire with the mind

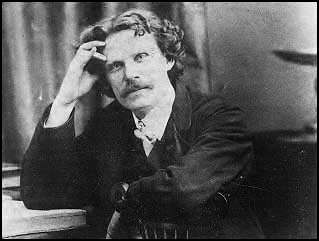
The medium Daniel Dunglas Home was an alleged practitioner of pyrokinesis.

Pyrokinesis is the purported psychic ability allowing a person to create and control fire with the mind. As with other parapsychological phenomena, there is no conclusive evidence in support of the actual existence of pyrokinesis. Many alleged cases are hoaxes and the result of trickery.

== Etymology ==
The word pyrokinesis (from Greek pyr meaning fire, kinesis meaning movement) was popularized by horror novelist Stephen King in his 1980 novel Firestarter to describe the ability to create and control fire with the mind, though its use predates the novel. The word is intended to be parallel to telekinesis, with S. T. Joshi describing it as a "singularly unfortunate coinage" and suggesting that the correct analogy to telekinesis would "not be 'pyrokinesis' but 'telepyrosis' (fire from a distance)".

== History ==
A. W. Underwood, a 19th-century African American, achieved minor celebrity status with the purported ability to set items ablaze. Magicians and scientists have suggested concealed pieces of phosphorus may have instead been responsible. The phosphorus could be readily ignited by breath or rubbing. Skeptical investigator Joe Nickell has written that Underwood may have used a "chemical-combustion technique, and still other means. Whatever the exact method — and the phosphorus trick might be the most likely — the possibilities of deception far outweigh any occult powers hinted at by Charles Fort or others."

The medium Daniel Dunglas Home was known for performing fire feats and handling a heated lump of coal taken from a fire. The magician Henry R. Evans wrote that the coal handling was a juggling trick, performed by Home using a hidden piece of platinum. Hereward Carrington described Evans hypothesis as "certainly ingenious" but pointed out William Crookes, an experienced chemist, was present at a séance whilst Home performed the feat and would have known how to distinguish the difference between coal and platinum. Frank Podmore wrote that most of the fire feats could have easily been performed by conjuring tricks and sleight of hand but hallucination and sense-deception may have explained Crookes' claim about observing flames from Home's fingers.

Joseph McCabe has written that Home's alleged feats of pyrokinesis were weak and unsatisfactory, he noted that they were performed in dark conditions amongst unreliable witnesses. McCabe suggested the coal handling was probably a "piece of asbestos from Home's pocket".

Sometimes claims of pyrokinesis are published in the context of fire ghosts, such as Canneto di Caronia fires and the 1982 Italian case of a young Scottish nanny, Carole Compton.

In March 2011, a three-year-old girl in Antique, a Philippines province with important mysticism and folklore, gained local media attention for the supposed supernatural power to predict or create fires. The town mayor said he witnessed a pillow ignite after the girl said "fire... pillow." Others claimed to have witnessed the girl either predicting or causing fire without any physical contact with the objects. A pastor claimed to have exorcised the girl and police failed to find anything abnormal although a paranormal proponent claimed that she must have inherited those powers from a previous life. The story of the alleged "fire starter" was featured on the June 22, 2020 Kapuso Mo, Jessica Soho show. Since several objects around the house were ignited, local residents flocked to the girl's house to learn of the circumstances and emergency services visited the house to investigate.

There is no scientifically known method for the brain to trigger explosions or fires.

== See also ==
- Fire (classical element)
- Firewalking
- Fire breathing
- Firestarter (novel)
- Pyrokinesis (film)
- Spontaneous human combustion
