= Revolution in the Head: The Beatles' Records and the Sixties =

1994 book by Ian MacDonald

- Cover to the Third Revised Edition (2005)
- Author: Ian MacDonald
- Language: English
- Subject: The Beatles/The 1960s
- Publisher: Fourth Estate (1994, 1997); Pimlico (1995, 1998, 2005)
- Publication date: December 1994; 2 June 2005 (paperback)
- Publication place: United Kingdom
- Pages: 544 (paperback)
- ISBN: 1-84413-828-3
- OCLC: 57750072

Revolution in the Head: The Beatles' Records and the Sixties is a book by British music critic and author Ian MacDonald, discussing the music of the Beatles and the band's relationship to the social and cultural changes of the 1960s. The first edition was published in 1994, with revised editions appearing in 1997 and 2005, the latter following MacDonald's death in 2003.

== Background ==
MacDonald first began working as a journalist with the New Musical Express in the 1970s. He had moved away from popular music writing by the early 1990s with The New Shostakovich, his re-evaluation of the composer Dmitri Shostakovich against earlier KGB written accounts. The success of Revolution in the Head would inspire MacDonald to return to popular music writing for the music magazine Mojo in the late '90s, with many of these reviews and essays eventually collected in The People's Music (2003).

== Format ==
The book's main section comprises entries on every song recorded by the group, in order of first recording date, rather than date of release. Each entry includes a list of the musicians and instruments present on the track, the song's producers and engineers, and the dates of its recording sessions and its first UK and US releases. MacDonald provides musicological and sociological commentary on each song, ranging in length from a single sentence for "Wild Honey Pie" to several pages for tracks such as "I Want to Hold Your Hand", "Tomorrow Never Knows" and "Revolution 1".

The book also contains the essay "Fabled Foursome, Disappearing Decade", MacDonald's analysis of the Beatles' relationship to the social and cultural changes of the 1960s. Later editions of the book added further commentary: the preface to the first revised edition discusses the British art school scene that spawned the Beatles and some of the differences between British and US culture that affect the two nations' respective views of the group; and the second covers subjects such as the Beatles' continued popularity into the 21st century, criticism of their lyrics, and the death of George Harrison. The book concludes with a month-by-month chronology of the 1960s (consisting of a table listing events in the Beatles' career alongside significant events in UK pop music, current affairs and culture), a bibliography, a glossary, a discography, and an index of songs and their keys.

The first edition of the book was published in 1994 and covered every song that had been officially released by the group during their active career between 1962 and 1970. The first revised edition, published in 1997, added tracks that had recently been officially released on Live at the BBC and the Anthology series. A second revised edition incorporated a number of factual updates taken from books including The Beatles Anthology and Barry Miles' Paul McCartney: Many Years from Now; this edition had been prepared by MacDonald, but was published posthumously in 2005.

== Critical response ==
Revolution in the Head drew a favourable response from critics. The Guardian's Richard Williams wrote "no other critic ... contributed more to an enlightened enjoyment of the work of the Beatles." Music journalist John Bergstrom said the book surpassed Mark Lewisohn's earlier Sessions as the de facto factual reference for the group's recording career, adding that it "will leave you scrambling to your Beatles collection for a new listen rather than a familiar or nostalgic one, and that is quite an accomplishment". John Harris described it in 2012 as "a triumph of musical and cultural scholarship ... one of those books that can be reread endlessly."

Stephen Thomas Erlewine highlighted Revolution in the Head as a "massive achievement", "influential" and one of the best books about the Beatles, but decreed that MacDonald is "exacting and not overly generous" with his criticism. Erlewine added: "He's quick to dismiss songs he deems as throwaways, sometimes ascribing emotional attributes to the Beatles that aren't entirely supported by the text." Charles Shaar Murray noted that the book clearly displayed MacDonald's favouritism towards mid-1960s pop, but nevertheless said anyone wanting to disagree "is going to have to argue as cogently and energetically as he does".

By 2007, Paul McCartney had read the book and disputed the accuracy of MacDonald's readings, showing disappointment at personal interpretations of songs being ambiguously treated as canonical. In a 2014 interview, he called it "a good book to just dip into", but felt irritated at the possibility of assertions from the book, "a very highly respected tome", continuing to be propagated as facts.
