= Matching Mole's Little Red Record =

Studio album by Matching Mole
- Released: October 1972
- Recorded: July–August 1972
- Studios: CBS Studios, London
- Genres: Progressive rock, Canterbury scene
- Length: 42:56
- Label: CBS
- Producer: Robert Fripp

Matching Mole chronology
Matching Mole (1972)	Matching Mole's Little Red Record (1972)	BBC Radio 1 Live in Concert (1994)

Professional ratings
Review scores
Source	Rating
Allmusic	3.5/5 stars
Christgau's Record Guide	C+

Matching Mole's Little Red Record (1972) is the second album of the English Canterbury Scene band Matching Mole. The band was formed in 1971 by Robert Wyatt after he left Soft Machine. Compared to their first album, which featured Wyatt's musical compositions, keyboard playing, drumming and vocals, Little Red Record was more of a team effort, with Wyatt only drumming, and singing his lyrics. It was produced by Robert Fripp of King Crimson, and features Brian Eno as a guest musician.

The album title refers to Chairman Mao's Little Red Book (1964). This reference is also carried over to the faux-Chinese style of the album cover, which is reminiscent of posters created during the Chinese Cultural Revolution.

== Track listing ==
1. "Starting in the Middle of the Day We Can Drink Our Politics Away" (MacRae, Wyatt) – 2:31
2. "Marchides" (MacRae) – 8:25
3. "Nan True's Hole" (Miller, Wyatt) – 3:37
4. "Righteous Rhumba" (aka "Lything and Gracing") (Miller, Wyatt) – 2:50
5. "Brandy as in Benj" (MacRae) – 4:24
6. "Gloria Gloom" (MacCormick, Wyatt) – 8:05
7. "God Song" (Miller, Wyatt) – 2:59
8. "Flora Fidgit" (MacCormick) – 3:27
9. "Smoke Signal" (MacRae) – 6:38

For the BGO (Beat Goes On Records) CD edition, Robert Wyatt asked that the album be rearranged so that Side 2 (of the vinyl album) came first as he thought in retrospect that this created a better flow to the album. So it became:

1. "Gloria Gloom" (MacCormick, Wyatt) – 8:05
2. "God Song" (Miller, Wyatt) – 2:59
3. "Flora Fidgit" (MacCormick) – 3:27
4. "Smoke Signal" (MacRae) – 6:38
5. "Starting in the Middle of the Day We Can Drink Our Politics away" (MacRae, Wyatt) – 2:31
6. "Marchides" (MacRae) – 8:25
7. "Nan True's Hole" (Miller, Wyatt) – 3:37
8. "Righteous Rhumba" (aka "Lything and Gracing") (Miller, Wyatt) – 2:50
9. "Brandy as in Benj" (MacRae) – 4:24

The 2013 Sony Music (Japan) Blu-spec CD reissue follows the original LP's running order, and includes the following bonus tracks:
10. "Starting in the Middle of the Day We Can Drink Our Politics Away" (take 1)
11. "Flora Fidgit" (take 8)
12. "Smoke Signal" (take 4)
13. "Mutter" (MacRae)

=== Esoteric Issue 2012 ECLEC 22312 ===
==== Disc 1 ====
1. "Starting in the Middle of the Day We Can Drink Our Politics away" (MacRae, Wyatt) – 2:31
2. "Marchides" (MacRae) – 8:25
3. "Nan True's Hole" (Miller, Wyatt) – 3:37
4. "Righteous Rhumba" (aka "Lything and Gracing") (Miller, Wyatt) – 2:50
5. "Brandy as in Benj" (MacRae) – 4:24
6. "Gloria Gloom" (MacCormick, Wyatt) – 8:05
7. "God Song" (Miller, Wyatt) – 2:59
8. "Flora Fidgit" (MacCormick) – 3:27
9. "Smoke Signal" (MacRae) – 6:38

==== Disc 2 ====
1. "Instant Pussy/Lything and Gracing" (Wyatt, Miller) – 7:56 BBC Radio One In Concert
2. "Marchides" (MacRae) – 10:30 BBC Radio One 'In Concert
3. "Part of the Dance/Brandy as in Benj" (Miller, MacRae) – 4:24 BBC Radio One In Concert
4. "Starting in the Middle of the Day We Can Drink Our Politics away (take 1)" (MacRae, Wyatt) – 2:35
5. "Smoke Signal (take 4)" (MacRae) – 6:44
6. "Flora Fidgit (take 8)" (MacCormick) – 6:38
7. "Mutter" (MacRae) – 3:23
- Tracks 1–1 to 1–9, 2–4 to 2–7 recorded at CBS Studios, London in the Summer of 1972
- Tracks 2–1 to 2–3 recorded at the Paris Theatre, London on 27 July 1972 (BBC Radio One In Concert)

== Personnel ==
- Phil Miller – guitars
- Dave MacRae – Fender Rhodes electric piano, piano, organ and synthesizer
- Bill MacCormick – bass
- Robert Wyatt – drums and vocals

Guests:

- Brian Eno – synthesizer (on "Gloria Gloom")
- Ruby Crystal (pseudonym for Julie Christie) – additional vocals (on "Nan True's Hole")
