= Philip Rambow =

Canadian singer, songwriter, and guitarist

- Born: August 1949 (age 77); Montreal, Canada
- Occupations: Singer, songwriter, guitarist
- Years active: 1970–present

Philip Rambow (born August 1949) is a Canadian singer, songwriter, and guitarist, who fronted The Winkies, had a solo career, and worked with Brian Eno, Mick Ronson, and Kirsty MacColl among others.

== Biography ==
Born in Montreal, he studied at McGill University and started playing in clubs and at student functions, taking his stage name from the 13th century Troubadour of Provence, Raimbaut de Vaqueiras. He formed a band, Missing Links, before moving to New York in 1970, but failed in several attempts to win a recording contract. He moved to London in 1973 after hearing that A&R man Muff Winwood liked one of his tapes. In London, he jammed with pub rock band Ducks Deluxe and met Paul Kennerley, a manager who was putting together a new band, The Winkies. Rambow became the band's lead singer, guitarist, and one of their main songwriters, and the band became well known for their "basic, Stonesy pub rock" performed in "outlandish glam rock stage costumes."

The Winkies came to the attention of Brian Eno, who needed a band with whom to tour after leaving Roxy Music. The tour ended abruptly when Eno suffered a collapsed lung, but resulted in the Winkies winning a contract with Chrysalis Records, who released their self-titled album in 1975. On the day the album was issued, the band split up, and Rambow then returned to New York. He associated with the punk music scene at CBGBs, and formed the Philip Rambow Band. He contributed a track, "Night Out", on the 1977 album Max's Kansas City Vol.2, and a version of "Why Do Lovers Break Each Other's Hearts" on a Phil Spector tribute album, Bionic Gold.

After returning to London at the start of 1977, he formed a band with bassist Dave Cochran and drummer Laurie Jellyman, soon adding singer Maggi Ronson who introduced the band to her brother, Mick Ronson. They recorded some demos with Ronson, which went unreleased, but Rambow won a solo contract with EMI, releasing the album Shooting Gallery in 1979. Through Mick Ronson, Rambow submitted songs to Ellen Foley, who recorded two of them, including the title track, for her 1979 album Night Out. He also co-wrote Kirsty MacColl's 1981 hit "There's a Guy Works Down the Chip Shop Swears He's Elvis", and played on MacColl's album Desperate Character. The same year, Rambow released his second solo album, Jungle Law.

In the 1980s, Rambow worked briefly as a private detective, and then in A&R for Bronze Records. By the early 1990s, he was living in Vancouver, with wife and children, working in publishing and promotion, before returning to Britain to play at a Kirsty MacColl tribute concert following her accidental death. In 2013, he appeared at the RonsonFest tribute event to Mick Ronson in London, and joined an online songwriting group, which in turn to led to him recording the album Whatever Happened To Phil Rambow?, released in 2014. He has subsequently performed with Tony Visconti in the David Bowie tribute band Holy Holy, and played in a trio with former Ducks Deluxe guitarist Martin Belmont.

In 2020, Rambow released a new album, Canadiana, and a compilation, The Rebel Kind: Anthology 1972–2020.

In 2025, Rambow released a new album, I’m An Artist, a universal acclaim album .

== Discography ==
=== Albums ===
- Shooting Gallery (1979)
- Jungle Law (1981)
- Whatever Happened To Phil Rambow? (2014)
- Canadiana (2020)
- I’m An Artist (2025)

=== Compilations ===
- Hope & Anchor Front Row Festival (1978)
- The Rebel Kind: Anthology 1972–2020 (2020)
