= Severino (album) =

Studio album by Os Paralamas do Sucesso
- Released: 1994
- Recorded: December 1993–January/February 1994
- Genre: Pop rock
- Label: EMI
- Producer: Phil Manzanera

Os Paralamas do Sucesso chronology
Os Grãos (1991)	Severino (1994)	Vamo Batê Lata (1995)

Professional ratings
Review scores
Source	Rating
Allmusic	4/5 stars

Severino is the seventh studio album by Brazilian rock band Os Paralamas do Sucesso. It was released in 1994 and produced by famous record producer Phil Manzanera. It was their most experimental album.

The sonority and lyrical themes of Severino were heavily influenced by the popular music and the culture of Northeast Brazil, and the poetry of famous writer João Cabral de Melo Neto (most notably his masterpiece Morte e Vida Severina). However, like the previous album Os Grãos, it received mostly mixed to negative reviews at the time of its release, and suffered from extremely poor sales: it sold only 55,000 copies. However, the album was better received in Argentina.

Severino spawned minor hits such as "El Vampiro Bajo el Sol", "Vamo Batê Lata", "Navegar Impreciso", "Varal", "Go Back" (a Spanish-language cover of Titãs' song of the same name), and "Casi un Segundo" (a Spanish-language translation of the Paralamas' song "Quase um Segundo" from their 1988 album Bora Bora).

Queen guitarist Brian May made a special appearance on this album, providing guitars for the track "El Vampiro Bajo el Sol".

The album's cover was drawn by the famous schizophrenic artist from Northeast Brazil Arthur Bispo do Rosário.

== Track listing ==
All songs written by Herbert Vianna, expect where noted

No.	Title	Lyrics	Length
1.	"Não Me Estrague o Dia" (Don't Ruin My Day)	Bi Ribeiro, Herbert Vianna	2:18
2.	"Navegar Impreciso" (Imprecise Sailing)	Herbert Vianna	3:23
3.	"Varal" (Clothes Line)	Herbert Vianna	3:40
4.	"Réquiem do Pequeno" (The Small One's Requiem)	Herbert Vianna	2:53
5.	"Vamo Batê Lata" (Let's Hit Some Tin Cans)	Herbert Vianna	2:56
6.	"El Vampiro Bajo el Sol" (The Vampire Under the Sun)	Fito Páez, Herbert Vianna	4:14
7.	"Músico" (Musician)	Tom Zé	3:14
8.	"Dos Margaritas" (Two Daisies)	Herbert Vianna	3:06
9.	"O Rio Severino" (The Severino River)	Herbert Vianna	2:54
10.	"Cagaço"	Herbert Vianna	3:38
11.	"O Amor Dorme" (Love Sleeps)	Herbert Vianna	3:09
12.	"Go Back" (Titãs cover)	Sérgio Britto, Torquato Neto (adaptation by Martim Cardoso)	3:05
13.	"Casi un Segundo" (Almost a Second)	Herbert Vianna (adaptation by Martim Cardoso)	5:23

== Personnel ==
Os Paralamas do Sucesso

- Bi Ribeiro – bass
- Herbert Vianna – guitar, vocals
- João Barone – drums, percussion

Additional musicians

- Brian May – guitar in "El Vampiro Bajo el Sol"
- Egberto Gismonti – keyboards in "Casi un Segundo"
- Fito Páez
- Linton Kwesi Johnson
- Reggae Philharmonic Orchestra
- Tom Zé – backing vocals in "Músico"
