= The Winkies =

English pub rock group

- Genre: Pub rock
- Years active: 1973–1975
- Label: Chrysalis
- Past members: Philip Rambow; Michael Desmarais; Guy Humphreys; Brian Turrington

The Winkies were an English pub rock group. The group primarily consisted of Philip Rambow, Michael Desmarais, Guy Humphreys and Brian Turrington.

== Biography ==
The Winkies were formed by Canadian-born Philip Rambow with former Holy Rollers guitarist Guy Humphreys, and the rhythm section of Brian Turrington (bass) and Mike Desmarais (drums). Their music and stage presence were a combination of the sound pub rock and visuals of glam rock clothing.

The Winkies caught the attention of Brian Eno while he was finishing his debut solo album, Here Come the Warm Jets. Eno took The Winkies as his backing band in February 1974, on his first and only solo tour. The outing ended after the sixth date of the schedule in Guildford, after which Eno was rushed to the hospital suffering from a collapsed lung. In March 1974 the John Peel BBC Radio show broadcast four songs performed by Eno and The Winkies: "The Paw Paw Negro Blowtorch", a medley of "Baby's on Fire" and "Totalled" (the latter an early version of "I'll Come Running [To Tie Your Shoe]"), and a cover version of "Fever". Sources differ on whether these performances were recorded during the abbreviated February tour or later, specifically 27 June 1975.

In 1979, The Impossible Recordworks (IMP 1-30) unofficially released the album Floating In Sequence, which contained four songs from the Winkies/Eno February 1974 tour. In 1999, ENO-802 (QCS-1441) unofficially released the limited edition vinyl LP, Brian Peter George St John Le Baptiste De La Salle ENO* – Music For Fans Vol. 2 of the same material. On 23 February 1999, German Records World Productions (LUBEK 001) unofficially released Dali's Car (EAN 4016618288880), containing the same four songs from the Winkies/Eno 1974 tour.

The four songs on all three formats include:

1. "The Paw Paw Negro Blowtorch" – The Winkies
2. "Fever" – The Winkies

~ Recorded: 19 February 1974, BBC Studio Four, London England.

1. "Baby's on Fire" – The Winkies
2. "I'll Come Running" (aka "Totalled") – The Winkies

~ Recorded: 26 February 1974, BBC Studio Four, London England

After touring with Eno, the band signed with Chrysalis Records and recorded various tracks with Leo Lyons of Ten Years After. Guests on these recordings included Chick Churchill and Eno. This intended album was never completed, and the Winkies began work on another set, with Guy Stevens producing. Their debut album, The Winkies, was released in March 1975.

Shortly after the release of this album, the Winkies disbanded.

== Discography ==
Year	Title
1975	The Winkies: Released: March 1975; Label: Chrysalis; Formats: LP
