= Bill MacCormick =

English musician, politician, and author (born 1951)

- Born: William MacCormick; 15 April 1951 (age 75); London, England
- Instruments: Bass; vocals; guitar
- Years active: 1971–1982
- Formerly of: Quiet Sun; 801; Random Hold; Matching Mole

William MacCormick (born 15 April 1951) is an English bassist and vocalist. He is also a politician and author.

== Early life ==
He is the second son of Ewen and Olwen MacCormick who married in 1946 after serving together in the RAF. His older brother, Ian MacCormick (also known as the music journalist and writer Ian MacDonald) was born in 1948. After attending primary schools in Brixton they were both awarded free places at Dulwich College. There MacCormick met Phil Targett-Adams (now better known as Phil Manzanera) and they developed an interest in playing music. In 1966 MacCormick's mother worked with Honor Wyatt, the mother of drummer Robert Wyatt, and MacCormick saw Wyatt's band Soft Machine play their first gig in August 1966 at Coombe Springs in Kingston and, thereafter, became a regular visitor at Honor Wyatt's house in Dalmore Road, West Dulwich, where the band lived and rehearsed. In 1968 Manzanera and MacCormick formed a band at Dulwich College with a floating membership except for drummer Charles Hayward, two years their junior. Under the name Pooh and the Ostrich Feather they played gigs around the school and at parties. MacCormick and Manzanera both left Dulwich College in 1969 and they reunited with Charles Hayward the following year to form a band called Quiet Sun. They recruited keyboard player Dave Jarrett and, briefly, sax player, Dave Monaghan, but were unable to find a suitable bass player. MacCormick, who was to sing and play drums, learnt the bass parts to the various compositions in order for the band to rehearse and continued as the bass player until the band broke up in the summer of 1971.

One of the band's last gigs was supporting Symbiosis at Portsmouth Polytechnic. This band featured Robert Wyatt who was about to leave Soft Machine and, when he did, he contacted MacCormick asking him to play bass in a new band to be called Matching Mole. They were joined in the band by Phil Miller and Caravan's keyboard player Dave Sinclair. They recorded an album for CBS in December 1971 (released simply as Matching Mole in April 1972) and Dave Sinclair was replaced by New Zealand keyboard player Dave MacRae in February 1972. The band toured intermittently until September 1972 when Robert broke it up. It had recorded its second album, Little Red Record, the previous month. MacCormick briefly joined Daevid Allen's Gong in France in the autumn of 1972. In the spring of 1973 he persuaded Robert Wyatt to form a new version of Matching Mole which would also feature sax player Gary Windo and keyboard player Francis Monkman recently of Curved Air. Unfortunately, after a serious accident involving Robert, the project was abandoned. That autumn MacCormick played on two tracks of Brian Eno's first solo album Here Come the Warm Jets.

In 1974 MacCormick decided to pursue his interest in politics and was awarded a place at the London School of Economics to start in September 1975. in the meantime, Manzanera was planning to record his first solo album (Diamond Head) but had booked extra studio time in order to record Quiet Sun's unrecorded material. The original band was reformed and, assisted by Eno and his brother Ian MacDonald, the album Mainstream was recorded. Ian and MacCormick then continued writing and recording with Manzanera over an extended period producing the album Listen Now, released in 1977. In the summer of 1976, Manzanera, MacCormick and Eno along with drummer Simon Phillips, Francis Monkman and slide guitar player Lloyd Watson formed the short-lived 801 which played three gigs and recorded an album 801 Live, released in late 1976.

A new version of the 801 was formed in order tour to promote the release of Listen Now in the autumn of 1977. This consisted of Manzanera, MacCormick, singer/guitarist Simon Ainley, Roxy Music drummer Paul Thompson and keyboard player David Skinner. In early 1978 work started on Manzanera's third solo album, K-Scope, which MacCormick partly wrote and on which he played and sang. Roxy Music then reformed to record Manifesto. Later that year MacCormick was invited to join Random Hold, a band formed by guitarist David Rhodes and keyboard player the late Dave Ferguson. Along with ex-Glitter Band drummer Pete Phipps they toured the UK supporting XTC and Peter Gabriel and in North America with Peter Gabriel. They recorded a double album for Polydor Records. The band broke up in the summer of 1980 and MacCormick left the music business to pursue his interest in politics.

In addition, he played a bass solo on Manzanera's 2004 album 6PM in the track "Wish You Well", a tribute to MacCormick's late brother Ian and was the webmaster of the official Genesis, Phil Collins and Phil Manzanera web sites for several years.

== Politics ==
Having joined the Liberal Party in 1973 and after being a candidate in the 1974 Council elections in the London Borough of Bromley, he was selected to stand as the Greater London Council candidate in Beckenham in 1981 and as a borough council candidate in 1982. In 1982 he was short-listed for the Bermondsey by-election. After Simon Hughes's election as MP he worked in the constituency and was agent in two successful Southwark Council by-elections and was assistant agent in the 1984 General Election. Soon after he was employed as the London Area Agent by the Liberal Party and was agent in the 1984 Enfield Southgate by-election caused when the Conservative MP, Sir Anthony Berry, was murdered by the IRA. At the subsequent Brecon and Radnor by-election in 1985 he organised the first ever computerised direct mail campaign which helped the Liberal Party win the seat. He ran computer operations at numerous by-elections over the next six years including wins in Greenwich, Eastbourne, and Kincardine and Deeside. He was also the agent in the Liberal Democrats' first by-election, in Kensington, in 1988. In 1988 he was appointed one of two National Elections Co-ordinators for the Liberal Democrats alongside Chris (later Lord) Rennard before he left in 1989 after a financial crisis in the new party. He joined a small direct marketing company called PS Mailing but continued to be contracted back to the Liberal Democrats for fundraising and by-elections. Having attended a political conference in Washington DC organised by Campaigns and Elections magazine to learn about polling, the company was commissioned to conduct a telephone poll prior to the Kincardine and Deeside by-election in 1991. This having been successful, and the company taken over by the large independent market research company Martin Hamblin, he helped organise and conduct the Liberal Democrats' research programme through until the end of the General Election in 1997.

In 1998 he retired on health grounds. He had been elected as the London Borough councillor for the Anerley ward of Bromley London Borough Council in 1990 and had retained the seat in 1994 and 1998 but retired in 2002.

== Author ==
In 2006 he published a book entitled Pro Patria Mori: The 56th (1st London) Division at Gommecourt, 1st July 1916. This was planned as the first of a series of books about the Battle of the Somme. Since then he has published A Lack of Offensive Spirit? The 46th (North Midland) Division at Gommecourt, 1 July 1916 and Z Day: The VIII Corps at Beaumont-Hamel and Serre, 1 July 1916. A new book, The Long Road to the Somme 1870–1916, was due in 2018 and published in 2024 along with The Long Road to the Somme: Planning the Big Push: Chantilly to the Somme December 1915 – 30th June 1916. J Jour: The French 6e Armee on the Somme, 1 July 1916, was due in 2019 but, by 2025, had not yet been published.

He published his autobiography in 2024: Making It Up As You Go Along: Notes from a Bass Impostor (Iona Books, 2024).

== Filmography ==
- 2015: Romantic Warriors III: Canterbury Tales (DVD)
