= Lloyd Watson =

English guitarist (1949–2019)

Lloyd Watson (19 October 1949 – 19 November 2019) was an English rock and blues guitarist.

== Life and career ==
Born to a Jamaican father and an English mother in Peterborough, Cambridgeshire, England, Watson's early influences covered the whole spectrum of both black and white music. From an early age he showed a musical talent, initially for the piano, but then for the guitar and astounded fellow schoolmates at Deacon's Grammar School with his performance in the Annual House Competitions.

Self-taught on guitar, Watson quickly emerged as a talented and enthusiastic performer on the circuit in and around the Cambridgeshire town of Peterborough with his band, Lloyd Watson and the Soul Mates. Watson was an early adopter of the wah-wah pedal and one Saturday afternoon, in the late 1960s, the Soul Mates brought Peterborough traffic to a halt playing Cream's "Sunshine of Your Love" and various Hendrix numbers on the steps of Peterborough's ancient Guild Hall in Cathedral Square.

In 1972, Watson won the solo category of the coveted Melody Maker Folk/Rock competition and two days later appeared on BBC Television's The Old Grey Whistle Test. Following his success, he went on to open shows for David Bowie and did two British tours, one supporting King Crimson and the other one for Roxy Music. A European tour for Roxy Music then followed. Asked by Brian Eno to play on Here Come The Warm Jets, Watson then played the majority of the guitar parts for Roxy Music's sax player Andy Mackay's solo album In Search of Eddie Riff. The Roxy Music connection continued when Watson joined the Phil Manzanera spin off group 801, who released the live album 801 Live.
