= Baby's on Fire =

Song by Eno

from the album Here Come the Warm Jets
- Released: 1974
- Recorded: September 1973
- Studio: Majestic Studios, Clapham, London
- Genre: Experimental rock
- Length: 5:19
- Label: Island
- Songwriter: Eno
- Producer: Eno

Official audio
- "Baby's On Fire" (2004 Digital Remaster) on YouTube

"Baby's on Fire" is the third track on English musician Brian Eno's 1974 debut solo album, Here Come the Warm Jets.

== Writing and recording ==
Eno recorded "Baby's on Fire" during the Here Come the Warm Jets sessions in September 1973 at Majestic Studios, Clapham, London, where he had previously recorded the majority of his earlier material. The track was produced by Eno, who handled production and mixing duties on the bulk of the album's recording, and was created with musicians Simon King, Marty Simon, Robert Fripp, Paul Rudolph, and John Wetton. The song is a surreal fantasy about a photography session involving a burning woman and unthinking, laughing onlookers, and two second-hand tobacconists.

Live recordings of the song have appeared on various Eno recordings, the first being June 1, 1974, performed with Kevin Ayers, John Cale, Ollie Halsall and Eddie Sparrow. Eno spoke positively about this performance, saying, "The instruments were incredibly out of tune, so out of tune you wouldn’t believe it. But it sounds fantastic. There’s one little bit in it where there’s a riff between the guitar and one of the bassists, and they’re so out of tune it sounds like cellos. Amazing! I mean if you tried to make that sound in the studio it would have taken you ages. You wouldn’t have thought of making it, in fact, it’s such a bizarre sound. And the piano and guitar are quite well out of tune as well. Ha!"

== Musical composition ==
"Baby's on Fire" is 5 minutes 19 seconds long. The song begins with a tense hi-hat and bass line, along with several different kinds of electronic sounds. Eno's vocals enter after this, being described as "nasal" and "slightly snotty." Following this first section of lyrics is a three-minute guitar solo by Robert Fripp, that he played after he had "just gotten off a plane from America. I had the flu. I was exhausted", with shifting drum beats as backing; Eno's vocal returns as the song ends.

== Release and reception ==
"Baby's on Fire" has received positive reviews from critics, mainly noting the guitar solo. Douglas Wolk of Blender described the song as "a two-note wonder built around an all-hell-breaks-loose guitar meltdown by King Crimson's Robert Fripp", while Chris Ott of Pitchfork Media called the track "earth-shattering". "Baby's on Fire" was featured prominently in the 1998 film Velvet Goldmine, with vocals provided by the film's star, Jonathan Rhys Meyers.

In 2022 Pitchfork named it the 192nd best song of the 1970s, saying "there's a lot going on in this song: a celebration of a catastrophe happening in plain view, knotty wordplay and snappy onomatopoeia, and the vicious camp of Eno’s vocal. The track’s centerpiece is the conflagration of Robert Fripp and Paul Rudolph's all-devouring instrumental break with Eno’s 'treatments' spraying fuel all over it."

== Personnel ==
=== Musicians ===
- Eno – vocals, synthesizers, guitar treatments, keyboards, instrumental arrangements
- Robert Fripp – guitar
- Simon King – drums
- Paul Rudolph – guitar
- Marty Simon – percussion
- John Wetton – bass guitar

=== Technical personnel ===
- Brian Eno – producer, mixer
- Chris Thomas – mixer
- Derek Chandler – recording engineer
- Denny Bridges, Phil Chapman, Paul Hardiman – mixing engineers
- Arun Chakraverty – mastering

== Sources ==
- Tamm, Eric (1995). Brian Eno: His Music and the Vertical Color of Sound. Da Capo Press. ISBN 0-306-80649-5.
