= Matching Mole =

English progressive rock band

- Origin: Canterbury, England
- Genres: Progressive rock, Canterbury scene
- Years active: 1971–1972; 1973
- Label: CBS
- Spinoffs: 801; Hatfield and the North
- Spinoff of: Soft Machine; Caravan; Quiet Sun
- Past members: Bill MacCormick; Robert Wyatt; Phil Miller; Dave Sinclair; Dave MacRae; Francis Monkman; Gary Windo

Matching Mole were an English progressive rock band associated with the Canterbury scene. Robert Wyatt formed the band in October 1971 after he left Soft Machine and recorded his first solo album, The End of an Ear (4 December 1970). He continued his role on vocals and drums and was joined by David Sinclair of Caravan on organ and piano, Dave MacRae on electric piano, Phil Miller of Delivery on guitar and Bill MacCormick of Quiet Sun on bass. The name is a pun on Machine Molle, the French translation of the name of Wyatt's previous group Soft Machine.

== Career ==
Their first eponymous album was released in April 1972, the bulk of which was composed by Wyatt himself, with the exception of "O Caroline" (a Dave Sinclair composition with lyrics by Wyatt about his recent breakup with girlfriend Caroline Coon) and Phil Miller's "Part of the Dance". Sinclair soon dropped out of the group and was replaced by New Zealand-born keyboard player and composer Dave MacRae, who had already played a guest role on the first album. Their second album, Matching Mole's Little Red Record, produced by Robert Fripp of King Crimson, was released in November 1972. This album was more of a team effort, with Wyatt concentrating on lyrics and vocal melodies and leaving the composing to his bandmates.

Matching Mole disbanded in late September 1972 immediately upon completion of a European tour supporting Soft Machine, with Sinclair and Miller going on to form the more successful Hatfield and the North. A new lineup – consisting of Wyatt, MacCormick, ex-Curved Air keyboardist Francis Monkman and jazz saxophonist Gary Windo – was due to record a third album in 1973. This was cancelled when Wyatt fell from a window in June 1973, and was paralysed from the waist down, and therefore unable to continue drumming.

== Personnel ==
- Bill MacCormick – bass (1971–1972, 1973)
- Robert Wyatt – drums, vocals, Mellotron (1971–1972, 1973)
- Phil Miller – guitar (1971–1972; died 2017)
- Dave Sinclair – piano, organ (1971–1972)
- Dave MacRae – piano, organ, electric piano, synthesiser (1972)
- Francis Monkman – keyboards (1973; died 2023)
- Gary Windo – saxophone (1973; died 1992)

== Discography ==
=== Studio albums ===
Date	Title	Notes
April 1972	Matching Mole	–
November 1972	Matching Mole's Little Red Record	Dave Sinclair was replaced on keyboard by Dave MacRae

=== Live albums and compilations ===
Date	Title	Notes
1994	BBC Radio 1 Live in Concert	Mini live album
2001	Smoke Signals	Live album
2002	March	Live album
2006	On the Radio	
2013	Live at the BBC 1972	Japan-only vinyl LP

=== Singles ===
Year	Title
1972	"O Caroline"

== Filmography ==
- 2015: Romantic Warriors III: Canterbury Tales (DVD)
