= Quiet Sun =

English progressive rock band (1970–1972)

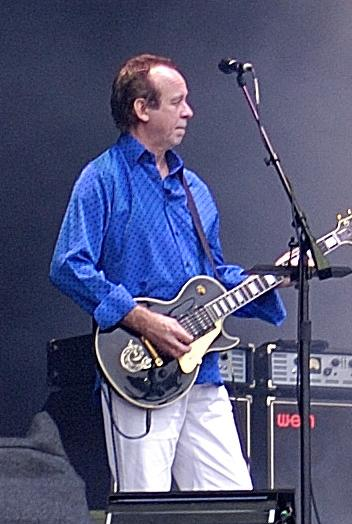
Phil Manzanera (2006)

Quiet Sun were an English progressive rock band from the Canterbury scene consisting of Phil Manzanera (guitars), Bill MacCormick (bass), Dave Jarrett (keyboards) and Charles Hayward (drums).

== History ==
Having originated from a Dulwich College band by the name of Pooh and the Ostrich Feather, Quiet Sun was formed in 1970 after MacCormick had made friends with Robert Wyatt, the son of a friend of his mother's. The band integrated jazz elements and sparkling keyboard sounds into their complex music, in many ways similar to contemporaries Soft Machine. However, energetic guitar by Manzanera was a distinguishing feature from Soft Machine, who tended to use saxophone as their main melodic element alongside keyboards, and who did not feature lead guitar before the 1975 release of Bundles. Quiet Sun split up in 1972, with Manzanera moving on to Roxy Music, MacCormick to Matching Mole, Hayward to session work, and Jarrett began to teach mathematics.

In 1975, Manzanera booked a studio for 26 days to record his album Diamond Head and got Quiet Sun together again to record an album from their old composed material in the studio at the same time. This first and only album of theirs, with participation of Brian Eno and the late Ian MacCormick, titled Mainstream, was critically acclaimed and became the New Musical Express' album of the month. Reworked versions of "Rongwrong" and "Mummy was an asteroid, Daddy was a small non-stick kitchen utensil" both appear on the album 801 Live (the latter is consolidated with a track from Diamond Head, "East of Echo", with the result titled "East of Asteroid"). Quiet Sun would embark on a short tour to promote the album, though Manzanera stepped down halfway through to start work on Roxy Music's Siren. His role was filled in by Charles Bullen, whom Hayward had known on London's improvisation scene, with the pair going on to form This Heat not long after.

== Discography ==
Year	Artist	Title
1975	Quiet Sun	Mainstream
2000	Phil Manzanera	Manzanera Archives: Rare One (includes 4 previously unreleased Quiet Sun demos)
2011	Quiet Sun	Mainstream (deluxe book presentation with 3 of the above bonus tracks plus one more)

== Filmography ==
- 2015: Romantic Warriors III: Canterbury Tales (DVD)
