= Fields of the Nephilim discography =

- Studio albums: 4
- EPs: 3
- Live albums: 2
- Compilation albums: 4
- Singles: 12
- Video albums: 6
- Box sets: 2

This is the discography of English gothic rock band Fields of the Nephilim.

== Albums ==
=== Studio albums ===
Title	Album details	Peak chart positions		
Title	Album details	UK	UK Indie	GER
Dawnrazor	Released: 4 May 1987; Label: Situation Two; Formats: CD, LP, MC	62	1	—
The Nephilim	Released: 5 September 1988; Label: Situation Two; Formats: CD, LP, MC	14	2	—
Elizium	Released: 24 September 1990; Label: Beggars Banquet; Formats: CD, LP, MC	22	—	—
Mourning Sun	Released: 28 November 2005; Label: Oblivion; Formats: CD	—	—	94
"—" denotes releases that did not chart or were not released in that territory.

=== Live albums ===
Title	Album details	Peak chart positions
Title	Album details	UK
Earth Inferno	Released: 25 March 1991; Label: Beggars Banquet; Formats: CD, 2xLP, MC	39
Ceromonies	Released: 13 April 2012; Label: Sacred Symphony; Formats: 2xCD+DVD, 2xLP	97

=== Compilation albums ===
Title	Album details
Laura	Released: 1992; Label: Contempo; Formats: CD, LP, MC; Italy-only release
Revelations	Released: 12 July 1993; Label: Beggars Banquet; Formats: 2xCD, CD, 2xLP, MC
From Gehenna to Here	Released: 30 July 2001; Label: Santeria; Formats: CD, LP; Combines the Burning the Fields and Returning to Gehenna EPs
Fallen	Released: 7 October 2002; Label: Jungle; Formats: CD, LP

=== Box sets ===
Title	Album details
Genesis & Revelation	Released: 23 October 2006; Label: Jungle; Formats: 2xCD+DVD
5 Albums	Released: 22 November 2013; Label: Beggars Banquet; Formats: 5xCD

=== Video albums ===
Title	Album details
Forever Remain	Released: 26 September 1988; Label: Situation Two; Formats: VHS
Morphic Fields	Released: November 1989; Label: Situation Two; Formats: VHS
Visionary Heads	Released: 1991; Label: Beggars Banquet; Formats: VHS
Revelations	Released: 1993; Label: Beggars Banquet; Formats: VHS
Revelations / Forever Remain / Visionary Heads	Released: December 2002; Label: Beggars Banquet; Formats: DVD
Paradise Regained – Live in Dusseldorf	Released: June 2008; Label: Cherry Red Films; Formats: DVD

== EPs ==
Title	Album details	Peak chart positions
Title	Album details	UK Indie
Burning the Fields	Released: June 1985; Label: Tower Release; Formats: 12"	2
Returning to Gehenna	Released: 1986; Label: Supporti Fonografici; Formats: 12"; Italy-only release	15
BBC Radio 1 Live in Concert	Released: 29 June 1992; Label: Windsong International; Formats: CD; Mini-album	—
"—" denotes releases that did not chart.

== Singles ==
Title	Year	Peak chart positions		Album
Title	Year	UK	UK Indie	Album
"Power"	1986	—	24	Non-album singles
"Preacher Man"	1987	—	2	Non-album singles
"Blue Water"	1987	75	1	Non-album singles
"Dawnrazor" (US promo-only release)	1987	—	—	Dawnrazor
"Moonchild"	1988	28	1	The Nephilim
"Psychonaut"	1989	35	2	Non-album single
"For Her Light"	1990	54	—	Elizium
"Sumerland"	1990	37	—	Elizium
"One More Nightmare"/"Darkcell AD"	2000	86	21	Fallen
"From the Fire"	2002	62	13	Fallen
"Straight to the Light" (promo-only release)	2005	—	—	Mourning Sun
"Prophecy"	2016	—	—	Non-album single
"—" denotes releases that did not chart or were not released in that territory.
