= Nephilim in popular culture =

Nephilim in popular culture are depicted as descendants or offspring of demons (fallen angels) and human women. The Nephilim of Genesis 6 have become a notable motif; this interlinks with other similar motifs regarding Christian demons in popular culture.

== Music ==
- The band Fields of the Nephilim took their name from the Nephilim, as did vocalist Carl McCoy’s follow-up band The Nefilim.
- The band AFI has a song entitled "The Nephilim" on their album The Art of Drowning.
- Brooklyn-based rap group Flatbush Zombies have a song called "Nephilim" on their second mixtape BetterOffDEAD.
- The band Katatonia has a song entitled "Nephilim".
- The band Behemoth has a song entitled "The Nephilim Rising" from their 2004 album Demigod.
- Frank Black and the Catholics reference the Nephilim in a song entitled, "All My Ghosts" from their eponymous 1998 album.
- The band Mastodon references Nephilim in their song "Naked Burn."

== Literature ==
- In The Silmarillion, the character Luthien is the child of an elf and Melian the Maia (a voluntarily Earth-bound angel). She would marry the human Beren, and their descendants included numerous important figures in the history of Middle Earth, such as Elrond and Aragorn.
- In the Victor Renquist series, by Mick Farren, the Nephilim are an ancient race of immensely powerful aliens who conquer earth in the early days of humanity, creating the races of the Ancient Ones (proto-vampires) and Urshu (super human "Watchers") to mind humanity. Cthulhu is among their number.
- In the House of Night series, by P.C. Cast and Kristin Cast, Kalona, a Fallen Angel, appears during the fifth book of the series, Hunted and using his unearthly beauty he attempts to take over the world.
- In the novel Angelology by Danielle Trussoni, Nephilim appear as the antagonists to a group of Angelologists, people who study angels, and the battle between the two groups is to gain control of a powerful, sacred object.
- In the series Fallen novels by Lauren Kate, a Nephilim is any person with angel DNA. The Nephilim featured in the novels attend Shoreline school near Mendocino, California, and have not yet made their final choice between good and evil.
- In the series The Mortal Instruments and The Infernal Devices by Cassandra Clare, a Nephilim or Shadowhunter is a descendant of the original Nephilim, who drank the blood of the angel Raziel who gave it to them to defeat the monsters and demons who plagued the world.
- In Becca Fitzpatrick's Hush, Hush saga, fallen angels, archangels, and Nephilim are mentioned, as the main characters and conflicts form around these terms.
- In Thomas Sniegoski's book series The Fallen and the mini-series based on the books, Nephilim are referred to as the children of fallen angels and human women, who are eventually responsible for protecting the world from impending darkness.
- Ayn Rand's novel Atlas Shrugged is known in Modern Hebrew translation as Mered HaNephilim (מרד הנפילים, literally: the revolt/rebellion of the Nephilim)
- The Nephilim figure prominently in the Madeleine L'Engle novel Many Waters, primarily in an antagonistic role.
- In Tom Egeland's book Gospel of Lucifer, Nephilim are referred to as mysterious extraterrestrials who came to the earth over 5000 years ago, to help humanity advance as societies by teaching mathematics, physics and technology.
- Author Richard Kadrey's Sandman Slim series feature a main character by the name of Stark (aka Sandman Slim) who discovers his magic and healing ability are the result of being a Nephilim.
- In Bryan Davis's novel series Dragons in Our Midst and Oracles of Fire, the Nephilim were offspring of fallen angels, known as Watchers, and human women. They were large in stature and evil in nature.
- The silicon-based vampiric creatures in the Tim Powers fantasy/horror novel The Stress of Her Regard are referred to as nephilim.
- In the Warhammer 40k universe, the Nephilim were an alien race on Melchior that were mostly exterminated by the Blood Angels and the Luna Wolves in Fear to Tread by James Swallow. They were later referenced by Traitor Warmaster Horus to the Sons Of Horus (formerly the Luna Wolves) in a plot to turn Sanguinus Primarch of the Blood Angels to his side.
- Karl Ove Knausgård's novel En tid for alt (2004) (English translation A time to every purpose under heaven) discusses the relationship between the nephilim and angels. In the section of the book which deals with events leading up to the Flood, Noah's father, Lamech, reports seeing a nephilim exhibited in a tent at the marketplace in the town of Nod.
- In Jerel Law's Son of Angels, the children are born from Nephilim and are considered to be quarterlings.
- In the science fiction novella Doctor Bizzaro And The Infinite Nim-Tek, Nephilim attempt to seize the world through supernatural mind control and unintentionally create physical manifestations of the subconscious minds of people. Ancient prophesies emerge from the Book of Enoch and the Bible that reveal them to be the offspring of demons.
- In the anime and manga Devils and Realist, Dantalion, one of the main characters, is one of the Nephilim.
- In the anime and manga Blue Exorcist, Rin Okumura, the main character, is a nephilim among few other known nephilims. He was born of a human woman and Satan.

== Film and television ==
- In The X-Files episode "All Souls", Dana Scully attempts to save three Nephilim who appear as young girls with several genetic deformations.
- In the 2004 British TV series Hex, the main antagonist, Azazeal, is part of the Nephilim. He can only show his true demonic form when gaining strength through performing ritual sacrifices with willing participants.
- The second and third Prophecy movies deal with fallen angels and one of the Nephilim.
- Nephilim appear in the US television show Supernatural from the eighth season onwards, most notably with the introduction of Jack Kline, the half-human child of the fallen angel Lucifer, in season 12.
- The film Alien Armageddon (2011) references Nephilim as an invading alien threat, consuming human flesh.
- The 2013 movie based on the first book in The Mortal Instruments series, City of Bones, says the angel Raziel mixed his blood in the Mortal Cup with that of a man named Jonathan Shadowhunter and gave it to men to drink. The men became what is known as Shadowhunters, a.k.a. Nephilim, as did their offspring, and their offspring's children.
- The 2013 anime Senki Zesshou Symphogear G features a creature dubbed the Nephilim, a living relic that devours other relics to increase its power and transforms into increasingly monstrous forms as it does so.
- In the film The Devil's Tomb, Nephilim are portrayed as corrupted, fallen angels.
- In the 2016 TV series Shadowhunters, a reboot of the 2013 movie City of Bones, the Nephilim are portrayed as they were in the book series written by Cassandra Clare. Nephilim will be angel-human hybrids who swear to protect the world from demons.
- In the 2014 movie Noah, they are portrayed as rock monsters.
- In the TV series Lucifer, Nephilim are hybrids between angels and humans. Known Nephilim include Aurora Morningstar, daughter of Lucifer Morningstar and Chloe Decker, as well as Charlie Martin, son of Amenadiel and Linda Martin.

== Traditional games ==
- In the pen and paper Nephilim role-playing game, published in four French editions since 1992 by Multisim and in English by Chaosium for its second edition, players depict Nephilim as powerful elemental entities. In the Chaosium version these incarnate into human beings, in a game containing much symbolism, primarily related to the Hermetic tradition.
- In the Trading Card Game Magic: The Gathering, the Nephilim are a creature card type found in the Guildpact card set. They are shown as creatures of often monstrous appearance, created only to display the power of gods, thus humbling the world's inhabitants.
- In the Spanish role-playing game Anima: Beyond Fantasy, Nephilim are humans who have the soul of a non-human race as well as some of their characteristics (albeit attenuated).
- In White Wolf's Demon: The Fallen, Nephilim are the offspring of demons and humans.

== Video games ==
- In the video game El Shaddai: Ascension of the Metatron, the Nephilim are depicted as semi-humanoid, blob-like creatures that enjoy frolicking through the Tower of Babel. This belies their true nature, as the Nephilim are slowly consuming one another, growing more monstrous and threatening to consume the world. Enoch, the main character, must return the creatures to oblivion by purifying the souls of the Fallen Angels that parented them.
- In the video game DmC: Devil May Cry, the protagonist Dante, as well as his brother Vergil, are Nephilim. In this story, Nephilim are portrayed as half-demon, and half-angel.
- In Diablo and associated media, the term Nephalem is used to describe the extremely powerful offspring of Angels and Demons, who inhabited the world which was created by the pairing of a powerful angel and demon, as a sanctuary from the Eternal Conflict.
- In Champions Online, Nephilims are half angel and half demon enemies, led by their leader Therakiel.
- In Darksiders and Darksiders II, the Four Horsemen of the Apocalypse (referred to as War, Death, Fury, and Strife) are Nephilim, derived from the mingled dust of angels and demons. They are the last surviving Nephilim, with the rest having been killed by the Horsemen eons prior to preserve the balance between the realms of angels, demons and humans. The Nephilim are portrayed as tall, muscular demigods capable of incredible power, such as transforming into giant demons.
- In the video game series Assassin's Creed, the Nephilim are referred as "The Ones Who Came Before" and creators of the Apple of Eden. More consistently referred to as the Precursors or the First Civilization, they created anatomically modern humans, and then vanished following a great disaster.
- In the video game Tomb Raider: The Angel of Darkness, the main antagonist's main goal is to resurrect the Nephilim called "The Sleeper" in order to gain immortality.
- In Guild Wars Factions, "Gavel of the Nephilim" is a weapon that can be chosen as a reward after completing the game's main storyline. The name of this weapon does not refer to any existing character in the game.
- In the Exile and Avernum game series, the Nephilim are portrayed as cat-like humanoids with a fierce tribal culture. They are antagonistic to the titular nation in early installments, but become citizens and playable characters later in the series.
- Xenosaga features the apparition of a young girl in a white dress by the name of Nephilim.
- In Wing Commander: Prophecy, the insectoid antagonist race is named as the Nephilim.
- In Indiana Jones and the Great Circle, Indiana Jones encounters a secret order in the Vatican whose members are giants alleged to be the descendants of Nephilim.
