= Christian demons in popular culture =

Christian demonology appears many times in the bible:

- Hell in popular culture
- The Devil in popular culture

Names of gods and demons from Jewish and Christian sources are often used in film, TV, comics, and video games.

- Abaddon in popular culture – from Book of Revelation
- Azazel in popular culture – from Leviticus
- Azrael (disambiguation) from Apocalypse of Peter
- Baal in popular culture – from 1 Kings
- Belial in popular culture – from Deuteronomy
- Leviathan in popular culture – from the Book of Job
- Lilith in popular culture – from Isaiah and the Talmud
- Moloch in popular culture – from 2 Kings
- Mammon in popular culture – from Gospel of Matthew
- Nephilim in popular culture – from Genesis 6
