= Nikolai Grozni =

American novelist

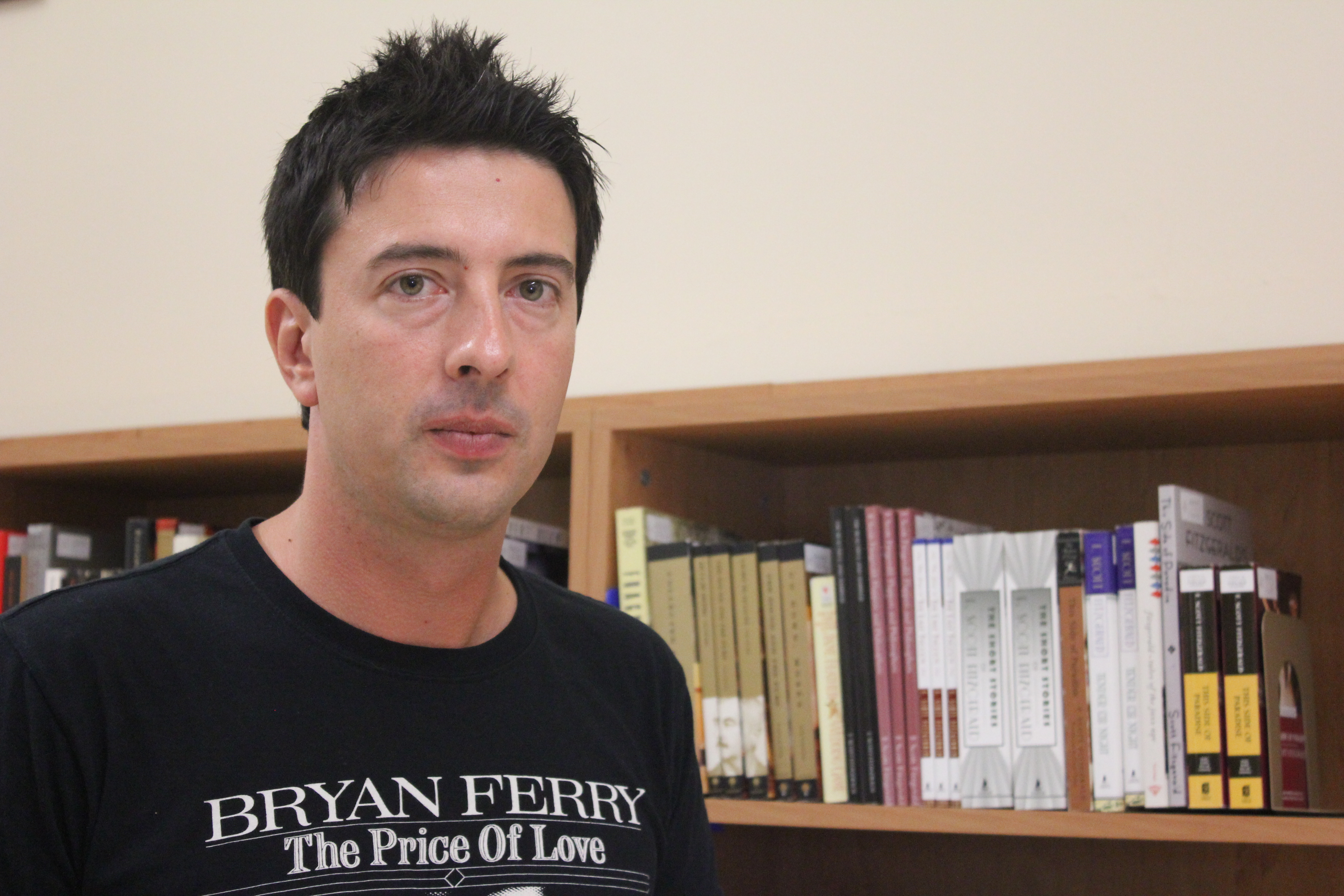
- Nikolai Grozni
- Born: March 28, 1973 (age 53); Sofia, Bulgaria
- Education: Brown University (MFA)
- Occupation: Novelist
- Website: www.nikolaigrozni.com

Nikolai Grozni (born Nikolay Grozdinski, Bulgarian: Николай Гроздински; March 28, 1973) is a multilingual Bulgarian-American novelist, short-story writer and musician.

== Background ==
Grozni was born in Sofia, Bulgaria. After being accepted to the National Music School "Lubomir Pipkov", he trained to become a concert pianist, winning his first international piano award in Salerno, Italy, in 1983. Following the political changes after the fall of the Berlin Wall, in 1992 Grozni left Bulgaria to study Jazz and composition at Berklee College of Music, Boston.

In 1995, Grozni left for India to become a Buddhist monk. He spent four years in Dharamsala, studying at the Institute of Buddhist Dialectics before joining Drepung Monastery in South India in 1999, where he stayed for six months. The five years he spent in India would become the inspiration for his three works in Bulgarian, as well as for his memoir in English: "Turtle Feet: The making and unmaking of a Buddhist monk." Grozni holds an MFA in creative writing from Brown University.

Grozni and his wife, Danielle Trussoni, were featured in an episode of Season 2 of This American Life (TV), in which he discussed his dislike of mowing the lawn.

== Writing ==
- Lives of Idle Men and Degenerate Mystics. (short stories, published in Bulgarian in 2000)
- Asleep In the Great Emptiness. (a novel, published in Bulgarian in 2001)
- Someone put a Spell on Existence. (a novel, published in Bulgarian in 2002)
- Turtle Feet, New York Times Editor’s Choice (memoir, Riverhead, 2008)
- Wunderkind (a novel, Free Press, 2011)
- Farewell, Monsieur Gaston (a novel, East West, 2014)
- Claustrophobias (short stories, Begemot, 2016)
- Heliotropes (poems, Begemot, 2020)
- Songs for the Dust (poetry collection, 2021)

Grozni's short fiction has appeared in The Guardian, The Seattle Review, and Harper's Magazine.

== Reviews ==
- New York Times: Turtle Feet
- Asleep in the Great Emptiness
- People Magazine:Turtle Feet
- Brown Alumni Magazine: Turtle Feet
- Lives of Idle Men and Degenerate Mystics
- Christian Science Monitor: Turtle Feet

== Interviews ==
- BCS News Magazine
- Powell's Books
- Brown Alumni Magazine
- Lives of Idle Men and Degenerate Mystics
