= Sons of Angels =

Sons of Angels may refer to:

- former name of Crush 40, Japanese band
- Sons of Angels (Norwegian band), Norwegian band

== See also ==
- Son of Angels
