= Carl McCoy =

British singer

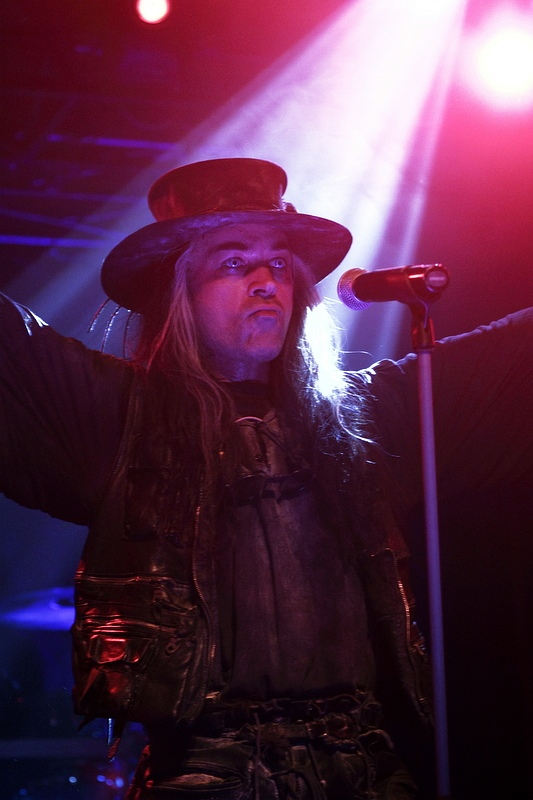
- McCoy in 2011

Background information
- Born: Carl Douglas McCoy; 15 January 1963 (age 62); Lambeth, London, England
- Genres: Gothic rock, gothic metal, death metal, industrial metal
- Occupation: Singer
- Years active: 1984–present
- Labels: Beggars Banquet, Jungle, Situation Two, Sacred Symphony
- Member of: Fields of the Nephilim
- Formerly of: Nefilim
- Website: fields-of-the-nephilim.com

Carl Douglas McCoy (born 15 January 1963) is an English singer, who is best known as the frontman for the gothic rock band Fields of the Nephilim and The Nefilim.

== Biography ==
McCoy frequently uses mystical and occult references in his lyrics. Samples of Aleister Crowley's voice were featured on Elizium.

McCoy owns a graphics company, Sheerfaith, which has supplied art and design for all of his musical projects. Sheerfaith has also produced artwork for other projects, such as for the Storm Constantine book Hermetech and Andrew Collins' 21st Century Grail. He is a 3D artist, a longtime user of LightWave 3D.

McCoy appeared as the nomad in the film Hardware (1990), directed by Richard Stanley, who had previously directed a number of videos for Fields of the Nephilim.

== Personal life ==
McCoy comes from a religious background; he grew up in England with his mother, who was a devout member of the Jehovah's Witness. McCoy would later deal with this, often critically, in many of his songs such as "Chord of Souls". He has talked in interviews about his belief in paganism.

== Vocal style ==
McCoy's vocal style has been described as sounding like he 'gargles with gravel.' He attributes this to a childhood laryngeal burn: "I only sang the way I sang because I burnt my throat when I was a kid. I got hot food stuck down there and my throat got singed. I couldn’t talk for four weeks, but the effects lasted forever!"

== Discography ==
- Dawnrazor (1987)
- The Nephilim (1988)
- Elizium (1990)
- Earth Inferno (1991)
- Zoon (1996)
- Mourning Sun (2005)
- Ceromonies (2012)
- Watain – Lawless Darkness (2010, guest vocals)
