= Rubicon (English band) =

- Origin: England
- Genres: Gothic rock
- Labels: Atlantic, Beggars Banquet
- Spinoff of: Fields of the Nephilim
- Members: Andy Delany; Peter Yates; Paul Wright; Tony Pettitt; Nod Wright

Rubicon was an early 1990s offshoot of the band Fields of the Nephilim who released two albums.

What Starts, Ends on Atlantic Records and on Beggars Banquet Records in 1992 (catalogue reference – BBQ CD 128) was produced by Mark Freegard, and featured two singles: "Crazed" (BBQ 4CD) and "Before My Eyes" (BBQ 10CD).

Room 101 was released on Beggars Banquet in 1995. It was produced, engineered and mixed by Richard James Burgess under the pseudonym Caleb Kadesh. The album featured the single "Insatiable" (BBQ47CD).

The brothers Wright later formed the band Last Rites.

== Members ==
- Andy Delany – vocals
- Peter Yates – guitar, keyboards
- Paul Wright – guitar
- Tony Pettitt – bass guitar
- (Alexander) Nod Wright – drums, percussion, keyboards

== Discography ==
Year	Album	Single
1992		"Watch Without Pain"
1992	What Starts, Ends	
1992		"Crazed"
1993		"Before My Eyes"
1995	Room 101	
1995		"Insatiable"
