= Last Rites (band) =

English rock band

- Origin: United Kingdom
- Genres: Gothic rock
- Labels: Last Rites Music
- Spinoff of: Fields of the Nephilim, Rubicon
- Members: Nod Wright; Paul Wright
- Past members: Bob Ahern; James Quinn

Last Rites are an English goth band formed by Alexander "Nod" Wright and Paul Wright, with Bob Ahern and James Quinn.

After releasing two albums with Rubicon, What Starts, Ends, and Room 101, the Wright brothers felt it was time to move on. "Rubicon came to a point where the band had reached a final stage," Nod Wright told Zillo magazine in 2001. "To be honest, it just didn't make sense any more to continue. But it opened our eyes for things which seemed reliable to us and which we definitely wanted to pursue. The most important thing was to continue making music."

Nod Wright also told Zillo that he handled much of the recording of Last Rites' first album, Guided by Light. He also performed all the band's vocals.

He told Metal Invader that much of the material for Guided by Light had been written originally for Fields of the Nephilim, and probably would have been part of that band's next record had they not broken up in the early 1990s.

About.com called the debut "An album that remains steeped in the classic Gothic architecture of years past with a dynamic view of the future, an ambitious and atmospheric creation."

Last Rites followed Guided by Light with the release of a limited-edition EP, My World Alight, in 2004, and another full-length studio album, The Many Forms, in 2005. "Somewhere between electro and metal, Last Rites create a modern sound; a hypnotic, cold and heavy groove which works all the way through this second indie studio album," music writer Emmanuel Hennequin said of The Many Forms in a review for Obskure magazine.

== Discography ==
- Guided by Light (studio album, 2001, Dream Catcher).
- My World Alight (individually signed limited edition EP, 2004, Last Rites).
- The Many Forms (studio album, 2005, Last Rites).
