= Eric Simonoff =

Literary agent

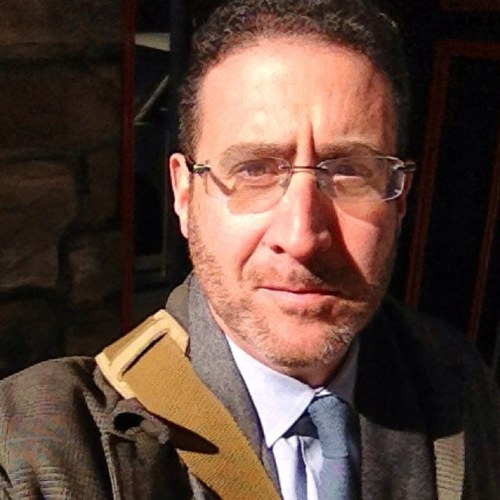
- Born: Eric Matthew Simonoff; July 21, 1967; Philadelphia, Pennsylvania, U.S.
- Occupation: Literary agent
- Children: 2

Eric Matthew Simonoff is a literary agent at William Morris Endeavor.

== Biography ==
Eric Simonoff was born to a Jewish family in Philadelphia on July 21, 1967. He graduated from Princeton University in 1989, with a degree in Classics. Simonoff began his publishing career at W.W. Norton as an editorial assistant, then joined Janklow & Nesbit in 1991 and rose to the position of co-director. He left Janklow & Nesbit for William Morris Endeavor in 2009. His switch in agencies was considered a major event in the publishing industry. Simonoff represents more than a dozen New York Times bestselling authors.

== Partial List of clients ==
- Jonathan Lethem
- Douglas Preston, author of The Monster of Florence: A True Story
- Vikram Chandra
- Stephen Chbosky, author of The Perks of Being a Wallflower
- Lincoln Child
- Norah Vincent, author of Self Made Man
- Andrew Davidson
- James Frey, controversial author of A Million Little Pieces.
- Bob Greene
- Edward P. Jones, Pulitzer prize winner.
- Jhumpa Lahiri, Pulitzer prize winner.
- Alexander Maksik, novelist
- Thisbe Nissen
- Trenton Lee Stewart
- Walter Kirn
- Roger Reeves
- Stacy Schiff, Pulitzer prize winner
- Ian W. Toll
- Nam Le
- Qian Julie Wang
- The New Yorker Magazine
- Phil Klay, author of Redeployment
- Chris Robinson and Gavin Kovite, authors of War of the Encyclopaedists
- Yaa Gyasi
- Chandler Burr
