= Mammon in literature, film, and popular culture =

The Hebrew term mammon, personifying money in the New Testament, has led to many adaptations in literature, film, and popular culture.

== Literature ==
In John Milton's Paradise Lost, Mammon is a fallen angel, described as being "more interested in heaven's pavements" than the leader. He tells the other fallen angels to be content in Hell.

In Past and Present (1843), Thomas Carlyle describes Victorian England's worship of money as the "Gospel of Mammonism".

The Phantom of the Opera worships Mammon in Frederick Forsyth's The Phantom of Manhattan.

In The Alchemist by Ben Jonson, Sir Epicure Mammon is a man obsessed with material wealth.

O. Henry's short story "Mammon and the Archer" is about two young people who seem to find genuine attraction, untainted by their parent's wealth, but the story has the trademark O. Henry twist. The archer of the title is a reference to Cupid.

In Between Two Fires by Christopher Buehlman, Lucifer is destroyed in the second war between angels and devils, leaving Mammon in charge of Hell.

The Book Of Mozilla uses Mammon as a metaphor for Microsoft Internet Explorer.

== Film ==
In Pale Rider, Mammon is referred to by the preacher in the usual sense (You cannot serve both God and Mammon) in his deliberations with a corrupt businessman who has hired thugs and a grim band of deputies, in to run a settlement of gold prospectors off their claim so that he can extract all wealth from the land using destructive, deafening industrial methods.

In Constantine, Mammon is the son of Lucifer/Satan himself, conceived before his father fell from Heaven but born after Satan was sent to Hell. He has a lust for power and tries to gain control over Earth with the aid of renegade angel Gabriel (Gabriel seeking to make humanity worthy of God's love by forcing them to endure Hell on Earth). He is defeated when John Constantine manages to summon Lucifer to collect him by attempting suicide. Lucifer destroys Gabriel's wings and banishes Mammon back to Hell, stating that he prefers to wait and see Earth come to him on its own.

In The Inheritance, billionaire Charles Abernathy made a deal with the demon Mammon to inherit his wealth in exchange for his soul on the condition that all Abernathy relations were to die when his time was up.

Mammon makes a short appearance in the 2022 film The Devil Conspiracy.

== Comics ==
In the comic book series Spawn, Mammon is depicted as a handsome gentleman, suave and sophisticated, who often assists Spawn in his quests. This demon is often seen making attractive deals with humans for their souls and is thought to be quite persuasive. While originally thought of as the Devil himself, he is later revealed to originally be one of a faction of angels who took no side in the struggle between Hell and Heaven and were thus shunned by both. He served as one of the primary antagonists of the series.

In the comic book series God Is Dead by Jonathan Hickman and Mike Costa, Mammon is accidentally created in an underground lab in an attempt to build a god capable of destroying the World's most powerful pantheons, as they battle for control over the human population. He is depicted as a large red-skinned demon, with pointy wings, small horns, glowing white eyes, and pointy fangs.

In Superman Beyond #2 (part of "Final Crisis"), Mammon is described as the god of the anti-matter universe god by Ultraman.

The Black Monday Murders features Mammon as a central entity of discussion and worship, a god who grants his favor "and the gifts that this favor yields" to the magical traditions of the world, who give him "loyalty and service" in return.

In the webcomic Kill Six Billion Demons, Mammon is a so-called demiurge, one of the seven powerful individuals who rule over the multiverse. He is an elderly dragon-like creature whose lair is an infinite vault filled with riches and whose servants are obsessed with counting it.

== Video and tabletop games ==
In several campaign settings of Dungeons & Dragons, Mammon is an archdevil, known as the Lord of Avarice, one of the archdukes and the ruler of the Third Layer of Hell.

In the role-playing video game (RPG) In Nomine, Mammon is the Demon Prince of Greed.

The tabletop skirmish game Trench Crusade features Mammon as one of the princes of Hell, the most popular patron of mortal worshippers and prince of greed.

Mammon is portrayed as the son of Lucifer, and uses the model "Infested Kerrigan" in the Heaven's Last Defense map in the realm of StarCraft.

In the SNES RPG Chrono Trigger, the plot involves a device known as the Mammon Machine, created by Queen Zeal, who believed it would make her kingdom the most wealthy and powerful.

In Quest 64, the final boss is Mammon, a large demon who envied the uniqueness of human life and therefore wanted to destroy it out of envy.

Mammon is the name given to the Shadow of Kunikazu Okumura, the fifth boss of Persona 5.

In the Japanese arcade rhythm game Beatmania IIDX, Mammon is portrayed as "Mamonis", by popular musician Kors k. His music track is composed to reflect the yearnings of mankind.

In the visual novel Umineko no Naku Koro ni, Mammon is one of the Seven Sisters of Purgatory, a group of demons in service to the Golden Witch.

In the 2019 visual novel Obey Me!, Mammon is the Avatar of Greed and is the second oldest of the seven demon brothers, and the first to enter a pact with the main character.

Mamon is the name of a legendary goatfolk and optional boss in Caves of Qud.

Mammon appears as one of the Demon Lords to be fought in Darksiders Genesis.

Mammon appears as an "Archangel" boss in Cassette Beasts as a physical manifestation of the rampant capitalism of worlds that put profit above all else, including human suffering.

Mammon is the demonic leader of the "Knights of Avarice" faction in the miniature wargame Trench Crusade, Where he deceives and convinces humans to join his cause in exchange for great rewards and wealth, literally selling their souls to him and having to pay a debt to him by killing and/or looting the places and people the Knights attack. His greatest objective is take control of the antique treasures of the Queen of Sheba.

== Manga ==
In the manga Beelzebub, Mammon is the name of one of the demons associated with the Killer Six Elements.

In the light novel Shakugan no Shana, Mammon is one of the most powerful Crimson Lords under Bal Masqué.

In the anime Seven Mortal Sins, Mammon is one of the Demon Lords, with her followers working as babysitters for her many children.

== Television ==
In the adult animated web series Helluva Boss, Mammon is featured as the King of Greed and one of the seven demon kings of Hell, ruling over his own Ring of Greed. He also owns the theme park Loo Loo Land which is a rip-off of his "friend" Lucifer's Lu Lu World. He is depicted as a jester, and his appearance is used as iconography and branding in the Greed Ring, including the in-universe currency. Mammon would debut in the seventh episode of the second season centered around him and his history with Fizzaroli. He is voiced by Michael Cusack.

On The Simpsons, Montgomery Burns lives at the corner of Croesus and Mammon Streets.
