= Angelology (novel) =

2010 novel by Danielle Trussoni

- First edition
- Author: Danielle Trussoni
- Language: English
- Genre: Thriller
- Publisher: Viking
- Publication date: March 9, 2010
- Publication place: United States
- Media type: Hardcover
- Pages: 464
- ISBN: 978-0-670-02147-5

Angelology is a first novel by Danielle Trussoni. It was published by Viking Press in March 2010.

== Plot ==
The story follows a nun in New York who unwittingly reignites an ancient war between Angelologists, a group who study angels, and a race of descendants of angels and humans called the Nephilim. The story blends ancient biblical pericopes, the myth of Orpheus, and the fall of rebel angels.

== Characters ==
- Dr. Raphael Valko: A French professor who coordinates an extraction of a body of a fallen angel from a cave in the Rhodope Mountains in 1943. Seraphina Valko is Dr. Valko's wife. The excavation of the fallen angel's body is located in an area that has historical ties to Orpheus and Greek mythology.
- Evangeline: Her father gave her to Franciscan nuns to raise. After she has taken vows, she starts to doubt her religion and starts investigating her parents, who were angelologists.
- Percival Grigori: A Nephilim villain.
- Verlaine: One art student, who is smitten with Sister Evangeline, and assists her in finding artifacts related to angels and stands beside her in the fight against the Nephilim.
- Gabriella Lévi-Franche Valko: An angelologist, whose activities as a 21 year old women directed the course of history.

== Publishing and film interest ==
Eric Simonoff, then at Janklow & Nesbit, agented the book. In early 2009, seven different publishing houses vied for the manuscript. It eventually went to Viking Press for an undisclosed amount. According to Publishers Weekly, a reputable industry publication, the final offer was "well into six figures".

Apart from publishing industry interest, two motion picture studios, Columbia Pictures and Universal Pictures, bid against each other for the film rights, with Columbia winning.

Andrea Gianetti and DeVon Franklin (Columbia's executive producers on The Da Vinci Code and Angels & Demons) are currently overseeing the project. Will Smith and James Lassiter's Overbrook Entertainment will co-produce with director Marc Forster. Marc Forster will be directing the film.
