= Ceromonies =

Live album by Fields of the Nephilim
- Released: April 2012
- Recorded: 12 and 13 July 2008; London, England
- Venues: 02 Shepherd’s Bush Empire. White City, London.
- Genre: Gothic rock
- Label: Sacred Symphony
- Producer: Carl McCoy

Fields of the Nephilim chronology
| Mourning Sun (2005) | Ceromonies (2012) |

Ceromonies is a three-disc DVD and CD set from Fields of the Nephilim, featuring footage recorded 12 and 13 July 2008, at London's Shepherds Bush Empire. It was released in April 2012. "Ceromonies" is an intentional misspelling; the dates were chosen in honour of the anniversary of the birth of John Dee, Queen Elizabeth I's astrologer. The word also refers to the word "zero" in other languages.

== Track listing ==
DVD
| No. | Title | Length |
|---|---|---|
| 1. | "Shroud (Exordium)" |
| 2. | "Straight To The Light" |
| 3. | "From The Fire" |
| 4. | "Penetration" |
| 5. | "Wail Of Sumer" |
| 6. | "And There Your Heart Will Be Also" |
| 7. | "Trees Come Down" |
| 8. | "Moonchild" |
| 9. | "Psychonaut" |
| 10. | "Mourning Sun" |

CD 1 (Ad Mortem)
| No. | Title | Length |
|---|---|---|
| 1. | "Shroud (Exordium)" |
| 2. | "Straight To The Light" |
| 3. | "From The Fire" |
| 4. | "Penetration" |
| 5. | "Shine" |
| 6. | "Wail Of Sumer" |
| 7. | "And There Your Heart Will Be Also" |
| 8. | "Trees Come Down" |
| 9. | "Psychonaut" |

CD 2 (Ad Vitam)
| No. | Title | Length |
|---|---|---|
| 1. | "Intro (Harmonica Man)" |
| 2. | "Preacher Man" |
| 3. | "Moonchild" |
| 4. | "Requiem" |
| 5. | "Xiberia" |
| 6. | "Zoon (Wakeworld)" |
| 7. | "Mourning Sun" |
| 8. | "Celebrate" |
| 9. | "Last Exit For the Lost (iTunes bonus track, recorded at Hildesheim M'era Luna Festival 10/8/2008)" |

== Members ==
- Carl McCoy - Vocals
- John ‘Capachino’ Carter - Bass Guitar
- Tom Edwards - Guitar (Deceased)
- Gav King - Guitar
- Lee Newell - Drums
