= Revelations (Fields of the Nephilim album) =

Compilation album by Fields of the Nephilim
- Released: 1993
- Recorded: 1993
- Genre: Gothic rock
- Length: 74:54
- Label: Beggars Banquet
- Producer: Fields of the Nephilim & Andy Jackson

Fields of the Nephilim chronology
Earth Inferno (1991)	Revelations (1993)	Fallen (2002)

Revelations is a compilation album by the gothic rock band Fields of the Nephilim. The album was released in 1993 by Beggars Banquet Records.

== Track listing ==
1. "Moonchild (Longevity)" – 5:40
2. "Chord of Souls" - 5:10
3. "Last Exit for the Lost" - 9:31
4. "Preacher Man" - 4:54
5. "Love Under Will" - 6:10
6. "Power" - 4:22
7. "Psychonaut Lib. III" - 9:13
8. "For Her Light (Two)" - 4:16
9. "Blue Water (Electrostatic)" - 5:51
10. "Vet For The Insane" - 6:01
11. "Watchman" - 5:20
12. "Dawnrazor (Live)" - 8:26

The actual versions of tracks 1, 8 and 9 are not mentioned on the sleeve or disc. They are in fact mixes previously only available on the vinyl 12 inches and appearing on CD for the first time, while tracks 3, 5, 6, 10 and 11 are shortened edits of album or single versions.

Some releases included a bonus disc containing the following:

1. "Submission Two (The Dub Posture)" - 4:18
2. "Preacher Man (Contaminated Mix)" - 4:19
3. "Celebrate (Second Seal)" - 6:01
4. "Shiva" - 4:50
5. "Psychonaut Lib. I" - 4:22
6. "In Every Dream Home A Heartache" (Roxy Music Cover) - 6:41
7. "Moonchild (Unsealed)" - 5:53
