= Belial in popular culture =

The demon Belial, or characters named for him, have appeared in many examples of modern culture. This is distinct from medieval culture and Milton where Belial was related to the character in Jewish sources.

== Literature ==
- In John Milton's Paradise Lost, Belial is one of the highest demons cast out of heaven along with Satan – though Milton's use of Belial is allegorical.
- In Philip K. Dick's The Divine Invasion, Belial is The Adversary, whose influence around Earth obfuscates reality and interferes with Yah's powers.
- Steven Brust's To Reign in Hell features Belial as one of the Firstborn, an angel of the highest order that takes the form of a dragon.
- In Graham Masterton's "Master of Lies", a/k/a "Black Angel", a series of murders in San Francisco is related to rituals to raise Belial.
- In the novel Nevada by Joshua Stephen Porter, Belial is a talking lizard who preaches Satanism, especially the elements of self-sufficiency to a very receiving America.
- In Aldous Huxley's Ape and Essence, the post-apocalyptic civilization in Los Angeles worships Belial.
- In Robert A. Heinlein's novel Job: A Comedy of Justice, Alex and Margrethe are granted their request to spend eternity together operating a small town diner and soda-fountain which they acquired with a loan from a bank managed by "Mr. Belial".
- In John Connolly's novel A Game of Ghosts, Belial provides the motivation for some of the characters throughout the book but only appears towards the end. Belial is depicted as androgynous and possessing bird-like wings and claws.

== Music ==
- Lord Belial is a Swedish black metal band.
- The American black metal band Grand Belial's Key was named after Belial.
- The deathcore band Infant Annihilator references Belial in the 15th track of their debut album, The Palpable Leprosy Of Pollution, An Exhalation of Disease.
- The 2013 song "Year Zero", by Swedish metal band Ghost, refers to Belial and several other demons.
- Belial is mentioned in the song "Fall from Grace" from Morbid Angel's 1991 album, Blessed Are the Sick.
- American technical death metal band The Faceless have a track called "Sons of Belial" on their 2008 album Planetary Duality.
- Belial is mentioned in the song, "In Ancient Days," by the British band Black Widow.
- The Norwegian black metal band Mayhem includes Belial's name in their song "Pandaemon," in which he is the second demon listed.

== Television ==
- Belial is mentioned in the Barney Miller episode "Possession". A man who seasons earlier claimed to be a werewolf now believes that he has been possessed by a demon, who makes him smash a Nativity scene display at a department store.
- Belial is the name of a weapons dealer in the Kings episode "Brotherhood".
- In the superhero television series Legends of Tomorrow, Hell is ruled by a triumvirate made up of Belial, Beelzebub, and Satan. Belial is portrayed by actor Mel Tuck.
- In the Japanese tokusatsu franchise Ultraman, a character named after Belial called Ultraman Belial appears as a recurring antagonist and character.
- Belial is the name of a demon who possesses police officer Nick Knight in the Forever Knight episode "Sons of Belial".

== Films ==
- In Nosferatu (1922), the titular vampire originated from "Belial's seed," implying Belial's hand in the creation of vampires.
- Belial possessed the titular character in The Exorcism of Emily Rose (2005).
- Belial is the name given to the deformed Siamese twin brother of Duane Bradley in Basket Case (1982) and its sequels Basket Case 2 (1990) and Basket Case 3: The Progeny (1993).
- In BloodRayne (2002), based on the eponymous video game, Belial is an ancient vampire who had learned to overcome the vampires' inherent weaknesses.
- Mega Monster Battle: Ultra Galaxy (2009) features Ultraman Belial, an Ultra Warrior who was banished after his attempt to steal the Plasma Spark. He was transformed by Alien Raybrad into a warrior of darkness and has since then fought other Ultra Warriors, gaining a rival in the form of Ultraman Zero.
- In The Prophecy: Uprising (2005), Belial is portrayed by Doug Bradley. In the film, Belial is searching for the Lexicon, a book still being written by God, and takes the forms of people he murders while searching for the Lexicon. He plans on using the book to create a new, more aggressive hell. Belial is portrayed as a fallen angel who has rebelled against Satan, whom he sees as having gone soft.
- In Dylan Dog: Dead of Night (2011), Belial is a powerful demon which can be summoned through a magical artifact, the Heart, which contains his blood.
- In Annabelle (2014), the word "Belial" can be seen in a book on the occult.
- In Ready or Not (2019), the Le Domas family practices Satanic rituals to uphold a Faustian pact made by a former family patriarch. The deal was made with a sea merchant by the name of "Mr. Le Bail" (an anagram of Belial).
- In Ghoulies (1984), Belial is a demon summoned throughout the film.

== Video games ==
- The role-playing game In Nomine, based around angels and fallen angels, has Belial as Hell's Demon prince of Fire and the enemy of the archangel Gabriel.
- In Devil May Cry 4, one of the early bosses is Berial, a centaur-like demon and the Conqueror of the Fire Hell.
- In Shining Force, Belial is a type of non-boss, non-unique enemy character unit.
- In Lands of Lore: Guardians of Destiny, the main antagonist is an Ancient named Belial.
- In the Five Nights at Freddy's fan game Oblitus Casa, one of the "Toons" is named Belial.
- In the video game series Painkiller, Belial is depicted as an angel/demon hybrid who was cast out by Lucifer and the other angels for his heritage and sought revenge against his divine brethren when Lucifer ordered Cerberus to amputate Belial's wings.
- In Realms of the Haunting, Belial appears as one of the main antagonists.
- In Odin Sphere, Belial appears as one of the dragons the characters must defeat in several occasions.
- In Final Fantasy XII, Belial (named as "Belias the Gigas") appears as a boss. After the player defeats him, he can obtain him as an Esper and summon him in battle. Belial later appears as an enemy in Crisis Core: Final Fantasy VII.
- In Dungeons & Dragons, Belial is the former ruler of the fourth layer of the Nine Hells, Phlegethos.
- Belial appears in the Megami Tensei series, which depicts him as a red, winged demon wielding a trident. In Devil Survivor, he appears as one of the participants in the War of Bel.
- In the Gothic series of games, Beliar is the name given to one of the three Gods, and he is the God of Darkness. His minions and armies generally play the role of antagonists in the games.
- In the Devil Summoner games, Belial is one of the demons required for the fusion of Alice and is one of her two legal guardians, the other one being Nebiros. Upon Alice's defeat, they capture her soul in a staff and beg the protagonist to revive her with it.
- Belial, named Beliar, appears in the BloodRayne series, depicted as a monster who continuously grows until he kills the player.
- In the Warhammer 40k universe, Belial was once a Sergeant of the veteran first company of the Dark Angels chapter, the Deathwing. However, he has now ascended to Master of the entire 1st Company.
- Morrigan Aensland in the Darkstalkers series of fighting games is the adopted daughter of Belial.
- Belial is one of the heroes in the online game Emil Chronicle Online.
- In the Diablo series, Belial is one of the Seven Great Evils, the demon lords that rule the Burning Hells and try to take over Sanctuary. He is the final boss of act two in Diablo 3.
- In the Dragon Quest series, Belial appears a regular late game monster.
- In Mechassault, Belial is a medium class BattleMech. It weighs in at ~50 tons and has a top speed of 35 mph. Ordnance carried by Belial includes a Pulse Laser, Gauss Rifle x2, and Crossbow Missiles. Its defensive/special ability is the use of jump jets.
- In Darksiders II, Belial is the last boss who Death must confront in the "Demon Lord Belial" DLC and is one of the beings responsible for the extinction of humankind.
- In Total Annihilation: Kingdoms, Belial is the god of Taros, and appears in the game as the Spawn of Belial, the deity unit of Taros.
- In Dungeon Keeper 2, Belial is the name of one of the player's rivals.
- In The Binding of Isaac, one of the items found in the Devil Room is the Book of Belial, which increases the player character's damage for the current room. While under its effect, they gain bloody tears and an inverted cross on their forehead. One of the playable characters, Judas, starts with this item.
- In The Dark Pictures: Switchback VR, Belial is female and is the main antagonist of the game.
- In Amanda the Adventurer 2, Belial is referenced as one of several trickster demons.

== Comic books ==
- In the DC Universe, Belial is the father of Lord Scapegoat, Etrigan the Demon, and Merlin, and an occasional member of Hell's former ruling Triumvirate (more often consisting of Lucifer, Azazel and Beelzebub). He also plays a part in the Reign in Hell miniseries as a lackey of Neron, another ruler of Hell. The villain Sabbac, who gets his powers from six demons, also gets wisdom from Belial.
- Belial (spelled B'Liale) is a major villain in the Avengelyne comic book series.
- Belial appears in the Image Comics series Spawn where he is a villain and the president of Hell.

== Anime ==
- Belial is the name of the demon that appears in front of Ataru in the 17th episode of Urusei Yatsura.
- The Digimon BelialVamdemon appears as an antagonist in Digimon Adventure 02. He is the most lethal form of the Digimon Myotismon, combining Myotismon's intelligence and Venom Myotismon's power.

== Manga ==
- Belial is a character in the manga Angel Sanctuary by Kaori Yuki. The character calls herself Mad Hatter and serves Lucifer, having fallen in love with him.
- In the manga series Vassalord, it was revealed that Barry, an incubus with shapeshifting abilities, is the demon Belial.
- Belial is a central character in the manga series Tarot Cafe.
- Belial is one of Hakuryuu Ren's Djinns in the manga series Magi: The Labyrinth of Magic.
- A character in To Love-Ru and female protagonist in its sequel To Love-Ru Darkness, Momo "Belia" Deviluke is named after Belial or Beelzebub, while her father and two older sisters are named after other superior spirits mentioned in Grand Grimoire (her father Lucifer, her eldest sister Satan, and her second eldest sister Astaroth).
- Belial is the name of Leonard Testarossa's Arm Slave in Full Metal Panic! Sigma.
- In High School DxD, Belial is one of the 72 Devil Noble Families of the Ars Goetia, the most famous member is Diehauser Belial. He is the head of the current House of Belial, ranked number one in the Rating Games for a long time and he is known as the Emperor. Diehauser is one of the spectators at Rias and Sairaorg's Rating Game, giving Issei and Sairaorg a run for their money. After Beelzebud was created, it allowed him show his new attacks from the devils he has worked with. Until Diehauser won the game after defeating Bandersnatch. Until in Volume 17, Diehauser Belial betrayed the Three Factions and allied Rizevim Livan Lucifer to investigate the truth behind the death of his beloved cousin Cleria Belial who was executed for her tragic romance with a Christian exorcist.
- In Blue Exorcist, Belial is a demon who serves Mephisto.
