= War of the Encyclopaedists =

2015 novel by Christopher Robinson and Gavin Kovite

- Initial release cover
- Author: Christopher Robinson and Gavin Kovite
- Language: English
- Publisher: Charles Scribner's Sons
- Publication date: 2015
- Publication place: United States
- Pages: 448 (Hardcover)
- ISBN: 9781476775425

War of the Encyclopaedists is a novel by Christopher Robinson and Gavin Kovite. Published by Charles Scribner's Sons on 19 May 2015, the novel follows two friends, Mickey Montauk, a National Guard officer who is deployed to the Iraq War, and Halifax Corderoy, a graduate student at Boston University. The deployment of Montauk separates the two and they stay in touch via editing a Wikipedia entry.

== Background ==
The plot draws from the two authors' personal experiences, Robinson called the main characters "more despicable versions of us". Kovite fought in Baghdad during the Iraq War between 2004 and 2005 and Robinson is a poet. The authors met in 2005 at a poetry program in Rome, writing of this novel started in 2009 and it took around four years.

== Critical reception ==
Michiko Kakutani writing for The New York Times claimed that while the article can seem "ad hoc and overly stage-managed" with characters crossing paths with "startling ease", it does so in a "intimate" and "breezy" way, concluding with calling the novel "captivating". Ben East of The Observer wrote that while the book accurately portrays both "bohemian academia" and "unpopular military operations", "the narrative itself never quite coheres into a satisfying whole".
