= Fallen (Fields of the Nephilim album) =

Compilation album by Fields of the Nephilim
- Released: October 2002
- Genres: Gothic rock; gothic metal
- Length: 40:17; 25:41 (Bonus Live Disc); 15:48 (Bonus Disc)
- Label: Jungle Records

Fields of the Nephilim chronology
Revelations (1993)	Fallen (2002)	Mourning Sun (2005)

Professional ratings
Review scores
Source	Rating
AllMusic	3/5 stars

Fallen is a compilation album by Fields of the Nephilim, released after an 11-year hiatus. Upon release, the band's website described the disc as an unauthorised release of unreleased and partly unfinished demos, "pilfered" by their record label.

== Track listing ==
1. "Dead to the World" – 3:57
2. "From the Fire" – 5:53
3. "Thirst" – 2:36
4. "Darkcell A.D." – 3:52
5. "Subsanity" – 4:32
6. "Hollow Doll" – 4:48
7. "Fallen" – 3:51
8. "Deeper" – 3:54
9. "Premonition" – 1:42
10. "One More Nightmare (Trees Come Down A.D.)" – 5:12

=== Bonus Live Disc (digi-pack edition) ===
1. "Endemoniada" – 6:15
2. "Last Exit for the Lost" – 8:05
3. "Dawnrazor" – 7:32
4. "The Sequel" – 3:49

recorded live at the Town & Country Club, London, May 1988; taken from the Forever Remain

=== Bonus Disc (strictly limited edition) ===
1. "From the Fire" (radio edit) – 3:47
2. "Love Under Will" (live) – 6:10
3. "Laura" (live) – 5:48
