= Dawnrazor =

Studio album by Fields of the Nephilim
- Released: 4 May 1987
- Recorded: The Lodge, Suffolk, February 1987
- Genre: Gothic rock
- Length: 59:15
- Label: Situation Two
- Producer: Bill Buchanan

Fields of the Nephilim chronology
Dawnrazor (1987)	The Nephilim (1988)

Singles from Dawnrazor

Dawnrazor is the debut studio album by English gothic rock band Fields of the Nephilim. It was released on 4 May 1987, through record label Situation Two.

== Background ==
The introductory track contains a sample of the Ennio Morricone theme "Man with the Harmonica" from Sergio Leone's epic 1968 western film Once Upon a Time in the West.

== Critical reception ==
Professional ratings
Review scores
Source	Rating
AllMusic	3/5 stars
Pitchfork	7.4/10
Kerrang!	5/5 stars 3.5/5 stars

Dawnrazor was generally well-received, though the band and the album were often criticised for the perceived similarity to the work of the British gothic rock band The Sisters of Mercy. Trouser Press called it "an enjoyable creation, with some great songs [...], but the Sisters' influence is so strong that it tends to overshadow the Nephs' unique qualities." Dave Dickson of the British music magazine Kerrang! praises the band for the concept of "Spaghetti-metal", inspired by the characters portrayed on the screen by Clint Eastwood, but he is less warm on the execution, starting with "the plagiarising of the master musician of Spaghetti Western, Ennio Morricone" and the "truck loads of effects" used to recreate the atmosphere of the movies. For these reasons, he gave the album two different scores.

== Track listing ==
All tracks by Fields of the Nephilim, except "Intro" by Ennio Morricone

UK LP track
No.	Title	Length
1.	"Intro (The Harmonica Man)"	2:00
2.	"Slow Kill"	3:45
3.	"Volcane (Mr. Jealousy Has Returned)"	5:04
4.	"Vet for the Insane"	7:03
5.	"Dust"	4:22
6.	"Reanimator"	2:58
7.	"Dawnrazor"	7:10
8.	"The Sequel"	3:16

US LP track
No.	Title	Length
1.	"Intro (The Harmonica Man)"	2:00
2.	"Slow Kill"	3:45
3.	"Preacher Man"	4:53
4.	"Volcane (Mr. Jealousy Has Returned)"	5:04
5.	"Vet for the Insane"	7:03
6.	"Dust"	4:22
7.	"Power"	4:39
8.	"Blue Water"	5:51
9.	"Dawnrazor"	3:16
10.	"The Sequel"	3:16

US LP has added "Preacher Man", "Power" and "Blue Water" singles but misses "Reanimator".

CD track
No.	Title	Length
1.	"Intro (The Harmonica Man)"	2:00
2.	"Slow Kill"	3:45
3.	"Laura II"	4:41
4.	"Preacher Man"	4:53
5.	"Volcane (Mr. Jealousy Has Returned)"	5:04
6.	"Vet for the Insane"	7:03
7.	"Secrets"	3:37
8.	"Dust"	4:22
9.	"Reanimator"	2:58
10.	"Power"	4:39
11.	"The Tower"	5:41
12.	"Dawnrazor"	7:10
13.	"The Sequel"	3:16
Total length:		59:15

CD version has "Preacher Man" + 4 tracks from Italian "Returning to Gehenna EP" excluding title track but misses "Blue Water" which is available on "Revelations" compilation.

== Personnel ==
Fields of the Nephilim

- Carl McCoy – vocals
- Peter Yates – guitar
- Paul Wright – guitar
- Tony Pettitt – bass
- Alexander Wright – drums

Production

- Bill Buchanan – producer
- Iain O'Higgins – producer on "Secrets", "Power" and "The Tower"
- Fields of the Nephilim – producers on "Laura II", "Secrets", "Power" and "The Tower"
- Martin Stansfield, Stephen Stewart – engineers
- John Fryer – mixing
- Vic Maile – mixing on "Power"
- Greg Copeland, Richard Stanley, Justin Thomas – photography
