= Trench Crusade =

Miniature wargame and horror setting

- Designers: Mike Franchina; Tuomas Pirinen; James Sherriff
- Illustrators: Mike Franchina
- Publishers: Factory Fortress Inc.
- Publication: 2025 (1.0.0)
- Years active: 2023–present
- Genres: Skirmish-sized miniature wargame
- Languages: English, French
- Players: 2+
- Age range: Mature Audiences
- Latest version: 1.0.2
- Website: https://www.trenchcrusade.com

Trench Crusade (stylized in all caps) is a miniature wargame and grimdark horror setting. The game uses 32 mm scale miniatures, and can be played using "whichever miniatures bring [the players'] vision to life".

== Setting ==
Trench Crusade is set in an alternate history that diverges from real history in the late 11th century. After the First Crusade's successful capture of Jerusalem, members of the Knights Templar (Note: Within the setting the Knights Templar are founded in 1072, rather than their real-world founding in 1118.) committed "the Act of Ultimate Heresy", opening a gateway to Hell. Jerusalem was destroyed and the forces of Hell soon conquered most of the Levant.

The game takes place in the year 1914, after more than 800 years of conflict. The forces of Hell have conquered one third of humanity, including large parts of the Middle East, North Africa, Anatolia, the Caucasus, and the Balkans, with footholds in Northern Italy, Gibraltar, Cordoba, Avignon, and Finland. The armies are at a stalemate, with both sides now engaged in trench warfare. The area between the forces of Heaven and Hell is a no man's land, in which small warbands from both sides conduct missions to gather intelligence, find artifacts and relics, search for enemy scouts, assassinate high-value targets, and capture prisoners.

== Factions ==
The setting features several factions on both sides of the war, most with optional variants. Factory Fortress, Inc. has also partnered with third-parties to create licensed variants.

Factions and variants of Trench Crusade
The Faithful
Faction	Variants	Theme
The Principality of New Antioch	The Principality of New Antioch	Crusaders, Crusader states, World War I
The Principality of New Antioch	Papal States Intervention Force	Papal States, Swiss Guard
The Principality of New Antioch	Éire Rangers	Éire (Ireland)
The Principality of New Antioch	Kingdom of Alba Assault Detachment	Alba (Scotland)
The Principality of New Antioch	Stosstruppen of the Free State of Prussia	Prussia
The Principality of New Antioch	Expeditionary Forces of Abyssinia	Abyssinia (Ethiopia)
The Principality of New Antioch	The Red Brigade (by Westfalia Miniatures)	Suicide missions
Trench Pilgrims	Trench Pilgrims	Popular crusades
Trench Pilgrims	Procession of the Sacred Affliction	Close combat, Leprosy
Trench Pilgrims	War Pilgrimage of Saint Methodius	Anchorites, power armor
Trench Pilgrims	Cavalcade of the Tenth Plague	Animal sacrifice, ritual slaughter
The Sultanate of the Iron Wall	Iron Sultanate	Islamic Caliphate
The Sultanate of the Iron Wall	Fida’i of Alamut – The Cabal of Assassins	Order of Assassins
The Sultanate of the Iron Wall	The House of Wisdom	Alchemy, House of Wisdom
The Sultanate of the Iron Wall	Defenders of the Iron Wall	Siege warfare
The Fallen
Faction	Variants	Theme
Heretic Legions	Heretic Legions	Satanism, World War I
Heretic Legions	Trench Ghosts	Undead
Heretic Legions	Knights of Avarice	Greed
Heretic Legions	Naval Raiding Party	Marines
The Cult of the Black Grail	The Cult of the Black Grail	The Black Death, Beelzebub
The Cult of the Black Grail	Dirge of the Great Hegemon	Mourning
The Cult of the Black Grail	The Great Hunger (by Creature Caster)	Disease outbreaks, environmental reservoirs
The Court of the Seven-Headed Serpent		Demons, the seven deadly sins

== Gameplay ==
Trench Crusade is typically played between two players. Each player fields a warband of around 6–20 miniature models. The goal is to score more Victory Points than the opposing player by completing scenario objectives and Glorious Deeds. Alternatively, either warband may lose the game by failing a Morale Check.

Play takes place on a battlefield, typically a 3–4 foot square table or a similar surface, filled with miniature terrain to act as cover, obstacles and elevation. Players set up the battlefield and deploy their models according to the chosen scenario, usually in zones on opposing sides of the battlefield.

Combat is played in game turns. At the beginning of each turn, the player with fewer models gains the Initiative, with ties being resolved by dice roll. The player with the Initiative influences the order in which events resolve during that turn, including which player activates a model first.

During each turn, players alternately activate their models, allowing them to take actions such as moving, dashing, shooting, fighting in melee, performing situational actions and using special abilities. Each action may be performed once per activation. Many actions require a Success Roll to complete, where the player rolls a number of six-sided dice and must roll a sum of at least 7 on two of the dice to succeed. Various circumstances add positive and negative dice to the roll, with net positive rolls using the highest two dice and net negative rolls using the lowest two dice for the result. Some Success Rolls are Risky and will end the model's activation if failed.

Trench Crusade does not use a traditional hit point system. Instead, successful attacks and other harmful situations trigger an Injury Roll, where a player rolls a number of six-sided dice and sums the result from two of them. Depending on the result of the Injury Roll, a model may gain Blood Markers, be taken Down (a vulnerable state), or immediately taken Out of Action (removed from play). Blood Markers may be spent by an opposing player to add negative dice to a marked model's Success Rolls, or add more dice to an Injury Roll against that model. A model can have up to six Blood Markers; six Blood Markers (or three on a model that has been taken Down) may be spent to trigger a Bloodbath on an Injury Roll, adding one more die to the summed result. Therefore, even low-value models have a chance to take down or defeat high-value models with every attack.

After all models have been activated, any warband which has half of its models taken Down or Out of Action must roll a Morale Check. Failing a Morale Check may cause a warband to become Shaken for one turn (causing all Success Rolls to become Risky), or flee the battlefield (by choice, or by force if they were already Shaken). Otherwise, play continues to the next turn. Each scenario defines end states and scoring rules. Typically, a game ends after certain number of turns or the completion of an objective.

Games may be played as "one-off" standalone games, or as part of a series within a campaign played by a larger group of players. In campaign play, players track their warband's accomplishments and defeats, and roll dice to resolve narrative events occurring between battles. Warbands accumulate currency, experience and Glory Points to spend on additional recruits and upgrades, while models taken Out of Action may be permanently killed or injured. Campaign games reward Campaign Victory Points based on wins, losses and draws. A player wins a campaign by earning the most Campaign Victory Points among the participants across a number of games.

== Development ==
Trench Crusade is a collaboration between horror artist Mike Franchina, sculptor James Sherriff, and designer Tuomas Pirinen. Franchina has previously worked on Magic: The Gathering, Diablo IV, and Path of Exile, while Pirinen was the lead designer for Mordheim, part of Warhammer Fantasy Battles. The setting was conceived by Franchina in 2016, which was primarily explored through his art and written lore. In August 2022, Franchina and Sherriff collaborated to produce a range of Trench Crusade miniatures, backed by a Kickstarter.

After the success of the initial models being crowdfunded, Pirinen announced in May 2023 that he was working with Franchina to adapt the setting into a tabletop miniature wargame. A preview of the rules was released by Pirinen in June 2023. Version 1.0.0 was released on November 4th, 2025, followed by update 1.0.1 on November 20th, 2025 and update 1.0.2 on February 12th, 2026. Rules updates act as erratum, while biannual rules reviews will aim to make the game more enjoyable and balanced.

In November 2025, Factory Fortress, Inc. announced plans to transition from 3D printed miniatures to injection-molded plastic model kits.
