= The Nefilim =

British metal band

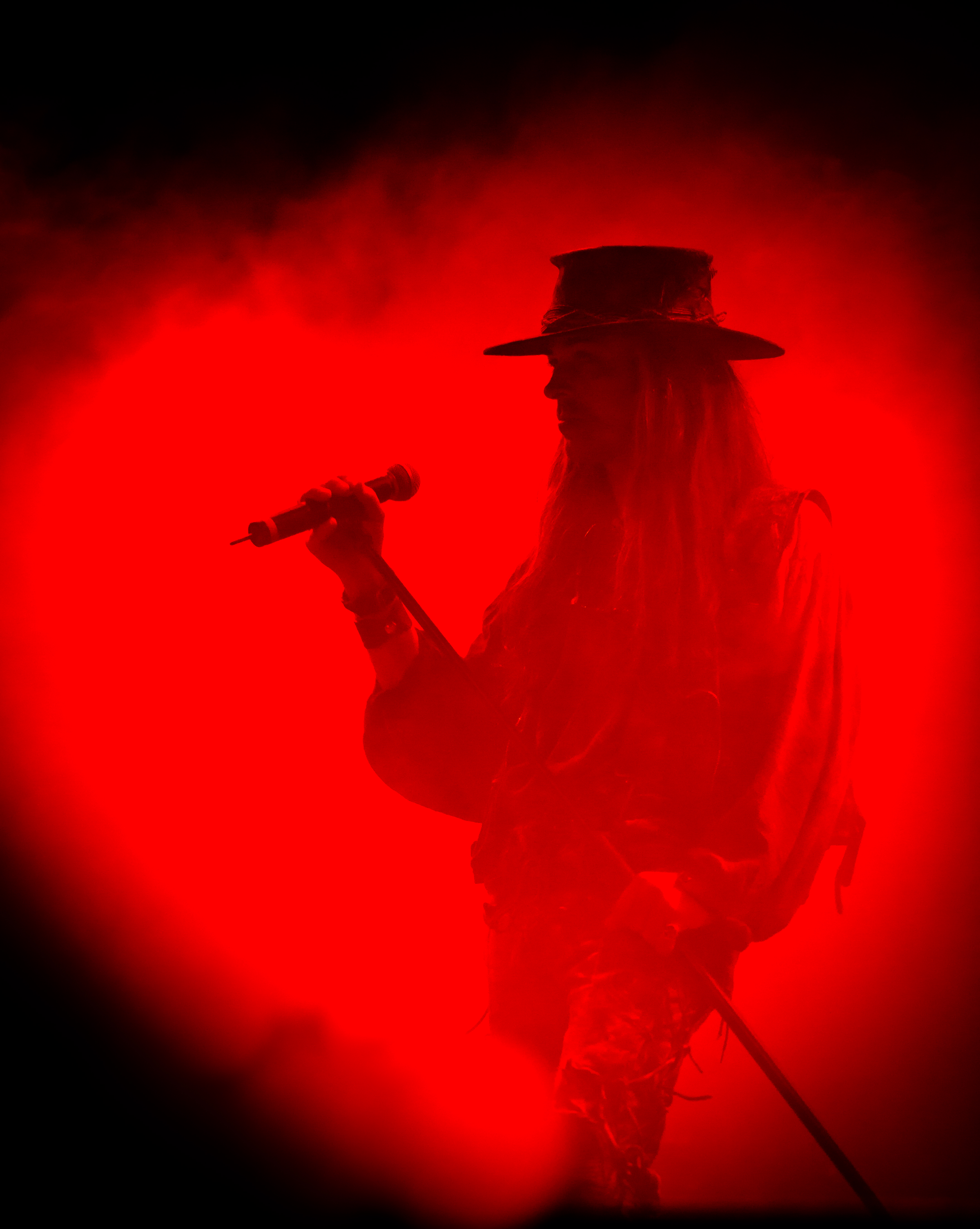
- Vocalist Carl McCoy

Background information
- Origin: United Kingdom
- Genres: Gothic metal; industrial death metal
- Years active: 1992–1996
- Label: Beggars Banquet
- Spinoff of: Fields of the Nephilim
- Past members: Carl McCoy; Paul Miles; Cian Houchin; Simon Rippin; John Carter

The Nefilim was a gothic metal studio project formed by Carl McCoy in 1992 after the disbanding of Fields of the Nephilim. It featured McCoy on vocals and keyboards and John "Capachino" Carter on bass, guitars and drums. The album title track "Zoon" was written during this period, as were demos including "Red Harvest777", "Chaocracy" and "Subsanity (Sensorium)". Chaocracy was released on the 1993 compilation album Deafening Divinities With Aural Affinities - The Beggars Banquet Collection. After a year Carter and McCoy parted company, and McCoy went on to recruit Paul Miles on guitar, Simon Rippin on drums and Cian Houchin on bass.

The lineup released one album, Zoon (1996), which was more influenced by death metal and industrial metal than McCoy's previous releases with the Fields of the Nephilim, though similar themes of mysticism are prevalent, seen in songs like "Pazuzu (Black Rain)", which refers to the Assyro-Babylonian god also known as "king of the demons".

Simon Rippin and Paul Miles would go on to form Sensorium. Both also performed in the 2000 Fields of the Nephilim lineup

Cian Houchin has performed and recorded albums as the frontman for Saints of Eden.

John Carter would later collaborate with McCoy on the 2005 Fields of the Nephilim album Mourning Sun and play bass in the 2007-2008 Fields of the Nephilim lineup.

== Members ==
- Carl McCoy – vocals, keyboards (1992–1996)
- Paul Miles – guitar (1992–1996)
- Simon Rippin – drums (1993–1996)
- Cian Houchin – bass (1993–1996)
- John "Capachino" Carter – bass, guitars and drums (1992–1993)

== Discography ==
=== Zoon (1996) ===
Zoon

Studio album by Nefilim
- Released: 22 April 1996
- Genres: Gothic metal; industrial death metal
- Length: 53:17
- Label: Beggars Banquet
- Producer: Carl McCoy

Singles from Zoon
- 1. "Xodus" Released: 1995; 2. "Penetration" Released: 1 April 1996

Professional ratings
Review scores
Source	Rating
AllMusic	3/5 stars

Zoon, Nefilim's only studio album, was released in April 1996 by Beggars Banquet Records (Catalogue number BEGA172). The album saw a move away from the rich soundscapes that characterised earlier works from Fields of the Nephilim towards a darker, more industrial/death metal sound. McCoy has stated that the album was in development hell for several years, due to restrictions from the record label. The album is dedicated to Scarlett McCoy, Carl McCoy's daughter.

The album is a concept album, and while McCoy remained largely silent about the themes, one possible explanation is that the story revolves around the Watchers and the Book of Enoch. The word "zoon" is derived from Greek, meaning "living creature" or "beast".

==== Track listing ====
1. "Still Life"
2. "Xodus"
3. "Shine"
4. "Penetration"
5. "Melt (The Catching of the Butterfly)"
6. "Venus Decomposing"
7. "Pazuzu (Black Rain)"
8. "Zoon, Parts 1 & 2: Saturation"
9. "Zoon, Part 3: Wake World"
10. "Coma"

=== Singles ===
- Xodus (1995)
- Penetration (1996)

Beggars Banquet Records would reissue an expanded version of Zoon on 13th December 2024 (Catalogue number BBQ-2655). The expanded edition of Zoon is available on 2XLP, CD and digital. Four bonus tracks have been added to all formats.
