= Mourning Sun =

Studio album by Fields of the Nephilim
- Released: 28 November 2005
- Recorded: 2002–2005
- Genres: Gothic rock; gothic metal
- Label: SPV
- Producer: Carl McCoy

Fields of the Nephilim chronology
Fallen (2002)	Mourning Sun (2005)

Mourning Sun, released on 28 November 2005, is the fourth studio album by English gothic rock band Fields of the Nephilim. Vocalist Carl McCoy is the only original band member to be featured on this album and is the band's first studio album since Elizium which was released on 24 September 1990.

== Background ==
McCoy along with John "Capachino" Carter (original Nefilim collaborator) spent eighteen months recording new demos in McCoy's mobile recording studio, dubbed "The Ice Cage" which took them to various places, including Norway. According to McCoy, Ice Cage sessions generated enough material for a double album, yet it was ultimately decided to narrow the track listing down to one disc.

While McCoy has suggested that additional musicians were recruited for the recording process, the only identified persons involved in the writing and recording process to date are John "Capachino" Carter (a musician who also worked with McCoy on Zoon demos in the beginning of the 1990s) and McCoy's daughters Scarlett and Eden on backing vocals for the title track. McCoy has admitted to having applied preprogrammed drums on some of the tracks, stressing at the same time that most of the drum parts "were created by a real human being - Carter."

== Track listing ==
Morning Sun
No.	Title	Length
1.	"Shroud (Exordium)"	5:44
2.	"Straight to the Light"	6:24
3.	"New Gold Dawn"	7:58
4.	"Requiem (Le Veilleur silencieux)"	7:21
5.	"Xiberia (Seasons in the Ice Cage)"	7:33
6.	"She"	9:26
7.	"Mourning Sun"	10:35
8.	"In the Year 2525" (bonus item available only on the limited edition of the album)	9:28
Total length:		63:09

== Reception ==
Professional ratings
Review scores
Source	Rating
Allmusic	3.5/5 stars
Kerrang!	3/5 stars
Maelstrom Zine	7/10 stars
Release Magazine	8/10 stars
Tartarean Desire	8/10 stars

Reception to the new album was generally positive, with NME listing six of the album's tracks amongst their Top 10 for the band's best songs to date.

== Personnel ==
- Carl McCoy - vocals, programming, producer
- John "Capachino" Carter - bass guitar, guitars, drums, keys & backing vocals
- Scarlett McCoy - backing vocals on "Mourning Sun"
- Eden McCoy - backing vocals on "Mourning Sun"
