= Fields of the Nephilim =

British gothic rock band

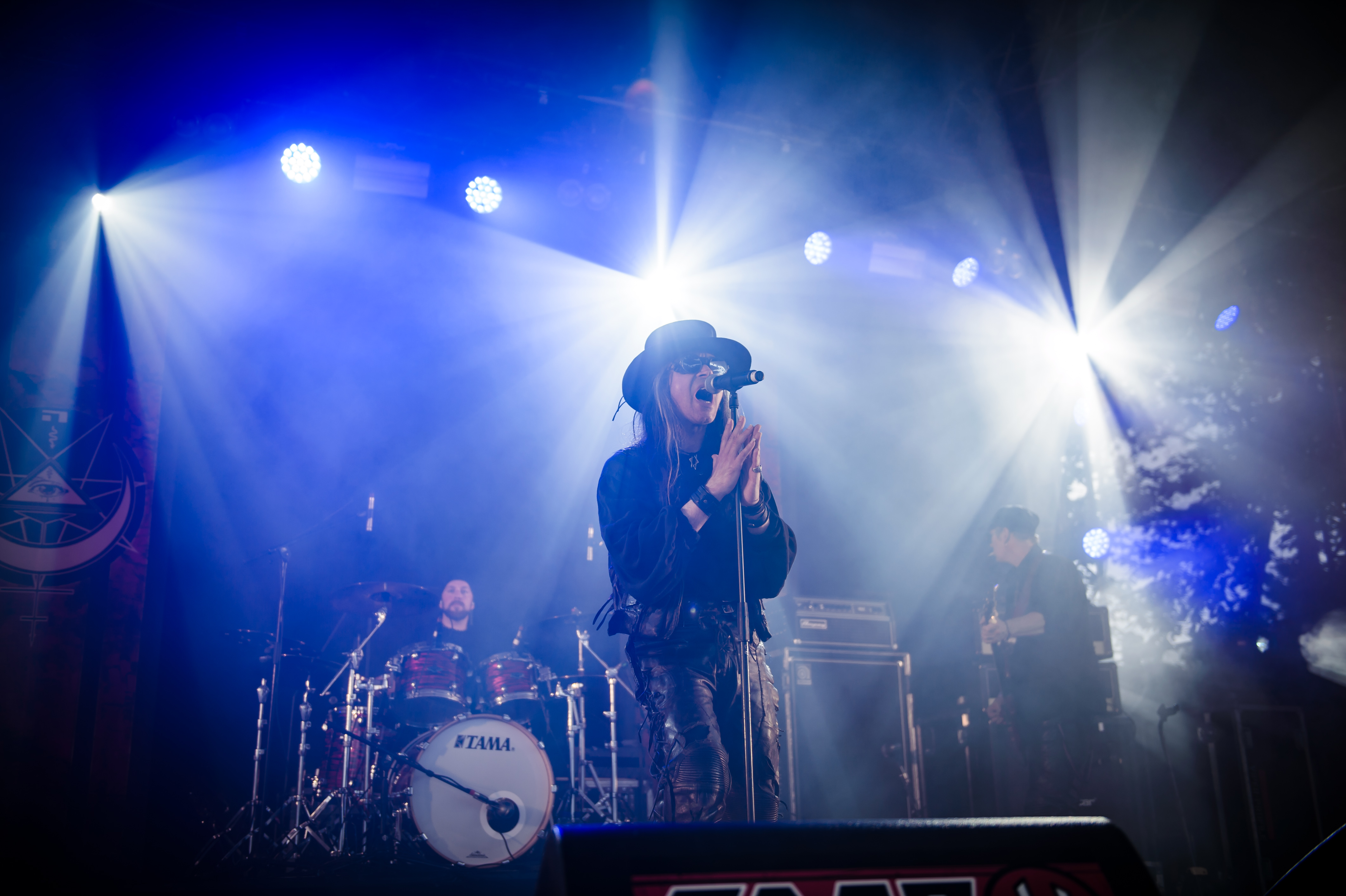
- Fields of the Nephilim performing live in 2017

Background information
- Origin: Stevenage, Hertfordshire, England
- Genres: Gothic rock; gothic metal
- Years active: 1984–1991, 1998–present
- Labels: Jungle Records; Situation Two; Beggars Banquet; SPV; EMI
- Spinoffs: Rubicon; Nefilim; Last Rites
- Members: Carl McCoy; Gav King; Adam Leach; Tony Pettitt
- Past members: Gary Wisker; Peter Yates; Alexander 'Nod' Wright; Paul Wright; John 'Capachino' Carter

Fields of the Nephilim are an English gothic rock band formed in Stevenage, Hertfordshire, in 1984. The band's name refers to a biblical race of angel-human hybrids known as the Nephilim and the magnetic fields around the Earth.

== Career ==
=== Early years (1984–1991) ===
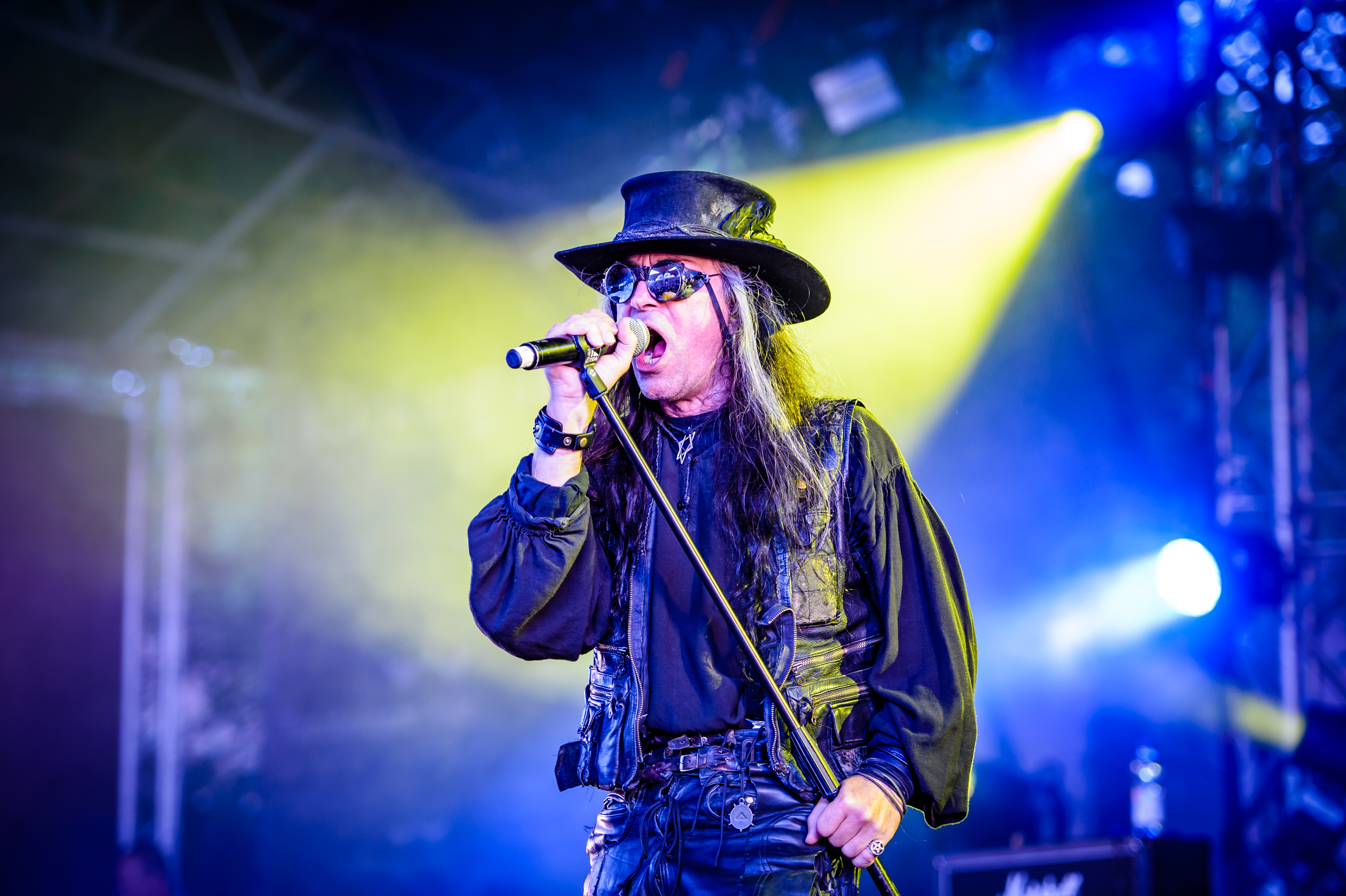
Vocalist Carl McCoy performing in 2017

The band's debut 12" EP, Burning the Fields, was first released in 1985 on their own Tower Release label and was quickly picked up by Jungle Records, who put them in the studio for further recordings that became the Returning to Gehenna 12" EP. Managed by a Jungle Records director, they were soon signed to Situation 2 records (an imprint of Beggars Banquet Records) in 1986 to release "Power" and "Preacher Man", and their first album, Dawnrazor, which topped the Indie chart in 1987. The next release, "Blue Water", was the first Fields of the Nephilim single to reach the UK Singles Chart (number 75). It was followed by "Moonchild", the lead single from the second LP The Nephilim, which reached number 28 in the UK chart.

Psychonaut was released in May 1989 and peaked at number 35; the ten-minute track indicated a slight shift for the band toward a more experimental and intense sound. This single/EP was a precursor to the polished and highly produced Elizium album (1990), for which they "upgraded" to the Beggars Banquet label. Produced by Pink Floyd / David Gilmour engineer Andy Jackson (taking over from previous band producer Bill Buchanan), the album was preceded by the single "For Her Light," which clipped the British Top 40 in its first week of release. A remixed version of "Sumerland (Dreamed)" (this version is on the CD single only and differed from the 7" vinyl format of the same release), released in November 1990, peaked at number 37.

In 1991, the band played their final gigs, a two-day 'Festival of Fire' in the Town & Country Club London. The final releases of this era are the live CD Earth Inferno and the video Visionary Heads, followed by the compilation Revelations.

=== Departure of McCoy and hiatus (1991–1998) ===
Frontman McCoy left the band in 1991. The remaining members, together with singer Andy Delaney, chose not to continue with the "Fields of the Nephilim" name and instead recorded under the name Rubicon. The band released two albums before disbanding: What Starts, Ends in 1992 and Room 101 in 1995.

Meanwhile, Carl McCoy formed a new project called Nefilim in 1991, after the disbanding of Fields of the Nephilim.

The band played some gigs in 1993, showcasing new material. According to McCoy, the release of their debut album, Zoon, was delayed for several years due to disagreements with the record label. Zoon was eventually released in 1996 and featured a distinctly heavier sound than McCoy's previous works.

=== Reunion and Fallen (1998–2002) ===
On 15 August 1998, McCoy and original bassist Tony Pettitt held a press conference at the Zillo Festival in Germany, announcing their future plans to collaborate under two separate monikers, Fields of the Nephilim (along with the Wright brothers) and the Nefilim (an altered spelling of McCoy's solo project).

According to different original band members, the band was rehearsing and writing the next Fields of the Nephilim album (with the exception of Yates). However, the anticipated reunion of the original band line-up never happened.

In May 2000, McCoy and Pettitt released "One More Nightmare (Trees Come Down)", the first Fields of the Nephilim single with their new (and original) label, Jungle Records. It contained newly worked versions of "Trees Come Down" and "Darkcell", both originally released on the Burning the Fields EP in 1984. Between June and August 2000, the band made four live appearances at European festivals: Woodstage, Eurorock, Roskilde, and M'era Luna music festivals.

In 2002, Jungle Records (and licensees including Metropolis Records in the U.S. and SPV in Germany) released the album Fallen. The release was claimed to be unauthorized by the band and consists of recordings from 1997–2001, the 2000 reworkings of "Trees Come Down" and "Darkcell", and a previously unreleased demo by the Nefilim. The release has been disowned by the band, and only one song from it, "From the Fire", has been performed live.

=== Mourning Sun and Ceromonies (2005–2014) ===
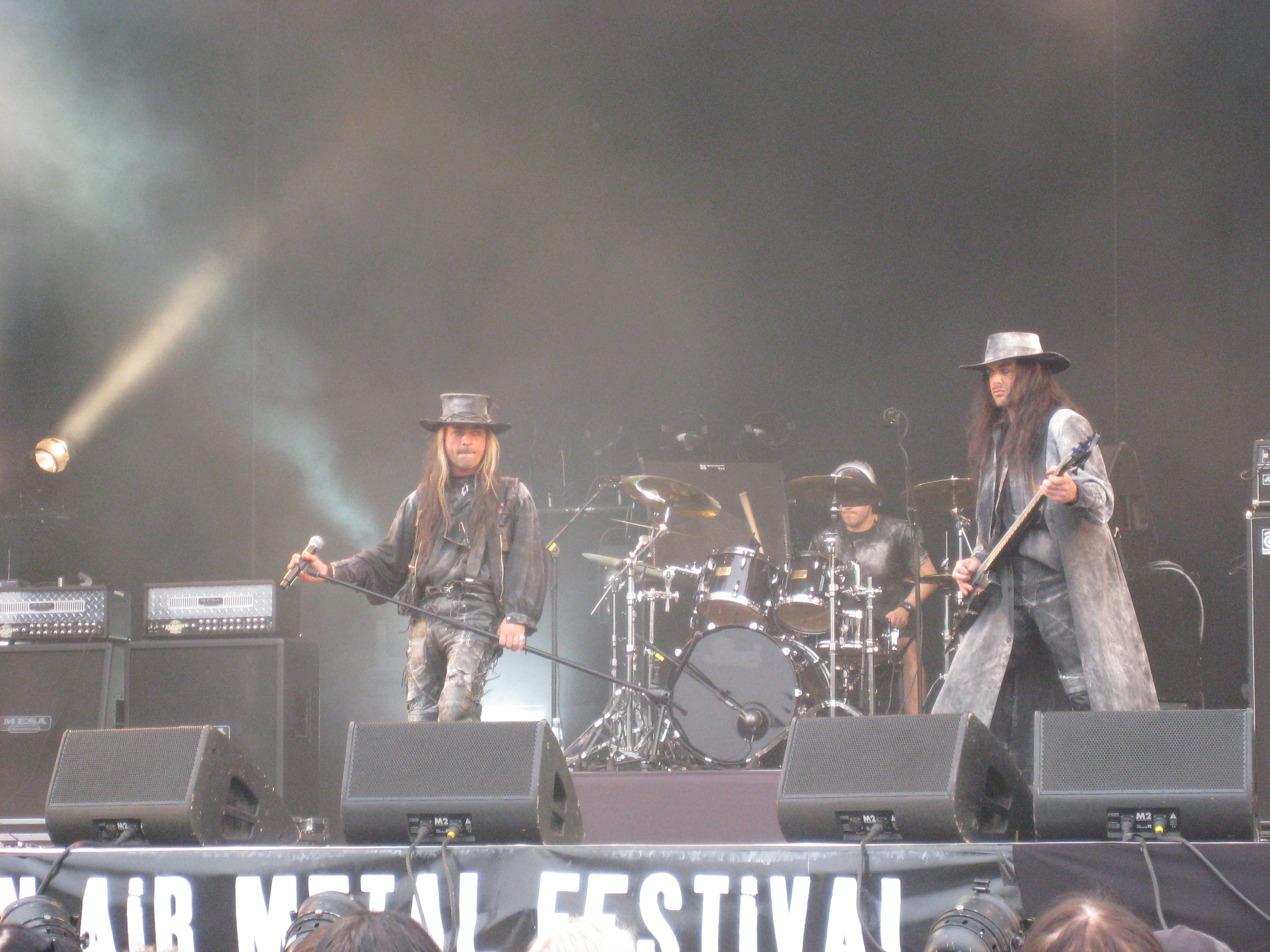
McCoy (left) and Carter (right) at Tuska festival 2008

Fifteen years after Elizium, McCoy released Mourning Sun, his fourth full-length studio album under the name Fields of the Nephilim. The album had seven original songs, with a cover version of Zager and Evans's "In the Year 2525" included as a bonus track on the first 5,000 copies.

In interviews following the release of the album Mourning Sun, McCoy mentioned collaborating with ghost musicians, but only John "Capachino" Carter is officially credited on the album.

In 2006, some European venues announced that a tour was to take place, although this was never officially confirmed. In spite of high ticket sales, none of the gigs occurred. Through the band's official website, McCoy emphasized that he had not confirmed these dates with promoters or venues, and reiterated that people should not buy tickets for such events until official announcements through the band's website confirmed that such live performances were to go ahead.

In May 2007, McCoy performed as Fields of the Nephilim for the first time in seven years, at the London Astoria with a lineup consisting of Gavin King, Lee Newell, Gizz Butt and Steve Fox-Harris. According to the band's website, the event was filmed by video director Richard Stanley, who had directed videos for the original band's singles; however, due to quality issues with the audio recording and filming, it was abandoned.

Ceromonies (Ad Mortem Ad Vitam) was a two-night event sponsored by Metal Hammer magazine in which the band played material spanning their career. Performed at London's O2 Shepherd's Bush Empire, the band performed to sell-out crowds. The 'Ceromonies' line-up for this event that featured on the live album and DVD was McCoy, King, Newell, Edwards, and Carter. Highlights of this period included the band's biggest-ever headline show to date at the 2008 M'era Luna Festival, where the 'Ceromonies' line-up performed in front of over 23,000 people. The encore from this show, "Last Exit for the Lost," was also included on the Ceromonies release.

In June 2008, a DVD entitled Live in Düsseldorf 1991 was released on Cherry Red.

On 16 April 2012 Sacred Symphony released the DVD and double CD box set as well as a double LP vinyl version of Ceromonies (Ad Mortem Ad Vitam), consisting of recordings and footage from the 2008 concerts. The vinyl version does not come with the live DVD. It was also released as a collectible box set coming in a wooden box with the Ceromonies logo and title branded on the wooden lid.

On 25 Nov 2013 Beggars Archive released a 5 Album Boxset on CD (BBQCD2108) collecting the band's first three studio albums (1987′s 'Dawnrazor', 1988′s 'The Nephilim', 1990′s 'Elizium'), with bonus tracks, along with the 1991 live album 'Earth Inferno' and a new 13-track collection of singles and remixes.

=== 2014–present ===
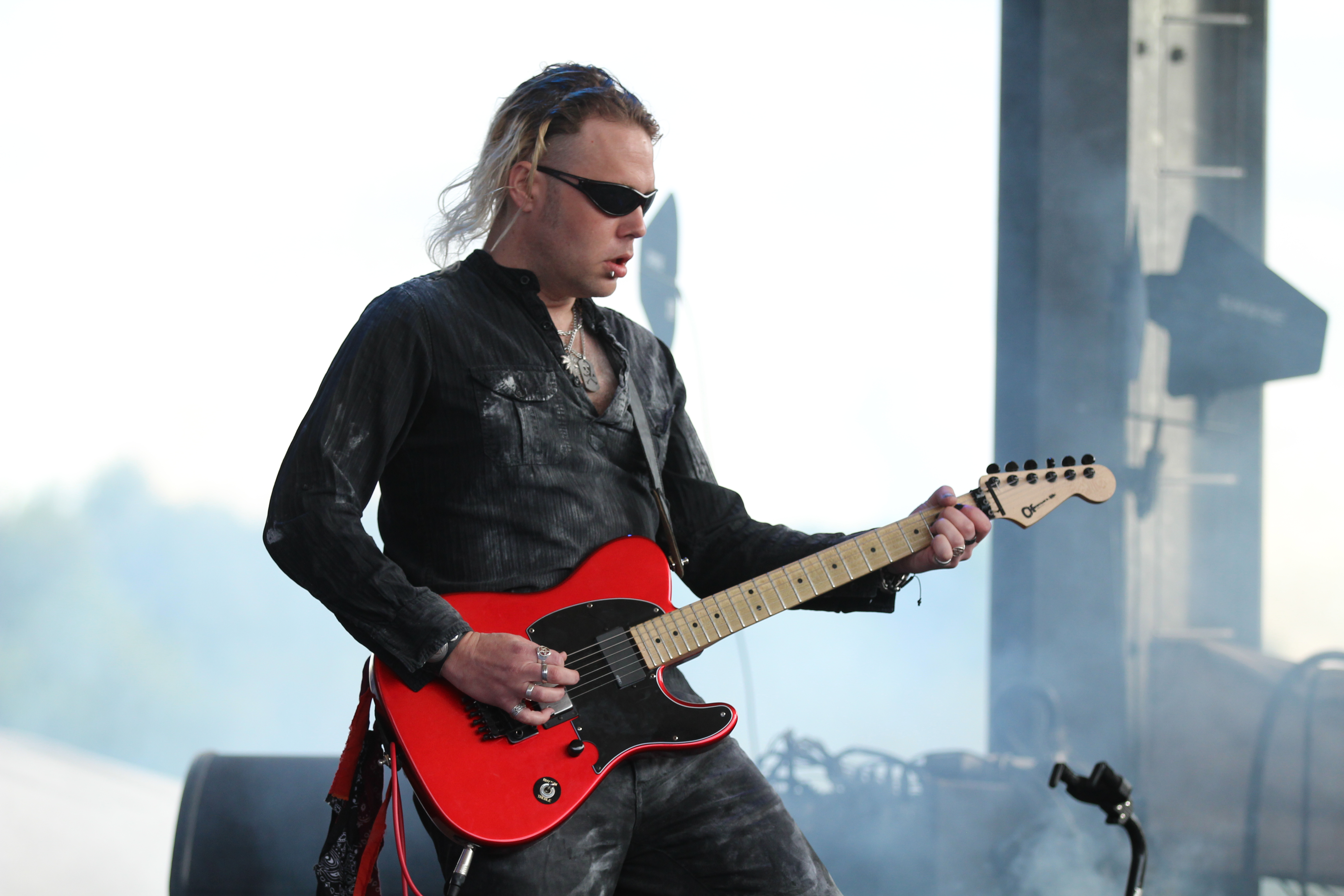
Tom Edwards performing in 2014

On 1 July 2014, Carl McCoy announced that the band was back in the studio "...recording and compiling the most important elements created and gathered." In December 2014, the band debuted two new songs live onstage, "Earthbound" and "Prophecy". "Prophecy" was produced, engineered, and mixed by Carl McCoy and mastered by Maor Appelbaum. The single was released as a 7" vinyl single and as an online single on Sacred Symphony, McCoy's own label, available only as a download on iTunes on 17 March 2016. It was promoted as a band single that featured Newell & King but did not feature original bassist Pettitt.

Tom Edwards died in 2017 from heart failure while touring in the US with Adam Ant.

Drummer Lee Newell announced that he quit the band, citing personal reasons regarding a move to the US.

M'era Luna organizers announced in July 2023 via social media that Fields of the Nephilim would not be performing at that year’s festival.

Beggars Archive have re-released The Nephilim (Catalogue number BBQ-2380-LP), pressed on golden brown vinyl and expanded to a double LP with 3 bonus tracks released 20 October 2023. A 30th anniversary red vinyl reissue of Elizium (Catalogue number BBQ2537) remastered via analogue transfer to 96khz/24 bit by John Dent at Loud, with vinyl mastering by Geoff Pesche at Abbey Road including 4 bonus tracks on 5 April 2024. They also reissued a 2025 remaster of Dawnrazor on 12th December 2025 (Catalogue number BBQ2702) This definitive version released on 2XLP, CD and digital includes all 14 album tracks on vinyl for the first time and together on CD for the first time since the five album box set released in 2013.

== Musical style and imagery ==
Fields of the Nephilim's initial sound incorporated elements of hard rock, gothic rock, heavy metal, and psychedelic rock, and comprised a bass- and guitar-driven sound underpinned by McCoy's growled vocals. Lyrically, the band incorporated themes concerning magic (specifically chaos magic), the Cthulhu Mythos, the Sumerian religion, and the works of Aleister Crowley.

Bassist Tony Pettitt cited musical influences including Bauhaus, Siouxsie and the Banshees, Roxy Music, David Bowie, Lee "Scratch" Perry, Joy Division, the Velvet Underground and dub reggae. McCoy has described the band's sound as "like Pink Floyd mixed with the Velvets and even with a touch of jazz thrown in."

The band had a "dust and death" image, associated with characters from Sergio Leone's Spaghetti Westerns and often wore cowboy dusters with a weather-beaten look during photoshoots. This weather-beaten look was attained by dusting themselves down with, by their own admission, Mother's Pride flour. This also proved problematic for the band as in May 1988, Nottinghamshire Police detained the band while a suspect substance was tested for drugs. This was later determined to be nothing but flour from the stage set.

== Legacy ==
The band's logo

In 2001, Nod and Paul Wright formed a new band, Last Rites. They released two full-length albums: Guided by Light (2001) and The Many Forms (2005).

Tony Pettitt was a member of The Eden House and NFD.

Fields of the Nephilim have been cited as an influence by musicians including Watain, Katatonia, Gatecreeper, Enslaved, Harald Nævdal of Immortal and Old Funeral, Nergal of Behemoth and Mille Petrozza of Kreator.

=== Parody ===
From 1988, during the band's period of mainstream attention following the release of Dawnrazor and Psychonaut, the music newspaper Melody Maker published various spoof articles about the band. This culminated in a regular feature called The Nod Corner, which purported to be written by Nephilim drummer Nod Wright and which took a satirical view of the band's baleful and dramatic image, usually portraying McCoy as a prima donna who exploited and bullied Nod. Wright appeared to take the spoof graciously.

== Members ==
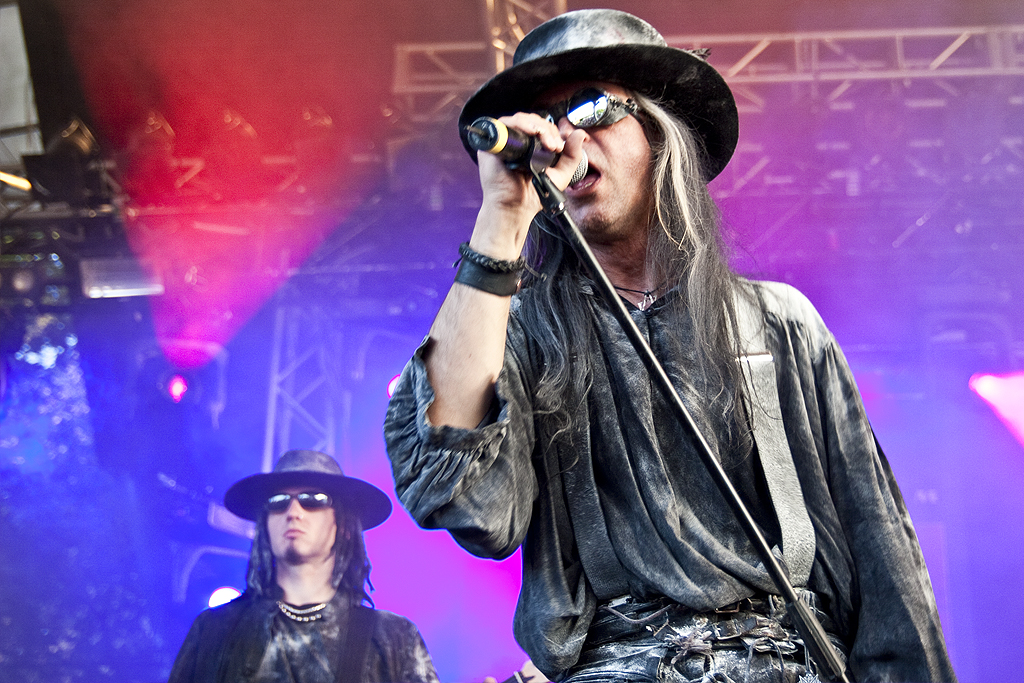
Gavin King (left) and Carl McCoy (right) in 2013

=== Current ===
- Carl McCoy – vocals (1984–present)
- Gavin King – guitar (2007–present)
- Tony Pettitt – bass (1984–1991, 1998–2000, 2013–present)
- Adam Leach – guitar (2018–present)

=== Former ===
- Gary Wisker – saxophone (1984–1985)
- Peter Yates – guitar (1985–1991)
- Paul Wright – guitar (1984–1991, 1998–2000)
- Alexander "Nod" Wright – drums (1984–1991, 1998–2000)
- John "Capachino" Carter – bass (drums/guitars/keys/vocals – studio) (2000–2009)
- Tom Edwards – guitar (2008–2016, deceased)
- Lee Newell – drums (2007–2023)

=== Live ===
- Paul Miles - guitar (2000)
- Simon Rippin - drums (2000)
- Steve 'Fox' Harris - guitar (2007)
- Gizz Butt - guitar (2007)
- Tim 'Snake' Slade - bass (2009-2012)
- Andy James – guitar (2012-2014)

== Discography ==
- Dawnrazor (1987)
- The Nephilim (1988)
- Elizium (1990)
- Earth Inferno (1991)
- Mourning Sun (2005)
- Ceromonies (2012)
