= Son of Angels =

Novel series by Jerel Law

- Spirit Fighter, Fire Prophet, Shadow Chaser
- Author: Jerel Law
- Country: United States
- Language: English
- Genre: Young adult novel, Christian fiction
- Publisher: Thomas Nelson
- Published: April 3, 2012
- Media type: Print (Paperback), audiobook, e-book

Son of Angels is a series of young adult Christian fiction novels by Jerel Law. The first book in the series, Spirit Fighter, was released on April 3, 2012, through Thomas Nelson and the second, Fire Prophet, was released on December 11, 2012. The third book, Shadow Chaser was released on May 7, 2013. The fourth book, Truth Runner, was released on November 5, 2013.

Of the series, Law stated that he began writing the books as a way to "connect [his children] with the Bible in a relevant way for them" after noticing that there were not many books similar to the Percy Jackson and Harry Potter series.

== Synopsis ==
=== Spirit Fighter ===
The book starts with 13-year-old Jonah Stone getting up from bed and getting ready for the basketball tryouts. When he doesn't get in, he gets frustrated and prays. In frustration, Jonah kicks a soccer ball which ends up rocketing to the sky rather than going to the goal. When Jonah tells his dad about the incident, he tests his theory and later tells Jonah a fascinating family secret. His mom is 1/2 angel, which makes him and his siblings 1/4 angel.

When Jonah's mom is kidnapped by fallen angels, it is up to him and his sister Eliza to save her. With their special powers along the way, Jonah and Eliza have an adventure in New York that they would have never dreamed of before. They find their mom at Belvedere Castle with seven other 1/2 angels beside her. Jonah and Eliza use their powers to rescue them, but are caught by the fallen angels. Jonah, Eliza, and the rest of the Nephilim are about to be killed when Marduk, the commander of the fallen angels, stops them. He says that the "BOSS" doesn't want them killed. He wants them to be his servants. When Marduk is about to hypnotize Jonah's mom Eleanor, Jonah shoots an arrow at him to stop. Marduk grabs it, breaks it in half, and transports Jonah to a different place.

Marduk wants Jonah to bow down to him, but Jonah refuses to. Jonah runs up the stairs to the roof, where he gets caught by Marduk, again, who commands him to worship him and be his servant. When Jonah still refuses, Marduk pushes him out of the roof to die. Jonah gets rescued by Archangel Michael, who gives him an angel blade, the key source to fight fallen angels. Jonah returns to Belvedere Castle just in time before his mom gets hypnotized by Marduk. Jonah, Eliza, and Eleanor all defeat the fallen angels and free the Nephilim from Marduk's grasp.

=== Fire Prophet ===
One year ago, Jonah and Eliza Stone discovered that their mom was a 1/2 angel, a nephilim, which makes them and their little brother Jeremiah 1/4 angels, or quarterlings. After saving their mother and the other nephilims from the fallen angels, the Stone family enjoys some rest and relaxation. But when they are attacked by fallen angels at school, the Stone kids figure out that quarterlings all over the world are being targeted. They also learn why the fallen angels are doing this. Abaddon wants all of the quarterlings killed. The quarterlings are informed that the only way to keep them safe is to separate them from their parents. The kids undergo special training to help them discover their own unique angelic gifts, which come in handy when they embark on a mission to find a mysterious prophet who they believe holds the key to Abaddon's defeat in a massive battle between good and evil. When the prophet dies she leaves her multi-colored scarf behind, and tells Jonah that he is a prophet too.

=== Shadow Chaser ===
Many months have passed since part angel siblings Jonah, Eliza, and Jeremiah Stone began their angelic training. As part angels, or quarterlings, the siblings joined other children of nephilim to begin honing their special powers. In Shadow Chaser, Jonah's story comes to resemble a modern-day Job as he's faced with trials that affect his health, strength, relationships, and most-prized possessions. As he and the other quarterlings prepare for mid-term exams, their powers are tested once again in the most fierce battle against Abaddon's forces yet. Will Jonah's faith in Elohim continue to persevere as he fights Abaddon in his hardest battle yet?

=== Truth Runner ===
It has been a trying six months for Jonah, Eliza, and Jeremiah Stone. They have been grieving over the loss of their nephilim mother, who was murdered by Abaddon's forces. As part angels, the siblings have been in school with other children of nephilim to hone their special powers. Jonah has left Angel School and attempts to forget Elohim's calling by moving back to his hometown and starting high school as a “normal” kid. Jonah can still see fallen angels and the evil they're doing. When Jonah realizes the Fallen are attacking his friends without their knowledge, he is faced with a choice: continue to ignore it and forge his own path, or remember who he really is and fight for his friends.

== Characters ==
- Jonah Stone - Jonah Stone is the main character in the Son of Angels series. He is the first one of the Stone kids to discover that he was a Quarterling. Jonah Stone is a 13-year-old boy that, at first, feels that he's the only one in his family that is not good at anything. Also, his little brother and sister always humiliate Jonah. All that changes when he figures out he's 1/4 angel. He begins to be more confident about himself and becomes more closer to God.
- Eliza Stone - Eliza Stone is Jonah Stone's sister. She was the second of the Stone kids to discover she's a Quarterling. She joins Jonah in Spirit Fighter by helping him rescue their mom. Eliza Stone is 11-year-old girl who is very stubborn and gets frustrated easily. She also admits in Spirit Fighter that faith was not something she was really good at. Eliza also humiliates Jonah by being smarter than him. She's really scientific and can sometimes can get overboard by talking too much.
- Jeremiah Stone - Jeremiah Stone is Jonah and Eliza's little brother. He was the last one of the Stone family to discover that he was a quarterling. Jeremiah is a 7-year-old boy who is very energetic and loves his older siblings. He humiliates Jonah very easily and Jonah thinks of him as annoying. In Spirit Fighter, Jonah is embarrassed because he has to walk him to his 1st grade classroom.
- Marduk - Marduk is the main villain of the series and is the 2nd in command of the fallen angels. He is later revealed to be Victor Grace, Eleanor Stone's father. Marduk has a mean personality and has the ability to hypnotize people to be his "servants" and to rebel away from God. Like all of the fallen angels, he doesn't like it when people says God or Elohim, and screeches when he hears that.
- Henry - Henry is The Stone's Family's guardian angel that, at the end of Spirit Fighter, turns into a warrior-class angel. In Fire Prophet (Book 2), it is said that Henry was replaced with another guardian angel named Cassandra because he had some more work to do now that he was a warrior-class angel. Henry is an energetic guardian angel that is always caring for his friends and is really close to God. While sometimes he could be really fun to talk to, he gets serious when he's explaining about the scripture and bad things.
- Eleanor Stone - Eleanor Stone is Jonah, Eliza, and Jeremiah's mother. She is one of the 8 nephilims (1/2 angels) and was kidnapped by the fallen angels. Eleanor Stone is stubborn, like Eliza, and is very caring about her family. She is also very close to God and loves helping other people. When someone is picking on one of her kids, she wants to take action and tell the leaders of the place what happened. Jonah can get very annoyed by that. She dies in book 3.
- Benjamin Stone - Benjamin is a kind-hearted man who is married to Eleanor, and is Jonah, Eliza, and Jeremiah's father. He's also the pastor of All Souls’ United Methodist Church in Peacefield. It also turns out that he is the only one in the Stone household who is completely human. Despite that fact, he has unique gifts of his own, especially when it comes to helping people get rid of those pesky fallen angels. When he's not working at the church, he can usually be found in his study, buried in a tome of Hebrew literature.
- Camilla Aldridge - Camilla Aldridge is a long-time friend of the Stone family, and one of the oldest members of the church. She has always been wise in the ways of Elohim, and is like a kind grandmother to the Stone children. She is fond of saying, 'Things are not always as they seem.' This will prove to be true in many ways as this story unfolds.

== Reception ==
Publishers Weekly gave a positive review for the first novel Spirit Fighter, but slightly criticized the audiobook version's narrator for "[dipping] a little into caricature in his portrayals". Kirkus Reviews gave a mixed review for Fire Prophet, saying that Law made a "praiseworthy effort at gender and ethnic diversity" but that the "presentation of Christianity also gives short shrift to humble service or inner spirituality".
