= Danielle Trussoni =

American novelist

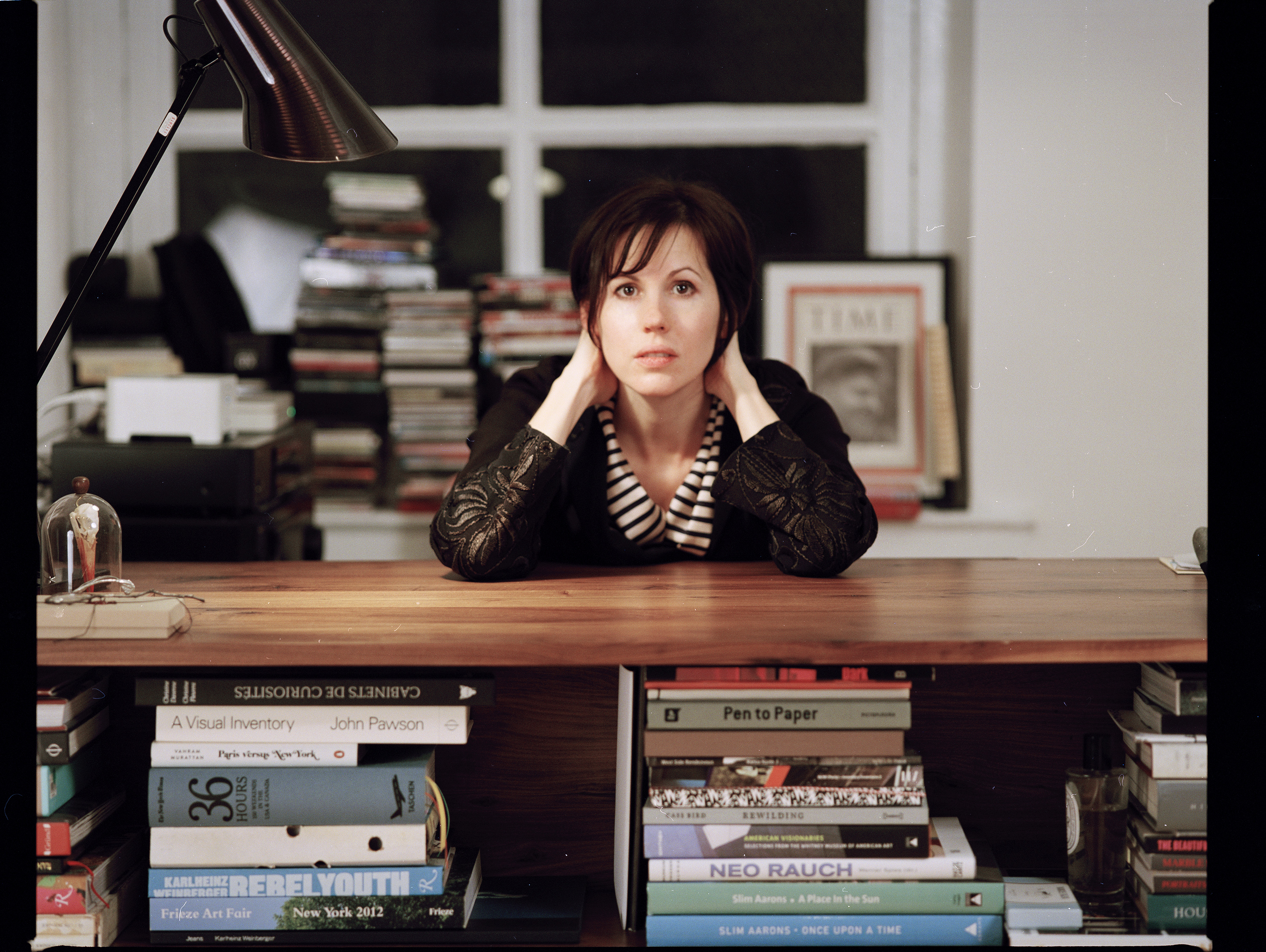
- Trussoni in 2016
- Education: MFA in fiction, Iowa Writers' Workshop
- Alma mater: University of Iowa
- Occupation: Novelist
- Writing career
- Language: English
- Notable awards: New York Times Best 10 Books of the Year, 2006 The Michener Copernicus Society of American Award Dana Award in Novel category, 2011
- Website: www.danielletrussoni.com

Danielle Anne Trussoni is a New York Times, USA Today, and Sunday Times Top 10 bestselling novelist. She has been a Pulitzer Prize in Fiction jurist, and wrote the "Dark Matters" column for the New York Times Book Review for five years, from 2018-2023. She is a graduate of the Iowa Writers' Workshop, where she was a Maytag Fellow. Her novels have been translated into 33 languages.

Her work includes six books: Falling Through the Earth (2006), Angelology (2010), Angelopolis (2012), The Fortress (2016), The Ancestor (2020), and The Puzzle Master (2023). Her most recent novel, The Puzzle Box, was published in 2024. She is the recipient of the Michener-Copernicus Society of America award, the Dana Award in the novel, and The New York Times Top 10 Book of the Year for her first book. In addition to being published in The New York Times Book Review, she has also been published in The Guardian, The New York Times Magazine, and Tin House. Her writings have been widely anthologized.

== Background ==
Trussoni is of Italian descent and grew up in La Crosse, Wisconsin. She graduated from the University of Wisconsin–Madison summa cum laude and Phi Beta Kappa with a BA in history and English in 1996 and from the Iowa Writers' Workshop, where she received an MFA in fiction writing in 2002. She has lived for extended periods in Japan, Bulgaria, England, France, and Mexico.

Trussoni currently lives in San Miguel de Allende, Mexico. She lived in France from 2009 to 2012 and her memoir, The Fortress, focuses on this period. She married the French filmmaker Hadrien Royo in 2016 in Brittany.

== Writing ==
=== The Puzzle Master series ===
Trussoni's latest books, The Puzzle Master and The Puzzle Box, were bought in a two-book pre-empt from Andrea Walker at Random House in 2022. There was significant foreign rights interest, and subsequently both books will be published in Spain, France, Germany, Romania, Greece, Japan, Italy, Poland, Croatia, Slovakia, Turkey, Latvia, Serbia, and Israel.

The Puzzle Master blends historical research with fictional elements. It was described by David Baldacci as:

as thrilling as it is erudite with a hero in Mike Brink who is brilliant, vulnerable and brave, with a mind irreversibly changed and enhanced by a tragic accident. In the nimble, talented hands of Trussoni the pages fly with meticulously crafted set pieces routinely punctured by machine gun bursts of visceral action. A fascinating history lesson wrapped in intriguing cryptographic challenges, mitered to ancient religious legends all bound around a locked room conundrum in an eerie gothic mansion of yesteryear, and laced with characters that are broad and deep, authentic and satisfying, this novel has it all and more. Here's to the next puzzle Brink finds himself party to. And let's hope his wonderfully cool dog Conundrum is right by his side as he suits up for round two.

The setting ranges from an upstate New York women's prison to nineteenth-century Prague to the secrets of the Pierpont Morgan Library, featuring a celebrated puzzle constructor Mike Brink who is thrust into a mystery involving an ancient religious cypher, one that will unlock shocking secrets about the universe, technology, and the fate of humankind.

The Puzzle Box, the follow-up to The Puzzle Master, follows Mike Brink as he attempts to solve a puzzle box in Japan. It is scheduled for publication in the fall of 2024.

=== The Ancestor ===
The Ancestor, a literary gothic novel that explores the darker realms of ancestry and inheritance, was published by William Morrow in April 2020. The book has been widely praised, described by Kirkus Reviews as "an opulently romantic horror tale" and "gothic extravaganza". Publishers Weekly called it "an intense, darkly gothic narrative with elements of mystery, the paranormal, and legendary tales".

=== Angelology series ===
Trussoni's first novel, Angelology (Viking Press, 2010) is a supernatural thriller described as a "tapestry of myth and biblical lore on our present-day world and plunged two star-crossed heroes into an ancient battle against mankind's greatest enemy: the fatally attractive angel-human hybrids known as the Nephilim".

Angelology received a great deal of attention prior to publication. Seven publishing houses vied for the publishing rights, resulting in a bidding war. Angelology went on to become a New York Times international bestseller and has been translated into over 30 languages.

Angelopolis, the follow-up to Angelology, was a New York Times bestseller and was described as "stunning" and "a must-read" by Booklist. Part historical novel, fantasy, love story, thriller, and mystery, it is a continuation of Angelology from the perspective of Verlaine.

Trussoni plans to continue the series by releasing serialized segments beginning in 2024.

=== Crypto-Z ===
Trussoni is the co-creator with Hadrien Royo of the Crypto-Z audio drama podcast, a companion to The Ancestor. Crypto-Z is the story of agent Jane Silver and her partner Felix Bright as they hunt down cryptids. The Crypto-Z world originated when Trussoni was conducting research for her novel The Ancestor and evolved into a scripted audio series, produced in 2019 and early 2020 with voice actors and production team members in New York City, London, and Los Angeles.

Upon release, the podcast landed on Apple's Top 10 list of fiction podcasts. The second and third seasons of the podcast are currently in production, and a game is also in development.

== Bibliography ==
- Falling Through The Earth, Henry Holt and Company, 2006, ISBN 0-8050-7732-4.
- Angelology, Viking Press, 2010, ISBN 978-0-385-66861-3.
- Angelopolis, Viking Press, 2013, ISBN 978-0-670-02554-1
- The Fortress, Dey Street/Harper Collins, 2016, ISBN 978-0-062-45900-8
- The Ancestor, William Morrow/Harper Collins, 2020 ISBN 9780062912756
- The Puzzle Master, Random House, 2023 ISBN 9780593595299
- The Puzzle Box, Random House, 2024 ISBN 9780593595329

== Reviews ==
- Star Herald, Thriller instinct: New and upcoming whodunits that will keep you in suspense all summer long, June 28, 2023
- Sun Sentinel, Book reviews: 'The Puzzle Master,' 'The Last Songbird', July 13, 2023
- NPR, 5 new mysteries and thrillers for the start of summer, June 12, 2023
- O, The Oprah Magazine, 29 Best Gothic Novels of All Time, October 21, 2020
- Goodreads, 2020's Top Horror Novels, October 5, 2020
- New York Times, You're Descended From Royalty. Here Are the Keys To Your Castle., Carol Goodman, April 7, 2020
- New York Times: Sunday Book Review, Cracked, Helene Wecker, May 3, 2013
- NPR, Angelology: A Cross-Bred Monster Of A Mystery, Jane Ciabattari, March 11, 2010
- Time, Angelology: Wings of Desire, Lev Grossman, March 15, 2010
- New York Times: Sunday Book Review, Fallen Angels, Susann Cokal, March 3, 2010
- New York Times: Books, The War at Home, Kathryn Harrison, March 12, 2006
- USA Today, 'Angelology': A heaven-sent supernatural thrill ride, Carol Memmott, March 12, 2010
- Elle Book Release: Angelology, Natasha Clark, March 12, 2010
