= Earth Inferno (album) =

Live album by Fields of the Nephilim
- Released: April 1991
- Recorded: Aug – Nov 1990
- Genre: Gothic rock
- Length: 77:15
- Label: Beggars Banquet
- Producer: Fields of the Nephilim & Andy Jackson

Fields of the Nephilim chronology
Elizium (1990)	Earth Inferno (1991)	Revelations (1993)

Professional ratings
Review scores
Source	Rating
Allmusic	3/5 stars
Pitchfork Media	(8.6/10.0)
Record Mirror	10/10

Earth Inferno is a mixed version of three live performances by Fields of the Nephilim which shares its name with a self-published book by occult artist Austin Osman Spare. The live venues used for the recordings were from the group's 1990 Sumerland tour at Wolverhampton Civic Hall (4 August), Brixton Academy (6 October), and Hamburg Sportshalle (6 November). The record was released in April 1991 by Beggars Banquet Records and peaked at number 39 in UK album charts.

== Track listing ==
All tracks by Fields of the Nephilim

Earth Inferno
No.	Title	Length
1.	"Intro (Dead but Dreaming); For Her Light; At the Gates of Silent Memory (Paradise Regained)"	16:08
2.	"Moonchild"	5:25
3.	"Submission"	7:34
4.	"Preacher Man"	4:51
5.	"Love Under Will"	6:17
6.	"Sumerland"	8:26
7.	"Last Exit for the Lost"	10:18
8.	"Psychonaut"	9:05
9.	"Dawnrazor"	9:09
Total length:		77:15

== Personnel ==
- Carl McCoy – lead vocals
- Tony Pettitt – bass
- Paul Wright – lead guitar
- Peter Yates – rhythm guitar
- Alexander "Nod" Wright – drums
- Paul Chousmer – keyboards
