= Elizium =

Studio album by Fields of the Nephilim
- Released: 24 September 1990
- Recorded: 1990 at Park Gate Studios, Battle, England; Astoria, Hampton Court, England
- Genre: Gothic rock, progressive rock
- Length: 48:03
- Language: English
- Label: Beggars Banquet
- Producer: Fields of the Nephilim, Andy Jackson

Fields of the Nephilim chronology
The Nephilim (1988)	Elizium (1990)	Earth Inferno (1991)

Singles from Elizium
- 1. "For Her Light" Released: July 1990; 2. "Sumerland (Dreamed Version)" Released: November 1990

Elizium is the third studio album by English gothic rock band Fields of the Nephilim. It was released on 24 September 1990 through record label Beggars Banquet. The album peaked at number 22 in the UK albums chart. It was the last album that Fields of the Nephilim would record with what is regarded as their classic line-up of Carl McCoy, Tony Pettitt, Peter Yates, and Paul and Alexander "Nod" Wright.

== Background ==
Using sensational spelling, the album was named after Elysium, a conception of the afterlife that developed over time and was maintained by some Greek religious and philosophical sects and cults.

The album was produced by Andy Jackson, also known for his work with Pink Floyd. The introduction for the third song of the album, "At the Gates of Silent Memory", features spoken lines by Aleister Crowley. The lines are excerpts from Crowley's poem "At Sea", recorded in 1920.

== Critical reception ==
Professional ratings
Review scores
Source	Rating
AllMusic	4.5/5 stars
Pitchfork Media	6.7/10

Ned Raggett of AllMusic in an optimistic review, said "The end result was the band's best all-around album, consisting of four lengthy pieces that showcase their now near-peerless abilities to create involved, textured, driving, and loud pieces of rock." and acknowledge "It was still goth as all heck, but like the best bands in any genre, the Nephilim transcended such artificial limitations to create their own sound.", praising the sound of the album to be "like it's about to call up darkling spirits from the nether planes." He picked out tracks such as "Submission" noting its "switching between minimal bass with guitar stabs and massive crescendos." as well as "Sumerland (What Dreams May Come)" which he claimed "takes the apocalyptic element of the Nephilim to its furthest extent; its relentless pulse supports some of the most powerful guitar out there while McCoy achieves a similar high point with his commanding voice." and concluded "Wail of Sumer" concludes Elizium on a striking two-part note, gently floating rather than exploding over its length, while McCoy's lost, regretful voice drifts along with it as a soft, yet still unnerving conclusion. Combine that with another fantastic job on art design, and Elizium, once you accept the Nephilim's basic conceits, simply stuns."

Skaht Hansen of Pitchfork gave the album 6.7/10 praising the band for being "Well- experienced and focused on their vision by the time of this album's 1990 release," praising both the sound and vocals of Carl McCoy on the album, describing it as having "a much more treated studio sound and slightly fewer guttural vocals from frontman Carl McCoy." However, he said with disdain "The only thing wrong with this scenario is that there are points where the album slips into a sound that's not too far from late- '80s glam rock. The track "Submission," for example, jumps into a flailing guitar solo midway through before dropping to a quieter moment, then gradually builds back up to more steel- string masturbation." but praised what he described as a "a cute jangly- dancy guitar song" was the track "(Paradise Regained)", stating "a jangly- dancy kind of guitar song and easily the most likable cut on the album." and concluded, "Fields of the Nephilim is a band that wants to hide in your dreams, to implant itself into surreal images of your subconscious. Although they fail at that particular goal on Elizium by taking a step out of the shadows, perhaps they achieve it by making sure their tunes get stuck in your head. And they will, once you get to know them. So say hello, introduce yourself, and prepare for the visions of the Nephilim."

== Track listing ==
All lyrics are written by Carl McCoy; all music is composed by Fields of the Nephilim (McCoy, Tony Pettitt, Paul Wright, Alexander "Nod" Wright, Peter Yates).

Side A
No.	Title	Length
1.	"(Dead But Dreaming)"	1:28
2.	"For Her Light"	3:01
3.	"At the Gates of Silent Memory"	8:24
4.	"(Paradise Regained)"	2:29
5.	"Submission"	8:28

Side B
No.	Title	Length
1.	"Sumerland (What Dreams May Come)"	11:09
2.	"Wail of Sumer"	6:24
3.	"And There Will Your Heart Be Also"	7:37

== Personnel ==
- Carl McCoy – vocals, production
- Paul Wright – lead guitar, production
- Alexander "Nod" Wright – drums, production
- Tony Pettitt – bass guitar, production
- Peter Yates – rhythm guitar, ebow, production

Additional personnel

- Jon Carin – additional keyboards

Technical

- Andy Jackson – production, engineering
- Sheer Faith/ Carl McCoy – sleeve design
- Chris Bigg – sleeve design
