= The Nephilim (album) =

Studio album by Fields of the Nephilim
- Released: September 1988
- Recorded: 1988
- Genre: Gothic rock
- Length: 55:23
- Labels: Situation Two, Beggars Banquet
- Producer: Fields of the Nephilim

Fields of the Nephilim chronology
Dawnrazor (1987)	The Nephilim (1988)	Elizium (1990)

Professional ratings
Review scores
Source	Rating
Allmusic	4.5/5 stars
Pitchfork Media	(6.4/10.0)
Virgin Encyclopedia of Eighties Music	3/5 stars

The Nephilim is the second studio album by Fields of the Nephilim, released in September 1988 by Situation Two/Beggars Banquet Records. The record debuted at number 12 in the UK album charts.

The album was recorded in The Justice Rooms, a former courthouse in England's Somerset countryside where defendants who were sentenced to death were hanged on site. "The place had a really cool vibe", recalls bassist Tony Pettitt.

The Nephilim’s opening track, "Endemoniada", shares its name with a 1968 Mexican horror film and features a man growling "Penitenziagite!", sampled from Ron Perlman's hunchback character, Salvatore, in The Name of the Rose. The album's top-charting single, "Moonchild", shares its name with Aleister Crowley's novel, while "Love Under Will" is a phrase from Crowley's Book of the Law. The lyrics for "The Watchman" and "Last Exit for the Lost" reference H. P. Lovecraft's character Cthulhu.

The third track "Phobia" is stylistically similar to Motörhead's hit song "Ace of Spades" including near identical guitar riffs.

The track "Shiva", originally the b-side of "Moonchild" single, is included only on the CD version of the album and not on the original LP release.

== Track listing ==
The Nephilim
No.	Title	Length
1.	"Endemoniada"	7:15
2.	"The Watchman"	5:31
3.	"Phobia"	3:37
4.	"Moonchild"	5:40
5.	"Chord of Souls"	5:08
6.	"Shiva"	4:50
7.	"Celebrate"	6:23
8.	"Love Under Will"	7:08
9.	"Last Exit for the Lost"	9:42
Total length:		55:23
