= Sex Pistols discography =

Discography of the punk band the Sex Pistols

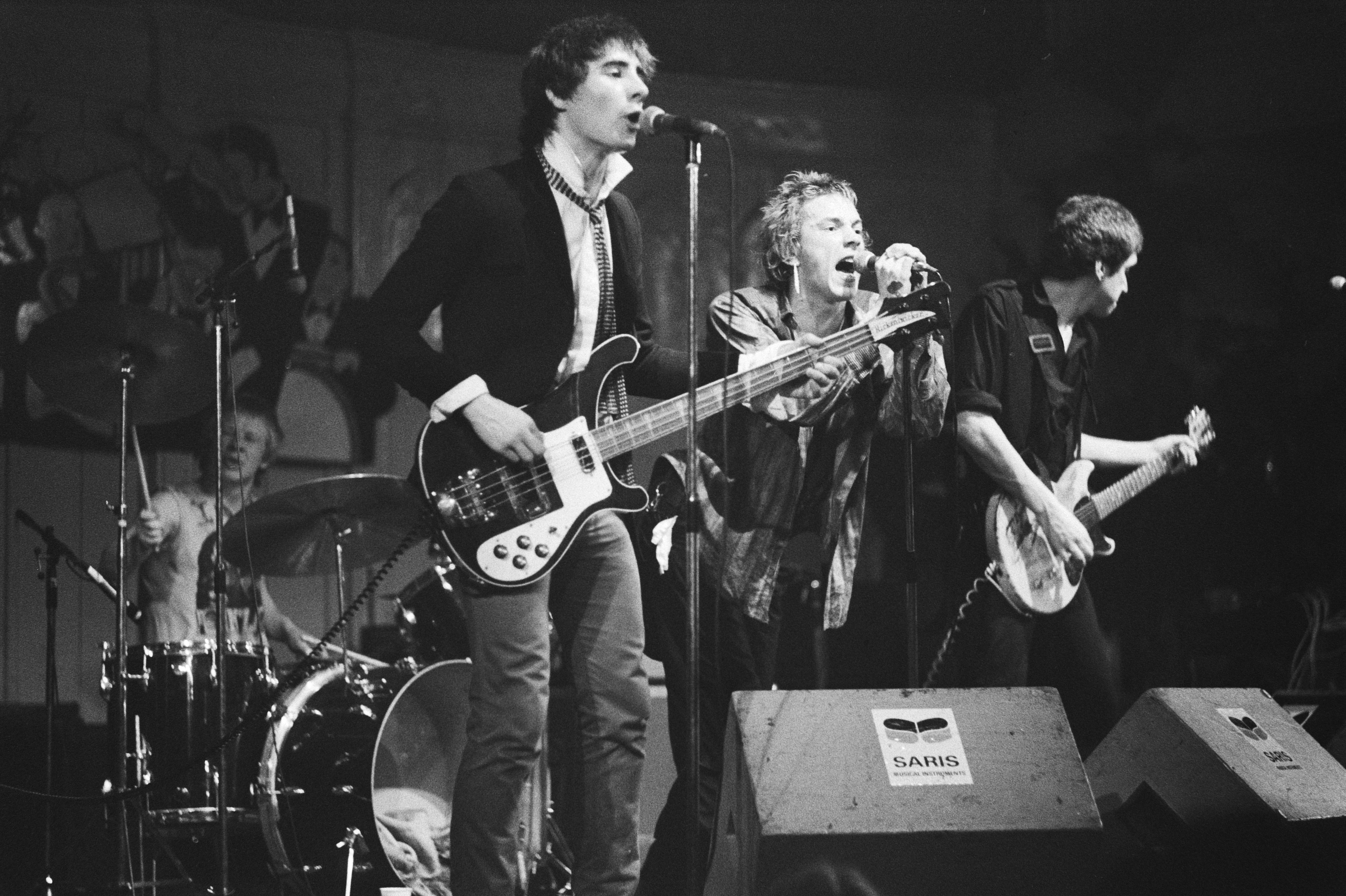

The British punk band the Sex Pistols' discography consists of four singles and a studio album released between November 1976 and November 1977 with their original singer Johnny Rotten, and two albums (one a soundtrack, the other a series of radio interviews) released by their manager Malcolm McLaren after Rotten's departure.

== Studio album ==
Year	Album details	Peak chart positions							Certifications
Year	Album details	UK	AUS (Note: Peaks in Australia: For all except noted: Kent, David (1993). Australian Chart Book 1970–1992 (illustrated ed.). St Ives, N.S.W.: Australian Chart Book. p. 269. ISBN 0-646-11917-6.; For Kiss This: "Discography Sex Pistols". australian-charts.com.)	NOR	NZ	SPA	SWE	US	Certifications
1977	Never Mind the Bollocks, Here's the Sex Pistols	1	23	11	27	100	12	106	BPI: 2× Platinum; RIAA: Platinum; NVPI: Gold

== Other albums ==
Year	Album details	Peak chart positions				Certifications
Year	Album details	UK	AUS (Note: See fn. 17.)	NZ	SWE	Certifications
1977	Spunk (Note: Bootleg release—1977; official release—1996, as part of Spunk/This Is Crap, bonus CD included with Never Mind the Bollocks reissue; official stand-alone release—2006.): Type: Early recordings for album; leaked by Dave Goodman	—	—	—	—	
1979	The Great Rock 'n' Roll Swindle: Type: Various artists soundtrack	7	44	26	—	BPI: Gold
1979	Some Product: Carri on Sex Pistols: Type: Interviews and radio spots	6	—	—	—	BPI: Silver
1980	Flogging a Dead Horse: Type: Compilation	23	—	49	—	BPI: Silver
1980	Sex Pack: Type: Compilation	—	—	—	—	
1985	Anarchy in the UK: Live at the 76 Club (Note: Bootleg release—1985; official release—2001): Type: Live	—	—	—	—	
1989	Pirates of Destiny (Note: Compilation of various unreleased songs, alternate takes, live songs, and interviews. Released on 12" vinyl in 1989 and on CD in 1991.) (Note: Release Information from AllMusic & Discogs): Type: Compilation	—	—	—	—	
1992	Kiss This: Type: Compilation	10	40	—	46	BPI: Gold
1993	Early Daze: The Studio Collection: Type: Compilation	—	—	—	—	
1996	Filthy Lucre Live: Type: Live	26	—	—	—	
2001	Live at Winterland 1978: Type: Live	—	—	—	—	
2002	Jubilee: Type: Compilation	29	—	—	—	BPI: Silver
2002	Sex Pistols: Type: Compilation (box set)	—	—	—	—	
2004	Raw and Live: Type: Live	—	—	—	—	
2008	Agents of Anarchy: Type: Compilation	—	—	—	—	
2008	Live & Filthy: Type: Live	—	—	—	—	

== Singles ==
Year	Single	Peak chart positions							Certifications	Album
Year	Single	UK (Note: See also "UK Top 40 Hit Database". everyHit.com.)	AUS (Note: See fn. 17.)	IRE	ITA	NOR	NZ	SWE	Certifications	Album
1976	"Anarchy in the U.K."/"I Wanna Be Me"	38	92	—	—	—	—	—	BPI: Silver	Never Mind the Bollocks, Here's the Sex Pistols
1977	"God Save the Queen"/"Did You No Wrong"	2	—	—	38	3	38	2	BPI: Silver	Never Mind the Bollocks, Here's the Sex Pistols
1977	"Pretty Vacant"/"No Fun"	6	52	11	—	9	—	10	BPI: Silver	Never Mind the Bollocks, Here's the Sex Pistols
1977	"Holidays in the Sun"/"Satellite"	8	—	—	43	—	—	13		Never Mind the Bollocks, Here's the Sex Pistols
1978	"No One Is Innocent"/"My Way"	7	68	12	—	—	—	—		The Great Rock 'n' Roll Swindle
1979	"Something Else"/"Friggin' in the Riggin'"	3	—	8	—	—	—	—	BPI: Silver	The Great Rock 'n' Roll Swindle
1979	"Silly Thing"/"Who Killed Bambi?" ^{c}	6	—	13	—	—	—	—	BPI: Silver	The Great Rock 'n' Roll Swindle
1979	"C'mon Everybody"	3	—	10	—	—	—	—	BPI: Silver	The Great Rock 'n' Roll Swindle
1979	"The Great Rock 'n' Roll Swindle"	21	—	—	—	—	—	—		The Great Rock 'n' Roll Swindle
1980	"(I'm Not Your) Steppin' Stone"	21	—	—	—	—	—	—		The Great Rock 'n' Roll Swindle
1992	"Anarchy in the UK" (re-issue)	33	—	—	—	—	—	—	—	Single only
1996	"Pretty Vacant (live)"	18	—	—	—	—	—	—	—	Filthy Lucre Live
2002	"God Save the Queen" (re-issue)	15	—	—	—	—	—	—	—	Single only

== Sources ==
- "Chart History: Sex Pistols: Billboard 200". Billboard. 2023.
- "BRIT Certified". Sex pistols. BPI. 2023.
- NVPI (2023). "Never Mind the Bollocks". Archived from the original on 3 December 2019.
- Warwick, Neil; Kutner, Jon; Brown, Tony (2004). The Complete Book of the British Charts: Singles & Albums (3rd ed.). Omnibus Press. ISBN 1-84449-058-0.
- "Discography Sex Pistols (Ireland)". irishcharts.ie.
- "Discography Sex Pistols (Italy)". italiancharts.com.
- "Discography Sex Pistols (New Zealand)". charts.nz. 2023.
- "Discography Sex Pistols (Norwegian)". norwegiancharts.com. 2023.
- "Discography Sex Pistols (Swedish)". swedishcharts.com. 2023.
- "Gold & Platinum". RIAA. 2023.
- "Sex Pistols: Official Albums Chart". Official Charts Company. 2023.
