= Jubilee (Sex Pistols album) =

Greatest hits album by Sex Pistols
- Released: 3 June 2002
- Recorded: 1976–1978, 1996
- Genre: Punk rock
- Label: Virgin Records

Singles from Jubilee
- 1. "God Save the Queen (2002 remix)" Released: 27 May 2002

Jubilee is a Sex Pistols singles compilation issued in 2002 to celebrate the Sex Pistols' 25th anniversary Jubilee (as well as the Golden Jubilee of Elizabeth II).

The album also included promo videos for God Save the Queen, Anarchy in the U.K. and Pretty Vacant.

The track "Pretty Vacant (Live)" is from the 1996 reunion tour. "Silly Thing" is not the version of the song that appears on The Great Rock 'N' Roll Swindle album, but the single version of the track which has vocals by Steve Jones instead of Paul Cook.

== Track listing ==
As follows:

1. "God Save the Queen"
2. "Anarchy in the UK"
3. "Pretty Vacant"
4. "Holidays in the Sun"
5. "No One Is Innocent"
6. "My Way"
7. "Something Else"
8. "Friggin' in the Riggin''"
9. "Silly Thing"
10. "C'mon Everybody"
11. "The Great Rock 'n' Roll Swindle"
12. "(I'm Not Your) Steppin' Stone"
13. "Pretty Vacant (Live)"
14. "EMI (Unlimited Edition)"

== Charts ==
| Chart (2002) | Peak position |
|---|---|
| Scottish Albums (OCC) | 29 |
| UK Albums (OCC) | 29 |

| Chart (2026) | Peak position |
|---|---|
| Greek Albums (IFPI) | 70 |

== Certifications ==
| Region | Certification | Certified units/sales |
|---|---|---|
| United Kingdom (BPI) | Silver | 60,000^{^} |
^{^} Shipments figures based on certification alone.
