= Flogging a Dead Horse =

Compilation album by Sex Pistols
- Released: 8 February 1980
- Recorded: 1976–1978
- Genre: Punk rock
- Length: 48:02
- Label: Virgin

Sex Pistols chronology
| Some Product: Carri on Sex Pistols (1979) | Flogging a Dead Horse (1980) |

Professional ratings
Review scores
| Source | Rating |
|---|---|
| AllMusic | 4/5 stars |

Flogging a Dead Horse is a compilation album of singles by the English punk rock band Sex Pistols, released after their break-up, and includes the four songs issued as singles A-sides that were included on Never Mind the Bollocks, Here's the Sex Pistols (1977), three of their B-sides, and the six A-sides taken from The Great Rock 'n' Roll Swindle (1979) and one B-side, "My Way".

== Background ==
By the time the record was released, the group was finished as a musical unit: the "Sex Pistols" consisted only of manager Malcolm McLaren, and designer Jamie Reid. Their relationship with Virgin records was difficult, and Reid's tacky sleeve design was intended to warn people against another cash-in; it was largely interpreted as a hip joke, and seems to have hurt sales very little.

Reid's first sleeve design consisted of the title hastily scrawled across his designs for the Never Mind the Bollocks (front cover) and The Great Rock 'n' Roll Swindle albums (back cover). It was printed, and copies exist, but was rejected by Virgin and never made it to record stores. For its replacement, Reid used a photo of a model from the cheapest agency he could find, along with dull letraset lettering, making the record look like a cheap easy listening album. The back cover featured a fake plastic dog turd on top of a gold disc of the Never Mind the Bollocks LP, a reference to a scene in the film The Great Rock 'n' Roll Swindle in which Steve Jones defecates on the gold disc awarded to Johnny Rotten for Never Mind The Bollocks and the woman with ants on her face eats it. The album was released without the band's involvement or permission.

== Title meaning ==
The title has several ironic meanings: the idiomatic one of the saying "Flogging a dead horse" reflecting the fact that the Pistols' endeavours were now finished, futile and pointless; and the British slang use of 'flogging' to mean 'selling' - i.e. the Pistols' management, in true punk style, were overtly referencing that they were trying to get as much money for as little effort as possible from the album's sales.

== Track listing ==
Side one

1. "Anarchy in the U.K." (Johnny Rotten, Steve Jones, Glen Matlock, Paul Cook) – 3:33
2. "I Wanna Be Me" (Rotten, Jones, Matlock, Cook) – 3:06
3. "God Save the Queen" (Rotten, Jones, Matlock, Cook) – 3:21
4. "Did You No Wrong" (Rotten, Jones, Matlock, Cook, Wally Nightingale) – 3:14
5. "Pretty Vacant" (Rotten, Jones, Matlock, Cook) – 3:18
6. "No Fun" (Iggy Pop, Ron Asheton, Scott Asheton, David Alexander) – 6:26
7. "Holidays in the Sun" (Rotten, Jones, Sid Vicious, Cook) – 3:21

Side two

1. "No One Is Innocent" (Jones, Cook, Ronnie Biggs) – 3:03
2. "My Way" (Paul Anka, Claude François, Jacques Revaux) – 4:05
3. "Something Else" (Eddie Cochran, Sharon Sheeley) – 2:12
4. "Silly Thing" (Jones, Cook) – 2:53
5. "C'mon Everybody" (Cochran, Jerry Capehart) – 1:57
6. "(I'm Not Your) Steppin' Stone" (Tommy Boyce, Bobby Hart) – 3:09
7. "Great Rock 'N' Roll Swindle" (Jones, Cook, Julien Temple) – 4:24

"No One Is Innocent" features train robber Ronnie Biggs and is listed as "The Biggest Blow" on the cover. "My Way", "Something Else" and "C'Mon Everybody" are sung by Sid Vicious and represent his complete studio recordings with the Sex Pistols. "Silly Thing" is sung by drummer Paul Cook, although the version that was released as a single in the UK was sung by Steve Jones. "Great Rock 'N' Roll Swindle" is sung by several hopefuls auditioning to be the Sex Pistols' new lead singer - the winner was Edward Tudor-Pole. The album sleeve features no individual credits.

== Certifications ==
| Region | Certification | Certified units/sales |
|---|---|---|
| United Kingdom (BPI) | Silver | 60,000^{^} |
^{^} Shipments figures based on certification alone.
