= Kiss This (album) =

Compilation album by Sex Pistols
- Released: 5 October 1992
- Recorded: 1976–1978
- Genre: Punk rock
- Length: 68:17
- Label: Virgin Records

Singles from Kiss This
- 1. "Anarchy in the U.K."/"I Wanna Be Me"/"Anarchy in the U.K. (demo)" Released: 21 September 1992; 2. "Pretty Vacant"/"No Feelings(demo)"/"EMI Unlimited (demo)"/"Satellite (demo)" Released: 23 November 1992

Kiss This is a compilation album of the Sex Pistols, released in 1992. The disc starts off with the band's four singles released prior to their break-up in early 1978, all included on their lone studio album, Never Mind the Bollocks, Here's the Sex Pistols. The disc contains the entirety of that album, along with b-sides to all four singles. The remaining four tracks comprise two from the soundtrack album The Great Rock 'n' Roll Swindle, the 1978 Sid Vicious solo single "My Way," and the 1979 remake of "Silly Thing" featuring only Steve Jones and Paul Cook from the original band.

Originally Kiss This was issued with a bonus disc featuring the 21 July 1977 show at Trondheim and a foldout colour poster. The standard edition of Kiss This comprises 20 tracks, but the Australian edition of the album is only 17 tracks long with the songs "I Wanna Be Me", "Don't Give Me No Lip, Child", and "Bodies" excluded from the track listing.

== Track listing ==
All tracks are written by Cook, Jones, Matlock, Rotten, except where noted.

| No. | Title | Writer(s) | Length |
|---|---|---|---|
| 1. | "Anarchy in the U.K." (EMI single 2566) |
| 2. | "God Save the Queen" (A&M single AMS 7284) |
| 3. | "Pretty Vacant" (Virgin single VS 184) |
| 4. | "Holidays in the Sun" (Virgin single VS 191) | Cook, Jones, Rotten, Vicious |
| 5. | "I Wanna Be Me" (b-side to "Anarchy in the UK") |
| 6. | "Did You No Wrong" (b-side to "God Save the Queen") | Cook, Jones, Matlock, Nightingale, Rotten |
| 7. | "No Fun" (b-side to "Pretty Vacant") | Alexander, Asheton, Asheton, Osterberg |
| 8. | "Satellite" (b-side to "Holidays in the Sun") |
| 9. | "Don't Give Me No Lip, Child" (from The Great Rock 'n' Roll Swindle) |
| 10. | "(I'm Not Your) Stepping Stone" (from The Great Rock 'n' Roll Swindle) | Tommy Boyce, Bobby Hart |
| 11. | "Bodies" | Cook, Jones, Rotten, Vicious |
| 12. | "No Feelings" |
| 13. | "Liar" |
| 14. | "Problems" |
| 15. | "Seventeen" |
| 16. | "Submission" |
| 17. | "New York" |
| 18. | "EMI (Unlimited Edition)" |
| 19. | "My Way" | Anka, Revaud, Francois, Thibaut |
| 20. | "Silly Thing" | Cook, Jones |

=== 1992 bonus disc ===
1. "Anarchy in the U.K."
2. "I Wanna Be Me"
3. "Seventeen"
4. "New York"
5. "EMI (Unlimited Edition)"
6. "No Fun"
7. "No Feelings"
8. "Problems"
9. "God Save the Queen"

== Charts ==
Chart performance for Kiss This
| Chart (1992) | Peak position |
|---|---|
| Australian Albums (ARIA) | 40 |
| Swedish Albums (Sverigetopplistan) | 46 |
| UK Albums (Official Charts) | 10 |

== Certifications ==
| Region | Certification | Certified units/sales |
|---|---|---|
| United Kingdom (BPI) | Gold | 100,000^{^} |
^{^} Shipments figures based on certification alone.
