= The Great Rock 'n' Roll Swindle (song) =

Single by Sex Pistols

from the album The Great Rock 'n' Roll Swindle
- B-side: "Rock Around The Clock"
- Released: 12 September 1979
- Recorded: Ramport Studios 1978
- Genre: Punk rock
- Length: 3:20
- Label: Virgin
- Songwriters: Paul Cook, Steve Jones, Julien Temple
- Producers: Steve Jones and Paul Cook

Sex Pistols singles chronology
"C'mon Everybody" (1979)	"The Great Rock 'n' Roll Swindle" (1979)	"(I'm Not Your) Steppin' Stone" (1980)

"The Great Rock 'n' Roll Swindle" is the title song of The Great Rock 'n' Roll Swindle movie soundtrack album.

The single was released on 12 September 1979 and featured vocals by Edward Tudor-Pole on both sides.

== Recording ==
According to producer Dave Goodman, both songs were recorded at The Who's Ramport Studios with himself playing bass on both tracks. According to Edward Tudor-Pole, the song originally featured lead vocals by Steve Jones.

The final vocals were recorded live on the second day of an audition for singers specially filmed for inclusion in The Great Rock 'n' Roll Swindle movie. Vocal takes by Edward Tudor-Pole and three others were recorded and later edited together. According to the soundtrack album record sleeve, filming and recording took place at the Duchess Theatre in June 1978, however John Lydon wrote in his autobiography that it was actually the Rainbow Theatre in Finsbury Park near his parents' home.

Vocals for the B-side, “Rock Around The Clock”, were recorded several weeks later.

== Charts ==
- The single spent 6 weeks in the UK Top 75, peaking at #21 on 13 October 1979.
- Virgin Records also released the single in the Netherlands and West Germany, but it did not chart.

== Covers ==
The song was covered by several bands, including Chaotic Dischord, Lolita No.18, Niblick Henbane, Rumble Militia
