= Who Killed Bambi? =

Who Killed Bambi? may refer to:

- "Who Killed Bambi?" (song), 1980 song by Tenpole Tudor with the Sex Pistols
- Who Killed Bambi? (unfinished film), a film featuring the Sex Pistols, due to be released in 1978
- Who Killed Bambi? (2003 film), French film
- Who Killed Bambi? (2013 film), Spanish film
- Vem dödade bambi?, 2019 Finland-Swedish novel by Monika Fagerholm
