= Filthy Lucre Live =

Live album by Sex Pistols
- Released: 29 July 1996
- Recorded: Finsbury Park, London, 23 June 1996
- Genre: Punk rock
- Length: 53:00
- Labels: Virgin (UK/US); Toshiba EMI (Japan)
- Producer: Chris Thomas

Singles from Filthy Lucre Live
- 1. "Pretty Vacant (live)"/"Bodies (live)"/"No Fun (live)"/"Problems (demo)" Released: 15 July 1996

Professional ratings
Review scores
Source	Rating
Robert Christgau	A−
The Rolling Stone Album Guide	2/5 stars

Filthy Lucre Live is a 1996 live album by the reunited Sex Pistols. The album was recorded live in London's Finsbury Park on 23 June 1996 during the band's Filthy Lucre Tour.

Filthy Lucre Live was produced and mixed by Chris Thomas at Townhouse Studios in London. Thomas, who is noted for his work with The Beatles and Roxy Music, also produced the Sex Pistol's classic debut album, Never Mind The Bollocks, Here's The Sex Pistols. Chris Thomas is credited with developing the densely layered, "wall of sound" the band is identified with.

BBC Radio 1 broadcast the complete concert live, this included the Pistol's final encore, a cover version of The Stooges' "No Fun". This song was not included on standard editions of Filthy Lucre Live but was an exclusive bonus track in Japan. Ironically, this made the Toshiba-EMI release of Filthy Lucre Live, the only version that featured the concert in its entirety.

== Track listing ==
All songs written by John Lydon, Steve Jones, Paul Cook and Glen Matlock, except as shown.

1. "Bodies" (Lydon, Jones, Cook, John Beverley) – 3:34
2. "Seventeen" – 2:31
3. "New York" – 3:26
4. "No Feelings" – 2:59
5. "Did You No Wrong" (Steve Jones, Paul Cook, Glen Matlock, Wally Nightingale) – 3:41
6. "God Save the Queen" – 3:23
7. "Liar!" – 2:46
8. "Satellite" – 4:07
9. "(I'm Not Your) Steppin' Stone" (Tommy Boyce, Bobby Hart) – 2:53
10. "Holidays in the Sun" (Lydon, Jones, Cook, Beverley) – 3:29
11. "Submission" – 4:42
12. "Pretty Vacant" – 3:33
13. "EMI" – 4:16
14. "Anarchy in the U.K." – 3:32
15. "Problems" – 4:37

Japanese bonus tracks

1. "Buddies" – 3:32 (alternate audience recording of "Bodies")
2. "No Fun" – 7:12 (final song of the performance, broadcast live on BBC Radio 1)
3. "Problems" (Spedding Demo) – 3:36 (demo recorded by Chris Spedding in May 1976)

== Charts ==
Chart performance for Filthy Lucre Live
Chart (1996)	Peak position
Australian Albums (ARIA)	90
UK Albums (Official Charts)	26

== Personnel ==
- Johnny Rotten – lead vocals
- Steve Jones – guitar, backing vocals
- Glen Matlock – bass, backing vocals
- Paul Cook – drums
