= The Filth and the Fury =

- British DVD cover
- Directed by: Julien Temple
- Written by: Julien Temple
- Produced by: Anita Camarata; Amanda Temple
- Starring: John Lydon; Steve Jones; Glen Matlock; Paul Cook; Sid Vicious; Malcolm McLaren
- Cinematography: Julien Temple
- Edited by: Niven Howie
- Music by: Sex Pistols
- Production companies: FilmFour; Jersey Shore; Nitrate Film; Panacea Entertainment; The Sex Pistols Residuals
- Distributed by: FilmFour Distributors
- Release dates: 25 January 2000 (Sundance); 12 May 2000 (UK)
- Running time: 108 minutes
- Country: United Kingdom
- Language: English

The Filth and the Fury is a 2000 British rockumentary film directed by Julien Temple. It follows the story of punk rock pioneers the Sex Pistols from their humble beginnings in London's Shepherd's Bush to their fall at the Winterland Ballroom in San Francisco. It is considered a continuation of Temple's first documentary centered on the band, titled The Great Rock and Roll Swindle, but acts as an opportunity for the surviving members of the group to tell their side of the story.

== Description ==
The Filth and the Fury is the second movie Julien Temple made about the Sex Pistols. His first movie was The Great Rock and Roll Swindle, which was released in British cinemas on 15 May 1980. This earlier movie was criticised for being too skewed towards the Pistols' manager Malcolm McLaren's version of events about the band. (Note: Peter Bradshaw in The Guardian called the earlier movie "a gloating partisan account of the Sex Pistols from the point of view of their hated manager"; critic Roger Ebert, who had worked with McLaren and the band, called it "a version of the Pistols story supplied by Malcolm McLaren, their infamously self-promoting manager".) The Filth and the Fury tells the story from the viewpoint of the band members themselves (albeit in silhouette during their contemporary interviews).

The title of the film is a reference to a headline that appeared in the British tabloid newspaper The Daily Mirror on 2 December 1976 after an interview on ITV's Today presented by Bill Grundy. The title of The Daily Mirror article was itself inspired by William Faulkner's novel The Sound and the Fury which was in turn taken from a line in Macbeth.

Temple's documentary narrates the rise, decline and fall of the Sex Pistols from their humble beginnings in London's Shepherd's Bush to their disintegration at the Winterland Ballroom in San Francisco. Temple puts the band into historical context with Britain's social situation in the 1970s through archival footage from the period. This film was promoted as an opportunity for the Pistols to tell their perspective of the story mostly through interviews with the surviving members of the group, footage shot during the era, and outtakes from The Great Rock and Roll Swindle.

== Reception ==
On the review aggregator website Rotten Tomatoes, 95% of 39 critics' reviews are positive. The website's consensus reads: "The Filth and the Fury is a complete and completely unabashed look at The Sex Pistols, shot in suitably propulsive punk fashion." Metacritic, which uses a weighted average, assigned the film a score of 82 out of 100, based on 28 critics, indicating "universal acclaim".

Roger Ebert of the Chicago Sun-Times gave the film three and a half out of four stars.

== Soundtrack ==
The soundtrack to the film was released in 2002. The two-disc set contains songs by the Sex Pistols as well as music from other artists that was used in the film.

Disc one

1. "God Save the Queen (Symphony)"
2. "Shang-a-Lang" – Bay City Rollers
3. "Pictures of Lily" – The Who
4. "Virginia Plain" – Roxy Music
5. "School's Out" – Alice Cooper
6. "Skinhead Moonstomp" – Symarip
7. "Glass of Champagne" – Sailor
8. "Through My Eyes" – The Creation
9. "The Jean Genie" – David Bowie
10. "I'm Eighteen" – Alice Cooper
11. "Submission"
12. "Don't Gimme No Lip Child"
13. "What'cha Gonna Do About It"
14. "Road Runner"
15. "Substitute"
16. "Seventeen"

Disc two

1. "Anarchy in the UK"
2. "Pretty Vacant"
3. "Did You No Wrong"
4. "Liar"
5. "EMI"
6. "No Feelings"
7. "I Wanna Be Me"
8. "Way Over (In Dub)" – Tapper Zukie
9. "Looking for a Kiss" – New York Dolls
10. "Holidays in the Sun"
11. "No Fun"

== See also ==
- Sid and Nancy
