= Belsen Was a Gas =

1979 song by Sex Pistols

Song by Sex Pistols

from the album The Great Rock 'n' Roll Swindle
- Released: 24 February 1979
- Genre: Punk rock
- Length: 2:12
- Label: Virgin
- Songwriters: Johnny Rotten; Steve Jones; Sid Vicious; Paul Cook
- Producer: Dave Goodman

"Belsen Was a Gas" is a song by the English punk rock band the Sex Pistols, about one of the Nazi concentration camps in Nazi Germany liberated by British troops in 1945, Bergen-Belsen. The song was released on 23 February 1979 by Virgin Records for the band's soundtrack to the 1980 film The Great Rock 'n' Roll Swindle.

== Composition ==
According to the ASCAP, credited songwriters are Sid Vicious, Paul Cook, Steve Jones, and John Lydon. Others generally accept Vicious wrote it while in his earlier band the Flowers of Romance. Commenting on Vicious writing the tune, guitarist Keith Levene has stated:

Sid always used to have some catchphrase he found funny. He used to go on and on, "Hey Keith, you know Belsen was a gas" ... So I said, "Belsen was a gas huh? Well, I'll show you Belsen was a gas; THIS is how it goes man." and I banged out the riff to the tune, which later The Pistols covered. PIL also played it too. We were nihilists in a way, but we were never political in any conventional sense of that word. What we truly were was nihilists, destructive nihilists, but we weren't pessimistic ... We were interested in the ruins, the destruction, but then we were interested in what we could build out of the rubble. What light could come out of the darkness?

Its title is a pun on the poison gases used in many Nazi concentration camps, referencing a "gas" as slang for a fun time. In fact, there were no gas chambers at Bergen-Belsen, as it was not one of the extermination camps. The song's darkly humorous lyrics were intended to irritate the generation the group believed were responsible for many of the political and social problems in Britain at that time. Later, Lydon said that he felt that this song crossed the line into gratuitous bad taste. In an interview conducted for Q magazine in 1996 he stated "[the song] was a very nasty, silly little thing... that should've ended up on the cutting room floor."

== Release history ==
"Belsen Was a Gas" appears in two versions on The Great Rock 'n' Roll Swindle album, first a live version from the Sex Pistols' last concert (San Francisco, 14 January 1978), then in an altered studio version with Ronnie Biggs on vocals. Biggs insisted on adding an additional verse; he later said because he had read the published diary of Anne Frank. The second verse describes some of the treatment Jews received:

Dentists searched their teeth for gold
Frisk the Jews for banknotes rolled
When they found out what they'd got,
"Line them up and shoot the lot.

The version with Biggs is also altered in its musical composition. In the original version done with Rotten, the main theme is a power chord riff that goes D, C, D, E♭ (plays with "Belsen was a gas, I heard the other day"). When rerecorded for the Biggs version, that theme is drastically altered to D, C, B♭, C, a much more conventional progression. Biggs did not receive writing credit for the revised lyrics. The Biggs version was originally slated to be a single, but after an airplay and record shop ban on the earlier Great Rock 'n' Roll Swindle single, "No One Is Innocent" (due to Biggs being the lead vocalist), this idea was dropped. The Biggs remake also ends with a saxophone solo, the first on a Pistols record.

The live version from San Francisco ends with Johnny Rotten haranguing the listener to "Be a man / Kill a man / Be someone / Kill someone / Be a man / Kill yourself!" as the music abruptly stops. Of this version of the song, Lester Bangs wrote, "It's one of the most frightening things I've ever heard. You wonder exactly what you might be affirming by listening to this over and over again. On one level Johnny Rotten/Lydon is an insect buzzing atop the massed ruins of a civilization leveled by itself, which I suppose justifies him right there, on another level he's just another trafficker in cheap nihilism with all that it includes—cheap racism, sexism, etc. I'm still not comfortable with 'Bodies.' But then I never was, which may be the point. But then I wonder if he is. After which I cease to wonder at anything beyond the power of this music."

On most versions of the album, the live version is listed in grammatically-incorrect German, using Gothic script, as "Einmal Belsen war vortrefflich" (roughly, "Once Belsen was excellent") and Biggs' version is "Einmal Belsen war wirklich vortrefflich" (roughly, "Once Belsen was really excellent"). The first UK sleeve gave the titles as "Belsen Was a Gas" and "Belsen Vos a Gassa".

The Sex Pistols (2002) box set includes another live version of "Belsen Was a Gas" on disc 3. This version was recorded on January 10, 1978, at the Longhorn Ballroom, Dallas, Texas, a concert that was filmed and has been released on home video. The Longhorn version of the song is notable for Lydon sneering "Join the army!" in the song's closing tirade.

"Belsen Was a Gas" was played by the Sex Pistols at the Crystal Palace Silver Jubilee show in 2002 when they played all of their catalogue in one night. When the Sex Pistols reformed for a reunion tour of the U.S. in 2003, after the start of the Iraq War, they performed an adapted version of the song, called "Baghdad Was a Blast", as an attack on President George W. Bush's policies in the region. At the first of the band's Brixton Academy shows in November 2007, the song was performed in a further adapted version, this time as "Brixton Was a Blast".

John Lydon's successor band, Public Image Ltd, performed the song in concert from 1978 to 1979 in a set that mostly featured work from the band's first album, Public Image: First Issue (1978). At the Kings Hall in Manchester in 1979, Lydon introduced the song by saying, "The next one is sarcasm, in case you get it wrong." On a recording of the December 1978 Rainbow Theatre concert he responds to crowd complaints by saying "if you make as much fuss about the next fucking bus you've got to wait for, you might be better off, know what I mean?"

Vicious performed and released a version on his solo album Sid Sings, introduced on the album as "[written] by Sid Vicious!"

Cover versions of the song have been performed and recorded live and in studio by bands including British punk group the Exploited who played theirs as early as 1983. Chaos UK also covered the song. The song was covered in 1996 by the neo-Nazi skinhead band No Remorse.

== Demo version ==
A demo of the song was rediscovered during a move from Virgin to Universal Music Group's catalogue in January 2012. It was included in the Never Mind the Bollocks, Here's the Sex Pistols box set and released that 24 September. It includes faint reverberating vocals. A different version, "Belsen Was a Gas Demo 2", was released in a different box set on 19 April 2014.
