= Carnival in Rio (Punk Was) =

Single by Die Toten Hosen & Ronnie Biggs

from the album Learning English, Lesson One
- Released: 1991
- Genre: Punk rock
- Length: 3:08
- Label: Virgin Records
- Songwriters: Ronnie Biggs; Andreas Frege; Andreas von Holst

Die Toten Hosen singles chronology
"All die ganzen Jahre" (1990)	"Carnival in Rio (Punk Was)" (1991)	"Baby Baby" (1991)

"Carnival in Rio (Punk Was)" is a song by Die Toten Hosen and Ronnie Biggs. It's the lead single and the fifteenth track from the cover album Learning English, Lesson One, being also the only non-cover on the album.

The song starts with a spoken intro of a child asking his dad what was punk rock. Ronnie then starts "telling" (singing) him about the punk attitude, which is most importantly about "not giving a fuck".

Since Biggs was hiding from the British authorities in Rio de Janeiro at the time, the vocals were recorded there.

The b-sides to the single were also recorded with Biggs.

== Music video ==
The video was directed by Markus Herold. Also the video was made in Rio de Janeiro. It features the band and Biggs singing the song and having fun around the city, also clips of recording the song.

== Track listing ==
1. "Carnival in Rio (Punk Was)" (Frege, von Holst/Biggs) − 3:08
2. "No One Is Innocent (song)" (Steve Jones/Biggs) – 3:03 (Sex Pistols & Ronnie Biggs cover)
3. "Police on My Back" (Eddy Grant) - 2:16 (The Equals cover)

== Charts ==
Year	Country	Position
1991	Germany	36
