= Silly Thing =

- The "Silly Thing" single cover.

Single by Sex Pistols

from the album The Great Rock 'n' Roll Swindle
- A-side: "Silly Thing"
- B-side: "Who Killed Bambi?"
- Released: 30 March 1979
- Recorded: Regents Park Studios, London / Rockfield Studios, Wales
- Genre: Punk rock
- Label: Virgin
- Songwriters: Paul Cook and Steve Jones

Sex Pistols singles chronology
""Somethin' Else""	"Silly Thing"	""C'mon Everybody""

Music video
- "Silly Thing" on Dailymotion

"Silly Thing" is a song by the Sex Pistols that was released in 1979. It was the 3rd single released in promotion of the film The Great Rock 'n' Roll Swindle. It was written by drummer Paul Cook and guitarist Steve Jones, and recorded after the band's original lead singer, Johnny Rotten, left the band. Typically, Jones also played bass in the studio, rather than suffer the ineptitude of the band's official bassist, Sid Vicious.

== "Silly Thing" (A-side) ==
=== Paul Cook album version ===
The original version of the song, on which Paul Cook sings lead vocals and Steve Jones plays bass guitar, was recorded with engineer Steve Lipson at Regents Park Studios in London in April or May 1978. The recording of further guitar overdubs and the final mixing took place at Rockfield Studios in Wales with producer Dave Goodman in late May 1978.

This original version of "Silly Thing" appeared on the movie soundtrack album of The Great Rock 'n' Roll Swindle and was used for the single in New Zealand, France and Japan.

A different mix of this original version, with Cook singing the verses and Jones singing the chorus, was released in 1988 in Japan, along with an outtake from the same recording sessions, the original version of the Jones/Cook composition "Here We Go Again".

=== Steve Jones single version ===
In the second week of March 1979, Jones and Cook went into Wessex Studios in London with engineer Bill Price and recorded a new version of the song. On this version, bass guitar was played by Andy Allen of the Lightning Raiders, who later in the year formed The Professionals with Cook and Jones.

This version of "Silly Thing" was used for the single in the UK, Australia, West Germany and Portugal. It appeared on the 1992 Sex Pistols compilation Kiss This.

== "Who Killed Bambi?" (B-side) ==
The song "Who Killed Bambi?" was written and sung by Edward Tudor-Pole, with Vivienne Westwood contributing to the lyrics.

The song was recorded with a 45 piece orchestra, arranged and conducted by Andrew Jackman, in a large studio in Wembley in summer 1978. Tudor-Pole's vocals were added later at the same studio.

The subsequent movie sequence of Tudor-Pole performing the song was filmed in one day with actress Irene Handl at Rainbow Theatre in London.

The 2025 Netflix series Zero Day features the song frequently as an auditory hallucination experienced by Robert de Niro’s character George Mullen. Mullen, who is suffering from delusions, also writes the song’s title repeatedly in his notebook (or perceives he has done so).

== Charts ==
- In the UK, the single spent 8 weeks in the Top 75 and reached #6 on 15 April 1979.
