= Who Killed Bambi? (unfinished film) =

1978 film featuring the Sex Pistols

Who Killed Bambi? was to be the first film featuring the punk rock band the Sex Pistols, and was due to be released in 1978. Russ Meyer and then Jonathan Kaplan were due to direct from a script by Roger Ebert and Pistols' manager Malcolm McLaren.

== Development ==
McLaren wanted to use the film as a vehicle for the Sex Pistols to break into the American market as opposed to releasing a single or an album. "The Sex Pistols are not a 'music group'," said McLaren. "They play music and they write songs but they are more of a social event. With a film we can demonstrate very clearly the whole social condition the band came out of and deliver that in its pure and undiluted form to everyone outside the UK."

Some members of the band were fans of Meyer's film Beyond the Valley of the Dolls, and McLaren hired him to make the film. "McLaren was sincere," recalled Meyer. "He was really a zealot. He had fire in his eyes."

=== Scripting ===
A script was written by Roger Ebert, who had co-written Meyer's Beyond the Valley of the Dolls. Ebert had never heard of the band, and says Meyer told him "We can go wild on this. I've got a couple of big-titted London girls already in mind." (A script had apparently been written by Rene Daalder, but Meyer discarded it.)

The film was intended as a punk rock version of A Hard Day's Night.

Meyer said it was "more on the order of Beyond the Valley of the Dolls. Instead of four girls, I had four boys. It was about this supposedly aging rock star who was prone to go out into the Queen's Reserve, shoot a deer, and then give it to the poor. He was dressed in livery and had a convertible Rolls-Royce."

According to Ebert, "McLaren thought of Meyer as a fascist. Meyer thought of McLaren as a source for money to make an RM film."

The working title was Anarchy in the UK, after one of the band's most famous songs.

=== Rehearsal ===
According to Meyer, the sets were built and the film cast. He rehearsed with the Sex Pistols. Meyer found guitarist Steve Jones and drummer Paul Cook "very intelligent, level-headed guys", but thought singer Johnny Rotten and bassist Sid Vicious "were absolutely nuts. Both had an intense hatred for McLaren. They would call me up at two in the morning to say unspeakable horrors about him." Meyer said Rotten "definitely had a charisma" and Vicious embraced the idea of sex scenes between him and Marianne Faithfull (set to play his mother), "but he objected to us showing them shooting up."

=== Budget ===
Meyer said "they never really knew" what the budget was "because McLaren had no conception of what it would cost. We did some eight versions of the script... The conception from the beginning was based on a lack of knowledge. And I have to include myself in that."

Meyer says originally McLaren had committed only £150,000 with no expense for the Sex Pistols. Meyer said this would not cover one quarter of the film. However the Sex Pistols' popularity increased, so McLaren could get $300,000 from Warner Bros and an extra amount of money from 20th Century Fox in England to bring finance up to $1 million. "But the budget was like $1.7 million," said Meyer. "Everyone was pulling their hair."

== Filming ==
Filming started in October 1977. Meyer filmed for three days (though no footage involved the band). Then 20th Century Fox withdrew and shooting was abandoned.

=== Reasons for cancellation ===
According to Meyer, Grace Kelly "got involved in it. She despises me, and she's an important stockholder at Fox. She was going to pull out all support of Fox in Europe." This was confirmed in media reports at the time.

McLaren said Fox pulled out after reading the screenplay. Ebert says "This seems unlikely because the studio would not have green-lighted the film without reading the script."

Ebert wrote that Meyer said "McLaren had made false promises of financing and was broke. Electricians and others had walked off after not being paid. Meyer himself demanded each week's salary be deposited every Monday morning."

"To get in that situation where you're just the director and not the producer where you can call the shots-it's a very frustrating experience," said Meyer.

Sets that had been built at Bray Studios in Berkshire were destroyed. Meyer and the Sex Pistols both wound up suing each other.

"Too bad it couldn't have been made," said Meyer. "Probably Vicious would still be living."

== The Great Rock 'n' Roll Swindle ==
Following Meyer's departure, Jonathan Kaplan was briefly attached to the project.

McLaren eventually made The Great Rock 'n' Roll Swindle with director Julien Temple, the trailer for which included the title shot of a deer being killed. This scene was not, however, in the finished film. A song with the same name is also featured in the film, sung by Edward Tudor-Pole. Additional footage appeared in the 2000 documentary The Filth and the Fury.

In April 2010, Roger Ebert posted the screenplay of Who Killed Bambi? (originally titled Anarchy in the UK) on his blog.
