= Filthy Lucre Tour =

1996 Sex Pistols reunion tour

Filthy Lucre
- Tour by the Sex Pistols
- Start date: 21 June 1996
- End date: 7 December 1996
- No. of shows: 72

The Filthy Lucre Tour was a concert tour by English punk rock band Sex Pistols. Announced in March 1996 following speculation and criticism from the band's former manager Malcolm McLaren and a reviewer for The Times, the tour was conducted for financial reasons and named after a 1976 Daily Express headline. The setlist was composed entirely of previously existing material and signature covers and ran from their 21 June 1996 performance at Messila Festival in Finland to their 7 December 1996 performance at Estadio Monumental David Arellano in Chile. Their Finsbury Park appearance was filmed and released as Filthy Lucre Live, while their dates in Ireland were cancelled on moral grounds and their Roskilde Festival performance was truncated after the band were bottled. The tour itself was criticised by reviewers for NME, Melody Maker, The Times, The Herald, the Los Angeles Times, and Variety and later by Skin but praised by reviewers from The New York Times and later by Rolling Stone, while the album was praised by Stephen Thomas Erlewine and a reviewer for The Independent.

== History ==
=== Background and announcement ===
The Sex Pistols achieved widespread notoriety after appearing on Bill Grundy's Today programme in December 1976. At the time, the band comprised Johnny Rotten, Steve Jones, Paul Cook, and Glen Matlock, with the band's manager Malcolm McLaren replacing Matlock with Sid Vicious in February 1977. With the latter lineup, the band had a UK number one album with Never Mind the Bollocks, Here's the Sex Pistols and a controversial UK top two single with "God Save the Queen". The band split up in January 1978 after a concert at Winterland Ballroom, with Rotten changing his name back to John Lydon and declining to perform any Sex Pistols songs for several years afterward. Vicious died of a heroin overdose in 1979 while awaiting trial for the murder of Nancy Spungen. After finding he had time on his hands while in Los Angeles, Matlock decided to meet Jones, with whom he decided to meet Lydon, who had mellowed on the idea of performing Sex Pistols songs again after venting his frustrations in his 1994 autobiography Rotten: No Irish, No Blacks, No Dogs.

The band began making arrangements to reunite in summer 1995. Speculation that the band would reunite made the 10 February 1996 issue of Melody Maker, prompting McLaren to describe the band as "being sent out like those old dray horses before they go to pasture" and David Sinclair of The Times to write that for "anyone who recalls with fondness the incandescent glory of the Pistols in their prime, [...] the idea of the band that once set out to bury the rock establishment returning as yet another revivalist cabaret act is almost too sad to contemplate". The four original Sex Pistols announced their reunion at a testy press conference on 18 March 1996, at which Rotten described Vicious as "nothing more than an empty coathanger to fill an empty spot onstage". The band made no attempt to hide the fact that they still hated each other and had reunited solely for financial reasons, with Rotten stating that the band's "common cause" was "your money". They named their tour "Filthy Lucre" after a tabloid headline in the Daily Express ("Punk? Call It Filthy Lucre") shortly after their Today appearance.

=== Performances ===
No new material was written for the tour, with the band augmenting their discography with covers of "Substitute" by the Who, "No Fun" by the Stooges and "(I'm Not Your) Steppin' Stone" by the Monkees, although their Roseland Ballroom concert in August 1996 comprised Bollocks plus "Did You No Wrong", "Stepping Stone", and "Satellite". Rehearsals took place at Lydon's home in Los Angeles. Their first gig took place in Finland, followed by Germany and then at Finsbury Park, at which they were supported by 60 Ft. Dolls, Goldblade, 3 Colours Red, Fluffy, Stiff Little Fingers, the Buzzcocks, Skunk Anansie, the Wildhearts, and Iggy Pop. Their Finsbury Park performance was released as Filthy Lucre Live shortly after it was recorded and reached number 26 on the UK Albums Chart; around this time, Bollocks was reissued and peaked at number 45. At their Hollywood Palladium concert in August 1996, the band were supported by Goldfinger and Gravity Kills. Many of the tour's venues were significantly larger than during their 1970s run as the band had broken up before they could play any large venues and were kitted out with enlarged headlines from their heyday.

Two dates in Ireland were scheduled, one in Belfast and one in Dublin; these were cancelled after the band were banned from playing in the country on grounds of "blasphemous content" and replaced by a performance at Shepherd's Bush Empire. A performance at Roskilde Festival in Denmark resulted in the band leaving the stage after eighteen minutes after being bottled. Some regarded the band's early departure as hypocritical given that the Sex Pistols had become notorious for misbehaving, however the journalist Denis Decay was sufficiently disgruntled to drug the festivalgoers responsible. Skunk Anansie were thrown off the tour after their Thebarton Theatre date after their frontwoman Skin stood up to a racist pulling her hat off and throwing beer at her; in a January 2019 NME interview, she stated that she had not enjoyed touring with the Sex Pistols due to the racism administered by audiences, and criticising Rotten for his failure to address the matter.

=== Reception and aftermath ===
Early reviews were not positive. Sinclair criticised their Finsbury Park performance for its "arthritic rhythm section" and its set list for "lacking depth and variety", wrote that it was "hard to ignore the element of pantomime in the performance", and described Lydon as looking "more like a postcard-punk caricature than he ever did in his original incarnation". MJ of Melody Maker compared their Phoenix Festival performance to a cabaret show and Rotten to a "pink and green-haired Liza Minnelli", while the NME described the band as "bloated, dilapidated dinosaurs". Robert Hilburn of the Los Angeles Times wrote of a Red Rocks Amphitheatre performance in July 1996 that the band was not the Sex Pistols but the "Cap Pistols", mocking the "decidedly overweight and apparently out of shape" Rotten's "god-awful red, black and chartreuse outfit that makes him look either like an usher at a midnight screening of The Rocky Horror Picture Show or the next loony villain in a Batman movie".

Jon Pareles of The New York Times wrote that during their August 1996 Roseland Ballroom concert, Rotten "sang as if every bitter, defiant, sarcastic word was exactly what he wanted to say", though wrote that the Pistols played "more slowly than current punks". Reviewing a Hollywood Palladium performance later that month, Troy J. Augusto of Variety wrote that the Pistols "executed a workman-like, hour-long punk show that was short on energy, both on stage and in the sheepish pits that moped on the floor in front of the stage, but long on musical nostalgia". He also criticised Goldfinger for delivering "a half-hearted set that couldn't have interested the audience any less" and described Gravity Kills as "a weak and trendy Nine Inch Nails rip-off whose hyperactive keyboardist should be given a sedative, followed by many piano lessons". Writing retrospectively, The Herald wrote in June 2007 that the band's efforts were "a bit like watching grandpa attempt to emulate Eminem after a one too may sherries on Christmas day" [sic], however Andy Greene of Rolling Stone was more positive in January 2013, describing the shows as "absolutely explosive".

Reviewing Filthy Lucre Live, The Independent favourably compared Rotten with Roy Chubby Brown and wrote that the album "springs from the speakers with more spunk and drive than we have any right to expect, sounding just as angry as a two-decade grudge should". Stephen Thomas Erlewine of AllMusic wrote that the band sounded "much heavier and less revolutionary than expected" and wrote that it was "fun to hear a live performance by the Pistols that doesn't degenerate into chaos and is recorded in clean audio". Robert Christgau described the album as "that rare thing, a live album with a life of its own". In March 2014, Matlock released a book about the tour, and in August 2024, Barbara Ellen of The Guardian compared the controversy surrounding the forthcoming Oasis Live '25 Tour to that of Filthy Lucre.

== Tour dates ==
List of 1996 concerts
Date	City	Country	Venue
21 June	Lahti	Finland	Messila Festival
22 June	Munich	Germany	Helter Skelter Festival
23 June	London	England	Finsbury Park
26 June	Stockholm	Sweden	Maritime Museum
28 June	Roskilde	Denmark	Roskilde Festival
30 June	St. Gallen	Switzerland	Open-Air Festival
4 July	Paris	France	Zénith Paris
6 July	Berlin	Germany	Treptow Arena
7 July	Prague	Czechia	Sports Hall
9 July	Ljubljana	Slovenia	Tivoli Hall
10 July	Rome	Italy	Curva Stadio
11 July	Milan	Italy	Parco Aquatica
13 July	Ochtrup	Germany	Munster Festival
14 July	Frankfurt	Germany	F.a.n. Frankenstolz Arena
16 July	Glasgow	Scotland	SEC Centre
17 July	London	England	Shepherd's Bush Empire
20 July	Zeebrugge	Belgium	Axion Beach Festival
21 July	Stratford-upon-Avon	England	Phoenix Festival
31 July	Denver	United States	Red Rocks Amphitheatre
2 August	Dallas	United States	Music Complex
3 August	Houston	United States	International Ballroom
4 August	Memphis	United States	Mud Island Amphitheater
6 August	Fairfax	United States	EagleBank Arena
8 August	New York	United States	Roseland Ballroom
9 August	New York	United States	Roseland Ballroom
10 August	Boston	United States	Xfinity Center
12 August	Toronto	Canada	Budweiser Stage
13 August	Cleveland	United States	Jacobs Pavilion
16 August	Detroit	United States	Huntington Place
17 August	Chicago	United States	Aragon Ballroom
18 August	Milwaukee	United States	The Rave/Eagles Club
20 August	Toronto	Canada	The Guvernment
22 August	Los Angeles	United States	Universal Amphitheatre
23 August	Los Angeles	United States	Hollywood Palladium
25 August	Los Angeles	United States	Hollywood Palladium
27 August	Mountain View	United States	Shoreline Amphitheatre
29 August	Portland	United States	Keller Auditorium
30 August	Seattle	United States	Bumbershoot
31 August	Vancouver	Canada	Pacific National Exhibition
5 October	Auckland	New Zealand	Super Top
9 October	Brisbane	Australia	Brisbane Festival Hall
11 October	Newcastle	Australia	Entertainment Centre
12 October	Sydney	Australia	Selina's Nitespot
14 October	Sydney	Australia	Hordern Pavilion
17 October	Canberra	Australia	National Convention Centre Canberra
19 October	Melbourne	Australia	Festival Hall
20 October	Melbourne	Australia	Palace Theatre
22 October	Adelaide	Australia	Thebarton Theatre
24 October	Perth	Australia	Entertainment Centre
28 October	Kanagawa	Japan	Club Citta
29 October	Kanagawa	Japan	Club Citta
31 October	Osaka	Japan	Imperial Hall
1 November	Osaka	Japan	Imperial Hall
2 November	Osaka	Japan	Imperial Hall
4 November	Tokyo	Japan	Nippon Budokan
5 November	Tokyo	Japan	Nippon Budokan
7 November	Fukuoka	Japan	Sun Palace
9 November	Nagoya	Japan	Diamond Hall
10 November	Nagoya	Japan	Diamond Hall
11 November	Nagoya	Japan	Diamond Hall
13 November	Nagoya	Japan	Diamond Hall
14 November	Nagoya	Japan	Diamond Hall
16 November	Tokyo	Japan	Nippon Budokan
17 November	Matsumoto	Japan	Syakaibunka Kaikan
19 November	Kanagawa	Japan	Club Citta
21 November	Sapporo	Japan	Nitori Culture Hall
23 November	Sendai	Japan	Sendai Sun Plaza
29 November	Rio de Janeiro	Brazil	Praça da Apoteose
30 November	São Paulo	Brazil	Pista de Atletismo Darwin Piñeyrúa
4 December	Buenos Aires	Argentina	Estadio Obras Sanitarias
5 December	Buenos Aires	Argentina	Estadio Obras Sanitarias
7 December	Santiago	Chile	Estadio Monumental David Arellano

=== Cancelled shows ===
List of 1996 concerts
Date	City	Country	Venue
17 July	Belfast	Northern Ireland	Maysfield Centre
18 July	Dublin	Ireland	Point Theatre
