= HMS Venus =

Five ships of the Royal Navy have borne the name HMS Venus, after Venus, the goddess of love in Roman mythology:

- HMS Venus (1758) was a 36-gun fifth-rate Venus-class frigate launched in 1758. She was reduced to 32 guns in 1792 and renamed HMS Heroine in 1809. She was sold in 1828.
- HMS Venus (1807) was a 36-gun fifth rate of the same name captured from the Danes in 1807. She was sold in 1815.
- HMS Venus (1820) was a 46-gun fifth rate launched in 1820. She was lent to the Marine Society between 1848 and 1862 as a training ship and was sold in 1864.
- HMS Venus (1895) was an Eclipse-class protected cruiser launched in 1895 and sold in 1921.
- HMS Venus (R50) was a V-class destroyer launched in 1943. She was converted into a Type 15 frigate between 1951 and 1952, and was sold in 1972.

== See also ==
- HM hired armed lugger Venus
- "Good Ship Venus", a drinking song
