= The Great Rock 'n' Roll Swindle (album) =

Soundtrack album by Sex Pistols
- Released: 23 February 1979
- Recorded: 1976–1978
- Genre: Punk rock; new wave; post-punk
- Length: 78:39
- Language: English; German; French
- Label: Virgin
- Producer: Dave Goodman

Sex Pistols chronology
Never Mind the Bollocks, Here's the Sex Pistols (1977)	The Great Rock 'n' Roll Swindle (1979)	Some Product: Carri on Sex Pistols (1979)

Singles from The Great Rock 'n' Roll Swindle
- 1. "No One Is Innocent" / "My Way" Released: 30 June 1978; 2. "Something Else" Released: 23 February 1979; 3. "Silly Thing" Released: 30 March 1979; 4. "C'mon Everybody" Released: 22 June 1979; 5. "The Great Rock 'n' Roll Swindle" Released: 5 October 1979; 6. "(I'm Not Your) Stepping Stone" Released: 6 June 1980

Professional ratings
Review scores
Source	Rating
AllMusic	3.5/5 stars
Christgau's Record Guide	(B+)
Rolling Stone	(Not Rated)
The Rolling Stone Album Guide	3/5 stars

The Great Rock 'n' Roll Swindle is the soundtrack album of the film of the same name by the Sex Pistols. The album was released on 23 February 1979, on Virgin Records. The album is the first since the band's debut studio album, Never Mind the Bollocks, Here's the Sex Pistols, and was their first album since they broke up a year prior.

== Production ==
By the time the soundtrack was being prepared, Johnny Rotten (Lydon) had left the band and refused to participate in the project. Manager Malcolm McLaren was left with a major problem — how to sell a double LP soundtrack with no songs featuring the Sex Pistols' dynamic, original vocalist. Desperate for a "workaround", McLaren discovered an October 1976 rehearsal session by the original lineup. In an effort to keep up their "chops", the band would rehearse during downtime at Wessex Studios while attempting to record the "Anarchy in the U.K." 7-inch single for EMI with producer Dave Goodman in October 1976. Goodman secretly caught the rehearsal on tape. The band ran through some cover songs, many of which were staples at early Sex Pistols shows, along with a few more obscure tracks. Unfortunately, the recording was raw and being a simple four-track recording, it was not suitable for commercial release. McLaren then decided to take John Lydon's vocal track along with Glen Matlock's (also long gone from the band) original bass track and combine them with newly re-recorded guitar and drum tracks performed by Steve Jones and Paul Cook. McLaren suddenly had "new" Sex Pistols material suitable for release and performed exclusively by the original lineup. Better still, fans of the band had never heard these recordings. This tactic also gave the impression that the original band was still together. McLaren used this confusion and the "new" material to market and promote not only the movie soundtrack, but the film itself. The original rehearsal recording (without the newly recorded, overdubbed tracks) eventually appeared, in its entirety, on the Sex Pistols Box Set released by Virgin Records in 2002.

The double album features a significant number of tracks that omit Lydon entirely, most of them written and recorded after he had left the band. These include Sid Vicious singing cover songs, two new original songs ("Silly Thing", sung by Cook, and "Lonely Boy", sung by Jones), tracks Cook and Jones recorded with Ronnie Biggs, the title track and "Who Killed Bambi?" sung by Edward Tudor-Pole, and numerous novelty tracks including French street musicians playing "Anarchy in the U.K." and a medley of several Sex Pistols songs covered by a disco band.

Two further tracks were recorded along with "Lonely Boy" and "Silly Thing" between May and July 1978; "Black Leather" and "Here We Go Again". While the two songs did not end up on either the film or the soundtrack, both were later released on a 7-inch single as part of the Sex Pistols "Pistols Pack" 6 single plastic wallet collection (released as a box set in Greece), as well as on the Japanese The Very Best Of Sex Pistols LP.

Along with Rotten, people who sang on The Great Rock 'n' Roll Swindle include:

- Paul Cook – lead vocals on "Silly Thing" (1978), backing vocals on "The Great Rock 'n' Roll Swindle" (1979)
- Steve Jones – lead vocals on "Lonely Boy", backing vocals on "The Great Rock 'n' Roll Swindle", lead vocals on "EMI (Orch)", lead vocals on "Friggin' in the Riggin'" and lead vocals on the single release of "Silly Thing" (1978)
- Ronnie Biggs – lead vocals on "No One Is Innocent", "Belsen Vos a Gassa" (1978)
- Malcolm McLaren – lead vocals on "You Need Hands", "God Save The Queen (Symphony)" (1979)
- Edward Tudor-Pole – lead vocals on "Rock Around the Clock", "Who Killed Bambi", "The Great Rock 'n' Roll Swindle" (1979)
- Sid Vicious – lead vocals on "My Way", "C'mon Everybody", "Something Else" (1978)

This album would be the last compiled recordings to feature Sid Vicious in the studio due to his death three weeks before the album's release and after only playing an overdubbed bass guitar on "Bodies" on the Never Mind the Bollocks album would also be his sole studio recordings as a vocalist (his subsequent appearances as a singer would be only in live recordings of concerts recorded in the months leading up to his death). This would also be the first set of recordings to feature guitarist Steve Jones and drummer Paul Cook in roles as lead vocalists before they would form the Professionals, and the final album of new material credited to the Sex Pistols, albeit it technically not being a second studio album due to various guests and other artist featuring on it.

== Variations ==
The album has been released in different variations featuring different track listings. There have been two main versions, which were featured on double-album vinyl and CD. The biggest differences between the track lists is that the songs are re-arranged and version A features "Watcha Gonna Do About It" and the Dave Goodman produced version of "Anarchy in the UK" (known as the 'vinyl quotation'mix), while version B features "I Wanna Be Me" and the Chris Thomas produced version of "Anarchy in the UK". A 2012 reissue by Universal incorporates both track lists, as it features the Version A track list with "I Wanna Be Me" added on to the end.

Additionally, a single-album version was released in May 1980 to tie in with the release of the film, and featured a different cover and a pared-down track list, which excluded all of Johnny Rotten's tracks. Early releases came with a copy of the film poster.

== Track listing ==
Version A
No.	Title	Writer(s)	Vocals	Length
1.	"God Save the Queen" (orchestral rendition with spoken word over the music about how punk rock and the Sex Pistols were "invented" (alternate title: God Save The Queen (Symphony)")	Johnny Rotten, Steve Jones, Glen Matlock, Paul Cook	Malcolm McLaren	3:23
2.	"Johnny B Goode"	Chuck Berry	Johnny Rotten	2:36
3.	"Roadrunner"	Jonathan Richman	Johnny Rotten	3:47
4.	"Black Arabs" (disco medley, includes "Anarchy in the UK", "God Save the Queen", "Pretty Vacant" and "No One is Innocent")	Rotten, Jones, Matlock, Cook, Ronnie Biggs	Black Arabs	4:51
5.	"Anarchy in the UK" (Mike Thorne remix (beefed up drums) of previously unreleased session from October 1976)	Rotten, Jones, Matlock, Cook	Johnny Rotten	4:00
6.	"Substitute"	Pete Townshend	Johnny Rotten	3:10
7.	"Don't Give Me No Lip, Child" (cover of Dave Berry, 1964)	Barry Richards, Jean Thomas, Don Thomas	Johnny Rotten	3:27
8.	"(I'm Not Your) Steppin' Stone"	Tommy Boyce, Bobby Hart	Johnny Rotten	3:06
9.	"L'Anarchie pour le UK" (performed by a trio of French street musicians with accordion and fiddle, lyrics translated by Louis Brennon. (alternate title: "Anarchie pour le UK"))	Rotten, Jones, Matlock, Cook	Jerzimy	3:28
10.	"Belsen Was a Gas" (alternate title: "Einmal war Belsen Vortrefflich")	Rotten, Jones, Sid Vicious, Cook	Johnny Rotten	2:12
11.	"Belsen Vos a Gassa" (alternate title: "Einmal war Belsen wirklich Vortrefflich")	Rotten, Jones, Vicious, Cook	Ronnie Biggs	2:17
12.	"Silly Thing"	Jones, Cook	Paul Cook	2:51
13.	"My Way"	Paul Anka, Claude François, Jacques Revaux	Sid Vicious	4:06
14.	"I Wanna Be Me"	Matlock, Cook, Jones, Rotten	Johnny Rotten	3:03
15.	"Something Else"	Bob Cochran, Sharon Sheeley	Sid Vicious	2:14
16.	"Rock Around the Clock"	Max C. Freedman, James E. Myers	Edward Tudor-Pole	2:04
17.	"Lonely Boy"	Jones, Cook	Steve Jones	3:07
18.	"No One Is Innocent"	Jones, Cook, Biggs	Ronnie Biggs	3:04
19.	"C'mon Everybody"	Eddie Cochran, Jerry Capehart	Sid Vicious	1:56
20.	"EMI" (orchestral rendition with Steve Jones speaking the lyrics (alternate title: "EMI (Orch)"))	Rotten, Jones, Matlock, Cook	Steve Jones	3:44
21.	"The Great Rock 'n' Roll Swindle"	Jones, Cook, Julien Temple	Edward Tudor-Pole, Steve Jones, Paul Cook & others	4:21
22.	"Friggin' in the Riggin'"	Traditional; arranged by Jones	Steve Jones	3:37
23.	"You Need Hands"	Max Bygraves	Malcolm McLaren	2:54
24.	" Who Killed Bambi?"	Edward Tudor-Pole, Vivienne Westwood	Edward Tudor-Pole	3:07

Version B
No.	Title	Writer(s)	Vocals	Length
1.	"God Save the Queen (Symphony)" (orchestral rendition with spoken word over the music about how punk rock and the Sex Pistols were "invented")	Johnny Rotten, Steve Jones, Glen Matlock, Paul Cook	Malcolm McLaren	3:23
2.	"Rock Around the Clock"	Max C. Freedman, James E. Myers	Edward Tudor-Pole	2:04
3.	"Johnny B Goode"	Chuck Berry	Johnny Rotten	2:36
4.	"Roadrunner"	Jonathan Richman	Johnny Rotten	3:47
5.	"Black Arabs" (disco medley, includes "Anarchy in the UK", "God Save the Queen", "Pretty Vacant" and "No One is Innocent")	Rotten, Jones, Matlock, Cook, Ronnie Biggs	Black Arabs	4:51
6.	"Watcha Gonna Do About It?"	Ian Samwell, Steve Marriott, Ronnie Lane	Johnny Rotten	1:55
7.	"Anarchy in the UK" (Chris Thomas produced version of "Anarchy in the UK", the 7" single version)	Rotten, Jones, Matlock, Cook	Johnny Rotten	3:32
8.	"Silly Thing"	Jones, Cook	Paul Cook	2:51
9.	"Substitute"	Pete Townshend	Johnny Rotten	3:10
10.	"Don't Give Me No Lip, Child"	Barry Richards, Jean Thomas, Don Thomas	Johnny Rotten	3:27
11.	"(I'm Not Your) Steppin' Stone"	Tommy Boyce, Bobby Hart	Johnny Rotten	3:06
12.	"Lonely Boy"	Jones, Cook	Steve Jones	3:07
13.	"Something Else"	Bob Cochran, Sharon Sheeley	Sid Vicious	2:14
14.	"L'Anarchie pour le UK" (performed by a trio of French street musicians with accordion and fiddle, lyrics translated by Louis Brennon. (alternate title: "Anarchie pour le UK"))	Rotten, Jones, Matlock, Cook	Jerzimy	3:28
15.	"Einmal war Belsen Vortrefflich"	Rotten, Jones, Sid Vicious, Cook	Johnny Rotten	2:12
16.	"Einmal war Belsen wirklich Vortrefflich"	Rotten, Jones, Vicious, Cook	Ronnie Biggs	2:17
17.	"No One Is Innocent"	Jones, Cook, Biggs	Ronnie Biggs	3:04
18.	"My Way"	Paul Anka, Claude François, Jacques Revaux	Sid Vicious	4:06
19.	"C'mon Everybody"	Eddie Cochran, Jerry Capehart	Sid Vicious	1:56
20.	"EMI (Orch)" (orchestral rendition with Steve Jones speaking the lyrics)	Rotten, Jones, Matlock, Cook	Steve Jones	3:44
21.	"The Great Rock 'n' Roll Swindle"	Jones, Cook, Julien Temple	Edward Tudor-Pole, Steve Jones, Paul Cook & others	4:21
22.	"You Need Hands"	Max Bygraves	Malcolm McLaren	2:54
23.	"Friggin' in the Riggin'"	Traditional; arranged by Jones	Steve Jones	3:37

Single-album version
No.	Title	Length
1.	"God Save the Queen (Symphony)"	3:23
2.	"The Great Rock 'n' Roll Swindle"	4:21
3.	"You Need Hands"	2:54
4.	"Silly Thing"	2:51
5.	"Lonely Boy"	3:07
6.	"Something Else"	2:14
7.	"Rock Around the Clock"	2:04
8.	"C'mon Everybody"	1:56
9.	"Who Killed Bambi?"	3:07
10.	"No One Is Innocent"	3:04
11.	"L'Anarchie pour le UK"	3:28
12.	"My Way"	4:06

2012 re-release
No.	Title	Writer(s)	Vocals	Length
1.	"God Save the Queen" (orchestral rendition)	Johnny Rotten, Steve Jones, Glen Matlock, Paul Cook		3:23
2.	"Johnny B Goode"	Chuck Berry	Johnny Rotten	2:36
3.	"Roadrunner"	Jonathan Richman	Johnny Rotten	3:47
4.	"Black Arabs" (disco medley, includes "Anarchy in the UK", "God Save the Queen", "Pretty Vacant" and "No One is Innocent")	Rotten, Jones, Matlock, Cook, Ronnie Biggs	Black Arabs	4:51
5.	"Anarchy in the UK" (Mike Thorne remix (beef-ed up drums) of previously unreleased session from October 1976)	Rotten, Jones, Matlock, Cook	Johnny Rotten	4:00
6.	"Substitute"	Pete Townshend	Johnny Rotten	3:10
7.	"Don't Give Me No Lip, Child" (cover of Dave Berry, 1964)	Barry Richards, Jean Thomas, Don Thomas	Johnny Rotten	3:27
8.	"(I'm Not Your) Steppin' Stone"	Tommy Boyce, Bobby Hart	Johnny Rotten	3:06
9.	"L'Anarchie pour le UK" (performed by a trio of French street musicians with accordion and fiddle, lyrics translated by Louis Brennon. (alternate title: "Anarchie pour le UK"))	Rotten, Jones, Matlock, Cook	Jerzimy	3:28
10.	"Belsen Was a Gas" (alternate title: "Einmal war Belsen Vortrefflich")	Rotten, Jones, Sid Vicious, Cook	Johnny Rotten	2:12
11.	"Belsen Vos a Gassa" (alternate title: "Einmal war Belsen wirklich Vortrefflich")	Rotten, Jones, Vicious, Cook	Ronnie Biggs	2:17
12.	"Silly Thing"	Jones, Cook	Paul Cook	2:51
13.	"My Way"	Paul Anka, Claude François, Jacques Revaux	Sid Vicious	4:06
14.	"I Wanna Be Me"	Matlock, Cook, Jones, Rotten	Johnny Rotten	3:03
15.	"Something Else"	Eddie Cochran, Sharon Sheeley	Sid Vicious	2:14
16.	"Rock Around the Clock"	Max C. Freedman, James E. Myers	Edward Tudor-Pole	2:04
17.	"Lonely Boy"	Jones, Cook	Steve Jones	3:07
18.	"No One Is Innocent"	Jones, Cook, Biggs	Ronnie Biggs	3:04
19.	"C'mon Everybody"	Eddie Cochran, Jerry Capehart	Sid Vicious	1:56
20.	"EMI" (orchestral rendition with Steve Jones speaking the lyrics (alternate title: "EMI (Orch)"))	Rotten, Jones, Matlock, Cook	Steve Jones	3:44
21.	"The Great Rock 'n' Roll Swindle"	Jones, Cook, Julien Temple	Edward Tudor-Pole, Steve Jones, Paul Cook & others	4:21
22.	"Friggin' in the Riggin'"	Traditional; arranged by Jones	Steve Jones	3:37
23.	"You Need Hands"	Max Bygraves	Malcolm McLaren	2:54
24.	"Who Killed Bambi?"	Edward Tudor-Pole, Vivienne Westwood	Edward Tudor-Pole	3:07
25.	"Watcha Gonna Do About It?"	Ian Samwell, Brian Potter	Johnny Rotten	2:00

== Charts ==
Chart (1979)	Peak Position
UK Albums Chart	7
Australia (Kent Music Report)	44

== Certifications ==
Region	Certification	Certified units/sales
United Kingdom (BPI)	Gold	100,000^{^}
United Kingdom (BPI) 1993 release	Gold	100,000^{*}
^{*} Sales figures based on certification alone.^{^} Shipments figures based on certification alone.

== Song notes ==
"Johnny B Goode", "Roadrunner", "Anarchy in the UK", "Substitute", "Don't Give Me No Lip, Child", "(I'm Not) Your Stepping Stone", "I Wanna Be Me" and "Watcha Gonna Do About It?" were originally recorded in October 1976. Instrumental tracks for some of these were re-recorded in 1978 by Jones and Cook.
