= Bodies (Sex Pistols song) =

1977 song by Sex Pistols

Song by Sex Pistols

from the album Never Mind the Bollocks, Here's the Sex Pistols
- Released: 28 October 1977 (UK); 11 November 1977 (US)
- Recorded: August 1977
- Studio: Wessex, London
- Genre: Punk rock
- Length: 3:03
- Label: Virgin (UK); Warner Bros. Records (US)
- Songwriters: Johnny Rotten; Steve Jones; Sid Vicious; Paul Cook
- Producers: Chris Thomas; Bill Price

"Bodies" is a song by the Sex Pistols, from their 1977 album Never Mind the Bollocks, Here's the Sex Pistols. The song tackles the subject of abortion with lyrics described as "some of the most uncompromising, gut-wrenching lyrics imaginable".

== Lyrical content ==
The lyrics contain very graphic imagery about a terminated foetus and feature a great deal of profanity for the time: the third and final verse begins with a couplet in which the word fuck is repeated five times in rapid succession.

The song is mostly about a fan named Pauline, who was (as the song states) from Birmingham. She had been in a mental institution, where she apparently lived in a tree house in its garden. This was where the line 'Her name was Pauline, she lived in a tree' comes from. The institution was also where she seems to have been horrifically raped by one of the male nurses. When she was released, she travelled to London, where she became a punk rock fan. She had several abortions. According to John Lydon, she showed up once at his door wearing nothing but a clear plastic bag and holding an aborted foetus. This was re-iterated in the 2002 Classic Albums documentary when discussing Bodies. In a 1977 interview, when asked about the backstory of the song, Lydon also claimed that she was arrested after entering a discotheque with the aborted foetus.

According to Lydon's autobiography, she told Lydon about becoming pregnant and then having abortions and she described them in detail to him. This profoundly affected Lydon enough to write the song. Most of the band also had experiences with Pauline, but have spoken less about it. Steve Jones claims he had sex with her: "I'm glad I found out the story afterwards, about the abortion".

== Reception ==
With its repeated mentions of "I'm not an animal," of "Mummy," and of a dying baby, the song has been interpreted as anti-abortion, music critic Robert Christgau contemporarily calling it "effectively anti-abortion, anti-woman, and anti-sex." In 2006, National Review magazine put the song at #8 on its list of the "50 Greatest Conservative Rock songs", due to its negative and unflinching description of abortion. Lydon himself, in a 2007 interview with Spin Magazine, said "I don't think there's a clearer song about the pain of abortion. The juxtaposition of all those different psychic things in your head and all the confusion, the anger, the frustration, you have to capture in those words." In the BBC-screened documentary series Classic Albums (2002) featuring The Sex Pistols' "Never Mind The Bollocks" album, Lydon further said: "That song was hated and loathed. It's not anti-abortion, it's not pro-abortion. It's: 'Think about it. Don't be callous about a human being, but don't be limited about a thing as 'morals' either. Because it's immoral to bring a kid in this world and not give a toss about it.'"

Along with the later "Belsen Was a Gas," it is probably the most graphic and controversial Sex Pistols song in both its subject matter and style. A 2017 article in The Independent described the song as "a gurgling bloody depiction of an abortion replete with a volley of expletives from Rotten". Musically, it is also the fastest and heaviest song in the Sex Pistols canon — characterized by thudding drums, droning buzzsaw guitar, and shouted vocals.

== Recording ==
"Bodies" is one of two songs on Never Mind the Bollocks, Here's the Sex Pistols which original Pistols bassist Glen Matlock did not co-write. It is also one of only two songs on the album on which Sid Vicious recorded bass, although his part was later overdubbed by Steve Jones, after Matlock refused to return to play the part. The song was, like all other Sex Pistols songs, credited to the entire band, though Vicious was in the hospital with hepatitis when the band finished it.

== Other versions ==
The Sex Pistols' album Filthy Lucre Live - recorded at Finsbury Park, London on 23 June 1996, and released on 29 July that year - includes a performance of "Bodies." This same performance is a B-side on the "Pretty Vacant (live)" single, under the title "Buddies," and is a different mix from the track on the live album (the audience noise is mixed much higher, with John Lydon's vocal barely audible under the audience singing the first verse). "Buddies" is a bonus track on the Japanese edition of Filthy Lucre Live.

In the film Sid and Nancy the title characters, played by Gary Oldman and Chloe Webb, sing the song for the siblings of Nancy Spungen to their delight and to the horror of their parents.

In 2005, a "barnyard" arrangement by Steve Jones and Scott Weiland was performed on Jones' radio show, with the use of the word "fuck" changed to "pluck".

The song has been covered by Liam Gallagher, Veruca Salt, Velvet Revolver, Suede, The Almighty, Killing Joke, Sepultura, Raimundos and Peppermint Creeps.
