= Some Product: Carri on Sex Pistols =

Some Product Carri on Sex Pistols

Live album by Sex Pistols
- Released: 27 July 1979
- Genres: Spoken word, sound collage
- Length: 41:32
- Labels: Virgin (UK); Warner Bros. Records (US)
- Producer: John Varnom

Sex Pistols chronology
The Great Rock 'n' Roll Swindle (1979)	Some Product Carri on Sex Pistols (1979)	Flogging a Dead Horse (1980)

Some Product: Carri on Sex Pistols is an interview album featuring members of the Sex Pistols. The interviews are mostly presented in a collage style.

== Content ==
All tracks are spoken word collages put together by John Varnom from various interviews and radio ads. Additional material includes a snippet from Tubular Bells.

The artwork was done by artist Jamie Reid.

The title melds the British comedy series of Carry On films with a pun on the word carrion.

== Release ==
Professional ratings
Review scores
Source	Rating
AllMusic	2/5 stars
Smash Hits	9/10

The album peaked at No. 6 in the UK Albums Chart.

== Track listing ==
1. "The Very Name 'Sex Pistols'" (various artists) – 5:27
2. "From Beyond the Grave" (Sid Vicious) – 8:27
3. "Big Tits Across America" (Paul Cook and Steve Jones from US radio broadcast) – 11:19
4. "The Complex World of John Rotten" (Johnny Rotten, features interview snippets with John Lydon's Mother) – 8:18
5. "Sex Pistols Will Play" (Paul Cook and Steve Jones) – 3:21
6. "Is the Queen a Moron?" (Sex Pistols interview regarding 'God Save the Queen' lyrics) – 3:55
7. "The Fucking Rotter" (Sex Pistols) – 0:41 (This is an edited version of the infamous Bill Grundy interview.)

== Certifications ==
Region	Certification	Certified units/sales
United Kingdom (BPI)	Silver	60,000^{^}
^{^} Shipments figures based on certification alone.
