= Sharon Sheeley =

American singer-songwriter

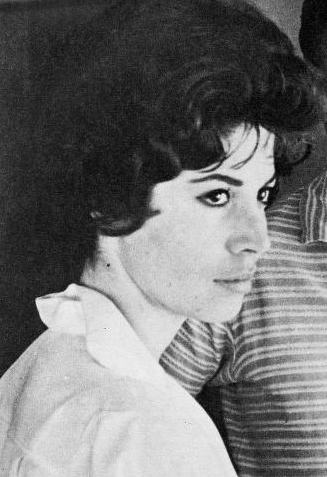
- Sheeley in 1961

Background information
- Born: Sharon Kathleen Sheeley; April 4, 1940; Newport Beach, California, U.S.
- Died: May 17, 2002 (aged 62) Los Angeles, California, U.S.
- Genres: Pop music
- Occupations: Composer; songwriter
- Spouse: Jimmy O'Neill (m. 1961; div. 1966)

Sharon Kathleen Sheeley (April 4, 1940 – May 17, 2002) was an American songwriter who wrote songs for Glen Campbell, Ricky Nelson, Brenda Lee, and Eddie Cochran.

== Biography ==
Sheeley attended Newport Harbor High School in Newport Beach, and briefly worked as a teen model. She went to Hollywood to meet the stars and write songs. Her first song, "Poor Little Fool", was recorded by Ricky Nelson in 1958, and became Nelson's first US No. 1 and the Billboard Hot 100's first No. 1. At age 18, Sheeley was the youngest woman to write an American number-one hit.

Jerry Capehart, the manager and songwriting partner of Eddie Cochran, then agreed to look after Sheeley's interests, and she and Cochran began a relationship. She wrote "Love Again" and "Cherished Memories" for Cochran and the 1959 hit "Somethin' Else" with Eddie's brother Bill Cochran. Her other songwriting credits included "Hurry Up", recorded by Ritchie Valens.

In April 1960, she traveled to United Kingdom to join Cochran and Gene Vincent, who were touring there. She and Cochran were reported as being "unofficially engaged". She recorded a song, "Homework", with producer Jack Good. On the night of April 16, 1960, Sheeley, Vincent and Cochran were traveling in a private hire taxi from a concert in Bristol to London Heathrow Airport when it slammed into a lamp post near Chippenham. All three were rushed to a hospital. Cochran, who had been thrown from the vehicle, suffered fatal brain injuries and died the next day, at the age of 21. Sheeley suffered a broken pelvis, and Vincent broke his ribs and collarbone and added further damage to his already weak leg.

Following the accident she returned to the US, where she collaborated with musician-songwriter Jackie DeShannon on a string of hits, including Brenda Lee's "Dum Dum" and "Heart in Hand", The Fleetwoods' "(He's) The Great Imposter" and Irma Thomas's "Breakaway". She also co-wrote songs with Chris Curtis of The Searchers, including "Night Time" recorded by Paul and Barry Ryan.

In 1961, Sheeley married Los Angeles radio personality Jimmy O'Neill. The two created the ABC TV series Shindig! (1964–1966). They divorced five years after marrying, but remained friends. After her divorce, Sheeley moved away from the music scene, apart from some public appearances at Eddie Cochran conventions in the 1990s. In August 2000, RPM Records released a collection of her songs that were recorded in the early 1960s by session musicians, including Glen Campbell, Delaney Bramlett, Leon Russell, David Gates, Hal Blaine and Herb Alpert.

== Death ==
Five days after suffering a cerebral hemorrhage, Sheeley died on May 17, 2002, at Sherman Oaks Hospital Medical Center in Los Angeles at the age of 62. She has a cenotaph marker next to Eddie Cochran at Forest Lawn Memorial Park Cypress, in Orange County, California.

== Media ==
In 1988, Levi Strauss & Co. promoted their Levi's 501 range with a television commercial called "Eddie Cochran", directed by Syd Macartney. It told the story of how Sheeley (played by actress Sharon Devlin) attracted Cochran at a party by wearing said product. It was seemingly narrated by Sheeley and the background song, "C'mon Everybody", was released as a promotional single, followed by a compilation album of Cochran's hits.

Sheeley was depicted by Rosanna Locke in the 1987 film La Bamba.

== Bibliography ==
- Sheeley, Sharon (2010). Summertime Blues. Ravenhawk Books. ISBN 978-1-893660-18-2.
