= Good Ship Venus =

Traditional song

"Good Ship Venus", also known as "Friggin' in the Riggin'", is a bawdy drinking song devised to shock with ever increasingly lewd and debauched sexual descriptions of the eponymous ship's loose-moralled crew, often including depictions of sodomy, bestiality, and injuries to genitals. The tune usually used (especially for the chorus) is "Go In and Out the Window".

== Lyrics ==
The opening verse is typically something along the lines of:

'Twas on the good ship Venus,
By Christ you should have seen us,
The figurehead
Was a whore in bed,
And the mast a rampant penis.

However, the lyrics exist in numerous variations. For example, the last line varies, being substituted with any of a large variety of phrases such as 'Our crest a rampant penis' or 'Sucking a dead man's penis'. Sometimes this opening verse will be used as the chorus (such as in Oscar Brand's version), sometimes the song will have no chorus (such as Loudon Wainwright's version) sometimes (such as in the Sex Pistols version and all others titled "Friggin' in the Riggin') the chorus will be as follows (sometimes saying "fuck-all" instead of "nothing"):

'Friggin' in the riggin'
Friggin' in the riggin'
Friggin' in the riggin'
There's nothing else to do

The usual rhyming structure for this song is the limerick AABBA structure.

A few other verses:

The Captain's wife was Mabel
She was ready, willing and able
On the floor, behind the door
Or under the kitchen table.

The first mate's name was Carter
By gad he was a farter!
When the wind wouldn't blow
And the ship wouldn't go
They'd get Carter the farter to start her.

The second mate's name was Topper
By Christ he had a whopper!
Once around the deck
Twice around his neck
And up his arse for a stopper.

== Origin ==
It is possible that this song was inspired by an actual event, where a female convict (Charlotte Badger), sailing on the colonial brigantine Venus, persuaded members of the crew to commandeer the vessel, sailing from Port Dalrymple, Tasmania, (now part of George Town, Tasmania) in 1806.

Despite various reports, the ultimate fate of the Venus is unknown. This may have led to speculation by those left behind, with fantasies leading to the creation of this drinking song. One of the verses also refers to a 'Charlotte':

The captain's daughter Charlotte
Was born and bred a harlot
Her thighs at night
Were lily white
By morning they were scarlet.

== HMS Venus, RN ==
Five ships of the Royal Navy have borne the name HMS Venus between 1758 and 1972. The most recent was a destroyer launched in 1943, which was converted into a fast frigate in 1951, and served during the 1950s and 1960s. (She was a sister ship of HMS Troubridge, whose name inspired the fictional "HMS Troutbridge" in the long-running BBC radio comedy The Navy Lark of the same period).

== Recordings ==
"Friggin' in the Riggin'"

Song by Sex Pistols

from the album The Great Rock 'n' Roll Swindle
- Released: 26 February 1979
- Recorded: 1979
- Genre: Punk rock
- Length: 3:37
- Label: Virgin
- Songwriters: Traditional; arranged by Steve Jones
- Producer: Dave Goodman

Notable recordings include the Oscar Brand 1952 version (recording "Good Ship Venus" and "Friggin' In The Riggin" as separate songs), and the British punk band Sex Pistols, which appears on their Great Rock 'n' Roll Swindle album, and appears as the finale track in the film of the same name. Released as part of a double-A side, it reached No. 3 in the UK singles chart in 1979 and was the band's biggest-selling single.

When a ship was required in The Goon Show it was often named the "Good Ship Venus" or "HMS Venus", one of several references to dirty jokes the Goons managed to get past the 1950s BBC censors.

The American thrash metal band Anthrax covered the Sex Pistols' version, but with different lyrics. In 2006 Loudon Wainwright III recorded it on the compilation album Rogue's Gallery: Pirate Ballads, Sea Songs, and Chanteys. The American punk band Showcase Showdown also released a version of the song on a tribute to the Sex Pistols.

Serbian punk rock musician Toni Montano recorded a song to the tune of the Sex Pistols version, with lyrics in the Serbian language, entitled "Frigidna je bila" (although the lyrics had no relation to the original).

In Ken Russell's 2005 "Hot Pants Trilogy", "The Goodship Venus" short was billed as a musical trip around Cape Horn with "as horny a crew of sex-crazed sailors who ever sailed the seven seas." The trilogy received its world premiere at the Oldenburg Festival, Germany in September 2005.

== In popular culture ==
- The chorus from the Sex Pistols' version of the song was used in the opening titles of the Channel 4 situation comedy Captain Butler; minor variations to the words (in spoken form) were added, notably by the series' lead actor Craig Charles.
- A Royal Navy ship Venus is the setting of the film Carry On Jack.
- In the television series Man About the House, George Roper tried to teach his budgerigar 'Oscar' the song "On Board the Good Ship Venus" in the episode "One More for the Pot" (Season 6, Episode 2).
- Mentioned by Inspector Fowler in The Thin Blue Line episode "Rag Week" (Season 1, Episode 4). When explaining the ins and outs of relevant procedures, should one of his force "arrest the rugby team for using obscene language", he warned that the arresting police officer would find themselves "having to recite the lyrics of 'The Good Ship Venus'" - that is, will be asked to voice in court all the words said rugby team was using.
