= The Strand (band) =

- Guitarist Wally Nightingale

Background information
- Also known as: The Swankers
- Origin: Shepherd's Bush, London, England
- Years active: 1972-1975
- Spinoffs: Sex Pistols
- Past members: Steve Jones; Wally Nightingale; Paul Cook; Stephen Hayes; Jim Mackin; Del Noones; Glen Matlock

The Strand (also known as The Swankers) were a British rock band, formed in 1972, which later spun-off to become the Sex Pistols, with Steve Jones, Paul Cook, and Glen Matlock playing in both groups. Active from 1972-1975, they played mostly cover songs, but wrote an early version of “Did You No Wrong”, which with new lyrics would become the b-side to the Sex Pistols single “God Save The Queen”.

== History ==
=== Active period ===
In 1972, at the end of their school years at Christopher Wren Boys' School, in Shepherd's Bush, Wally Nightingale told his classmates Paul Cook and Steve Jones that they should start a band. The three called themselves The Strand, after Roxy Music's song "Do the Strand"; Jones was the singer, Nightingale played guitar, Stephen Hayes played bass, Cook was the drummer, and Jim Mackin played organ.

Jones and Nightingale stole high-quality instruments and equipment from professional headline musical acts (including Bob Marley, Rod Stewart, and David Bowie) by breaking into venues where they were due to perform, and the band began rehearsing at Nightingale's home in East Acton during the day when his parents were out at work. A few weeks into the band, Hayes was asked to leave. He later claimed that this was because equipment went missing, which he blamed on the band's manager (Nightingale's father). He was replaced by new bassist Del Noones (Paul Cook's brother-in-law),

By late 1974, the band had begun rehearsing at one of the sound stages of Riverside Studios where Nightingale's father was working. Noones was fired from the band for not attending rehearsals; and was replaced by Glen Matlock, a part-time shop assistant at Malcolm McLaren's clothing shop, where Jones and Cook had begun socialising.

By early 1975, Bernie Rhodes had shown an interest in managing the band (which was now called The Swankers). Their only public performance was in early 1975 at a birthday party for one of Cook's friends in Chelsea, held at a café on King's Road. The band played mainly cover versions of other artists work (including The Valentinos' "It's All Over Now", Small Faces' "All or Nothing" and "Whatcha Gonna Do About It", and The Who's "Substitute"), but had at least one original song called "Scarface", with music by Nightingale and lyrics written by Nightingale's father. Unhappy with the lyrics, it was later re-written as "Did You No Wrong".

Impressed by McLaren's prior involvement with the New York Dolls, Jones repeatedly requested that he become the band's manager, and in mid-1975 he agreed. However, McLaren thought Nightingale did not fit the image of the band he had in mind, and told Jones and Cook he would only manage them if they fired Nightingale. Jones, who did not feel comfortable in the singer's role, had been covertly working hard for several months to learn to play guitar. Nightingale was informed that he was being fired upon his arrival for a rehearsal.

=== Aftermath ===
With Nightingale gone, the group became known as QT Jones & his Sex Pistols at McLaren's suggestion, but the name was soon shortened to the Sex Pistols. McLaren began looking for a new singer, and settled on John Lydon, who frequently hung around his shop. The Sex Pistols played their first gig on 6 November 1975 at the St Martins school of art, six months after Nightingale's departure. In a later interview Nightingale recalled watching them perform at the 100 Club, commenting "[Jones and Cook] wouldn't even talk to me. In hindsight I suppose I'm proud to have been involved in the punk scene, though I don't go around telling everyone of it. After I left [the band], Steve and the others slagged me off in the music press really badly. I never really knew why, I never did them any harm." However, with regard to his views in retrospect on McLaren's part in removing him from the band, in the same interview Nightingale stated: "McLaren was devious and clever. He'd see things which other people didn't see, and I suppose that's what gave him his edge. Malcolm made the Sex Pistols."

Jones' lyrics to "Did You No Wrong" were subsequently changed when it was played by the Sex Pistols, but Nightingale's musical arrangement remained the same, and the song was released as the b-side to their 1976 single “God Save The Queen”, with lyrics rewritten by Lydon.

After his father's death in 1981, Nightingale developed an addiction to narcotics, and was subsequently imprisoned in the early 1980s for six months for a conviction associated with it. His subsequent public musical appearances were rare and sporadic, appearing as a one-off guest guitarist with the Brentwood punk rock band Beat of the Beast in 1989. In November 1995 he played guitar on the song "Rich Girls" on Mat Sargent's Sex, Drugs & HIV album. During the same month he also performed live with the HIV charity awareness project band the Rock'n'Roll Gypsies.

Nightingale died on 6 May 1996, of a drug-related illness at the age of 40. According to Hayes and Jones, Mackin has also passed away.

== Band members ==
- Steve Jones - vocals (1972-1975)
- Wally Nightingale - guitar (1972-1975)
- Paul Cook - drums (1972-1975)
- Stephen Hayes - bass (1972)
- Jim Mackin - organ
- Del Noones - bass (1972-1974)
- Glen Matlock - bass (1974-1975)
