= The Great Rock 'n' Roll Swindle =

- Theatrical release poster
- Directed by: Julien Temple
- Written by: Julien Temple
- Produced by: Don Boyd; Jeremy Thomas
- Starring: Malcolm McLaren; Steve Jones; Paul Cook; Sid Vicious; Johnny Rotten; Mary Millington; Irene Handl
- Narrated by: Malcolm McLaren
- Music by: Sex Pistols
- Distributed by: Virgin Films
- Release date: 15 May 1980
- Running time: 103 minutes
- Country: United Kingdom
- Language: English

The Great Rock 'n' Roll Swindle, also known as The Great Rock and Roll Swindle, is a 1980 British mockumentary film directed by Julien Temple and produced by Don Boyd and Jeremy Thomas. It centres on the British punk rock band Sex Pistols and, most prominently, their manager Malcolm McLaren.

== Plot ==
Guitarist Steve Jones plays a shady private detective who through a series of set piece acts uncovers the truth about the band. Drummer Paul Cook and bass guitarist Sid Vicious play smaller roles, and the band's manager, Malcolm McLaren, is featured as "The Embezzler", the man who manipulates the Sex Pistols. Fugitive train robber Ronnie Biggs, performer Edward Tudor-Pole, sex film star Mary Millington, and actresses Irene Handl and Liz Fraser also make appearances. Singer and frontman Johnny Rotten refused to have anything to do with the film, stating that it was "a pile of rubbish" and "Malcolm's vision of what he believed; not true in any form".

The movie tells a stylised fictional account of the formation, rise and subsequent break-up of the band, from the point of view of their then manager, McLaren, and it begins with a bonfire of Sex Pistols merchandise. In the film McLaren claims to have created the Sex Pistols (in truth, they were already formed, and Jones and Cook asked him to be their manager), and manipulated them to the top of the music business, using them as puppets to both further his own agenda (in his own words: "Cash from chaos"), and to claim the financial rewards from the various record labels the band were signed to during their brief existence as EMI, A&M, Virgin, and Warner Bros. Records.

== Cast ==
- Malcolm McLaren as The Embezzler
- Steve Jones as The Crook
- Paul Cook as The Tea-Maker
- Sid Vicious as The Gimmick
- Johnny Rotten as The Collaborator (archive footage)
- Ronnie Biggs as The Exile
- Irene Handl as cinema usherette
- Mary Millington as Mary
- Liz Fraser as woman in cinema
- Jess Conrad as Jess
- Helen of Troy as Helen
- Edward Tudor-Pole as Tadpole
- James Aubrey as B.J.
- Johnny Shannon as Ed Bird
- Faye Hart as Secretary
- Judy Croll as Soo Catwoman (uncredited)
- Peter Dean as nightclub bouncer (uncredited)
- James Jeter as Martin Bormann (uncredited)
- Dave Dee as himself (musician)
- Alan Jones as himself (reporter)

== Background ==
The film was initially conceived by manager Malcolm McLaren as way to break into the American market, preferring it over the release of an album or Single. And due to the bands fondness of Beyond the Valley of the Dolls, Russ Meyer was signed on as director, bringing in Roger Ebert as the films writer.

Ebert eventually came up with the screenplays Anarchy in the UK which at his request was changed to Who killed Bambi? referencing a scene in the film in which a deer is killed, as well as the song of the same name which was to be featured in the film but eventually ended up, like with many parts from it, in the Swindle.

Eventually, the film fell to ruin, after many clashes between Meyer and McLaren, culminating in a disastrous first day of shooting in which McClaren was unable to pay for Electricians on the film, having Meyer and his crew dropping out almost immediately. Soon enough, Julien Temple was brought on after having produced a series of short films on the Pistols, working with some of the material produced for Who killed Bambi?

The title of the film was inspired by an article written by skiffle musician Lonnie Donegan in the 1950s titled "Rock and Roll – It's a Swindle". A copy of the article resides in the Jamie Reid archive at the Victoria and Albert Museum in London.

The footage was filmed in early to mid-1978, between the departure of singer John Lydon from the band and their subsequent split. The movie was finally released nearly two years later. Lydon (who was listed in the credits as "The Collaborator") and original bass guitarist Glen Matlock only appear in archive footage — Lydon refused to have anything to do with the production.

== Release and reception ==
The film was shown at the wake of Joy Division frontman Ian Curtis after his 1980 suicide.

The 2000 documentary The Filth and the Fury, also directed by Julien Temple, re-tells the story of the Sex Pistols from the perspective of the band, thus serving as a response to and rebuttal of McLaren's insistence that he was the driving creative force of the band.

Filmink called it "hugely entertaining, endlessly fascinating."

== Home media releases ==
"The Swindle Continues in Your Own Home" was the tagline on the original 18 certificate UK VHS release from Virgin Video in 1982. Warner/Reprise Video released the film on US home video in 1992. In 2005, the film was released on DVD by Shout Factory.

== Certifications ==
Region	Certification	Certified units/sales
Australia (ARIA)	Gold	7,500^{^}
^{^} Shipments figures based on certification alone.

== See also ==
- "Belsen Was a Gas"
- Great Reality TV Swindle
- The Great Rock 'n' Roll Swindle (album)
- Who Killed Bambi?
- The Filth and the Fury
