= Holidays in the Sun (song) =

Single by Sex Pistols

from the album Never Mind the Bollocks, Here's the Sex Pistols
- B-side: "Satellite"
- Released: 14 October 1977
- Recorded: 18 June 1977 at Wessex Sound Studios, London
- Genre: Punk rock
- Length: 3:20
- Label: Virgin
- Songwriters: John Beverley; Paul Cook; Steve Jones; John Lydon
- Producers: Chris Thomas; Bill Price

Sex Pistols singles chronology
"Pretty Vacant" (1977)	"Holidays in the Sun" (1977)	"No One Is Innocent" (1978)

Music video
- "Holidays in the Sun" on YouTube

"Holidays in the Sun" is a song by the English punk rock band the Sex Pistols. It was released on 14 October 1977 as the band's fourth single, as well as the advance single from their only album Never Mind the Bollocks, Here's the Sex Pistols. A #8 chart hit in the UK, the single proved to be the last with singer John Lydon for 30 years. Steve Jones and Paul Cook recorded one more single, "No One Is Innocent" with Ronnie Biggs, as the band imploded, and Sid Vicious recorded solo covers of "My Way" and "Somethin' Else" under the Pistols name. Rolling Stone ranked the song #43 of the 100 Greatest Guitar Songs of All Time.

== Song ==
The song was inspired by a trip to the Channel Island of Jersey: "We tried our holiday in the sun in the isle of Jersey and that didn't work. They threw us out." That trip was followed by a couple of weeks spent in Berlin. Although they described the city as "raining and depressing", they were relieved to get away from London. John Lydon said, "Being in London at the time made us feel like we were trapped in a prison camp environment. There was hatred and constant threat of violence. The best thing we could do was to go set up in a prison camp somewhere else. Berlin and its decadence was a good idea. The song came about from that. I loved Berlin. I loved the wall and the insanity of the place. The communists looked in on the circus atmosphere of West Berlin, which never went to sleep, and that would be their impression of the West."

"Holidays in the Sun" was later featured as the opening track on the group's debut album Never Mind the Bollocks, Here's the Sex Pistols. The single's B-side was "Satellite", a song about the band's early performances in "satellite towns" ("You know I don't like where you come from / It's just a satellite of London..."). The Sex Pistols had enjoyed playing away from London because it was an opportunity to play away from their manager Malcolm McLaren and his group of associates.

== Promotional posters ==
Two promotional posters were issued to promote the single. The most common of the pair was simply an oversized reproduction of the single's front cover.

The second version featured a monochrome image of a beach scene. This version of the poster was reproduced heavily for commercial sale during the mid-1980s.

== Charts ==
Chart (1977)	Peak position
UK Singles (OCC)	8
