= Somethin' Else (song) =

Single by Eddie Cochran
- B-side: "Boll Weevil Song"
- Released: July 1959
- Recorded: June 23, 1959
- Genre: Rock and roll, rockabilly
- Length: 2:08
- Label: Liberty
- Songwriters: Sharon Sheeley, Bob Cochran
- Producer: Eddie Cochran

Eddie Cochran singles chronology
"Teenage Heaven" (1959)	"Somethin' Else" (1959)	"Hallelujah! I Love Her So" (1959)

"Somethin' Else" is a song by the rockabilly musician Eddie Cochran, co-written by his girlfriend Sharon Sheeley and his elder brother Bob Cochran, and released in 1959. It has been covered by a wide range of artists, including Johnny Hallyday, the Sex Pistols, Led Zeppelin, and Tom Petty and the Heartbreakers.

== Original version ==
Bob Cochran, Eddie's brother, and Sharon Sheeley share the song writing credit along with Eddie. The first-person lyrics describe how the singer wants a convertible car he cannot afford, and a girl who he fears will not go out with him. But in the end, by saving money, he is able to buy an old Ford car, and works up the confidence to ask the girl out.

Musicians on the session were: Vocals/Guitar: Eddie Cochran, Drums: Gene Reggio, Electric Bass: Don Myers. The song peaked at No. 22 on the UK Singles Chart, and reached No. 58 on the Billboard Hot 100 in the U.S.

== Renditions ==
French singer Johnny Hallyday recorded a version titled "Elle est terrible". A live version, recorded at the Olympia Hall in Paris, was first released in 1962 and spent one week at the top position on the singles sales chart in France (from December 15 to 21). In Wallonia (French Belgium), it spent 28 weeks on the chart, peaking at No. 4.

The Sex Pistols recorded a version of "Something Else" for the album The Great Rock 'n' Roll Swindle (1979). The double A-sided single was credited to "Sex Pistols: vocals Sid Vicious" [sic] and was released three weeks after Vicious died. It peaked at No. 3 on the UK Singles Chart. The second side of the single was "Friggin' in the Riggin'", also credited to "Sex Pistols: vocals Steve Jones".

Led Zeppelin included a version of "Somethin' Else" on their 1997 compilation, BBC Sessions. However, in this live recording, Robert Plant sings the original song's second verse first and its fourth verse second, changing some of the lyrics along the way, and then adds a seemingly improvised third verse. There is no fourth verse in this rendition.

Tom Petty and the Heartbreakers included a version, recorded live during a March 1980 concert at London's Hammersmith Odeon, on their 2010 deluxe edition of Damn The Torpedoes.
