= Pretty Vacant =

1977 single by the Sex Pistols

Single by Sex Pistols

from the album Never Mind the Bollocks, Here's the Sex Pistols
- B-side: "No Fun"
- Released: 1 July 1977; 15 October 2007 (30th anniversary re-issue)
- Recorded: February 1977
- Studio: Wessex, London
- Genre: Punk rock
- Length: 3:18
- Label: Virgin (UK)
- Songwriters: Paul Cook; Steve Jones; John Lydon; Glen Matlock
- Producers: Chris Thomas; Bill Price Dave Goodman (demos)

Sex Pistols singles chronology
"God Save the Queen" (1977)	"Pretty Vacant" (1977)	"Holidays in the Sun" (1977)

Music video
- "Pretty Vacant" on YouTube

"Pretty Vacant" is a song by the English punk rock band the Sex Pistols. It was released on 1 July 1977 as the band's third single and was later featured on their only album, Never Mind the Bollocks, Here's the Sex Pistols, released during that same year.

Vocalist John Lydon's phrasing of the word "vacant", by emphasising its last syllable to sound like the vulgar word cunt, has given the song a controversial reputation.

== Composition ==
According to bassist Glen Matlock, the song's main riff was inspired by hearing "SOS" by ABBA. A reversed variant of this riff can be heard in "I'm So Bored With The U.S.A." by The Clash, recorded one month later but released three months earlier than the Sex Pistols record. The B-side of the single was a cover of the Stooges' "No Fun", which the band played on the spot without a proper rehearsal. It was taken from demo sessions recorded by producer Dave Goodman. In an interview for the June 2022 issue of Uncut, Matlock said that ”'Pretty Vacant', which is my song and my lyrics, I took inspiration from Richard Hell's 'Blank Generation'. But I kind of misunderstood what his song was all about. You gotta put the songs in the context of what was going on for a bloke like me in mid-70s London, with the three-day week and the IRA bombings and power cuts, against the fact I was a young man who met some interesting people who was trying to form a rock’n’roll band. 'Pretty Vacant' is a primal scream kind of thing: we don’t know what we’re gonna do, but we’re gonna do it anyway.”

The band made a video for "Pretty Vacant" (as well as one for "God Save the Queen") on 11 and 12 July 1977 at the studios of ITN in Wells Street, London. They were thrown out after throwing cans of lager at the cameramen on the 11th, but came back on the 12th to finish the recording.

== Charts ==
The song reached No. 6 on the UK Singles Chart and marked the band's first appearance on the British chart music TV programme Top of the Pops. The song gained attention for vocalist John Lydon's phrasing of the word "vacant", emphasising the last syllable to sound like the vulgar word cunt.

Chart (1977)	Peak position
Australia (Kent Music Report)	52
UK Singles (Official Charts)	6

== Certifications ==
Region	Certification	Certified units/sales
United Kingdom (BPI)	Silver	250,000^{^}
^{^} Shipments figures based on certification alone.

== Reception ==
NME magazine made it their Single of the Year in 1977.

In March 2005, Q magazine placed the song 26th in its list of the 100 Greatest Guitar Tracks. NME named it the 132nd-greatest song of all time in 2014. Billboard said that the lyrics are milder than some of the group's other songs, "the intense energy level never falters" but that the "bombastic guitar riffs" make the lyrics difficult to hear.

Cash Box said of the single edit that "Rotten's vocals are rhythmic, double-edged and snarling but also cleaned up for airplay" and that it "is a straight forward rocker with upfront drumming, slashing guitar licks and a brash attitude." Record World called it "great rock 'n' roll."

== Legacy ==
A live version of the track from Filthy Lucre Live was released as a single in 1996, and a 7-inch picture disc was released in 2012.

"Pretty Vacant" was rerecorded for the in-game soundtrack for the 2007 skateboarding videogame Skate, and was included in 2008 rhythm game Guitar Hero: World Tour.

== Covers and samples ==
"Pretty Vacant" was covered by Paul Jones in 1978. Joan Jett released a cover version on single, and Joey Ramone used the lead riff in his cover of "What a Wonderful World". This opening riff has been used as a punk trope on several songs of the genre, for instance in Eskorbuto's "Eskizofrenia" (1984).

The song was used in the 1981 film American Pop. An Irish-language version of the song, entitled "Folamh go Deas" (a literal translation), was also performed by Irish band Na Magairlí in 1981. In 1996 Black Grape released a cover version (very similar to the original) on their single "Fat Neck". South African pop group Shikisha also released a cover version of the song in 1996.

The group the Ukrainians perform a Ukrainian language version of the song on their EP Anarchy in the UK and album Respublika. The French band Les Négresses Vertes, as well as grime MC Lady Sovereign, have both covered "Pretty Vacant" and performed live versions of the song. Lady Sovereign's version is featured in the popular TV show, The O.C. and the cover version is featured on one of the six The O.C. soundtracks called Music from The O.C.: Mix 6 – Covering Our Tracks. Kathy Hampson's Free Elastic Band feature a slow acoustic folk-music style version in their live shows.

Producer Mike Thorne who was involved in the first recordings of the Sex Pistols made his own version of "Pretty Vacant" on his album Sprawl in 2005, with vocals by Lene Lovich.

The song is also the opening theme for the Canadian short-lived comedy sketch show The Vacant Lot.

== Books ==
- Matlock, Glen with Silverton, Pete (1990). I was a teenage Sex Pistol. Omnibus Press ISBN 0-7119-2491-0
- Lydon, John (1993). Rotten: No Irish, No Blacks, No Dogs. Hodder & Stoughton ISBN 978-0-85-965341-1
- Lydon, John (2014). Anger Is an Energy: My Life Uncensored. Simon & Schuster ISBN 978-1-47-113719-8
- Sex Pistols (2017). Never Mind the Bollocks, Here’s the Sex Pistols, 1977: The Bollocks Diaries. Octopus Publishing Group Ltd ISBN 978-1788400275
