= C'mon Everybody =

Single by Eddie Cochran
- B-side: "Don't Ever Let Me Go"
- Released: October 1958
- Recorded: October 10, 1958
- Genre: Rock and roll
- Length: 1:53
- Label: Liberty 55166 (US); London HLU 8792 (UK)
- Songwriters: Eddie Cochran; Jerry Capehart
- Producer: Eddie Cochran

"C'mon Everybody" is a 1958 song by Eddie Cochran and Jerry Capehart, originally released as a B-side. The single reached #6 on the UK singles chart and #35 on the Billboard chart in the U.S.

== Background ==
When Cochran recorded his lead vocal for the song, he also created an alternate version of the song called "Let's Get Together". The only change to the lyrics was exactly that: the phrase "Let's get together" in place of "C'mon everybody". This alternate version was eventually released on a compilation album in the 1960s.

== Personnel ==
- Eddie Cochran – vocal, guitar and drum overdub
- Connie 'Guybo' Smith – electric bass
- Earl Palmer – drums
- Ray Johnson – piano
- Jerry Capehart – tambourine

== Chart performance ==
In 1959 it peaked in the UK (where Cochran had major success and where he died in 1960) at number six in the singles chart, and, thirty years later, in 1988, the track was re-issued there and became a number 14 hit. In the United States the song got to number 35 on the Billboard Hot 100.

Chart (1958/59)	Peak position
Canadian Singles Chart	39
Flanders Singles Chart	20
UK Singles Chart	6
US Billboard Hot 100	35

Chart (1988)	Peak position
Irish Singles Chart	7
UK Singles Chart	14

== Legacy ==
The song is one of the Rock and Roll Hall of Fame 500. "C'mon Everybody" is ranked number 403 on the Rolling Stone magazine's list of The 500 Greatest Songs of All Time. It was also used by Levi Strauss & Co. to promote their 501 jeans line in 1988. The song was re-released as a promotional single that year. The Hershey Company used Cochran's version in a 2021 promotional advertisement for Hershey's chocolate.

== Cover versions ==
Sex Pistols (with Sid Vicious, not Johnny Rotten on lead vocals) covered the song for their soundtrack The Great Rock 'n' Roll Swindle in 1979. This was also released as a single, peaking at number three in the UK Singles Chart.

English rock band Humble Pie covered the song for their 1972 album Smokin', which had a heavier distorted tone and featured original guitar licks and a guitar solo incorporated by the band. Led Zeppelin regularly played the song live, though did not record it on any album.

English rock band UFO covered the song for their 1970 debut album UFO 1.

The song was also recorded by Adam Faith in 1959, NRBQ in 1969, Alvin Stardust, The Wild Angels, Bryan Adams, P.J. Proby, Ricky Horton, Peter Kraus, Hal Munro, Billy Fury, and Cliff Richard and The Shadows. The Knack performed the song live in 1979.
