= Dave Goodman (music producer) =

- Born: 29 March 1951
- Died: 10 February 2005 (aged 53) Malta
- Occupations: record producer, musician

Dave Goodman (29 March 1951 – 10 February 2005) was a record producer and musician, perhaps best known as the live sound engineer for Sex Pistols, and the producer of three of their studio demo sessions.

== Sex Pistols ==
A few Sex Pistols fans prefer the raw "live" sound captured by Goodman to the official versions of the songs released as single A-sides and on the album Never Mind the Bollocks, Here's the Sex Pistols. Goodman also maintained that many of his own production innovations and arrangement ideas in relation to the Sex Pistols songs were lifted and reused in the creation of the official releases. But many dislike the amateur sound in comparison to the overtly more professional official recordings the band chose to release.

=== Recording sessions ===
The first Goodman/Sex Pistols session was recorded between 13 and 30 July 1976 at the group's Denmark Street rehearsal room (with post-production at Riverside and Decibel Studios), when they were without a record contract. These demos helped secure the deal with EMI and furnished the eventual B-side track, "I Wanna Be Me".

The second session, held 10–12 October 1976 at Lansdowne Studios (reconvening at Wessex Studios), was an abortive attempt to record the "Anarchy in the U.K." single. The group had signed with EMI the previous week, and it later transpired that the sessions had originally been booked by Polydor, whom manager Malcolm McLaren had been playing off against EMI, and who had assumed they would imminently sign the group. Although the recording of the single was abandoned (the single was eventually produced by Chris Thomas), the session did produce several cover versions later used as B-sides and on the soundtrack album The Great Rock 'n' Roll Swindle, which Goodman helped engineer and produce.

The final sessions with Goodman, between 17 and 28 January 1977 at Gooseberry Studios (post-production at Eden Studios), took place while the group was in a hiatus and negotiating a settlement from EMI following their sacking. These were the last recordings made by the original group line-up, and they helped them win their subsequent record deals with A&M and Virgin. The sessions also featured the first studio recording of "New York" and the Sex Pistols' valedictory song to their former record company, "EMI".

=== Reuse ===
Many of Goodman's Sex Pistols demos were unofficially distributed on the bootleg album Spunk in 1977, and the demos have formed the basis for countless other subsequent official, semi-official and bootleg records since, including many releases initiated or licensed by Goodman himself. In 2002, he had been planning a new release of raw pre-Spunk demo mixes, entitled X-Spunk.

== Later work ==
In August 1978, he released a single "Justifiable Homicide" under the name Dave Goodman and Friends which featured Paul Cook and Steve Jones of the Sex Pistols, but they could not be named for contractual reasons. Although there were a limited number of singles pressed with their names and these became quite rare and valuable.

In 1979, recording at Rockfield Studios, he co-produced and engineered with Paget King the roots reggae sound system dub music discomix Finsbury Park b/w The Tribe by the London reggae band, Tribesman. Rico Rodriguez and Dick Cuthell were the horns section on the Tribesman release, which was well received amongst the serious roots listeners of the day. In 1986, he opted to hire engineer Marty Munsch, who was with CPI and Twain studios in the New York City area in the United States for Mastering and compilation of finalized work on STP Records, for the release of The Sex Pistols "Pirates of Destiny" as an RIA officially documented American release.

In 2000 he appeared in the cult underground film Remember a Day, as The Mime Troupe Leader, he also provided the incidental music soundtrack with Darryl Read who starred in the film as Roger Bannerman.

Goodman produced several other early punk rock acts, including Eater, Chelsea, garage punks The Cannibals, Maniacs, UK Subs and in 2002 with Darryl Read. He subsequently produced and performed with very many other artists, and eventually ran his own studio and record label in Malta, Mandala Music.

Goodman was later involved in producing a series of 'soundalike Pistols' tracks using the name "Ex Pistols", much to the confusion of Sex Pistols fans, some of which believed the songs to be the real deal. The tracks were recorded using numerous session musicians, even including Glen Matlock.

Goodman was also a major influence and collaborator on the Sex Drugs and HIV project. Recorded at Goodmans Mandala Studios, a double album of 40 songs by Mat Sargent of Sham 69 / Chelsea to help raise money and awareness for the Terrence Higgins Trust, Rape Crisis, Release & Cancer Research. The songs have many different styles and feature different artists on each instrument. Over 200 musicians contributed to the album including; Tony Hadley of Spandau Ballet, Pauline Black of the Selecter, Nicko McBrain of Iron Maiden, Angie Bowie, Adam Ant, Africa Bambaataa, Mike Spenser of The Cannibals to name a few. Goodman played on one of the tracks as well as co-producing most of the songs for the project.

Dave Goodman died of a heart attack, at the age of 53, at his home in Malta.
