= God Save the Queen (Sex Pistols song) =

1977 single by Sex Pistols

Single by Sex Pistols

from the album Never Mind the Bollocks, Here's the Sex Pistols
- B-side: "No Feeling" A&M Records; "Did You No Wrong" Virgin Records
- Released: 27 May 1977
- Recorded: October 1976; March 1977
- Studio: Wessex, London
- Genre: Punk rock
- Length: 3:20
- Label: Virgin; A&M
- Songwriters: Paul Cook; Steve Jones; Glen Matlock; Johnny Rotten
- Producers: Chris Thomas; Bill Price

Sex Pistols singles chronology
"Anarchy in the U.K." (1976)	"God Save the Queen" (1977)	"Pretty Vacant" (1977)

Music video
- "God Save the Queen" on YouTube

"God Save the Queen" is a song by English punk rock band Sex Pistols. It was released as the band's second single after Anarchy in the U.K. and was later included on their only studio album, Never Mind the Bollocks, Here's the Sex Pistols. The song was released during Queen Elizabeth II's Silver Jubilee in 1977.

The record's lyrics, as well as the cover, were controversial at the time; both the British Broadcasting Corporation (BBC) and the Independent Broadcasting Authority refused to play the song, including a total ban of its airing by the BBC. The original title for the song was "No Future", with the lyrics themselves being a general expression of the band's view of the monarchy or any individual or establishment commanding general obligation.

The song reached No. 1 on the NME charts in the United Kingdom, and made it to No. 2 on the official UK Singles Chart as used by the BBC. This led to accusations by some that the charts had been "fixed" to prevent the song from reaching No. 1.

== Music ==
God Save the Queen was described by Cashbox as a sparsely produced, guitar dominated song that helped to define punk rock.

== Background ==
The song's title is taken directly from the British national anthem. At the time, the song was highly controversial for its equation of Queen Elizabeth with a "fascist regime" and for the lyric "there is no future in England's dreaming". According to Glen Matlock, who had co-written the song – although he was no longer a member of the band by the time it was released – the bass was inspired by the Move's "Fire Brigade". Guitarist Steve Jones stated that when Matlock first played him the song, it did not sound like 'God Save the Queen': "It was like 'Love Me Do' or something".

Although many believe it was created because of the Silver Jubilee, the band has denied it, with Paul Cook saying that "it wasn't written specifically for the Queen's Jubilee. We weren't aware of it at the time. It wasn't a contrived effort to go out and shock everyone." John Lydon has explained the lyrics as follows: "You don't write 'God Save the Queen' because you hate the English race. You write a song like that because you love them, and you're fed up with them being mistreated." He intended to evoke sympathy for the English working class and a general resentment towards the monarchy.

On 7 June 1977, the Jubilee holiday, the band attempted to play the song from a boat named the Queen Elizabeth on the River Thames, near the Palace of Westminster. After a scuffle involving attendee Jah Wobble and a camera man, 11 people, including Malcolm McLaren, the man who organized the concert, and several other members of the band's entourage, were arrested when the boat docked.

== Release and reception ==
The single was released on 27 May 1977, and was regarded by many of the general public as an assault on Queen Elizabeth and the monarchy. During the media furore over the single, Lydon and producers Bill Price and Chris Thomas were subject to a razor attack outside a pub in Highbury, London.

Agreeing with the apparent anti-Windsor message, American postmodern author William S. Burroughs sent a congratulatory letter to the Sex Pistols following the release of the song.

Before the group signed to Virgin, a small number of copies of "God Save the Queen" had been pressed on the A&M label. These are now among the most valuable records ever pressed in the UK, with a resale value as of 2006 of between £500 and £13,000 a copy, depending on condition of the disc. The B-side of the A&M single was "No Feeling", an early rough mix or performance of "No Feelings". (A later version was released on the Pistols' debut album.) Record Collector named the A&M single the most collectable record of all time. On 5 July 2024, a new record sale price of £24,320 (over $31,000) was set at specialist vinyl auction house Wessex Auction Rooms in the UK by auctioneer Martin Hughes.

=== Censorship and chart controversy ===
Upon its release, the song was banned from both the BBC and radio stations regulated by the Independent Broadcasting Authority with Radio 2 controller Charles McLelland saying the song was "in gross bad taste". Additionally, the major retailers Boots, WHSmith, and Woolworths all declined to sell the record. Nevertheless, it peaked at No. 2 (below Rod Stewart's "I Don't Want to Talk About It" released as a double A-side budget single along with "The First Cut Is the Deepest") on the official UK Singles Chart used by the BBC; it did so during the week of the Silver Jubilee's official observation. On the singles chart displayed in branches of WH Smith, the single's position at No. 2 was represented by a blank line.

However, various sources state that it was indeed the highest-selling single of the week, and it has been suggested that the song was deliberately blocked from reaching the top spot on the "official" BMRB chart. According to a 1998 article in The Independent, for one week compilers "decreed that shops which sold their own records could not have those records represented in the chart", and thus sales from Virgin Megastores were not counted. Virgin had few doubts that theirs was the higher-selling single; the company's sales total out of stock exceeded the officially cited sales for the Rod Stewart single. The NME magazine chart did in fact place the single at number-one during the Silver Jubilee of Elizabeth II. In 2001, the BBC described the song as having "reached number one in the UK".

== Legacy ==
"God Save the Queen" was included on Never Mind the Bollocks, Here's the Sex Pistols, the band's only album, and several subsequent compilation albums.

Rolling Stone ranked "God Save the Queen" number 175 on its list of the 500 Greatest Songs of All Time and it is also one of the Rock and Roll Hall of Fame's 500 Songs that Shaped Rock and Roll. It was Sounds magazine's Single of the Year in 1977. In 1989, it was eighteenth in the list of NME writers' all-time top 150 singles. Q magazine in 2002 ranked it first on its list of "The 50 Most Exciting Tunes Ever..." and third on its list of "100 Songs That Changed the World" in 2003. In 2007, NME launched a campaign to get the song to number 1 in the British charts and encouraged readers to purchase or download the single on 8 October. However, it only made number 42. In 2010, the New Statesman listed it as one of the "Top 20 Political Songs".

In 2010, the song was ranked among the top 10 most controversial songs of all time in a poll conducted by PRS for Music.

In 2002, the song was re-released to coincide with the Queen's Golden Jubilee, whereupon the single charted in the top 20. In 2012, it was announced that the single would be re-released on 28 May 2012, coinciding with the 35th anniversary of the original release and the Queen's Diamond Jubilee. Lydon has voiced his disapproval over the re-release and the campaign, saying in a statement: "I would like to very strongly distance myself from the recent stories and campaign to push 'God Save the Queen' for the number one spot... this campaign totally undermines what The Sex Pistols stood for." The 2012 re-release peaked at no. 80 in the singles chart. Rights holder UMC re-released the record for the Queen's Platinum Jubilee in 2022, with 1,977 vinyl copies having the same tracks as the original A&M version and the rest labelled as a Virgin release. The record sold 5,712 vinyl copies and became the number one single on the Official Physical Singles Chart Top 100 of 10 June 2022 to 16 June 2022, with a chart placing of number 57 in the main chart when the 279 downloads were added.

In recent years, Lydon has moderated his views on the royal family. In 2001, he stated: "Is the Queen a moron? I probably think so. That woman has precious little to do with her so-called subjects, other than ignore the hell out of us.... We're just there to prop up her tiara." The following year, he denied he was an anti-monarchist in an interview on Richard & Judy: "I was never pro them or anti them. I just think if we're going to have a monarchy it may as well work properly. I mean, we pay for it, after all". Despite his previous 2001 comments about the Queen, Lydon stated on Piers Morgan Live in 2015: "I never said I didn't [love the Queen], I just don't like the institution". In another interview with Piers Morgan on Piers Morgan Uncensored in 2022, the year of Platinum Jubilee, Lydon further expressed his respect for the Queen: "I'm [not] completely dead against The Royal Family as human beings. I'm actually really really proud of the Queen for surviving and doing so well. I applaud her for that. That is a fantastic achievement. I'm not a curmudgeon about that. I just think that if I'm paying my tax money to support this system, I should have a say so on how it's spent". Lydon stated in a June 2022 opinion piece published during the Queen's Platinum Jubilee that he had softened his views on royalty and did not harbor any resentment against the royal family. He signed it off with "God save the Queen". Guitarist Steve Jones and bassist Glen Matlock also expressed their views on the monarchy in 2022. Jones stated: "I’ve never had any connection to the monarchy, to be honest. It meant nothing to me, still doesn't. So to me ['God Save the Queen'] was just a laugh, it was a giggle". While Matlock stated in an interview with Good Morning Britain: "I've nothing personal against the queen, lots of people love and respect her, but I do think she's a bit of a sop to what's going on".

With the death of Elizabeth II in September 2022 and the accession of King Charles III, Matlock began to perform a modified version of the song which reflects the royal succession. Lydon paid tribute to the Queen on Twitter and subsequently objected to any commercial use of The Sex Pistols' tracks to capitalize on the Queen's death.

=== Use in other media ===
The song could be heard during Journey Along the Thames, a two-minute film directed by Danny Boyle and played at the beginning of the 2012 Summer Olympics opening ceremony, an event opened only by the Queen Elizabeth II, and held during her Diamond Jubilee. A camera traverses the route the band took in the boat the Queen Elizabeth, between Tower Bridge and Westminster, as the song plays.

On 3 November 2016, Andrew Rosindell, a Conservative MP, argued in an early day motion for a return to the broadcasting of the national anthem at the end of BBC One transmissions each day (the practice had been dropped in 1997, due to BBC One adopting 24-hour broadcasting by simulcasting BBC News 24 overnight, rendering closedown obsolete), to commemorate the Brexit vote and Britain's subsequent withdrawing from the European Union. At the evening of the same day, BBC Two's Newsnight programme ended its nightly broadcast with host of that night Kirsty Wark saying that they were "incredibly happy to oblige" Rosindell's request, and then played a clip of the Sex Pistols' similarly named song, much to Rosindell's discontent.

== Charts ==
Chart (1977–2007)	Peak position
New Zealand (Recorded Music NZ)	38
Norway (VG-lista)	3
Spain (AFE)	14
Sweden (Sverigetopplistan)	2
United Kingdom (OCC)	2
United Kingdom (NME)	1

== Certifications ==
Region	Certification	Certified units/sales
United Kingdom (BPI)	Silver	250,000^{^}
^{^} Shipments figures based on certification alone.

== Cover artwork ==
The single's picture sleeve, featuring a defaced image of Queen Elizabeth II, was designed by Jamie Reid and in 2001 was ranked No. 1 in a list of the 100 greatest record covers of all time by Q magazine. A photograph of the image is held by the National Portrait Gallery, London.

== Cover versions ==
=== Motörhead version ===
"God Save the Queen"

Single by Motörhead

from the album We Are Motörhead
- B-side: "One More Fucking Time/God Save the Queen (Enhanced Video)"
- Released: 2000
- Recorded: June–August 1999
- Studio: Karo Studios, Brackel, Germany
- Length: 3:19
- Label: Steamhammer
- Songwriters: John Lydon; Steve Jones; Glen Matlock; Paul Cook
- Producers: Motörhead; Bob Kulick; Bruce Bouillet; Duane Barron

Motörhead singles chronology
"Born to Raise Hell" (1994)	"God Save the Queen" (2000)	"We Are Motörhead" (2000)

Music video
- God Save the Queen on YouTube

A cover version by the English heavy metal band Motörhead was released as a single in 2000 to promote their album, We Are Motörhead. It also appears on their covers album Under Cöver (2017).

The cover art gives further reference to the Sex Pistols by using the same cut-out words to form the title as the Sex Pistols' single cover.

A performance of the song recorded during the band's twenty-fifth anniversary concert at Brixton Academy, on 22 October 2000, appears on their 25 & Alive Boneshaker DVD.

==== Single track listing ====
1. "God Save the Queen" (Paul Cook, Steve Jones, John Lydon, Glen Matlock)
2. "One More Fucking Time" (Lemmy, Phil Campbell, Mikkey Dee)
3. God Save the Queen (Enhanced Video)" (Cook, Jones, Lydon, Matlock)

==== Personnel ====
- Phil "Wizzö" Campbell – guitar, vocals
- Mikkey Dee – drums
- Lemmy – bass, lead vocals

=== The SCTV satire ===
On the 18 March 1983 episode of SCTV in the Mel's Rock Pile segment, Mel Slirrup (Eugene Levy) has a tribute to punk rock featuring a number by the band the Queenhaters—Martin Short (lead singer), Andrea Martin (lead guitarist/back-up vocals), Eugene Levy (rhythm guitarist), Joe Flaherty (bass), and John Candy (drummer)—performing "I Hate the Bloody Queen", a sound-alike song that almost matches the original it is spoofing, with references to the Falklands War ("I'd like to drown the Queen/Off the coast of Argentine/Throw her off a battleship/With her Falkland war machine!") and the problems that Diana, Princess of Wales was, and would be soon, having with her in-laws ("I feel sorry for you, Lady Di/Having a mother-in-law like that!"). This spoof of the Sex Pistols "God Save the Queen" even has its own cover version by Mudhoney on the tribute album Oh Canaduh! 2.

=== Billy Idol & Generation Sex ===
Billy Idol performed this song with Generation Sex at Glastonbury 2023 Generation Sex - God Save the Queen (Glastonbury 2023) on YouTube.

== See also ==
- Abolition of monarchy
- Criticism of monarchy
- Punk ideologies
- Punk subculture
