= Raw and Live =

Live album by Sex Pistols
- Released: 2004
- Genre: Punk rock

Professional ratings
Review scores
Source	Rating
Christgau's Consumer Guide	(2-star Honorable Mention)

Raw and Live is a two disc live album ostensibly by the English punk rock band Sex Pistols that was released in 2004. However, Disc 2 is a Vicious White Kids concert, the band featuring Sid Vicious, Glen Matlock, Steve New, and Rat Scabies.

== Track listing ==
Disc 1

1. "Pretty Vacant"
2. "No Feelings"
3. "I Wanna Be Me"
4. "I'm a Lazy Sod"
5. "Submission"
6. "C'mon Everybody"
7. "Search and Destroy"
8. "Anarchy in the U.K."
9. "Satellite"
10. "No Lip"
11. "Bill Grundy Interview" (Dialogue)

Disc 2 – live at the Electric Ballroom, London, 1978

1. "Somethin' Else"
2. "C'mon Everybody"
3. "Stepping Stone"
4. "No Lip"
5. "I Wanna Be Your Dog"
6. "Belsen Was a Gas"
7. "Chatterbox"
8. "Tight Pants"
9. "My Way"
10. "Search and Destroy"
11. "My Way"
