= Spungen =

Spungen is a surname. Notable people with the surname include:

- Deborah Spungen (born 1937-2024), American author
- Nancy Spungen (1958–1978), American murder victim
- Susan Spungen, American food writer, editor, and food stylist
