= The Paddy Lincoln Gang =

2012 film directed by Ben Jagger

- Directed by: Ben Jagger
- Written by: Alistair Audsley
- Produced by: Alistair Audsley; David Bainbridge; Ben Jagger; Graham Kentsley; James Rayner
- Starring: Dean S. Jagger; Joseph DiMasso; Richard Wagner; Demetri Watkins; Stephen Bridgewater; Amy Lawhorn; Glen Matlock
- Cinematography: Ryan Ovadia
- Edited by: Alex Fenn
- Music by: Julien Diaz; Tim Palmer
- Production companies: Belief Films; Solus Entertainment; Stealth Media Group
- Release dates: 29 September 2012 (SoCal Film Festival); 3 May 2014 (United Kingdom)
- Running time: 90 minutes
- Country: United Kingdom
- Language: English

The Paddy Lincoln Gang is a 2012 drama thriller film written and produced by Alistair Audsley, and directed by Ben Jagger. The film stars Dean S. Jagger, Joseph DiMasso, Stephen Bridgewater, Amy Lawhorn and Glen Matlock. Principal photography began on 2 November 2011. The film premiered in competition at the 2012 SoCal Film Festival.

== Plot ==
The Paddy Lincoln Gang are an emerging rock band on the verge of huge success. But their complex and troubled Irish lead singer is haunted by his own paranoia and suspicions that something is not right with the band, his manager or his girlfriend.

== Cast ==
- Dean S. Jagger as Rob McAlister
- Joseph DiMasso as 'Steady' Eddie
- Richard Wagner as Rick
- Demetri Watkins as Tom Dufresne
- Stephen Bridgewater as Dan Craine
- Amy Lawhorn as Leyla Dufresne
- Glen Matlock as himself

== Production ==
=== Development ===
It was adapted from a short film entitled A Night at Robert McAlister’s. In 2009, the film premiered on Hollywood Boulevard for an audience of music and film industry personnel, including cast members of American television series Heroes. The short went on to win several awards at the Hoboken International Film Festival, as well as featuring at the 2011 Cannes Film Festival.

In November 2011, Screen Daily announced The Paddy Lincoln Gang alongside Anne Fontaine's Adore as upcoming 'hot projects'. While Variety were the first major outlet to reveal Sex Pistols founding-member Glen Matlock's involvement in the project.

=== Filming ===
The film was shot in various locations including Leeds and London, United Kingdom. Incorporating the original short film with new footage, the feature length draws non-sequential editing inspiration from Steven Soderbergh's crime film The Limey.

A docudrama scene was filmed backstage at a live festival performance from The Faces. Improvised between Sex Pistols bassist Glen Matlock and lead actor Dean S. Jagger.

== Music ==
Musicians Matthew Steer and Colin 'Lizzard' McGuinness were brought into the project to shape the sound of the fictional Paddy Lincoln Gang band. Hot Press featured 'Give Anger a Name' and covered U2 and Pearl Jam producer Tim Palmer's involvement in the soundtrack.

== Release ==
The film held its US premiere at the SoCal Film Festival in Huntington Beach, California on 29 September 2012. Executive producer Graham Kentsley played an ambassadorial role for the Russian premiere in Volgograd on 28 October 2013, gaining a further selection for The Paddy Lincoln Gang at the 2014 Artsloy Festival, where he served on the expert board. On 3 May 2014, the film held its European debut at the UK premiere in St Albans, Hertfordshire. Kentsley fulfilled both panel and media duties with the festival and Herts Advertiser respectively, promoting the film.

== Reception ==
The Paddy Lincoln Gang received positive reviews from its debut at the 2012 SoCal Film Festival, winning multiple awards including the 'Best in Fest' prize. It received an Oregon International Film Festival 'Platinum Award' that year.
