= Ghosts of Princes in Towers =

Studio album by Rich Kids
- Released: August 1978
- Recorded: 1978
- Genre: Punk rock; power pop; post-punk
- Length: 47:48
- Label: EMI
- Producer: Mick Ronson

Singles from Ghosts of Princes in Towers
- 1. "Rich Kids" Released: 13 Jan 1978; 2. "Marching Men" Released: 19 May 1978; 3. "Ghosts of Princes in Towers" Released: 25 Aug 1978

Ghosts of Princes in Towers is the only studio album by British band Rich Kids, released in August 1978 by record label EMI. It was produced by Mick Ronson.

== Release and reception ==
Ghosts of Princes in Towers was released in August 1978. The album featured their hit single "Rich Kids", which reached number 24 in the UK Singles Chart. Two other singles, "Marching Men" and "Ghosts of Princes in Towers", were released. The album itself reached number 51 in the UK Albums Chart.

== Reception ==
Professional ratings
Review scores
Source	Rating
AllMusic	3/5 stars
Head Heritage	favourable
Trouser Press	favourable

A point of criticism for the album was its production. In its retrospective review, AllMusic wrote that the album "failed to live up to the promise of the single ["Ghosts of Princes in Towers"], in most cases trading punky power-pop in favor of more dirge-like hard rock – muddy sound doesn't help matters either." Trouser Press wrote that "despite abysmal sound, the band's talent emerges, and Ghosts is an extraordinary album of daring experimental rock/pop". Head Heritage described it as "an outstanding album that is head and shoulders above anything The Jam or Buzzcocks had yet released at the time."

== Track listing ==
Side A
No.	Title	Writer(s)	Length
1.	"Strange One"	Glen Matlock, Steve New	4:24
2.	"Hung on You"	Matlock	2:55
3.	"Ghosts of Princes in Towers"	Matlock, New	3:23
4.	"Cheap Emotions"	Matlock, New	4:03
5.	"Marching Men"	Midge Ure	3:50

Side B
No.	Title	Writer(s)	Length
6.	"Put You in the Picture" (Originally recorded by PVC2)	Ure, Billy McIsaac	2:44
7.	"Young Girls"	Ure	2:48
8.	"Bullet-Proof Lover"	Matlock, Alex McDowell	3:09
9.	"Rich Kids"	Matlock	2:55
10.	"Lovers and Fools"	Ure	2:34
11.	"Burning Sounds"	Matlock, New	3:38

Bonus tracks on CD reissue
No.	Title	Writer(s)	Length
12.	"Empty Words" (B-side to "Rich Kids")	Matlock, New	3:00
13.	"Here Comes the Nice (live)" (Small Faces cover, B-side to "Marching Men")	Steve Marriott, Ronnie Lane	3:01
14.	"Only Arsenic" (B-side to "Ghosts of Princes in Towers")	Matlock	4:49

== Personnel ==
Rich Kids

- Midge Ure – lead (1–3, 5–10, 13, 14) and backing vocals, rhythm guitar, keyboards (2, 10)
- Steve New – lead guitar, keyboards (1), backing vocals
- Glen Matlock – bass, backing and lead (4, 11, 12) vocals
- Rusty Egan – drums

with:

- Mick Ronson – keyboards (1, 3, 6, 10)
- Ian McLagan – piano on "Cheap Emotions"

Technical

- Rocking Russian – cover design
- Peter Lavery – cover photography
