= Vicious White Kids =

English punk rock band (1978)

- L-R: Matlock, Scabies, New, Vicious

Background information
- Origin: London, England
- Genres: Punk rock
- Years active: 1978
- Past members: Sid Vicious; Glen Matlock; Steve New; Rat Scabies; Nancy Spungen

Vicious White Kids were an English punk rock band from London that formed for only one concert on 15 August 1978, staged at the Electric Ballroom in London. The former bassist of Sex Pistols, Sid Vicious, was the lead singer. It was his final concert in England, as he died of a heroin overdose the following February.

Recordings of the concert, which included covers of Frank Sinatra's "My Way" and the Stooges' "I Wanna Be Your Dog", have been released multiple times: in 1991 on DeLorean Records, in 1993 on Receiver Records, in 2002 on Castle Records, and in 2007 on Sanctuary Records. The 2007 release includes an interview with Matlock and Scabies.

== Formation ==
Vicious was due to fly to New York City and needed money, so after bumping into ex-Pistol Glen Matlock one day, he decided to play a gig with him. Matlock, who Vicious had replaced in the Sex Pistols, saw it as an opportunity "to show there was no animosity" between them, he later commented. Matlock recruited his Rich Kids bandmate Stella Nova on guitar, and the Damned's Rat Scabies completed the line up on drums. Vicious' girlfriend Nancy Spungen sang backing vocals, but after hearing her at rehearsals, Matlock made sure her microphone was not plugged in on the night of the gig. The name of the band came from an amalgamation of Sid Vicious, the Rich Kids and Rat Scabies' part-time outfit the White Cats.

== Music Style ==
The Vicious White Kids are described as heavy punk rock, much like Matlock and Vicious' former band, the Sex Pistols.

== Vicious White Kids; Live at the Electric Ballroom ==
The band performed in the Camden Electric Ballroom, a two-storey concert venue in Camden Town, London, England.

The Vicious White Kids performed several cover songs by musicians and bands such as the Stooges, Ramones, Frank Sinatra, and the New York Dolls. They also performed the controversial Sex Pistols song "Belsen Was a Gas".

Other songs performed by the band during their concert included "Chatterbox" by the New York Dolls, "Tight Pants" by Iggy and the Stooges, Frank Sinatra's “My Way”, Eddie Cochran's “C'mon Everybody” and “Somethin' Else”, and Dave Berry's "Don't Give Me No Lip". The Vicious White Kids also performed “I Wanna Be Your Dog” by the Stooges and “(I'm Not Your) Steppin' Stone” by the Monkees.

== Disbandment ==
The Camden Electric Ballroom concert would be the one and only complete concert that the Vicious White Kids would perform as a band. Following the concert, the band became almost completely inactive in the music world. They would permanently disband when Spungen was stabbed to death in a hotel room in October 1978, and Vicious was arrested for her murder. Vicious died of a heroin overdose in February 1979.

After the Vicious White Kids broke up, Matlock, Scabies and New all moved on with their careers. Matlock has performed with a number of other artists, including Iggy Pop and the London Cowboys. Scabies has played in various bands as a drummer over the years. New was minimally active in the music business after the band broke up, and died of cancer in 2010.

The band's one concert has been released and re-released many times. It was released in 1991 by DeLorean Records, by Castle Records in 2002, and Sanctuary Records in 2007. The band's one concert has been fully released onto YouTube, as well, with a 31-minute concert video of the band's performance.

== Members ==
- Sid Vicious – lead vocals
- Glen Matlock – bass guitar
- Steve New – guitar
- Rat Scabies – drums
- Nancy Spungen – backing vocals (inaudible)

== Selected discography ==
Their only concert has been released many times.

=== The Vicious White Kids featuring Sid Vicious, 1991 ===
==== Track listing ====
1. "C'mon Everybody" [originally by Eddie Cochran]
2. "(I'm Not Your) Steppin' Stone" [originally by The Monkees]
3. "Don't Gimme No Lip" [originally by Dave Berry]
4. "I Wanna Be Your Dog" [originally by Iggy and the Stooges]
5. "Belsen Was a Gas" [originally by Sex Pistols]
6. "Chatterbox" [originally by New York Dolls]
7. "Tight Pants (Shake Appeal)" [originally by Iggy and the Stooges]
8. "Something Else" [originally by Eddie Cochran]
9. "My Way" [originally by Frank Sinatra]
10. [extra track on album reissues] Interview with Glen Matlock and Rat Scabies
