= Live at Winterland 1978 =

Live album by Sex Pistols
- Released: 2001
- Recorded: 14 January 1978

Live at Winterland 1978 is a live album by Sex Pistols, first released in its entirety in 2001. The last two songs were released by Warner Bros. Records on their two-disc 1980 Loss-Leader sampler, Troublemakers, bookending the compilation. The version of the song "Belsen Was a Gas" was previously released in 1979 on The Great Rock 'n' Roll Swindle (album).

This is the Sex Pistols' last concert (before reunion in 1996), recorded in San Francisco at the Winterland Ballroom. With the exception of the official VHS and DVD mono releases and "Never Mind Winterland" unofficial mono CD, all the other audio stereo formats are slightly incomplete (30 seconds are edited in "Bodies").

The Avengers, one of the bands that opened for the Sex Pistols at this show, also released their set from the night on an album of the same name.

== Track listing ==
1. "God Save the Queen" - 3:27
2. "I Wanna Be Me" - 3:20
3. "Seventeen" - 2:08
4. "New York" - 3:30
5. "E.M.I." - 3:19
6. "Belsen Was a Gas" - 2:10
7. "Bodies" - 3:28
8. "Holidays in the Sun" - 4:07
9. "Liar" - 3:00
10. "No Feelings" - 3:02
11. "Problems" - 4:14
12. "Pretty Vacant" - 3:25
13. "Anarchy In The USA" - 3:15
14. "No Fun" - 6:43

== Personnel ==
- Johnny Rotten - vocals
- Steve Jones - guitar, backing vocals
- Sid Vicious - bass, backing vocals
- Paul Cook - drums
