= Revolver (TV series) =

- Created by: Mickie Most
- Presented by: Peter Cook
- Country of origin: United Kingdom
- Original language: English

Production
- Producer: Mickie Most
- Running time: 45 minutes (incl. commercials)
- Production company: ATV

Original release
- Network: ITV
- Release: 20 May – 2 September 1978

Revolver is a British music television series on ITV that ran for one series of eight episodes in 1978.

It was produced by ATV, and the series creator and producer was Mickie Most. The show featured live music performances most closely related to the then emergent punk rock and new wave music scenes – though it also included artists who were not from those genres, such as Dire Straits, Lindisfarne and Kate Bush.

Peter Cook played the manager of the fictional ballroom where the show was supposedly taking place, and frequently made disparaging remarks about the acts appearing. Chris Hill played the "king of the kids", a loudmouthed character whose role was to stir up the live audience. Birmingham DJ Les Ross ran a hamburger stand while sharing rock trivia and hosting the Revolver Reviver spot.

Artists featured that subsequently became more famous were: Ian Dury & The Blockheads, The Jam, Elvis Costello and David Coverdale/Whitesnake.

Other notable artists included Alberto Y Lost Trios Paranoias, XTC, Tom Robinson Band, Nick Lowe, Steel Pulse, The Vibrators, The Stranglers, Buzzcocks, Siouxsie and the Banshees, The Rezillos, Bonnie Tyler, The Fabulous Poodles, The Boomtown Rats, The Motors, Suzi Quatro, X-Ray Spex, The Tourists, stunt performer Eddie Kidd performing "Leave it to the Kidd", The Rich Kids, and The Only Ones.

Revolver was originally slated as a prime time show, but due to the controversial nature of punk at the time, it was scheduled in a graveyard slot by some ITV regions. It consequently received poor ratings and did not return for a second series.

== List of episodes ==
Show	Air date	Guests
1x01	20 May 1978	XTC, Steel Pulse, John Dowie, Rich Kids, Kate Bush, Ricky Cool and the Icebergs, Tom Robinson Band
1x02	22 July 1978	The Autographs, Hi-Tension, The Lurkers, The Stranglers, The Boyfriends, Kandidate, The Boomtown Rats
1x03	29 July 1978	The Vibrators, The Roy Hill Band, Bonnie Tyler, Buzzcocks, Siouxsie and the Banshees, Sore Throat, Ian Dury and the Blockheads
1x04	5 August 1978	The Rezillos, Matumbi, The Motors, Nick Lowe, Brent Ford and the Nylons, Elvis Costello
1x05	12 August 1978	Fabulous Poodles, Dire Straits, The Boomtown Rats, Heatwave, Jab Jab, The Jam
1x06	19 August 1978	The Motors, The Shirts, Ian Dury and the Blockheads, Steve Gibbons Band, Goldie, Patrik Fitzgerald, Suzi Quatro
1x07	26 August 1978	Eddie Kidd, X-Ray Spex, The Roy Hill Band, Lindisfarne, Merger, C-Gas 5, Eddie and the Hot Rods
1x08	2 September 1978	David Coverdale and Whitesnake, The Tourists, Rich Kids, The Only Ones, The Showbiz Kids, Darts
