= Rich Kids =

English new wave band

- L-R; Steve New, Midge Ure, Rusty Egan, Glen Matlock

Background information
- Origin: London, England
- Genres: Punk rock; power pop; new wave
- Years active: 1977–1979 (reunions 2010, 2016 and 2019)
- Label: EMI
- Past members: Glen Matlock; Steve New; Rusty Egan; Midge Ure; Mick Jones; Bill Smyth

Rich Kids were a short-lived new wave band from London, founded in 1977 by Glen Matlock following his departure from the Sex Pistols. The band also included teenage guitarist Steve New, former Slik and future Ultravox member Midge Ure and Rusty Egan, who both later founded Visage together. They released one album and three singles during their existence, from March 1977 to December 1978 (although the official announcement of their disbanding was not made until mid-1979).

Rich Kids were amongst the foremost British exponents of the power pop style, blending influences from 1960s acts such as Small Faces and The Who with more recent punk rock sounds. Only the first of their three singles entered the Top 40 in the UK Singles Chart.

== Career ==
Rich Kids were formed in 1977 by bass player Glen Matlock after he left the Sex Pistols. An early line-up consisted of keyboardist Bill Smyth, Rusty Egan on drums, Steve New on lead guitar, and The Clash's Mick Jones. Midge Ure, whose band Slik had split up and reformed as the punk sounding PVC2, moved to London and joined Rich Kids. Smyth left the group followed by Jones, who continued with The Clash.

Rich Kids recorded their first set of radio sessions on 1 October 1977 for the 7 November broadcast of BBC Radio 1, hosted by DJ John Peel. Following on 13 January 1978, they were ranked at #24 on 4 February UK Charts with their first self-titled single "Rich Kids". This caught more attention from the BBC, who invited them to perform on Top of the Pops and several more sets for the short-lived live music TV series Revolver hosted by Peter Cook.

On 22 March, they recorded a further session for John Peel's 3 April broadcast. Another single, "Marching Men" was released on 19 May as means to promote the release of their album produced by Mick Ronson. Despite taping a video promo for Donnie Sutherland and After Dark, the song did not chart. At their Lyceum show in spring 1978, Ronson played guitar and Ian McLagan (ex-Faces) played keyboards. Several of the band's performances were featured in the 1980 film D.O.A..

Matlock and New later played with Sid Vicious in the band Vicious White Kids, which only played one concert.

The Rich Kids released the album Ghosts of Princes in Towers, and the single of the same name, in August, with the latter ranking only at No. 51. Their last TV appearance was at the University of Reading where they taped a live show for Rock Goes to College on 27 October. But the band ran into creative differences as they recorded demos for a second album. Having acquired a synthesiser, Ure, alongside bandmate Egan, wanted to integrate the new instrument into the band's sound while Matlock and New preferred to remain with traditional guitars and drums. This resulted in the group's decision to go their separate ways.

Matlock and New went on to tour with Iggy Pop, while Egan and Ure formed a band called The Misfits (not the American horror punk band Misfits) and, after short spells with Skids and Thin Lizzy, respectively, reunited in Visage. In April 1979, Ure joined Ultravox.

On 7 January 2010, the band played a one-off reunion concert at The O2 Academy Islington, London in aid of Steve New. New died from cancer on 24 May 2010.

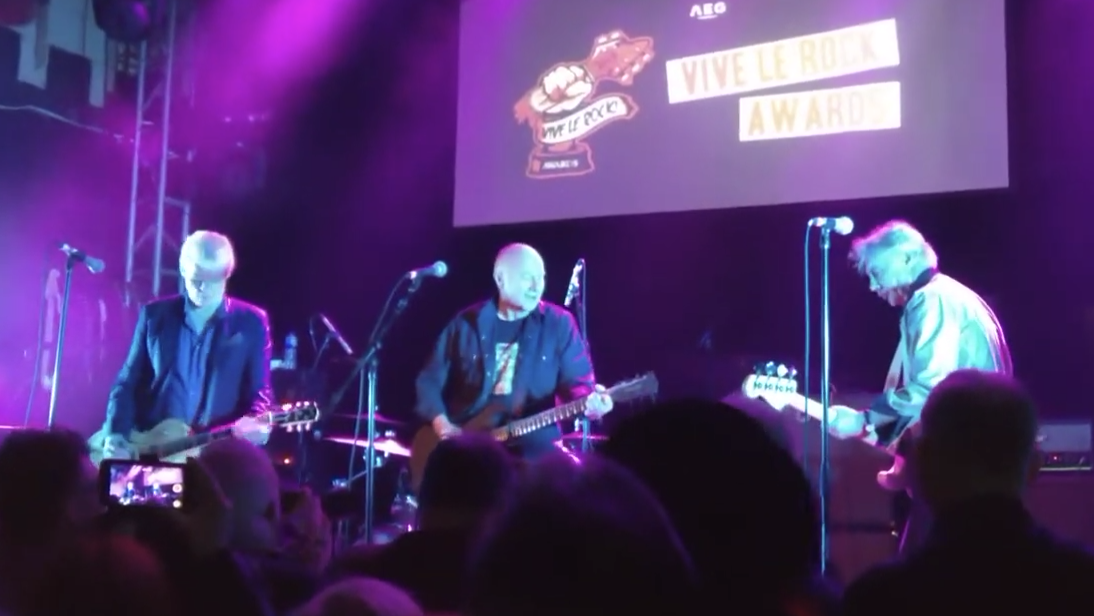
Rich Kids with Neal X on guitar in 2019.

In February 2016, it was announced that Rich Kids, with Gary Kemp on lead guitar and James Hallawell (Waterboys) on keyboard, would reform for a joint headline show with The Professionals at London's O2 Shepherd's Bush Empire for 16 May. The show was rescheduled for 23 June due to ongoing structural work at the venue.

The band reunited for a one-off appearance at the Vive Le Rock awards at The O2 Academy Islington, London on 27 March 2019, with Neal X of Sigue Sigue Sputnik standing in on lead guitar.

== Personnel ==
- Midge Ure − lead vocals, rhythm guitar, keyboards (1977–1979, 2010, 2016, 2019)
- Glen Matlock − bass, lead and backing vocals (1977–1979, 2010, 2016, 2019)
- Rusty Egan − drums (1977–1979, 2010, 2016, 2019)
- Steve New − lead guitar, keyboards, backing vocals (1977–1979, 2010; their death)
- Mick Jones − guitar, backing vocals (1977)
- Bill Smyth − keyboards (1977)

=== Guest musicians ===
- Gary Kemp – lead guitar, backing vocals (2016)
- James Hallawell – keyboards (2016)
- Neal X – lead guitar, backing vocals (2019)

== Discography ==
Studio albums

- 1978 – Ghosts of Princes in Towers (EMI, August 1978) No. 51

Singles

- 1978 – "Rich Kids" b/w "Empty Words" (EMI, January 1978) No. 24 (also released on red vinyl.)
- 1978 – "Marching Men" b/w "Here Comes the Nice (live)" (EMI, March 1978)
- 1978 – "Ghosts of Princes in Towers" b/w "Only Arsenic" (EMI, August 1978)

Compilations

- 1998 – Burning Sounds compilation. (Rev-Ola, September 1998)
- 2003 – Best of The Rich Kids compilation. (EMI, July 2003)

== See also ==
- D.O.A. (1980 film)
- List of Peel sessions
- List of British punk bands
- List of performers on Top of the Pops
- Timeline of punk rock
