= Susan Spungen =

American food writer, editor, and food stylist

- Education: Philadelphia College of Art
- Known for: food writer, editor, food stylist
- Spouse: Steven Kasher (m.2007)
- Parent(s): Franklin Spungen; Deborah Alterman Spungen
- Relatives: Nancy Spungen

Susan Spungen is an American food writer, editor, and food stylist. Spungen was founding food editor and editorial director of food at Martha Stewart Living Omnimedia, publisher of Martha Stewart Living magazine, from 1991 to 2003. She later published the books Recipes: A Collection for the Modern Cook (2005), What's a Hostess to Do? (2013), Open Kitchen (2020), and Veg Forward (2023), and worked as a culinary consultant for the films Julie & Julia and It's Complicated (both 2009), Eat Pray Love (2010), and Labor Day (2013).

== Early life and family ==
Spungen's parents were Franklin Spungen (1934–2010) and Deborah (née Alterman) Spungen (1937–2024). Spungen's father was a traveling salesman and was owner and chief executive of the Hamptons Paper Company in Water Mill, New York. Her mother was a social worker and founded the Anti-Violence Partnership of Philadelphia, a victim services organization, and was the organization's executive director upon her retirement. She later owned an organic food store named The Earth Shop in Jenkintown, near Philadelphia.

One of Spungen's grandmothers and her family fled their hometown of Zhmerynka, Ukraine, in the late 1910s due to anti-Jewish pogroms during the Russian Civil War. They ultimately landed in Philadelphia. A middle-class Jewish family, the Spungens lived in Huntingdon Valley, Lower Moreland Township, in the Philadelphia suburbs. During her childhood, Spungen remembers eating various Ashkenazi Jewish dishes her grandmother would make. She graduated from Lower Moreland High School.

Spungen has "mixed memories" of her sister, Nancy: "We were happy as kids and we played together and I looked up to her. I was 10 or 11 when she went to boarding school and then she wasn't home a lot."

When they were older, Nancy moved to New York City and began a relationship with Sex Pistols bassist Sid Vicious while visiting England. Nancy's death by stabbing in the Chelsea Hotel in 1978, several months after the couple returned to New York City, was well publicized.

== Career ==
=== Early food industry roles ===
Spungen initially sought to be an artist, and studied fine arts at the Philadelphia College of Art. She took an interest in working with food while working at the Warsaw Cafe and Steve Poses' restaurant, the Commissary, during that time. When her sister died, she was within her first month studying at college, and she dropped out of her studies. She moved to New York City when she was 22 years old. Working at an artist-run restaurant in SoHo, Manhattan, named FOOD, for four years, led her to conclude she did not want to pursue a career in the arts. She then worked as a caterer.

=== Work with Martha Stewart (1991–2003) ===
Spungen learned of food styling as a profession through a 1990 editorial on food styling in The New York Times, which featured professional food stylist Rick Ellis. The following year, in 1991, she was put into touch with Martha Stewart, who was looking for people to start a magazine. She had been working as a pastry chef at Coco Pazzo at the time. She started working with Stewart on photo shoots, and became founding food editor and editorial director at Martha Stewart Living Omnimedia in 1991. Spungen recalls: "From Day One, at Martha Stewart Living, I was producing, cooking and styling the food. I was doing everything." Later, she was led to work with Julia Child for one of Child's PBS cooking programs, Baking with Julia (1996). She also authored works with Stewart including Martha Stewart's Hors D'Oeuvres Handbook, published by Clarkson Potter in 1999, which The Washington Post praised as "a virtually exhaustive treatment of the subject". Spungen left the magazine in 2003, after 12 years as editor, and started freelancing.

=== Film consultant ===
Film director Nora Ephron invited Spungen to act as a culinary consultant for her film Julie & Julia (2009), starring Meryl Streep and Amy Adams in the title roles of Julia Child and Julie Powell, respectively. The majority of her work for Julie & Julia involved cooking and styling the food that appeared in the film.

Working alongside chef and food stylist Colin Flynn, Spungen was set to bake 25 cakes on one weekend for a scene depicting a birthday party for Child; cook bowls of meringue that would be whisked by Streep during a scene at Le Cordon Bleu cooking school in Paris; and search across Manhattan stores for Édel de Cléron, a French cheese to be eaten during a scene set in Paris. Spungen also taught Streep to make an omelet for a scene set at Le Cordon Bleu, taught cooking fundamentals to Adams, who was less experienced with cooking, and trained the cast how to debone a duck for one of Julia Child's signature dishes.

Spungen again worked with Streep on It's Complicated (2009) and with Julia Roberts for Eat Pray Love (2010). According to The Times, she spent several days making roast chickens for It's Complicated, as a new roast chicken was required for each take or angle during filming. For Labor Day (2013), which included a romantic scene in which Josh Brolin and Kate Winslet's characters cook a peach pie together, Spungen studied the recipe written in the original work. Spungen estimated that she made hundreds of pies with Brolin and the film staff over the course of one and a half months while practicing the scene. Jason Reitman's script specified that the scene should be the "greatest pie-making scene in cinema history" (written in all caps); Spungen has stated that this was "pretty much what convinced me". In his review of Labor Day, The New Yorker film critic Anthony Lane described the scene as "juicy masterwork".

=== Books and recipe writing ===
Spungen's Recipes: A Collection for the Modern Cook was published by William Morrow in 2005. It focuses on low-stress cooking, and includes food that Spungen said exhibited a "little bit more soul" than the "perfection" displayed in Martha Stewart Living magazine. Workman published her 2013 book, What's a Hostess to Do?, which provides advice on entertaining guests.

Spungen has produced recipes, styled food for photo shoots, and contributed to the New York Times, among other media outlets. The New York Times approached Spungen, who they called the "Babe Ruth of cookies", in 2019 to produce a "supersized cookie section" to be printed in newspapers for the holiday season. The project culminated in a newspaper section, titled "Cookies for the Modern Era", containing 12 recipes developed by Spungen.

In her cookbook Open Kitchen, published in 2020 by Avery Publishing, Spungen provides the term sprezzatura, meaning "studied nonchalance", for her philosophy for entertaining guests. The work was positively received by New York Times reviewer Melissa Clark, who wrote that "all of her food is modern, clever and, in our house, instantly devoured".

During the COVID-19 pandemic, in 2021, Spungen started an online cooking newsletter named Susanality. She published Veg Forward, a vegetable-focused cookbook, in 2023.

== Personal life ==
Spungen married Steven Kasher, owner of a photography gallery in Chelsea, in a wedding at the Blue Hill at Stone Barns in 2007.

== Bibliography ==
- Stewart, Martha; Spungen, Susan (1999). Martha Stewart's Hors D'Oeuvres Handbook. Clarkson Potter.
- Spungen, Susan (2005). Recipes: A Collection for the Modern Cook. William Morrow.
- — (2013). What's a Hostess to Do?. Workman.
- — (2017). The Artisanal Kitchen: Party Food: Go-To Recipes for Cocktail Parties, Buffets, Sit-Down Dinners, and Holiday Feasts. Artisan Publishers.
- — (2020). Open Kitchen: Inspired Food for Casual Gatherings. Avery Publishing.
- — (2023). Veg Forward: Super-Delicious Recipes that Put Produce at the Center of Your Plate. Harper Celebrate.
