= Nancy Spungen =

American girlfriend of Sid Vicious (1958–1978)

- Spungen in April 1978
- Born: Nancy Laura Spungen; February 27, 1958; Philadelphia, Pennsylvania, U.S.
- Died: October 12, 1978 (aged 20); New York City, U.S.
- Cause of death: Stab wound
- Partner: Sid Vicious (1977–1978)
- Parent(s): Franklin Spungen; Deborah Alterman Spungen
- Relatives: Susan Spungen (sister)

Nancy Laura Spungen (/ˈspʌŋɡən/; February 27, 1958 – October 12, 1978) was the American girlfriend of English musician Sid Vicious and a figure of the 1970s punk rock scene.

Born and raised in Philadelphia, Spungen was an emotionally disturbed child who was diagnosed with schizophrenia at age 15. After being expelled from college, she moved to New York City and became a stripper.

Known for being a groupie, she flew to London in December 1976 at the height of the punk rock movement, where she became involved with Vicious, the bassist for the Sex Pistols. Their relationship was tumultuous, characterized by domestic violence, substance abuse, and heroin addiction. Media labeled Spungen "Nauseating Nancy" for her outrageous and frequently antisocial behavior.

After John Lydon left the band and Vicious was made a focal point of subsequent band activities, the couple moved to New York City and checked into the Hotel Chelsea, Manhattan, where they spent much of their time using drugs, especially heroin.

In October 1978, Spungen was found dead in the bathroom of the couple's room at the Hotel Chelsea from a single stab wound to her abdomen. Vicious was charged with her second-degree murder but died of a heroin overdose while on bail in February 1979, before the case could be brought to trial. Various authors and filmmakers have speculated about Vicious' role in Spungen's death, and the possibility that she was killed by a drug dealer who frequently visited their room.

== Early life and education ==
Spungen was born on February 27, 1958, at the University of Pennsylvania Hospital in Philadelphia, to Franklin "Frank" (1934–2010) and Deborah Spungen (1937–2024). The Spungens were a middle-class Jewish family that resided in Lower Moreland Township, a Philadelphia suburb. Spungen's father was a traveling salesman and her mother later owned an organic food store called The Earth Shop in nearby Jenkintown. Her maternal family originally emigrated to the United States from Zhmerynka, Ukraine, following the pogroms during the Russian Civil War in the 1910s.

At the time of her birth, a newborn Spungen nearly died of oxygen deprivation after being choked by her umbilical cord during delivery; it was determined that she had not suffered any serious brain-damaging oxygen loss. However, it was then noted that her skin was jaundiced and that she showed symptoms of severe cyanosis, forcing the newborn to undergo immediate blood transfusions. Her parents were not able to see her or hold her at this point, preventing potential bonding-time. Instead, she was strapped restrained to a hospital bed and treated by medical staff, who ultimately saved her life. She was released from the hospital eight days after birth.

Spungen proved to be a difficult baby, throwing crying fits and temper tantrums late into childhood. At three months old, she was prescribed a liquid barbiturate by a pediatrician, something typically given to patients experiencing seizures. The medication was ineffective, and her violent behavior persisted. In 1983, Spungen's mother said, "I know it's normal for babies to cry, but Nancy did nothing but scream." Although she excelled academically, she had few friends during her elementary school years.

As a child, Spungen exhibited violent behavior toward her younger sister Susan, but was very caring toward her younger brother David. Susan, who later became a noted author and food stylist, said she had "mixed memories" of her sister: "We were happy as kids and we played together and I looked up to [Nancy]. I was 10 or 11 when she went to boarding school and then she wasn't home a lot."

Spungen allegedly threatened to kill a babysitter with scissors and attempted to batter a psychiatrist who had accused her of acting out for attention. At age 11, Spungen was expelled from public school after missing class over two weeks. Weary of her erratic behavior, her parents enrolled her at Devereux Glenholme School in Washington, Connecticut, and, later, at Devereux Manor High School in Berwyn, Pennsylvania. In January 1972, she ran away from Devereux Manor and attempted suicide by slitting her wrists with scissors. At age 15, her psychiatrist diagnosed her with schizophrenia.

Spungen graduated from Lakeside High School in 1974, two weeks after she was accepted to the University of Colorado Boulder. She began attending the university at age 16. Five months into her freshman year, she was arrested for attempting to purchase marijuana from an undercover police officer. After she was arrested a second time for storing stolen property in her dorm room, CU Boulder expelled her. Spungen's father traveled to Boulder and accepted a plea bargain on her behalf, under which she agreed to be banished from the state of Colorado.

== Relationship with Sid Vicious ==
Spungen left home at age 17 and moved to New York City, where she supported herself via prostitution, amateur music journalism, and working at clothing stores. In her free time, she became a groupie and followed rock bands, including Aerosmith, Bad Company, the New York Dolls, and the Ramones.

In December 1976, Spungen flew to London with The Heartbreakers and met the Sex Pistols, which later included bassist Sid Vicious. Vicious and Spungen first met the night she arrived in London. After being rejected by John Lydon, Nancy and Sid started a relationship, moving in together in March 1977.

Over their 19-month relationship from March 1977 to October 1978, Spungen and Vicious developed heroin addictions; Vicious was already using multiple drugs prior to meeting Spungen. Tabloids dubbed Spungen "Nauseating Nancy" for her frequent public outbursts.

In January 1978, following the breakup of the Sex Pistols, Spungen and Vicious relocated to New York City, where they lived in Room 100 at the Hotel Chelsea, where they were registered as "Mr. and Mrs. John Simon Ritchie", Vicious' real name.

== Death ==
On October 12, 1978, Spungen's body was found under the sink in the bathroom of their room at the Hotel Chelsea. She had suffered a stab wound to the abdomen. Vicious owned the knife that inflicted the injury, a Jaguar Wilderness K-11 with a five-inch (13 cm) blade. Press misreported the murder weapon as a different knife owned by Vicious, a "007" hunting knife.

Vicious shared conflicting stories of the night Spungen died. He was immediately arrested, charged with second-degree murder, and released on $50,000 bail. Four months after Spungen's death, Vicious died of a heroin overdose prior to his trial's taking place. The New York City Police Department closed the case after Vicious' death.

Spungen is buried in the King David Memorial Park, a traditional Jewish cemetery in Bensalem Township, Pennsylvania.

There are various theories about the cause of Spungen's death. Some of them do not implicate Vicious in her murder. One such theory is that two drug dealers visited their room that night and conducted a robbery. Certain items, including a substantial amount of money, were claimed to be missing from the room.

In his book Pretty Vacant: A History of Punk, Phil Strongman accuses actor and stand-up comic Rockets Redglare of killing Spungen; Redglare delivered drugs to the couple's room the night of Spungen's death. Throughout his life, Redglare (who died in 2001) steadfastly denied to the press any involvement in the killing, but allegedly confessed to the killing within his circle of friends.

== In popular culture ==
- In 1979, "Horror Business", a 1979 song by the American punk rock band the Misfits, was inspired by Spungen's murder. The song's lyrics include lines, such as: "You don't go in the bathroom with me" and "I'll put a knife right in you." Prior to Vicious's death, the Misfits were rumored to back Vicious on his proposed debut solo album. Misfits bassist Jerry Only attended a dinner gathering at the apartment of Michelle Robison, Vicious's new girlfriend, the night Vicious died.
- In 1982, the poet Thom Gunn published a poem about Spungen, entitled "The Victim." It appeared in his volume, The Passages of Joy.
- In 1983, Spungen's mother Deborah wrote a memoir, And I Don't Want to Live This Life. Its title is taken from a poem Vicious wrote.
- In 1986, the film Sid and Nancy, directed by Alex Cox, was released, portraying the life of Vicious, played by Gary Oldman, and his relationship with Spungen, played by Chloe Webb. Critics praised Webb's performance as Spungen. In the film, Cox also put forth the theory that Spungen and Vicious had a suicide pact.
- In the 2000 song, "Butterfly" by Crazy Town. the lyrics reference Sid and Nancy.
- In the 2001 song, "Jessica" by Dir en Grey. The lyrics are about Sid Vicious and his relationship with Nancy.
- The 2006 anime Nana references Sid and Nancy's relationship and its punk/rock aesthetics, particularly when it comes to two main characters.
- In 2007, Veronica Schanoes's story "Rats" appeared at the 2007 Interstitial Arts Foundation anthology, Interfictions. The story is a punk rock fairytale inspired by Spungen's life. Schanoes said, "I wrote 'Rats' because I was angry with the way the recent coffee-table histories of punk seem to have no problem demonizing a dead, mentally ill, teenage girl."
- In 2010, a documentary film Who Killed Nancy?, directed by Alan G. Parker, was released, and includes interviews with Vicious and Spungen's associates, including John Holmstrom, Don Letts, Glen Matlock, and Howie Pyro.
- In 2013, Spungen was portrayed by Tamsin Egerton in episode 4, series 1 of the British sketch comedy show Psychobitches. She appears among the famous women from history and fiction who are interviewed by a therapist played by Rebecca Front.
- In 2022, Pistol, a miniseries, was released, with Vicious portrayed by Louis Partridge. The miniseries depicts Vicious as waking up in a confused state the morning after Spungen's death with apparently vague recollections of an altercation the previous night. He is then horrified to find Spungen, played by Emma Appleton, dead in the bathroom. This version appears to accept Vicious's account that he had no memory of how Spungen had been injured.
- The Weezer song “We Might as Well Be Strangers,” featuring Wednesday from the band’s 2026 self-titled album (commonly known as the Gold Album), references Sid Vicious and Nancy Spungen in the lyric, “I was Nancy, you were Vicious.”

== Sources ==
- Spungen, Deborah (1983). And I Don't Want to Live This Life. New York City: Random House Inc. ISBN 978-0394533728.
- Greene, James Jr. (2013). This Music Leaves Stains: The Complete Story of the Misfits. Lanham, Md.: Scarecrow Press. ISBN 9781589798922. OCLC 859433639.
