= Steve New =

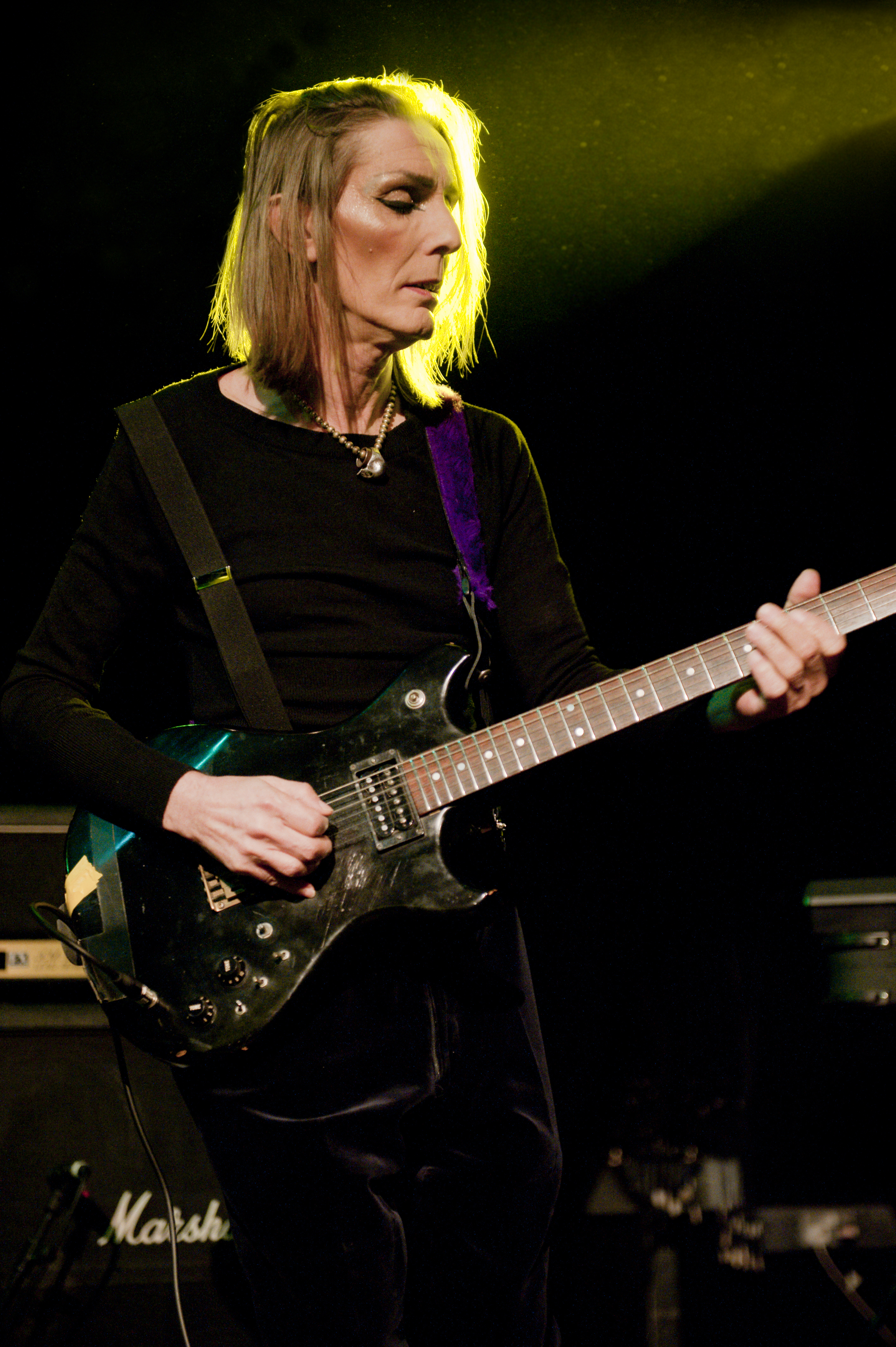
- Stella Nova on stage with re-united Rich Kids in January 2010

Background information
- Also known as: Shooz, Stella Nova
- Born: Stephen Charles New; 16 May 1960; Paddington, London, England
- Died: 24 May 2010 (aged 50) London, England
- Genres: Punk rock, post-punk, new wave, synthpop, experimental
- Instruments: Guitar, vocals
- Years active: 1975–2010
- Label: EMI

Stella Nova (born Stephen Charles New; 16 May 1960 – 24 May 2010), was an English guitarist and singer who performed with a number of punk rock and new wave bands in the late 1970s and early 1980s, including the Rich Kids. In the 2000s, he changed his name to Stella Nova, whilst performing with the band Beastellabeast.

== Early life ==
Born in Paddington in London, Nova received formal education at Quintin Kynaston School in St. John's Wood, London, and started playing the guitar with the London Schools' Jazz Orchestra at the age of 14.

== Musical career ==
Nova first came to be noticed as a talented lead guitarist with a unique playing style at the beginning of London's punk rock music and fashion scene in the mid-1970s. In September 1975 at the age of 15 Nova successfully auditioned for and rehearsed with the Sex Pistols before Nova became publicly known as a lead guitarist, with Steve Jones playing rhythm guitar, but Nova was let go after a few weeks as Jones’ lead guitar playing was rapidly improving to the point that the band no longer needed an additional lead guitarist and Nova got a day-job working in the London office of Warner Bros. Records as a junior postal clerk.

When the bass player Glen Matlock left the Sex Pistols in early 1977 he invited Nova, then only 16 years old, to join a new band that he was forming called Rich Kids as its lead guitarist. On 15 August 1978, whilst still with Rich Kids, Nova performed with a one night only line-up titled the Vicious White Kids at the Electric Ballroom in Camden Town, in what came to be seen as one of the events that marked the last hurrah of the punk rock movement's heyday in London. Whilst Rich Kids was musically gifted, it failed to find commercial success and broke up in early 1979 after the commercial failure of two of its three singles releases and first long-player release titled Ghosts of Princes in Towers (which reached No. 51 in the UK Album Chart in 1978), and Nova's career was undermined beyond this period by long-term narcotics use.

Unable to find another band to join after the Rich Kids, Nova resorted to working as a jobbing guitar for hire with a number of acts, including Public Image Ltd and Wasted Youth.

Nova rehearsed and recorded with the band Gen X in 1980, both in demo-sessions and on their long-player Kiss Me Deadly, playing the guitar track on the "Dancing with Myself" single release. The lead singer Billy Idol and bassist Tony James wanted Nova to be the newly re-branded band's lead guitarist, but they reluctantly decided against it due to Nova's professional unreliability caused by an increasingly severe narcotic habit. The Gen X song "Heavens Inside" was written by Billy Idol about Nova.

After the Gen X opportunity had fallen through, Nova worked as a session musician, going on tour with Iggy Pop, on whose Soldier L.P. (1980) Nova played, during the recording of which Nova assaulted David Bowie who was acting as a quasi-producer of the record at the time. Nova also worked with Chrissie Hynde, Johnny Thunders, Patti Palladin, Kim Fowley, and Pearl Harbour.

In the early 1980s Nova rejected an offer to play with Duran Duran at its inception. Nova also recorded under the stage name of "Shooz". Having relocated to the United States in the 1980s, by the mid-1990s Nova was resident in Los Angeles, but failed to find musical success there, and ended up homeless, living in a car for a while before returning to England.

In 2001 Nova released a solo long-player entitled Here Comes Everybody.

In the early 2000s Nova formed a new experimental pop band entitled Beastellabeast with the young singer Beatrice Brown, whom Nova had become the mentor of after they met whilst both temporarily employed as guides at a publicity event for a cinema film at the Wembley Exhibition Hall in 1998, which released three self-produced LPs, viz. With Bestellabeast (2004), Beastiality (2009) and Stars & Wronguns (2010).

Nova worked again with Glen Matlock, whose solo album Born Running (2010) was dedicated to Nova, and featured Nova's last recorded work.

== Death ==
Afflicted with what would prove to be terminal cancer, Nova performed live for the last time with Beastellabeast and a reformed Rich Kids at the Islington Academy in London on 7 January 2010, at a testimonial concert organised for Nova's family's finances. Nova died of cancer on 24 May 2010 at the age of 50.

A funeral service was held at the Islington & St. Pancras Cemetery in East Finchley on 11 June 2010, Glen Matlock, Tony James, Rhys Mwyn and Terry Edwards being among the pallbearers, where Nova's body was cremated.

== Personal life ==
In the late 1970s, Nova was in a relationship with Patti Palladin for three years. He had a daughter in his marriage to Wendy, and a son in another relationship. In the early 2000s Nova adopted transvestism, a decision Nova associated with success in breaking a 20-year-long drug habit. Though Nova never expressed a clear preference in writing about preferred pronouns, Nova was consistently referred to as he/him in life and in works written by friends, although Nova also described himself privately as having "been a tranny from day one", saying, "I was completely ashamed of that fact. It was always a secret life."
