= Glen Matlock =

British bassist (born 1956)

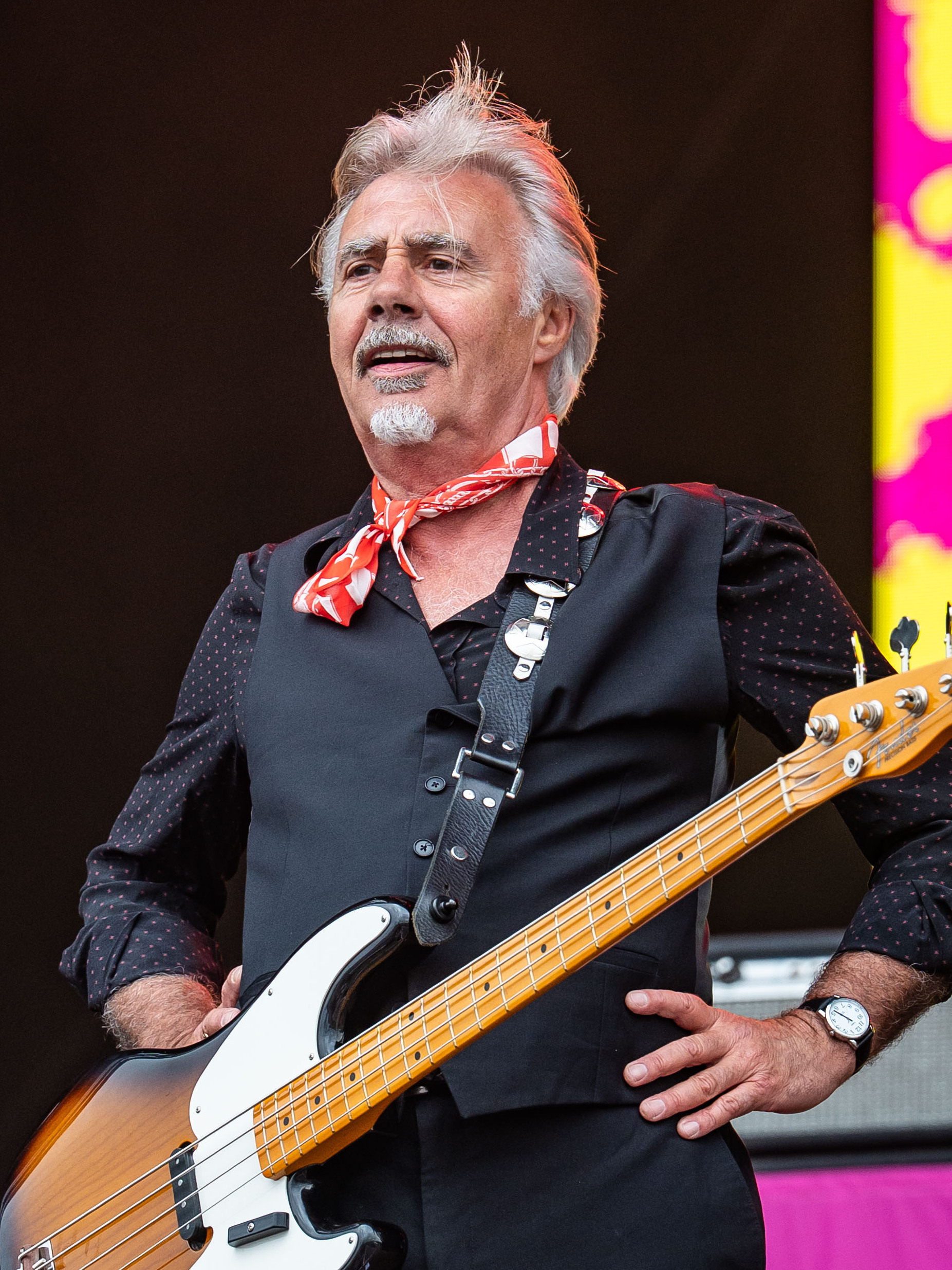
- Matlock with the Sex Pistols in 2025

Background information
- Born: 27 August 1956 (age 70); London, England
- Origin: Paddington, London
- Genres: Punk rock; rockabilly; new wave
- Occupations: Musician; songwriter
- Instruments: Bass guitar; guitar; vocals
- Years active: 1973–present
- Member of: Sex Pistols; The International Swingers; Blondie
- Formerly of: The Swankers; Rich Kids; Vicious White Kids; Bette Bright and the Illuminations; The Jimmy Norton Explosion; The Spectres; Hot Club; The London Cowboys; C.B.I. (Concrete Bulletproof Invisible); Glen Matlock & the Mavericks; Dead Horse; The Philistines; Dead Men Walking; The Flying Padovanis; Slinky Vagabond; Faces

Glen Matlock (born 27 August 1956) is an English musician and the bass guitarist in the original line-up of the punk rock band the Sex Pistols. He is credited as a songwriter on 10 of the 12 songs on the Sex Pistols' only officially released studio album, Never Mind the Bollocks, Here's the Sex Pistols, although he had left the band early in the recording process, he played bass on one song on the album, "Anarchy in the U.K." However, on the bootleg album Spunk, Matlock played bass on all the songs, which included earlier studio recordings of 10 of the 12 songs that later appeared on the Bollocks album.

Since leaving the Sex Pistols in 1977, he has performed with several other bands, including Rich Kids, who scored a UK No. 24 hit with the single "Rich Kids" in 1978, as well as presenting his own work. After the death of his replacement in the Sex Pistols, Sid Vicious, Matlock has resumed bass guitar duties for subsequent Sex Pistols reunions, including the 1996 Filthy Lucre Tour, the 2002 concert to commemorate the Golden Jubilee of Elizabeth II, their 2003 North American Piss Off Tour, their 2007–08 UK and Europe Combine Harvester Tour and their current incarnation with Frank Carter guesting on vocals.

== Biography ==
=== Early years ===
Matlock was born 1956 in Kensal Green, Paddington, London, to factory workers. He attended St. Clement Danes School (then based in Hammersmith), followed by Saint Martin's School of Art until 1974.

=== Sex Pistols ===
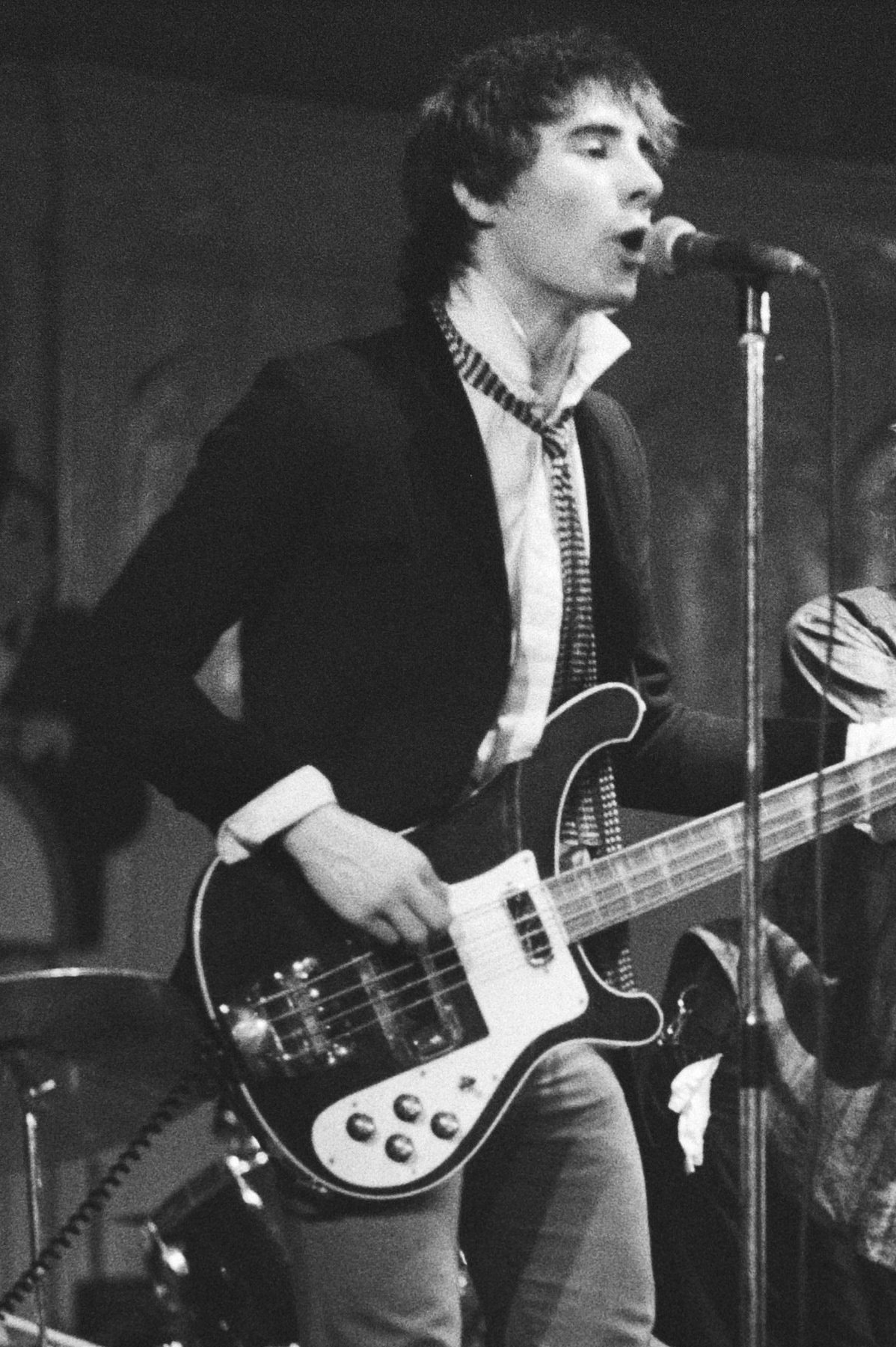
Matlock playing with the Sex Pistols in Amsterdam, January, 1977.

Matlock was the original bass player of the Sex Pistols, having been introduced to guitarist Steve Jones and drummer Paul Cook while working in Sex, Malcolm McLaren's clothing boutique in London, and initially playing with them in a band called The Swankers. He is credited as co-writer on 10 of the 12 songs appearing on the Sex Pistols album Never Mind the Bollocks, Here's the Sex Pistols, and as bassist and backing vocalist on the song "Anarchy in the U.K.". However, his overall contribution to the album has been disputed: Jones said in a 2011 interview he was "tired of Matlock's claims that he had co-written some of the punk icon's biggest tunes", stating that he himself had written as many songs as Matlock, whilst Matlock himself notes in his autobiography, I Was a Teenage Sex Pistol, that the band only wrote two songs after his departure. According to a 2014 interview, he played a big role in writing the songs that appeared on the album. Cook has stated that Matlock actually wrote most of the songs on the album. Additionally, whilst Jones has insisted that Matlock disliked many of Johnny Rotten's lyrics, Matlock has said that he had no issue with them.

Matlock left the band in late February 1977, with contemporary reports (given to news outlets by manager Malcolm McLaren) stating that he was 'thrown out' because he liked the Beatles. The claim was fictional, with Steve Huey of AllMusic claiming that Matlock "was even more enamored of the Faces and the mod groups prominently featured on London pirate radio in the late '60s, as were Steve Jones and Paul Cook". Another claim, made at the time by Jones, that he thought it bizarre that Matlock was "always washing his feet", has also been misquoted and misinterpreted as the cause of Matlock's firing from the group.

In I Was a Teenage Sex Pistol, Matlock stated that he left the band of his own volition as he was "sick of all the bullshit". In the 2000 documentary The Filth and the Fury, the band members generally agree that there was tension between Matlock and Rotten, which Matlock suggests was further aggravated by Malcolm McLaren in an attempt to generate chaos within the band as a creative mechanism.

In his autobiography, Rotten: No Irish, No Blacks, No Dogs, John Lydon stated that Matlock worked on Sex Pistols material (including their album Never Mind the Bollocks, Here's the Sex Pistols), after he had left the band, as a paid session musician. However, Matlock denied the "session musician" label, stating that all but two of the songs appearing on the album had already been recorded as singles or b-sides before his departure. Jones played bass on the two songs recorded after Matlock's departure and overdubbed some additional parts on other existing songs, with Vicious also contributing to the song "Bodies". Music historian David Howard states that Matlock did not participate in any of the Never Mind the Bollocks recording sessions. In the 2002 Classic Albums documentary about Never Mind the Bollocks, Here's the Sex Pistols, Jones stated that in retrospect, pushing Matlock out of the band was a mistake: "We were what we were. Who cares if he washed his feet? That was him. I'm sure I had things that bugged him". He also conceded that the band could have recorded more albums had Matlock stayed and they had not participated in the television interview with Bill Grundy.

=== After the Sex Pistols ===
Matlock went on to form Rich Kids, a new wave power pop band, with himself as bass guitarist and singer, Midge Ure (guitarist, singer and keyboard player), Steve New (guitarist and singer) and Rusty Egan (drummer). They released three singles and one album entitled Ghosts of Princes in Towers (which reached No. 51). Matlock and New later played with Vicious in the short-lived band Vicious White Kids.

After Rich Kids, he formed the Spectres with Tom Robinson Band guitarist Danny Kustow, and subsequently Mick Hanson, and then Hot Club in 1982 with guitarist James Stevenson and singer Steve Allen. Matlock also played bass on the Iggy Pop album Soldier and the Damned album Not of This Earth. Under the moniker Rhode-Twinn, Matlock (and Steve New) was brought to play on Gary Twinn's 1990 single "Bike Boy" on Bernard Rhodes' own Sacred record label. Twinn and Matlock stayed in touch and began writing and recording with the Damned drummer Rat Scabies and Generation X guitarist Bob "Derwood" Andrews as Dead Horse in 1996. A US tour was arranged, but almost immediately Matlock reunited with the Sex Pistols and the group was disbanded. He also internationally toured as bass player with Johnny Thunders in 1986 Matlock then re-joined the original Sex Pistols members for reunion tours in 1996, 2002, 2003, 2007 and 2008. He played bass guitar and sang for a time in the bands the Philistines and the Flying Padovanis. He toured with a loose collective of punk and post-punk stars, Dead Men Walking, which included Mike Peters of the Alarm, Kirk Brandon of Theatre of Hate and Spear of Destiny, and Pete Wylie of Wah! He is now a member of Slinky Vagabond with Earl Slick, Clem Burke and Keanan Duffty. Slinky Vagabond played their debut concert at the Joey Ramone Birthday Bash in May 2007. One newspaper, comparing the current lifestyles of the Sex Pistols, wrote: "Only original bassist Glen Matlock remains touring with his own band, an irony given that he was sacked for being too conservative".

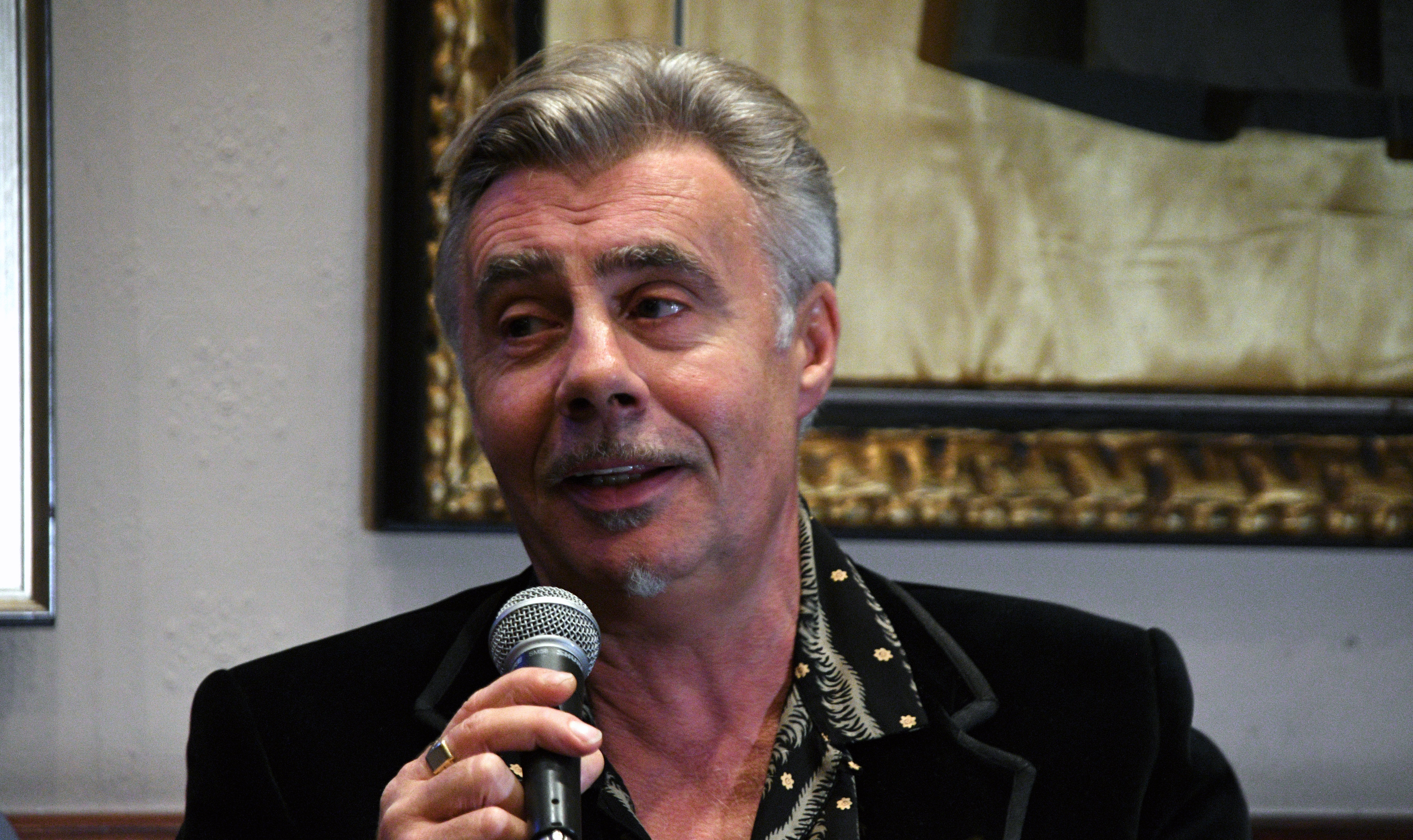
Matlock in 2017

In January 2010, Glen Matlock reformed Rich Kids for a one-off benefit concert in aid of Steve New. He was joined on stage by original members Rusty Egan and Midge Ure, as well as Mick Jones of the Clash and Gary Kemp from Spandau Ballet. New died of cancer on 24 May 2010.

Matlock joined a reformed Faces, playing at the Vintage at Goodwood festival near Chichester in August 2010. In April 2011, he stood in for Mani playing bass for Primal Scream at the Japan Tsunami appeal concert at Brixton Academy in London.

In late 2011, the International Swingers, a band comprising Matlock, Clem Burke, James Stevenson and Gary Twinn, was formed. The band, based in Los Angeles, toured Australia and the USA and continues to perform occasionally and released a self titled album in 2015.

In 2012, Matlock made his acting debut in British drama film The Paddy Lincoln Gang, performing a docudrama scene at a live Faces concert.

In 2013 and 2014, he toured with the New York Dolls' Sylvain Sylvain on the Sex Dolls Tour. He has spoken publicly against Brexit.

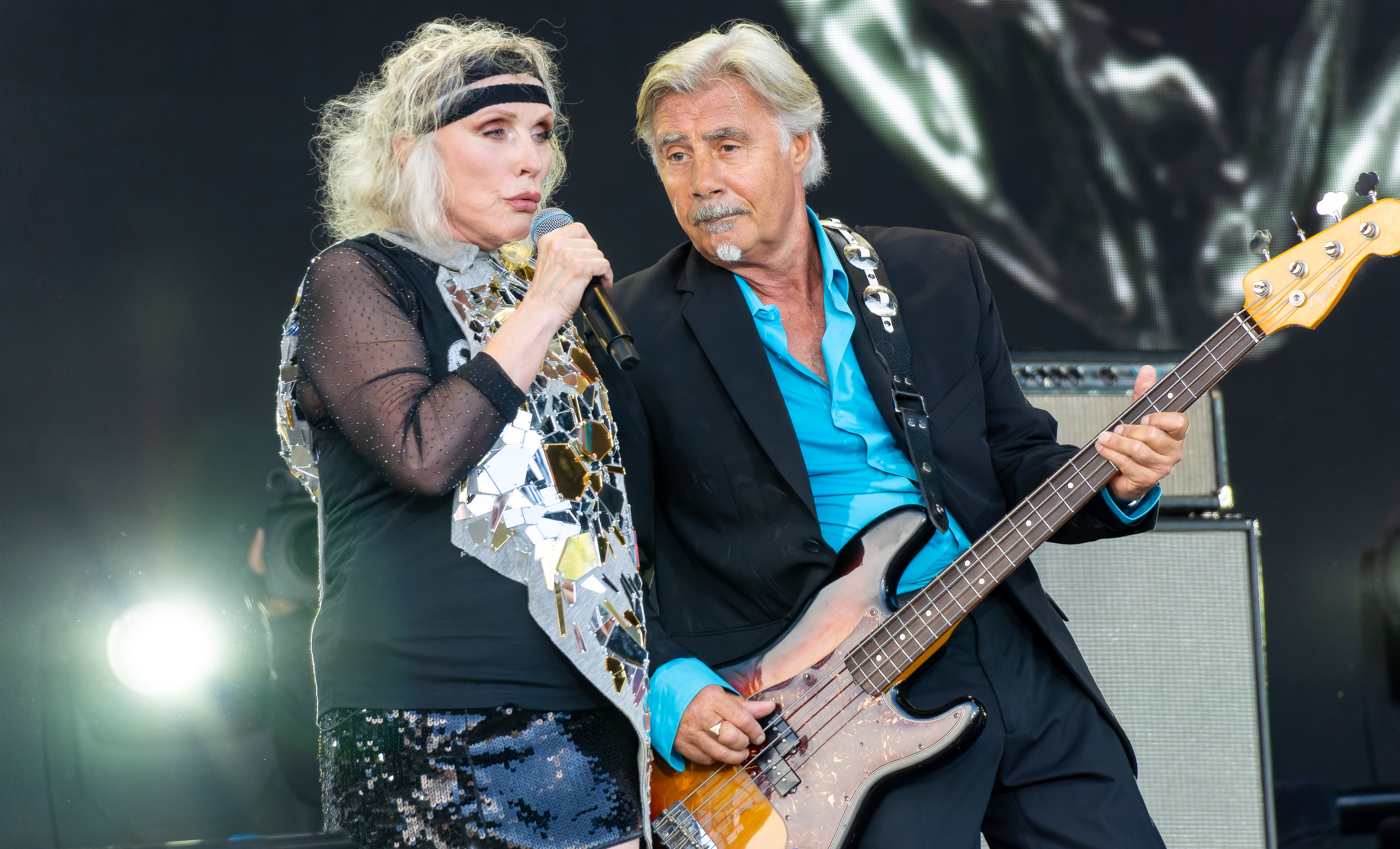
Matlock (right) performing with Blondie in 2023.

Matlock joined Blondie for their April 2022 UK and US tour, filling in for bassist Leigh Foxx who was unable to tour due to a back injury. This continued into the 2023 festival season with Matlock playing with the band at Glastonbury festival. He also played the April 2024 festival shows in Australia.

Matlock is portrayed by Christian Lees in the 2022 Craig Pearce - Danny Boyle FX biographical drama miniseries, Pistol. Matlock said he was very disappointed with the series: "My portrayal, and particularly my leaving the band — I left the band; I was not sacked and fired. That whole episode (Track 4 : Pretty Vaaayyycunt) where Steve sacked [me] is just a load of bollocks."

He signed a new worldwide record deal with Cooking Vinyl and released his new album, Consequences Coming, on 27 April 2023. The first single released was "Head On A Stick". "The album was written and recorded in Britain over the last 18 months or so with a posse of seasoned but on-point performers," Matlock said. "All done during the debacle that is Brexit and the rise and fall of the turgid Trump episode in the US. These songs reflect my take on the whole sorry mess that has ensued".

== Personal life ==
Matlock's sons, Sam and Louis, are also musicians, who have played in Dead!. After that band’s breakup, Sam formed Wargasm and Louis formed Clarence And The Modern Life.

== Discography ==
=== Sex Pistols ===
- 1977 – Never Mind the Bollocks, Here's the Sex Pistols

Sex Pistols compilations

- 1977 – Spunk
- 1979 – The Great Rock 'n' Roll Swindle
- 1980 – Flogging a Dead Horse
- 1980 – Sex Pack
- 1985 – Anarchy in the UK – Live at the 76 Club
- 1992 – Kiss This
- 1996 – Filthy Lucre Live
- 2002 – Jubilee
- 2002 – Sex Pistols Box Set
- 2008 – Agents of Anarchy
- 2008 – Live & Filthy

=== Rich Kids ===
- 1978 – Ghosts of Princes in Towers

Rich Kids compilations

- 1998 – Burning Sounds
- 2003 – Best of the Rich Kids

=== Vicious White Kids ===
- 1978 – The Vicious White Kids featuring Sid Vicious (unreleased until 1991.)

=== Iggy Pop ===
- 1980 – Soldier

=== The Damned ===
- 1995 – Not of This Earth

=== Glen Matlock & The Philistines ===
- 1996 – Who's He Think He Is When He's at Home? (Solo album.)
- 2000 – Open Mind
- 2004 – On Something
- 2010 – Born Running
- 2013 – Rattle Your Cage: The Best of Glen Matlock & The Philistines
- 2018 – Good to Go
- 2023 – Consequences Coming

=== The International Swingers ===
- 2012 – International Swingers EP (limited release.)
- 2013 – Gun Control EP (limited release.)
- 2015 – Whatever Works Now

== Bibliography ==
- Matlock, Glen (2012) [1996]. I Was a Teenage Sex Pistol (2nd ed.). Rocket 88. ISBN 978-1-90661-536-9.
- Matlock, Glen (2023). Triggers. Weldon/Owen. ISBN 979-8-88674-181-0.
