= Sex Pistols =

English punk rock band

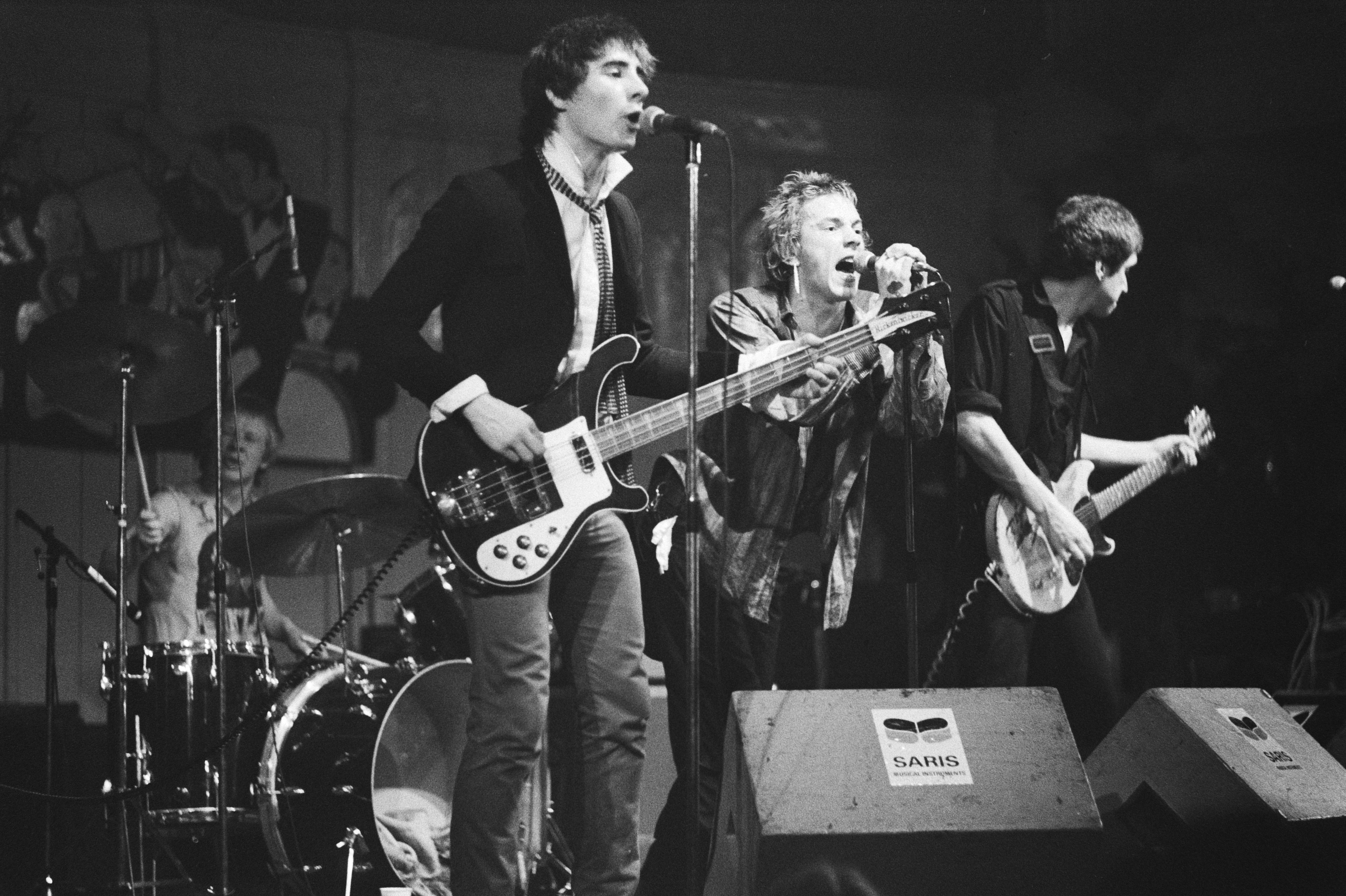
- Original lineup of the Sex Pistols performing in Amsterdam in January 1977. Left to right: Paul Cook (behind the drums), Glen Matlock, Johnny Rotten, and Steve Jones.

Background information
- Also known as: QT Jones and the Sex Pistols
- Origin: London, England
- Genre: Punk rock
- Works: Discography
- Years active: 1975–1978; 1996; 2002–2003; 2007–2008; 2024–present
- Labels: EMI; A&M; Virgin; Universal; Warner Bros.
- Spinoffs: Rich Kids; Public Image Ltd; Vicious White Kids; Sham Pistols; The Professionals; Generation Sex
- Spinoff of: The Strand
- Members: Steve Jones; Paul Cook; Glen Matlock
- Past members: Johnny Rotten; Sid Vicious
- Website: sexpistolsofficial.com

The Sex Pistols are an English punk rock band formed in London in 1975. Although their initial career lasted just two and a half years, they became culturally influential in popular music. The band initiated the punk movement in the United Kingdom, with their clothes and hairstyles becoming a significant influence on the punk subculture and fashion.

The Sex Pistols' first line-up consisted of vocalist Johnny Rotten (stage name of John Lydon), guitarist Steve Jones, drummer Paul Cook, and bassist Glen Matlock, with Matlock replaced by Sid Vicious in early 1977. Under the management of Malcolm McLaren, the band gained widespread attention from British press after swearing live on-air during a December 1976 television interview. Their performances at Manchester's Lesser Free Trade Hall inspired several successful bands to form and influenced the development of England's independent music scene.

Their May 1977 single "God Save the Queen", which described the monarchy as a "fascist regime", was released to coincide with national celebrations for the Queen's Silver Jubilee. The song was promptly banned from being played by the BBC and by nearly every independent radio station in Britain, making it the most censored record in British history. Their sole studio album Never Mind the Bollocks, Here's the Sex Pistols (1977) was a UK number one and is regarded as seminal in the development of punk rock. In January 1978, at the final gig of a difficult and media-hyped tour of the US, Rotten announced the band's break-up live on stage. Over the next few months, the three remaining members recorded songs for McLaren's film of the Sex Pistols' story, The Great Rock 'n' Roll Swindle. Vicious died of a heroin overdose in February 1979 following his arrest for the alleged murder of his girlfriend, Nancy Spungen. Rotten, Jones, Cook and Matlock later reunited for a successful tour in 1996. Further one-off performances and short tours followed over the next decade. In 2024, Jones, Cook, and Matlock reformed the Sex Pistols, with guest vocalist Frank Carter performing in place of Rotten, and have embarked on several tours since.

The Sex Pistols have been recognised as a highly influential band. In 2006, they were inducted into the Rock and Roll Hall of Fame although they refused to attend the ceremony, with Rotten referring to the museum as "a piss stain".

== History ==
=== Formation ===
The Sex Pistols evolved from the Strand (later known as the Swankers), formed in London in 1972 by teenagers Steve Jones on vocals, Paul Cook on drums and Wally Nightingale on guitar. According to Jones, both he and Cook played on instruments he had stolen. The band regularly hung out at two clothing shops on the King's Road in Chelsea, London: John Krivine and Steph Raynor's Acme Attractions and Malcolm McLaren and Vivienne Westwood's Too Fast to Live, Too Young to Die. McLaren's and Westwood's shop had opened in 1971 as Let It Rock, with a 1950s revival Teddy Boy theme. It had been renamed in 1972 to focus on another revival trend, the 1950s rocker look. The shop then became a focal point of the early London punk rock scene, and in late 1974, Jones asked McLaren to take over the Strand's management. Glen Matlock, an art student who occasionally worked at the shop, joined as bassist. McLaren and Westwood conceived a new identity for their shop: renamed Sex, it changed its focus away from retro 1950s couture to S&M-inspired "anti-fashion". After managing and promoting the New York Dolls, McLaren returned to London in May 1975 and began to take more of an interest in the Strand.

The group had been rehearsing regularly, overseen by Bernard Rhodes (who would later go on to manage the Clash) and performing live. Soon after McLaren's return, Nightingale was dismissed. Jones, Cook, and Matlock continued playing together under the name QT Jones and the Sex Pistols, with Jones taking over on guitar. New Musical Express journalist Nick Kent was asked to play second guitar with the band, and did so for three months. However, Matlock has since insisted that Kent wasn't a band member but, "just a mate who'd come and play with us every now and then."

With Jones becoming uncomfortable as a lead singer, the first part of the name was dropped, and McLaren began looking for a lead vocalist. He had been talking with the New York Dolls' Sylvain Sylvain about coming over to England to front the group, but those plans fell through. As described by Matlock, "Everyone had long hair back then, even the milkman, so what we used to do was if someone had short hair we would stop them in the street and ask them if they fancied themselves as a singer". For instance, Midge Ure, the later front man of Rich Kids (with Matlock) and Ultravox, claims to have been approached, but refused the offer. With the search for a lead singer proving fruitless, McLaren made several calls to Richard Hell, who also turned down the invitation.

=== Lydon joins ===
The Sex Pistols, early 1976; from left: Rotten, Jones, Matlock and Cook

Describing the social context in which the band formed, John Lydon said that mid-seventies Britain was "a very depressing place ... completely run-down, there was trash on the streets, total unemployment, just about everybody was on strike ... if you came from the wrong side of the tracks ... then you had no hope in hell and no career prospects at all."

In August 1975, Rhodes spotted Lydon, then 19 years old, wearing a Pink Floyd T-shirt with the words 'I Hate' handwritten above the band's name and holes scratched through the Floyd members' eyes. Soon after, either Rhodes or McLaren asked Lydon to audition. During the session, Lydon improvised to Alice Cooper's "I'm Eighteen" on the Sex jukebox. According to Jones, "he came in with green hair. I thought he had a really interesting face. I liked his look. He had the 'I Hate Pink Floyd' T-shirt on...held together with safety pins... he was a real arsehole—but smart." Jones renamed Lydon as "Johnny Rotten" as a joke, apparently because of his particularly bad teeth.

An advertisement was placed in Melody Maker looking for a "whizz kid guitarist ... not older than 20 ... not worse looking than Johnny Thunders." As Steve New was the most talented guitarist to audition, he was asked to join. However, Jones' playing had greatly improved, and New left a month after joining the band.

The Sex Pistols in August 1975, from left: Rotten, Matlock, Jones, and Cook

After considering band name options such as Le Bomb, Subterraneans, the Damned, Beyond, Teenage Novel, Kid Gladlove, and Crème de la Crème, they decided on Sex Pistols. Matlock said the band decided on the name while McLaren was in the United States before Rotten joined. Jon Savage says the name was not firmly settled on until just before their first show in November 1975. McLaren later said the name derived "from the idea of a pistol, a pin-up, a young thing, a better-looking assassin". Not given to modesty, false or otherwise, he added: "[I] launched the idea in the form of a band of kids who could be perceived as being bad." The group began writing original material: Rotten was the lyricist and Matlock the primary melody writer (though their first collaboration, "Pretty Vacant", had all lyrics by Matlock, which Rotten tweaked a bit); official credit was shared equally among the four.

Their first gig was arranged by Matlock, then studying at Saint Martin's School of Art. The band played at the school on 6 November 1975, supporting the pub rock group Bazooka Joe. They performed several covers including the Who's "Substitute", the Small Faces' "Whatcha Gonna Do About It", and the Monkees' "(I'm Not Your) Steppin' Stone".

=== Early following and Anarchy in the U.K. single ===
The Saint Martins gig was followed by performances at colleges around London. The band's core early followers—including Siouxsie Sioux, Steven Severin and Billy Idol, Jordan, and Soo Catwoman—came to be known as the Bromley Contingent, after the suburban south-east London borough that several of them were from. Their cutting-edge fashion, much of it supplied by Sex, ignited a trend that was adopted by the new fans the band attracted. McLaren and Westwood saw the incipient London punk movement as a vehicle for more than just couture. They were influenced by the May 1968 radical uprising in Paris, particularly by the ideology and agitations of the Situationists. These interests were shared with Jamie Reid, a friend of McLaren who took over the design of the band's visual imagery in the spring of 1976. His cut-up lettering—based on notes left by kidnappers or terrorists—were used to create the classic Sex Pistols logo and many subsequent designs for the band, although they were actually introduced by McLaren's friend Helen Wellington-Lloyd. Reid has said that he used "to talk to John [Lydon] a lot about the Situationists ... the Sex Pistols seemed the perfect vehicle to communicate ideas directly to people who weren't getting the message from left-wing politics". McLaren was also arranging for the band's first photo sessions. According to the writer Jon Savage, Lydon "with his green hair, hunched stance and ragged look ...[Lydon] looked like a cross between Uriah Heep and Richard Hell". (Note: For more on Lydon's apparently coincidental resemblance to Hell, see also Matlock. Also Matlock and Pirroni quotes in Robb, John, Punk Rock.)

Their first gig to attract attention was as a supporting act for Eddie and the Hot Rods, a leading pub rock group, at the Marquee in February 1976. The band's first review appeared in the NME, accompanied by a brief interview in which Jones declared, "Actually we're not into music. We're into chaos." Among those who read the article were two students at the Bolton Institute of Technology, Howard Devoto and Pete Shelley, who headed down to London in search of the Sex Pistols. After chatting with McLaren at Sex, they saw the band at a couple of late February gigs. The two friends immediately began organising their own Pistols-style group, Buzzcocks. As Devoto later put it, "My life changed the moment that I saw the Sex Pistols."

The Pistols soon played other important venues, notably playing at Oxford Street's 100 Club for the first time on 30 March. On 3 April, they played for the first time at the Nashville, supporting the 101ers. The pub rock group's lead singer, Joe Strummer, saw the Pistols for the first time that night—and recognised punk rock as the future. A return gig at the Nashville on 23 April highlighted the band's growing musical competence. However Westwood started a fight with another audience member which also dragged in McLaren and Rotten. Cook later said, the "fight at the Nashville: that's when all the publicity got hold of it and the violence started creeping in ... I think everybody was ready to go and we were the catalyst."

On 11 May, the Pistols began a four-week Tuesday night residency at the 100 Club. They devoted the rest of the month to touring small cities and towns in the north of England and recording demos in London with producer and recording artist Chris Spedding. The following month they played their first gig in Manchester, arranged by Devoto and Shelley. The Sex Pistols' 4 June performance at the Lesser Free Trade Hall set off a punk rock boom in the city.

On 4 and 6 July, respectively, two newly formed London punk rock acts—the Clash, with Strummer as lead vocalist, and the Damned—made their live debuts opening for the Sex Pistols. On their off-night on the 5th, members of all three bands attended the first U.K. gig of the Ramones, the leading New York punk band. While the Ramones are regarded as seminal to the growth of English punk rock, and Cook and Jones were fans of the band, Lydon has repeatedly rejected that they influenced the Sex Pistols, claiming that they "were all long-haired and of no interest to me. I didn't like their image, what they stood for, or anything about them". Cook also denied being influenced by their music, stating, "the Ramones and the Pistols were different animals, with a different flavour. They were more basic, three-chord rock’n’roll", but added that the release of the Ramones debut album made the Pistols think, "We’d better crack on here."

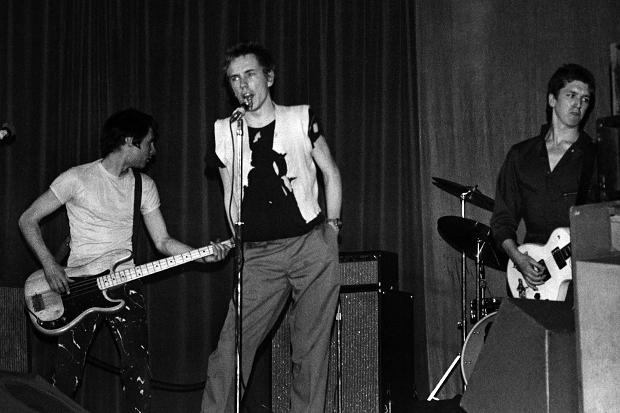
The Sex Pistols performing at Manchester's Lesser Free Trade Hall on 4 June 1976

During a return Manchester gig on 20 July, the Pistols premiered a new song, "Anarchy in the U.K.", reflecting elements of the radical ideologies to which Rotten was being exposed. According to Savage, "there seems little doubt that Lydon was fed material by Vivienne Westwood and Jamie Reid, which he then converted into his own lyric". The lyrics of "Anarchy in the U.K." linked punk to a newly politicised and nihilistic attitude, typified by phrases such as "I am an anti-Christ" and "Destroy!".

"Anarchy in the U.K." was among the seven original songs recorded in a demo session overseen by the band's sound engineer, Dave Goodman. McLaren organised a major event for 29 August at The Screen on the Green in London's Islington district, with the Buzzcocks and the Clash opening for the Pistols. (Note: Quote: Savage, Jon, England's Dreaming) Three days later, the band were in Manchester to tape their first television appearance, for Tony Wilson's So It Goes. The Pistols played their first gig outside Britain on 3 September, at the opening of the Chalet du Lac disco in Paris. The Bromley Contingent were in attendance and Siouxsie was harassed by locals for wearing a cupless bra and a black armband with a swastika on it. The following day, the So It Goes performance aired. On 13 September, the Pistols began a tour of Britain. A week later, back in London, they headlined the opening night of the 100 Club Punk Special. Organised by McLaren (for whom the word "festival" had too much of a hippie connotation), the event was "considered the moment that was the catalyst for the years to come". Belying the common perception that punk bands could not play their instruments, contemporary music press reviews, later critical assessments of concert recordings, and testimonials by fellow musicians indicate that the Pistols had developed into a tight, ferocious live band. As Rotten tested out wild vocalisation styles, the instrumentalists experimented "with overload, feedback and distortion ... pushing their equipment to the limit".

The record label EMI signed the band on a two-year contract on 8 October 1976. The Pistols were soon in a studio recording a full-dress session with Dave Goodman. According to Matlock, "The idea was to get the spirit of the live performance. We were pressurized to make it faster and faster." The results were rejected by the band. Chris Thomas, who had produced Roxy Music and mixed Pink Floyd's The Dark Side of the Moon, was brought in to produce. The band's first single, "Anarchy in the U.K.", was released on 26 November 1976. The single's packaging and visual promotion also broke new ground. Reid and McLaren came up with the idea of selling the record in a completely wordless, featureless black sleeve. The primary image associated with the single was Reid's "anarchy flag" poster: a ripped up and partly safety-pinned back together Union Flag, with the song and band names clipped across the middle. These and other of Reid's images for the band quickly became punk iconography. The musician and journalist John Robb later described the record's impact: "From Steve Jones' opening ... descending chords, to Johnny Rotten's ... sneering vocals, this song is the perfect statement ... a stunningly powerful piece of punk politics." Colin Newman of the early post-punk band Wire, described it as "the clarion call of a generation".

=== Bill Grundy incident and Anarchy Tour ===
"Anarchy in the U.K."
Excerpt from "Anarchy in the UK"

Clip from the 1976 interview with the Pistols and members of the Bromley Contingent conducted by Bill Grundy

The Pistols' behaviour as much as their music attracted national media attention. On 1 December 1976, the band, accompanied by members of the Bromley Contingent, repeatedly swore during an early evening live broadcast of Thames Television's Today programme, hosted by Bill Grundy. Appearing as last-minute replacements for Queen, the band and their entourage were offered drinks as they waited to go on air. During the interview, encouraged by Grundy, Jones said the band had "fucking spent" its label advance, and Rotten used the word "shit". Grundy—who later claimed to have been drunk—then attempted to flirt with Siouxsie Sioux, who replied that she had "always wanted to meet" him. Grundy responded, "Did you really? We'll meet afterwards, shall we?", prompting Jones to repeatedly swear.

Daily Mirror front page, 2 December 1976

Although the programme was only broadcast in the London region, the ensuing media coverage occupied the tabloid newspapers for days. The Daily Mirror famously ran the headline "The Filth and the Fury!", and asked "Who are these punks?"; other papers such as the Daily Express ("Fury at Filthy TV Chat") and the Daily Telegraph ("4-Letter Words Rock TV") followed suit. Thames Television suspended Grundy and the interview effectively ended his career. Steve Jones reflected that Grundy was the big dividing line in the Sex Pistols' story. "Before it, we were all about the music, but from then on it was all about the media. In some ways it was our finest moment, but in others it was the beginning of the end ... In terms of the Sex Pistols having any kind of long-term future, this sudden acceleration was the worst thing that could possibly have happened."

The interview made the band a household name overnight in Britain and brought punk into the mainstream. They launched the UK Anarchy Tour, supported by the Clash and Johnny Thunders' band the Heartbreakers, over from New York. The Damned were briefly part of the tour, before McLaren kicked them off. Media coverage was intense, and many of the concerts were cancelled by organisers or local authorities; of approximately twenty scheduled gigs, only about seven actually took place. Following a campaign in the south Wales press, a crowd including carol singers and a Pentecostal preacher, protested against the group outside a show in Caerphilly. Packers at the EMI plant refused to handle the band's single. London Conservative councillor Bernard Brook-Partridge said, "Most of these groups would be vastly improved by sudden death. The worst of the punk rock groups I suppose currently are the Sex Pistols. They are unbelievably nauseating ... the antithesis of humankind. I would like to see somebody dig a very, very large, exceedingly deep hole and drop the whole bloody lot down it." (Note: The transcription of the television interview has been corrected per the documentary footage used in The Great Rock 'n' Roll Swindle (28:36–28:55))

Three concerts were arranged in the Netherlands for January 1977. The band, hungover, boarded a plane at London Heathrow Airport early on 4 January; a few hours later, the Evening News was reporting that the band had "vomited and spat their way" to the flight. Despite categorical denials by the EMI representative who accompanied the group, the label, which was under political pressure, released the band from their contract. In one journalist's later description, the Pistols had "stoked a moral panic ... precipitating the cancellation of gigs, the band's expulsion from their EMI record deal and lurid tabloid tales of punk's 'shock cult'". As McLaren fielded offers from other labels, the band went into the studio for a round of recordings with Goodman, their last with either him or Matlock.

=== Sid Vicious replaces Matlock ===
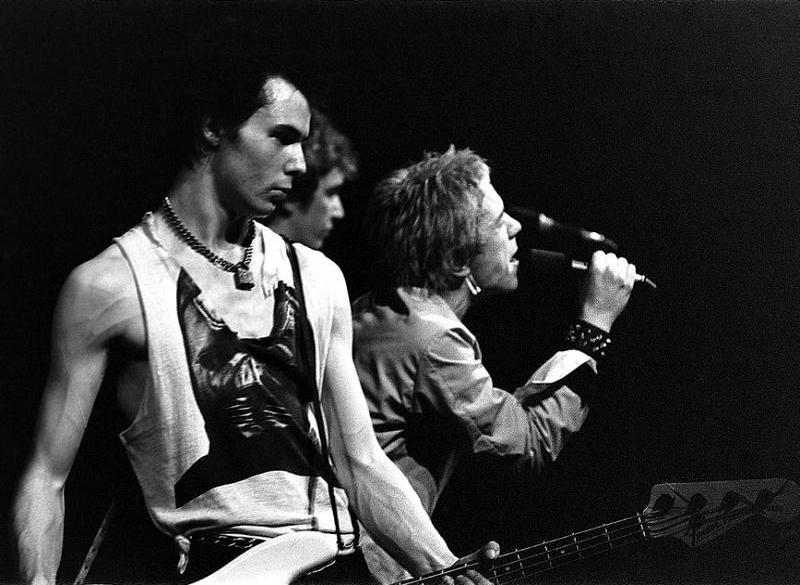
The Sex Pistols (Sid Vicious left, Steve Jones centre, and Johnny Rotten right) performing in Trondheim, Norway, July 1977

On 28 February 1977 McLaren announced Matlock was leaving the band because Matlock "went on too long about Paul McCartney." Although Matlock says he left voluntarily, Jones claimed in a contemporary interview that he was sacked because he "liked the Beatles". In 2005, Jones admitted that although Matlock was a good songwriter, he "didn't look like a Sex Pistol". (Note: See also later Lydon quote: Savage, Jon, England's Dreaming, pp. 307–308.) In 1990, Matlock described the reason as his bitter relationship with Rotten, exacerbated—in Matlock's account—by Rotten's attitude "once he'd had his name in the papers". Jon Savage suggests that Rotten pushed Matlock out to demonstrate his power and autonomy from McLaren.

Matlock was replaced by Rotten's friend John Simon Ritchie, better known by his stage name Sid Vicious. McLaren stated that, much earlier in the band's career, Westwood had recommended Vicious as the Sex Pistols singer, saying he should "get the guy called John who came to the store a couple of times" to be the singer. When Lydon was recruited, Westwood said McLaren had got "the wrong John".

Vicious had previously been the drummer of the Flowers of Romance, and drummed for Siouxsie and the Banshees for their debut show at the 100 Club Punk Special (where he was arrested after hurling a glass that shattered and blinded a girl in one eye). His actions helped contribute to the 100 Club banning punk bands, having also assaulted Nick Kent with a bicycle chain during a previous gig.

According to Matlock, Rotten wanted Vicious in the band because "Instead of him against Steve and Paul, it would become him and Sid against Steve and Paul. He always thought of it in terms of opposing camps." Jones later stated, "to [Paul Cook] and me, it just didn't make any sense to have someone who couldn't play a note trying to fill Glen's shoes, but it was never about the music for McLaren ... from the minute Sid joined the band, nothing was ever normal again." McLaren also acknowledged that Vicious had no background with the instrument, stating, "when Sid joined he couldn't play [bass] but his craziness fitted into the structure of the band."

Lemmy Kilmister, the bassist of Motorhead, had previously attempted to teach Vicious, but said he was "hopeless". According to Chrissie Hynde, after getting recruited into the Sex Pistols, Vicious learned to play by staying up for three nights on speed playing along to the Ramones first album, Still, Lydon described the first rehearsals with him as "hellish".

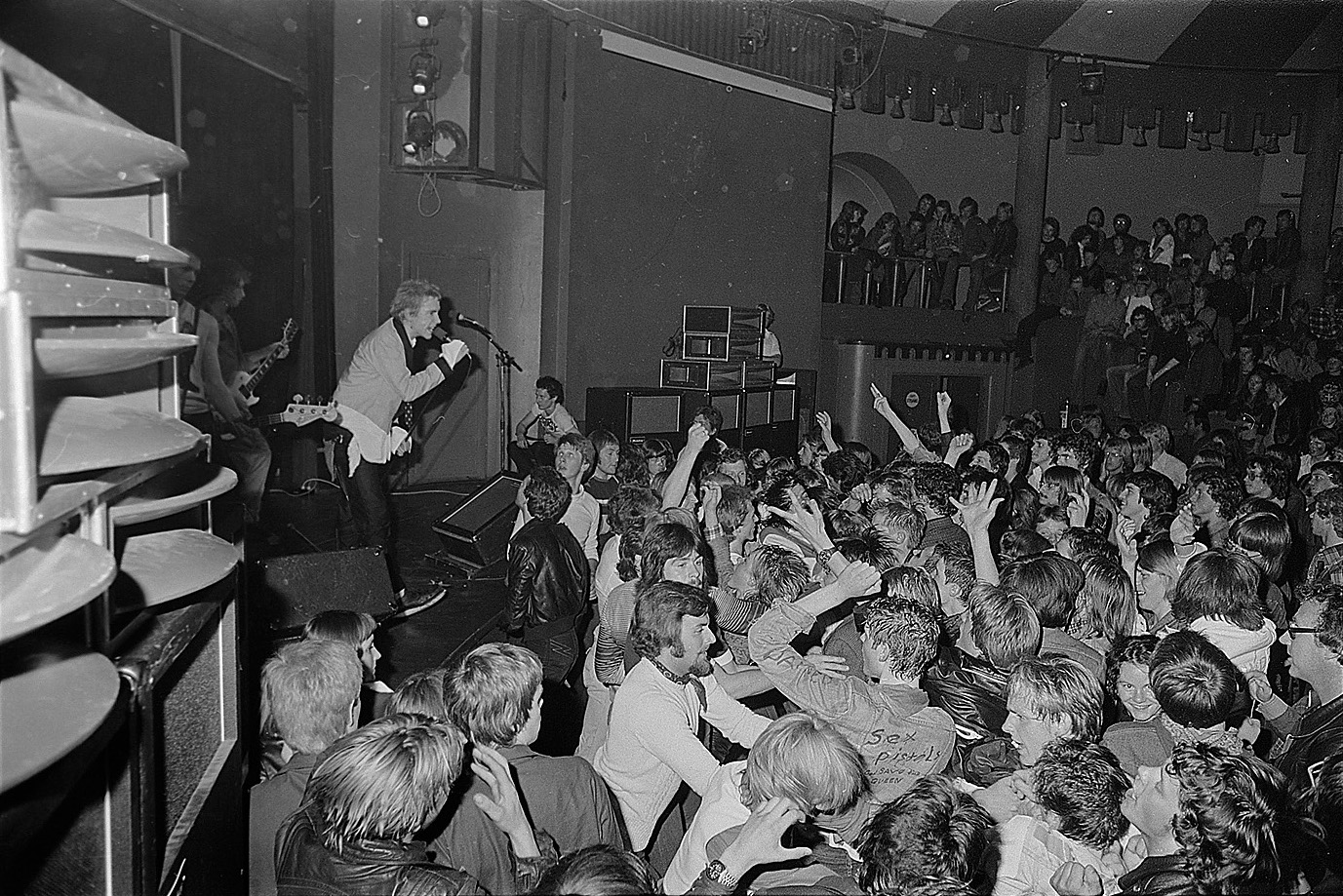
The Sex Pistols performing at the Student Society in Trondheim, 1977

Marco Pirroni, who had performed with Vicious in Siouxsie and the Banshees, said of him joining the Pistols, "After that, it was nothing to do with music anymore. It would just be for the sensationalism and scandal of it all. Then it became the Malcolm McLaren story".

Being in the Pistols had a progressively destructive effect on Vicious. As Lydon observed, "Up to that time, Sid was absolutely childlike. Everything was fun and giggly. Suddenly he was a big pop star. Pop star status meant press, a good chance to be spotted in all the right places, adoration." Early in 1977, he met Nancy Spungen. Spungen introduced Vicious to heroin, and their emotional codependency alienated him from the other band members. Lydon later wrote, "we did everything to get rid of Nancy ... She was killing him. I was absolutely convinced this girl was on a slow suicide mission ... She wanted to take Sid with her."

=== God Save the Queen single ===
The Pistols signed to A&M Records at a March 1977 press ceremony held outside Buckingham Palace. Afterwards, intoxicated, they went to the A&M offices where Vicious reportedly broke a toilet bowl and Rotten verbally abused members of the label's staff. A couple of days later, the Pistols got into a fight with another band at a club; one of Rotten's friends threatened a friend of A&M's English director; A&M broke their contract with the Pistols on 16 March. Although 25,000 copies of the "God Save the Queen" single had already been pressed, nearly all were destroyed.

Jamie Reid's "God Save the Queen" sleeve; in 2001, it was named the greatest record cover of all time by Q magazine.

Vicious first performed with the Pistols at London's Notre Dame Hall on 28 March. That May, the Pistols signed with Virgin Records, their third label in little more than half a year. During Virgin's release campaign for "God Save the Queen", workers at the pressing plant laid down tools in protest at the song's lyrics and Reid's cover art of Queen Elizabeth II with her face obscured by cutout letters forming the song title and the band name. The single was eventually released on 27 May. Its lyrics–"God save the queen / the fascist regime..She ain't no human being / and there's no future / in England's dreaming"–lead to widespread outcry from the British tabloids, leading to several major chains withdrawing it from sale. It was banned by BBC radio and television and every independent radio station, making it, according to the music critic Alexis Petridis, the "most heavily censored record in British history". The song's social impact has been described by the musician and journalist Sean O'Hagan as "punk's crowning glory".

The single was timed to coincide with the height of Queen Elizabeth's Silver Jubilee celebrations. By Jubilee weekend, a week and a half after the record's release, it had sold more than 150,000 copies. On 7 June, McLaren chartered a boat to have the Sex Pistols perform while sailing the River Thames, passing Westminster Pier and the Houses of Parliament. The event was conceived as a mockery of the Queen's river procession planned for two days later, but ended in chaos. Police launches forced the boat to dock, and constabulary surrounded the gangplanks at the pier. While the band members and their equipment were hustled down a side stairwell, McLaren, Westwood, and many of the band's entourage were arrested.

"God Save the Queen"
"God Save the Queen" was originally titled "No Future", but was changed to coincide with the 1977 Jubilee

"God Save the Queen" opened at number 2 on the official UK record chart for Jubilee week, behind Rod Stewart's "I Don't Want to Talk About It". McLaren claimed that CBS Records, who distributed both singles, told him that the Pistols were outselling Stewart two to one. There is evidence that exceptional measures were taken by the British Phonographic Institute, which oversaw the compilation of the UK chart, to exclude sales from Virgin's shops.

Attacks on punk fans rose and in mid-June, Rotten was assaulted by a knife-wielding gang outside Islington's Pegasus pub, causing tendon damage to his left arm. Reid and Cook were beaten up in other incidents; three days after the Pegasus assault, Rotten was attacked again. According to Cook, after the "God Save the Queen" single and the Grundy incident, the Pistols were public enemy number one, and there was a rivalry between gangs of rockabillies, Teddy Boys and punks, which often led to violence. By that August the band were unable to publicise UK dates, forcing them to tour pseudonymously as the SPOTS (Sex Pistols on Tour Secretly) to avoid cancellation.

=== Never Mind the Bollocks ===
Jamie Reid's logo for Never Mind the Bollocks

Beginning in early 1977, Lydon, Jones and Cook began to record tracks for their debut album with producer Chris Thomas. Initially titled God Save Sex Pistols, it became known during the summer as Never Mind the Bollocks. Vicious's lack of musical ability became apparent soon after he joined the sessions; according to Jones they "tried as hard as possible not to let [Vicious] anywhere near the studio". Although Matlock was asked to return as a session musician, Jones ultimately played most of the bass parts. Vicious's bass is reportedly present on "Bodies": According to Jones, "we just let him do it. When he left I dubbed another part on, leaving Sid's down low." Jones says that Vicious showed up for the "God Save the Queen" session, while Lydon remembers him being there during the recording of an unused version of "Submission". Two further singles were released from the Thomas sessions; "Pretty Vacant" on 1 July and "Holidays in the Sun" on 14 October. Each was a top-ten hit.

The album was released on 28 October 1977. Rolling Stone described it as "the most exciting rock & roll record of the Seventies". Some critics were disappointed that the album contained all four previously released singles, and dismissed it as little more than a "greatest hits" compilation.

Containing the track "Bodies"—in which Rotten says "fuck" six times—and "God Save the Queen", and featuring the word bollocks in its title, the album was banned by Boots, WHSmith and Woolworths. The Conservative shadow minister for education condemned it as "a symptom of the way society is declining", and both the Independent Television Companies Association and Association of Independent Radio Contractors banned its advertisements. Nonetheless, advance sales were sufficient to make it number one on the album chart.

The album title led to a high-profile legal case after a Nottingham Virgin Records store was threatened with prosecution for displaying "indecent printed matter". The case was thrown out when defending QC John Mortimer produced an expert witness who established that bollocks was an Old English term for a small ball, that the word appeared in place names without causing local communities erotic disturbance, and that in the nineteenth century bollocks had been used as a nickname for clergymen: "Clergymen are known to talk a good deal of rubbish and so the word later developed the meaning of nonsense." In the context of the album title, the term does in fact primarily signify "nonsense". Steve Jones off-handedly came up with the title as the band debated what to call the album. An exasperated Jones said, "Oh, fuck it, never mind the bollocks of it all."

After dates in the Netherlands, the band set out on a Never Mind the Bans tour of Britain in December 1977. Of eight scheduled dates, four were cancelled due to illness or political pressure. On Christmas Day, the Pistols played two shows at Ivanhoe's in Huddersfield, the first show being for the children of striking firemen. These were the band's final UK performances for more than eighteen years.

The Pistols January 1978 US tour was initially scheduled for nine dates, but due to Vicious's drug use and the breakdown in the relationship between Lydon and McLaren was cut short after seven shows. It was delayed due to American authorities' reluctance to issue a visa to Jones, given his criminal record, leading to the cancellation of several dates in the Northeast. Although the tour had been highly anticipated in the US, it was plagued by in-fighting and poor planning, leading to frustrated and belligerent audiences.

Early in the tour, Vicious was arrested while trying to buy heroin in Memphis and beaten by the security team hired by Warner Bros., the band's American label. He subsequently appeared with the words "Gimme a fix" scarred on his chest. During a concert in San Antonio, Vicious had a back and forth verbal altercation with a man in the crowd, Vicious shouted "You faggot little fucker" before swinging his bass guitar into the crowd and having the man kicked out of the concert. Suffering from heroin withdrawal during a show in Dallas, he spat blood at a woman who climbed onstage and punched him in the face. He was admitted to hospital later that night to treat various injuries. Offstage he is said to have kicked a photographer, attacked a security guard, and challenged one of his own bodyguards to a fight.

"No Fun"
Sample of "No Fun", a cover version of the Stooges song—studio recording from 1976 or 1977

Rotten was suffering flu and coughing up blood, and he felt increasingly isolated from Cook and Jones and disgusted by Vicious. Jones later said that he and Cook "couldn't stand being around Johnny and Sid anymore. You couldn't turn round for a minute without Sid starting a fight ... Then on top of that you had Rotten, who was on his own trip and basically thought he was God by that stage."

On 14 January 1978, during the tour's final date at the Winterland Ballroom in San Francisco, a disillusioned Rotten introduced the band's encore saying, "You'll get one number and one number only 'cause I'm a lazy bastard." That one number was a Stooges cover, "No Fun". At the end of the song, Rotten, kneeling on the stage, chanted an unambiguous declaration, "This is no fun. No fun. This is no fun—at all. No fun." As the final cymbal crash died away, Rotten addressed the audience directly—"Ah-ha-ha. Ever get the feeling you've been cheated? Good night"—before throwing down his microphone and walking offstage. (Note: The transcription has been slightly expanded per the documentary footage used in The Great Rock 'n' Roll Swindle (1:09:55–1:10:31). The sound cuts out immediately after the word "cheated".) He later observed, "I felt cheated, and I wasn't going on with it any longer; it was a ridiculous farce. Sid was completely out of his brains—just a waste of space. The whole thing was a joke at that point ... [Malcolm] wouldn't speak to me ... He would not discuss anything with me. But then he would turn around and tell Paul and Steve that the tension was all my fault because I wouldn't agree to anything."

On 17 January the band travelled separately to Los Angeles. Vicious, in increasingly bad shape, was brought by a friend who then took him to New York; Vicious took a mixture of valium and methadone (later excused as "nervous exhaustion") and was hospitalised on arrival. Rotten flew to New York to visit Vicious, and announced the band's break-up on 18 January. Virtually broke, he telephoned the head of Virgin Records, Richard Branson, who agreed to pay for his flight back to London.

=== The Great Rock 'n' Roll Swindle and Vicious' death ===
After leaving the Pistols, Rotten reverted to his birth name of Lydon and formed the influential post-punk band Public Image Ltd. Cook, Jones and Vicious did not play live together again after his departure, but over the next several months, McLaren arranged for recordings in Brazil (with Jones and Cook), Paris (with Vicious) and London; they and others stepped in as lead vocalists on tracks. On 30 June, a single was released: on one side, notorious criminal Ronnie Biggs sang "No One Is Innocent" accompanied by Jones and Cook; on the other, Vicious sang the classic "My Way", over both a Jones–Cook backing track and a string orchestra. (Note: Gimarc refers to sources claiming that the "My Way" recording involved no contact between Vicious and the Jones-Cook duo; Temple, however, says that Jones was flown over to Paris to join Vicious in the studio, and seems to indicate that he recorded his guitar part there (1:33:09–1:33:16).) The single charted at number seven.

McLaren had long wanted to make a movie featuring the Sex Pistols. He had previously worked with director Julien Temple to assemble Sex Pistols Number 1, a 25-minute mosaic of footage from various sources, much of it refilmed from television screens. Number 1 was often screened at concert venues before the band took stage. Using media footage from the Thames incident, Temple created another short, Jubilee Riverboat (aka Sex Pistols Number 2). The Great Rock 'n' Roll Swindle, a soundtrack album for Temple's then-uncompleted full-length film about the Sex Pistols, would feature songs from the Brazil, Paris, and London recordings. The album was released by Virgin Records in February 1979, and consisted of new tracks sung by Jones, Vicious, Cook, Biggs, McLaren and Edward Tudor-Pole. Several tracks feature Rotten's vocals from early unissued sessions, in some cases with re-recorded music by Jones and Cook. There is one live cut, from the band's final concert in San Francisco. The album also contains tracks in which other artists cover Sex Pistols songs. (Note: Savage says there are six Rotten vocals (p. 558); in fact, the various releases of the album all include seven or eight.) Four songs from Swindle became top ten singles, one more than from Never Mind the Bollocks. The 1978 "No One Is Innocent"/"My Way" single was followed in 1979 by the Vicious-sung cover of Eddie Cochran's "Something Else" (number three, and the biggest-selling single under the Sex Pistols name); Jones singing an original, "Silly Thing" (number six); and Vicious's second Cochran cover, "C'mon Everybody" (number three). Two more singles from the soundtrack were put out under the Sex Pistols name, with Tudor-Pole and others singing "The Great Rock 'n' Roll Swindle", and "(I'm Not Your) Steppin' Stone", which featured a Rotten vocal from 1976; both fell just shy of the Top Twenty.

Two Cook and Jones tracks left off the album, "Black Leather" and "Here We Go Again", appeared on the Japanese compilation The Very Best Of Sex Pistols And We Don't Care in December 1979,

Just prior to the album's release, Vicious died of a heroin overdose, aged 21. In 1978 he had moved to New York, where he attempted to launch a career as a solo artist with Spungen as his manager, and backed by members of the New York Dolls, recorded songs released on his posthumous 1979 live album Sid Sings. On 12 October 1978, Spungen was found dead aged 20 in the Hotel Chelsea room she was sharing with Vicious, from a stab wound to her stomach. Police recovered drug paraphernalia from the scene and Vicious was arrested and charged with her murder. While on bail, Vicious was arrested for smashing a beer mug in the face of Patti Smith's brother Todd Smith. Vicious was taken into custody on 9 December 1978 and spent the next 54 days in Rikers Island jail, where he underwent enforced cold turkey detox. He was released on bail on 1 February 1979. Later that night, following a small party to celebrate his release, he died of a heroin overdose.

=== Initial breakup and aftermath ===
Lydon initiated legal proceedings against McLaren and the Pistols' management company, Glitterbest, which McLaren controlled. Among the claims were non-payment of royalties, improper usage of the title "Johnny Rotten", unfair contractual obligations and damages for "all the criminal activities that took place". Hearings began on 7 February 1979, five days after Vicious's death. Cook and Jones allied with McLaren, but as evidence mounted that their manager had spent virtually all of the band's revenue on his film project, they switched sides. On 14 February, the court put the film and its soundtrack into receivership—no longer under McLaren's control, they were now to be administered as exploitable assets for addressing the band members' financial claims. McLaren was left with substantial personal debts and legal fees. McLaren went on to carry out a one-month consultancy for Adam and the Ants and manage their offshoot Bow Wow Wow. In the mid-1980s he released a series of successful and influential records as a solo artist.

Following their fall out with McLaren, Cook and Jones looked to work with new musicians. Simon Draper, the Managing Director of Virgin Records told Melody Maker, "Whoever joins Cook and Jones will be part of the Sex Pistols", however they started a project with Sham 69 singer Jimmy Pursey, which became known as the Sham Pistols. Following this, Cook and Jones formed the Professionals, which lasted from 1979-1982.

The Great Rock 'n' Roll Swindle film was eventually completed by Julien Temple, who received sole credit for the script after McLaren had his name taken off the production. Released in 1980, it heavily reflects McLaren's vision. It is a fictionalised and partially animated retelling of the band's history and aftermath with McLaren in the lead role, Jones as second lead, and contributions from Vicious (including his memorable performance of "My Way") and Cook. It incorporates promotional videos shot for "God Save the Queen" and "Pretty Vacant" and extensive documentary footage as well, much of it focusing on Rotten. In Temple's description, he and McLaren conceived it as a "very stylized ... polemic". They were reacting to the fact that the Pistols had become the "poster on the bedroom wall of the day where you kneel down last thing at night and pray to your rock god. And that was never the point ... The myth had to be dynamited in some way. We had to make this film in a way to enrage the fans." In the film, McLaren claims to have created the band from scratch and engineered its notorious reputation; much of what structure the loose narrative has is based on McLaren's teaching a series of "lessons" to be learned from "an invention of mine they called the punk rock".

The 1979 court ruling left many issues between Lydon and McLaren unresolved. Five years later, Lydon filed another action. Finally, on 16 January 1986, Lydon, Jones, Cook and the estate of Sid Vicious were awarded control of the band's heritage, including the rights to The Great Rock 'n' Roll Swindle and all the footage shot for it—more than 250 hours. That same year, the fictionalised film of Vicious's relationship with Spungen was released: Sid and Nancy, directed by Alex Cox. In his autobiography, Lydon attacked the film, saying that it "celebrates heroin addiction", goes out of its way to "humiliate [Vicious's] life" and completely misrepresents the Sex Pistols' part in the London punk scene. Access to the archives associated with The Great Rock 'n' Roll Swindle facilitated the production of the 2000 documentary The Filth and the Fury. The film was also directed by Temple and formulated as an attempt to tell the story from the band's point of view, in contrast to Swindle's focus on McLaren and the media.

In May 2022 FX released the miniseries Pistol about the band, based on Jones' 2017 memoir Lonely Boy: Tales from a Sex Pistol. While the series was still in production, Lydon criticised the series, branding it as "The most disrespectful shit I've ever had to endure". Jones and Cook sued Lydon to allow Sex Pistols music to be used in the series despite his objections. They said they had the support of Glen Matlock as well as the estate of Sid Vicious, and cited a 1998 agreement that allowed a majority decision among band members. Lydon lost the legal battle in August 2021.

=== Reunions ===
The original band members reunited in 1996 for the six-month Filthy Lucre tour, which included dates in Europe, North and South America, Australia and Japan. In 2002 the band reunited to play the Crystal Palace National Sports Centre in London. They undertook a short tour of North America in 2003.

In March 2006, the band sold the rights to their back catalogue to Universal Music Group. In November 2006, the Sex Pistols were inducted to the Rock and Roll Hall of Fame, but the band rejected the honour. According to Jones, "once you want to be put into a museum, Rock & Roll's over; it's not voted by fans, it's voted by people who induct you ... people who are already in it."

The Sex Pistols reunited for seven performances in the UK in November 2007. In 2008, they undertook a series of European festival appearances, titled the Combine Harvester Tour. That same year, they released the DVD There'll Always Be An England, recorded at their Brixton Academy appearance on 10 November 2007. The band signed with Universal in 2012 to re-release Never Mind the Bollocks, Here's the Sex Pistols.

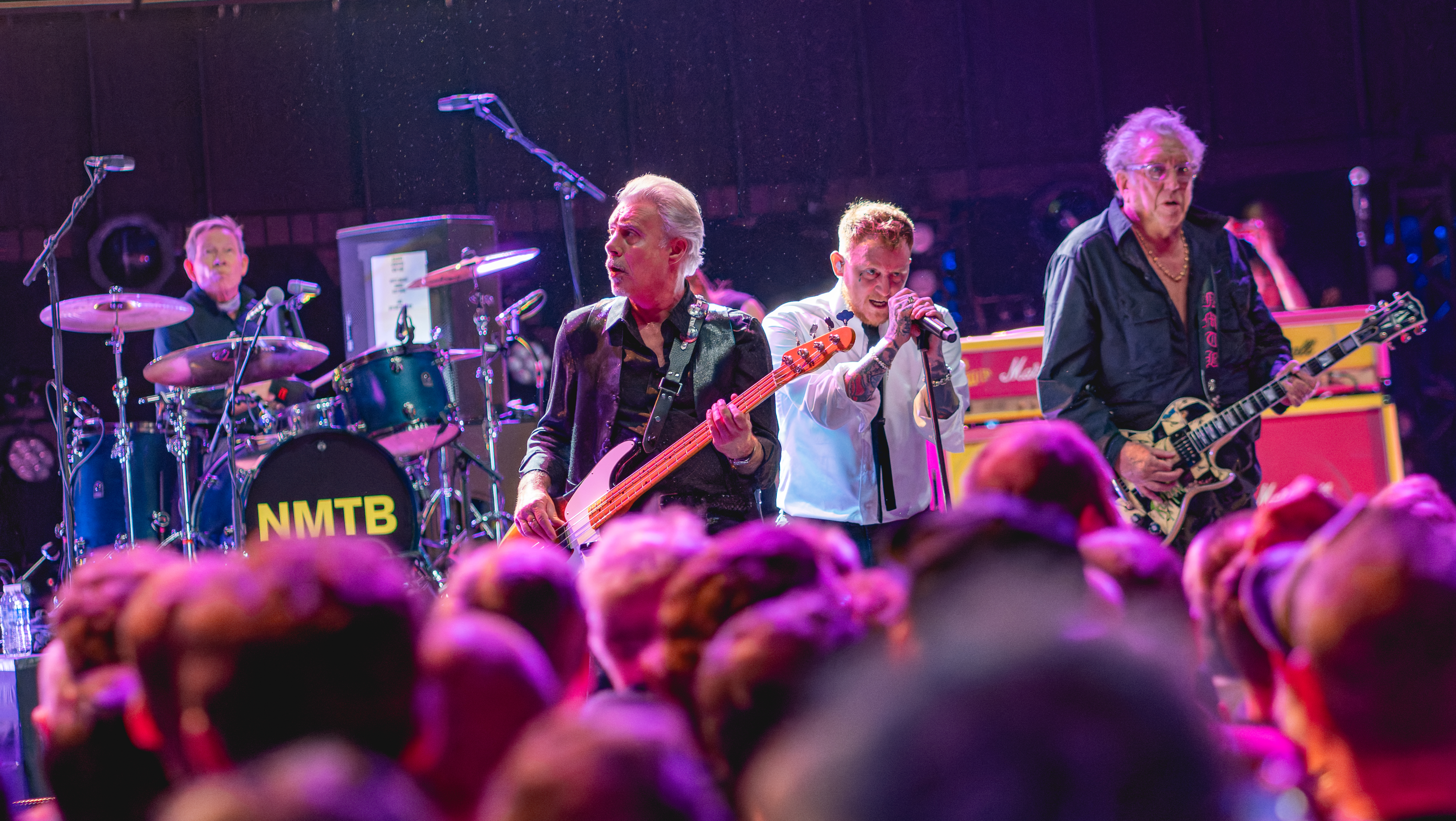
The Sex Pistols and Frank Carter performing at the Royal Albert Hall in 2025

On 3 June 2024, Cook, Jones, and Matlock announced two reunion shows at the Bush Hall in Shepherds Bush billed as "Frank Carter and Sex Pistols". Carter, of Frank Carter & The Rattlesnakes and Gallows, provided lead vocals in the absence of Lydon. They played the sole Sex Pistols studio album Never Mind the Bollocks, Here's the Sex Pistols in its entirety. Lydon himself has spoken out against his former bandmates, branding the reunion as "karaoke" and "almost malicious in its intent". On 25 August they headlined, along with Editors, the 2024 AMA Music Festival. A UK tour was later announced for September 2024, which was officially billed as "Frank Carter and Paul Cook, Steve Jones, Glen Matlock of the Sex Pistols do Never Mind the Bollocks". On 20 September they played the Rock City venue in Nottingham, the next day the Birmingham o2 Academy and on 26 September they played in London, Kentish Town. On 12 November 2024, they were announced as part of the 2025 Download Festival lineup. In January 2025, they announced their first Australian tour since 1996, which took place in April. The reunion is set to continue into 2026, beginning with a run of european summer festivals, followed by a North American and UK arena tour running from September to December. In October 2025, Matlock revealed that the band have had "ideas" regarding new music with Carter, but were apprehensive about the reception that new music would receive among contemporary audiences. Carter also stated in 2026 that he had written some ideas for Sex Pistols songs and expressed a willingness to record, but understood the pressure the band would be under to follow Never Mind the Bollocks.

== Musical style ==
The Sex Pistols were a punk rock band. According to Mark Deming of AllMusic,

"The Sex Pistols' music was not formally groundbreaking, yet their simple meat-and-potatoes rock was filled with a power and aggression that was all but unknown in the mid-'70s, and the ferocious, sneering vocals of Johnny Rotten (as well as his pointed, accusatory lyrics) upended all expectations of how a rock frontman should look or sound. Even as the media treated them as pariahs, the potency of their music and their image spoke to an audience waiting for something different than the prog and soft rock sounds that ruled the charts in the 1970s, sparking a revolution that is still playing itself out."

== Legacy ==
=== Influence ===
The Sex Pistols are widely regarded as one of the most influential acts in popular music history. Their Trouser Press Record Guide entry claims that "their importance—both to the direction of contemporary music and more generally to pop culture—can hardly be overstated". The music critic Dave Marsh called them "unquestionably the most radical new rock band of the Seventies". Although not the first punk band, Never Mind the Bollocks is regularly cited as one of the all-time great albums: in 2006, it was voted No. 28 in Q magazine's "100 Greatest Albums Ever", while Rolling Stone listed it at No. 2 in its 1987 "Top 100 Albums of the Last 20 Years". It has come to be recognised as among the most influential records in rock history. According to AllMusic, the album is "one of the greatest, most inspiring rock records of all time".

They directly inspired the style of many punk and post-punk bands, including the Clash, Siouxsie and the Banshees, the Adverts, Subway Sect and the Slits. Their 4 June and 20 July 1976 performances at Manchester's Lesser Free Trade Hall became one of the most mythologised events in rock history. Many among the audience of about forty became leading figures in the punk and post-punk movements, including Pete Shelley and Howard Devoto, who organised the gig, Bernard Sumner, Ian Curtis, Peter Hook, Mark E. Smith, John Cooper Clarke, Morrissey and Anthony H. Wilson. Among the many later musicians who have acknowledged their debt to the Pistols are members of the Jesus and Mary Chain, the Stone Roses, Guns N' Roses, Nirvana, Green Day and Oasis. Calling the band "immensely influential", a London College of Music study notes that "many styles of popular music, such as grunge, indie, thrash metal and even rap owe their foundations to the legacy of ground breaking punk bands—of which the Sex Pistols was the most prominent."

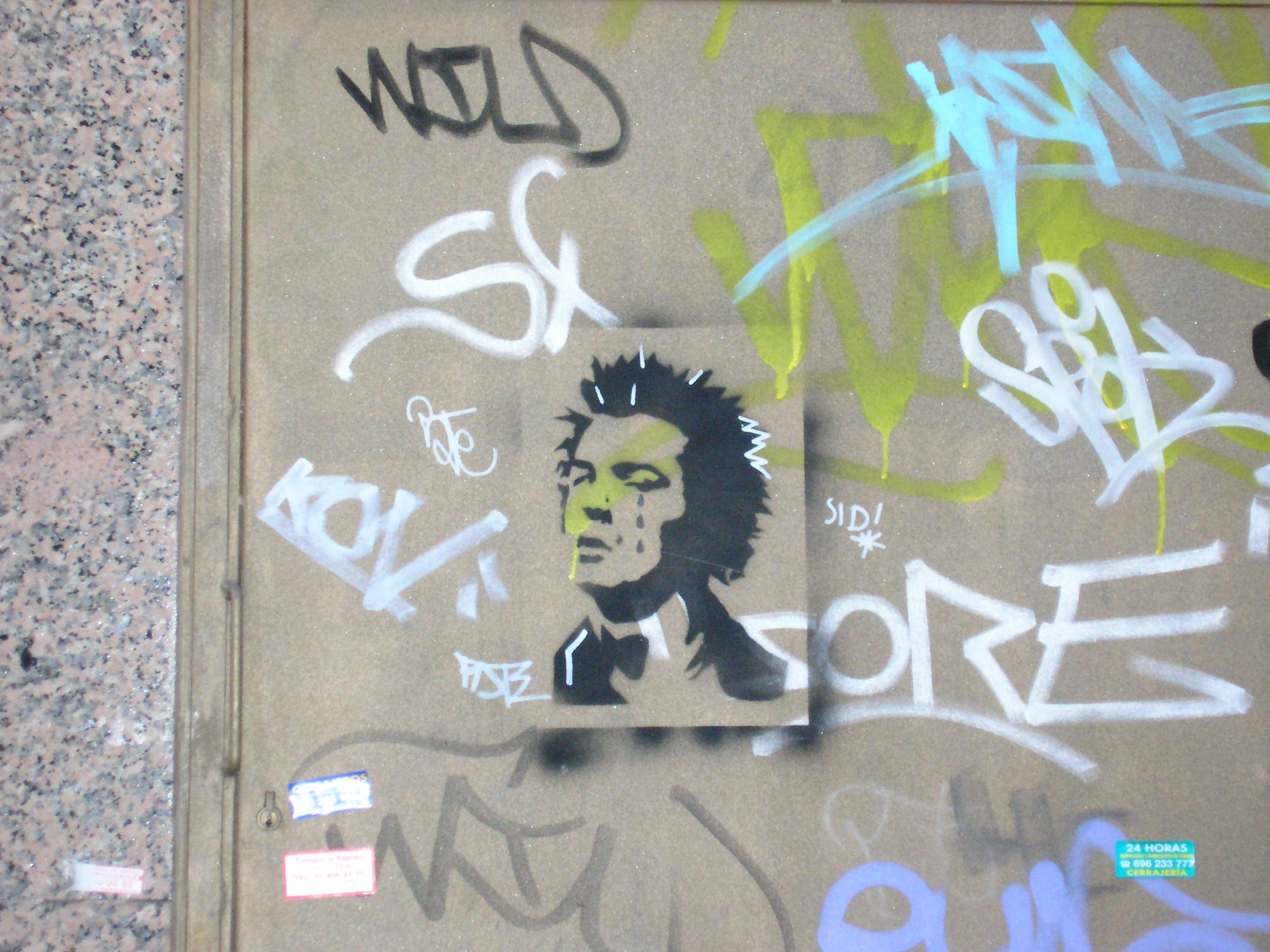
Graffiti of Vicious in Madrid, 2006

According to the music journalist Ira Robbins, "the Pistols and ... McLaren challenged every aspect and precept of modern music-making, thereby inspiring countless groups to follow their cue onto stages around the world." Critic Toby Creswell locates the primary source of inspiration somewhat differently. Noting that "[i]mage to the contrary, the Pistols were very serious about music", Creswell wrote that "essentially, the Sex Pistols reinforced what the garage bands of the '60s had demonstrated—you don't need technique to make rock & roll. In a time when music had been increasingly complicated and defanged, the Sex Pistols' generational shift caused a real revolution."

Their cultural influence is evident in other media. Reid's work for the band is regarded as among the most important graphic design of the 1970s and still influences the field in the 21st century. Aged twenty-one, Vicious was already a "t-shirt-selling icon". While the manner of his death signified for many the inevitable failure of punk's social ambitions, it cemented his image as an archetype of doomed youth. British punk fashion, still widely influential, is now customarily credited to Westwood and McLaren; as Johnny Rotten, Lydon had a lasting effect as well, especially through his bricolage approach to personal style: he would wear a ted style velvet collared drape jacket, large pin-stripe pegs, a pin-collar Wemblex customised into an Anarchy shirt and brothel creepers. Christopher Nolan, director of the Batman movie The Dark Knight, has said that Rotten inspired his characterisation of The Joker.

=== Conceptual basis ===
The Sex Pistols were defined by ambitions that went beyond the musical—indeed, McLaren was at times openly contemptuous of the band's music and punk rock generally. "Christ, if people bought the records for the music, this thing would have died a death long ago", he said in 1977. He claimed that the Sex Pistols were his personal, Situationist-style art project: "I decided to use people, just the way a sculptor uses clay." According to McLaren, they were something with which "to sell trousers" and a "carefully planned exercise to embezzle as much money as possible out of the music industry". Jon Savage characterises McLaren's core theme in The Great Rock 'n' Roll Swindle as an attempt to extract "cash from chaos". (Note: The line, which became known as a catchphrase of McLaren's, appears in the lyric of the title track (credited to Jones, Cook and Temple) (6:59–7:02); as a motto on a conveniently placed coat of arms (21:30–21:36); and in large letters on a T-shirt won by McLaren in several scenes (first fully visible: 26:26–26:51; partly visible in three subsequent scenes). See also Temple's script for the film's promotional video.)

Lydon dismissed McLaren's influence: "We made our own scandal just by being ourselves. Maybe it was that he knew he was redundant, so he overcompensated. All the talk about the French Situationists being associated with punk is bollocks. It's nonsense!" Cook agreed and said that "Situationism had nothing to do with us. The Jamie Reids and Malcolms were excited because we were the real thing. I suppose we were what they were dreaming of." According to Lydon, "If we had an aim, it was to force our own, working-class opinions into the mainstream, which was unheard of in pop music at the time."

Toby Creswell argues that the Pistols' message was "inchoate, to say the least. It was a general call to rebellion that falls apart at the slightest scrutiny." Critic Ian Birch, writing in 1981, called "stupid" the claim that the Sex Pistols "had any political significance ... If they did anything, they made a lot of people content with being nothing. They certainly didn't inspire the working classes." While the Conservative triumph in 1979 may be taken as evidence for that position, Julien Temple has noted that the scene inspired by the Sex Pistols "wasn't your kind of two-up, two-down working class normal families, most of it. It was over the edge of the precipice in social terms. They were actually giving a voice to an area of the working class that was almost beyond the pale." Within a year of "Anarchy in the U.K.", that voice was being echoed widely: scores if not hundreds of punk bands had formed across the country—groups composed largely of working-class members or middle-class members who rejected their own class values and pursued solidarity with the working class.

In 1980, critic Greil Marcus reflected on McLaren's contradictory posture:

It may be that in the mind of their self-celebrated Svengali ... the Sex Pistols were never meant to be more than a nine-month wonder, a cheap vehicle for some fast money, a few laughs, a touch of the old épater la bourgeoisie. It may also be that in the mind of their chief terrorist and propagandist, anarchist veteran ... and Situational artist McLaren, the Sex Pistols were meant to be a force that would set the world on its ear ... and finally unite music and politics. The Sex Pistols were all of these things.

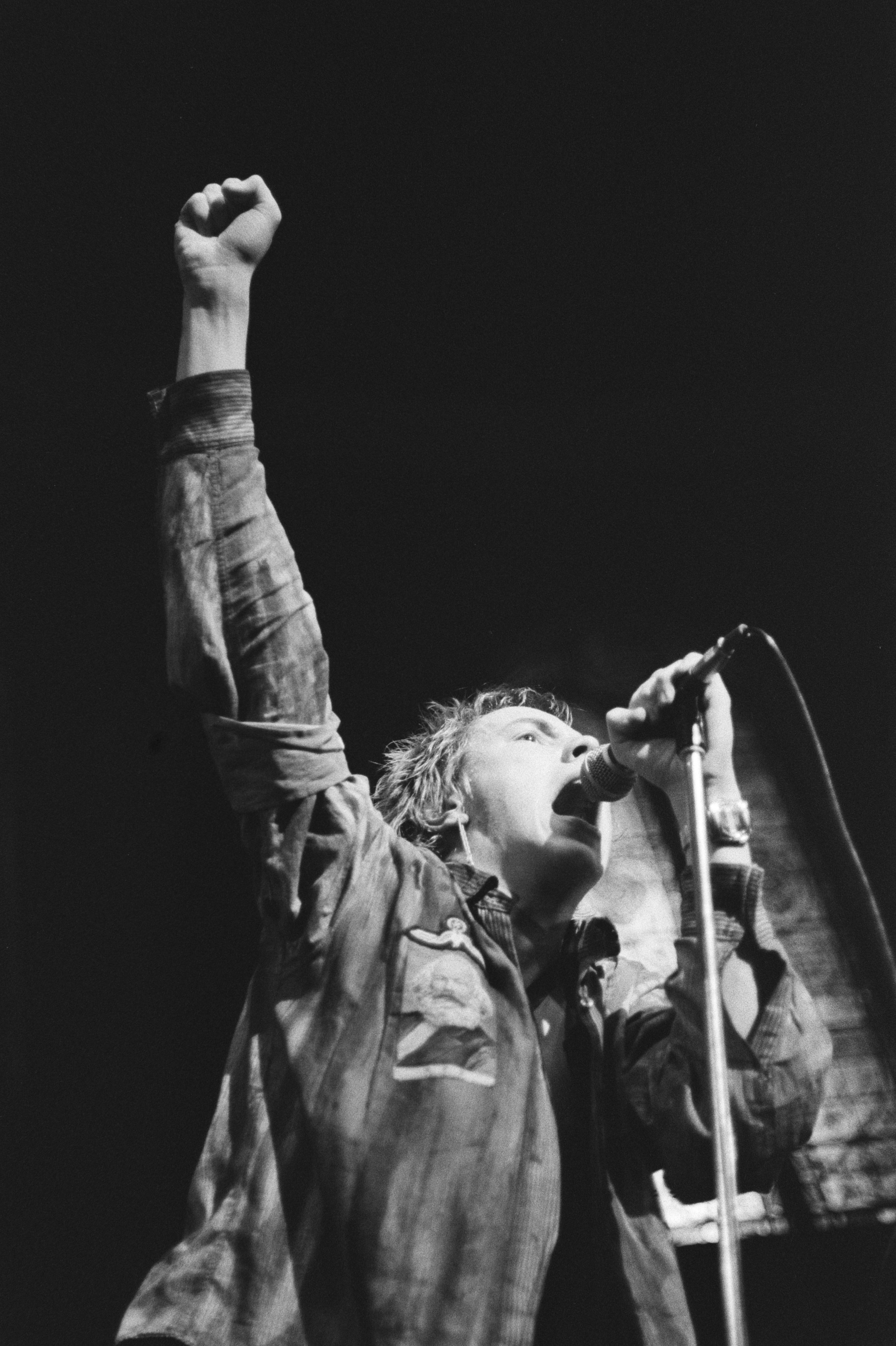
Johnny Rotten on stage in Paradiso, Amsterdam, January 1977

Critic Bill Wyman writes that Lydon's "fierce intelligence and astonishing onstage charisma" were important catalysts, but ultimately finds the band's real meaning lies in McLaren's provocative media manipulations. While some of the Sex Pistols' public affronts were plotted by McLaren, Westwood, and company, others were evidently not—including what McLaren himself cites as the "pivotal moment that changed everything", the clash on the Bill Grundy Today show. (Note: See, for instance, Temple's commentary: "[It] was not planned at all. It was totally spontaneous. And as the band will tell you, Malcolm said, 'You've blown it. You've ruined everything I've worked for'" (Temple, Julien, "Commentary", 27:26–27:33); and Matlock's confirmation (Matlock, Glen, I Was a Teenage Sex Pistol, pp. 145, 147)) According to Cook, McLaren "didn't instigate [situations]; that was always our own doing." Matlock said that at the point when he left the band, it was clear to him that McLaren "was in fact quite deliberately perpetrating that idea of us as his puppets ... However, I've since found out that even Malcolm wasn't as aware of what he was up to as he has since made out." By his absence, Matlock demonstrated how crucial he was to the band's creativity: the band only wrote two songs in the eleven months between his departure and their break-up.

== Band members ==
=== Current members ===
Image	Name	Years active	Instruments	Releases
	Steve Jones	1975–1978; 1996; 2002–2003; 2007–2008; 2024–present	guitar; backing vocals; bass (1977); lead vocals (1975, 1978)	All releases
	Paul Cook	1975–1978; 1996; 2002–2003; 2007–2008; 2024–present	drums; occasional vocals	All releases
	Glen Matlock	1975–1977; 1996; 2002–2003; 2007–2008; 2024–present	bass; backing vocals	Singles: from "Anarchy in the U.K./"I Wanna Be Me" (1976) to "Pretty Vacant"/"No Fun" (1977) and "Pretty Vacant Live" (1996) Live albums: All live albums apart from Live at Winterland 1978 (2001)

=== Current touring musicians ===
Image	Name	Years active	Instruments	Releases
	Frank Carter	2024–present	lead vocals	none

=== Former members ===
Image	Name	Years active	Instruments	Releases
	Johnny Rotten	1975–1978; 1996; 2002–2003; 2007–2008	lead vocals	Singles: from "Anarchy in the U.K./"I Wanna Be Me" (1976) to "Holidays in the Sun"/"Satellite" (1977) and "Pretty Vacant Live" (1996) Studio albums: Never Mind the Bollocks, Here's the Sex Pistols (1977) Live albums: All live albums
	Wally Nightingale	1975 (died 1996)	guitar	none
	Nick Kent	1975	guitar	none
	Stella Nova (Steve New)	1975 (died 2010)	guitar	none
	Sid Vicious	1977–1978 (died 1979)	bass; backing and lead vocals	Singles: "No One Is Innocent"/"My Way" (1978) Studio albums: Never Mind the Bollocks, Here's the Sex Pistols (1977) Live albums: Live at Winterland 1978 (2001), Raw and Live (2004, disc 2 only),

== Discography ==
=== Studio album ===
- Never Mind the Bollocks, Here's the Sex Pistols (1977)
