= The Professionals (band) =

English punk rock band

Background information
- Origin: London, England
- Genres: Punk rock
- Years active: 1979–1982 · 2015–2024
- Spinoff of: Sex Pistols, Subway Sect, Lightning Raiders, Chequered Past, Chiefs of Relief, Wild Crash 500, Fantasy 7, Hank Dogs, Neurotic Outsiders, Zilch, The Fallen Leaves, Man Raze, Diane Lane
- Past members: Paul Cook; Tom Spencer; Dean Croney; Marc Hayward; Chris McCormack; Toshi JC Ogawa; Steve Jones; Andy Allan; Ray McVeigh; Paul Myers
- Website: Official website

The Professionals were an English punk rock band active from 1979 to early 1982 and again from 2015 to 2024. They were formed by ex-Sex Pistols members Steve Jones and Paul Cook after that band's demise. The Professionals split in 1982, before reforming in 2015 under the leadership of Cook.

== Biography ==
=== 1979–1980: Formation and recording of debut album ===
The Professionals were formed in 1979 by guitarist Steve Jones and drummer Paul Cook, both formerly of the Sex Pistols. In the previous year, Johnny Rotten had left the Sex Pistols, and both Cook and Jones had sung lead for the late Sex Pistols recordings "Silly Thing" and "Lonely Boy". For these recordings, Lightning Raiders bassist Andy Allan was employed as a session musician. After the Sex Pistols officially split and broke ties with manager Malcolm McLaren, the line-up of Cook, Jones and Allan formed the Professionals and signed with Virgin Records, the same label as the Sex Pistols. The band were first managed by Dave Hill, who had managed Johnny Thunders and was managing the Pretenders.

In July 1980, the Professionals released their first single, "Just Another Dream", which also included a video promo. The release was followed by a second single "1-2-3" in October, which reached No. 43 in the UK Singles Charts. Shortly after the second single's release, Cook and Jones had plans to release the band's debut self-titled album that same year. However, legal problems followed as Allan had no recording contract with Virgin and sued the record company, claiming that he had been neither credited nor paid by them. Consequently, Virgin's compilation album Cash Cows, which featured the Professionals' track "Kick Down the Doors", was withdrawn and the album was shelved. After Allan left the band, he was replaced by ex-Subway Sect bassist Paul Myers, with Ray McVeigh also joining the band as a second guitarist. The new line-up of the Professionals later re-recorded previous material so that Allan would not be owed any further royalties, but their debut album would remain unreleased until 1981. The band recorded radio sessions for John Peel's Radio 1, which aired on 10 November 1980, to promote the planned release of the single "Join the Professionals" that same month.

=== 1981–1982: I Didn't See It Coming and break-up ===
Due to difficulties in finding a producer, the release of "Join the Professionals" was repeatedly delayed until June 1981. Manager Hill left soon afterwards to focus on the Pretenders, and John Curd was chosen as his replacement. The band recorded further sessions with BBC, this time for The Evening Show with Mike Read on 15 December 1981. The band's first album release, I Didn't See It Coming, was produced by Nigel Gray and released in November 1981. The album was supported by UK and U.S. tour dates, and the release of the single "The Magnificent". The band's American tour was cut short when Cook, Myers, and McVeigh were injured in a car accident. The Professionals returned to America in the spring of 1982 after a hiatus for recovery, but Jones' and Myers' drug problems further hampered the band's prospects, and eventually the band split up that same year.

Later that year, "Join the Professionals" was featured in the movie Ladies and Gentlemen, The Fabulous Stains along with three other songs written by Cook and Jones, "Conned Again", "La La La", and "Don't Blow It All the Way". The pair, along with the Clash bassist Paul Simonon and actor Ray Winstone, appeared in the movie as the band the Looters.

=== 2015–2024: Reunion and new albums ===
In celebration of the release of a three-disc set (The Complete Professionals) by Universal Music Group on 16 October 2015, the Professionals, with Tom Spencer filling in for Steve Jones, reunited for a concert at the 100 Club. This reunion also included a warm-up gig at the Fleece in Bristol three days prior to the main show. The band returned to the capital in June 2016 for a co-headline performance with the Rich Kids at the Islington Academy.

In March 2017, the band announced via their official Facebook page that the line-up of founding member Paul Cook along with Paul Myers and Tom Spencer would be releasing the first new music under the Professionals name in 35 years. Although Steve Jones wasn't officially listed as a member of this new incarnation of the group, the band confirmed it was with his full blessing and that he was featured on the album alongside other guests including Marco Pirroni and Billy Duffy.

2018 saw some UK live appearances by the band, like the Rebellion and Isle of Wight Festivals. Chris McCormack (3 Colours Red) took on guitar duties. Also, during this year, original bass player Paul Myers had to step aside for health reasons. Toshi JC Ogawa, the band's tech guy, stepped in as bass player. They supported Billy Idol on his English dates.

In 2021, Chris Catalyst joined the band as a touring member. In 2023, Chris McCormack and Toshi JC Ogawa left the band and were replaced by Dean Croney and Marc Hayward. In April 2024, the band announced that they had split up.

== Legacy ==
A best-of album was eventually released in 2005, containing material from their one album, four singles, and the album's-worth of demos recorded with Andy Allan. Ten years later, the compilation was expanded further with the release of The Complete Professionals, which features all of their studio tracks, alternate recordings, and radio sessions.

Their song "Join the Professionals" was covered by the Epoxies.

== Personnel ==
Former

- Paul Cook − drums, backing vocals (1979–1982, 2015–2024)
- Steve Jones − lead guitar, vocals (1979–1982)
- Andy Allan − bass, backing vocals (1979–1980)
- Paul Myers − bass, backing vocals (1980–1982, 2015–2018)
- Ray McVeigh − rhythm guitar, backing vocals (1980–1982, 2015–2016)
- Tom Spencer − guitar, vocals (2015–2024)
- Chris McCormack − guitar, backing vocals (2017–2023)
- Toshi JC Ogawa − bass, backing vocals (2018–2023)
- Dean Croney − guitar (2023–2024)
- Marc Hayward − bass (2023–2024)

Timeline

== Discography ==
=== Studio albums ===
- I Didn't See It Coming (1981)
- The Professionals (1997)
- What in the World (2017)
- SNAFU (2021)

=== Live album ===
- Live In London (2020)

=== EPs ===
- 2020 - "Kingdom Come"/"Reality"/"1, 2, 3 (TV Session)"/"Rewind (TV Session)" (JTP Records, January 2020)
- 2020 - "Curl Up And Cry"/"Fade Away"/"Going, Going, Gone (TV Session)"/"Kick Down The Doors (TV Session)" (JTP Records, February 2020)
- 2020 - "Twenty 20 Vision"/"One That Got Away"/"Join The Professionals (Live)"/"Good Man Down (TV Session)" (JTP Records, March 2020)

=== Compilations ===
- The Best of The Professionals (2005)
- The Complete Professionals (2015)

== See also ==
- List of British punk bands
- List of Peel sessions
- Timeline of punk rock
