= Tom Spencer (musician) =

British singer and guitarist (born 1967)

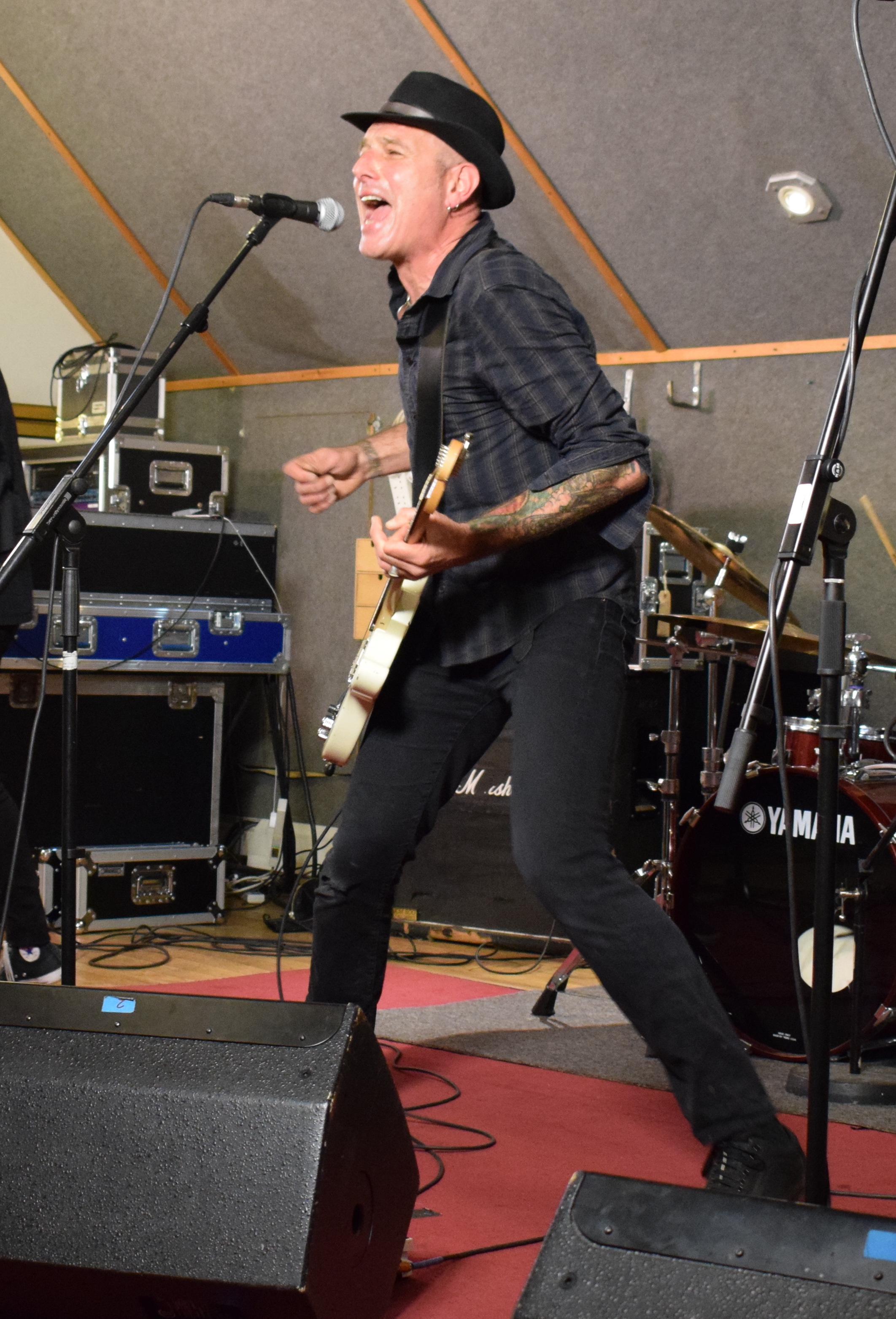
- Spencer performing with the Professionals in 2017

Background information
- Born: 30 June 1967 (age 59); Chipping Barnet, London, England
- Origin: Shepherd's Bush, London, England
- Genres: Rock, punk rock
- Occupations: Singer, musician, songwriter
- Instruments: Guitar, vocals
- Years active: 1991–present
- Labels: The End, Sub Pop, Automaton

Tom Spencer (born 30 June 1967) is an English singer, guitarist and songwriter. He was the previous frontman for the punk rock band The Professionals.

== Early life and music career ==
Born in West London and the son of novelist and musician John B. Spencer, Spencer began gigging in his teens, firstly singing backing vocals for his father's bands in London and then supporting him with his own school formed bands. He continued his musical education as guitarist for his father, touring Europe for the first time.

Back home he played guitar for Motherhive in 1989 – a band fronted by Blue Zoo's Andy Overall They released one album 'Richard'.

In the early 1990s he joined new wave/punk outfit Big Boy Tomato. They released two EPs 'Acton Baby' and 'Hormones and Hangovers'. Big Boy Tomato were a support band for the likes of Stiff Little Fingers, The Cropdusters, The Godfathers, Mega City 4, Die Toten Hosen and The Toy Dolls. They signed to Cargo Records but their debut album was not released at the time, instead enjoying a much-belated release in 2017, courtesy of now-defunct London label Foof Records.

During this time Spencer became guitarist for punk legends The Lurkers, joining Arturo Bassick and Dan Tozer for around 6 years, and played on the Lurkers album 'Ripped and Torn'. The Lurkers toured Germany regularly as a result of Die Toten Hosen championing them with covers of the tracks 'New Guitar in Town' and 'Shadow'. The original Lurkers in 1978 were signed to Beggars Banquet, the same recording label as The Louts (a John B. Spencer band).

Sugarsnatch, a splinter group of Big Boy Tomato, featured Spencer on lead vocals and guitar for the first time. One album 'Mad Cows and Englishmen' was written and released in the space of three weeks, drawing on influences from the trio's love of comics. Sugarsnatch only played in the UK twice, concentrating on the European circuit.

=== The Yo-Yos ===
In 1998 Toy Dolls frontman Michael Algar (aka Olga) invited Spencer to sing backing vocals on his forthcoming album One More Megabyte. During this session he bonded with Danny McCormack from The Wildhearts and the seed of what was to become The Yo-Yos was born. The Yo-Yos released two EPs for Rebound Records – 'Out of My Mind' and 'Rumble(d)'. After touring the UK as support for The Backyard Babies in 1999 the band was signed by US label Sub Pop and released their debut album 'Uppers & Downers' in 2000. Two US tours followed, before splitting due to differences within the band and Danny McCormack's well publicised drug problems.

In 2005 Spencer and McCormack reformed The Yo-Yos with a new line-up. The band recorded a new EP entitled Given Up Giving Up released through Undergroove and toured the UK supporting 3 Colours Red and Antiproduct. The band parted ways shortly afterwards following the re-emergence of Danny's drug issues. After a seven-year hiatus, The Yo-Yos reformed for a one-off gig in February 2012, to celebrate McCormack's 40th birthday. The band has continued to make sporadic live appearances since then, including Download Festival in 2012 and Sonisphere Festival in 2013.

=== The Loyalties ===
In 2006 The Loyalties were formed in Soho, London, with Tom Spencer fronting on vocals and playing bass. The band release two EPs along with split 7-inch singles with The Supersuckers, Duff McKagan's Loaded and Berlin's 'Radio Dead Ones' before releasing their debut album So Much For Soho on Devil's Jukebox label in 2008. The Loyalties toured the UK in 2008 with The New York Dolls, Loaded, Black Lungs and The Wildhearts. Their last album Til the death of Rock'n'Roll was released in 2013 and came with an accompanying whodunnit? novel of the same name.

=== The Professionals ===
On 16 October 2015, Spencer filled in for Steve Jones for The Professionals reunion concert at the 100 Club in celebration of the release of a three disc set (The Complete Professionals) by Universal Music Group.

In January 2016, the band announced three shows in March. A joint headline show at the Islington Academy in London with Rich Kids followed on 23 June of the same year.

In January 2017, The Professionals announced their new official line-up of Spencer, Paul Cook and original bass player Paul Myers. The band also announced the release of the first Professionals album in 35 years. What In The World, a 10 track album of original material due for release on 27 October 2017. The album features guest appearances from Steve Jones, Duff McKagen, Mick Jones, Phil Collen and Billy Duffy among others.

The band continued to play live shows in 2017 appearing at KOKO in London as part of Camden Rocks in May as well as a headlining performance at Rebellion Festival on the Opera Stage in August.

=== Other appearances ===
Spencer has made numerous appearances in other bands over the years including Banjoey Ramone – a skiffle/punk outfit consisting of ex and current members of The Loyalties, Demented are Go!, Grit and Urban Voodoo Machine.

He also plays in his family band Fastlane Roogalator with his brothers Syd and Will (the band is a tribute to their father John B Spencer). The band have released two albums, the self entitled Fast Lane Roogalator (2003) and 3 Sessions Later (2005).

Spencer has been a one time member of Ginger Wildheart and Friends, The Dogs D'Amour, The Vincent Razorbacks and Swill and The Swaggerband.

He currently plays banjo and guitar with folk punk band The Men They Couldn't Hang, and appears on their albums Devil on The Wind (2009) and The Defiant (2014).

== Art career ==
Spencer is a stained glass artist and owns a business 'Tattoo Glass' based in Chiswick, West London. His work is based on panel designs inspired by tattoo art and has been commissioned throughout the UK by private collectors, shops, bars and clubs. In 2014–2015 his glass work is displayed in the Victoria and Albert Museum, London as part of the 'Tiki Love Truck' installation – a mobile mosaic mausoleum. The piece forms part of the exhibition by artist Carrie Reichardt 'Disobedient Objects', inspired by protest movements. The exhibition is set to tour the world from February 2015. Spencer exhibits his work at Bankrobber Gallery, Mayfair He also manages traditional stained glass restoration and commissions through 'West London Stained Glass'.
