= Bruce Faulconer =

American musician

- Born: Dallas, Texas
- Occupations: Composer, record producer
- Instruments: Piano, keyboards, synthesizer, guitar, trumpet
- Years active: 1960s–present
- Labels: Faulconer Productions; CakeMix Recording

Bruce Laland Faulconer is an American composer, musician, and music producer. He is the President of Faulconer Productions Music Corporation and its CakeMix Recording Studio, based in Dallas, Texas. Faulconer wrote the score for 243 episodes of the Funimation English dub of the Japanese anime series Dragon Ball Z which aired in America from 1999 to 2003 on Cartoon Network and composed the theme tune of the US version of the 1991 film Dragon Ball Z: Lord Slug. He has since released a remastered nine album volume series of his works, The Best of Dragonball Z.

He has written numerous works for orchestra, chamber ensembles, piano, choral music and instrumental groups since the 1960s. A number of his works have been performed by the Dallas Symphony Orchestra and others and he has worked extensively with various universities and colleges, most notably the University of Texas. Compositions include "Saxophone and Percussion" (1972), "Music for Chamber Orchestra" (1975), "Interface I" (1978), "Fantasia for Solo Viola (1980), "Sonata for flute and piano" (1986) and "Washington-on-the-Brazos, a Symphonic Poem" (1986), "Fantasia No. 2 for Solo Viola" (1990), and "Dragon Amnesty"—a Concerto for Piano and Orchestra (2020).

Since 2020 he has collaborated with children's author Chris Parsons in composing songs for his children's audiobook series, A Little Spark, which is to be adapted into an animated children's TV series. Faulconer has composed for numerous commercials, and in March 1995 he won a Golden ADDY Award at the American Advertising Awards for composing the music to a hunting commercial.

== Early life and education ==
Faulconer was born in Dallas, Texas, to a naval aviator father. Due to his father's career, the family lived in various locations, including California, Florida, Hawaii and New Jersey. At ten years of age, he began piano lessons and began composing music after his teacher taught him the fundamentals of music notation.

His high school band director noticed his talent and requested that he arrange one of his compositions for the band to play, which led to him conducting the piece when it was performed at a spring concert. In 1968, while in Point Mugu, California, he composed the entire music, with the exception of two hymns, for Scout Sunday in the Protestant services at the Point Mugu Missile Base. His compositions included an anthem called "They Shall Not Want " for the chapel choir, a choral introduction to the service, a benediction, a choral entitled "Amen", and a Prelude and Postlude for a brass trio in which he played lead trumpet. Boys' Life described his music as "somewhat unconventional in its fresh, bold style, and warm and rich in appeal".

Faulconer enrolled at the University of Texas to study aerospace engineering. Unable to forget about music, he asked the director of composition at the music department for permission to take the final exam in music theory; after achieving a high grade, he changed his major to music, studying under resident composer Hunter Johnson. Faulconer earned a Bachelor of Music degree with high honors in theory and composition, a Master of Music in composition, and a Doctorate of Musical Arts in composition.

Faulconer was subsequently awarded two Ohio State University presidential postdoctoral fellowships and an Ohio Arts Council grant. While living in Ohio, he taught music for a period at Denison University in Granville. He then settled in Dallas, where he continued to teach for a few years and began composing for the Dallas Symphony Orchestra.

== Career ==
=== Early composing career ===
In 1971, Faulconer registered the copyright for the composition "Suite No. 3". In 1972 he won second place for a composition named "Saxophone and Percussion" in the World Saxophone Congress Composition competition. In 1973, Faulconer's "Septet" was performed by the New Music Ensemble at the University of Texas. In 1975, he received the first prize of $500 in the first annual Shenna Meeker Memorial Composer's Competition, which led to his piece "Music for Chamber Orchestra" being performed by the Fort Worth Chamber Orchestra on May 2 of that year. At this time he was working as a teaching assistant in music theory at the University of Texas while working on a doctorate in music composition under Karl Korte.

Faulconer's "Interface I" premiered in September 1978 at the International Gaudeamus Music Week in the Netherlands. Concerts of his work were put on in Amsterdam, Rotterdam, Utrecht, and Hilversum, and they were also broadcast over Radio Netherlands. In 1979, Faulconer composed "Interface IV : Music for Clarinet, Tape, and Bass clarinet".

On April 16 1980, the NT Chamber Orchestra of the University of North Texas in Denton, Texas put on a performance of Faulconer's "Music for Chamber Orchestra" along with Mozart's "Overture to Don Giovanni". On April 25–26, Faulconer was one of the composers featured at the first New Music Festival at Bowling Green State University. He was a recipient of a National Endowment for the Arts for 1981–82 and composed a work for chorus which was commissioned by the Marygrove College of Detroit. As a composer he was invited to the MacDowell Colony for a residency in 1982. His "Sonata for Flute and Piano", and "Concerto for Trumpet and Orchestra" were released in 1986 along with his "Washington-on-the-Brazos, a Symphonic Poem". "Washington-on-the-Brazos" was premiered by the Dallas Symphony Orchestra on 10 July 1986. He composed "Fantasia for Solo Viola" in 1980 and "Fantasia No. 2 for Solo Viola" in 1990. Fantasia No. 2, subtitled "Fatter Fiddles Flowing Freely", was performed at Bethany College in Lindsborg, Kansas, during a two-day residence by Faulconer on March 1 1991, where it was commissioned for Professor T. David Lowe.

Faulconer has composed for numerous commercials, and in March 1995 he won a Golden ADDY Award at the American Advertising Awards for his musical contribution to a hunting commercial shot in the Wasatch Mountains of northern Utah.

In 1997, Faulconer composed the score to the David Stephens sci-fi film Lebensborn, which also used some of the music of Richard Wagner.

=== Dragon Ball Z ===
From 1999 to 2003, Faulconer composed music for the American version of the Japanese animated series Dragon Ball Z, scoring 243 episodes which aired on Cartoon Network until 2008. Commissioned by FUNimation, his role in the series began with Episode 67/68 of season 3 in 1999 and ended with Episode 291 in 2003. In finding inspiration for composing for the series, Faulconer has stated:

"I would watch episodes and keep in mind what music would fit the mood. I would follow the characters and then get a feeling for how everything was coming together. I brought out a tempo map, which was a kind of organized manuscript, to start. The inspiration for the themes would come from the characters; what they talked about or what they did. Since there was such a long arc, almost 300 episodes, I used a lot of leitmotifs. Sometimes there were heavy pieces, too, and some pieces carried you through an arc with a character."

Faulconer also composed music for the American version of Dragon Ball Z: Lord Slug. The Dallas Observer wrote that the Dragon Ball Z: Lord Slug score:

"conveys pulse-pounding action and promises of adventures with chord-spewing guitar riffs and heavy moments of sadness and tension by using synthesized beats and echoing chimes. The music can capture the attention of anyone who has the TV on in the background, inevitably sucking them into the action."

Faulconer has since recorded and remastered a nine album volume soundtrack series "The Best of Dragonball Z" at his CakeMix Recording Studio, consisting of almost nine hours of his Dragon Ball Z musical score.

=== Post-Dragon Ball Z work ===
In 2004, Faulconer worked on the sound design and surround sound mix for the animated feature film Lady Death: The Motion Picture. He has scored music for three seasons of Your New House on the Discovery Channel, Your House and Home, To Life on iLife, and Reality of Speed on the Spike and Speed Channel. He has also composed for Bass Champs on HDNet and the Outdoor Channel. In 2013, Faulconer composed the music for the Tony Zavaleta feature film, The Bystander Theory.

Since 2020 he has collaborated with children's author Chris Parsons for his children's audiobook series, A Little Spark, a fantasy series featuring a "brave young mouse, a fireless fire-breathing dragon, a freezing world, and an enemy to conquer". By mid-2021 he had composed 12 songs for the series, which was released on Amazon and iTunes. In September 2020 he released the track "Grandma's House". In February 2022 it was announced that BLKBX Creative Group had secured a rights deal with Parsons's Zuroam Media to adapt the book series into an animated children's TV series. Faulconer has composed a Concerto for Piano and Orchestra, known as "Dragon Amnesty", in which he draws upon fantasy and sci-fi influences.

He is the President of Faulconer Productions Music Corporation and its CakeMix Recording Studio, and is based in Dallas, Texas.

== Personal life ==
Faulconer married Carolyn Cail in Port Isabel, Texas on December 28, 1972. He remarried to Lisa Sholtus on May 11, 1996, in Dallas; they have two sons.

== See also ==
- Dragonball Z American Soundtrack series
