= Preacher Stone =

American band

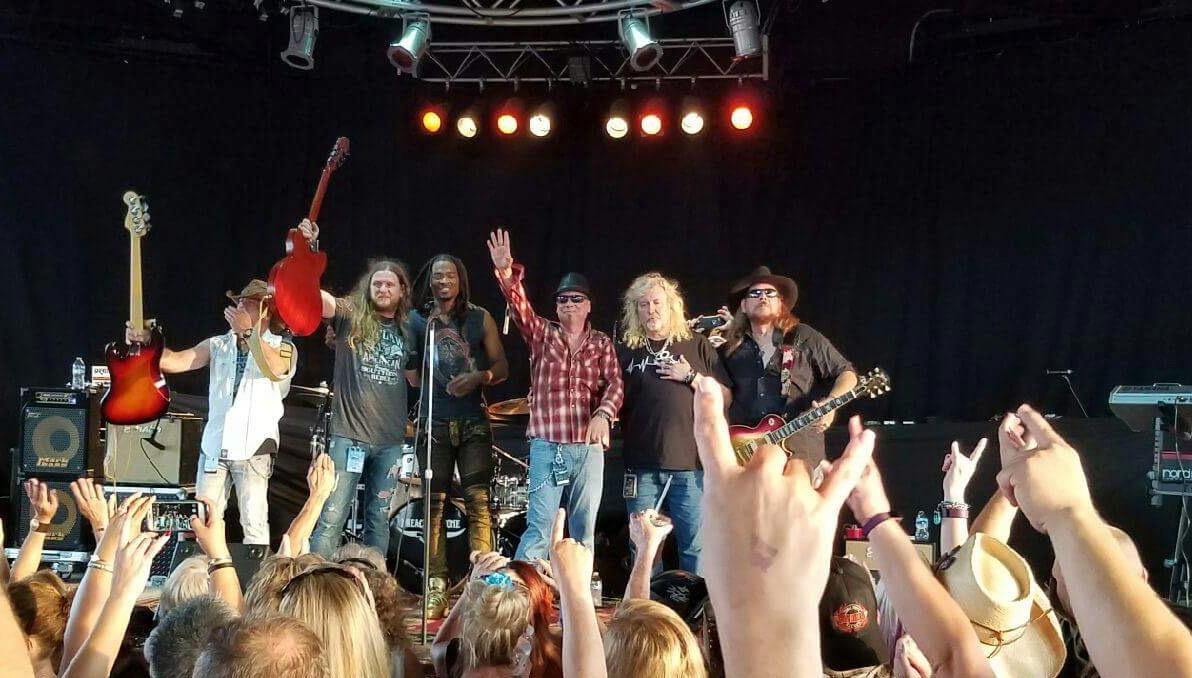

Background information
- Origin: Charlotte, North Carolina
- Genres: Southern rock, Classic rock
- Years active: 2008–present
- Labels: NoNo Bad Dog Productions
- Members: Marty Hill; Ronnie Riddle; Ben Robinson; Josh Wyatt; Jim Bolt; Johnny Webb
- Website: preacherstone.com

Preacher Stone is an American southern rock/classic rock band formed in 2008, in Charlotte, North Carolina, by SESAC songwriters Marty Hill and Ronnie Riddle. They released their self-titled debut album in August 2009. FX Networks popular television series Sons of Anarchy launched the band using their music on two seasons.

== History ==
The band was formed by Marty Hill and Ronnie Riddle in 2008. The band currently consists of Ben Robinson and Darrell Whitt on guitars, Ronnie Riddle on vocals, Josh Wyatt on drums, Jim Bolt on bass.

Preacher Stone has performed in the United States and Europe as headliner and as the supporting act for artists such as Blackberry Smoke, ZZ Top, Black Stone Cherry, Lynyrd Skynyrd, Molly Hatchet, The Outlaws, Shooter Jennings, Lucinda Williams, Steve Earle, Charlie Daniels, Marshall Tucker, Dan Baird, and Homemade Sin.

The band released their first album in 2009. Their song Not Today from their debut album appeared in Sons of Anarchy seasons 3 and season 5. They released their second album Uncle Buck's Vittles in 2010. Two songs from their second album were featured in an American independent film Snitch and in Edward Furlong's 2011 movie Absolute Killers. In 2014, they released their third album Paydirt produced by Bruce Irwine.

The band signed an artist management deal with Alien Entertainment in 2016. Their fourth studio album, Remedy, is slated to be released on September 1, 2016, under the NoNo Bad Dog Production label.

== Band members ==
- Ronnie Riddle – Lead vocals, harmonica and mandolin
- Ben Robinson – Lead guitar and vocals
- Josh Wyatt – Drums, percussion and vocals
- Jim Bolt – Bass and vocals
- Darrell Whitt– Guitar and vocals

== Former members ==
- Marty Hill – Lead guitar, slide, dobro and vocals (2008–2024; died 2024)
- Johnny Webb – Keyboards and vocals (2008–2024; died 2024)

== Discography ==
- Preacher Stone (2009)
- Uncle Buck's Vittles (2010)
- Paydirt (2014)
- Remedy (2016)
