= American Pearl (album) =

Studio album by American Pearl
- Released: August 22, 2000
- Recorded: 2000
- Genre: Hard rock
- Label: Wind-up
- Producer: Steve Jones; Mudrock

American Pearl is the only studio album by the American hard rock band of the same name. Released on August 22, 2000, it features the singles "If We Were Kings" and "Free Your Mind". The track "Automatic" was featured on the Scream 3 soundtrack. Along with "Free Your Mind", it also appeared in the Funimation dub of the animated movie Dragon Ball Z: Lord Slug in 2001. The tracks "Seven Years" and "Revelation" appeared in Dragon Ball Z: Cooler's Revenge the following year.

After signing with Wind-up Records in 1999, the band opened concerts for Buckcherry and The Cult and even acquired a spot on Woodstock '99. In promotion of their debut album, American Pearl toured extensively through North America and Japan, as a headliner and as support act for Kiss, Creed, 3 Doors Down, and Days of the New.

Stylistically, American Pearl differs from the popular alternative metal scene of the era and follows more in the vein classic hard rock acts and punk-laced LA bands of the 1980s. Indeed, the album was produced by Steve Jones of Sex Pistols fame and Mudrock. However, American Pearl has also been categorized as post-grunge.

== Reception ==
Professional ratings
Review scores
Source	Rating
AllMusic	3/5 stars
CANOE	favorable

MacKenzie Wilson of AllMusic gave the album 3 out of 5 stars and noted, "If it were the heyday of '70s arena rock, L.A.-based hard rock outfit American Pearl would be just as cool as Foreigner, Survivor, Kansas, and Boston" and that the band "captures such memories and maintains a gnarling edge." However, Wilson also claimed that American Pearl's style "pinpoints" them as "just another alternative rock band".

CANOE's Darryl Sterdan gave a favorable albeit brief review of the album. He described the band as having the "sleaze-rock punch of Guns N' Roses and Mötley Crüe" and "Sunset Strip sensibility" of Buckcherry. Sterdan summed up by stating "Thankfully, American Pearl are as talented with a hook as Quinn must be with that needle."

CMJ noted the group's indebtedness to 1970s hard rock and its distance from contemporaneous rap rock bands such as Korn and Limp Bizkit.

== Track listing ==
All lyrics are written by Kevin Roentgen; all music is composed by American Pearl.

1. "California" – 3:31
2. "Automatic" – 3:24
3. "Giveaway" – 3:03
4. "Underground" – 4:56
5. "Free Your Mind" – 3:24
6. "Truth" – 3:36
7. "Bleed" – 4:08
8. "Seven Years" – 4:28
9. "Revelation" – 3:08
10. "Amphetamine Girl" – 3:43
11. "If We Were Kings" – 3:56

== Personnel ==
American Pearl

- Kevin Roentgen – vocals, guitar
- Kevin Quinn – guitars
- Rooney Rocha – bass guitar, backing vocals
- Noah Shain – drums

Additional personnel

- Steve Jones – producer, additional guitar (1)
- Mudrock – producer
- Scott Humphrey – mixing
- Frank Gryner – mixing
- Steve Mixdorf – assistant engineer
- Patrick Burkholder – assistant engineer
- Dan Burns – assistant engineer
- Justin Walden – digital blending
- Mike Fasano – drum technician
- Gersh – drum technician
- T.K. Tyson – guitar technician
- Eddy Schreyer – mastering
