= 2000 NAPA 500 =

Auto race run at Atlanta Motor Speedway in 2000

Race details
- Race 34 of 34 in the 2000 NASCAR Winston Cup Series season
- Atlanta Motor Speedway (1997-present configuration)
- Date: November 20, 2000
- Official name: NAPA 500
- Location: Atlanta Motor Speedway, Hampton, Georgia
- Course: Permanent racing facility
- Course length: 1.54 miles (2.502 km)
- Distance: 328 laps, 500.5 mi (813.12 km)
- Weather: Cold with temperatures of 55.4 °F (13.0 °C); wind speeds of 18.1 miles per hour (29.1 km/h)
- Average speed: 141.296 mph (227.394 km/h)

Pole position
Driver	Jeff Gordon	Hendrick Motorsports
- Time: 28.537 seconds

Most laps led
Driver	Jerry Nadeau	Hendrick Motorsports
- Laps: 155

Winner
No. 25	Jerry Nadeau	Hendrick Motorsports

Television in the United States
- Network: ESPN
- Announcers: Bob Jenkins; Benny Parsons; Ned Jarrett

The 2000 NAPA 500 was a NASCAR Winston Cup Series racing event that was held on November 20, 2000, at Atlanta Motor Speedway in Hampton, Georgia. It was originally scheduled for November 19 but was postponed because of rain and run on Monday. It was the 34th and final race of the 2000 NASCAR season.

Jerry Nadeau, driving the #25 Michael Holigan Chevrolet Monte Carlo for Hendrick Motorsports, won the race. It was his first and only victory in the Winston Cup Series.

After the race, the Winston Cup was formally awarded to series champion Bobby Labonte, the driver of the #18 Interstate Batteries Pontiac Grand Prix for Joe Gibbs Racing. Labonte had won the Winston Cup championship the previous week by finishing 4th in the Pennzoil 400 at Homestead-Miami Speedway, and he followed that up with a 5th place finish in this race.

== Background ==
=== Events ===
The event was the final race to be broadcast on ESPN until 2007 and the last one with its broadcast team of Bob Jenkins, Benny Parsons, and Ned Jarrett. Jenkins would remain at ESPN in his role as their lead voice for the Indy Racing League, while Parsons joined NBC Sports for their NASCAR broadcasts and TNT Sports for their NASCAR broadcasts as well. Jarrett, meanwhile, retired from broadcasting after over twenty years covering events for ESPN and CBS.

It would also be the final race in the career of Darrell Waltrip, who called the 2000 season his "Victory Tour" in the #66 Kmart Ford Taurus for Haas-Carter Motorsports.

Wally Dallenbach Jr. also retired from full-time racing after the race, as he had signed to join Parsons as a booth analyst for NBC and TNT. He drove the #75 Pizza Hut /TBS (American TV channel) Ford for Galaxy Motorsports in the race

Scott Pruett, who had joined the Cup Series for 2000 driving the #32 Tide Ford Taurus for PPI Motorsports, finished what would be his only full-time season driving in NASCAR; he was released from the team after the season.

=== Team changes ===
- After spending the previous seven seasons as an owner-driver, Bill Elliott ran his final race in his #94 McDonald's Ford Taurus. He sold his team to Ray Evernham, who promptly signed Elliott to pilot one of his two Dodge Intrepids for 2001.
- Michael Waltrip ran his last race in the #7 NationsRent Chevrolet for Ultra Motorsports. He would join Dale Earnhardt, Inc. to drive the #15 NAPA Auto Parts Chevrolet in 2001.
- Robby Gordon ran his last race for Team Menard in the #13 Turtle Wax Ford, as the team shut down after the season.
- Bobby Hamilton ran his last race in the #4 Kodak Chevrolet for Morgan-McClure Motorsports. He would move over to drive the #55 Square D Chevrolet for Andy Petree Racing in 2001 replacing Kenny Wallace, who would take over the #27 Eel River Racing Pontiac from Mike Bliss, whose team failed to qualify for this race.
- Buckshot Jones ran his last race for his family owned team in the #00 Crown Fiber Pontiac, as he was signed by Petty Enterprises to join the team for 2001.
- Kevin Lepage attempted to qualify the #16 Familyclick.com Ford for Roush Racing but did not make the field; this would prove to be his final ride in the car and the last full-time race for the #16 until 2003.

==== Team suppliers ====
- Bill Davis Racing, which fielded the #22 Caterpillar Pontiac for Ward Burton, the #93 Amoco Ultimate Pontiac for Dave Blaney, and the #23 AT&T Pontiac for Scott Wimmer.
- Team SABCO, which fielded the #40 Bellsouth Chevrolet for Sterling Marlin and the #01 Coors Light Chevrolet for Bobby Hamilton Jr. This was also the team's last race with Felix Sabates as sole owner.
- Petty Enterprises, which fielded the #43 Cheerios Pontiac for John Andretti and saw Steve Grissom fail to qualify the #44 Hot Wheels Pontiac.
- Melling Racing attempted to qualify the #9 Kodiak Ford with Stacy Compton but did not make the field.

==== Team sponsors ====
- Mark Martin's #6 Ford was running its final race with Valvoline sponsorship as the team signed on to sponsor Johnny Benson Jr.'s #10 at MB2 Motorsports. The team picked up sponsorship from Pfizer for 2001, with its Viagra brand promoted (this led to Eel River Racing losing its sponsorship).
- Dale Jarrett ran his last race in the #88 with Ford Credit as his primary sponsor; he would begin running with United Parcel Service as his sponsor the next year and would carry that sponsorship for the remainder of his racing career.
- John Deere ceased sponsoring the #97 Ford after the race. This left Kurt Busch, who had taken over the ride near the end of the season, sponsorless entering 2001, but he would eventually become identified with his new sponsor Newell Rubbermaid and its Sharpie line of writing implements.

In an unexpected final occurrence, Dale Earnhardt recorded the last top five finish of his racing career as he finished second to Nadeau. The reason this was unexpected was because of his death in the Daytona 500 at the beginning of the following season.

== Race ==
It wasn't uncommon for a NASCAR Winston Cup Series race in the 1990s to have only three to five cars on the lead lap. If someone spun, didn't hit the wall or anyone else, and could fire it up and get going, there would be no reason to wave a caution flag for multiple laps. Between 8-12 cars on the lead lap was considered to be a typical performance at a NASCAR Winston Cup Series race during the 1990s; compared to the more than 15 cars on the lead lap at short track in the current NASCAR.

Approximately 14% of the race was run under a caution flag; the average green flag run was 31 laps. Several accidents and oil spills caused eight caution periods for 44 laps. Three hundred and twenty-five laps were completed in 3 hours, 32 minutes and 32 seconds. Jerry Nadeau beat Dale Earnhardt to the finish line by 1.338 seconds to win the race (his first and only victory in Winston Cup competition). ESPN's Bob Jenkins, calling his last Winston Cup event for ESPN, called the finish thus:

Back in March of '81, Darrell Waltrip took the checkered flag to win the very first race we televised on ESPN...and in November of 2000...Jerry Nadeau wins the final race on ESPN!

As the competitors of the race completed lap 320, Dale Earnhardt finally achieved the feat of completing 10000 laps in a single NASCAR Winston Cup Series season before his death at the 2001 Daytona 500. The race was officially started shortly after 1:00 PM Eastern Standard Time and finished at approximately 4:32 PM EST.

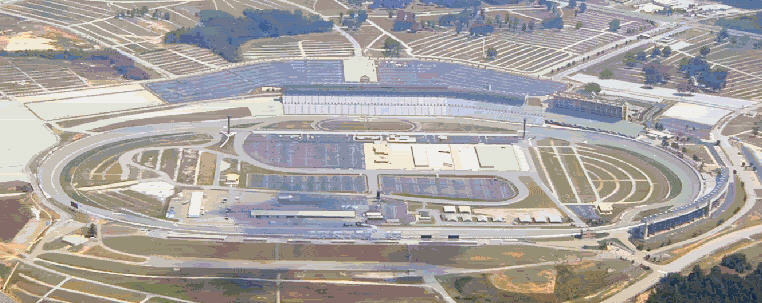
Atlanta Motor Speedway, the race track where the race was held.

Geoff Bodine finished last due to an engine problem on lap 11. Buckshot Jones was the lowest finisher to complete the event, finishing in 37th place, 48 laps behind the lead lap drivers. Jeremy Mayfield had a winning racecar that was forced to leave the race on lap 53 due to engine problems; this performance was typical of his 2000 NASCAR Winston Cup Series season. Darrell Waltrip finishes 34th in his final Cup start and 7 laps behind Jerry Nadeau; even though it was certainly not the "victory tour" that he had planned. For the 2001 season, Waltrip would begin working as a color commentator for Fox Sports' coverage of Winston Cup racing. Waltrip's retirement also ended a rocky relationship between himself and Travis Carter Motorsports that lasted since the 1998 NASCAR Winston Cup Series season.

According to certain fans, the final years of Waltrip's NASCAR career had involved him allowing Jeff Gordon to take a leading role. Jeff Gordon was in his early career at the time. Darrell Waltrip's career with Fox Sports commenced with the Budweiser Shootout on February 11, 2001. The following week, Waltrip provided commentary for the Daytona 500 race in which the death of Dale Earnhardt occurred on that race's final lap..

43 drivers, all born in the United States of America qualified for the NAPA 500, driving either Chevrolet, Ford or Pontiac cars. 13 other drivers failed to qualify, including Dick Trickle, Hut Stricklin, Morgan Shepherd and Hermie Sadler. Individual race earnings for each driver ranged from $180,550 to Jerry Nadeau ($337,550 when adjusted for inflation) to $34,982 to last-place finisher Geoff Bodine ($65,401 when adjusted for inflation). The total purse for the event was $2,336,442 ($4,368,131 when adjusted for inflation).

Notable crew chiefs who actively participated in this race included Robin Pemberton, Jimmy Fenning, Tony Eury, Sr., Greg Zipadelli, Donnie Wingo, Larry McReynolds, Hut Stricklin, Jeff Hammond among others.

This was the last NASCAR race of the 20th century and of the 2nd millennium. While the price of gasoline and oil would remain cheap throughout the first five years of the 21st century, the constant threat of fossil fuel depletion eventually caused NASCAR to adopt electronic fuel injection as a fuel-saving measure. Concern for the environment also caught the eye of NASCAR officials during the 21st century; they would make an attempt to reduce the carbon footprint that NASCAR elevated during the 1970s, 1980s, and 1990s.

The 2000 NASCAR Winston Cup Series season featured 14 different race winners. The season also saw the emergence of several notable younger drivers, including Matt Kenseth, Steve Park and Dale Earnhardt Jr.

At least five of the drivers involved in this race are no longer living as of 2020, including Blaise Alexander, Dick Trickle, Dale Earnhardt, Bobby Hamilton, and John Andretti.

=== Qualifying ===
Grid	No.	Driver	Manufacturer	Speed	Qualifying time	Owner	Sponsor
1	24	Jeff Gordon	Chevrolet	194.274	28.537	Rick Hendrick	Dupont Automotive Finishes
2	25	Jerry Nadeau	Chevrolet	193.299	28.681	Rick Hendrick	Michael Holigan Homes
3	88	Dale Jarrett	Ford	193.157	28.702	Yates Racing	Ford Quality Care
4	93	Dave Blaney	Pontiac	193.157	28.792	Bill Davis	Amoco Ultimate
5	46	Todd Bodine	Ford	192.253	28.837	Travis Carter	Big Kmart/Route 66 Jeans
6	6	Mark Martin	Ford	192.073	28.864	Jack Roush	Valvoline/Cummins
7	12	Jeremy Mayfield	Ford	191.987	28.877	Michael Kranefuss	Mobil 1
8	3	Dale Earnhardt	Chevrolet	191.403	28.965	Richard Childress	GM Goodwrench Service Plus
9	18	Bobby Labonte	Pontiac	191.278	28.984	Joe Gibbs	Interstate Batteries
10	75	Wally Dallenbach Jr.	Ford	191.113	29.009	Darwin Oordt	TBS Dinner & A Movie/Pizza Hut

== Results ==
Pos	No.	Driver	Team	Manufacturer	Laps	Laps led	Time/Status
1	25	Jerry Nadeau	Hendrick Motorsports	Chevrolet	325	155	3:32:32
2	3	Dale Earnhardt	Richard Childress Racing	Chevrolet	325	12	+1.338 seconds
3	22	Ward Burton	Bill Davis Racing	Pontiac	325	96	Lead lap under green flag
4	24	Jeff Gordon	Hendrick Motorsports	Chevrolet	325	4	Lead lap under green flag
5	18	Bobby Labonte	Joe Gibbs Racing	Pontiac	325	4	Lead lap under green flag
6	31	Mike Skinner	Richard Childress Racing	Chevrolet	325	1	Lead lap under green flag
7	2	Rusty Wallace	Penske-Kranefuss Racing	Ford	325	0	Lead lap under green flag
8	40	Sterling Marlin	Team SABCO	Chevrolet	325	0	Lead lap under green flag
9	17	Matt Kenseth	Roush Racing	Ford	324	0	+1 lap
10	10	Johnny Benson Jr.	MB2 Motorsports	Pontiac	324	0	+1 lap
11	94	Bill Elliott	Bill Elliott Racing	Ford	324	0	+1 lap
12	99	Jeff Burton	Roush Racing	Ford	324	0	+1 lap
13	77	Robert Pressley	Jasper Motorsports	Ford	324	6	+1 lap
14	46	Todd Bodine	Haas-Carter Motorsports	Ford	324	0	+1 lap
15	88	Dale Jarrett	Robert Yates Racing	Ford	323	2	+2 laps
16	4	Bobby Hamilton	Morgan–McClure Motorsports	Chevrolet	323	0	+2 laps
17	5	Terry Labonte	Hendrick Motorsports	Chevrolet	323	0	+2 laps
18	93	Dave Blaney	Bill Davis Racing	Pontiac	323	0	+2 laps
19	43	John Andretti	Petty Enterprises	Pontiac	323	0	+2 laps
20	8	Dale Earnhardt Jr.	Dale Earnhardt, Inc.	Chevrolet	322	0	+3 laps
21	1	Steve Park	Dale Earnhardt, Inc.	Chevrolet	322	1	+3 laps
22	23	Scott Wimmer	Bill Davis Racing	Pontiac	322	9	+3 laps
23	55	Kenny Wallace	Andy Petree Racing	Chevrolet	322	1	+3 laps
24	28	Ricky Rudd	Robert Yates Racing	Ford	321	0	+4 laps
25	33	Joe Nemechek	Andy Petree Racing	Chevrolet	321	0	+4 laps
26	36	Ken Schrader	MB2 Motorsports	Pontiac	321	0	+4 laps
27	13	Robby Gordon	Team Menard	Ford	321	0	+4 laps
28	11	Brett Bodine	Brett Bodine Racing	Ford	321	0	+4 laps
29	75	Wally Dallenbach Jr.	Galaxy Motorsports	Ford	320	0	+5 laps
30	50	Ricky Craven	Midwest Transit Racing	Chevrolet	320	0	+5 laps
31	01	Bobby Hamilton Jr.	Team SABCO	Chevrolet	319	0	+6 laps
32	32	Scott Pruett	PPI Motorsports	Ford	319	0	+6 laps
33	26	Jimmy Spencer	Haas-Carter Motorsports	Ford	318	0	+7 laps
34	66	Darrell Waltrip	Haas-Carter Motorsports	Ford	318	0	+7 laps
35	14	Rick Mast	A. J. Foyt Enterprises	Pontiac	317	0	+8 laps
36	97	Kurt Busch	Roush Racing	Ford	316	0	+9 laps
37	00	Buckshot Jones	Buckshot Racing	Pontiac	277	0	+48 laps
38	20	Tony Stewart	Joe Gibbs Racing	Pontiac	195	0	Handling
39	7	Michael Waltrip	Ultra Motorsports	Chevrolet	125	0	Crash
40	6	Mark Martin	Roush Racing	Ford	122	17	Engine
41	12	Jeremy Mayfield	Penske-Kranefuss Racing	Ford	53	17	Engine
42	21	Elliott Sadler	Wood Brothers Racing	Ford	18	0	Engine
43	35	Geoff Bodine	Andy Petree Racing	Chevrolet	11	0	Crash

=== Race statistics ===
Section reference:

- Time of race: 3:32:32
- Average Speed: 141.296 mph (227.394 km/h)
- Pole Speed: 194.274 mph (312.654 km/h)
- Cautions: 8 for 44 laps
- Margin of Victory: 1.338 sec
- Lead changes: 23
- Percent of race run under caution: 13.5%
- Average green flag run: 31.2 laps

Lap leaders
Laps	Leader
1–4	Jeff Gordon
5–26	Jerry Nadeau
27–37	Jeremy Mayfield
38–46	Ward Burton
47–52	Jeremy Mayfield
53–54	Jerry Nadeau
55–63	Scott Wimmer
64	Steve Park
65–81	Mark Martin
82–93	Dale Earnhardt
94–111	Jerry Nadeau
112	Kenny Wallace
113–130	Jerry Nadeau
131–136	Robert Pressley
137–138	Dale Jarrett
139–167	Ward Burton
168–191	Jerry Nadeau
192–195	Bobby Labonte
196–256	Jerry Nadeau
257–296	Ward Burton
297–299	Jerry Nadeau
300	Mike Skinner
301–318	Ward Burton
319–325	Jerry Nadeau

Total laps led
Laps led	Driver
155	Jerry Nadeau
96	Ward Burton
17	Mark Martin
17	Jeremy Mayfield
12	Dale Earnhardt
9	Scott Wimmer
6	Robert Pressley
4	Jeff Gordon
4	Bobby Labonte
2	Dale Jarrett
1	Mike Skinner
1	Steve Park
1	Kenny Wallace

Cautions: 8 for 44 laps
Laps	Reason
14–17	#35 (G. Bodine) accident turn 2
21–26	Oil turns 3/4
37–40	Competition
54–60	Oil turn 3
69–74	#7 (M. Waltrip) accident turn 4
111–115	#20 (Stewart) accident turn 2
130–135	#7 (M. Waltrip) accident turn 3
313–318	#32 (Pruett) spin backstraight

== Media ==
=== Television ===
The race was aired live on ESPN in the United States for the final time till 2007. Bob Jenkins, two-time 1964 race winner Ned Jarrett and 1973 Cup Series champion Benny Parsons called the race from the broadcast booth. Jerry Punch, Bill Weber, Ray Dunlap and John Kernan handled pit road for the television side.

ESPN
Booth announcers		Pit reporters
Lap-by-lap	Color-commentators	Pit reporters
Bob Jenkins	Ned Jarrett; Benny Parsons	Jerry Punch; Bill Weber; John Kernan; Ray Dunlap

== Standings after the race ==
Pos	Driver	Points	Differential
1	Bobby Labonte	5,130	0
2 ▲	Dale Earnhardt	4,865	-265
3 ▼	Jeff Burton	4,841	-289
4	Dale Jarrett	4,684	-446
5 ▲	Ricky Rudd	4,575	-555
6 ▼	Tony Stewart	4,570	-560
7	Rusty Wallace	4,544	-586
8	Mark Martin	4,410	-720
9	Jeff Gordon	4,361	-769
10	Ward Burton	4,152	-978

Preceded by 2000 Pennzoil 400	NASCAR Winston Cup Series Season; 2000-01	Succeeded by 2001 Daytona 500
