= I Didn't See It Coming =

Studio album by The Professionals
- Released: November 1981 (original LP); June 14, 2001 (CD edition)
- Recorded: 1981
- Studio: Surrey Sound Studios, Leatherhead, Surrey
- Genre: Punk rock; power pop
- Length: 38:32 (original LP); 63:29 (CD edition)
- Label: Virgin
- Producer: Nigel Gray with Steve Jones, Paul Cook

The Professionals chronology
I Didn't See It Coming (1981)	The Professionals (1997)

Singles from I Didn't See It Coming
- 1. "The Magnificent" Released: October 1981

I Didn't See It Coming is the debut album by punk rock band the Professionals. It was first released by Virgin Records in November 1981. On June 14, 2001, Virgin/EMI released a CD edition of the album, appending six tracks previously released as singles and two songs recorded for the mooted The Professionals album.

== Track listing ==
=== Original LP (1981) ===
All tracks are written by Paul Cook and Steve Jones except where noted

Side one
No.	Title	Writer(s)	Length
1.	"The Magnificent"		3:50
2.	"Payola"		3:37
3.	"Northern Slide"		3:26
4.	"Friday Night Square"	Cook, Jones, Ray McVeigh, Paul Myers	4:36
5.	"Kick Down the Doors" (McVeigh and Myers are uncredited for this song.)	Cook, Jones, McVeigh, Myers	4:32

Side two
No.	Title	Length
1.	"Little Boys"	4:13
2.	"All the Way"	3:19
3.	"Crescendo"	4:06
4.	"Madhouse"	3:15
5.	"Too Far to Fall"	3:52

=== 2001 CD Edition ===
All tracks are written by Paul Cook and Steve Jones except where noted

No.	Title	Writer(s)	Length
1.	"The Magnificent"		3:50
2.	"Payola"		3:37
3.	"Northern Slide"		3:26
4.	"Friday Night Square" (McVeigh and Myers are uncredited for this song.)	Cook, Jones, McVeigh, Myers	4:36
5.	"Kick Down the Doors"	Cook, Jones, McVeigh, Myers	4:32
6.	"Little Boys in Blue" (Originally titled as "Little Boys")		4:13
7.	"All the Way"		3:19
8.	"Crescendo"		4:06
9.	"Madhouse" (McVeigh and Myers are credited for this song, but this is incorrect.)		3:15
10.	"Too Far to Fall"		3:52
11.	"Just Another Dream"		3:04
12.	"Kamikaze"	Cook, Jones, Andy Allan	3:23
13.	"1-2-3"		2:57
14.	"Mods, Skins, Punks"		3:12
15.	"Join the Professionals"		3:17
16.	"Has Anybody Got an Alibi"		3:20
17.	"White Light White Heat"	Lou Reed	3:45
18.	"Baby I Don't Care"	Jerry Leiber, Mike Stoller	3:17

== Personnel ==
The Professionals

- Steve Jones − lead vocals, lead guitar
- Paul Cook − drums, backing vocals
- Ray McVeigh − rhythm guitar, backing vocals
- Paul Myers − bass
- Andy Allan − bass, backing vocals on tracks 11, 12, 13, 14, 17 and 18

Technical

- Bill Smith − sleeve design
- Gered Mankowitz − cover photography
