= Hank Dogs =

English folk band

- Origin: South London, England
- Genres: Folk, folk rock, alternative country
- Years active: 1992–present
- Members: Piano Pace; Andy Allan; Lily Ramona

Hank Dogs are an acoustic folk band from South London. The band members are Piano Pace, her ex-husband Andy Allan (formerly of Lightning Raiders and The Professionals), and his daughter Lily Ramona. Their music is considered to be in the English folk tradition. They started out in 1992 at an acoustic club in South London. In 1998 they traveled to Seattle with producer Jon Kertzer and played at the Bumbershoot Festival there.

Their first album Bareback, produced by Joe Boyd, was well received and was named Record of the Month for WXPN in Philadelphia. Their third album Fiveways was recorded in 2010 but remained unreleased until 2024 following the break up of the band. The band reunited to celebrate the release.

== Discography ==
Albums

- Bareback (1999)
- Half Smile (2000)
- Fiveways (2024)

Contributing artist

- The Rough Guide to English Roots Music (1998, World Music Network)
