= Dust for Life =

American rock band

Dust For Life
- Origin: Memphis, Tennessee
- Genres: Post-grunge; nu metal
- Years active: 1999–2008
- Labels: Wind-Up Records; Reach Out
- Past members: Jason Hughes; Chris Gavin; John Anderson; David Rhea; Josh Weil; Rick Shelton; Mike McSorley; Steve McClenaghan; Marc Gurley; Tim Fowler

Dust for Life was a post-grunge band from Memphis, Tennessee formed in 1999.

== Formation and initial success ==
After the dissolution of the Memphis grunge band Bacchanal, Jason Hughes was recruited by Tim Fowler and two members from the local Memphis rock band Spaceman to form DFL. Chris Gavin of the band Burning Blue was added and became the second main songwriter of the group.

Jason Hughes was the majority writer of the song “Seed”, which later went on to become one of the bands best selling songs.

In late 1999, DFL self-released a nine-track eponymous album. Then in April 2000, DFL recorded four songs ("Step into the Light", "Dirt into Dust", "Dragonfly", and "Where the Freaks Go") at Ardent Studios. This demo was overnighted to Jeff Hanson, manager of the band Creed, and they were subsequently signed to Wind-Up Records.

In October 2000, DFL released a second eponymous album containing all new songs with the exception of two re-recorded songs from their 1999 album. The album reached No. 26 on the Billboard Heatseekers chart. Two singles from the album also charted. In 2001, drummer Rick Shelton left DFL to join Course of Nature.

== Touring and money troubles ==
For much of 2001, DFL toured with Creed, 3 Doors Down, The Cult, Tantric, Disturbed, Orgy, Cold and Saliva.

In May 2001, DFL discovered its publishing money had been spent frivolously by their management and subsequently released the company. In July, they parted ways with Wind-Up Records due to contractual elements not being honored. At the end of the year, Jason Hughes also released an album with the band Third Harmonic Distortion. In 2001 the songs "Seed" "Dragonfly" and "Step into the light" were used in the movie Dragon Ball Z: Lord Slug.In early 2002, DFL embarked upon a headlining national tour with Tantric. The song "Poison" was used in the movie Dragonball Z Cooler's Revenge.

== Separate ways and reformation ==
After taking a break, the band's two primary songwriters (Hughes and Gavin) began work on the band's next release in July 2003. Later that year, DFL self-released an eight-song EP titled Degrees of Black.

Eventually DFL went on an indefinite hiatus. Chris Gavin formed the band Memphis Sound. Vocalist Jason Hughes formed the band Dark Things with Saving Abel guitarist Scott Bartlett in late 2006 with the intention of releasing an album on Warner Bros. Records. Yet the project never came to fruition. Instead, Hughes and Gavin announced on their MySpace blog in 2007 that DFL was to begin recording new material. In April 2008, the band released The Consequence Of Vanishing. Scott Bartlett was featured on the album. Hughes announced a line of clothing based on the title of the song "Dark Things Betray". The song "Release The Flood" was used by TNA Wrestling as the theme song for Slammiversary (2008).

== Another hiatus ==
In 2009, Jason Hughes released an album with the band Driving Eternity. The band later changed its name to Driving Into Eternity and released a 5-song EP in 2010.

Chris Gavin currently plays in the bands Kings Trio, White Noise Theory, and the cover band Hi-Fi Allstars. In 2009, White Noise Theory released his first full-length album, Self Titled. The album consists of some tracks from the Degrees Of Black album. In April 2011, White Noise Theory released Dust, a collection of re-recorded DFL songs. In 2011, he released his third album Soul Of The Machine. All albums were released digitally.

DFL has not released new material since [year]. Members are listed as former band members on their official project page.

== Discography ==
=== Albums ===
Year	Title	Label
1999	Dust for Life	Reach Out
2000	Dust for Life	Wind-Up
2003	Degrees of Black	(self-released)
2008	The Consequence of Vanishing	(self-released)

=== Singles ===
Year	Song	U.S. Modern Rock	U.S. Mainstream Rock	Album
2001	"Step Into the Light"	22	16	Dust for Life (Wind-Up)
2001	"Seed"	–	39	Dust for Life (Wind-Up)
2003	"Comedown"	–	–	Degrees of Black
2003	"For You"	–	–	Degrees of Black
2008	"Dark Things Betray"	–	–	The Consequence of Vanishing
2008	"Gold Dust"	–	–	The Consequence of Vanishing
