= Mercy (Steve Jones album) =

Studio album by Steve Jones
- Released: June 1987
- Studio: Cherokee Studios; The Village Recorder; Image Recording Studios; Baby'O Recorders
- Genre: Rock; hard rock
- Length: 47:00
- Label: MCA
- Producer: Bob Rose, Steve Jones, Paul Lani

Steve Jones chronology
| Mercy (1987) | Fire and Gasoline (1989) |

Professional ratings
Review scores
| Source | Rating |
|---|---|
| Allmusic | 2.5/5 stars |
| Kerrang! | 1/5 stars |

Mercy is the first solo album by Steve Jones, formerly of the Sex Pistols. Released in 1987, the album was mainly produced by Bob Rose, with Jones co-producing and Paul Lani producing one track. The recording line-up consisted of Jones on vocals, guitar and bass, keyboardists Bob Rose and Kevin Savigar, and drummers Mickey Curry and Jim Keltner.

The album's single "Mercy" was used in the Miami Vice episode "Stone's War" and was also featured on the Miami Vice II soundtrack album. The song "With You or Without You" was used on the soundtrack for Jonathan Demme's 1986 film Something Wild. The track "Raining in My Heart" was originally recorded as "When Dreaming Fails", a 1985 demo with Iggy Pop recorded at Olivier Ferrand's home studio in Hancock Park, Los Angeles. In 2010 a remastered CD of the album was released by Rock Candy Records.

== Reception ==
Critic Ira Robbins noted that Jones, most famous for his punk rock background, "caught followers off guard" with the release that includes low-key and sentimental songs as well as rock tracks.

== Track listing ==
All tracks are written by Steve Jones, except where noted.

Side one
| No. | Title | Length |
|---|---|---|
| 1. | "Mercy" | 5:04 |
| 2. | "Give It Up" | 4:55 |
| 3. | "That's Enough" | 4:05 |
| 4. | "Raining in My Heart" | 5:33 |
| 5. | "With You or Without You" | 4:29 |

Side two
| No. | Title | Writer(s) | Length |
|---|---|---|---|
| 6. | "Pleasure and Pain" | | 4:51 |
| 7. | "Pretty Baby" | | 6:01 |
| 8. | "Drugs Suck" | | 4:30 |
| 9. | "Through the Night" | | 4:43 |
| 10. | "Love Letters" | Edward Heyman, Victor Young | 2:57 |
| Total length: | | | 47:00 |

== Personnel ==
- Steve Jones – lead vocals, guitars, bass guitar
- Bob Rose – keyboards
- Kevin Savigar – keyboards
- Mickey Curry – drums
- Jim Keltner – drums

Technical

- Bob Rose – producer
- Paul Lani – producer on "Pretty Baby", engineer, mixing on "That's Enough" and "Through the Night"
- Charlie Brocco – assistant engineer
- Cliff Kane – assistant engineer
- Jim Dineen – assistant engineer
- Neil Dorfsman – mixing
- Greg Calbi – engineer, mastering
- Jim Shea – photography
- Michael Diehl – design
- Jeff Adamoff – artwork
