= Neurotic Outsiders (album) =

Studio album by Neurotic Outsiders
- Released: 10 September 1996
- Studio: The Plant Studios, Sausalito; NRG Studios, Los Angeles; Pimp Studios, Los Angeles
- Genre: Punk rock; hard rock
- Length: 44:39
- Label: Maverick
- Producer: Jerry Harrison

Singles from Neurotic Outsiders
- 1. "Jerk" Released: August 1996

Neurotic Outsiders is the only studio album by the British-American rock supergroup Neurotic Outsiders, released on 10 September 1996. The band was formed in 1995 by Steve Jones of the Sex Pistols, Duff McKagan and Matt Sorum of Guns N' Roses, and John Taylor of Duran Duran. Neurotic Outsiders was produced by Jerry Harrison of Talking Heads and recorded across six days. The album was reissued in 2022 with three additional tracks previously included on the 1997 EP Angelina.

== Background and release ==
The band was originally formed by Steve Jones, Duff McKagan, John Taylor and Matt Sorum to play at a benefit at the Viper Room in Los Angeles in June 1995 and later began playing regularly at the venue with friends of the band making guest appearances onstage, including Billy Idol, Iggy Pop, Chrissie Hynde, Ian Astbury and Mel C. Following a growing interest in the band, the members were approached by Guy Oseary of Maverick Records and signed a record deal worth one million dollars. Jerry Harrison was chosen by the band to produce the album, which was recorded in the course of six days. The album's material consisted mainly of songs written by Jones, while the guitarist shared lead vocal duties with McKagan and Taylor. Neurotic Outsiders was released on 10 September 1996. The band briefly toured Europe and North America in support of the album and released the EP Angelina in Japan in 1997, before breaking up due to the members' commitments to other projects.

== Track listing ==
All tracks are written by Steve Jones, except where noted.

No.	Title	Writer(s)	Lead vocals:	Length
1.	"Nasty Ho"		Steve Jones	4:32
2.	"Always Wrong"	John Taylor	Taylor	3:25
3.	"Angelina"		Jones	2:55
4.	"Good News"		Duff McKagan	3:32
5.	"Better Way"	Jones, Taylor	Jones, Taylor	4:22
6.	"Feelings Are Good"	Taylor	Taylor	3:23
7.	"Revolution"		McKagan	3:48
8.	"Jerk"		Jones	4:10
9.	"Union"		Jones	4:29
10.	"Janie Jones"	Joe Strummer, Mick Jones	Taylor	1:53
11.	"Story of My Life"		Jones	4:10
12.	"Six Feet Under"	Jones, McKagan	McKagan	4:00
Total length:				44:39

Expanded edition bonus tracks
No.	Title	Writer(s)	Lead vocals:	Length
13.	"Seattle Head"	Duff McKagan	McKagan	4:22
14.	"Spanish Ballroom"	McKagan, John Taylor, Matt Sorum, Steve Jones		4:02
15.	"Planet Earth"	Simon Le Bon, John Taylor, Roger Taylor, Andy Taylor, Nick Rhodes	Taylor, Jones	3:00
16.	"Jerk" (Clean Version)	Jones	Jones	4:14

== Personnel ==
- Steve Jones – guitar, vocals
- Duff McKagan – guitar, vocals
- Johnny Taylor – bass, vocals
- Matt Sorum – drums, vocals
- Jerry Harrison – production, piano, organ
- Jeff Rougvie – production (reissue)
- Karl Derfler – recording engineer
- Doug McKean – recording engineer (additional), editing (digital)
- Tom Lord-Alge – mixing
- Ted Jensen – mastering
- Ian Blanch – mixing engineer (assistant)
- Mauricio Iragorri – mixing engineer (assistant)
- Wade Norton – recording engineer (assistant)
- Chris Collins – recording engineer (assistant)
- Mike "Sack" Fasano – technician
- Mike "McBob" Mayhue – technician
- Kevin Design Hosmann – art direction
- Guy Oseary – art direction (cover), photography (cover)
- Mario Castellanos – photography (Hollywood street life)
- Anita Camarata – management
