= Brice Armstrong =

American anime voice actor (1936–2020)

Brice Armstrong

Brice Weeks Armstrong Jr (January 3, 1936 – January 10, 2020) was an American voice actor and radio announcer who primarily worked on the properties of Funimation. He was best known as the original narrator of Dragon Ball, as well as Ginyu in Dragon Ball Z, and Slug in the movie Dragon Ball Z: Lord Slug. He was also known for being the voice of Miss Etta Kette in Barney & Friends.

== Filmography ==
=== Anime ===
- Baki the Grappler - Igari Kanji
- Basilisk: The Kōga Ninja Scrolls - Tokugawa Ieyasu
- Blue Gender - Chairman Victor
- Burst Angel - Chief Katsu
- Case Closed - Einstein Achurbee, Gregor, Nick Weldon, Robert Gilmore, Shane O’Connor, Theodore Kinsella, others
- Dragon Ball - Narrator
  - Dragon Ball Z - Ginyu (Remastered)
  - Dragon Ball Z: Lord Slug - Slug
- Fruits Basket - Tohru's Grandfather
- Fullmetal Alchemist - Tim Marcoh
- The Galaxy Railways - Whitman (Ep. 8)
- Lupin the 3rd - Various (Movies & Specials) (FUNimation dub)
- Samurai 7 - Masamune
- Spiral: The Bonds of Reasoning - Raizou Shiranagatani
- Yu Yu Hakusho - Mr. Takanaka, Master Mitamura, Topaz/Kougyoku, Kuroda

=== Video games ===
- Half-Life: Decay (2001) - Richard Keller, HECU Soldiers
- BloodRayne 2 (2004) - Kagan Elite

=== Others ===
- Barney & Friends - Miss Etta Kette
  - It's Time for Counting! - Beauregard

== Death ==
Brice Armstrong died on January 10, 2020, a week after his 84th birthday. He was survived by 6 children and 9 grandchildren.
