= Dragon Ball Z: Cooler's Revenge =

- Theatrical release poster
- Directed by: Mitsuo Hashimoto
- Written by: Takao Koyama
- Based on: Dragon Ball by Akira Toriyama
- Starring: See below
- Cinematography: Masatoshi Fukui
- Edited by: Shin'ichi Fukumitsu
- Music by: Shunsuke Kikuchi
- Production company: Toei Animation
- Distributed by: Toei Company
- Release date: July 20, 1991 (Japan)
- Running time: 47 minutes
- Country: Japan
- Language: Japanese
- Box office: ¥2.38 billion (Japan)

Dragon Ball Z: Cooler's Revenge, known in Japan as Dragon Ball Z: Tobikkiri no Saikyō tai Saikyō (Japanese: ドラゴンボールZ とびっきりの最強対最強; lit. 'Dragon Ball Z: The Outstanding Strongest vs. Strongest'), (Note: Also known by Toei's own English title Dragon Ball Z: The Strongest Rivals.) is a 1991 Japanese anime science fiction martial arts film and the fifth Dragon Ball Z animated feature film, originally released in Japan on July 20 at the Toei Anime Fair. It was preceded by Dragon Ball Z: Lord Slug and followed by Dragon Ball Z: The Return of Cooler. Set in an alternate continuity to the Android Saga, the movie introduces Cooler, the estranged older brother of Frieza, who travels to Earth to challenge Goku and avenge his younger brother's death. The film was first released in theaters in Japan on July 20, 1991. The film also premiered in the Philippines with an English dub produced by Creative Products Corporation on July 11, 1996, as Dragon Ball Z: The Greatest Rivals. The film first aired in the United States on Cartoon Network's Toonami block on September 19, 2003, with an English dub produced by Funimation Productions with the localized title of Cooler's Revenge.

== Plot ==
Cooler watches as his younger brother Frieza destroys the Saiyan home world's Planet Vegeta. His henchmen prepare to destroy a space pod fleeing the doomed planet, transporting a Saiyan infant to Earth. Cooler allows it to go, accounting that it is Frieza's responsibility. More than 20 years later, this Saiyan, Goku, defeats Frieza in Namek's destruction. After learning of his younger brother's death, Cooler takes his men – Salza, Neiz, and Dore- to reclaim his family's honour. On Earth, Cooler's forces ambush Goku and his friends while on a camping trip. Goku is badly wounded when he protects Gohan from Cooler and goes into hiding.

Krillin and Oolong find shelter in a cave with Goku, while Gohan travels to obtain the magic Senzu beans that can heal his father. Cooler orders his men to completely obliterate the forest to locate Goku. After obtaining the beans, Gohan is ambushed by Cooler's men before Piccolo arrives to save him. Piccolo kills Dore and Neiz, but Cooler arrives and incapacitates him. Salza tracks Gohan to the cave and destroys the Senzu. However, Gohan successfully heals Goku with a spare one. Salza quickly defeats Krillin and Gohan, but Goku emerges. Cooler taunts Goku by further injuring Piccolo; Goku incapacitates Salza and attacks Cooler.

After Goku proves to be a worthy opponent, Cooler reveals that he discovered a new and final transformation above Frieza's capabilities. They fight, and Cooler pummels Goku. However, after Goku reflects on the well-being of his loved ones and the danger Cooler poses, he transforms into his Super Saiyan form that defeated Frieza.

Cooler finds himself grossly outclassed by Super Saiyan Goku. He powers up an enormous ki sphere and launches an attack in hopes of destroying Goku and the Earth along with him. After Goku manages to resist and overpower the attack with Kamehameha, he sends it hurdling toward Cooler, who is launched into space and collides with the sun. As he is incinerated, Cooler realises that Goku was the Saiyan infant he spared decades ago. As he laments over his mistake, he is disintegrated.

Drained after his victory, Goku is found by his loved ones. They celebrate and search for Piccolo when Salza reappears and prepares to kill them, but Piccolo kills him, leaving Gohan overjoyed knowing he survived.

== Cast ==
Character name	Voice actor			
Character name	Japanese	English		
Character name	Japanese	Audio Captain Productions/Creative Products Corp. (1996)	Unknown/AB Groupe (c. 2001)	Funimation (2002)
Goku	Masako Nozawa	Nesty Calvo Ramirez	David Gasman	Sean Schemmel
Gohan	Masako Nozawa	E.J. Galang	Jodi Forrest	Stephanie Nadolny
Piccolo	Toshio Furukawa	Ray Buyco	Big Green	Christopher Sabat
Piccolo	Toshio Furukawa	Ray Buyco	Paul Bandey	Christopher Sabat
Kuririn	Mayumi Tanaka	Kririn	Clearin	Krillin
Kuririn	Mayumi Tanaka	Apollo Abraham	Sharon Mann	Sonny Strait
Hire Dragon	Naoki Tatsuta	Baby Camila	Jodi Forrest	Icarus
Hire Dragon	Naoki Tatsuta	Ethel Lizano	Jodi Forrest	Christopher Sabat
Oolong	Naoki Tatsuta	Apollo Abraham	David Gasman	Brad Jackson
Chi-Chi	Naoko Watanabe	Mitch Frankenberger Pelicer	Sharon Mann	Cynthia Cranz
Karin	Ichirō Nagai	Ray Buyco	Paul Bandey	Korin
Karin	Ichirō Nagai	Ray Buyco	Paul Bandey	Christopher Sabat (Note: Despite that Christopher Sabat did lines as Korin in the Funimation dub, Mark Britten is nonetheless credited as Korin; Britten had already left Funimation by the time this film was dubbed. Eric Vale dubbed over one of Korin's lines with different dialogue for the 2008 version of the dub.); Eric Vale (one line, 2008 redub)
Yajirobe	Mayumi Tanaka	Ethel Lizano	Ed Marcus	Mike McFarland
Kame-Sennin	Kōhei Miyauchi	Master Buten	Ed Marcus	Master Roshi
Kame-Sennin	Kōhei Miyauchi	Nesty Calvo Ramirez	Ed Marcus	Mike McFarland
Coola	Ryūsei Nakao	Apollo Abraham	Cooler	
Coola	Ryūsei Nakao	Apollo Abraham	Doug Rand	Andrew Chandler
Sauzer (サウザー, Sauzā)	Shō Hayami	R.J. Celdran	David Gasman	Salza
Sauzer (サウザー, Sauzā)	Shō Hayami	R.J. Celdran	David Gasman	Michael Marco
Naise (ネイズ, Neizu)	Masato Hirano	David Soon	Paul Bandey	Neiz
Naise (ネイズ, Neizu)	Masato Hirano	David Soon	Paul Bandey	Bill Townsley
Doure (ドーレ, Dōre)	Masaharu Satō	Barky	Ed Marcus	Dore
Doure (ドーレ, Dōre)	Masaharu Satō	Manuel R. Abello	Ed Marcus	Mike McFarland
Burdock	Masako Nozawa	Badag	Doug Rand	Bardock
Burdock	Masako Nozawa	Nesty Calvo Ramirez	Doug Rand	Sonny Strait
Freeza	Ryūsei Nakao	Apollo Abraham	Freezer	Frieza
Freeza	Ryūsei Nakao	Apollo Abraham	Ed Marcus	Linda Young
Narrator	Jōji Yanami	Bob Karry	Ed Marcus	Kyle Hebert

=== Cast notes ===
A fourth English version released exclusively in Malaysia by Speedy Video features an unknown voice cast.

== Music ==
- OP (Opening Theme):
  - "Cha-La Head-Cha-La"
    - Lyrics by Yukinojō Mori
    - Music by Chiho Kiyooka
    - Arranged by Kenji Yamamoto
    - Performed by Hironobu Kageyama
- ED (Ending Theme):
  - Tobikkiri no Saikyō tai Saikyō! (とびっきりの最強対最強, "The Incredible Mightiest vs. Mightiest")
    - Lyrics by Dai Satō
    - Music by Chiho Kiyooka
    - Arranged by Kenji Yamamoto
    - Performed by Hironobu Kageyama and Ammy

=== English dub soundtracks ===
The following songs were present in the 2002 Funimation dub of Cooler's Revenge. These songs were removed in later releases due to licensing restrictions.

1. Drowning Pool - "Reminded"
2. Dust for Life - "Poison"
3. American Pearl - "Seven Years"
4. Breaking Point - "Under"
5. Finger Eleven - "Stay and Drown"
6. Breaking Point - "Falling Down"
7. Drowning Pool - "Mute"
8. Disturbed - "The Game"
9. Drowning Pool - "Told You So"
10. Deftones - "Change (In the House of Flies)
11. American Pearl - "Revelation"
12. Breaking Point - "Phoenix"

The Double Feature release contains an alternate audio track containing the English dub with original Japanese background music by Shunsuke Kikuchi and an ending theme of "The Incredible Mightiest vs. Mightiest".

The 1996 dub made by Creative Products contained English versions of the Japanese opening and ending theme songs, performed by Gino Padilla along with a children's chorus known as the Age of Wonder. These songs were featured on the album Dragon Ball • Dragon Ball Z: Songs of a High Spirited Saga - Volume I, along with other English versions of Dragon Ball and Dragon Ball Z songs.

== Releases ==
It was released on DVD and VHS in North America on January 22, 2002. It was later released in Double Feature set along with The Return of Cooler (1992) for Blu-ray and DVD on November 11, 2008, both feature full 1080p format in HD remastered 16:9 aspect ratio and an enhanced 5.1 surround mix. The film was re-released to DVD in remastered thinpak collection on November 1, 2011, containing the first 5 Dragon Ball Z films.

=== Other companies ===
Creative Products Corporation made an English dub for the Philippines, combined with its follow-up film, to make a feature-length film titled Dragon Ball Z: The Greatest Rivals. This feature was released in over 30 Metro Manila theaters on July 11, 1996. Later that year, on November 6, it received an extremely limited VHS release, only sold at Dragon Ball-based promotional events that were hosted by Gino Padilla, who performed the theme music for this version.
