= Fire and Gasoline =

Studio album by Steve Jones
- Released: 1989
- Recorded: 1989
- Studios: Amigo Studios, Los Angeles, California
- Genres: Hard rock; heavy metal
- Length: 49:20
- Label: MCA
- Producers: Mark Dearnley, Ian Astbury

Steve Jones chronology
| Mercy (1987) | Fire and Gasoline (1989) |

Professional ratings
Review scores
| Source | Rating |
|---|---|
| AllMusic | 4/5 stars |

Fire and Gasoline is the second solo album by British musician Steve Jones, formerly of the Sex Pistols. Released in 1989, the album was produced by Mark Dearnley and Ian Astbury, with the latter also contributing vocals, while the recording line-up consisted of Jones, bassist Terry Nails and then-The Cult drummer Mickey Curry. The album featured vocals by Axl Rose of Guns N' Roses on the Sex Pistols cover "I Did U No Wrong", a guitar solo by The Cult guitarist Billy Duffy on "Get Ready" and lyric contributions from Nikki Sixx of Mötley Crüe on "We're Not Saints". Jones toured in support of the album with a live band consisting of guitarists Kirk Hellie and Mike Dimkitch, bassist Nails and drummer Pete Kelly. In 2019, a remastered CD of the album was released by Rock Candy Records that included a cover of David Bowie's 'Suffragette City' as a bonus track.

== Reception ==
In 2005, Fire and Gasoline was ranked number 460 in Rock Hard magazine's book The 500 Greatest Rock & Metal Albums of All Time.

== Track listing ==
All tracks are written by Steve Jones, except where noted.

| No. | Title | Writer(s) | Length |
|---|---|---|---|
| 1. | "Freedom Fighter" | | 5:08 |
| 2. | "We're Not Saints" | Steve Jones, Terry Nails, Nikki Sixx | 3:44 |
| 3. | "God in Louisiana" | Jones, Tonio K | 4:49 |
| 4. | "Fire and Gasoline" | | 4:28 |
| 5. | "Hold On" | | 4:03 |
| 6. | "Trouble Maker" | Angry Anderson, Jones, Gordon Leach, Dallas "Digger" Royal, Peter Wells, Nails | 3:05 |
| 7. | "I Did U No Wrong" | Jones, Glen Matlock, Johnny Rotten, Paul Cook | 3:20 |
| 8. | "Get Ready" | Ian Astbury, Jones | 4:24 |
| 9. | "Gimme Love" | | 4:19 |
| 10. | "Wild Wheels" | | 4:10 |
| 11. | "Leave Your Shoes On" | Astbury, Jones | 4:14 |
| 12. | "Suffragette City" | David Bowie | 3:46 |
| Total length: | | | 49:20 |

== Personnel ==
- Steve Jones – vocals, guitar, background vocals
- Terry Nails – bass, backing vocals
- Ian Astbury – backing vocals, tambourine, vocals on "I Did U No Wrong"
- Mickey Curry – drums
- Billy Duffy – guitar solo on "Get Ready"
- Axl Rose – vocals on "I Did U No Wrong"

Technical

- Mark Dearnley – producer, engineer, mixer
- Ron St. Germain – mixing on "We're No Saints"
- Stephen Marcussen – mastering
- Jeff Adamoff – art direction
- Jeff Katz – photography

== Charts ==
=== Weekly charts ===
Weekly chart performance for Fire and Gasoline
| Chart (1989) | Peak position |
|---|---|
| US Billboard 200 | 169 |
