= The Professionals (The Professionals album) =

Studio album by The Professionals
- Released: 1997 (official); 1991 (bootleg)
- Recorded: 1980
- Genres: Punk rock; power pop
- Length: 37:59 (1997 version)
- Labels: Limited Edition Records (1991); Virgin (1997)
- Producers: Steve Jones, Paul Cook; Mick Glossop, Nigel Gray

The Professionals chronology
I Didn't See It Coming (1981)	The Professionals (1997)	The Best of the Professionals ((2005))

Singles from The Professionals
- 1. "Just Another Dream" Released: Jul 1980; 2. "1-2-3" Released: Sep 1980

The Professionals is the second album of the rock band the Professionals, released in 1997. Recorded as their debut album and scheduled for release in 1980 by Virgin Records, a legal dispute with bassist Andy Allan over unpaid royalties led to the album being scrapped and re-recorded as I Didn't See It Coming.

In 1991, the album was bootlegged by Limited Edition Records, albeit with a slightly different track listing. One song ("Just Another Dream") was omitted, an alternate version of "All the Way" was added, and other tracks were titled incorrectly. Only 1,000 vinyl records and 1,000 CDs were released of this version.

In 1997, Virgin Records officially released the album with the same name, but featuring another different track listing. It left off one song (b-side "Rockin' Mick") and included two songs recorded later ("Join the Professionals" and "Has Anybody Got an Alibi").

== Track listing ==
=== Original LP (1980) ===
All tracks are written by Paul Cook and Steve Jones except where noted.

Side one
No.	Title	Writer(s)	Length
1.	"Little Boys in Blue"		4:16
2.	"Just Another Dream"		3:02
3.	"Mods, Skins, Punks"		3:14
4.	"Kick Down the Doors"		4:13
5.	"Kamikaze"	Cook, Jones, Andy Allan	3:21

Side two
No.	Title	Length
1.	"All the Way with You"	3:22
2.	"Crescendo"	3:48
3.	"1-2-3"	2:56
4.	"Madhouse"	3:09
5.	"Rockin' Mick"

=== Limited Edition Records version (1991) ===
All tracks are written by Paul Cook and Steve Jones except where noted.

No.	Title	Writer(s)	Length
1.	"All the Way"
2.	"Mods, Skins, Punks" (Mislabeled as "Are You?")
3.	"Kick Down the Doors"
4.	"Crescendo"
5.	"Little Boys in Blue"
6.	"Madhouse" (Mislabeled as "Does Anybody Care")
7.	"Kamikaze" (Mislabeled as "Kamikhazi")	Cook, Jones, Allan
8.	"1-2-3"
9.	"Rockin´ Mick" (Mislabeled as "Rockin' Man")
10.	"All the Way (different version)"

=== Virgin Records version (1997) ===
All tracks are written by Paul Cook and Steve Jones except where noted.

No.	Title	Writer(s)	Length
1.	"Little Boys in Blue"		4:16
2.	"Madhouse" (Mislabeled as "Mad House")		3:09
3.	"Just Another Dream"		3:02
4.	"Kamikaze"	Cook, Jones, Allan	3:21
5.	"1-2-3"		2:56
6.	"Crescendo"		3:48
7.	"Mods, Skins, Punks"		3:14
8.	"Join the Professionals"		3:19
9.	"Has Anyone Got an Alibi"		3:19
10.	"All the Way with You"		3:22
11.	"Kick Down the Doors"		4:13

== Personnel ==
The Professionals

- Steve Jones − lead vocals, lead guitar
- Paul Cook − drums, backing vocals
- Andy Allan − bass, backing vocals
- Paul Myers − bass (uncredited), backing vocals on "Join the Professionals" and "Has Anyone Got an Alibi"
- Ray McVeigh − guitar (uncredited), backing vocals on "Join the Professionals" and "Has Anyone Got an Alibi"
- "Gentleman" Jim Macken − handclaps

Technical

- Cook 'n' Jones − production
- Mick Glossop − production and engineering on "Join the Professionals" and "Has Anyone Got an Alibi"
- Nigel Gray − production on "Mad House" and "Kick Down the Doors"
- Bill Price − engineer
- Gary Edwards − engineer
