= Lightning Raiders =

English pub rock band

- Origin: London, England
- Genres: Pub rock, psychedelic rock, punk rock
- Years active: August 1977–1982, 2011–2012
- Labels: Arista, Island
- Past members: John Hodge; Andy Allan; Gass Wild; Duncan Sanderson; Bruce Irvine; George Butler; Tony Mann; Randy Gregg; Fuz

Lightning Raiders were an English pub rock band, with Johnny Hodge being the most prominent member of the group. During their lifetime, they released two singles, an EP, and recorded an album that was not released until 2013.

== Career ==
The Lightning Raiders formed in August 1977 with an original lineup featuring Johnny Hodge (known as Little John) on guitar, Andy Allan on guitar/vocals, ex-Pink Fairies Duncan ('Danger Sun') Sanderson on bass/vocals, Jorge Panchito on drums and Michael Wilding on saxophone.

In February 1978, ex-Pink Fairies drummer/singer Twink released an EP called "Do It '77" with the help of band members Sanderson and Hodge. Twink had already recorded his intended single with his regular band but "Chiswick Records didn't like the track and I jammed "Do It" with the Lightning Raiders, which they preferred." Sanderson recalled, "Twink came round my house and dragged me down the studio while I was still asleep one morning, and Little John Hodge just came along to deliver a guitar. Twink had us jam through "Do It", so we did it. Kid [Rogers (guitar)] and John hadn't even heard the flaming song before. At the end he jumps up and says 'That's it, thanks lads!' We didn't even know it was being taped!" Twink's comment on this was that "A second take of "Do It" is a contradiction in terms." The EP was credited to 'Twink & The Fairies'. The band had a loose membership policy, at one time joining Larry Wallis and Duncan Sanderson onstage as The Pink Fairies with Little John and Jorge Panchito completely unrehearsed to fulfil concert obligations.

=== "Psychedelic Musik" ===
On 31 March 1980, a lineup including Little John on guitar, Andy Allan on Bass, Paul Cook on drums, and Steve Jones on guitar released a 7" single, "Psychedelic Musik", on Arista Records. The two members of the Sex Pistols were never official members of the band - they were repaying a debt to Allan who played bass on the Sex Pistols single, "Silly Thing".

=== "Criminal World" ===
In the next lineup, formed in November 1980, Hodge and Sanderson were joined by Gass Wild on lead vocals (who'd previously drummed with Johnny Thunders and the Chrissie Hynde Band), Bruce Irvine on guitar (previously with Sean Tyla's Tyla Gang), and George Butler (ex-Kilburn and the High Roads) on drums.

In 1981, this lineup put out "Criminal World" with Revenge Records. They then recorded the Will Reid Dick produced 12" EP for Island Records (under the Revenge label), which included the songs "Sweet Revenge", "Rowdies", "Addiction", and "Soul Rescue". This was to be a preview of the forthcoming LP Sweet Revenge, but in December 1981 they were dropped by the label, making the soon deleted EP very rare.

This lineup was popular on the club circuit, playing in various clubs such as Dingwalls, the Marquee Club the Music Machine, The Venue, and many more, often with support from heavy rock trio Killerhertz consisting of Hugo Mallett (guitar) Doug McArthur (bass) and former Chelsea drummer Marc Rathbone. Another support act for the Raiders were long haired glam boys Kitsch (under the same management as the Raiders). Kitsch bass player Paul Raven went on to join London cult band, Killing Joke. The Lightning Raiders along with Killerhertz and former Raider Andy Allan, performed at the 1981 Stonehenge Free Festival. Little John went on to record briefly with Chelsea and play live with Lena Zavaroni in her father's Kilburn pub.

Hodge left the band in February 1982, though the remaining members continued for a time. Duncan Sanderson and George Butler played with Larry Wallis in a series of bands during the early 1980s, until the reformation of the Pink Fairies and, later, The Deviants at which point George Butler was replaced by Russell Hunter (original Pink Fairy/Deviant). Little John Hodge recorded and performed with Bert Jansch for the latter's album, Edge of a Dream, which included the Hodge song "La Luna" inspired by Aleister Crowley. Jansch repaid the favour by appearing on Hodge's solo CD La Luna as second guitarist on a number of tracks.

=== Sweet Revenge ===
The 2013, a truncated version of the Lighting Raiders 'lost' album, Sweet Revenge was released. On August 7, 2026, a limited remastered 12" vinyl edition of 150 copies was announced for a September 11th release, featuring seven tracks from Sweet Revenge and three previously unreleased songs ("Acid Punch", "Another Raid", and "Bin 'N' Gone").

== NYC reunion / Lost Rockers ==
In 2009, Hodge visited New York to reunite with Gass Wild for two 'Lightning Raiders' reunion shows with guest American musicians, to promote a forthcoming documentary and book Lost Rockers. In the film Lemmy of Motörhead praises the band.

== Present day ==
Johnny Hodge died at home in Camden Town in 2012, George Butler and Duncan Sanderson have both died too. Andy Allan has been active playing with folk combo Hank Dogs, releasing two CDs and touring with Joan Baez. Gass Wild fronts a NYC band called The Love Pirates (a name borrowed from the Larry Wallis band of the 1980s 'Love Pirates of Doom').

== Members ==
Early line-up

- "Little" John Hodge – lead guitar
- Andy Allan – rhythm guitar, lead vocals
- Duncan Sanderson – bass, backing vocals
- Jorge Panchito – drums, percussion
- Michael Wilding - sax

"Psychedelic Musik" line-up

- "Little" John Hodge – guitar, backing vocals
- Andy Allan – bass, lead vocals
- Steve Jones – guitar
- Paul Cook – drums, percussion

1980-1982 line-up

- John Hodge – lead guitar
- Gass Wild – lead vocals
- Duncan Sanderson – bass, backing vocals
- Bruce Irvine - rhythm guitar
- George Butler – drums, percussion

2011-2012 line-up

- Johnny Hodge – lead guitar
- Gass Wild – lead vocals
- Randy Gregg – bass
- Fuz - rhythm guitar
- Tony Mann – drums, percussion

== Discography ==
LP

- 2013 – Sweet Revenge (Rock Candy Records CANDY 135) (Originally recorded in 1980-1981.)
- 2026 – Lightning Raiders (Old Guarde Records) (Originally recorded in 1981.)

Singles and EP

- 1980 – "Psychedelic Musik" b/w "Views" (Arista 341)
- 1981 – "Criminal World" b/w "Citizens" (Revenge Records REVS 200)
- 1981 – Sweet Revenge EP : "Sweet Revenge" / "Rowdies" / "Addiction" / "Soul Rescue"(Revenge Records RSS 39)

Compilations

- 1980 – "Views" live track on The Moonlight Tapes compilation. (Danceville Records D1)
- 1997 – "Sweet Revenge" bonus track on Son of Ham compilation. (UHCK 002)
- 1997 – "Addiction" and "Rowdies" on Hogwatch - For a Few Rashers More compilation. (UHCK 003)
- 2009 – "Didja" on Punks from the Underground compilation. (Skydog Records 62243-2)
