= Dragon Ball Z: Lord Slug =

- Theatrical release poster

Japanese name
- Kana: ドラゴンボールZ 超(スーパー)サイヤ人だ孫悟空
Transcriptions
- Revised Hepburn: Doragon Bōru Zetto Sūpā Saiyajin da Son Gokū
- Directed by: Mitsuo Hashimoto
- Written by: Takao Koyama
- Screenplay by: Takao Koyama
- Based on: Dragon Ball by Akira Toriyama
- Starring: See below
- Cinematography: Masaru Sakanishi; Motoi Takahashi
- Edited by: Shin'ichi Fukumitsu
- Music by: Shunsuke Kikuchi
- Production company: Toei Animation
- Distributed by: Toei Company
- Release date: March 9, 1991 (Japan)
- Running time: 52 minutes
- Country: Japan
- Language: Japanese
- Box office: ¥2.21 billion ($16.4 million)

Dragon Ball Z: Lord Slug, known in Japan as Dragon Ball Z: Super Saiyan Son Goku (Japanese: ドラゴンボールZ 超(スーパー)サイヤ人だ孫悟空, Hepburn: Doragon Bōru Zetto Sūpā Saiyajin da Son Gokū), is a 1991 Japanese animated science fiction martial arts film and the fourth Dragon Ball Z feature film. It was originally released in Japan on March 9 at the Toei Anime Fair as part of a double feature with the first Magical Taruruto-kun film. It was preceded by Dragon Ball Z: The Tree of Might and followed by Dragon Ball Z: Cooler's Revenge. The film first aired in the United States on Cartoon Network's Toonami block on April 24, 2004, with an English dub produced by Funimation Productions with the localized title of Lord Slug.

== Plot ==
Gohan visits Piccolo and shows him a new tune he has learned to whistle. Due to his advanced Namekian hearing, this causes Piccolo pain; he angrily orders Gohan to stop when they both sense an approaching threat from outer space. Bulma and her father discover that a meteor harboring lifeforms is heading toward the Earth and will destroy the planet upon impact. Amidst mass panic, Goku and Krillin rush to intercept the meteor and hope to push it away by blasting it with ki, but they are both rendered unconscious by the force of the meteor, and it seemingly explodes in orbit. A spaceship then lands in one of Earth's cities.

An army of humanoid alien soldiers exits the ship and declares the Earth under the rule of their leader, Lord Slug. The soldiers attack a group of civilians, but Gohan arrives to defend them. Lord Slug observes that Gohan has a magical Dragon Ball sewn onto his hat, which he loses during the scuffle. After his henchmen render Gohan unconscious and reveal the plan to convert the planet into a biological spaceship, Slug appears and uses telepathy to read Bulma's mind; he learns about her radar used for tracking the Dragon Balls. Slug's men successfully gather the Dragon Balls and summon the eternal dragon Shenron, who grants Slug eternal youth. Meanwhile, life on Earth begins to perish.

Goku and Krillin are revived by Yajirobe. Gohan, meanwhile, resumes his assault against Slug's army; he is nearly killed but is rescued by Piccolo. Piccolo kills the henchman Wings, while Gohan is overwhelmed by Medamatcha. Piccolo is injured when he jumps before a ki blast intended to kill Gohan. Goku and Krillin arrive, and Goku quickly kills Medamatcha and Angila. Slug appears and is attacked by Krillin, who is quickly defeated. Goku fights Slug but is overwhelmed; in a moment of rage, Goku seemingly turns into a Super Saiyan. (Note: Retroactively referred to as False Super Saiyan, or Pseudo Super Saiyan, as Lord Slug released before the Frieza saga of the Manga.)

During the battle, Slug reveals his Namekian heritage. Through telepathy, King Kai warns Goku that Slug is a "Super Namekian", a bloodline of violent warriors obsessed with power. Slug assumes a giant form and crushes Goku between his massive hands. Piccolo intervenes to rescue Goku, and before he is crushed, he tears off his ears and calls out for Gohan to start whistling. The whistling deafens and weakens Slug, allowing Piccolo to transfer his remaining ki to Goku, who powers up and manages to fly straight through Slug's abdomen and incapacitates him. Goku ascends into the sky and prepares a Spirit Bomb. Goku launches the ki bomb at Slug, which sends him hurtling into his machines, killing him and saving the planet.

== Cast ==
| Character name | Voice actor | | |
| Character name | Japanese | English | |
| Character name | Japanese | Funimation (2001) | Unknown/AB Groupe (c. 2001) |
|---|---|---|---|
| Goku | Masako Nozawa | Sean Schemmel | David Gasman |
| Gohan | Masako Nozawa | Stephanie Nadolny | Jodi Forrest |
| Piccolo | Toshio Furukawa | Christopher Sabat | Big Green |
| Piccolo | Toshio Furukawa | Christopher Sabat | Paul Bandey |
| Krillin | Mayumi Tanaka | Sonny Strait | Clearin |
| Krillin | Mayumi Tanaka | Sonny Strait | Sharon Mann |
| Slug (スラッグ, Suraggu) | Kenji Utsumi (old); Yusaku Yara (young) | Brice Armstrong | Slag |
| Slug (スラッグ, Suraggu) | Kenji Utsumi (old); Yusaku Yara (young) | Brice Armstrong | Ed Marcus |
| Commander Zeeun (ゼエウン, Zeeun) | Kōji Totani | Brad Jackson | Paul Bandey |
| Angira (アンギラ) | Keiichi Nanba | Angila | Paul Bandey |
| Angira (アンギラ) | Keiichi Nanba | John Burgmeier | Paul Bandey |
| Dorodabo (ドロダボ) | Daisuke Gōri | Wings | David Gasman |
| Dorodabo (ドロダボ) | Daisuke Gōri | Chris Rager | David Gasman |
| Medamatcha (メダマッチャ, Medamaccha) | Yukitoshi Hori | Kent Williams | Doug Rand |
| Gyoshu (ギョーシュ, Gyōshu) | Shigeru Chiba | Sonny Strait | Doug Rand |
| Kakuja (カクージャ, Kakūja) | Shōzō Iizuka | Christopher Sabat | Doug Rand |
| Footsoldiers | Shinobu Satouchi; Hikaru Midorikawa; Michio Nakao | Kyle Hebert; Brian Thomas; Brad Jackson; Mike McFarland; Chuck Huber; Monika Antonelli | David Gasman; Ed Marcus; Paul Bandey; Doug Rand |
| Bulma | Hiromi Tsuru | Tiffany Vollmer | Bloomer |
| Bulma | Hiromi Tsuru | Tiffany Vollmer | Sharon Mann |
| Shenlong | Kenji Utsumi | Shenron | Sacred Dragon |
| Shenlong | Kenji Utsumi | Christopher Sabat | Ed Marcus |
| Dr. Brief | Jōji Yanami | Dr. Briefs | Paul Bandey |
| Dr. Brief | Jōji Yanami | Chris Forbis | Paul Bandey |
| Chi-Chi | Naoko Watanabe | Cynthia Cranz | Sharon Mann |
| Kaiō | Jōji Yanami | King Kai | Paul Bandey |
| Kaiō | Jōji Yanami | Sean Schemmel | Paul Bandey |
| Oolong | Naoki Tatsuta | Brad Jackson | David Gasman |
| Yajirobe | Mayumi Tanaka | Mike McFarland | Ed Marcus |
| Kame-Sennin | Kōhei Miyauchi | Master Roshi | Ed Marcus |
| Kame-Sennin | Kōhei Miyauchi | Mike McFarland | Ed Marcus |
| Narrator | Jōji Yanami | Kyle Hebert | Ed Marcus |

== Music ==
- OP (Opening Theme):
  - "Cha-La Head-Cha-La"
    - Lyrics by Yukinojō Mori
    - Music by Chiho Kiyooka
    - Arranged by Kenji Yamamoto
    - Performed by Hironobu Kageyama
- IN (Insert Song):
  - Kuchibue no Kimochi (口笛の気持ち, "The Feeling of Whistling")
    - Lyrics by Dai Satō
    - Music by Chiho Kiyooka
    - Arranged by Kenji Yamamoto
    - Whistling by Hajime Ueshiba (also known as Hajime Kamishiba)
- ED (Ending Theme):
  - "Ya" na Koto ni wa Genki-Dama!! (「ヤ」なことには 元気玉!!, "There's a Genki-Dama in Bad Things!!")
    - Lyrics by Dai Satō
    - Music by Takeshi Ike
    - Arranged by Kenji Yamamoto
    - Performed by Hironobu Kageyama with Shines

=== English dub soundtrack ===
The following songs appeared in Funimation's in-house English dub of Lord Slug. These songs were removed in later releases due to licensing restrictions.

- Finger Eleven - "First Time"
- Dust for Life - "Dragonfly"
- Dust for Life - "Step Into the Light"
- American Pearl - "Free Your Mind"
- Deftones - "Elite"
- Boy Hits Car - "I'm a Cloud"
- Finger Eleven - "Drag You Down"
- Dust for Life - "Seed"
- American Pearl - "Automatic"
- Disturbed - "Fear"
- Boy Hits Car - "The Rebirth"
- Disturbed - "Stupify"
- Breaking Point - "Coming of Age"

Bruce Faulconer produced an alternate opening theme for this version (which would be replaced in the 2008 remastered version with another original track composed by Mark Menza) and the remaining pieces of background music were composed by Faulconer and Evan Jones. The Double Feature release contains an alternate audio track containing the English dub with original Japanese background music by Shunsuke Kikuchi, an opening theme of "Cha-La Head-Cha-La", and an ending theme of "There's a Genki-Dama in Bad Things!!".

== Box office ==
At the Japanese box office, the film sold 3.6 million tickets and grossed ¥2.21 billion ($16.4 million).

== Releases ==
It was released on VHS in North America on August 7, 2001, and on DVD on September 4, 2001. It was later released in Double Feature set along with The Tree of Might (1990) for Blu-ray and DVD on September 16, 2008, both feature full 1080p format in HD remastered 16:9 aspect ratio and an enhanced 5.1 surround mix. The film was re-released to DVD in remastered thinpak collection on November 1, 2011, containing the first 5 Dragon Ball Z films.

=== International versions ===
A third English version produced and released exclusively in Malaysia by Speedy Video, features an unknown voice cast.

Other English dubs were also made by French company AB Groupe. This company done for European markets which was released and aired under the title Super Saiya Son Goku on June 2, 2005 on Toonami, and another one for a Malaysian VCD release by Speedy Video which had the title Super Saiya People, Goku. While the Malaysian dub's cast remains unknown, the AB Groupe dub was revealed to have been recorded by English-speaking actors based in France who have also done voices for animated television series such as Code Lyoko and Chris Colorado.

== Reception ==
In a retrospective review for Anime UK News, the reviewer highlighted the film's early depiction of Goku approaching a Super Saiyan transformation as its most notable feature, but criticised the story for closely reworking elements of the King Piccolo storyline from Dragon Ball.
