= Neurotic Outsiders =

British-American rock supergroup

Background information
- Genres: Punk rock, hard rock
- Years active: 1995–1997 (Reunions: 1999, 2006)
- Labels: Maverick; Warner Bros.
- Past members: Duff McKagan; Matt Sorum; Billy Idol; Steve Stevens; Steve Jones; John Taylor

Neurotic Outsiders was a British-American rock supergroup founded in 1995, consisting of Steve Jones of the Sex Pistols, Matt Sorum and Duff McKagan of Guns N' Roses, and John Taylor of Duran Duran. The first line-up featured Billy Idol and Steve Stevens, together with McKagan and Sorum, but they were soon replaced by Jones and Taylor.

Originally a gathering of friends jamming together at the Viper Room in Los Angeles, the band released one eponymous album on Maverick Records in September 1996, and briefly toured Europe and North America. The band broke up in 1997 due to the members' commitments to other projects, but reunited briefly in April 1999 for three shows at the Viper Room.

== History ==
Neurotic Outsiders was formed when Matt Sorum recruited Steve Jones, Duff McKagan and John Taylor to play at a benefit at the Viper Room in Los Angeles in June 1995. The lineup soon began playing regularly at the venue, while friends of the band made guest appearances onstage, including Billy Idol, Iggy Pop, Chrissie Hynde, Ian Astbury and Mel C. The band was originally named Neurotic Boy Outsiders after an article in The Guardian that Taylor had read in the 1970s, but "Boy" was dropped from the name at the request of Sorum and McKagan. Following growing interest from music executives, the band was signed to Maverick Records and given one million dollars to record an album.

The band chose Jerry Harrison to produce the album, which was recorded in California during the course of six days. A majority of the album's songs were written by Jones, while lead vocals were shared between Jones, Taylor and McKagan. The band's self-titled album was released on 10 September 1996. The album was met with little fanfare, while critics deemed the band "pure Hollywood, honestly and comfortably vulgar" and praised their musicianship. The band went on tour in support of the album through Europe and North America, but ceased to exist due to Jones participating in the Sex Pistols' reunion and McKagan focusing on Guns N' Roses. Their final release was the EP Angelina in 1997. Neurotic Outsiders reunited in 1999 for three shows at the Viper Room.

== Former members ==
Final lineup

- Steve Jones – guitar, lead and backing vocals
- Duff McKagan – guitar, backing and lead vocals, bass
- Matt Sorum – drums, backing vocals
- John Taylor – bass, backing and lead vocals

Previous members

- Billy Idol – lead vocals (1995)
- Steve Stevens – guitar (1995)

== Discography ==
Studio albums

- Neurotic Outsiders (1996)

Studio Singles & EPs

- Jerk (1996) US Modern Rock #3
- Angelina (1997)
