= Steve Jones (musician) =

English guitarist (born 1955)

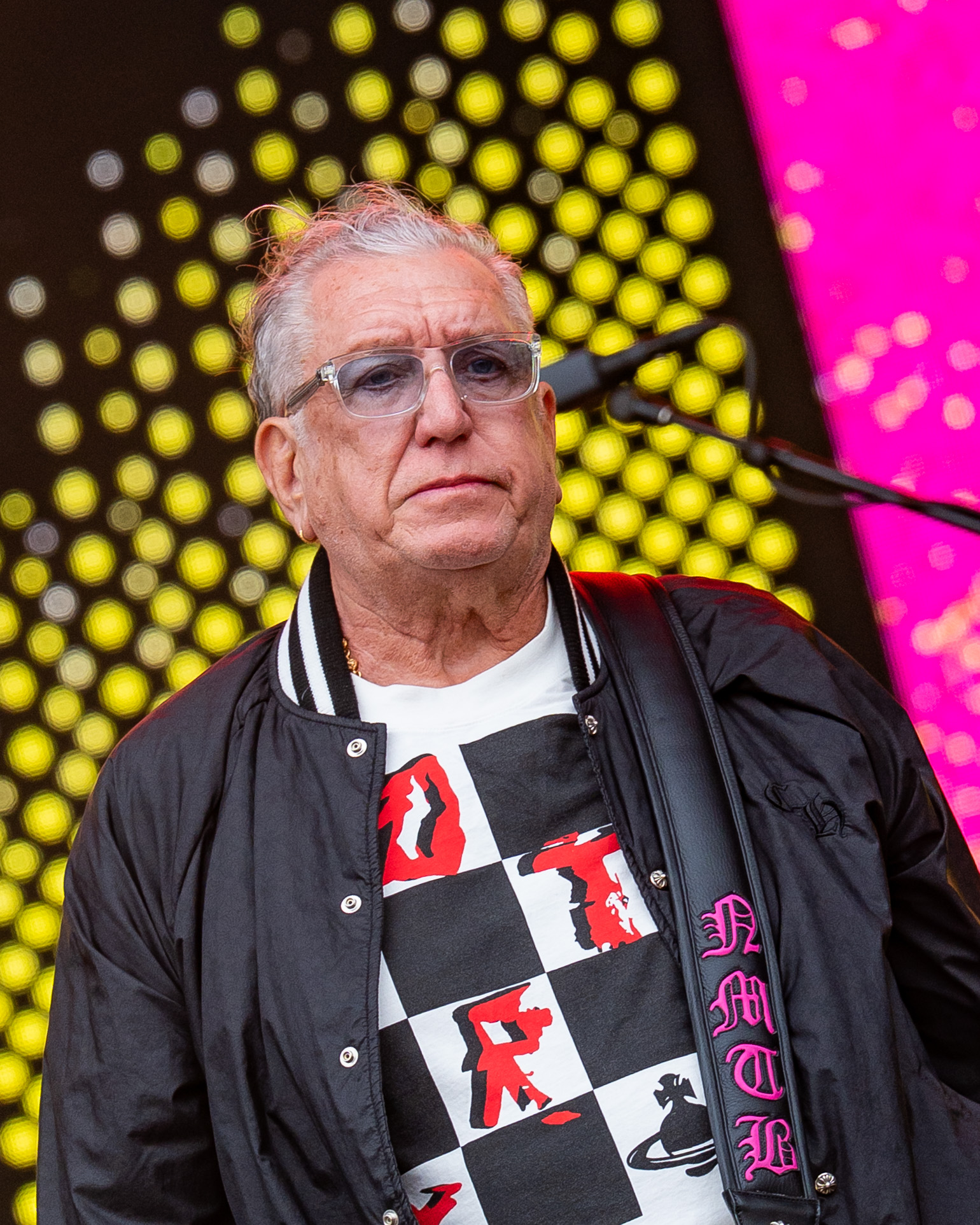
- Jones with Sex Pistols & Frank Carter in 2025

Background information
- Born: Stephen Philip Jones; 3 September 1955 (age 71); Shepherd's Bush, London, England
- Origin: Hammersmith, London, England
- Genres: Punk rock; hard rock; heavy metal
- Occupations: Musician; songwriter
- Instruments: Guitar; vocals
- Years active: 1972–present
- Labels: Virgin; MCA; Warner Bros.
- Member of: Sex Pistols; Generation Sex
- Formerly of: the Professionals; Chequered Past; Fantasy 7; Neurotic Outsiders; Sham Pistols
- Website: jonesysjukebox.com

Stephen Philip Jones (born 3 September 1955) is an English guitarist, best known as a member of the punk band Sex Pistols. Following the split of the Sex Pistols, he formed the Professionals with former bandmate Paul Cook. He has released two solo albums, and worked with Johnny Thunders, Iggy Pop, Cheap Trick, Bob Dylan and Thin Lizzy.

In 1995, he formed the short-lived supergroup Neurotic Outsiders with members of Guns N' Roses and Duran Duran. Jones was ranked No. 97 in Rolling Stone's 2015 list of the "100 Greatest Guitarists of All Time".

== Early life ==
Jones was born in Shepherd's Bush, London, where he grew up with his young mother, who worked as a hairdresser, and his grandparents. He first moved to Benbow Road in Shepherd's Bush and then to Nine Elms in Battersea. Jones befriended future bandmate Paul Cook in his childhood. He was an only child and his father, Don Jarvis, a professional boxer, left when he was two years old. He revealed in his 2016 autobiography Lonely Boy that he was sexually abused by his stepfather, Ron Dambagella, which he blamed for his later sex addiction and inability to form lasting relationships.

He was a student at the Christopher Wren School, now Phoenix High School, London in White City Estate, Shepherd's Bush, though he rarely attended. He revealed that he was functionally illiterate until he was in his 40s. With 14 criminal convictions, he was the subject of a council-care order and spent a year in a remand centre, which he said was more enjoyable than being at home. Jones has said that the Sex Pistols saved him from a life of crime.

== Career ==
=== 1970s ===
Jones co-founded The Strand (named after a Roxy Music song) with Paul Cook and Wally Nightingale in the early 1970s but later changed its name to The Swankers. After the band dropped Nightingale in August 1975 they reformed as the Sex Pistols with Jones, Cook, Glen Matlock, and John Lydon. Jones was the oldest member of the band.

In October 1976, Jones was filmed as an extra in the movie The Squeeze, released in 1977.

Jones is a self-taught guitar player, primarily playing Gibson Les Paul electric guitars in his early years. He had allegedly only been playing for three months before his first Sex Pistols gig, and has said that practising under the influence of black beauties helped him focus well on learning the instrument.

His usual guitar was a cream-coloured Gibson Les Paul Custom which Malcolm McLaren had acquired from Sylvain Sylvain of The New York Dolls. According to the Sex Pistols documentary The Filth and the Fury, he had stolen equipment from a truck parked behind the Hammersmith Odeon where David Bowie was playing the Ziggy Farewell concerts, when he and some of his friends posed as road-crew members, stealing amplifiers and other equipment.

Due to bassist Sid Vicious's musical incompetence, Jones played the primary bass-guitar parts for "Bodies" and "Holidays in the Sun" on Never Mind the Bollocks (a part played by Vicious is buried in the mix on "Bodies" and Matlock appears on the other songs as they had previously been recorded as singles and B-sides).

When the Sex Pistols were interviewed by Bill Grundy on the Thames Television's local news Today programme on 1 December 1976, Jones swore at Grundy after being goaded to do so, catalyzing the notoriety of the band.

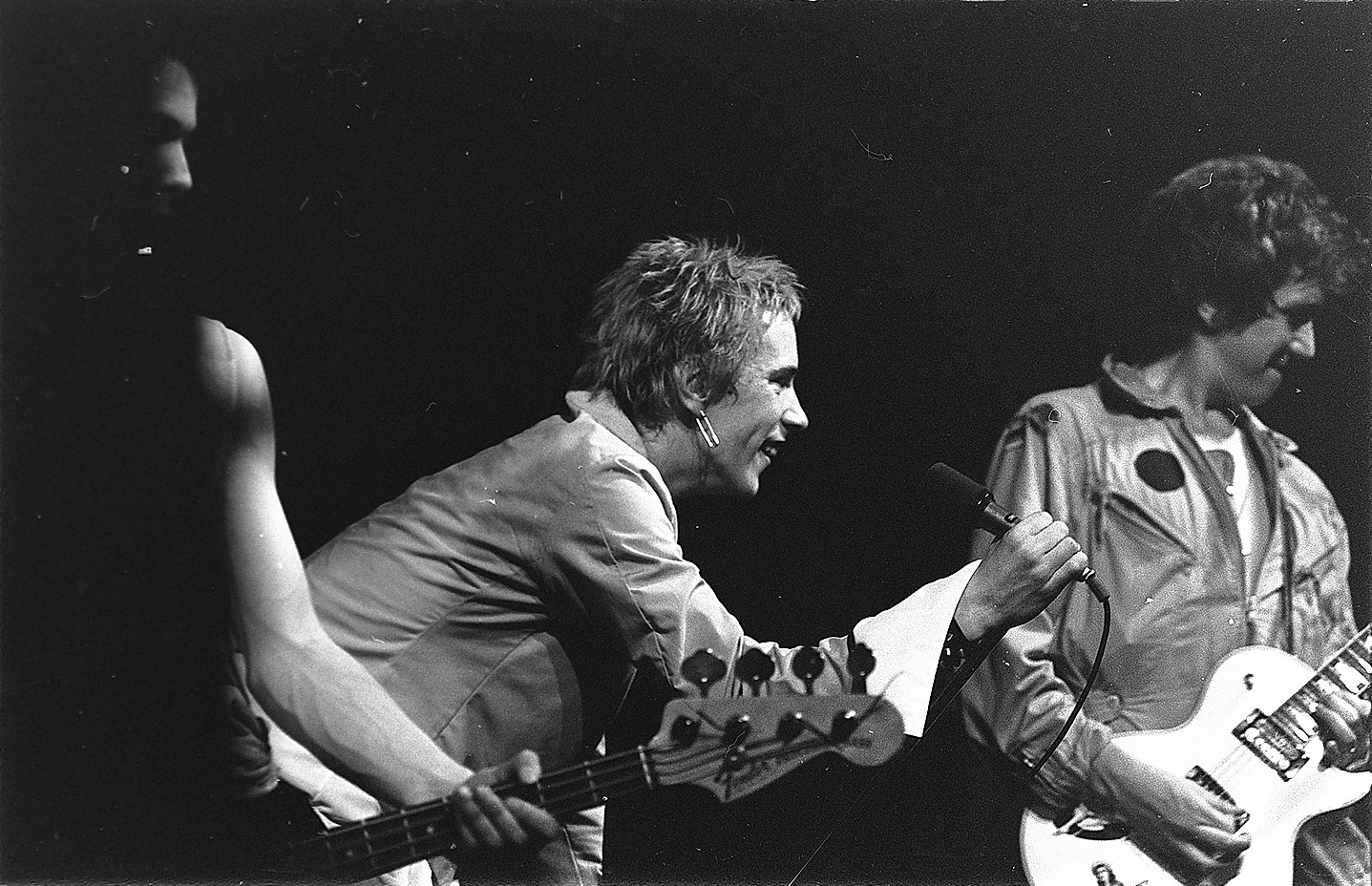
Jones (right) with the Sex Pistols in 1977

After the Sex Pistols broke up in 1978, Jones and drummer Paul Cook co-founded the Professionals. They released four singles, recorded a self-titled LP that was shelved until 1990, and released I Didn't See It Coming in November 1981. The band's American tour to promote the album was cut short when band members Paul Cook, Paul Myers, and Ray McVeigh were injured in a car accident. While the Professionals did return to America in the spring of 1982 after recovery, Jones's and Myers's drug problems further hampered the band's prospects. They declined an opening spot offer on tour for The Clash, and broke up.

=== 1980s ===
Jones was a member of Chequered Past (led by Michael Des Barres) from 1982 to 1985. They released a self-titled album in 1984. Jones performed alongside Sex Pistols bandmate Paul Cook on Johnny Thunders' solo album So Alone. Siouxsie and the Banshees thought for a while to engage Jones after the departure of two of their original members. Rehearsals took place in early 1980, and Jones recorded the guitars parts on three songs of the album Kaleidoscope. The experience did not go further than a simple recording session.

Jones played with Thin Lizzy, Billy Idol, Joan Jett, Kraut, Adam Ant, Bob Dylan, Iggy Pop, Andy Taylor, the Danko Jones Band Neurotic Outsiders, and had a solo career in the 1980s and early 1990s. His song "Mercy", from the album of the same name, was used in a Miami Vice episode called "Stone's War" and was featured on the Miami Vice II soundtrack album and in the film Homeboy 1988. "Pleasure and Pain", also from the album Mercy, was included in the 1986 film Sid and Nancy, a biopic of Jones's Sex Pistols bandmate Sid Vicious. In 1989, he released his second solo album, titled Fire and Gasoline, which featured Jones on guitar and vocals, Terry Nails on bass, and drummer Mickey Curry. Jones was a guest star in an episode of the television sitcom Roseanne. He had previously played a private detective in The Great Rock 'n' Roll Swindle, and had a role in the 1981 film, Ladies and Gentlemen, The Fabulous Stains.

=== 1990s ===
In 1991 a project called Fantasy 7 (known as F7) was recorded, and remains officially unreleased. They toured locally in Los Angeles and a few shows in South America featuring singer Mark McCoy. In 1995, Jones played guitar on the self-titled and only album released by the band P, who featured Gibby Haynes of the Butthole Surfers and actor Johnny Depp.

In 1996, Jones formed Neurotic Outsiders, that featured himself on guitar and vocals, former Guns N' Roses members Duff McKagan and Matt Sorum on rhythm guitar and drums, and John Taylor from Duran Duran, on bass. They released a self-titled album in 1996. Also in 1996, he played guitar on most of the tracks for Cyco Miko's Lost My Brain! (Once Again).

He played with Andy Taylor, guitarist of Duran Duran, by touring with the Power Station in the 1990s. Also in 1996, recorded guitar tracks for The Great Milenko, an album by Insane Clown Posse. Jones produced the self-titled debut albums of the Los Angeles-based Buckcherry and American Pearl, released in 1999 and 2000.

=== 2000s ===
He participated in the Sex Pistols reunion concerts and currently resides in Los Angeles. He has since engaged in session work, playing guitar on Lisa Marie Presley's 2005 album, Now What. Jones played lead guitar on two tracks. "Here Today, Gone Tomorrow" which was originally recorded for the Ramones tribute album We're a Happy Family but only appeared as a hidden track on Now What.

The Sex Pistols, including Jones, played a gig for the 30th anniversary of Never Mind the Bollocks, Here's the Sex Pistols at the Brixton Academy on 8 November 2007. Due to popular demand, four further gigs were added for the subsequent days, making five in total. A further gig in Brixton on 12 November was followed by one at the MEN Arena in Manchester on 17 November. The Glasgow S.E.C.C on 18 November completed the tour. In 2008, he played guitar on four songs on the David Byrne & Brian Eno collaboration, Everything That Happens Will Happen Today.

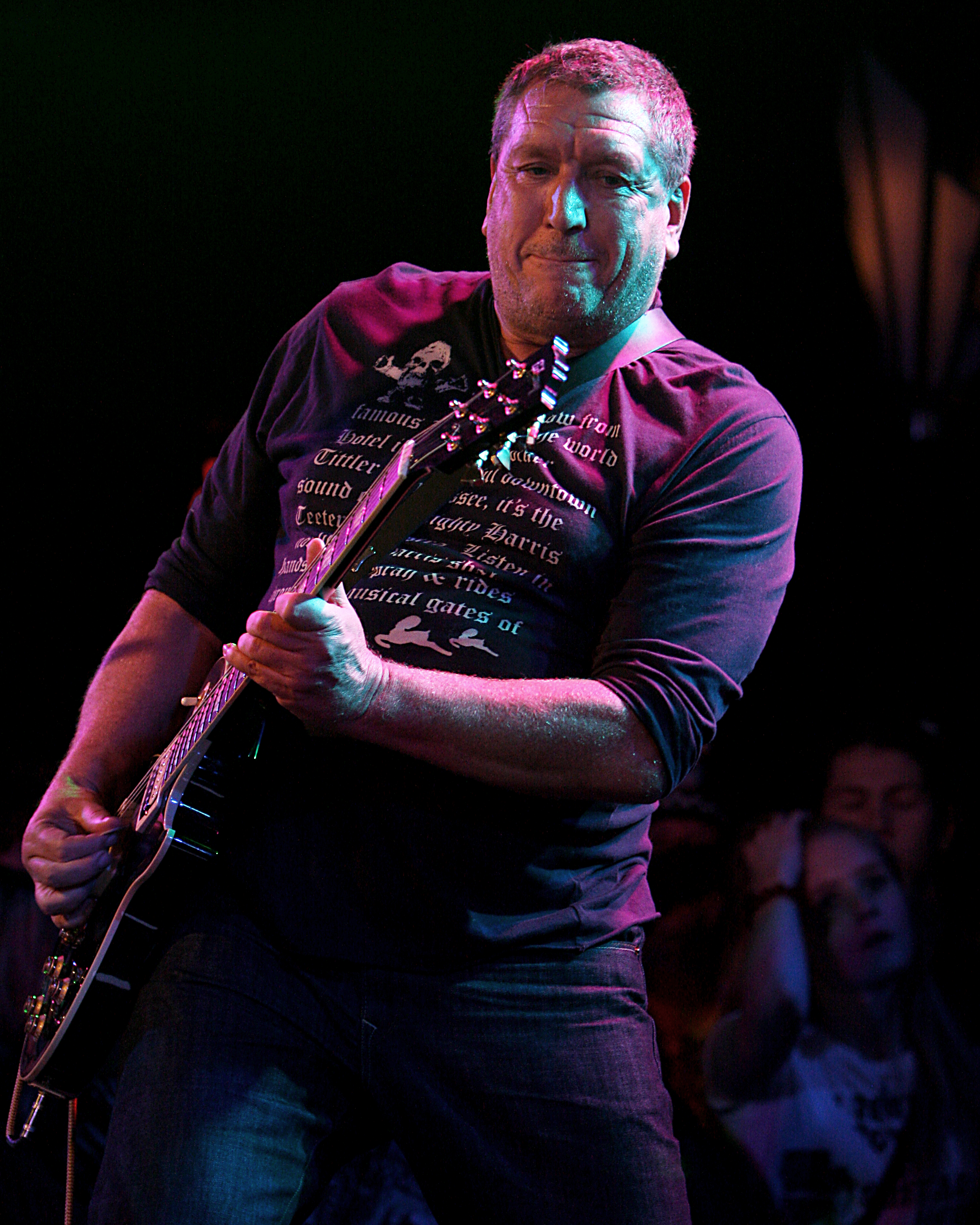
Jones performing with Camp Freddy in 2008.

Jones has recently played with Hollywood United F.C., an American amateur soccer team based in Los Angeles, made up mainly of celebrities and former professional footballers. In 2008, the Sex Pistols appeared at the Isle of Wight Festival as the headlining act on the Saturday night, the Peace & Love festival in Sweden, and the Live at Loch Lomond festival in Scotland.

=== 2010s ===
Jones made a cameo appearance on Portlandia's second-season finale, "Brunch Village", which aired on 9 March 2012. In May 2012, Jones appeared on The Late Late Show with Craig Ferguson in a sketch playing himself as the roommate to Prince Charles (played by Craig Ferguson), as well as playing guitar on a cover of Ninian Hawick's "Scottish Rite Temple Stomp" in a cold open to a week of shows shot in Scotland. He later appeared on Ferguson's last show in December 2014, playing guitar during a rendition of Dead Man Fall's "Bang Your Drum."

Jones was ranked 97th in Rolling Stone's list of the "100 Greatest Guitarists of All Time". After an appearance as the guest on Russell Brand's FX television program Brand X with Russell Brand in 2013, Jones assumed the duties of the house band on that program. He performed solo on the electric guitar. In 2013 and 2014, Jones appeared as recurring character "Krull" during the sixth and seventh seasons of Showtime television series Californication, playing the road manager of Tim Minchin's character Atticus Fetch.

== Equipment ==
While with the Sex Pistols, Jones mostly played two Gibson Les Paul Customs, a black 1957 Gibson Les Paul Custom and his most famous white 1974 Gibson Les Paul Custom (with the pin-up girls on it) that formerly belonged to Sylvain Sylvain of the New York Dolls. In the late '90s, Jones was offered free Burny Les Paul Customs, straps, picks and cables if he played their guitar. They made two models for him which he used on the 2002–2003 North American Piss Off Tour. At around 2005 he went back to using Gibsons, but has still been seen playing his Burny. In 2008, Gibson put out a "Steve Jones Signature Les Paul Model" to the exact specs of his original white 1974 Les Paul Custom.

While Jones typically, since the 1980s, plays through Marshall JCM 800 Stacks, he used a silverface Fender Twin Reverb (reportedly stolen from Bob Marley at the Hammersmith Apollo) with Gauss speakers to record Never Mind The Bollocks. He also used Musicman Amps and a Fender Super Reverb during the 1978 US Tour.

Jones also plays Hamer Sunburst double-cut guitars, and prefers the White Les Paul Custom as his primary guitar.

== Jonesy's Jukebox ==
In February 2004, Jones began hosting a daily radio program in Los Angeles, called Jonesy's Jukebox, on Indie 103.1 FM, where he could do whatever he wanted (within FCC rules), with no direction from station management. Jones mixed an eclectic playlist with rambling and often humorous interviews of guests from the entertainment industry. He kept an acoustic guitar in the studio and frequently performed stream of consciousness songs about the current topic of discussion. Notable guests included Eddie Vedder, Chrissie Hynde, Johnny Ramone, Billy Corgan, Susanna Hoffs, Leif Garrett, Brian Wilson, Pete Townshend, Iggy Pop, Josh Homme, Robert Plant, Gary Oldman, Corey Taylor and Johnny Rotten.

Indie 103.1's last broadcast of Jonesy's Jukebox was on 14 January 2009. Indie 103.1 ceased to exist as a broadcast-radio station on 15 January 2009. In November 2009, he guested on BBC Radio's 6Music with five Sunday shows, titled A Month of Sundays with Steve Jones, playing a mix of tunes from his childhood through to the current day. In December 2009, the show was revived and ran via internet radio on IAmRogue.com, a website run by producer Ryan Kavanaugh. This incarnation of the show ended in late March 2010. Jones was picked up by LA radio Station, KROQ, in October 2010 to continue his Jonesy's Jukebox segment. Jones's last show on KROQ was March 2013.

Jonesy's Jukebox returned to the radio in late 2015 on 95.5 KLOS in Los Angeles. Starting 1 January 2016, the show expanded to five days a week, Monday to Friday. KLOS is a mainstream classic rock station featuring bands like Van Halen, Aerosmith and Pink Floyd. Guests on the show often reflect the KLOS format and have included Paul Cook, Lars Ulrich, Dave Mustaine, Simple Minds, Paul Stanley, Dave Vanian, Captain Sensible, Danny Trejo, Puddles Pity Party, Midge Ure, Ozzy Osbourne, Slash, Gary Oldman, Johnny Depp, Lenny Kravitz, Judas Priest, Yes, Juliette Lewis, Bill Burr, Mike Tramp, The Zombies, Brian May, Jack Black, David Coverdale, Rob Schneider, Stewart Copeland, Rick Springfield, Retta, John Cooper Clarke, Seymour Stein, Dave Davies, Micky Dolenz, Duff McKagan, Corey Taylor, Linda Ramone, Fred Armisen, Billy Idol, Chris Jericho, Liz Carey, Carmine Appice, Gary Numan, Josh Homme, Adam Sandler, Ace Frehley, Dave Grohl, Taylor Hawkins, Jerry Cantrell, Kim Thayil, Mike McCready and Anthony Kiedis. Ian Astbury and Billy Duffy are frequent recurring guests. In late 2019, Jones planned to cut back to one show a week but suffered a heart attack shortly before the first weekly airing. Following a three-month long recovery, he returned on-air with one show a week.

In 2018 Steve Jones received a star on the Hollywood Walk of Fame due to his work as a radio disc jockey.

== Personal life ==
Around 1990 Jones was able to quit drugs and alcohol with the help of a 12-step program. Jones is a vegetarian. In 2019, Jones had surgery following a heart attack. He has never married, and resides in Southern California, where he has worked as a disc jockey on several local radio stations. Jones is a supporter of Chelsea F.C., having supported the club since his childhood.

== Bibliography ==
- Lonely Boy: Tales from a Sex Pistol (2017, Da Capo Press) with Ben Thompson

== Discography ==
Solo albums

- Mercy (1987)
- Fire and Gasoline (1989)

With Sex Pistols

- Never Mind the Bollocks, Here's the Sex Pistols (1977)
- The Great Rock 'n' Roll Swindle (1979)

With Johnny Thunders

- So Alone (1978)

With Siouxsie and the Banshees

- Kaleidoscope (1980)

With Joan Jett

- Joan Jett (1980); re-released as Bad Reputation (1981)

With The Professionals

- I Didn't See It Coming (1981)
- The Professionals (1997)

With Generation X

- Kiss Me Deadly (1981)

With Kraut

- An Adjustment to Society (1982)

With Chequered Past

- Chequered Past (1984)

With Iggy Pop

- Blah-Blah-Blah (1986)
- Instinct (1988)

With Andy Taylor

- Thunder (1987)

With Megadeth

- So Far, So Good... So What! (1988)

With Bob Dylan

- Down in the Groove (1988)

With Don Johnson

- Let It Roll (1989)

With P

- P (1995)

With Cyco Miko

- Lost My Brain! (Once Again) (1996)

With Neurotic Outsiders

- Neurotic Outsiders (1996)

With Insane Clown Posse

- The Great Milenko (1997)

With Ian Brown

- The World Is Yours (2007)

== Partial filmography ==
- The Great Rock 'n' Roll Swindle (1980)
- Punk and Its Aftershocks (1980)
- D.O.A. (1980)
- Ladies and Gentlemen, The Fabulous Stains (1981)
- Roseanne (1994) – 1 episode
- Tracey Takes On... (1999) – 1 episode
- Mascara (1999)
- Four Dogs Playing Poker (2000)
- The Filth and the Fury (2000)
- 25 Years of Punk (2001)
- Classic Albums: Sex Pistols – Never Mind the Bollocks, Here's the Sex Pistols (2002)
- Hooligans & Thugs: Soccer's Most Violent Fan Fights (2003)
- Punk: Attitude (2005)
- Played (2006)
- The Dog Problem (2006)
- Cutlass (2007)
- Amazing Journey: The Story of the Who (2007)
- Portlandia (2012)
- Californication Krull, Butler of Rock and Roll (2013)
- Saturday Night Live (2013)
- A.P. Bio (2018)

Jones was portrayed by Tony London in the 1986 Alex Cox film Sid and Nancy and by Toby Wallace in the 2022 Craig Pearce - Danny Boyle FX biographical drama miniseries Pistol.
