= Michael Holigan's Your New House =

American television show

Michael Holigan's Your New House is a syndicated home improvement television show which ran from 1994 to 2004. A sister program titled Your New House with Michael Holigan premiered on the Discovery Channel in 1998.

== Syndication ==
Through 2007 "Michael Holigan's Your New House" completed 255 episodes and 10 seasons.

== Discovery Channel ==
"Your New House with Michael Holigan" completed three seasons consisting of 60 half hour episodes and 100 one hour episodes.

== Cast ==
In addition to Michael Holigan, other talent has included:

- Al Carrell – Super Handyman
- Carmen Ciricillo – Tool Man
- Teresa Garrett - Do It Yourself
- Steve Easley - Did You Know (Factory Tours)
- Steve Greenberg - Check This Out (Gadgets)
- Sonya McKinney - Quick Tips
- Glenn Moray - Fix It Up (Remodeling)
- Joe Sherinski - Great Outdoors

== Subjects ==
The show covers home construction, improvement and finance with each episode offering a variety of topics instead of a single project. Several seasons have included a "project house" as a portion of each episode and covered these homes from ground breaking through completion.
