= Ex Pistols =

English 1979 punk rock band from london

- Origin: London, England
- Genre: Punk rock
- Years active: 1979–1992
- Labels: Virgin Records; VAP; Mandala Records
- Past members: Dave Spiers; Alan Lee; Dave Slave; Bryson Graham; Dave Goodman

The Ex Pistols were an English punk rock band from London, England formed in 1979 by former Sex Pistols producer Dave Goodman. Goodman put the group together after his services were substituted for those of other producers on the Sex Pistols album Never Mind the Bollocks, Here's the Sex Pistols.

The Ex Pistols existed as a sound-alike band meant to mislead fans due to the similar music, name, and artwork, until 1992 when the Sex Pistols successfully sued Dave Goodman and he was no longer allowed to use the name.

== Music ==
The first Ex Pistols release "Land of Hope and Glory" was a punk rock version of the old English classic "Land of Hope and Glory" by Edward Elgar. Not only did it confuse fans but it also caused legal trouble between Dave Goodman and the publisher of the original piece, Boosey & Hawkes.

The next recordings would appear on numerous Sex Pistols compilation albums including the songs "Schools Are Prisons" and "Revolution in the Classroom".

The band re-appeared in 1988 with an album released in Japan, The Swindle Continues. The album was made up of the band performing Ex and Sex Pistols tracks. It came in the form of a double picture disc collectable LP, and was also released in plain vinyl form (and later, CD).

In 1992 their tracks surfaced again on a limited promo album, Deny. The album consisted entirely of original Ex Pistols tracks, and was never merchandised but instead given to fans of the Sex Pistols or left in Virgin stores with a "Free" sticker.

A short while before he died, Dave Goodman released an album, Denial of a Good Man via his website, featuring remixed versions of some songs from the Deny LP, a video to the song "Don't Fear", and a version of "Anarchy in the UK" by the Sex Pistols with rewritten lyrics, named "Wedding Day".

== Sex Pistols lawsuit ==
While Glen Matlock played on two songs from the Deny LP and co-wrote "Happy Families", John Lydon was not so forthcoming. After winning the rights to the Sex Pistols music and documentation from Malcolm McLaren and Glitterbest, he was outraged by Dave Goodman using the band's name and image to promote what Lydon called "inferior recordings" to cash in on their name and tarnish the Sex Pistols' reputation, and for using their photographs and likenesses on the Ex Pistols' records without permission. This includes the "Land of Hope and Glory" 7" single (which has the Sex Pistols' figures on the disk, albeit with their faces crossed out), the "Revolution In The Classroom" single and The Swindle Continues. The image on the sleeve of the Deny LP is not actually Johnny, rather Ex Pistols associate Tony Barber (of the Buzzcocks), who resembles John Lydon.

After a lawsuit ensued, Dave Goodman was banned from producing any more records made to look or sound like Sex Pistols recordings. The Ex Pistols' next album, Denial Of A Good Man, was put on indefinite hold and the band changed their name to Dave Goodman & Friends. After that, they re-released one more single entitled "Justifiable Homicide" (originally released in August 1978 and made commercially available and available for download on Dave Goodman's website) and recorded and released a music video for "Don't Fear", segments of which were featured on the Chaos! The Ex Pistols' Secret History DVD. All the manufactured Denial Of A Good Man CDs were sold through Dave's website.

Dave Goodman and Kim Thraves owned a rehearsal studio with 4-track recording facilities where the Sex Pistols recorded some early demos. Goodman owned a PA system and became the Sex Pistols regular live sound engineer until 1977. Goodman produced the recordings that formed the Spunk album. Goodman's collection of very poor live sound recordings of the Sex Pistols have been released as Live Worldwide (Konexion Records, Belgium) and other titles. Some of these titles contain live Sex Pistols recordings interspersed with recordings of the Ex Pistols making it appear that these tracks were performed by the Sex Pistols.

== Band members ==
Pseudonyms used on the releases were

- Rotten Johnny (parody of Johnny Rotten)
- Pull Cock (parody of Paul Cook)
- Steal Jones (parody of Steve Jones)
- Posh Pen Bollocks (parody of Glen Matlock)

Actual musicians were

- Dave Slave - vocals
- Alan Lee - guitar, vocals
- Dave Goodman - bass guitar, vocals
- Bryson Graham - drums
- Del Bartle - guitar
- Andy Boreman - drums
- Dave MacIntosh - drums
- Kevin Murphy - drums
- Dave Rose - keyboards

== Discography ==
Year	Title	Format	Label	Country
1984	"Land of Hope and Glory"	12" Single	Virginia Records	France
1984	"Land of Hope and Glory"	7" Single	Virginia Records	UK
1988	The Swindle Continues	12" Double LP	VAP	Japan
1989	Revolution in the Classroom	7" Single	S.T.P. Records	UK
1992	Deny LP	12" Promo LP	Mandala Records	UK
2000	Denial of a Good Man	Promo CD	Vagina	UK

"Land of Hope and Glory" reached No. 2 on the UK Indie Chart.
