= Spunk =

Spunk may in colloquial English mean either courage or semen. It may otherwise refer to:

== Music ==
- Spunk (Sex Pistols bootleg album), a 1977 bootleg album by the Sex Pistols
- Spunk/This Is Crap, a 1996 re-issue of Spunk by the Sex Pistols
- Spunk!, a 1993 album by Swamp Zombies
- Spunk (play), a 1989 play by American playwright George C. Wolfe

== Internet ==
- Spunk Library, an anarchist internet archive
- Spunk.nl, a Dutch e-zine

== Other ==
- Spunk (candy), a brand of salty liquorice and wine gums from Denmark
- Spunk Creek, a stream in Minnesota
- The pseudonym of Joan Stark, an ASCII artist
- A 1927 short story by Zora Neale Hurston
