= Bottling (concert abuse) =

Action that occurs at concerts

Bottling is an action where a concert audience throws various objects at the performers onstage. This generally happens when one act in the lineup is of a completely different genre from the rest of the performing artists, especially festivals where the majority of bands are related to heavy metal and punk rock music styles, or when the performing band in question has a poor reception among dedicated fans of the genre.

While bottling generally involves empty or full bottles of water, it is also common for bottles to contain urine. Other items, such as garden furniture, mud, fireworks, broken glass, shoes, dead animals, and molotov cocktails (unlighted and lighted), have also been recorded as thrown items.

Below is a list of bottling incidents by decade and year.

== 1970s ==
- Metallic K.O. is an infamous live recording by The Stooges: during much of the performance, Iggy Pop sings while pieces of ice, eggs, beer bottles, jelly beans, and various other objects are thrown at him in response to his audience-baiting. In the essay "Iggy Pop: Blowtorch in Bondage", critic Lester Bangs calls the album a "documentation of the Iggy holocaust at its most nihilistically out of control." He describes the Stooges' concert he attended that immediately preceded the Metallic K.O. performances:

The audience, which consisted largely of bikers, was unusually hostile, and Iggy, as usual, fed on that hostility, soaked it up and gave it back and absorbed it all over again in an eerie, frightening symbiosis. "All right," he finally said, stopping a song in the middle, "you assholes wanta hear 'Louie, Louie,' we'll give you 'Louie, Louie.'" So the Stooges played a forty-five-minute version of "Louie Louie," including new lyrics improvised by the Pop on the spot consisting of "You can suck my ass / You biker faggot sissies," etc. By now the hatred in the room is one huge livid wave, and Iggy singles out one heckler who has been particularly abusive: "Listen, asshole, you heckle me one more time and I'm gonna come down there and kick your ass." "Fuck you, you little punk," responds the biker. So Iggy jumps off the stage, runs through the middle of the crowd, and the guy beats the shit out of him, ending the evening's musical festivities by sending the lead singer back to his motel room and a doctor. I walk into the dressing room, where I encounter the manager of the club offering to punch out anybody in the band who will take him on. The next day the bike gang, who call themselves the Scorpions, will phone WABX-FM and promise to kill Iggy and the Stooges if they play the Michigan Palace on Thursday night. They do (play, that is), and nobody gets killed, but Metallic K.O. is the only rock album I know where you can actually hear hurled beer bottles breaking against guitar strings.

- On 27 January 1973 while performing at the Grand Hall in Kilmarnock, Scotland, The Sweet were driven offstage by bottling, inspiring the band to write The Ballroom Blitz.
- Ten-Cent Beer Night—On June 4, 1974, during a game between the Texas Rangers and the Cleveland Indians at Cleveland Stadium, unruly and drunken fans repeatedly disrupted the game and, after the Indians tied the game, invaded the field and threw bottles and other objects, including hot dogs, lit firecrackers, radio batteries and folding chairs. Both the Rangers and the Indians sought refuge in their clubhouses. The Indians forfeited the game to the Rangers.
- On June 3, 1977, restless fans threw rocks and beer bottles at Led Zeppelin when a concert in Tampa, Florida, was ended early due to a severe thunderstorm—even though the tickets said "rain or shine"—resulting in a small riot that left over 100 injured due to crowd crushing.
- In 1978, AC/DC were bottled on stage at the Seattle Center Coliseum after Angus Young got onto Bon Scott's shoulders and walked into the audience, but the band continued playing after this incident.
- The Ramones were booed and pelted with various objects, including sandwiches and bottles, at the Canadian World Music Festival in Toronto in July 1979, with the abuse only ending after Johnny Ramone flipped off the crowd six songs into the set.
- Disco Demolition Night—On July 12, 1979, at Comiskey Park in Chicago, fans during an anti-disco rally before the second game of a Detroit Tigers–Chicago White Sox doubleheader raided the field and threw bottles, firecrackers and lighters. The White Sox forfeited the game to the Tigers. (The Tigers won the first game, 4–1.)
- At a Jethro Tull concert in Madison Square Garden on October 12, 1979, a fan threw a rose onstage which hit Ian Anderson, wounding his eye with a thorn. The band was forced to cancel the next two shows while Anderson recovered. He appeared at subsequent concert dates wearing protective goggles.

== 1980s ==
- Peter and the Test Tube Babies were repeatedly spat on during the recording of Pissed and Proud. On the album, the lead singer can be heard asking the audience to "Leave out the gob, we had a shower this morning, you cunts."
- In October 1982, Talk Talk were relentlessly bottled at the Genesis reunion concert at Milton Keynes Bowl on 2nd October 1982
- In 1982, The Who played a show at the Tangerine Bowl in Orlando, Florida. The two support acts were Joan Jett and The B-52's, who were both pelted with food and bottles by a section of the audience who were only there for The Who. The B-52's ended their set 20 minutes in due to Cindy Wilson being hit in the stomach with an apple.
- As documented on "Geneva Farewell" from You Can't Do That on Stage Anymore, Vol. 5, a July 1982 Frank Zappa concert in Geneva ended early due to audience members throwing cigarettes on stage.
- Steel Pulse were heavily bottled by fans waiting for punk rock group The Stranglers' act at the Reading Festival in 1983, starting the festival's trend.
- On April 6, 1985, Deep Purple performed at the Pacific Coliseum in Vancouver, British Columbia, Canada. Partway through the show, Ritchie Blackmore was hit by a wineskin thrown by an audience member. He stormed offstage, ending the show.
- Dutch Claw Boys Claw were pelted at Pinkpop 1986 with everything from mud to food to bottles after singer Peter te Bos started throwing objects into the audience, ranging from his half-eaten apple to test pressings of their new album to his own shoe.
- The spoof heavy metal band Bad News were bottled extensively in 1986 at Monsters of Rock, prior to the band's musical performance beginning, with Rik Mayall trying to bat some missiles back at the audience with his guitar.
- The Communards were bottled at Pinkpop in 1987. Jimmy Somerville briefly left the stage but returned to finish the set.
- Meat Loaf and Bonnie Tyler were bottled at the 1988 Reading Festival.
- In 1989 a very young Texas were opening for Simple Minds in Cardiff Arms Park. The band temporarily halted the show due to being continually pelted by a sea of plastic bottles. Lead singer Sharleen Spiteri angrily chastised the crowd who stopped throwing in response: "Do you think it is alright to throw bottles at a wee lassie up here on stage?" at which point a lone bottle was thrown, it arched through the air towards the band and as was clearly seen on the large stage monitors hit Spiteri directly on the head. A huge cheer went up and a deluge of bottles followed, not letting up until Spiteri and Texas had stormed off stage.

== 1990s ==
- On October 30, 1992, at José Amalfitani Stadium in Buenos Aires, Argentina, the opening act for Nirvana, the all-girl band Calamity Jane, were pelted with mud, rocks, and trash, and booed off the stage. In response, Nirvana intentionally sabotaged their own performance.
- Pavement were bottled during a Lollapalooza event in West Virginia in 1995 with mud. A rock hit Stephen Malkmus in the chest, causing Malkmus to storm off stage, abruptly ending their set. The incident is featured in the documentary Slow Century.
- Everclear front man Art Alexakis was pegged in the mouth with a full water bottle at some point during the So Much for the Afterglow tour. The bottle knocked loose one of his front teeth.
- At a November 5, 1993 concert at Empire Polo Club, Pearl Jam were pelted by hundreds of shoes thrown by the audience and were forced to play behind their amplifiers. Eddie Vedder addressed the crowd, joking that he and Jeff Ament were going to be at the gate after the show and beat up every barefoot person they see. He then stated that instead, the band were going to donate the shoes to charity. A recording of the incident was included on Pearl Jam's 1993 Fan Club Holiday Single, and the recording of the song "Blood" was included as a b-side on the Daughter single.
- On August 10, 1995, at Dodger Stadium in Los Angeles, California, Dodger fans threw souvenir baseballs onto the field during the seventh and ninth innings of the Dodgers' game against the St. Louis Cardinals. The latter disruption came after umpire Jim Quick ejected the Dodgers' manager, Tommy Lasorda, following a questionable strikeout call. The Dodgers forfeited the game to the Cardinals.
- On September 17, 1995, Silverchair's Daniel Johns had a bottle thrown at him during a performance of the song "Israel's Son" at Santa Monica Pier when he was 16 years old. He received multiple stitches to his eyebrow, which he later turned into an eyebrow piercing.
- On December 23, 1995, at Giants Stadium in East Rutherford, New Jersey, during a game between the San Diego Chargers and the New York Giants, Giants fans threw snowballs in the stands and onto the field, primarily aimed at the Chargers. One snowball hit a member of the Chargers' coaching staff, knocking him to the turf. Referee Ron Blum threatened to forfeit the game to the Chargers if the snowballing did not cease. The Chargers eventually overcame the snowballs and the Giants, defeating them 27–17.
- The Sex Pistols were bottled off stage at Denmark's Roskilde Festival in 1996. The band left the stage briefly after only two songs but returned to play another three. Johnny Rotten asked the crowd to stop; however, bottling continued and the band ended their set with Rotten criticising the crowd for failing to "police themselves".
- On June 17, 1997, at an Ozzfest event, concert goers began throwing bottles at the bands on stage, smashed box office windows, started fires, and overturned cars after the announcement that Ozzy Osbourne would not perform.
- A full bottle of Sprite was thrown at James as they performed at V Festival in the mid-1990s. It struck lead guitarist Adrian Oxaal on the head and temporarily dazed him; after a few moments, he continued to play and the set finished without further incident.
- During her performance at Pinkpop 1998, some people in the audience threw a couple of eggs at Dutch singer Anouk. In response, she took off her shirt and finished her performance in a red bra, as was shown on Dutch television.
- The Manic Street Preachers were heavily bottled at the Swansea Heineken Festival in 1993. After a bottle hit Nicky Wire in the head, James Dean Bradfield led the band off stage. The band eventually came back onstage and finished their set.
- In 1999, Kevin Rowland was bottled at Reading Festival, after appearing wearing a dress and stockings and being accompanied by two female dancers in stockings.
- During the Woodstock '99 festival, Canadian folk rock band The Tragically Hip were pelted with rocks and bottles by audience members who were there to see harder metal acts on the bill like Kid Rock and Rage Against the Machine. Some American concertgoers reportedly taunted the band and their fans by singing "The Star-Spangled Banner" while the group performed a brief rendition of "O Canada".

== 2000s ==
=== 2000 ===
- Daphne and Celeste were heavily bottled at the Reading Festival, and left the stage at the start of their last song. Pop punk favorites Blink-182 were scheduled to follow them later that day. The duo accused the crowd of "wasting so much food", which was one of the items thrown at them. The duo themselves have differing opinions if this incident was the beginning of the end of their time together.

=== 2001 ===
- Marilyn Manson was bottled during OzzFest at The Docks in Toronto. A fan threw a water bottle at the stage during the song "The Nobodies" just before the end. Immediately bassist Twiggy Ramirez pointed it out to Manson, who demanded that the fan who threw the bottle approach the stage for a duel. After the fan did so, Manson returned the bottle to him, allowed him to climb onto the stage and goaded him into throwing the bottle again after a countdown. Manson responded by throwing a bottle of his own, which hit the fan in the face, and he was also pelted by many more water bottles coming from the crowd. Following losing the duel, Marilyn taunted the fan, saying "Who's got the good aim now? You fucking bitch. Get the fuck off my stage, you pussy." He then proceeded to play the song "Rock Is Dead".
- Bottlegate—On December 16, 2001, at Cleveland Browns Stadium, during week 14 of the 2001 NFL season, the Cleveland Browns were sitting at 6–6, desperate for a win to keep their playoff hopes alive. Down 15–10 with 1:08 remaining, the Browns were forced to try to convert on 4th and 2 at the Jacksonville Jaguars’ 12-yard line. Quarterback Tim Couch took the snap and passed short to wide receiver Quincy Morgan, who appeared to bobble the ball after a 3-yard gain, but the officials called it a completed pass. Couch hurried the offense to the line and spiked the ball with 0:48 remaining. The officials announced that they would review the 4th down conversion, but overturned it, giving the ball to the Jaguars. Enraged, the fans began throwing objects onto the field, including beer bottles. After a few minutes, the officials ended the game 48 seconds early and everyone exited the field. However, Paul Tagliabue, the league commissioner, called, telling them that they must finish the game. The teams and officials came back onto the field with 13 random players selected and, after two kneels by Jaguars quarterback Mark Brunell, the game was over, and the Jaguars won 15–10.

=== 2002 ===
- Lostprophets were bottled at the London leg of the Deconstruction Tour in 2002. Their addition to the bill of a predominantly punk rock lineup had been controversial, and the band were pelted with projectiles throughout their set, one striking singer Ian Watkins. The band subsequently cut their set twenty minutes short.

=== 2003 ===
- Good Charlotte were bottled at the Reading Festival. They encouraged the crowd to "Boo, hiss and throw some more" on a count of three only to storm off the stage afterwards.
- Justin Timberlake was bottled at the Toronto Rocks concert while playing on the same bill as AC/DC and The Rolling Stones.
- Kelly Osbourne was bottled at the Game On festival. She left the stage 10 minutes into her half-hour set.
- Limp Bizkit were bottled while opening for Metallica before 40,000 spectators at Hawthorne Race Course in Chicago.

=== 2004 ===
- At the Reading Festival, rapper 50 Cent was pelted with bottles, many of which were filled with urine. One audience member threw a deckchair onto the stage. 50 Cent lasted nearly 20 minutes before finally throwing his microphone into the crowd in anger. The Rasmus were also bottled off following one song.
- At the Sydney Big Day Out in 2004, restless Metallica fans waiting for the band to play threw bottles at The Strokes during their set on the adjacent stage. One bottle struck lead singer Julian Casablancas in the face, which prompted him to taunt the Metallica fans. After more bottles were thrown, Casablancas jumped down from his stage and confronted the angry crowd face to face.
- On January 5, 2004, at Dunkin' Donuts Center in Providence, Rhode Island, Providence College fans threw bottles onto the court after the Texas Longhorns defeated the Providence Friars, 79–77, when a controversial buzzer beater by forward P. J. Tucker was upheld by the officials following video review.
- On June 19, 2004, a member of the audience at the Norwegian Wood Festival threw a lollipop at performer David Bowie. The lollipop stem lodged itself under Bowie's eyelid. The concert was stopped briefly while support personnel dealt with the errant lollipop. After expressing his frustrations to the crowd, Bowie resumed his performance.

=== 2005 ===
- Iron Maiden were egged at their final performance at Ozzfest in 2005. Frontman Bruce Dickinson reportedly urged audience members to "break the arms" of members who were throwing objects on the stage. Other objects such as bottle caps and pieces of ice were thrown on stage as well.
- Simple Plan were bottled at the Ovation Music Festival. Lead singer Pierre Bouvier was rushed to a hospital shortly after.
- British-Italian guitarist Richard Benson was repeatedly targeted by the audience during Natale del Male in Rome, his first live performance in two years. Items thrown by the crowd included beer, toilet paper, lettuce, yogurt, a pizza, a toilet brush, and at least one whole raw chicken. The set was cut short due to extensive damage to his sound equipment. The pelting of objects, particularly food, would become a regular occurrence at his concerts, and for the remainder of his career he would perform behind protective netting.

=== 2006 ===
- My Chemical Romance and Panic! at the Disco were both bottled at the Reading Festival. Both bands finished their set and the former claimed it as a 'victory.' The incident with Panic! at the Disco was heavily reported by many websites, as singer Brendon Urie was knocked unconscious.
- The Mars Volta had bottles full of urine thrown at them at Endfest. This combined with various sound problems resulted in the band walking off the stage.
- Intricate Unit was bottled by thousands at the Gathering of the Juggalos in Ohio while opening for Dark Lotus and Insane Clown Posse.
- The Veronicas were bottled at the Coke Live 'n' Local in Adelaide. Lisa was hit in the face, and the band threatened to end their set early, screaming abuse.
- Lee Harding was bottled off during a performance at the 2006 Bassinthegrass in Darwin. During the performance, then-Chief Minister Clare Martin tried to convince Harding to continue playing, but after only one more song he received a bottle to the face, yelled to the crowd "you guys are shit" and stormed off stage.

=== 2007 ===
- My Chemical Romance were heavily bottled again, this time during their headline spot at Download 2007.
- Comedian Lewis Black was bottled at the Bonnaroo Music Festival while sitting in on a performance by the band Gov't Mule.
- On June 24, 2007, Jeffree Star was banned from Toronto's Gay Pride Parade for punching a female fan in the face after spectators standing near her threw bottles onstage.

=== 2008 ===
- As I Lay Dying was bottled at the Soundwave festival in Sydney in February. The set was cut short as guitarist Nick Hipa was injured.
- Josh Homme of Queens of the Stone Age was bottled at the Norwegian Wood concert on June 13. This prompted Homme to call him out and say: "You miserable fucking cunt, go back to your mom's house, you 12-year-old dickless fucking turd. And his friends, you wanna throw something too? Or all you cool, are you all good?"
- Relatively unknown band The FF'ers were bottled heavily at the Reading Festival after rumours circulated that their set was in fact a Foo Fighters secret show. According to their bassist, items thrown included "not just bottles but shoes, clumps of earth, phones, a full packet of cigarettes".
- Bring Me the Horizon were bottled at the 2008 Reading Festival when appearing as a last-minute replacement for Slipknot, after drummer Joey Jordison broke his ankle. The band were heavily bottled which caused singer Oliver Sykes to respond to the abuse by saying: "It looks a right mess up here on this stage, you obviously don't like our band but that's okay." Other items thrown were crisps and woodchips from the floor. A year later the band appeared at the festival again, but as an official act rather than a replacement albeit three stages down to the Festival Republic Stage. They would later return to the main stage, but with a positive reception.
- Later on in the day, American alternative rock band The Plain White T's were bottled during the early stages of their set. The abuse was put down to the demographic their music was aimed at, as Metallica were that day's headliners.
- Lethal Bizzle was heavily bottled during his set at the 2008 Download Festival as he was the only act on the bill not associated with rock or heavy metal. Other items thrown included hundreds of pots of Müller Rice which were being given free by a vendor on site. Despite this Bizzle completed his set and even came back on stage for an encore.
- Rapper Lil' Wayne was bottled in Stratford, London, due to his inactivity on stage, where he reacted by telling the audience the show was over. As a response, he received more bottling.
- Andrew W.K. was bottled at the Gathering of the Juggalos. In spite of this, he continued performing, shouting: "To anybody, you can do whatever you want to do! I love you, no matter what you think of me!"

=== 2009 ===
- Metal band Cradle of Filth were bottled during a headline slot at Bloodstock Open Air. Guitarist Paul Allender collapsed and was hospitalised after being hit by a large piece of candy thrown by the audience. The band cut the set short and made an overhead announcement.
- Morrissey was bottled at Liverpool Echo Arena in November 2009. He said "goodbye" and left the stage in the middle of his second song.
- Justin Bieber was bottled at the Jingle Ball concert in Sacramento, California, in December 2009. After being struck in the head, Bieber said "Ow! That didn't feel good! I don't know why she just threw that at me." He finished the show.

== 2010s ==
=== 2010 ===
- On September 1, 2010, Guns N' Roses were bottled after appearing on stage an hour late at The O_{2} (now 3Arena) in Dublin.
- In August 2010, Tila Tequila was bottled off stage at the Gathering of the Juggalos. She vowed to take legal action against the organizers and promoters for the event.

=== 2011 ===
- Scottish rock band Glasvegas was bottled at the V Festival in August 2011. They ended their set after four songs, then attempted to restart, but left again after the audience continued to throw objects at them.
- On November 15, 2011, during the opening number at a Motörhead show, Lemmy stopped the song after several bottles were thrown, and told the audience, "All right, listen, we are a rock and roll band, we are not a fuckin' target for some cunt with a fuckin' beer bottle! Anyone else wants to throw something at me, come up here and throw a fucking punch and I'll kick your fuckin' teeth in!" before restarting the song.

=== 2012 ===
- Several bottles of urine were thrown at Cher Lloyd at the V Festival in August 2012. During her second song she fled the stage to compose herself. Although Cher's management advised her to halt the gig for her safety she decided to return and resume her performance. When she returned she told the crowd "It's hard enough being up here, but it's not nice having bottles of piss chucked at you." She ultimately had to end her set early after more bottles were thrown.
- Black Veil Brides suffered bottling abuse from metal fans at June 2012's Download Festival. The lead singer, Andy Biersack, responded to this by "mooning" the crowd. On the Download 2012 Sky Arts highlights, Biersack can clearly be seen in the Black Veil Brides video narrowly avoiding a launched bottle during "Fallen Angels". The band also endured bottling incidents throughout other songs as well as numerous offensive gestures from members of the crowd and verbal satisfaction from the crowd upon leaving the stage at the end of their set.

=== 2013 ===
- A bottle was thrown at and hit Jeff Mills on the head during a live set at Atlantico, Rome on April 24, 2013.
- A vodka bottle was thrown at Toots Hibbert during a performance at the River Rock Festival in Richmond, Virginia, on May 18, 2013. The 71-year-old musician suffered a concussion, and the wound required six staples. All planned shows were immediately cancelled. The official website of the band, Toots and the Maytals, states that "all future performances of Toots & the Maytals have regrettably been cancelled". In a letter to the judge, Toots Hibbert wrote "I continue to suffer from extreme anxiety, memory loss, headaches, dizziness and most sadly of all, a fear of crowds and performing. I am not able to write songs as I did before or remember the lyrics of songs that I wrote and have performed for decades."
- Leigh-Anne Pinnock of Little Mix was struck with a bottle during a show with the group at the Access All Eirias festival in Wales.

=== 2015 ===
- A fan threw bottles of beer during a Van Halen concert in August 2015 after finishing "In A Simple Rhyme". David Lee Roth then signaled the fans to start their next song, while adding: "Next time, you save the beer for me, you slime." Roth also gave the finger afterwards.
- A bottle was thrown at Harry Styles during a concert with One Direction in September 2015, hitting him in the groin.

=== 2017 ===
- Bottles were thrown at Kerry Katona and Natasha Hamilton of Atomic Kitten at Quack, the University of Lincoln's student union event. They left the stage after 15 minutes for their safety.

== 2020s ==
=== 2021 ===
On October 16, 2021, University of Tennessee fans threw bottles and other objects, including a golf ball which hit Ole Miss head coach Lane Kiffin, onto the Neyland Stadium field after the Tennessee Volunteers were ruled to have been stopped short on fourth down with 54 seconds remaining. The game was delayed some 20 minutes. The Rebels defeated the Vols, 31–26. The commissioner of the Southeastern Conference, Greg Sankey, announced the following Monday that the University of Tennessee would be fined $250,000 for its fans' bottling.

=== 2022 ===
- In July 2022, Lady Gaga had something thrown at her from the audience during a concert on her Chromatica Ball tour.
- On December 17, 2022, during the second quarter of the Buffalo Bills' game against the Miami Dolphins at Highmark Stadium, fans threw snowballs onto the field, briefly delaying the game. Referee Bill Vinovich threatened the fans with a 15-yard penalty against the Bills if a snowball hit anyone on the field. The snowballing eventually ceased and the Bills would defeat the Dolphins 32–29.

=== 2023 ===
- On June 18, 2023, Bebe Rexha required stitches after she was hit by a fan's cellular phone during one of her concerts. The suspect was caught and arrested.
- On June 28, 2023, Kelsea Ballerini was hit in the face with a bracelet. After a break to check for injuries, she came back to the stage to resume her performance.
- On July 5, 2023, at a Chicago stop on his "It's All a Blur" concert tour, a fan threw a cellphone at Drake from the crowd, seemingly hitting him in the arm.

== In fiction ==
The title characters were bottled in a pivotal scene in The Blues Brothers, famously only protected by a mesh of chicken wire.
