= Sex Pistols (box set) =

Box set by Sex Pistols
- Released: 3 June 2002
- Recorded: 1976–1978
- Genre: Punk rock
- Length: 220:10
- Label: Virgin Records
- Producer: Various

Professional ratings
Review scores
Source	Rating
AllMusic	3/5 stars

Sex Pistols is a box set anthology of the career of the punk band The Sex Pistols with singer Johnny Rotten. It was released on 3 June 2002. The set comprises three themed CDs and an 80-page booklet.

The first disc features Never Mind the Bollocks, the band's only studio album, in its entirety, as well as four B-sides and the band's first demo session.

The second disc has demos and studio outtakes, from July 1976 to January 1977 and from the Never Mind the Bollocks sessions. This, together with the first disc, includes most of the material recorded by the band while Johnny Rotten was the singer.

The third disc, composed of previously unreleased live tracks, is almost completely taken from a 31 August 1976 gig at Islington Screen on the Green Cinema. Live bonus tracks include songs never recorded in the studio, "Understanding", "Flowers of Romance" and the live performance of "Belsen Was a Gas".

== Completeness ==
The box set includes almost the entire known recorded output of the band while Johnny Rotten was in the band.

A few demos are not included, but they can be found on the bootleg album Spunk and the 1996 extended release of Never Mind the Bollocks, Here's the Sex Pistols which comes with Spunk/This Is Crap. The missing "Submission (Version 2)" is included on the widespread bootleg "Party Till You Puke" and on disc 2 of the 1992 "Pretty Vacant" double maxi CD. A few additional demos were released on the Alternative Takes 7" single box set in 2014.

This box set, the 2006 15-song-remaster of "Spunk", disc 2 of the "Pretty Vacant" 1992 CD single, and the Alternative Takes 7" single box set, comprises the entire studio output of the Rotten-era band.

To note is that the "Pretty Vacant" version from July 1976, included on the box set as the first track on disc 2 is in fact the same recording as on the "Spunk" album, only with a slightly different mix and added studio chatter from the intro of the January 1977 session.

The full list of all missing tracks from the Johnny Rotten era not included on the box set is:

- "Pretty Vacant", "Lazy Sod", "Satellite", and "Anarchy in the UK" from the first Dave Goodman sessions at Denmark Studio and Riverside Studio in 1976
- "Problems", "Pretty Vacant", "Liar", and "EMI" from the third Dave Goodman sessions at Gooseberry Studios and Eden Studios, January in 1977
- "Body" (Bodies) demo and "Submission" demo #2 from Bill Price's album sessions at Wessex Studios in June 1977
- "Belsen Was a Gas" demos #1 and #2, recorded by John Tiberi at Denmark Street Rehearsal Room in London, 20 September 1977

None of the post-Johnny Rotten material is included on the box, most of which can be found on The Great Rock 'n' Roll Swindle soundtrack. It might be worth noting Sid Vicious, while commonly referred to as the bass player for the Sex Pistols, only plays on one track out of sixty-four on this box set.

== Track listing ==
=== Disc 1: Studio Tracks & Early Demos ===
All tracks are written by Paul Cook, Steve Jones, Glen Matlock and Johnny Rotten except where noted

No.	Title	Writer(s)	Length
1.	"Holidays in the Sun"	Paul Cook, Steve Jones, Sid Vicious, Johnny Rotten	3:22
2.	"Bodies"	Paul Cook, Steve Jones, Sid Vicious, Johnny Rotten	3:02
3.	"No Feelings"		2:51
4.	"Liar"		2:41
5.	"God Save the Queen"		3:20
6.	"Problems"		4:11
7.	"Seventeen"		2:02
8.	"Anarchy in the U.K."		3:31
9.	"Submission"		4:12
10.	"Pretty Vacant"		3:18
11.	"New York"		3:06
12.	"EMI (Unlimited Edition)"		3:13
13.	"I Wanna Be Me"		3:06
14.	"No Feeling (bonus b-side)"		2:47
15.	"Did You No Wrong"	Paul Cook, Steve Jones, Glen Matlock, Johnny Rotten, Wally Nightingale	3:09
16.	"No Fun (unedited)"	The Stooges	6:56
17.	"Satellite"		4:01
18.	"Problems"		3:41
19.	"Pretty Vacant"		2:44
20.	"No Feelings *"		6:53

Note: * includes the hidden track "Anarchy in the UK" (instrumental) 3:42

- Tracks 1–12 are comprised by Never Mind the Bollocks Here's the Sex Pistols
- Tracks 13–17 are B-Sides
- Tracks 18–20 are demos recorded at the Majestic Studios demo session in May 1976
- Hidden track is a TV backing track recorded at the Wessex Studio in December 1976

=== Disc 2: Demos & Rarities ===
All tracks are written by Paul Cook, Steve Jones, Glen Matlock and Johnny Rotten except where noted

No.	Title	Writer(s)	Length
1.	"Pretty Vacant"		3:54
2.	"Submission"		4:09
3.	"Anarchy in the U.K."		4:05
4.	"Substitute"	Pete Townshend	3:11
5.	"(Don't Give Me) No Lip"	Barry Richards, Don Thomas, Jean Thomas	3:15
6.	"(I'm Not Your) Stepping Stone"	Tommy Boyce, Bobby Hart	3:00
7.	"Johnny B. Goode"	Chuck Berry	1:44
8.	"Road Runner"	Jonathan Richman	4:10
9.	"Watcha Gonna Do About It?"	Brian Potter, Ian Samwell	1:57
10.	"Through My Eyes"	The Creation	1:43
11.	"Anarchy in the U.K."		3:32
12.	"No Feelings (instrumental)"		3:03
13.	"No Future"		5:00
14.	"Liar"		3:33
15.	"Problems"		4:23
16.	"New York"		3:08
17.	"God Save the Queen"		3:39
18.	"Satellite"		4:00
19.	"EMI"		3:14
20.	"Seventeen"		2:05
21.	"No Feelings"		2:49
22.	"Submission (Version #1)"		4:18

Note: * Includes the hidden track "God Save the Queen" (instrumental) 3:21

- Tracks 1–2 are demos from the Denmark Street session in July 1976
- Track 3 is the Wessex Studio session recording from October 1976
- Tracks 4–10 are taken from rehearsal sessions in Wessex Studio, in October 1976
- Track 11 is the rejected version of the Anarchy in The UK 7" single
- Tracks 12–15 are demo sessions from the Manchester Square session in December 1976
- Tracks 16–17 are recordings from Gooseberry Studios from January 1977
- Tracks 18–22 are outtakes from Never Mind the Bollocks Here's the Sex Pistols
- Hidden track is a TV backing track recorded as the Wessex Studio in December 1976

=== Disc 3: Live at Screen on the Green '76, plus live rarities ===
All tracks are written by Paul Cook, Steve Jones, Glen Matlock and Johnny Rotten except where noted

No.	Title	Writer(s)	Length
1.	"Anarchy in the U.K."		4:55
2.	"I Wanna Be Me"		3:11
3.	"Seventeen"		2:19
4.	"New York"		3:07
5.	"(Don't Give Me) No Lip"	Barry Richards, Don Thomas, Jean Thomas	3:45
6.	"(I'm Not Your) Stepping Stone"	Tommy Boyce, Bobby Hart	5:49
7.	"Satellite"		2:14
8.	"Submission"		3:51
9.	"Liar"		3:30
10.	"No Feelings"		3:05
11.	"Substitute"	Pete Townshend	3:07
12.	"Pretty Vacant"		3:09
13.	"Problems"		5:05
14.	"Did You No Wrong"	Paul Cook, Steve Jones, Glen Matlock, John Lydon, Wally Nightingale	3:49
15.	"No Fun"	The Stooges	4:56
16.	"Understanding (live bonus track)"	Small Faces	4:13
17.	"Flowers of Romance #1" (live bonus track)"		2:32
18.	"Flowers of Romance #2" (live bonus track)"		1:47
19.	"Belsen Was a Gas" (live bonus track)*"	Paul Cook, Steve Jones, Sid Vicious, John Lydon	2:30

Note: Includes the hidden track "Pretty Vacant" (instrumental) 3:08

- Tracks 1–15: 29 August 1976 – Screen on the Green Cinema, Islington, UK
- Track 16: 3 April 1976 – Nashville Rooms, London, UK
- Track 17: 29 June 1976 – 100 Club, London, UK
- Track 18: 14 August 1976 – Barbarellas, Birmingham, UK
- Track 19: 10 January 1978 – Longhorn Ballroom, Dallas, United States
- Hidden track is a TV backing track recorded at the Wessex Studio in December 1976

== Personnel ==
- Johnny Rotten – vocals
- Steve Jones – electric guitars, bass
- Paul Cook – drums
- Glen Matlock – bass disc one, tracks 8, 13, 18–20; disc two, tracks 1–17; disc three, tracks 1–18
- Sid Vicious – bass live "Belsen Was a Gas" only
