= Musick to Insult Your Intelligence By =

2009 studio album by Green Jellÿ

Studio album by Green Jellÿ
- Released: October 13, 2009
- Recorded: 1995
- Length: 41:12
- Label: Rotten Records
- Producer: Green Jellÿ

Green Jellÿ chronology
333 (1994)	Musick to Insult Your Intelligence By (2009)	Garbage Band Kids (2021)

Professional ratings
Review scores
Source	Rating
AllMusic	2.5/5 stars

Musick to Insult Your Intelligence By is the third studio album by American comedy rock band Green Jellÿ. It was released on October 13, 2009, through Rotten Records. The album was originally recorded in 1995, though ultimately would not be released until after Green Jellÿ reunited in 2008. It was initially scheduled to be released on September 29, 2009, though was pushed back to October 13. It is the band's first LP in 15 years following 333 (1994), and was released on Rotten as Green Jellÿ's original distributor, Zoo Entertainment, folded in 1997. Green Jellÿ founder Bill Manspeaker and most of the original lineup from Cereal Killer and 333 perform on this album.

== Track listing ==
No.	Title	Length
1.	"Sugar & Spice"	3:55
2.	"Gefilte Fish"	3:33
3.	"Rooster Jowls"	2:28
4.	"Albert Fish Liverwurst"	5:35
5.	"Stabby the Clown"	5:31
6.	"Geek Girl"	2:34
7.	"I Will Not"	3:08
8.	"You're Gone"	1:44
9.	"Nothing to Say"	4:29
10.	"Magic Ed"	2:21
11.	"Trick or Treat"	2:32
12.	"The Ballad of Swing Low Scroty"	3:22
Total length:		41:12
