= I'm the Leader of the Gang (I Am) =

1973 single by Gary Glitter

Single by Gary Glitter
- B-side: "Just Fancy That"
- Released: July 1973
- Genre: Glam rock
- Length: 3:25
- Label: Bell
- Songwriters: Gary Glitter; Mike Leander
- Producer: Mike Leander

Gary Glitter singles chronology
"Hello, Hello, I'm Back Again" (1973)	"I'm the Leader of the Gang (I Am)" (1973)	"I Love You Love Me Love" (1973)

Official audio
- "I'm the Leader of the Gang (I Am)" on YouTube

"I'm the Leader of the Gang (I Am)" is a song by the English glam rock singer Gary Glitter, written by Glitter with Mike Leander and produced by Mike Leander. It was Glitter's first number-one single on the UK singles chart, spending four weeks at the top of the chart in July 1973.

== Description ==
The song "I'm the Leader of the Gang (I Am)" was a top hit for Gary Glitter; it reached number-one in the UK singles chart in July and August 1973. It was written by Gary Glitter and Mike Leander and produced by Mike Leander. As a result of its popularity, Glitter's nickname became "The Leader", and his 1991 autobiography was titled Leader.

A glam rock anthem typical of Glitter's early 1970s output, the melody is based on a simple mid-tempo rhythm (the so-called "Glitter Stomp") and loud chanted backing vocals such as "Hey!" and "Come on, come on!". Glitter had a backing band, The Glitter Band; however, with the exception of saxophonists Harvey Ellison and John Rossall, they did not participate in his recording sessions, and precisely who else, if anyone, helped Glitter and producer/co-writer Mike Leander in the studio remains unknown. Glitter said in interviews that he and Leander preferred to play everything themselves, since it allowed them to record the songs as they were being written.

The song became a concert favourite with the crowd chanting the "Come on, come on!" refrain before Glitter took to the stage. Although Glitter's version failed to chart in the U.S., the following year a version by Brownsville Station made the Top 30 on the Cashbox Top 100, No. 48 on the Billboard Hot 100, and No. 38 in Canada.

In 1986, still a popular live act, Glitter re-recorded the song with heavy metal band Girlschool.

In 1997, girl group Spice Girls covered the song for their musical comedy film Spice World. Glitter originally made a cameo appearance, but his scene was deleted after his child pornography possession arrest. A bootleg of the scene surfaced some time later. The Full Monty, another 1997 British comedy, used the song as well.

== Track listing ==
1. "I'm the Leader of the Gang (I Am)" – 3:25
2. "Just Fancy That" – 2:36

== Peter and the Test Tube Babies cover ==
In 1982, the Peacehaven's punk band Peter and the Test Tube Babies covered the song on their album Pissed and Proud.

== Green Jellÿ cover ==
"I'm the Leader of the Gang (I Am)"

Single by Hulk Hogan with Green Jellÿ
- B-side: "Thing-a-Ma-Bob"; "Hulkamaniac"
- Released: 1993
- Genre: Comedy rock; heavy metal
- Length: 4:04
- Label: Arista
- Songwriters: Gary Glitter; Mike Leander
- Producer: C. J. Buscaglia

Green Jellÿ singles chronology
"Electric Harley House (of Love)" (1993)	"I'm the Leader of the Gang (I Am)" (1993)	"House Me Teenage Rave" (1993)

In 1993, the American comedy rock band Green Jellÿ released "I'm the Leader of the Gang (I Am)", with professional wrestler Hulk Hogan singing lead vocals. The release scored the band a third top 40 hit in the United Kingdom, reaching no. 25 on the UK Singles Chart.

=== Track listing ===
No.	Title	Length
1.	"I'm the Leader of the Gang"	4:04
2.	"I'm the Leader of the Gang" (12" Remix)	3:40
3.	"Thing-a-Ma-Bob"	3:10
4.	"Hulkamaniac"	4:40
