= Green Jellÿ =

American comedy rock band

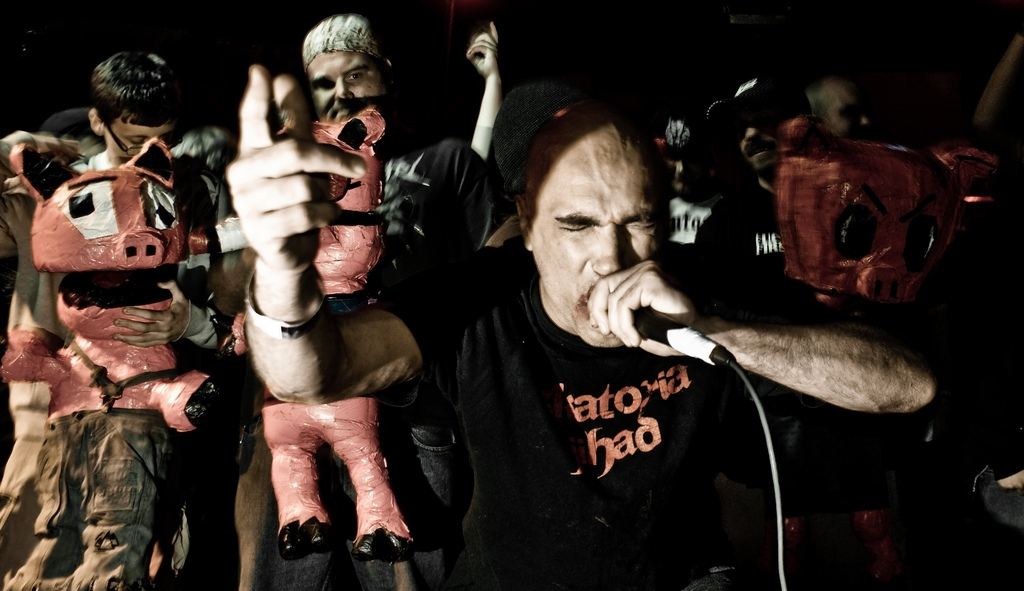
- Green Jellÿ performing in 2010

Background information
- Origin: Buffalo, New York; Hollywood, California, U.S.
- Genres: Comedy rock; heavy metal; punk rock; alternative metal
- Years active: 1981–1995; 2008–present
- Labels: Zoo Entertainment; Volcano; Originology; Rotten Records
- Members: Bill Manspeaker; Lazy D; Jella Lugosi; Tekatesha; Hammy Hagar
- Past members: Maynard James Keenan; Danny Carey
- Website: greenjellÿ.com

Green Jellÿ (/ɡriːn ˈdʒɛloʊ/, green Jell-O) is an American comedy rock band formed in 1981. Originally named Green Jellö, the band changed its name due to legal pressure from Kraft Foods Inc., the owners of the Jell-O brand, who claimed that it was an infringement of their trademark.

Known for sophomoric humor, theatrical performances, and intentionally crude musicianship, Green Jellÿ has had hundreds of members during its existence. A core group of musicians makes up the main cast of characters, with vocalist Bill Manspeaker being the only consistent member throughout. Notable past members include Danny Carey and Maynard James Keenan, who were both in Green Jellÿ during the early 1990s and went on to form Tool.

To date, the band has released five studio albums: Triple Live Möther Gööse at Budokan (1989), Cereal Killer Soundtrack (1993), 333 (1994), Musick to Insult Your Intelligence By (2009), and Garbage Band Kids (2021). They are best known for their 1992 hit "Three Little Pigs", which was adapted from the fairy tale.

== History ==
=== Early years (1981–1990) ===
Bill Manspeaker formed Green Jellö, a four-piece comedy-punk band, in 1981. As most of the band's members were poor musicians at the time, they billed themselves as "The World's Worst Band".

In 1984, Green Jellö released Let It Be, an eight-song EP, on their own label, American Jello Parti Productions, Inc. The cover artwork (designed by Manspeaker) was a parody of The Beatles' Let It Be album cover. Recorded in Manspeaker's bedroom and at a local band rehearsal hall, the album featured the "Green Jellö Theme Song" as well as early songs such as "I've Got Poo-Poo on My Shoe" (later called "Shitman"), "Whip Me Teenage Babe" (later renamed "House Me Teenage Rave"), "Hill, Hill", "Do the Howie", the one-second "Icrog", "The Ice Cream Song", and "I'll Buy You Any Major Appliance You Want Baby, Ooo Ooo".

In 1989, Green Jellö released their second album, Triple Live Möther Gööse at Budokan, on February 29 Records, which was recorded in a garage with producer Sylvia Massy.

=== Cereal Killer (1991–1993) ===
In 1991, Green Jellö approached the BMG subsidiary label Zoo Entertainment with a video-only album concept. In 1992, they delivered Cereal Killer, again produced by Massy. The album is a long-form video consisting of music videos for each song, as well as a behind-the-scenes feature. Zoo eventually issued the EP Green Jellö SUXX, consisting of four songs from Cereal Killer, including "Three Little Pigs". The band then issued the full-length studio album Cereal Killer Soundtrack in March 1993. This was their first release under the revised name Green Jellÿ.

The video for "Three Little Pigs" was directed by Fred Stuhr (who also directed Tool's "Sober" video), and it featured a claymation rendition of the classic fairy tale with modern twists, such as pot-smoking pigs, an appearance by Rambo, and a Harley Davidson-riding wolf. The video was No. 17 for most of the summer of 1993 in the US and received both an MTV music award and Billboard music award nomination. The song entered the UK Singles Chart at a peak position of No. 5. Cereal Killer Soundtrack attained gold status in the US, New Zealand, and Canada, as well as platinum in Australia. In 1993, they released the single "Electric Harley House (of Love)", with the video featuring Gene Simmons and Paul Stanley from Kiss. Later the same year, the band released a single that was never included on any of their full-length albums: a collaboration with Hulk Hogan, performing Gary Glitter's "I'm the Leader of the Gang (I Am)", which became a Top-40 hit in the UK.

=== 333 (1994–1995) ===
In 1994, Green Jellÿ opened Green Jellÿ Studios, an audiovisual production house to create music videos for other artists, as well as pieces for television and film. The same year, the band recorded and filmed their fourth album, 333. The record featured differing styles, from thrash metal to grunge rock to dance music. It failed to chart, although the single "The Bear Song" appeared in the Farrelly Brothers film Dumb and Dumber. The related video album received a 1995 Grammy nomination for best long-form video.

Also in 1994, Green Jellÿ wrote and produced the soundtrack for the Acclaim Entertainment video game Spider-Man & Venom: Maximum Carnage. The soundtrack is a computerized rendition of original songs.

=== Reunion and Musick to Insult Your Intelligence By (2008–2009) ===
On February 19, 2008, music news website Blabbermouth.net announced that Green Jellÿ was reuniting and that a possible US tour was in the works. The band also re-released the Cereal Killer and 333 video albums on a self-produced DVD with Originology Records, which were only sold at concerts. They released a new record, Musick to Insult Your Intelligence By, on October 13, 2009.

=== Touring and new releases (2010–present) ===
Green Jellÿ released a DVD on December 1, 2016, titled GREEN JELLO Suxx Live: An Experience in Ridiculousness (later retitled Green Jellÿ Suxx Live: An Experience in Ridiculousness). They toured throughout 2017 in support of the film and its soundtrack. In 2018, The Official Soundtrack of the Documentary Green Jellÿ Suxx Live was released via Enjoy the Ride Records.

In 2017, Green Jellÿ released a new music video and single, "Fr3tö F33t". In 2018, they issued their first Christmas song, "Green Jellÿ Xmas". In 2019, they released another single, titled "Silence of the Sponge", a macabre parody of the theme to SpongeBob SquarePants.

Green Jellÿ's fifth studio album, titled Garbage Band Kids, was released on June 11, 2021, on Cleopatra Records.

== Band members ==
Current

- Bill Manspeaker – vocals (1981–1995, 2008–present)
- Lazy D – vocals
- Jella Lugosi – lead guitar
- Tekatesha – bass guitar
- Hammy Hagar – rhythm guitar

Notable former members

- Maynard James Keenan – backing vocals (1990–1993)
- Danny Carey – drums (1989–1994)

== Discography ==
=== Studio albums ===
- Triple Live Möther Gööse at Budokan (1989)
- Cereal Killer Soundtrack (1993)
- 333 (1994)
- Musick to Insult Your Intelligence By (2009)
- Garbage Band Kids (2021)

=== Live albums ===
- The Official Soundtrack of the Documentary Green Jellÿ Suxx Live (2018)

=== EPs ===
- Let It Be (1984)
- Green Jellö SUXX (1992)
- Three Little Pigs – The Remixes (1993)
- Freetoe Feet Presents: A Green Jellÿ Xmas Soundtrack (2023)

=== Video albums ===
- Cereal Killer (1992)
- 333 (1994)
- Green Jellÿ Suxx Live: An Experience in Ridiculousness (2016)

=== Singles ===
- "Three Little Pigs" (1992)
- "Anarchy in the U.K." (1993)
- "Electric Harley House (of Love)" (1993)
- "I'm the Leader of the Gang (I Am)" (1993)
- "House Me Teenage Rave" (1993)
- "Three Little Pigs" (1993 re-release)
- "The Bear Song" (1994)
- "Slave Boy" (1994)
- "Fr3tö F33t" (2017)
- "Khaos: Destroyer of the Universe" (2017)
- "Trumpty Dumpty" (2017)
- "Carnage Rules" (2018)
- "Green Jellÿ Xmas" (2018)
- "Silence of the Sponge" (2019)
- "Seeing Snakes/Green Jellÿ" split (2019)
- "Eat Santa's Ham" (2023)
- "Murder Train" (2024)
