= E.M.I. (song) =

1977 song by Sex Pistols

Song by Sex Pistols

from the album Never Mind the Bollocks, Here's the Sex Pistols
- Released: 28 October 1977
- Recorded: March 1977
- Studio: Wessex, London, England
- Genre: Punk rock
- Length: 3:10
- Label: Virgin (UK); Warner Bros. (US)
- Songwriters: Paul Cook; Steve Jones; Glen Matlock; Johnny Rotten
- Producers: Chris Thomas; Bill Price

"E.M.I." is a song on the Sex Pistols' 1977 debut, and sole album, Never Mind the Bollocks, Here’s the Sex Pistols. It was written after the group's contract with record label EMI had been terminated on 6 January 1977 after only three months, following the publicity storm caused by their appearance on the Today programme in December 1976. The song, often called a diss track, mocks the label for wanting to cash in on the growing punk phenomenon and sign the band, only to drop them when the group's antics damaged the label's reputation. The song was first recorded the same month at Gooseberry Studios, in Glen Matlock's last recording session with the band before his departure, but the version that appears on the album was a re-recording made two months later at Wessex Studios. It was first played live at Notre Dame Hall, London, on 21 March 1977.

Paste called the song "the group's middle finger salute aimed at the record industry and label that fired them out of fear of their lyric content". The Sex Pistols' lead singer Johnny Rotten described "E.M.I." as "one of my faves" in his 1994 autobiography Rotten: No Irish, No Blacks, No Dogs and in 2017 he told Rolling Stone, "EMI wanted to sign us to show what a grand, varied label they were, but they really were not. This song was fun to write. It was actually mostly done in the studio because the groove was there, and it was relentless." The Independent has described the song as ranking "alongside Graham Parker's "Mercury Poisoning" as the most gleeful rant at a record company ever recorded."
