= The Punk Singles Collection =

Compilation album by Peter and the Test Tube Babies
- Released: 1995
- Recorded: 1980 – 1985
- Genre: Punk rock
- Length: 76:10
- Label: Anagram
- Producer: Various

Peter and the Test Tube Babies chronology
Supermodels (1995)	The Punk Singles Collection (1995)	Alien Pubduction (1998)

The Punk Singles Collection is a compilation album released in 1995 by Anagram Records. It contained material recorded between 1980 and 1985 by the English punk rock band, Peter and the Test Tube Babies.

The album contains all their early singles and EP tracks in this time period in chronological order. Anagram Records also re-released a number of the band's albums, including their debut album – the live Pissed and Proud from 1982.

The Punk Singles Collection is a record series released by anagram records detailing the singles produced by many UK punk bands such as Special Duties, The Lurkers and small-time record companies such as Small Wonder, who released bands such as the Carpettes upon the world, and Abstract records, who signed the gymslips.
