= Revolution in the Classroom =

1989 single by Ex Pistols

Single by Ex Pistols (as Sex Pistols)
- B-side: "Schools are Prisons"
- Released: 1989
- Genre: Punk rock
- Length: 3:27
- Label: STP Records
- Producer: Dave Goodman

Ex Pistols (as Sex Pistols) singles chronology
"Land of Hope and Glory" (1984)	"Revolution in the Classroom" (1989)

"Revolution in the Classroom" was a single released by the Ex Pistols; despite its packaging, the record has nothing to do with the Sex Pistols. The single was released in 1989 on the STP Records label, pressed on various colours of vinyl. The song, along with its B-side "Schools Are Prisons", were both included on the Ex-Pistols album, Deny. They also appear disguised as genuine Sex Pistols recordings on two Sex Pistols retrospective albums by former producer Dave Goodman, Pirates of Destiny (I Swirled Records, 1989) and We Have Cum For Your Children (Skyclad Records, 1988). Under the title "Revolution" the song appears on a German Sex Pistols compilation "Anarchy in the USA" from 1992 released on MBC records. CD 084-60322 LP 008-60321
