= 333 (Green Jellÿ album) =

1994 studio album by Green Jellÿ

Studio album by Green Jellÿ
- Released: September 27, 1994
- Recorded: 1993–1994
- Length: 36:42
- Label: Zoo
- Producer: Green Jellÿ

Green Jellÿ chronology
Three Little Pigs - The Remixes (1993)	333 (1994)	Musick to Insult Your Intelligence By (2009)

Singles from 333
- 1. "The Bear Song" Released: 1994; 2. "Slave Boy" Released: 1994

Professional ratings
Review scores
Source	Rating
AllMusic	2/5 stars
Entertainment Weekly	C−

333 is the second studio album and a video album by American comedy rock band Green Jellÿ. It was released on September 27, 1994, through Zoo Entertainment.

Only 200,000 copies of the album were printed and only 5,000 copies of the video. The album failed to chart, and both versions are very difficult to find today.

A long-form video for the album was never properly released; thus, it is extremely difficult to find. Despite this, the new video album did receive a 1995 Grammy nomination for best long-form video.

== Track listing ==
No.	Title	Length
1.	"Carnage Rules"	3:32
2.	"Orange Krunch"	3:35
3.	"Piñata Hed"	3:53
4.	"Fixation"	2:22
5.	"The Bear Song"	2:42
6.	"Fight"	2:05
7.	"Super Elastic"	2:40
8.	"Jump"	4:03
9.	"Jerk"	2:59
10.	"Anthem"	5:52
11.	"Slave Boy"	2:59
Total length:		36:42

== In popular culture ==
- "The Bear Song" was featured in the movie Dumb and Dumber.
- "Carnage Rules" was used as the theme song of the 1994 Spider-Man videogame Spider-Man and Venom: Maximum Carnage; the song itself is based on the Marvel Comics character Carnage.
- Former member Maynard James Keenan appears as "Billy Bob" in the "Slave Boy" video.
- Renowned parody musician, and future Volcano Records labelmate, "Weird Al" Yankovic makes a cameo in the music video for "Anthem", along with Kiss members Gene Simmons and Paul Stanley.
