= Three Little Pigs (song) =

1992 single by Green Jellÿ

Single by Green Jellÿ

from the album Cereal Killer, Green Jellö SUXX and Cereal Killer Soundtrack
- B-side: "Obey the Cowgod"
- Released: March 8, 1993
- Genre: Comedy rock; heavy metal; rap metal
- Length: 5:53
- Label: Zoo Entertainment
- Songwriters: Marc Levinthal; Bill Manspeaker
- Producer: Sylvia Massy

Green Jellÿ singles chronology
"Three Little Pigs" (1993)	"Anarchy in Bedrock" (1993)

Music video
- "Three Little Pigs" on YouTube

"Three Little Pigs" is a song by American comedy rock band Green Jellÿ from their first video album, Cereal Killer (1992). Released by Zoo Entertainment in 1992 with the original band name, Green Jellö, the song was re-released as a single in March 1993, under the name Green Jellÿ due to a lawsuit for trademark infringement by the owners of Jell-O. The song is a modern re-telling of the classic fable The Three Little Pigs, featuring references such as marijuana, Harley-Davidson, and Rambo.

The song peaked at number 17 on the US Billboard Hot 100 in June 1993, staying on the listing for 20 weeks, and charted at number five in the United Kingdom. It additionally reached number one in New Zealand for two nonconsecutive weeks and charted highly in several European countries. The chart success can be partly attributed to the song's unique and heavily aired music video. "Three Little Pigs" was ranked number 35 on VH1's 40 Most Awesomely Bad Metal Songs...Ever.

== Writing and composition ==
Written by Marc Levinthal and Bill Manspeaker after a "late-night drinkfest" at Zatar's in Hollywood, the song is a re-telling of the classic fairy tale Three Little Pigs, with modern twists—the straw-builder pig escaped the farm where he was raised to begin a new life in Los Angeles, the stick-builder pig is a marijuana-smoking, Bob Marley-listening, dumpster diving hippie and preacher from Venice Beach, and the third pig is the son of rock star Pig Nugent (an allusion to Ted Nugent) with a master's degree in architecture from Harvard College who builds his concrete mansion in Hollywood Hills. The third pig dispatches the Harley-riding Big Bad Wolf by calling 911, who in turn call in Rambo, who mows the wolf down with a machine gun.

== Critical reception ==
In his weekly UK chart commentary, James Masterton wrote, "From straight out of nowhere to land in the Top 5 comes the surprise of the week. Who would have thought a tongue in cheek grunge rap retelling the old nursery tale would cross over so dramatically. Here it is though, and may well go Top 3 next week, aided in part by the clever plasticine animated video which accompanies the track." Andy Martin from Music Week named the song Pick of the Week in the category of Rock, giving it four out of five. He added, "The excellent and hilarious promo that accompanies this bastardisation of the porcine children's tale (like Creature Comforts on acid) should win TV coverage and propel the weird, wacky and wonderful Green Jelly to stardom, or at least a Top 20 hit single. Expect BMG to pull out all the stops on this one." John Harris from NME declared it as "undoubtedly a near-classic novelty record". Tony Cross from Smash Hits also gave "Three Little Pigs" four out of five, commenting, "This heavy metal (should that be mental?) version of the little pig fairy-tale is weird indeed (and sports a flippin' smart video too). Full throttle crash and trash guitars bring the story right up to date, complete with hilarious high-pitched voices for the pigs (not by the hair of our chinny chin chin!), and torrents of sound for the big bad wolf. A rock opera that deserves a listen."

== Music video ==
The song's accompanying stop motion claymation music video received regular rotation on MTV, and in 1993 it was certified gold by the RIAA. "Three Little Pigs" was notable for being the first known music single to debut only in video form; when the music video was first shown on MTV, fans could buy the song on videotape, but not on CD. In 1993, however, the single was finally released in CD form. The music video was later made available by Vevo on YouTube in 2014 and had generated more than 37 million views as of August 2025.

== Track listings ==
- US 7"-single
1. "Three Little Pigs" (edit) - 4:17
2. "Electric Harley House (Of Love)" - 4:37
- UK CD-single
1. "Three Little Pigs" (edit) – 4:29
2. "Three Little Pigs" (full-length version) – 5:54
3. "Obey the Cowgod" – 3:09

== Personnel ==
- Bill Manspeaker (as Moronic Dicktator) – vocals
- Les Claypool – guest voice of Three Little Pigs
- Maynard James Keenan – guest voice of Three Little Pigs
- Pauly Shore – guest voice of Three Little Pigs
- Gary Helsinger (as Hotsy Menshot) – voice of Rambo
- C.J. Buscaglia (as Jesus Quisp) – guitars, producer
- Steven Shenar (as Sven Seven) – guitars
- Michael Bloomquist (as Rootin') – bass
- Joe Russo (as Mother Eucker) – bass
- Danny Carey (as Danny Longlegs) – drums

== Charts ==
=== Weekly charts ===
Chart (1993)	Peak position
Australia (ARIA)	6
Austria (Ö3 Austria Top 40)	18
Belgium (Ultratop 50 Flanders)	12
Denmark (IFPI)	18
Europe (Eurochart Hot 100)	24
Germany (GfK)	12
Ireland (IRMA)	8
Israel (Israeli Singles Chart)	18
Netherlands (Dutch Top 40)	15
Netherlands (Single Top 100)	11
New Zealand (Recorded Music NZ)	1
Norway (VG-lista)	7
Portugal (AFP)	5
Sweden (Sverigetopplistan)	3
Switzerland (Schweizer Hitparade)	33
UK Singles (Official Charts)	5
UK Airplay (ERA)	54
US Billboard Hot 100	17
US Cash Box Top 100	16

=== Year-end charts ===
Chart (1993)	Position
Australia (ARIA)	26
Europe (Eurochart Hot 100)	81
Germany (Media Control)	70
Netherlands (Dutch Top 40)	88
Netherlands (Single Top 100)	92
New Zealand (RIANZ)	12
Sweden (Topplistan)	22
UK Singles (OCC)	69
US Billboard Hot 100	93

== Certifications ==
Region	Certification	Certified units/sales
Australia (ARIA)	Platinum	70,000^{^}
New Zealand (RMNZ)	Platinum	10,000^{*}
United States (RIAA)	Gold	700,000
^{*} Sales figures based on certification alone.^{^} Shipments figures based on certification alone.

== Release history ==
Region	Date	Format(s)	Label(s)	Ref.
United States	March 8, 1993	7-inch vinyl; cassette	Zoo Entertainment	
United Kingdom	May 24, 1993	7-inch vinyl; 12-inch vinyl; CD; cassette	Zoo Entertainment	
United States	May 25, 1993	VHS	Zoo Entertainment	
Australia	July 12, 1993	CD; cassette	Zoo Entertainment	
