= The Swindle Continues =

Studio album by Ex Pistols
- Released: 1988
- Genre: Punk rock
- Label: VAP Records
- Producer: Dave Goodman

Ex Pistols chronology
The Swindle Continues (1988)	Deny (1992)

The Swindle Continues is the first album released by the Ex Pistols in 1988. It consists of half Sex Pistols and half Ex Pistols material, and is the only Ex Pistols release that doesn't disguise itself as material completely by the Sex Pistols.

The Ex Pistols tracks on this album would all later appear on their Deny album, minus the exception of "The Swindle Continues", an exclusive track, "Sex On 45", a compilation of Sex Pistols music, "Here We Go Again/Silly Thing", two Steve Jones and Paul Cook demo recordings.

== Track listing ==
A-Side (Sex Pistols):

1. "God Save the Queen"
2. "Problems"
3. "Pretty Vacant"
4. "Liar"
5. "E.M.I"
6. "New York"
7. "No Fun"
8. "Anarchy in the U.K."

B-Side (Ex Pistols):

1. "Here We Go Again"
2. "Silly Thing" [Demo version]
3. "Dancing on the Dole"
4. "Anarchy in the U.K." (Acoustic Version)
5. "Revolution in the Classroom"
6. "Judging Minds"
7. "Sex on 45"
8. "The Swindle Continues"
