= Spunk/This Is Crap =

Spunk/This is Crap

Compilation album by Sex Pistols
- Released: 1996
- Recorded: 1976–1977
- Genre: Punk rock

Spunk/This is Crap is a rarities album by the English punk rock band The Sex Pistols. It was included with the 1996 reissue of Never Mind the Bollocks, Here's the Sex Pistols.

It features a reissue of the Spunk bootleg, without talking between tracks and with nine additional tracks.

== Track listing ==
1. "Seventeen"
2. "Satellite"
3. "No Feelings"
4. "I Wanna Be Me"
5. "Submission"
6. "Anarchy in the UK"
7. "God Save the Queen"
8. "Problems"
9. "Pretty Vacant"
10. "Liar"
11. "EMI"
12. "New York"
13. "Problems"
14. "No Feelings"
15. "Pretty Vacant"
16. "Submission"
17. "No Feelings"
18. "EMI"
19. "Satellite"
20. "Seventeen"
21. "Anarchy in the UK"

== Notes ==
- Tracks 1–4, 8–11 & 16 were not included in the Sex Pistols Box Set.
- Tracks 1–5 recorded at Dave Goodman sessions, Riverside/Denmark St, July 1976
- Track 6 recorded at Dave Goodman sessions, Wessex Studios, October '76
- Tracks 7–12 recorded at Dave Goodman sessions, Gooseberry Studios, January 1977
- Tracks 13–15 recorded at Chris Spedding sessions, Majestic Studios May 1976
- Tracks 16–20 recorded at Chris Thomas Never Mind the Bollocks… sessions, Wessex, summer 1977
- Track 21 recorded at Dave Goodman sessions, Riverside/Denmark St, July 1976
