= James Kinsley =

Scottish literary scholar

James Kinsley, FBA, FRSL (17 April 1922 – 24 August 1984) was a Scottish literary scholar.

== Biography ==
Born on 17 April 1922, Kinsley attended the Royal High School in Edinburgh and the University of Edinburgh. After graduating in 1943, he served in the Second World War. On demobilisation, he continued his studies at Oriel College, Oxford. Later in life, Kinsley studied to be a priest; he was ordained in 1963 and served as a curate in Beeston and from 1964 as a public preacher in the diocese of Southwell.

After graduating from Oxford in 1947, he took up a lectureship at the University College of Wales at Aberystwyth. He was then successively Professor of English Language and Literature at the University College of Swansea (1954–61) and Professor of English Studies at the University of Nottingham (1961–84).

Kinsley edited David Lyndsay's Ane Satyre of the Thrie Estaits (1954); wrote Scottish Poetry: A Critical Survey (1954); compiled The Poems of John Dryden, which appeared in 1958 in four volumes; and edited Squyer Meldrum by Lyndsay (1959), The Works of Virgil Translated by John Dryden (1961), The Poems and Fables of John Dryden (1962), Annals of the Parish by John Galt (1967), The Poems and Songs of Robert Burns (3 vols., 1968), The Oxford Book of Ballads (1969), Anecdotes and Characters of My Own Time by Alexander Carlyle (1973), and The Poems of William Dunbar (1979). He sometimes collaborated with his wife Helen, née Dawson, with whom he jointly edited Dryden: The Critical Heritage (1971). Between 1969 and 1977, he was editor of the Oxford English Novels and the Oxford English Memoirs and Travels series. He gave the Gregynog Lecture at Aberystwyth in 1963 and the British Academy's Warton Lecture in 1974, and was awarded the DLitt degree by the University of Edinburgh in 1959. He was elected a fellow of the Royal Society of Literature (1959) and of the British Academy (1971). He died on 24 August 1984.

In 1977, Kinsley was an expert witness at the obscenity trial for the Sex Pistols album Never Mind the Bollocks.
