= Barbarella's =

Nightclub in Birmingham, England

- Birmingham Barbarella's logo
- Interactive map of Barbarella's
- Address: 41 Cumberland Street; Birmingham; United Kingdom
- Location: Birmingham, United Kingdom
- Coordinates: 52°28′36″N 01°54′48″W
- Type: Nightclub
- Event: Rock

Construction
- Opened: 1972
- Closed: 1979
- Demolished: 1986

Barbarella's was a nightclub and music venue located in Birmingham, England. The name of the club was taken from the film Barbarella. The club opened in 1972 and closed in August 1979.

American acts Ike & Tina Turner, Del Shannon, and Junior Walker & the All Stars performed at Barbarella's in 1972.

This club was one of Eddie Fewtrell's clubs. Fewtrell promoted known rock bands at that time, such as AC/DC, Dire Straits, Queen, Sex Pistols and The Clash.

Duran Duran's drummer Roger Taylor played at Barbarella's with punk bands in the 1970s.

Both The Prefects and The Photos recorded a song called Barbarella's, the latter mourning the closure of the club.

1976-1978 concerts
Date	Year	Musician(s)	Tour	Note		
31 July	1976	AC/DC	--	]		
27 October	1976	AC/DC	1976	The Clash	--	Support Suburban Studs
13 November	--	Support Suburban Studs	1976	The Clash		
24 January	1978	--	--	The Clash		
1 May	1978	--	--	The Clash		
4 July	1978	Dire Straits	Dire Straits Tour	Left in the form of album Birmingham at Barbarella		
14 August	1978	Sex Pistols	--	Left in the form of song in the album Sex Pistols Box Set (Note: Information from Sex Pistols Box Set article)		
