= Cereal Killer (video) =

1992 video album by Green Jellö

Video (album) by Green Jellö
- Released: October 9, 1992
- Recorded: 1991–1992
- Genres: Comedy rock, heavy metal, punk rock
- Length: 59:21
- Label: Zoo Entertainment
- Producers: Sylvia Massy; C.J. Buscaglia

Green Jellö chronology
Triple Live Möther Gööse at Budokan (1989)	Cereal Killer (1992)	Green Jellö SUXX (1992)

Professional ratings
Review scores
Source	Rating
Music Week	2/5 stars

Cereal Killer is a video-only album released by comedy metal/punk group Green Jellö in 1992. The longform video was certified Gold by the RIAA. The entire album was later re-released as a CD in 1993 as Cereal Killer Soundtrack, which also received Gold certification by the RIAA.

== Track listing ==
No.	Title	Length
1.	"Green Jellö Theme Song"	2:15
2.	"Three Little Pigs"	5:54
3.	"Obey the Cowgod"	3:10
4.	"Trippin' on XTC"	3:42
5.	"Misadventures Of Shitman"	3:08
6.	"Electric Harley House (of Love)"	4:37
7.	"Flight Of The Skajaquada"	4:00
8.	"House Me Teenage Rave"	4:30
9.	"Cereal Killer"	3:30
10.	"Rock-N-Roll Pumpkin"	2:43
11.	"Anarchy in the U.K."	3:29
Total length:		59:21
