= Spunk Creek =

Stream in Minnesota, U.S.

Coordinates: 45°37′23.9″N 94°27′44.0″W

Spunk Creek is a stream in the U.S. state of Minnesota.

The creek's name comes from the Ojibwe Indians, for the spunk, or firewood, they collected in the area.

== See also ==
- List of rivers of Minnesota
