= Cereal Killer Soundtrack =

1993 studio / soundtrack album by Green Jellÿ

- Original cover with the "Green Jellö" name

Studio album / soundtrack album by Green Jellÿ
- Released: March 16, 1993
- Recorded: 1991–1993
- Genres: Comedy rock; heavy metal; punk rock
- Length: 40:53
- Label: Zoo
- Producers: Sylvia Massy; C.J. Buscaglia

Green Jellÿ chronology
Green Jellö SUXX (1991)	Cereal Killer Soundtrack (1993)	Three Little Pigs - The Remixes (1993)

Singles from Cereal Killer Soundtrack
- 1. "Three Little Pigs" Released: March 8, 1993; 2. "Electric Harley House (of Love)" Released: June 28, 1993; 3. "Anarchy in the U.K." Released: August 2, 1993; 4. "House Me Teenage Rave" Released: 1993

Professional ratings
Review scores
Source	Rating
AllMusic	4.5/5 stars
NME	6/10

Cereal Killer Soundtrack is the debut studio album by American comedy rock band Green Jellÿ. It was originally released on March 16, 1993, through Zoo Entertainment. The album is the soundtrack to the band's video album Cereal Killer (1992) and contains the song "Three Little Pigs", which became their most successful single. It is their last album released under the name Green Jellö, as subsequent legal action over the Jell-O trademark led to the band being rebranded as Green Jellÿ, resulting in later pressings of the album being reprinted with the new band name.

== Music and lyrics ==
The lyrics to the song "Obey the Cowgod" make a reference to Beefcake the Mighty, bass player for the band Gwar, who taught Green Jellÿ how to make their latex costumes.

== Release ==
Along with the popular "Three Little Pigs", the tracks "Electric Harley House (of Love)" and "Anarchy in the U.K." (a parody cover of the song by the Sex Pistols) were also released as singles from Cereal Killer Soundtrack throughout 1993.

=== Legal issues and re-release ===
Cereal Killer Soundtrack was initially released under the band name of Green Jellö. However, as their fame grew with the release of "Three Little Pigs", Kraft Foods Inc., owner of the Jell-O trademark, claimed that Green Jellÿ were in violation of the trademark, forcing a change of the band's name. As a result, an updated version of Cereal Killer Soundtrack was released bearing the Green Jellÿ name (also changing the name of the last track from "Green Jellö Theme Song" to "Green Jellÿ Theme Song") later in the same year.

In 1993, Green Jellÿ was sued by the management of Metallica for partial use of their song "Enter Sandman" in the song "Electric Harley House (of Love)". The bass and rhythm guitars in the solo section of the song play a riff close to that of "Enter Sandman", and even though the band mentions it in lyric immediately after the riff, the band was forced to remove the part from the later CD versions of Cereal Killer and pull the music video from MTV.

== Track listing ==
All tracks are written by Green Jellÿ, except where noted.

No.	Title	Writer(s)	Length
1.	"Obey the Cowgod"		3:10
2.	"Three Little Pigs"	Green Jellÿ; Levinthal	5:54
3.	"Cereal Killer" (Edit)		3:30
4.	"Rock-N-Roll Pumpkihn"		2:43
5.	"Anarchy in the U.K."	Paul Cook; Steve Jones; John Lydon; Glen Matlock	3:29
6.	"Electric Harley House (of Love)"		4:37
7.	"Trippin' on XTC"		3:42
8.	"Misadventures of Shitman"		3:08
9.	"House Me Teenage Rave"		4:30
10.	"Flight of the Skajaquada" (Edit)		4:00
11.	"Green Jellÿ Theme Song"		2:15
Total length:			40:53

== Personnel ==
- Bill Manspeaker (as Moronic Dicktator & Marshall Staxx) – vocals
- Joe Cannizzaro (as Dunderhed) – vocals
- Gary Helsinger (as Hotsy Menshot) – vocals
- Greg Reynard (as Reason Clean) – vocals
- Steven Shenar (as Sven Seven) – guitars
- Michael Bloomquist (as Rootin') – bass
- Joe Russo (as Mother Eucker) – bass
- Danny Carey (as Danny Longlegs) – drums
- Maynard James Keenan – guest voice of Three Little Pigs
- Kymmee O'Donnell (as Sadistica) – art direction, art producer, vocals on "House Me Teenage Rave"
- Caroline Jester (as Jella Tin) – vocals on "House Me Teenage Rave"
- C.J. Buscaglia – guitars, producer
- Lee Hammond – creative director
- Sylvia Massy – producer, engineer, mixing

== Charts ==
Chart (1993)	Peak position
Australian Albums (ARIA Charts)	77
USA The Billboard 200	23

== Certifications ==
Region	Certification	Certified units/sales
Canada (Music Canada)	Gold	50,000^{^}
United States (RIAA)	Gold	500,000^{^}
^{^} Shipments figures based on certification alone.
