= Peter and the Test Tube Babies =

English punk rock band

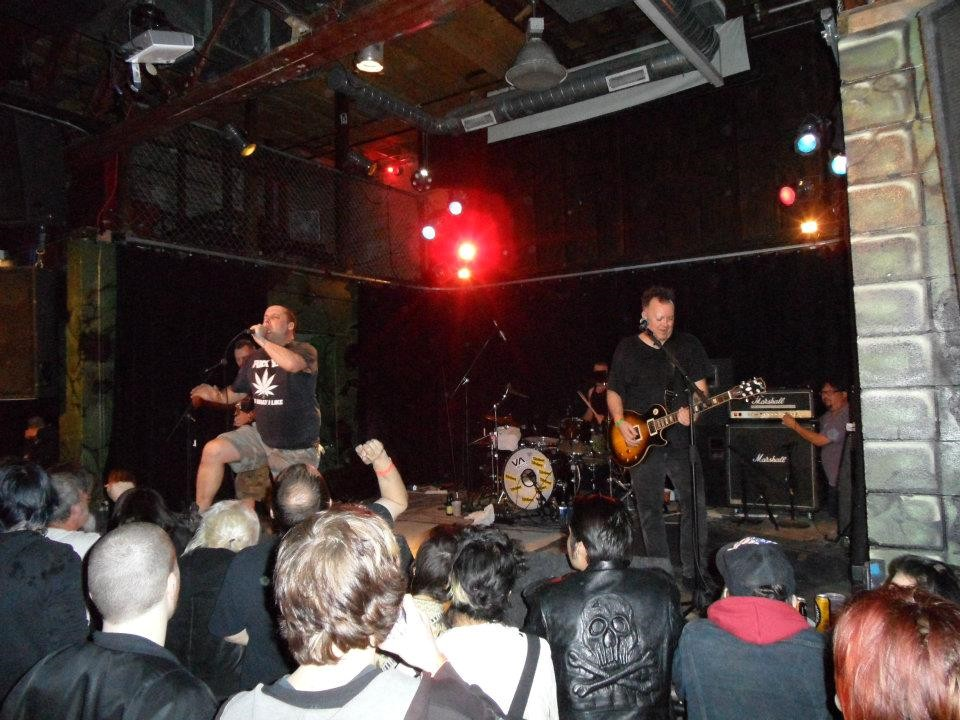
- Performing in Chicago, 2012

Background information
- Origin: Peacehaven, East Sussex, England
- Genres: Punk rock, oi!, punk pathetique
- Years active: 1978–present
- Labels: Captain Oi!, Profile, Dr. Strange, Cherry Red, Arising Empire, No Future, Anagram, Dojo
- Members: Peter Bywaters; Derek "Strangefish" Greening; Sam Fuller; Andy ‘Aggro’ Stenning; Michael ‘Tat’ Tatler
- Past members: Trapper; Trev Rutherford; Malcolm 'Mal' Clear; Mark "Ogs" Hoggins; Paul 'H' Henrickson; A.D. Rum; Christophe Sauniere; David 'Dave' O'Brien; Nick Abnett; Dave Kent
- Website: Official website

Peter and the Test Tube Babies are an English punk rock band, formed in Peacehaven, Sussex in 1978, by Derek "Strangefish" Greening and Peter Bywaters. Due to their humorous tongue-in-cheek lyrics, they have been considered part of the Punk pathetique subgenre.

== History ==
Peter and the Test Tube Babies were first featured in Sounds magazine in July 1980, and after a John Peel Radio One session, made their vinyl debut on the Brighton compilation album Vaultage 78.

In recent years the band has played at festivals including the 11th Antifest in 2005. They also had two songs on the Oi! compilation Oi! the Album in that same year. They favoured absurd lyrics and strange titles, such as "The Queen Gives Good Blow Jobs". In 1982, they covered the chart-topping Gary Glitter hit "I'm the Leader of the Gang (I Am)" on their album Pissed and Proud.

When the band is not touring, Bywaters offers English as a second language tuition on a live-in basis at his home in Brighton.

Strangefish currently hosts a punk rock radio show with Jimmy Skurvi of the Brighton punk band, Skurvi, on Brighton's Radio Reverb. The shows are also shown every week on his podcast page.

In 2017, Bywaters was refused entry and deported from the US; he stated that this occurred because he had imitated Donald Trump the previous year; U.S. Customs and Border Protection officials said it was because he had the wrong visa.

== Members ==
=== Current line-up ===
- Peter Bywaters — Vocals
- Derek "Strangefish" Greening — Guitar
- Michael ’Tat’ Tatler- Bass
- Sam Fuller — Drums
- Andy ‘Aggro’ Stenning - Guitar

=== Original line-up ===
- Peter Bywaters — Vocals
- Derek "Strangefish" Greening — Guitar
- Chris "Trapper" Marchant — Bass
- Trev Rutherford — Drums

== Discography ==
=== Albums ===
- Pissed and Proud, 1982
- The Mating Sounds of South American Frogs, 1983
- Journey to the Centre of Johnny Clarke's Head, 1984
- The Loud Blaring Punk Rock LP, 1985
- Soberphobia, 1986
- Live and Loud!! - More Chin Shouting, 1990
- The $hit Factory, 1990
- Cringe, 1991
- Supermodels, 1995
- Schwein Lake Live, 1996
- Alien Pubduction, 1998
- A Foot Full of Bullets, 2005
- Piss Ups, 2012
- That Shallot, 2017
- Fuctifano, 2020

=== EPs and singles ===
- "Banned From The Pubs", 1982
- "Run Like Hell", 1982
- 3 x 45, 1983
- The Jinx, 1983
- Zombie Creeping Flesh, 1983
- Pressed for Ca$h EP, 1984
- Rotting in the Fart Sack EP, 1985
- Key To The City, 1986
- Fuck The Millennium, 2000 (Free New Year's Eve Sampler)

=== Compilation appearances ===
- Vaultage 78, 1978
- Oi The Album "Rob A Bank (Wanna)" 1980
- The Kids Are United "Rob A Bank" 1981
- Carry On Oi "Transvestite", "Maniac"1981
- The Secret Life of Punks "Maniac" 1982
- Punk and Disorderly, 1982
- There Is No Future "Banned From The Pubs", "Up Yer Bum" 1984
- Angels With Dirty Faces "Banned From The Pubs", "Moped Lads" 1984
- Viva La Revolution "Run Like Hell" 1985
- The Best of Peter and the Test Tube Babies, 1988
- Oi Chartbusters Vol.5 "Transvestite" 1989
- Test Tube Trash, 1994
- The Punk Singles Collection, 1995
