= Pissed and Proud =

Live album by Peter and the Test Tube Babies
- Released: 1982
- Recorded: 28–30 August 1982; Hammersmith; Wood Green; Brighton
- Genre: Punk rock
- Length: 35:18
- Label: No Future Records; Anagram Records re-issue
- Producer: Barry Sage

Peter and the Test Tube Babies chronology
Pissed and Proud (1982)	Mating Sounds of South American Frogs (1983)

Pissed and Proud is an album of live recordings by English punk rock band Peter and the Test Tube Babies. It was originally released in 1982 on No Future Records and was recorded at three venues – Hammersmith, Wood Green, and their hometown, Brighton – during the August bank holiday of 1982.

Although previously the band had released a raft of singles, this was their first full-length album and was followed up by Mating Sounds of South American Frogs – their first full-length studio album – in 1983. This album includes a cover version of "I'm the Leader of the Gang" – a Gary Glitter song from 1973.

Many of these songs in their studio form were re-released on Anagram Records' compilation, The Punk Singles Collection in 1995.

== Track listing ==
All songs written by Del Strangefish and Peter Bywaters unless otherwise stated

1. "Moped Lads"/"Banned from the Pubs" – 4:20
2. "Elvis is Dead" – 2:03
3. "Up Yer Bum" – 1:51
4. "Smash 'n' Grab" (Bywaters, Greening, Marchant, Hoggins) – 2:53
5. "Run Like Hell" (Bywaters, Greening, Hoggins) – 3:05
6. "Shit Stirrer" (Bywaters, Greening, Marchant, Hoggins) – 2:55
7. "Intensive Care" – 2:36
8. "Keep Britain Untidy" (Bywaters, Greening, Marchant, Hoggins) – 2:47
9. "Transvestite" – 2:53
10. "Maniac" (Greening) – 2:35
11. "Disco" (Bywaters, Greening, Marchant) – 3:08
12. "I'm the Leader of the Gang" (Gary Glitter, Mike Leander) – 4:08

== Credits ==
- Peter Bywaters – vocals
- Del Strangefish – guitar
- "Trapper" Marchant – bass
- "Ogs" Hoggins – drums
- Recorded between 28 – 30 August 1982 (bank holiday weekend) in Hammersmith, Wood Green, and Brighton, UK
- Produced by Barry Sage
