= Never Mind the Bollocks, Here's the Sex Pistols =

- Original yellow UK variant

Studio album by Sex Pistols
- Released: 28 October 1977
- Recorded: October 1976; March–August 1977
- Studios: Wessex Sound, London
- Genres: Punk rock; hard rock
- Length: 38:44
- Labels: Virgin; Barclay (FR)
- Producers: Chris Thomas; Bill Price

Sex Pistols chronology
Never Mind the Bollocks, Here's the Sex Pistols (1977)	The Great Rock 'n' Roll Swindle (1979)

Singles from Never Mind the Bollocks, Here's the Sex Pistols
- 1. "Anarchy in the U.K." Released: 26 November 1976; 2. "God Save the Queen" Released: 27 May 1977; 3. "Pretty Vacant" Released: 1 July 1977; 4. "Holidays in the Sun" Released: 14 October 1977

Alternative cover
- Pink and green variant used in the US

Never Mind the Bollocks, Here's the Sex Pistols (often shortened to Never Mind the Bollocks) is the only studio album by the English punk rock band the Sex Pistols. It was released on 28 October 1977 through Virgin Records. As a result of the Sex Pistols' volatile internal relationships, the band's lineup saw changes during the recording of the album. Original bass guitarist Glen Matlock left the band early in the recording process. While he is credited as a co-writer on all but two of the tracks, Matlock played bass on only one track, "Anarchy in the U.K."

Recording sessions continued with a new bass player, Sid Vicious, who is credited on two of the songs written by the band after he joined. While Vicious's bass playing appeared on two tracks, his lack of skill on the instrument meant that many of the tracks were recorded with guitarist Steve Jones playing bass instead. Drummer Paul Cook, Jones and singer Johnny Rotten appear on every track. The various recording sessions were led alternately by Chris Thomas or Bill Price, and sometimes both together, but as the songs on the final albums often combined mixes from different sessions, and as it is unclear who of them was present in the recording booth each time, each song is jointly credited to both producers.

By the time of its release, the Sex Pistols were already controversial, having spoken profanity on live TV, been fired from two record labels, and been banned from playing live in some parts of Britain. The album title added to that controversy, with some people finding the word "bollocks" offensive. Many record stores refused to carry it and some record charts refused to list its title, showing just a blank space instead. Due in part to its notoriety, and in spite of many sales bans at major retailers, the album debuted at number one on the UK Album Charts. It achieved advance orders of 125,000 copies after a week of its release and went gold only a few weeks later, on 17 November. It remained a best-seller for nearly a year, spending 48 weeks in the top 75. The album has also been certified platinum by the RIAA.

The album has influenced many bands and musicians, and the industry in general. In particular, the album's raw energy, and Johnny Rotten's sneering delivery and "half-singing", are often considered game-changing. It is frequently listed as the most influential punk album, and one of the greatest and most important albums of all time. In 1987, Rolling Stone magazine named the album the second best of the previous 20 years, behind only the Beatles' Sgt. Pepper's Lonely Hearts Club Band. The same magazine ranked it 41st on their list of the 500 greatest albums of all time in 2003 and 2012, and 80th in 2020. In 2006, it was chosen by Time magazine as one of the 100 greatest albums ever.

== Production ==
=== Writing ===
John Lydon, Steve Jones and Paul Cook wrote the album's 12 tracks between August 1975 and June 1976, with Glen Matlock acting as a co-writer on most of the tracks, written before his departure in February 1977, and Sid Vicious co-writing the two written after his entry into the group.

The first track written by the group was 'Pretty Vacant,' and by their 6 November 1975 concert at Central Saint Martins College of Art and Design they had written 'Seventeen', which closed their set. The next day the group performed at The Holborn Central School of Art and debuted 'Pretty Vacant' and 'Submission'. On the 21st, they debuted the song 'New York'. By February 1976, the group had gained traction and debuted the song 'Problems' for their second encore on 14 February. Their setlists at this time were becoming more filled with their material and less reliant on covers, as their earlier shows had been. By 3 April, they were playing 'No Feelings' in concert, and on 20 July, debuted 'Anarchy In the U.K', which was seemingly influenced by Vivienne Westwood and Jamie Reid, the latter of whom had begun creating publicity material for the group that spring. By 14 August the group were performing 'Liar' live.

=== Recording ===
On 8 October 1976, EMI signed the group into a two-year contract. For EMI, they recorded "Anarchy in the U.K." and began sessions for the newly written "God Save the Queen" that month. On 26 November 1976, the group's first single was released to great commercial success. But due to the nature of the material and the band's image, they caused heavy controversy, and were dropped from the label on 6 January 1977.

In February 1977, founding member and original bassist Glen Matlock quit, reportedly over the lyrics to "God Save the Queen." Matlock had co-written a majority of the album's tracks and was replaced by Sid Vicious.

Close to completing a deal with A&M Records, in March 1977 the Sex Pistols entered Wessex Sound Studios to record with producer Chris Thomas and engineer Bill Price. New bassist Sid Vicious played on the tracks "Bodies" and "God Save the Queen", but his performing skills were not considered fit to record the full album, so the band asked manager Malcolm McLaren to convince previous bassist Glen Matlock to perform the instrument for the sessions. Matlock agreed on the condition that he was paid beforehand. When payment was not received, he declined to attend. As a result, Thomas asked guitarist Steve Jones to play bass so work could begin on the basic tracks. Jones' playing was so satisfactory that Thomas had him play the bass tracks for all the remaining songs recorded during the sessions.

Four tracks—writer Clinton Heylin suspected they were "God Save the Queen" (Thomas stated he and Price "gave up" trying to use Vicious' bass track), "Pretty Vacant", "E.M.I." and possibly "Did You No Wrong"—were recorded during the two days at Wessex, with "God Save the Queen" and "Pretty Vacant" receiving vocal tracking from Johnny Rotten and final mixing during the period. As a result of these sessions, Thomas and Price began work in earnest on what would become the Sex Pistols' full-length album. Four days after recording was completed, the Sex Pistols signed with A&M, yet on 16 March the label terminated the contract, and several thousand pressed copies of the forthcoming "God Save the Queen" single were destroyed.

Despite being dropped by A&M, McLaren instructed the Sex Pistols to continue work on the album. While McLaren pondered whether or not to sign the offer presented by Virgin Records, he signed a French deal for the group with Barclay Records in early May 1977. At the same time, the group resumed work with Thomas and Price. Thomas temporarily departed the session partway through (a timeframe Heylin places as sometime in late April and early May), leaving Price to produce what Thomas estimated as five songs. Heylin narrowed down the potential Bollocks tracks Price may have produced to "Liar", "New York", "No Feelings", "Problems", "Seventeen" and "Submission", in addition to the non-album track "Satellite".

Meanwhile, the Sex Pistols had been rejected by labels including CBS, Decca, Pye and Polydor, leaving only Virgin's offer. McLaren still hoped to sign with a major label, and posited issuing a one-off single with Virgin to increase the band's appeal to the larger record companies. Virgin owner Richard Branson refused, so on 18 May the Sex Pistols finally signed with Virgin. Two weeks later, the label rush-released "God Save the Queen" as a single. During promotion of the single, Rotten stated that work on the album was ongoing, and, obscuring Jones's assumption of bass duties, insisted that the bass performances on the in-progress album were split between Matlock "on the Chris Thomas tracks" and Vicious.

The band returned to the studio with Thomas and Price on 18 June to record "Holidays in the Sun", the first song they had written without Matlock. That night after visiting a nearby pub, Rotten, Thomas and Price were attacked by a group of men, and the incident made newspaper headlines the following Tuesday. That month an eleven-track preview of the album began circulating, first reviewed in the fanzine 48 Thrills. At this point, Rotten maintained that the forthcoming album would include no cover songs, and none of the Sex Pistols' previously released singles bar "Anarchy in the U.K.", which was out of print. With "Pretty Vacant"'s release as a single, it was due to be replaced on the track list. The Sex Pistols returned to Wessex once more that August to record a new song, "Bodies", that had Vicious on bass. "Bodies" contained a second bass track played by Steve Jones, with the final version of the song "leaving Sid's down low".

The time spent in the studio recording the album was, for Steve Jones, the "best part of being in the Pistols". Jones spent many hours doing guitar overdubs with producer Chris Thomas and—repudiating punk's occasional embrace of musical sloppiness—has stated that both he and drummer Paul Cook "weren't just having a laugh" and were "really dedicated in the studio".

During this time period, bassist Sid Vicious stumbled into the same recording room as rock band Queen. Vicious aimed an insult at lead singer Freddie Mercury, saying "Have you brought ballet to the masses, yet?" Mercury got up and responded, "Aren't you Simon Ferocious or something? What're you gonna do about it?", took him by the collar and threw him out of the room. Later, Queen's producer Roy Thomas Baker, had a word with the Pistols' engineer over an interruption by Johnny Rotten, saying, "One of the band members just crawled on all fours across our studio up to the side of the piano, said, 'Hello Freddie,' and left on all fours. Could you make sure he doesn't do it again?"

== Release ==
With the completion of "Bodies", the time came to finalise the album's track list. Though Jon Savage wrote there were three versions of each track available, Heylin states that alternative versions for only five tracks ("E.M.I.", "No Feelings", "Seventeen" and "Submission", plus an "album" mix of "Satellite") existed. It was not until 20 September that the track list was finalised, which Heylin said "suggests just how bogged down by the process they had become". Richard Branson spent the night deciding the track list and which versions to use, and included all the hits on the record, despite the objections of the band, McLaren's management company Glitterbest and most of Virgin. Due to the album's long completion time, the Sex Pistols and McLaren decided to release "Holidays in the Sun" backed with "Satellite" as the band's fourth single. "Holidays in the Sun" was not as successful as past singles—it charted at number eight and dropped out of the top 20 after four weeks—which Heylin attributed to the group's announcement that their album would be released on 4 November and that the single would be included on the LP, despite previous statements to the contrary. In an attempt to stem criticism over the decision to include all four previously released Sex Pistols singles on the forthcoming LP, Virgin indicated the possibility of an "alternative album" being issued simultaneously, featuring a new title and two new songs replacing "two of the former hit singles". A label spokesman stated, "We've put the singles on the LP because most people wanted it that way. But the alternative set would enable us to overcome the multiple stores' ban". A ten-song test pressing was made, though no new cuts were included, with "Satellite" and "Submission" being added as bonus tracks.

The Sex Pistols' contract with Virgin stated that its music would be distributed by Virgin in the United States provided Branson matched any competing offers McLaren received. However, McLaren wanted to negotiate separate deals in every territory, regardless of what the contract stipulated, which angered Branson, as the clause for American distribution was an important one he had fought for. Branson knew he had been outmanoeuvred by McLaren, for he could not sue to enforce the contract or else be perceived as acting like EMI or A&M. Competition for the band in the United States narrowed down to Warner Bros., Arista, Columbia and Casablanca Records, with Warner Bros. signing the band on 10 October for £22,000.

Before Virgin could release Never Mind the Bollocks, Branson discovered that two other Sex Pistols albums were competing with his label's. In October, a bootleg named Spunk featuring high-quality recordings of Sex Pistols demos and recording sessions with Dave Goodman was released on a label called Blank. Among the rumours of who was behind the release of the tapes included Goodman, Glen Matlock and McLaren, who has always considered Goodman's versions to be a more accurate representation of the band. Meanwhile, the French pressing of Never Mind the Bollocks on Barclay had added "Submission" to the slated 11-song track list, and was due for release a week before Virgin's edition. As McLaren's separate deal with Barclay meant that the French release could not be halted and given the Virgin head was aware of how easy it was for import records to arrive in Britain, Branson rushed production of Never Mind the Bollocks to ensure it would come out a week earlier than intended. Nevertheless, the Barclay version was already available in the UK at the time Virgin had its version ready. Ten thousand copies of Virgin's pressing erroneously only listed 11 tracks on the sleeve yet contained 12 on the actual record.

Even with the availability of Spunk, the release of Never Mind the Bollocks, Here's the Sex Pistols was eagerly awaited in the United Kingdom. With advance orders of 125,000 copies, Never Mind the Bollocks debuted at number one on the UK Album Charts the week after its release. A ban of the album enacted by major retailers resulted in the record selling well through independent vendors instead.

== Title, packaging and obscenity case ==
The album was originally going to be titled God Save Sex Pistols. Jamie Reid's cover concept refrained from including a picture of the group and instead was dayglo red and yellow in colour with cutout lettering and a finish resembling crude screen-prints while the US version was pink with a green Sex Pistols logo. The album's title changed in mid-1977, based on a phrase supplied by Steve Jones. Jones said he picked up the phrase "Never mind the bollocks" from two fans who would always say it to one another. Johnny Rotten explained its meaning as a working-class expression to "stop talking rubbish".

In the United Kingdom, the album was subject to what Heylin described as "blatant acts of censorship exercised by media and retail outlets alike". London police visited the city's Virgin record store branches and told them they faced prosecution for indecency as stipulated by the 1899 Indecent Advertisements Act if they continued to display posters of the album cover in their windows. The displays were either toned down or removed. However, on 9 November 1977 (just two days before the album was released in the US), the London Evening Standard announced on its front-page headline "Police Move in on Punk Disc Shops", and reported how a Virgin Records shop manager in Nottingham was arrested for displaying the record after being warned to cover up the word "bollocks". Chris Seale, the shop's manager, "it would appear, willingly set himself up as a target, possibly at Branson's behest", according to Heylin, who noted that he had been visited by the police on four occasions and resumed displaying copies of the record in the store windows after they had left on each occasion. After Seale's arrest, Branson announced that he would cover the manager's legal costs and hired Queen's Counsel John Mortimer as defence. Meanwhile, advertisements for Never Mind the Bollocks appearing in music papers attempted to politicise the issue, showing newspaper headlines about Sex Pistols controversies that were underlined with the message "THE ALBUM WILL LAST. THE SLEEVE MAY NOT."

The obscenity case was heard at Nottingham Magistrates' Court on 24 November. Mortimer presented the case as a matter of police discrimination. During his cross-examination of the arresting officer, he asked why the newspapers The Guardian and Evening Standard (which had referred to the album's name) had not been charged under the same act. When the overseeing magistrate inquired about his line of questioning, Mortimer stated that a double standard was apparently at play, and that "bollocks" was only considered obscene when it appeared on the cover of a Sex Pistols album. The prosecutor conducted his cross-examination "as if the album itself, and not its lurid visage, was on trial for indecency", according to Heylin. Mortimer produced an expert witness, Professor James Kinsley, Head of the School of English at the University of Nottingham, who argued that the word "bollocks" was not obscene, and was actually a legitimate Old English term formerly used to refer to a priest, and which, in the context of the title, meant "nonsense". Lawyer Geoffrey Robertson, who appeared with Mortimer, recalled the professor saying that early English translations of the Bible used "bollocks" to refer to testicles, this being replaced by the word "stones" in the King James Version of the Bible, at which point Rotten handed Robertson a note saying, "Don't worry. If we lose the case, we'll retitle the album Never Mind the Stones, Here's the Sex Pistols". The chairman of the hearing concluded:

Much as my colleagues and I wholeheartedly deplore the vulgar exploitation of the worst instincts of human nature for the purchases of commercial profits by both you and your company, we must reluctantly find you not guilty of each of the four charges.

== Legacy ==
Retrospective professional ratings
Review scores
Source	Rating
AllMusic	5/5 stars
Christgau's Record Guide	A
Classic Rock	10/10
Encyclopedia of Popular Music	5/5 stars
The Guardian	5/5 stars
Mojo	5/5 stars
Q	5/5 stars
The Rolling Stone Album Guide	5/5 stars
Spin Alternative Record Guide	10/10
Uncut	8/10

In Christgau's Record Guide: Rock Albums of the Seventies, Village Voice critic Robert Christgau reviewed Never Mind the Bollocks:

"Get this straight: no matter what the chicmongers want to believe, to call this band dangerous is more than a suave existentialist compliment. They mean no good. It won't do to pass off Rotten's hatred and disgust as role-playing—the gusto of the performance is too convincing. Which is why this is such an impressive record. The forbidden ideas from which Rotten makes songs take on undeniable truth value, whether one is sympathetic ('Holidays in the Sun' is a hysterically frightening vision of global economics) or filled with loathing ('Bodies,' an indictment from which Rotten doesn't altogether exclude himself, is effectively anti-abortion, anti-woman, and anti-sex). These ideas must be dealt with, and can be expected to affect the way fans think and behave. The chief limitation on their power is the music, which can get heavy occasionally, but the only real question is how many American kids might feel the way Rotten does, and where he and they will go next. I wonder—but I also worry."

In 1983, the Bollock Brothers released a track-by track-cover version of the album, called Never Mind the Bollocks 1983.

In 1985, NME writers voted Never Mind the Bollocks, Here's the Sex Pistols the 13th greatest album of all time. In 1993, NME writers voted the album the third greatest of all time. In 1987, Rolling Stone magazine named it the second best album of the previous 20 years, behind only the Beatles' Sgt. Pepper's Lonely Hearts Club Band. The same magazine named it 41st on their list of the 500 greatest albums ever in 2003, maintaining the position in its updated 2012 list, but dropped to number 73 in a 2020 revision. In an interview during 2002, Rolling Stone journalist Charles M. Young stated:

Never Mind the Bollocks changed everything. There had never been anything like it before and really there's never been anything quite like it since. The closest was probably Nirvana, a band very heavily influenced by the Sex Pistols.

Kurt Cobain from Nirvana listed the album on his Top 50 favourite albums, and the title of Nirvana's second album, Nevermind, was inspired by the Sex Pistols' album, which angered Rotten at the time.

In 1997, Never Mind the Bollocks, Here's the Sex Pistols was named the 24th greatest album of all time in a Music of the Millennium poll conducted in the United Kingdom by HMV, Channel 4, The Guardian and Classic FM.

In 2000 it was voted number 29 in Colin Larkin's All Time Top 1000 Albums.

In 2005, the album was ranked number 276 in Rock Hard magazine's book The 500 Greatest Rock & Metal Albums of All Time. In 2006, it was chosen by Time magazine as one of the 100 greatest albums ever, and in the same year NME voted the album the fourth greatest British album. In 2024, Loudwire staff elected it as the best hard rock album of 1977.

Noel Gallagher was interviewed for a television programme called When Albums Ruled the World for the BBC, aired in early 2013. He said, of the album's opening with "Holidays in the Sun", "That is extremely provocative, what we can only assume is jackboots", which he followed by saying, "As soon as that starts, everything that has gone on before is now deemed fucking irrelevant, as soon as he (John Lydon) starts anti singing." He then said of "Pretty Vacant", "One of the 1st things you learn when you pick up the electric guitar is that riff." He then further commented, "I made 10 albums and in my mind they don't match up to that, and I'm an arrogant bastard. I'd give them all up to have written that, I truly would." In 2015, the album was inducted into the Grammy Hall of Fame.

== Reissues ==
In 1996, Virgin reissued Never Mind the Bollocks as a double CD with the original 'Spunk' bootleg album as Spunk/This Is Crap.

On 29 October 2007, Virgin released a special 30th-anniversary edition of the album in 180-gram vinyl LP format. The set included a 7-inch insert of "Submission" and poster, as originally released on 28 October 1977. Virgin also reissued the group's four singles, "Anarchy in the U.K.", "God Save the Queen", "Pretty Vacant" and "Holidays in the Sun", on 7-inch vinyl, before the album reissue.

In the US and Canada, these re-releases were handled by Warner Bros., which originally released the album in North America and (as of 2017) still owns the regional copyright to the album.

A four-disc boxed set reissue occurred on 24 September 2012. The set includes the original album, which for the first time was digitally remastered from the original master tapes, on disc one. The sound quality of this remaster is thus a significant improvement over all other reissues. The remastering process was overseen by original producer Chris Thomas. The second disc comprises all but one of the band's officially released B-sides (omitting "I Wanna Be Me"), which were also remastered. This disc also includes outtakes and demos from the recording sessions for 'NMTB', most notably the studio demo of "Belsen Was A Gas", which had been recently rediscovered and was previously thought lost forever. The third disc contains two live recordings from 1977 (Including the previously unreleased complete soundboard recording of their performance at the Happy House in Stockholm, Sweden on 28 June 1977). The fourth and final disc is a DVD of live and studio videos – as well as audio interviews from 1977. Also included is a full size 100 page hard cover, full color coffee table book which contains rare pictures, articles, and interviews that provides a timeline of the band throughout 1977. Additionally the set includes a full size replica "subway" promotional 'NMTB' poster, replicas of original promo stickers, a re-print of John Lydon's original hand-written lyrics to "God Save The Queen", and a replica of the original A&M copy of the "God Save the Queen" single. This UMG box set (SEXPISSBOX1977) and the 2002 Virgin box set (SEXBOX1) together contain almost the entire Sex Pistols studio/demo sessions – omitting only three of the June 1976 Dave Goodman demos which can be found on the 2006 officially released remaster of the "Spunk" bootleg.

In 2015, as part of Record Store Day, the album was re-issued as a picture disc, reaching number 7 in the UK'S Top 40 Vinyl Album Chart.

== Track listing ==
=== 11-track version (UK edition) ===
All tracks are written by Paul Cook, Steve Jones, Glen Matlock and Johnny Rotten except where noted.

Side one
No.	Title	Writer(s)	Length
1.	"Holidays in the Sun"	Cook, Jones, Rotten, Sid Vicious	3:22
2.	"Liar"		2:41
3.	"No Feelings"		2:53
4.	"God Save the Queen"		3:20
5.	"Problems"		4:11

Side two
No.	Title	Writer(s)	Length
6.	"Seventeen"		2:02
7.	"Anarchy in the U.K."		3:32
8.	"Bodies"	Cook, Jones, Rotten, Vicious	3:03
9.	"Pretty Vacant"		3:18
10.	"New York"		3:07
11.	"E.M.I."		3:10
Total length:			38:44

Note: According to a news item in Melody Maker prior to the album's release: "The first few thousand copies of the album will contain 'Submission' as a one-sided single, but for the rest of the 200,000 pressings the song will be included on the album."

=== 12-track version (UK edition) ===
Side one
No.	Title	Writer(s)	Length
1.	"Holidays in the Sun"	Cook, Jones, Rotten, Vicious	3:22
2.	"Bodies"	Cook, Jones, Rotten, Vicious	3:03
3.	"No Feelings"		2:53
4.	"Liar"		2:41
5.	"God Save the Queen"		3:20
6.	"Problems"		4:11

Side two
No.	Title	Length
7.	"Seventeen"	2:02
8.	"Anarchy in the U.K."	3:32
9.	"Submission"	4:12
10.	"Pretty Vacant"	3:18
11.	"New York"	3:07
12.	"E.M.I."	3:10

=== 12-track version (US edition) ===
Side one
No.	Title	Length
1.	"Holidays in the Sun"
2.	"Bodies"
3.	"No Feelings"
4.	"Liar"
5.	"Problems"
6.	"God Save the Queen"

Side two
No.	Title	Length
7.	"Seventeen"
8.	"Anarchy in the U.K."
9.	"Submission"
10.	"Pretty Vacant"
11.	"New York"
12.	"E.M.I."

=== 2012 remastered edition (Japan release) ===
Disc 1 – the original album & B-sides
No.	Title	Writer(s)	Length
1.	"Holidays in the Sun"	Cook, Jones, Rotten, Vicious	3:22
2.	"Bodies"	Cook, Jones, Rotten, Vicious	3:03
3.	"No Feelings"		2:53
4.	"Liar"		2:41
5.	"God Save the Queen"		3:20
6.	"Problems"		4:11
7.	"Seventeen"		2:02
8.	"Anarchy in the U.K."		3:32
9.	"Submission"		4:12
10.	"Pretty Vacant"		3:18
11.	"New York"		3:07
12.	"E.M.I."		3:10
13.	"No Feelings" (B-Side of A&M God Save the Queen)		2:46
14.	"Did You No Wrong" (B-Side of Virgin God Save the Queen)	Nightingale, Cook, Jones, Lydon and Matlock	3:11
15.	"No Fun" (B-Side of Pretty Vacant)	The Stooges	6:25
16.	"Satellite" (B-Side of Holidays in the Sun)		4:00
Total length:			51:17

Disc 2 – live 1977
No.	Title	Writer(s)	Length
1.	"Anarchy in the U.K."		3:51
2.	"I Wanna Be Me"		3:05
3.	"Seventeen"		2:21
4.	"New York"		3:24
5.	"E.M.I."		3:26
6.	"Submission"		4:05
7.	"No Feelings"		3:05
8.	"Problems"		4:34
9.	"God Save the Queen"		4:31
10.	"Pretty Vacant"		4:14
11.	"No Fun"	The Stooges	5:29
12.	"Problems"		3:41
13.	"No Fun"	The Stooges	5:32
14.	"Anarchy in the U.K."		3:33
Total length:			51:22

Notes

- Tracks 1–11 live at Happy House, Stockholm, Sweden, 28 July 1977
- Tracks 12–14 live at Penzance, Winter Gardens, Cornwall, 1 September 1977

== Personnel ==
Sex Pistols

- Johnny Rotten – lead vocals
- Steve Jones – guitar, bass on all tracks except for "Anarchy in the UK", backing vocals
- Paul Cook – drums
- Glen Matlock – bass on "Anarchy in the UK"
- Sid Vicious – partial bass on "Bodies" and "God Save the Queen"

Production

- Chris Thomas – producer
- Bill Price – producer, engineer
- Jon Walls – AIR Studios second engineer

== Charts ==
=== Weekly charts ===
Weekly chart performance for Never Mind the Bollocks, Here's the Sex Pistols
Chart (1977–1985)	Peak position
Australian Albums (Kent Music Report)	23
Dutch Albums (Album Top 100)	9
Swedish Albums (Sverigetopplistan)	12
New Zealand Albums (RMNZ)	27
Norwegian Albums (VG-lista)	11
UK Albums (Official Charts)	1
US Billboard 200	106
Chart (2000–2005)	Peak position
Spanish Albums (Promusicae)	100
UK Albums (Official Charts)	20
Chart (2012–2016)	Peak position
Belgian Albums (Ultratop Flanders)	181
Belgian Albums (Ultratop Wallonia)	125
French Albums (SNEP)	101
German Albums (Offizielle Top 100)	77
UK Albums (Official Charts)	24

=== Year-end charts ===
Year-end chart performance for Never Mind the Bollocks, Here's the Sex Pistols
Chart (1977)	Position
UK Albums (OCC)	12

== Certifications ==
Certifications for Never Mind the Bollocks, Here's the Sex Pistols
Region	Certification	Certified units/sales
Belgium (BRMA)	Gold	25,000^{*}
Italy (FIMI)	Gold	25,000^{‡}
Netherlands (NVPI)	Gold	50,000^{^}
Sweden (GLF)	Gold	50,000^{^}
United Kingdom (BPI)	2× Platinum	600,000^{*}
United States (RIAA)	Platinum	1,000,000^{^}
^{*} Sales figures based on certification alone.^{^} Shipments figures based on certification alone.^{‡} Sales+streaming figures based on certification alone.
