= Spunk (Sex Pistols bootleg album) =

- Official cover from 2006 release

Demo album (bootleg) by Sex Pistols
- Released: September or October 1977
- Recorded: 13–30 July 1976, 10–12 October 1976, 17–28 January 1977
- Genre: Punk rock
- Length: 40:56
- Label: Blank
- Producer: Dave Goodman

Professional ratings
Review scores
Source	Rating
Pitchfork Media	3.8/10
AllMusic	3/5

Spunk is a bootleg demo album by the English punk rock band the Sex Pistols. It was originally released in the United Kingdom during September or October 1977.

The album comprises studio demos and talking recorded with Dave Goodman during 1976 and early 1977, while original bass player Glen Matlock was still a member of the band. Most of the songs would later be re-recorded and officially released on the group's album, Never Mind the Bollocks, Here's the Sex Pistols.

== The alternative debut album ==
Several parties, including some journalists in the British music press, immediately suspected that the band's manager, Malcolm McLaren, was responsible for the original Spunk bootleg. This would have been in breach of the band's record contract with Virgin, which was readying the release of Never Mind the Bollocks when Spunk appeared. An October 1977 Sounds article by Chas de Whalley discussed Spunk and made reference to this conveniently coincidental timing. In the Sounds article, Chas de Whalley makes reference to buying a copy in a record store on the Portobello Road. It was in fact a tiny little record store (ACME Records) in the back of the now famous ACME Attractions. The shop assistant who dealt with de Whalley, identified in his article simply as "The Punk," was Doug McArthur, bassist for Killerhertz and Kid Rogers and the Henchmen. McArthur maintained the bootleg was a better quality record and claims to have sold many copies through that little record store.

The evidence for McLaren's involvement is speculative, although it can be noted that his company, Glitterbest, retained the rights to the demo recordings as well as the master tapes – and the demos appearing on Spunk were presented in excellent quality. Also, as evidenced by the original album's "LYN-" matrix number prefix, the record had clearly been pressed in the UK by Lyntone, a legitimate independent pressing plant that would presumably not handle anything that appeared to be a bootleg, and would certainly allow the bootlegger in question to be traced if enquiries had ever been made by the genuine copyright owner. McLaren always publicly denied responsibility for Spunk, but said that he preferred it to Never Mind the Bollocks.

During a BBC Radio 1 interview with rock journalist John Tobler on 12 November 1977, shortly after the release of Never Mind The Bollocks, both Johnny Rotten and Sid Vicious criticized the bootleg release and claimed that they hadn't received a free copy. Rotten, in particular, criticized the idea of people making money out of his efforts and commented that the material on the album was 'substandard, and should be kept unreleased'. When asked if he knew who was responsible for releasing the album, Rotten replied, "Yes...I'm not going to say...but I'll see him in court." When pressed further and asked if he was, in fact, going to sue, Rotten countered, "How can you? How can you catch them? How can you prove it?"

A week later, during a Radio Forth interview on the 19 November edition of the Edinburgh Rock Show, Johnny Rotten further criticized the bootleg release saying, "I don't like it. They were tapes that were never meant to be released, right? They were just us messing about in the studio and the fact that some #$%@ goes in and releases them on an album, makes me sick!" However, Rotten went on to contradict the statement he made the week prior, regarding the album's origins, by saying, "And I hope to find out who he is". When asked if he was receiving any royalties from the release, Rotten replied, "I'm getting not a penny! The music business is probably the most corrupt business in the world".

Some Sex Pistols fans concur with McLaren – and producer Goodman – that the raw versions of the songs on Spunk are superior to the officially released ones, particularly since Spunk approximates a faithful reproduction of the original Sex Pistols line-up's live sound. The album also features the bass-lines of Glen Matlock, which were not reproduced when guitarist Steve Jones took over bass duties for the recording of Never Mind the Bollocks.

Spunk is therefore often cited as the Sex Pistols' de facto alternative debut album. Certainly a tape of part or all of Spunk had been played to Tony Parsons as early as March 1977, and became the subject of his NME article, "Blank Nuggets in the UK", which described the recordings as if they represented an imminent debut album release.

== Reissues ==
The original Spunk was itself copied and bootlegged immediately upon release. The tracks have since been re-bootlegged countless times in many different formats, including a widespread variant called No Future UK?, which added three extra tracks, and many releases by Dave Goodman, which often feature evidence of remixing.

Spunk has also been the subject of several official releases.

Virgin Records released the whole of Spunk, without the talking between tracks, along with several other early Sex Pistols demos as part of a limited edition double-CD reissue of Never Mind the Bollocks in 1996 called Spunk/This Is Crap.

Spunk was released on 17 July 2006 by Sanctuary Records in its original vinyl format (CMQLP1395, limited to 1,000 copies). The CD version (CMRCD1376) included the three bonus tracks from the original No Future UK? bootleg.

A Venezuelan bootleg album, Smilin' Ears, features the same tracks, except additional track of intro to "No Future" at the beginning of album. It is unnamed, consisting of "Nookie" backing speech of band members. The words spoken by Johnny Rotten are "I don't have any heroes, they're all useless. I don't need a Rolls Royce, I don't need a house in the country, I don't need a villa in the south of France. I'm happy as I am an' I'm gonna carry on". The recording was taken from a 1976 edition of the London Weekend Show hosted by Janet Street-Porter, which documented the rise of punk rock.

Spunk was included as a bonus disc in the Sex Pistols box set 76-77, a four-CD set of all of the band's pre-Never Mind The Bollocks demo recordings as well as various alternate versions (rough mixes, alternate vocal takes, etc.) of Never Mind The Bollocks session tracks and later Dave Goodman remixes of some of the original demos. The box set was released by Universal Music Group in 2021.

== Track listing ==
All songs written by the Sex Pistols, all songs on the original bootleg album were simply credited to "Spunk". Several songs were presented with early or incorrect titles (later titles noted in parentheses).

=== Side one ===
1. "Seventeen" ("Seventeen") – 2:08^{a}
2. "Satellite" – 4:10^{a}
3. "Feelings" ("No Feelings") – 2:51^{a}
4. "Just Me" ("I Wanna Be Me") – 3:11^{a}
5. "Submission" – 4:17^{a}
6. "Nookie" ("Anarchy in the U.K.") – 4:07^{b}

=== Side two ===
7. "No Future" ("God Save the Queen") – 3:37^{c}
8. "Problems" – 4:19^{c}
9. "Lots of Fun" ("Pretty Vacant") – 3:09^{c}
10. "Liar" – 2:44^{c}
11. "Who Was It" ("EMI") – 3:15^{c}
12. "New York (Looking for a Kiss)" ("New York") – 3:08^{c}

=== Bonus tracks on the original No Future UK? bootleg and official Sanctuary Spunk CD ===
13. "Anarchy in the UK"^{a}
14. "Pretty Vacant"^{a}
15. "No Fun"^{b}

=== Bonus tracks on Spunk/This is Crap CD ===
13. "Problems"^{d}
14. "No Feelings"^{d}
15. "Pretty Vacant"^{d}
16. "Submission"^{e}
17. "No Feelings"^{e}
18. "EMI"^{e}
19. "Satellite"^{e}
20. "Seventeen"^{e}
21. "Anarchy in the UK"^{a}

=== Notes ===
- ^a Recorded at the band's Denmark Street rehearsal room (mixed & overdubbed at Riverside/Decibel Studios), London, 13–30 July 1976.
- ^b Recorded at Lansdowne/Wessex Studios, London, 10–12 October 1976.
- ^c Recorded at Gooseberry/Eden Studios, London, 17–28 January 1977.
- ^d Recorded at Chris Spedding sessions, Majestic Studios May 1976
- ^e Recorded at Chris Thomas Never Mind the Bollocks… sessions, Wessex, summer 1977

== Personnel ==
- Johnny Rotten – lead vocals
- Steve Jones – guitar, backing vocals
- Glen Matlock – bass, backing vocals
- Paul Cook – drums, backing vocals
- Dave Goodman – producer
