= Anarchy in the U.K. =

1976 single by Sex Pistols

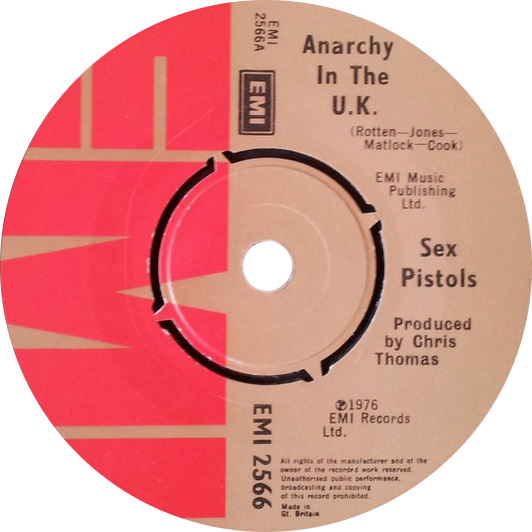
- Side A of the 1976 UK single

Single by Sex Pistols

from the album Never Mind the Bollocks, Here's the Sex Pistols
- B-side: "I Wanna Be Me"
- Released: 26 November 1976
- Recorded: 17 October 1976
- Studio: Wessex Sound, London
- Genre: Punk rock
- Length: 3:31
- Label: EMI
- Songwriters: Paul Cook; Steve Jones; John Lydon; Glen Matlock
- Producer: Chris Thomas

Sex Pistols singles chronology
"Anarchy in the U.K." (1976)	"God Save the Queen" (1977)

Music video
- "Anarchy in the U.K" on YouTube

"Anarchy in the U.K." is a song by the British punk rock band the Sex Pistols. It was released as the band's debut single on 26 November 1976 and was later featured on their album Never Mind the Bollocks, Here's the Sex Pistols. "Anarchy in the U.K." was number 56 on Rolling Stone magazine's list of the 500 Greatest Songs of All Time and is included in the Rock and Roll Hall of Fame's 500 Songs That Shaped Rock and Roll.

== Releases ==
Originally issued in a plain black sleeve, the single was the only Sex Pistols recording released by EMI, and it reached number 38 on the UK Singles Chart before EMI dropped the group on 6 January 1977, a month after members of the band used profanity during a live television broadcast. (The EMI version was recorded on 17 October 1976. An earlier demo version, titled "Nookie', was recorded between 10 and 12 October at Lansdowne/Wessex Studios, London. This version later surfaced on the Sex Pistols bootleg album Spunk).

In 2007, the surviving members (not including original Pistols bassist Glen Matlock) re-recorded "Anarchy in the U.K." for the video game Guitar Hero III: Legends of Rock because the multi-track master could not be found (it was rediscovered along with the rest of the Never Mind The Bollocks masters during a move in January 2012). The Guitar Hero version also appears in the film adaption of the A-Team. The song was also featured in the video game Tony Hawk's Pro Skater 4 as part of the soundtrack. The song also appears in the Constantine TV series during the episode "The Devil's Vinyl".

A limited edition 7" picture disc of the single was released on 21 April 2012 for that year's Record Store Day. In June 2022, a test pressing of the single that belonged to John Peel sold for more than £20,000 at auction.

== Lyrics ==
"Anarchy in the U.K."
With its "inflammatory, venomous lyrics [and] crude energy", the Sex Pistols' debut single "established punk's modus operandi". Producer Chris Thomas layered multiple tracks of Steve Jones's guitar to create a "searing wall of sound", while Johnny Rotten spewed the vocals "as if his teeth had been ground down to points."

In the documentary The Filth and the Fury, John Lydon described the composition of the song's opening lyrics, explaining that the best rhyme he could devise for the first line, "I am an Antichrist", was the second line, "I am an anarchist".

Despite the fact that he wrote and sang "Anarchy in the U.K." with the Sex Pistols, Lydon said in a 2012 interview,“I never was (an anarchist).Whoever told you that? Anarchy is mind games for the middle class...“I also had a song that said Pretty Vacant. I’m not pretty and I’m not vacant.” In a 2022 piece in The Times, Lydon elaborated,"Anarchy is a terrible idea. Let's get that clear. I'm not an anarchist. And I'm amazed that there are websites out there – .org anarchist sites – funded fully by the corporate hand and yet ranting on about being outside the shitstorm. It's preposterous. And they’re doing it in designer Dr Martens, clever little rucksacks and nicely manufactured balaclavas."

Sex Pistols manager Malcolm McLaren considered the song "a call to arms to the kids who believe that rock and roll was taken away from them. It's a statement of self rule, of ultimate independence."

=== Abbreviations ===
The abbreviations used in the lyrics are a selection of civil war references from 1970s headlines, a suggestion of what could happen in the United Kingdom. The IRA and the UDA were the largest paramilitary armies in the conflict in Northern Ireland: the heavily armed IRA (Irish Republican Army) were on the Republican (anti-British, pro-unification) side, and the thousands-strong UDA (Ulster Defence Association) were on the Loyalist (pro-British, anti-unification) side. The MPLA (Movimento Popular de Libertação de Angola, or the People's Movement for the Liberation of Angola) were the political party that took control of Angola, formerly one of Portugal's African colonies, in a 1975–1976 civil war, and still run the country today. When Rotten sings "I use the enemy", it's a deliberate homonym for "I use the NME", or New Musical Express, the British weekly music newspaper.

== Track listing ==
All tracks are written by Paul Cook, Steve Jones, Glen Matlock, and Johnny Rotten.

No.	Title	Length
1.	"Anarchy in the U.K."	3:31
2.	"I Wanna Be Me"	3:12
Total length:		6:43

== Personnel ==
Personnel taken from Sound on Sound.

- Johnny Rotten – vocals
- Steve Jones – guitar
- Glen Matlock – bass
- Paul Cook – drums

Technical

- Chris Thomas – producer
- Bill Price – engineer

== Charts ==
Chart (1976)	Peak position
UK Singles (Official Charts)	38

Chart (1992)	Peak position
Australia (ARIA Charts)	92
UK Singles (Official Charts)	33

== Certifications ==
Region	Certification	Certified units/sales
United Kingdom (BPI)	Silver	200,000^{‡}
^{‡} Sales+streaming figures based on certification alone.

== Cover versions ==
=== "L'Anarchie Pour Le UK" ===
An alternative recording of the song in 3/4 time, accompanied by violin and accordion, apparently both translated into French and sung by a mysterious figure called Louis Brennon (also named as Jerzimy in some sources), appeared on the Sex Pistols' 1979 album The Great Rock 'n' Roll Swindle.

=== Megadeth ===
"Anarchy in the U.K."
- German release cover

Single by Megadeth

from the album So Far, So Good... So What!
- B-side: "Liar"
- Released: February 17, 1988
- Recorded: 1987
- Genre: Thrash metal
- Length: 3:00
- Label: Capitol
- Songwriters: Paul Cook, Steve Jones, John Lydon, Glen Matlock

Megadeth singles chronology
"Peace Sells" (1986)	"Anarchy in the U.K." (1988)	"Mary Jane" (1988)

"Anarchy in the U.K." was covered by American thrash metal band Megadeth for their third album So Far, So Good... So What!, released in 1988.

Megadeth's version has altered lyrics. Dave Mustaine explained that he could not understand Johnny Rotten's singing, so he made up the parts he could not understand (in a notable example, the line "another council tenancy" is changed to "and other cunt-like tendencies"). In addition, the country is changed to "USA", though the title is kept unchanged. The song's music video is a montage of live footage of the band, cartoon political figures, various scenes of violence, and of a man being forced to watch (much like Alex's therapy in A Clockwork Orange). Steve Jones played the second solo.

Mustaine now refuses to play the song live due to lyrics referring to the Anti-Christ, and he believes he's "better for it".

==== Track listing versions ====
United States 7"

1. "Anarchy in the U.K."
2. "Liar"

United Kingdom 12"

1. "Anarchy in the U.K."
2. "Liar"
3. "502"

Germany 12"

1. "Anarchy in the U.K."
2. "Good Mourning/Black Friday" (live)
3. "Devil's Island" (live)

==== Charts ====
Chart (1988)	Peak position
New Zealand (Recorded Music NZ)	13
UK Singles (Official Charts)	45

=== Green Jellÿ ===
"Anarchy in the U.K."

Single by Green Jellÿ

from the album Cereal Killer Soundtrack
- B-side: "Green Jellÿ Theme Song"
- Released: August 2, 1993
- Length: 3:29
- Label: Zoo Entertainment
- Songwriters: Paul Cook, Steve Jones, John Lydon, Glen Matlock
- Producers: Sylvia Massy, C. J. Buscaglia

Green Jellÿ singles chronology
"Three Little Pigs" (1992)	"Anarchy in the U.K." (1993)	"Electric Harley House (of Love)" (1993)

Green Jellÿ's version of "Anarchy in the U.K." is a parody cover of the original with added Flintstones references. The song originally appeared as "Anarchy in Bedrock" on Green Jellÿ's (then Green Jellö's) Triple Live Möther Gööse at Budokan album. William Hanna and Joseph Barbera initially took offense to this version, and to Green Jellÿ mocking The Flintstones, but they later relented, as this version was featured on the soundtrack to the Flintstones film that was released in 1994.

==== Critical reception ====
Pete Stanton from Smash Hits gave the Green Jellÿ version five out of five, writing, "They've followed the insanity of Three Little Pigs with more madness, littering a great song with "Yabadabadoo"s and an eardrum bursting "Wiiillmmaaaa" at the end. Get into Green Jelly quick before a doctor slips them into strait-jackets, shoves them into a room and locks the door."

==== Track listing ====
1. "Anarchy in the U.K." – 3:29
2. "Green Jellÿ Theme Song" – 2:15
3. "Three Little Pigs (Blowin Down the House Mix)" – 6:34

==== Personnel ====
- Danny Carey – drums
- Bill Tutton, Rootin' Bloomquist – bass
- Marc Levinthal, Steven Shenar, Bernie Peaks – guitar
- Bill Manspeaker, Joe Cannizzaro, Gary Helsinger, Greg Raynard, and Maynard James Keenan – vocals
- Kim O'Donnell and Caroline Jester – backup vocals, floor tom drums

=== Mötley Crüe ===
American heavy metal band Mötley Crüe covered the song on their 1991 compilation album Decade of Decadence, substituting US analogies and organizations in the lyrics for UK ones. It was also their last song with lead singer Vince Neil until 1997's Generation Swine.
