= Personality Crisis (song) =

Single by New York Dolls

from the album New York Dolls
- A-side: "Trash"
- Released: August 1973
- Recorded: The Record Plant, New York City
- Genre: Glam punk; glam rock; blues rock; rock and roll; proto-punk
- Length: 3:41
- Label: Mercury Records
- Songwriters: David Johansen; Johnny Thunders
- Producer: Todd Rundgren

New York Dolls singles chronology
"Trash" / "Personality Crisis" (1973)	"Jet Boy" / "Vietnamese Baby" (1973)

Music video
- "Personality Crisis" on YouTube

"Personality Crisis" is the lead track from the New York Dolls' self-titled debut album. It was written by Dolls lead singer David Johansen and guitarist Johnny Thunders. An early demo version of it appears on the 1981 collection Lipstick Killers – The Mercer Street Sessions 1972.

== Release ==
Mercury Records originally released "Personality Crisis" in 1973 as a double A-side single with "Trash" to coincide with the album's release. Promo singles of "Personality Crisis" were also distributed to radio stations. Following the band's break-up, it was rereleased by Bellaphon Records as a double A-side with "Looking for a Kiss" in 1978. In 1982, a 12" single of "Personality Crisis" & "Looking For A Kiss" b/w "Subway Train" & "Bad Girl" was released by Kamera Records. The same track listing appeared on the See For Miles Records CD single released in 1990.

== Reception ==
Jack Douglas, who engineered New York Dolls, named "Personality Crisis" as his favorite song on the album. Music journalist Tony Fletcher called it an "instant glitter rock anthem", while writer and historian David Szatmary called it an anthemic and dynamic protopunk song. In Rolling Stone magazine, Tony Glover wrote that "Personality Crisis" serves as "a jumping companion piece to classics" such as The Doors' "Twentieth Century Fox" and "Cool, Calm & Collected" by the Rolling Stones. It is number 267 on Rolling Stone's 2004 list of the 500 Greatest Songs of All Time (#271 on the 2010 list).

== Personnel ==
Sources:

- David Johansen – lead vocals
- Johnny Thunders – lead guitar, backing vocals
- Sylvain Sylvain – rhythm guitar, piano, backing vocals
- Arthur "Killer" Kane – bass
- Jerry Nolan – drums

== Covers ==
- "Personality Crisis" is the closing track on David Johansen's 1982 live album, Live It Up. It is the only New York Dolls original on the album.
- Sonic Youth recorded "Personality Crisis" with Kim Gordon on lead vocals in July 1990. It was first released as a write-in offer promo 7" single in the November 1990 issue of Sassy Magazine, then included on the 1993 Whores Moaning e.p. and later added to the Deluxe Edition bonus disc of Dirty.
- Teenage Fanclub featuring Donna Matthews of Elastica cover the song for the soundtrack to the 1998 Todd Haynes ode to glam rock, Velvet Goldmine.
- Scott Weiland included it on his 2011 album A Compilation of Scott Weiland Cover Songs
- Todd Rundgren included "Personality Crisis" in a 2011 collection of covers of songs that he'd produced, entitled (re)Production
- Rockhead covers it on the various artist collection, Sin City: Dirty Rock Anthems inspired by the Sin City comic books.
