= Trash (New York Dolls song) =

Single by New York Dolls

from the album New York Dolls
- A-side: "Personality Crisis"
- Released: July 1973
- Studio: The Record Plant (New York)
- Genre: Glam rock; pop rock; proto-punk
- Length: 3:09
- Label: Mercury
- Songwriter(s): David Johansen; Sylvain Sylvain
- Producer(s): Todd Rundgren

New York Dolls singles chronology
"Trash" / "Personality Crisis" (1973)	"Jet Boy" / "Vietnamese Baby" (1973)

"Trash" is the debut single by the American rock band New York Dolls. It was recorded for their 1973 self-titled album and released as a double A-side with the song "Personality Crisis" in July 1973. "Trash" did not chart upon its release, but has since been hailed by music critics as an anthemic glam rock and proto-punk song. In 2009, the band recorded a reggae-styled remake of the song for their album Cause I Sez So.

== Music and lyrics ==
"Trash" begins immediately with its chorus, in which lead vocalist David Johansen sings dramatically and implores the song's subject—"my sweet baby"—to not throw her "life away." Journalist and author Phil Strongman interpreted the singer's appeal to his subject as being in the context of a socially deviant New York City: "in under four minutes, it tells a bittersweet'n'sour low-life love story – how does the girl call her lover-boy? 'Trash!' – in majestic trash-Glam style. These people might be hookers, rent boys, junkies, sneak thieves – or so the lyrics imply – but they're still human beings and their subject matter is still tragedy." Johansen quotes the lyric "how do you call your lover boy" from Mickey & Sylvia's 1956 song "Love Is Strange".

According to music critic Robert Christgau, Johansen used ambiguity as a lyrical mode on the song, particularly when the lyric "please don't you ask me if I love you" is followed by "if you don't know what I do", and later by "'Cause I don't know why I do". He replaces the phrase "life" in "Don't take my life away" with "knife", "night", and "lights" when singing the lyric at different times throughout the song. Both Strongman and rock photographer Bob Gruen felt that the other chorus about needing to "pick up" trash gave the song an ecological theme: "Trash, pick it up, don't throw my life away."

"Trash" concludes with a double-beat ending that producer Todd Rundgren embellished with high-pitched background vocals, which were inspired by the Herd's 1968 song "From the Underworld". According to Strongman, "The song's soaring finale suggests that all these problems – chemical, emotional, environmental – might just be overcome by the sheer power of love'n'lust – young rock'n'roll romance, by the passion of young people."

== Release and reception ==
"Trash" was released by Mercury Records as a double A-side with the song "Personality Crisis" in July 1973. The single did not chart. In her review for The New Yorker at the time, music critic Ellen Willis wrote that the song is a "transcendent" highlight on an album full of "instant classics". She interpreted the single's second A-side, "Personality Crisis", as "a statement about the band — about clashing cultures and the dilemma of preserving one's uniqueness while reaching out to others." In a retrospective review, Jon Matsumoto of the Los Angeles Times praised Johansen's "bratty vocalizing" on "Trash", which he called a "punky pop-rock anthem." Treble named it one of 10 Essential Proto-punk tracks. Music writer and broadcaster Jon Savage named it the 13th best glam rock song of all time in a 2013 list for The Guardian, in which he wrote:

Simultaneously ludicrous and tough, sloppy and hard, vicious and tender – just listen to those soaring, girl-group harmonies – 'Trash' was, along with 'Jet Boy', the Dolls' big pop move.

According to Strongman, "Trash" may have been the most "passionate" of all the New York Dolls' songs. Music journalist Tony Fletcher later said that, as with "Personality Crisis" and "Jet Boy", the addition of background vocals and piano helped make "Trash" into an anthemic glitter rock song, while Kirk Lake cited it as a proto-punk classic in The Rough Guide to Rock (2003).

== Personnel ==
Credits are adapted from the liner notes for New York Dolls.

- David Johansen – vocals
- Arthur Kane – bass guitar
- Jerry Nolan – drums
- Todd Rundgren – additional piano, producer
- Sylvain Sylvain – piano, rhythm guitar, vocals
- Johnny Thunders – lead guitar, vocals

== Bibliography ==
- Anon. (1973). New York Dolls (liner notes). New York Dolls. Mercury Records. SRM-1-675.
- Christgau, Robert (1998). Grown Up All Wrong: 75 Great Rock and Pop Artists from Vaudeville to Techno. Harvard University Press. ISBN 0-674-44318-7.
- Fletcher, Tony (2009). All Hopped Up and Ready to Go: Music from the Streets of New York 1927–77. W. W. Norton & Company. ISBN 978-0393334838.
- Fricke, David (2000). "Review: New York Dolls". Rolling Stone. No. April 27. New York.
- Lake, Kirk (2003). "The New York Dolls". In Buckley, Peter (ed.). The Rough Guide to Rock. Rough Guides. ISBN 1858284570.
- Matsumoto, Jon (1994). "The New York Dolls". Los Angeles Times. No. September 29. Archived from the original on March 4, 2014.
- Terich, Jeff (November 5, 2015). "10 Essential Proto-punk tracks". Treblezine.
- Savage, Jon (2013). "The 20 best glam-rock songs of all time". The Guardian. No. January 31. London. section G2. Archived from the original on September 21, 2014.
- Strong, Martin Charles (2002). The Great Rock Discography. The National Academies. ISBN 1-84195-312-1.
- Strongman, Phil (2008). Pretty Vacant: A History of UK Punk. Chicago Review Press. ISBN 978-1556527524.
- Willis, Ellen (1973). "Frankenstein at the Waldorf". The New Yorker. No. November 19.
- Willis, Ellen (1974). "Rock, Etc". The New Yorker. Vol. 50, no. April 1.
