= Sid Vicious =

English bassist (1957–1979)

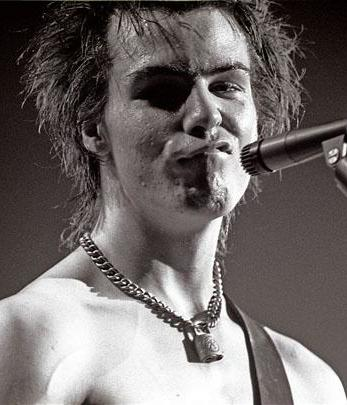
- Vicious at the Winterland Ballroom in San Francisco on 14 January 1978, the final Sex Pistols concert with him

Background information
- Also known as: John Simon Ritchie; John Beverley
- Born: Simon John Ritchie; 10 May 1957; Lewisham, London, England
- Died: 2 February 1979 (aged 21) New York City, US
- Genre: Punk rock
- Occupation: Musician
- Instruments: Bass guitar; vocals
- Years active: 1976–1978
- Labels: Virgin; EMI; A&M
- Formerly of: The Flowers of Romance; Siouxsie and the Banshees; Sex Pistols; Vicious White Kids
- Partner: Nancy Spungen (1977–1978)
- Website: sexpistolsofficial.com/bio/sid-vicious/

John Simon Ritchie (Note: Various accounts list Vicious's real name as John Beverley, Simon Ritchie, John Simon Beverley, or John Simon Ritchie. According to his friend and bandmate John Lydon, Simon was Ritchie's first name, but he disliked it, preferring instead to use the name John.) (born Simon John Ritchie; 10 May 1957 – 2 February 1979), known professionally as Sid Vicious, was an English musician, best known as the second bassist for the punk rock band Sex Pistols. After his death in 1979 at the age of 21, he remained an icon of the punk subculture; one of his friends noted that he embodied "everything in punk that was dark, decadent and nihilistic".

== Early life ==
Simon John Ritchie was born in Lewisham, southeast London, to John and Anne Ritchie (née McDonald; later named Anne Beverley; 1932–1996). Anne McDonald briefly served in the Women's Royal Air Force and later worked in the London jazz and club scene, where she met Ritchie's father, a guardsman at Buckingham Palace and a semi-professional trombone player on the London jazz circuit. In 1958 Anne moved with baby Simon to Ibiza, where she expected to be joined by John. John claimed he would provide them with financial support until his arrival, but neither John nor any money from him ever arrived. Anne reportedly began selling marijuana to get by.

With the help of the British consulate in Spain, Anne returned in 1961 to the United Kingdom and, in 1965, married Christopher Beverley, who died six months later of kidney failure. Anne and Ritchie settled in Tunbridge Wells, Kent, where they lived from 1965 to 1971, and where Ritchie attended Sandown Court School (later renamed The Skinners' Kent Academy). In 1971, the pair moved to Stoke Newington in Hackney, East London, where Ritchie attended Clissold Park School (later renamed Stoke Newington School). At this time, Ritchie began using the name 'John Beverley'.

In 1973, John Beverley, as he was then known, met John Lydon at Hackney College where he had enrolled for a photography course. Subsequently the friends attended Kingsway College. Lydon introduced Beverley to his friends John Gray and John Wardle. The group became known amongst their peers as 'The Four Johns'. Lydon and Ritchie, who both left home at 16, began squatting in a derelict residential building in Hampstead (New Court, Flask Walk) with a group of ageing hippies and stopped bothering to go to college, which was far away from where they were living. Three of the four Johns took nicknames: Lydon nicknamed Ritchie "Sid Vicious" after Ritchie was bitten by Lydon's hamster Sid (named after Syd Barrett); Lydon was dubbed "Johnny Rotten" by his bandmate, guitarist Steve Jones; and Vicious nicknamed Wardle "Jah Wobble".

When Ritchie turned 16, Anne kicked him out of her home. In a 1988 interview, Anne said: "I remember saying to him: 'It's either you or me, and it's not going to be me. I have got to try to preserve myself and you just fuck off.' He said: 'I've not got anywhere to go,' and I said: 'I don't care.' By the mid-'70s, Anne's life was consumed by her addiction to heroin, to the point where, as friend John Wardle claimed in a 2009 interview, she was unaware that her son was attending Kingsway College of Further Education (later known as Westminster Kingsway College). While at Kingsway, Ritchie told a counsellor that he was contemplating suicide.

The four young men started hanging around the King's Road in Chelsea, London which was a centre for music and fashion. A favourite spot was Malcolm McLaren and Vivienne Westwood's clothing store, Sex. There, Vicious met American expatriate Chrissie Hynde, before she formed her group the Pretenders. According to her 2015 autobiography Reckless: My Life as a Pretender, Hynde convinced Vicious — by paying him £2 — to join her in a sham marriage to enable her to get a work permit and remain in the country, after John Lydon had already declined. The plan was thwarted by the register office being closed the day the 'happy couple' turned up. According to Lydon, he and Vicious took up busking, with Lydon singing and occasionally playing the violin and Vicious playing a tambourine or an acoustic guitar.

In 1975, Lydon, Steve Jones, Glen Matlock and Paul Cook, with McLaren as their manager, formed the Sex Pistols, the band Vicious would eventually join. Vicious was photographed watching the band attack their audience at the Nashville Rooms in West Kensington in 1976. Vicious then began his own musical career.

== The Flowers of Romance and Siouxsie and the Banshees (1976) ==
In 1976, Vicious co-founded, as vocalist and saxophone player, the Flowers of Romance along with the Clash co-founder guitarist Keith Levene, Viv Albertine and Palmolive (who would both go on to become the guitarist and the first drummer of the Slits respectively), and Kenny Morris (future drummer of Siouxsie and the Banshees) who would replace Palmolive who got kicked out of the band by Vicious after rejecting his advances. In the music documentary, "Punk Attitude", Chrissie Hynde remarked that at this time, he learned to play bass by staying up for 3 nights on speed playing along to the Ramones' first album Ramones, fixating on the up-tempo bump-and-grind pattern of the song "I Don't Wanna Go Down to the Basement", a pattern he would apply to most of his playing from then on.

In June 1976, Vicious went to a Sex Pistols concert at the 100 Club. Nick Kent, who had played guitar with the Sex Pistols early on and had left music to become an NME music critic and champion of punk rock (and who was Hynde's boyfriend), was also there, and was apparently blocking Vicious's view. Vicious, high on speed, lashed Kent's head with a rusted motorcycle chain which, according to Hynde, he carried with him. The incident was reported in the papers but no charges were laid.

Although the songs they wrote would later be performed by other bands, the Flowers of Romance did not perform live, or record any music. But Vicious came to the attention of members of the Damned. He was considered, along with Dave Vanian, for the position of lead singer, but Vicious failed to show up for the audition.

On 20 September 1976, Vicious appeared with Siouxsie and the Banshees, playing drums only at their first set at the 100 Club Punk Special in London's Oxford Street, a two-day festival co-founded by McLaren. The following day, Vicious went to the Damned's performance. Drunk and high on amphetamines, he hurled his glass at the stage, attempting to strike Vanian. He missed, and the glass shattered against a pillar and blinded a woman in one eye. Vicious was arrested and imprisoned at Ashford Remand Centre. Westwood and Albertine visited Vicious in prison, with Albertine bringing the book Helter Skelter as a gift.

== Sex Pistols (1977–1978) ==
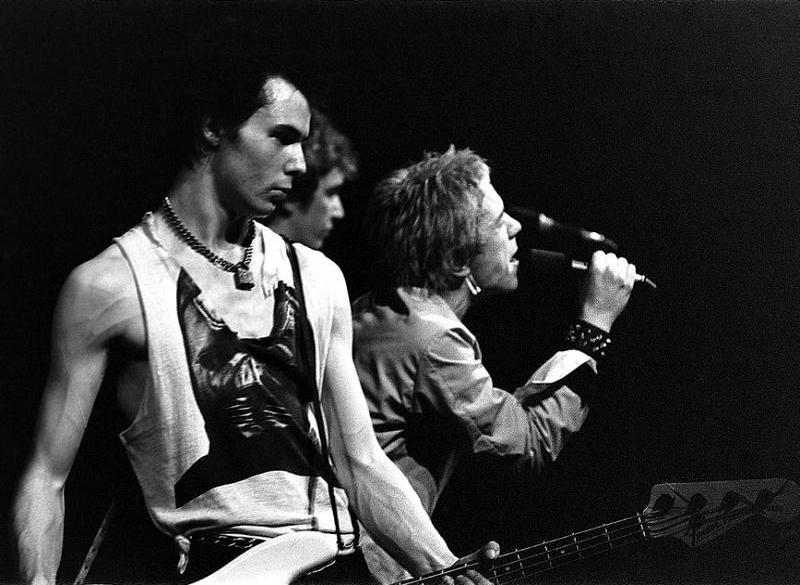
The Sex Pistols (Vicious left, Steve Jones centre, and Johnny Rotten right) performing in Trondheim in 1977

In February 1977, Sex Pistols' manager McLaren announced that Glen Matlock had been "thrown out of the band" because "he liked the Beatles", and that he had been replaced by Vicious. In his autobiography I Was a Teenage Sex Pistol, Matlock says he quit because he was "sick of all the bullshit". In the 2000 documentary The Filth and the Fury, the band members agreed that there was tension between Matlock and Rotten, but Matlock says that those tensions were aggravated by McLaren, who wanted to generate chaos in the band as a creative mechanism, and as a way of building the band's image. He wanted Matlock to leave, and to replace him with Vicious, saying "if Johnny Rotten is the voice of punk, then Vicious is the attitude". By then, Vicious had become the Sex Pistols' uber-fan, never missing a concert. He was encouraged to be drunk and disorderly, with Wobble saying, "Sid was offered up as a sacrificial lamb by the people around the Pistols. None of them would have gone over the top. He was their kamikaze pilot, and they were all too happy to strap him in and send him off."

In March 1977, the Sex Pistols were signed to A&M Records. In celebration, they trashed the company's offices, and then held a private party at the Speakeasy, a club and restaurant frequented by established members of the London music scene. The Sex Pistols members confronted the BBC DJ Bob Harris, who was the presenter of the Old Grey Whistle Test, a television show that featured non-chart music. Blocking Harris behind the bar, broken bottles in hand, they demanded to know when they would be on the show. A bar fight ensued. Vicious jammed a broken bottle into the face of BBC recording engineer George Nicholson. Harris was rescued by the Procol Harum road crew, who grouped around him and escorted him out of the club, where they found that police had cordoned off the entire block. None of the Sex Pistols were arrested but, the next day, A&M dropped them and Capital Radio banned all Sex Pistols music from its stations.

Vicious played his first show with the Sex Pistols on 3 April 1977, at The Screen on the Green; his debut was filmed by Don Letts and appears in Punk Rock Movie. But he could not play well and had no bass experience, so guitarist Steve Jones played bass on the band's debut album, Never Mind the Bollocks, Here's the Sex Pistols. Vicious was allowed to play bass on one track, "Bodies", but his contribution was later overdubbed by Jones. He also missed most of the band's rehearsals and recording sessions because he was in hospital with hepatitis, likely caused by intravenous drug use. By this time, Vicious was using heroin, with many believing that his mother was his supplier. Dee Dee Ramone had seen him shooting drugs on more than one occasion, and Rotten's friend John Gray had found Vicious shooting speed while he was still living with his mother; Vicious told him that the drugs were "me mum's".

Also in 1977, Vicious met Nancy Spungen, an American groupie living in London, who had a life-long history of unstable mental behaviour and was also a heroin addict. Spungen, who had initially set her sights on Rotten and who supported herself by alternately dealing drugs and working as a topless dancer, made herself useful on the King's Road scene by procuring drugs for musicians. She and Vicious became inseparable, which caused problems with the band, whose members did not like her; McLaren admitted to planning to have her abducted and forced onto a plane back to the United States. Vicious and Spungen had a volatile relationship; Vicious played nursemaid when she was sick and was shy and polite with her mother, who reported watching Spungen cut his meat for him. On the other hand, Spungen was known to be verbally abusive and physically aggressive. Vicious may have facilitated Spungen's occasional prostitution (and watched). According to Rotten's wife Nora Forster, Vicious often hit Spungen and, in her last conversation with her mother, Spungen admitted that beatings that she had previously said were at the hands of strangers actually came from Vicious. They shared an infatuation with knives.

Beginning in July, with Spungen in tow, the band went on a Scandinavian tour, then toured the Netherlands and the UK. On 28 October 1977, their only album, Never Mind the Bollocks, Here's the Sex Pistols, was released and, due in part to notoriety (particularly of the song "God Save the Queen"), and in spite of sales bans at major retailers, the album debuted at number one on the UK Album Charts and went gold on 17 November. It remained a best-seller for nearly a year, spending 48 weeks in the top 75. It is frequently listed as the most influential punk album of all time.

In 1977, the Sex Pistols were recording in Wessex Sound Studios at the same time as Queen. Vicious entered the control room Queen was working in and mockingly called out to them: "Oi, Freddie! Have you succeeded in bringing ballet to the masses yet?" (This was a reference to an earlier NME interview in which Mercury gave parallels between ballet and rock music). Freddie Mercury responded: "Ah, Simon Ferocious!" and "We're trying dear, we're trying." Mercury then grabbed Vicious by the lapels and threw him out of the room.

On 24 December 1977, the Sex Pistols played The Royal Links Pavilion, Cromer; the next day, the band played two shows at Ivanhoe's in Huddersfield, West Yorkshire. It was during the national Fire Brigades Strike and the band performed a matinee for the children of firefighters. In the 2013 documentary Never Mind the Baubles: Xmas '77 with the Sex Pistols, Lydon claimed that Vicious had to be warned not to be the "hardcore, tough rocker bloke" in front of the children. The track of Vicious singing the Johnny Thunders song "Born to Lose", which appears on Sid Sings, was recorded during this performance, as Vicious stepped in when Lydon left the stage to pose as Father Christmas. These were the Sex Pistols' last performances in Britain, until the original members reunited for the Filthy Lucre Tour in 1996.

In January 1978, the Sex Pistols embarked on a two-week USA tour. There was rising tension within the band. Rotten was barely speaking to anyone. Warner Bros., which organized and staffed the tour, insisted that Vicious clean up his heroin habit, so he was using methadone. He was in a constant state of semi-withdrawal and furious that the band had blocked Spungen from accompanying them on the tour. McLaren had long been keeping Vicious on rations of $14.00 (US) a week but he still managed to find drugs. To make matters worse, McLaren, ever eager for more chaos and careful that journalists were on-scene, booked the band, not into the clubs of New York, but into bars in Louisiana, Georgia, Tennessee, and Texas. In San Antonio on 8 January, Vicious felt antagonised by an audience member and struck him on the head with his bass. Before the Sex Pistols took the stage of the Longhorn Ballroom in Dallas on 10 January, Vicious carved the words "gimme a fix" into his chest with a razor (later joking that "if you try to kill yourself [with a razor to the chest], it won't work"). He greeted the audience by calling them "redneck cowboy faggots"; in return, he was struck by a full can of beer to the head. The next night, 11 January, he punched a hole in the Green Room wall after the band's show at Cain's Ballroom in Tulsa. At the end of their 14 January show at the Winterland Ballroom in San Francisco, Johnny Rotten uttered the famous quote "Ever get the feeling you've been cheated?", marking the end of the Sex Pistols.

== Post-Sex Pistols ==
On 19 January, Vicious boarded a flight from San Francisco to New York. By the time the plane landed at JFK Airport, he had slipped into a diazepam-, methadone- and alcohol-induced coma and was rushed to a hospital in Queens where, as he told the photographer Roberta Bayley, the doctor told him that if he did not quit drinking, he would be dead in six months.

When he was released, he re-united with Spungen. In April, the two travelled to Paris to film the Sex Pistols mockumentary The Great Rock 'n' Roll Swindle, where they spent most of their time in their hotel room, doing drugs. Director Julien Temple was able to get Vicious to attend production long enough to record three song covers: "C'mon Everybody", "Something Else" and "My Way". When Vicious returned to his hotel, he found that Spungen had retaliated for being left alone by superficially cutting her wrists.

The couple then travelled to New London where, by August, they needed to return to the US but had no money. Sid bumped into Glen Matlock, who by this point had founded the band Rich Kids, and suggested that they play a gig together. For this concert, Vicious and Matlock recruited Rich Kids guitarist and singer Steve New, and the Damned's drummer Rat Scabies. They called themselves Vicious White Kids and performed once—at the Electric Ballroom in Camden Town on 15 August 1978. Vicious did not play bass in this band; he was the lead singer. Spungen joined on backing vocals but Matlock made sure that her microphone was not plugged in for the concert.

Vicious and Spungen then returned to New York, where they settled into Room 100 of the Hotel Chelsea (after causing a fire in their first room) as Mr. and Mrs. John Ritchie. Spungen acted as his manager, putting together the band of Steve Dior, Jerry Nolan and Arthur Kane and booking him into the New York club Max's Kansas City. Spungen sang with him, and they were sometimes joined by Mick Jones and Johnny Thunders. He drew large crowds, though some performances were "hellish", with the audience booing his attempted imitation of Rotten, and Vicious insulting the audience. Examples of this can be heard in the in-between tracks on his live album Sid Sings; these performances were also released in 2002 (and again in 2011), as Live at Max's Kansas City, NY 1978. In the documentary Who Killed Nancy?, Dior said that Vicious "got good money for those shows" but Spungen often had to call her parents for money. In one of these conversations, Spungen said that she was having problems with her kidneys, and asked her mother to look into getting her, and Vicious, into a detox programme.

== Death of Nancy Spungen ==
Vicious's mugshot from 9 December 1978

On the night of 11 October 1978, Vicious and Spungen hosted a party in their hotel room, during which Vicious took approximately 30 Tuinal tablets, and was comatose for the rest of the night while numerous people came and went. At about 11 a.m. the next day, hotel staff found Spungen dead on the bathroom floor, with a knife wound to her abdomen. Vicious was found wandering the hallway. He first claimed to have killed her, then said he remembered nothing. Two people who had been at the party stated that Spungen was alive at 5 a.m. The murder weapon was identified as a Jaguar K-11 hunting knife, which Spungen had purchased for Vicious a few days earlier. Vicious was arrested and charged with second-degree murder. He told police that he and Spungen had argued that night but gave conflicting versions of what happened next, saying, "I stabbed her, but I never meant to kill her" then saying that he did not remember anything, then that Spungen had fallen onto the knife. The arresting officer, Sgt. Thomas Kilroy of the Third Homicide Unit, said: "... Vicious admitted killing Miss Spungen during a dispute."

Lawyer Michael Berger first dealt with the matter, but McLaren and Anne Beverley were lawyer-shopping. They interviewed several high-profile lawyers, including Melvin Belli, Gerald B. Lefcourt and William Kunstler before settling on F. Lee Bailey. Bailey never appeared in court, but another lawyer from his firm, Jim Merberg, arranged for Vicious to be released on $50,000 bail, with the conditions that he not leave New York and that he sign in daily at the Third Homicide Unit offices, and at the Lafayette Street Methadone Center. All legal costs were paid by the Sex Pistols' label, Virgin Records. Vicious returned to the Chelsea Hotel, where he was joined by McLaren and his mother.

McLaren firmly believed that Vicious was innocent. Noting that the knife was left in plain view and that the couple kept their cash in a drawer, he believed that Spungen caught one of the party guests stealing money and was stabbed by that person. Given the number of people who had been through the hotel room on the night of the murder, Bailey had his investigator look into the possibility that a third party was involved in Spungen's death.

Bailey also hired forensic psychiatrist Dr. Stephen Teich to evaluate Vicious. After their initial conversation, during which Vicious was preoccupied by the 'working class in Berlin' and remained fixated on the television, Teich told Anne Beverley that Vicious must not be left alone. Hours later, Beverley called Teich and said that Vicious had slashed his arms with a smashed light bulb. Teich returned to the hotel and called an ambulance. EMS staff arrived with the police; when Vicious saw them, he headed for the window but was blocked by Teich. He was taken to Bellevue Hospital and then moved to the New York-Presbyterian Westchester Behavioral Health Center in White Plains, New York. He was released on 26 November and returned to the Chelsea. At this time, Rotten tried to contact Vicious, but his calls were barred by Beverley and McLaren. On 28 November, Vicious was interviewed by the Irish journalist Bernard Clarke. He said that Spungen's death was "meant to happen" and that "Nancy always said she'd die before she was 21". He said that he just wanted to have fun. When asked where he would like to be, he replied, "Under the ground".

In the meantime, McLaren announced that the Sex Pistols would reunite to record a Christmas album to benefit Vicious's defence, and sold T-shirts with the slogan, "She's Dead, I'm Alive, I'm Yours."

=== Theories about the killer ===
In his 2007 book Pretty Vacant: A History of Punk, director Phil Strongman stated that he was convinced that it was actor Rockets Redglare who killed Nancy Spungen, noting that Redglare not only knew about the large amounts of cash kept in the bedside table, but also brought the Tuinal to the party. Redglare, who died in 2001, had publicly denied this but privately confessed it to friends. However, Howie Pyro insisted that it was Redglare's habit to tell stories to gain attention. Strongman also implicated Redglare's friend, punk rocker Neon Leon. (Note: Some sources quote Leon's family name as Matthews. Getty Images quotes his family name as Webster.) Leon lived down the hall from Vicious and Spungen and was found to be in possession of many of Vicious's belongings, including his leather jacket. Leon claimed that Vicious had given the items to him for safe-keeping. He later surrendered them to police. Lester Bangs wrote in The Village Voice that when he telephoned Leon's room after Spungen's death an unidentified man picked up and told him he knew who the murderer was, but refused to name the person.

== Assault on Todd Smith ==
By December, Vicious had started dating rocker Judy Nylon as well as fellow drug addicts Connie Gripp (ex-girlfriend of Dee Dee Ramone) and Michelle Robinson, an aspiring actress. On 5 December 1978, Vicious went to the Hurrah nightclub with his friend Danielle Boothe, photographers David Still and Peter Kodick Gravelle, and the comedian and drug-dealer Rockets Redglare who had appointed himself Vicious's bodyguard. Playing that night was Skafish; their drum roadie, Tarrah, was the girlfriend of Todd Smith (Patti Smith's brother). Vicious began flirting with Tarrah. She rebuffed him and he pinched her. Smith told him to back off and Vicious smashed a beer bottle and jammed it into Smith's face. Smith required seven stitches. Redglare told police that Smith provoked Vicious, that the bottle broke in Vicious's hand and, producing the glass shards, said that Smith's wound was the accidental result of flying glass. On 7 December, Vicious was arrested and charged with assault. The judge agreed that Vicious had broken the terms of his previous bail and sent him to Rikers Island, where he underwent opiate detoxification. While he was in Rikers, Anne Beverley brought Robinson to visit her son.

On 18 January, Vicious appeared in court, represented by Jim Merberg. To everyone's surprise, the judge, James Leff, not only released Vicious on $50,000 bail, but reduced his previous bail conditions—he now had to report to the Homicide Unit only three days a week and did not have to appear at the methadone centre at all. Leff applied one condition: that Vicious not frequent night clubs.

While it was widely reported, including by Rotten, that Mick Jagger paid Vicious' bail, that was untrue; Virgin Records continued to pay his legal fees. Anne Beverley, who was in court with Robinson, was happy with the outcome, telling reporters "Now the public will know he is a good boy."

== Death and aftermath ==
Vicious's death certificate

On the morning of 1 February 1979, after completing his detoxification programme, Vicious was released from Rikers Island. He arrived in Manhattan, and by chance, met his friend Peter Gravelle. Vicious asked Gravelle to find him some heroin. Gravelle brought $200 worth of the drug to the apartment of Michelle Robinson at 63 Bank Street, where he joined Vicious, Robinson, Beverley, Jerry Only of the band Misfits, Eileen Polk, Jerry Nolan of the Heartbreakers, Esther Herskovits, and Howie Pyro. Gravelle said that they sat around doing drugs, and he left at 3:00 a.m.

Only said that he and Anne Beverley made dinner, and that he, Polk, and Pyro left early, when the heroin use began. He noted that Vicious was already nodding off, and around 11:00 p.m., he "picked him up and slapped him around" before Beverley put a blanket over him and told Only "that he'd be okay. I was like, he's just been in prison for two months so he had to be clean so you know you can't be messing with him." However, Gravelle said that Robinson gave Vicious four Tuinal (a barbiturate and a favourite of Sid's) to help him sleep. Vicious died over the night of a drug overdose. Robinson and Beverley discovered his body the following morning, on 2 February 1979.

Anne Beverley later claimed that Vicious and Spungen had made a suicide pact and that Vicious's death was not accidental. She produced a handwritten note, which she said she found in the pocket of Vicious's leather jacket, reading "We had a death pact, and I have to keep my half of the bargain. Please bury me next to my baby. Bury me in my leather jacket, jeans and motorcycle boots. Goodbye." According to Deborah Spungen, Vicious wrote a letter to her when he was last hospitalized, saying approximately the same thing. "We always knew that we would go to the same place when we died", he wrote. "We so much wanted to die together in each other's arms. I cry every time I think about that. I promised my baby that I would kill myself if anything ever happened to her, and she promised me the same. This is my final commitment to my love." Spungen was Jewish, and is buried in a Jewish cemetery in Pennsylvania. As an inter-faith burial was not possible, Vicious's body was cremated at Garden State Crematory in New Jersey. According to Polk, Beverley asked Deborah Spungen if she could scatter Vicious's ashes over Nancy's grave and Spungen said no. Regardless, Polk said that Jerry Only drove Beverley, her sister, and two of Vicious's friends, to Nancy's gravesite, where Beverley scattered Vicious's ashes.

By the time of Vicious's death, he and Spungen were internationally notorious. His death made the front pages of most New York newspapers for days, and Robinson's apartment building was thronged by reporters. Robinson would soon change her name. The first of many posthumous albums appeared in 1980; the live bootleg recording Sid Vicious has as its jacket image the photo of Vicious's body being removed from 63 Bank St.

Jones, his former Sex Pistols bandmate, wrote in his autobiography that Vicious' estate passed to maternal cousins.

== Legacy ==
In the years after his death, Vicious retained his status as a cultural symbol of the first wave of British punk, with his life and work serving as the subject for works of theatre, music, film and television.

Green Day frontman Billie Joe Armstrong said of Vicious: "[He] was everything that's cool about punk rock: a skinny rocker who had a ton of attitude, sort of an Elvis, James Dean kind of guy". Steven Severin of Siouxsie and the Banshees remembered Vicious in positive terms: "Before he got deeply into drugs, he was one of the funniest guys. He had a brilliant sense of humour, goofy, sweet, and very cute." In 2009, Lydon told The Independent: "I'm sorry, God, for the day I brought Sid into the band. He felt so isolated, poor old Sid, because he wasn't the sharpest knife on the block. The best aspect of his character, which was his humour, just vanished the day he joined the Pistols."

In 1986, Vicious, an American play about his life premiered in Los Angeles and was the theatre debut of actor George Clooney, who played a male prostitute drug dealer.

The acclaimed manga and anime series Nana (2000 manga; 2006 anime) by Ai Yazawa drew significant inspiration from the band both aesthetically and thematically. Nana features characters, fashion choices, and narrative references that echo the raw energy and rebellious spirit of the Sex Pistols, making the group a key artistic influence on the work.

In 2006, the Sex Pistols were inducted into the Rock and Roll Hall of Fame. The surviving members declined to attend the ceremony.

In 1996, Anne Beverley sold Vicious's bass guitar – a white Fender Precision Bass with a black pickguard and a leather strap with the name 'Sid' etched into it – to Steve Jones for £2,000.

On 20 January 2009, In Search of Sid, a 30-minute documentary about Vicious recorded by his close friend Jah Wobble was aired on the BBC Radio 4.

In 2011, a suit of Vicious's sold at auction by Christie's for £11,000.

As of 2025, Vicious-themed souvenirs are widely available for purchase. Many recordings with Vicious have been repeatedly released. His singles "My Way" and "It's Shit" were last released by the American label Cleopatra Records in 2021. Also in 2021, Cleopatra's sub-label, Anarchy Records, released the album Love Kills.

== Music tributes ==
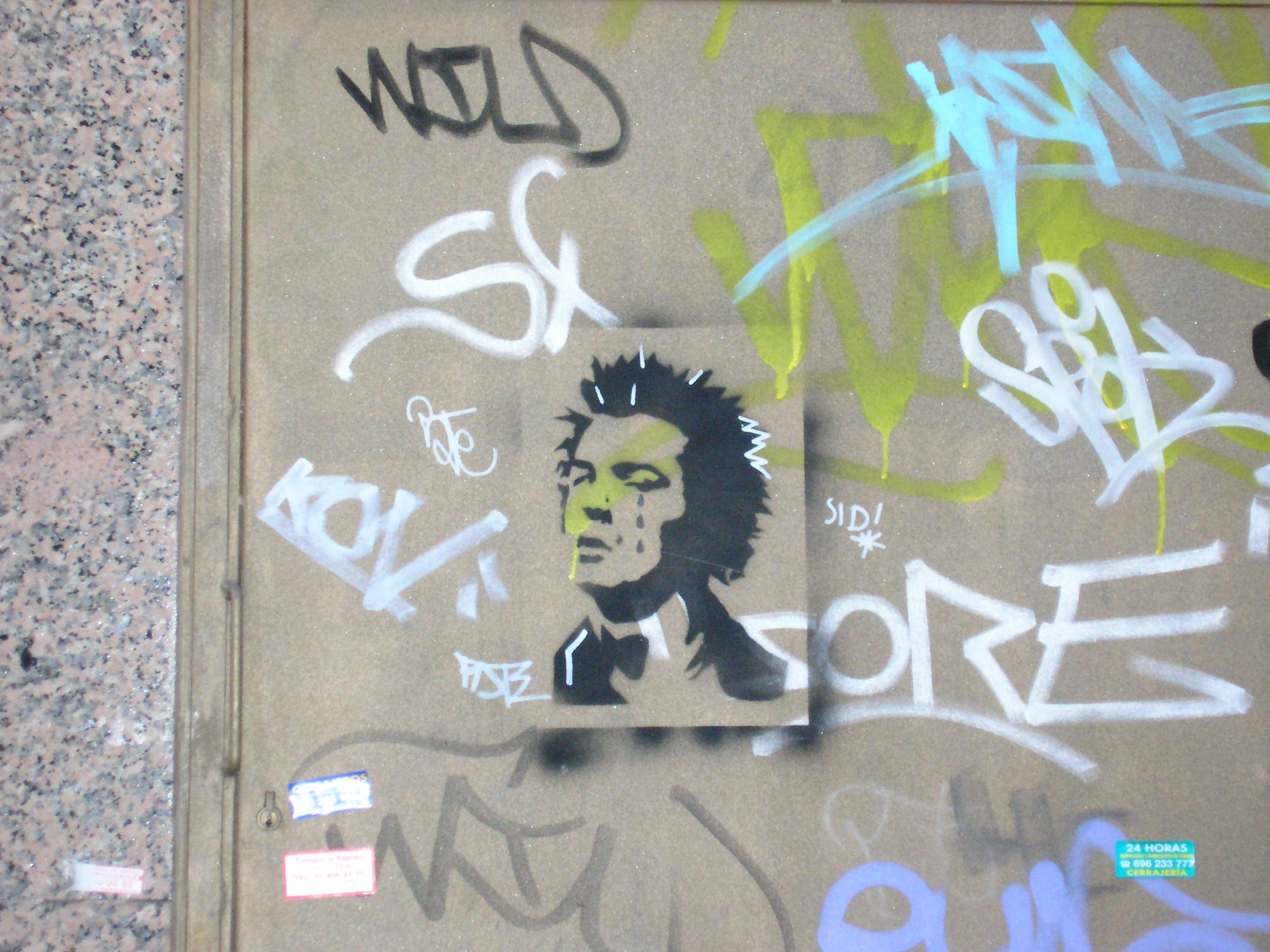
A graffiti of Vicious crying, in Madrid, Spain

- Helpless Huw released the four-track recording Sid Vicious Was Innocent (1979).
- The Exploited included the song "Sid Vicious Was Innocent" on their album Troops of Tomorrow (1982).
- Joe Strummer recorded "Love Kills" and "Dum Dum Club" for the Sid and Nancy soundtrack (1986).
- Ramones released "Love Kills" on their album Animal Boy (1986).
- NOFX released "Punk Guy" on their album Punk in Drublic (1994).
- Groovie Ghoulies released "Punk Part II" on their album World Contact Day (1996).
- Medusa released a music video to their song "Sid and Nancy" which portrays the two as children (2015).
- Foster the People released "Loyal Like Sid & Nancy" from their album Sacred Hearts Club (2017).
- Powerman 5000 released a single called "Sid Vicious in a Dress" (2017).
- Phoebe Bridgers included a track titled "Chelsea" on her album Stranger in the Alps (2017).
- Machine Gun Kelly released the track "Sid & Nancy" on his album Mainstream Sellout (2022).
- Punk band Sound System recorded a song titled “Blood on the Blade” (2023).
- Remy Bond's mentions Sid and Nancy in "Summer Song" (2024).

== Portrayals ==
The critically acclaimed 1986 film Sid and Nancy, directed by Alex Cox, portrays Vicious's life from his joining the Sex Pistols to the end of his life. It stars Gary Oldman as Vicious and Chloe Webb as Nancy Spungen. Oldman's performance was praised by Uncut as a "hugely sympathetic reading of the punk figurehead as a lost and bewildered manchild" though Oldman himself detested the film and punk music in general.

In 1993, Ade Edmondson played Vicious in The Comic Strip Presents: Demonella. In the film, which was directed by Paul Bartel, Vicious resides in Hell with Oscar Wilde, Adolf Hitler, Genghis Khan and Marie Antoinette.

The Foo Fighters' 1997 video for "Everlong" is about Vicious and Spungen, with Vicious defending Spungen against party demons. Dave Grohl and Taylor Hawkins play Vicious and Spungen, respectively.

Love, Springfieldian Style, the Valentine's Day episode of The Simpsons 2008 season, spoofs Vicious and Spungen's relationship.

In September 2009, the Roy Smiles play Kurt and Sid debuted at the Trafalgar Studios in London's West End. The play, set in Kurt Cobain's greenhouse on the day of his suicide, revolves around the ghost of Vicious visiting Cobain to try and convince him not to kill himself. Vicious was played by Danny Dyer.

In January 2021, FX announced that a series about the Sex Pistols, called Pistol, had gone into production, with Vicious to be portrayed by Louis Partridge. It is based on Steve Jones's memoir Lonely Boy and is directed by Danny Boyle. Lydon called the series "The most disrespectful shit I've ever had to endure" and unsuccessfully sued to block the use of the Sex Pistols' music in the series.

== Discography ==
Solo

- Sid Sings (1979) Virgin, Silver BPI
- Sid Vicious, 1980, Innocent Records
- Love Kills N.Y.C. (1985), Konexion
- The Vicious White Kids (1986), DeLorean Records
- Live at the Electric Ballroom London (1986), Konexion, MBC Records (re-released 2011)
- The Real Sid and Nancy (1986), MBC Records
- Battle of the Rockers, Sid Vicious V Eddie Cochran (1986), MBC Records
- The Idols with Sid Vicious (1993), New Rose Records, Fan Club Records
- The Best of Sid Vicious (1996), Overseas Records
- Never Mind The Reunion Here's Sid Vicious (1997), Cleopatra Records
- Sid Dead Live (1997), Anagram
- Sid Vicious & Friends (1998, includes Sex Pistols tracks), Dressed to Kill
- Better (To Provoke A Reaction Than To React To Provocation) (2001), Yeaah! Records, Anagram
- Live at Max's Kansas City, NY 1978 (2002), Prism Leisure (re-released 2011)
- Too Fast to Live (2004), Virgin, EMI
- Search & Destroy (2004), Anarchy Music
- Sid Lives (2007), Jungle Records
- F#@k Off You C#%t (2008), Anarchy Music
- Sid! By Those Who Really Knew Him (2009), ITN Source, Jungle Records
- Very Vicious (2011), One Media Publishing
- The Chaos and Disorder Tapes (2011), Landmark
- The Sid Vicious Experience: Jack Boots & Dirty Looks (2014), Cleopatra
- I'm A Mess (2015), Vinyl Lovers, DOL
- Love Kills (2021), Anarchy Music

With the Sex Pistols

- Never Mind the Bollocks, Here's the Sex Pistols (1977), Virgin (Platinum, No. 1)
- The Great Rock 'n' Roll Swindle (1979), Virgin
- Some Product: Carri on Sex Pistols (1979), Virgin
- Flogging a Dead Horse (1980), Virgin
- Pirates of Destiny (1989), Ball X
- Kiss This (1992), Virgin
- Anarchy in the U.S.A. (1992), MBC Records
- Sid Vicious & Friends (1998), Dressed to Kill
- Sex Pistols – Live! (2002), Eurotrend
- The Filth and the Fury (2002), Virgin
- Jubilee (2002), Virgin
- Sex Pistols (2002), Virgin
- Punk Rockers (2003)

== Film, video, television, documentaries ==
- Acceleration Punk (1977)
- Sex Pistols Number 1 (1977, directed by Derek Jarman)
- Sex Pistols: Live in Stockholm 1977 (1977)
- Sex Pistols: Holidays in the Sun (1977)
- Sex Pistols: God Save the Queen (1977)
- Sex Pistols: Buried Alive (1978)
- Kill the Hippies (1978)
- The Punk Rock Movie from England (1978, directed by Don Letts. Original title: The Punk Rock Movie.)
- Sid Vicious: Something Else (1978, directed by Julien Temple)
- Sid Vicious & Nancy Spungen (1979)
- Top of the Pops (1979, Series episode 16.27)
- Mr. Mike's Mondo Video (1979, directed by Michael O'Donoghue)
- The Great Rock 'n' Roll Swindle (1980, directed by Julien Temple)
- British Rock: Punk and Its Aftershocks (1980)
- D.O.A.: A Rite of Passage (1981, directed by Lech Kowalski)
- Decade...A Look Back (1989)
- Rock & Roll (1995, Series episodes "Renegades" and "In the Groove")
- Classic Chaotic (1996)
- Degeneration Punk (1997)
- Live at the Longhorn (1999)
- Room 101 (1999, Series episode 4.1)
- The Filth and the Fury (2000, directed by Julien Temple)
- Live at Winterland (2001)
- 24 Hour Party People (2002, directed by Michael Winterbottom)
- Rage: 20 Years of Punk Rock West Coast Style (2001)
- 25 Years of Punk (2001)
- Sendung ohne Namen (2002, Series episode "Das Gute und das Böse!")
- Hey! Is Dee Dee Home? (2002, directed by Lech Kowalski)
- Classic Albums (2003, Series episode "Never Mind the Bollocks, Here's the Sex Pistols")
- Mayor of the Sunset Strip (2003, directed by George Hickenlooper)
- Blood on the Turntable (2004, Series episode "The Sex Pistols")
- John Lydon: The Best of British £1 Notes (2005)
- Music Box Biographical Collection: The Sex Pistols (2005)
- Joy Division: Under Review (2006)
- Final 24 (2006, Series episode "Sid Vicious")
- The Sex Pistols with Glen Matlock: Punk Icons (2006)
- The Sex Pistols: In Their Own Words (2007)
- NY77: The Coolest Year in Hell (2007, directed by Henry Corra)
- Por Toda Minha Vida (2007, Series episode "Renato Russo")
- Chaos! Ex Pistols Secret History: The Dave Goodman Story (2007)
- Rock Case Studies: Sex Pistols (2007)
- Chelsea on the Rocks (2008, directed by Abel Ferrara)
- There'll Always Be an England (2008, directed by Julien Temple)
- Derek (2008, directed by Isaac Julien)
- British Style Genius (2008, Series episode "Breaking the Rules: The Fashion Rebel Look")
- Who Killed Nancy? (2009, directed by Alan Parker)
- Sid! By Those That Really Knew Him (2009, directed by Mark Sloper)
- Cuéntame (2010, Series Episode "Las dos comuniones de María Alcántara")
- Whatever Happened to Pink Floyd? The Strange Case of Waters and Gilmour (2011)
- Punk Britannia (2012, Series episode "Post-Punk 1978–1981")
- Top of the Pops: The Story of 1977 (2012)
- How the Brits Rocked America (2012, Series episode "We're the Kids in America")
- Up Yours Ft. Feral Is Kinky: London (2013)
- Basically, Johnny Moped (2013)
- Christmas with the Sex Pistols (2013, directed by Julien Temple. Original title Never Mind the Baubles: Xmas '77 with the Sex Pistols)
- Super Duper Alice Cooper (2014)
- Sad Vacation: The Last Days of Sid and Nancy (2016, directed by Daniel Garcia)
- Two Sevens Clash: Dread Meets Punk Rockers (2017, directed by Don Letts and Pablo D'Ambrosi)
- The Public Image is Rotten (2017)
- Here to Be Heard: The Story of The Slits (2017)
- Bad Reputation (2018)
- The Go-Go's (2020)
- Blitzed! (2020)
- Rudi Backstage (2021, Series episode "Die größten Skandale der Popmusik II")

Additional soundtrack credits

- Top of the Pops (1977, Series Episode 14.43)
- South of Watford (1983, Series Episode "Positive Punk")
- Fame (1987, Series Episode "Ian's Girl")
- Goodfellas (1990, directed by Martin Scorsese)
- Rodrigo D: No Future (1990, directed by Víctor Gaviria)
- The Astronaut's Wife (1999, directed by Rand Ravich)
- Performance and Cocktails: Live at Morfa Stadium (1999, Stereophonics)
- On the Road (2003)
- Punisher '79–'82) (2010)
- Juan of the Dead (2011, directed by Alejandro Brugués)
- Californication (2014, Series Episode "Smile", directed by John Dahl)
- Gotham (2016, Series Episode "Wrath of the Villains: Pinewood")
- Dare to Be Different (2017)
- Natsuki: The Movie (2018, directed by Chris Broad)
- Hits, Hype & Hustle: An Insider's Guide to the Music Business (2018, Series Episode "Revivals and Reunions")
- Professor Rex Sings Every Song Ever! (2020, Series Episode 5: "Sex Pistols")

Radio and interviews

- Cult Heroes, Sid Vicious/Elvis Presley, was released in 1993 by BBC Transcription Services. It is an in-depth profile of Vicious intercut with interviews and music, presented by Magenta Devine.
- Sid Vicious – Probably His Last Ever Interview (2000), Ozit-Morpheus Records
- In Search of Sid, a 30-minute radio documentary about Sid Vicious recorded by Jah Wobble, was aired on the BBC Radio 4 on 20 January 2009.
