= Nino Del Pesco =

American songwriter

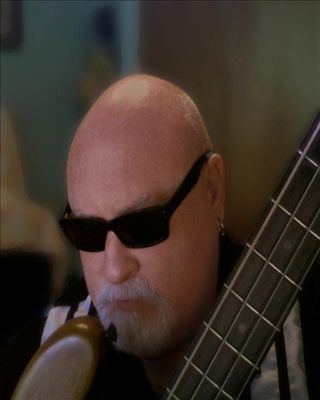
- Nino Del Pesco

Background information
- Born: Antonino Del Pesco; September 6, 1959; Santa Maria, California
- Origin: San Diego
- Died: August 14, 2019 (aged 59) Oxnard, California
- Occupations: Musician, songwriter, screenwriter, playwright
- Instruments: Bass, vocals
- Years active: 1977 – Present

Nino Del Pesco (born September 6, 1959 – August 14, 2019) was a musician known for playing in various critically acclaimed and groundbreaking bands throughout his career including the Lonesome Strangers, Snake Farm, the Knights of the Living Dead, AntiProduct, and The Black Tongued Bells. In addition to being a musician, Nino was also an award-winning screenwriter.

== Career ==
Del Pesco started his career in 1978 with the San Diego avant-garde band, "The Amazing Humans" which featured members of "The Young Americans," most notably multi-instrumentalist Dan Mareen who would go on to play bass clarinet for Harry Partch before finally settling in Zurich. The band garnered immediate interest in the scene but was short lived. In 1979, Nino became a founding member of "The Puppies" along with Dane Conover (Trees), Richard Filaccio, James Krieger, and Irene Liberatore. The New Wave band was discovered by Kim Fowley and recorded the single, "Mechanical Beat" on the Stiff America label. The single was produced by Liam Sternberg. From 1981 to 1983, Del Pesco played with "Country Dick & the Snuggle Bunnies" before moving to Los Angeles and co-founding "The Lonesome Strangers" with Jeff Rymes, Randy Weeks, and ex-Wall of Voodoo drummer Joe Nanini. The band's debut album, "Lonesome Pine", was produced by Pete Anderson and featured such notable artists as Chris Hillman and Al Perkins. The album was well received and garnered critical acclaim, but was not a commercial success for the band. Nino left the Lonesome Strangers in 1987 to form "Snake Farm" with Barry McBride (The Plugz) and Gurf Morlix. Del Pesco also worked as an actor, most notably as the guitar player in David Bowie's video for Day-In Day-Out and This Note's for You by Neil Young & the Bluenotes.

In 1988, Nino joined the "Knights of the Living Dead," who had demos produced by Dave Jerden and Warren Zevon (Zevon also wrote the band's bio). Between 1991 and 1996, Del Pesco went on hiatus to attend college, earning himself a BA degree in psychology from UCLA in 1996. Though college was the priority during that period, Nino still found time to play with various bands and continued to do session work. Del Pesco returned to music full-time in 1997, when he co-founded AntiProduct with Alex Kane from Life, Sex & Death, and Eddie Reuter. After Kane left the band in 1999, AntiProduct became the "Black Tongued Bells" which also featured guitarist Steve Dior. Both Dior and Del Pesco left the band in 2003. Del Pesco and Dior reunited in 2007 to record "Pretty Dope Fiend" which appears in the film, "Who Killed Nancy?" and is featured in the opening of the official trailer.

In 2005, Nino took a break from music to focus on screenwriting and in 2008 his first script, THE THIRD REALM, won the CineStory Screenwriting Contest, the deadCENTER Screenwriting Award, and took First Place in the Omaha Film Festival's Feature Length Screenplay category. The Third Realm was also a Finalist in Scriptapalooza and the Sweet Auburn International Film Festival's Screenplay Category, a Semi-Finalist in Final Draft's Big Break Contest, the ReelHeART International Film Festival, Writemovies.com Screenwriting Contest #18 and made the Top 10 in the Bare Bones International Film & Music Festival's Screenplay Competition.

== Discography ==
=== Albums ===
Albums On Which Nino Del Pesco Played Bass
Year	Album	Label	Artist	Songs On Which Nino Played Bass
1980	Fun Is Right	High Rise	Puppies	All Tracks
1982	Who's Listening?	Government Records	Puppies	Slang Lingo
1986	A Town South of Bakersfield, Vol. 1	Enigma Records	Lonesome Strangers	Lonesome Pine
1986	Lonesome Pine	Wrestler Records	Lonesome Strangers	All Tracks
1989	What Kind of Dreams Are These	New Rose	Snake Farm	Before The Summers Over; A Norther's Blowin In; Sidewinder Strikes; This Old Town
1994	Sweet Spot	Zuma Records	Russ Tolman	All Tracks
2003	Bootleg Demos Volume 1	White Devil Music	AntiProduct	Hey, Let's Get It On; "Sometimes"; One More Last Thing
2003	Bootleg Demos Volume 2	White Devil Music	AntiProduct	Everybody Stares; Science Fiction
2008	Days Went Around	Wooldridge Brothers Records	The Wooldridge Brothers	Hey

=== Singles ===
Singles On Which Nino Del Pesco Played Bass
Year	Single	Label	Artist	Album
1981	Mechanical Beat	Stiff America	Puppies	Single Only
2009	Pretty Dope Fiend	Peace Arch Entertainment	The Delinquents	"Who Killed Nancy?" Soundtrack

=== Videos ===
Videos In Which Nino Del Pesco Appears
Year	Video	Label	Artist	Album
1986	Day-In Day-Out	EMI	David Bowie	Never Let Me Down
