= Sid Sings =

Solo live album by Sid Vicious

Live album and studio album by Sid Vicious
- Released: December 1979
- Recorded: September 28–30, 1978
- Venue: Max's Kansas City, New York City
- Studio: Studio de la Grande Armee, Paris
- Genre: Punk rock, lo-fi
- Length: 29:33
- Label: Virgin
- Producer: The Engineer (John "Boogie" Tiberi, John Varnom)

Sid Vicious chronology
Sid Sings (1979)	The Idols with Sid Vicious (1993)

Professional ratings
Review scores
Source	Rating
Allmusic	2.5/5 stars
Smash Hits	6/10
Sounds	1/5 stars

Sid Sings is the first released solo live album by English punk rock musician Sid Vicious. It was released posthumously in 1979 and entered the British album charts on 15 December where it peaked at number 30.

The album features the two singles "My Way" and "Something Else". These songs also appeared in the film and album The Great Rock 'n' Roll Swindle along with "C'mon Everybody", which did not appear on this album. Most of the album features cover songs whilst only one original by Vicious is featured on the album, that being "Belsen Was a Gas", originally a Sex Pistols song that Vicious regularly performed and the only known Sex Pistols song that has a solo version done by him.

== Overview ==
The album is thin on liner notes; there are no musicians' credits or recording info, and the production credit goes to "The Engineer," John "Boogie" Tiberi.

The bulk of the album comes from lo-fi recordings of performances at Max's Kansas City in New York on 28, 29 and 30 September 1978.

The version of the Johnny Thunders song "Born to Lose" on this album reportedly comes from a Sex Pistols concert at Huddersfield, on 25 December 1977. During the children's matinee performed during the day, lead singer Johnny Rotten stepped off stage to act as Father Christmas, while the remaining trio played a set, including among other songs "Born to Lose" and "Chinese Rocks".

Despite having an audio fidelity not much better than the rest of the album, "My Way" comes from a studio session in Paris with French session musicians. The remixed version that was released as a single and on The Great Rock 'n' Roll Swindle features a different vocal take, an overdubbed guitar solo from Steve Jones and strings, arranged by Simon Jeffes. But on the video version of the song it features Vicious' vocals on Sid Sings but an instrumental version from The Great Rock and Roll Swindle. There is also another demo version available from the album Too Fast To Live, which is entitled "My Way (Take 3)".

Mick Jones from The Clash was long rumored to play on the album. His two sets with Vicious have now been released on CD in the double album Sid Lives, released by Jungle Records.

The album was not designed by Jamie Reid, the Sex Pistols' art designer, but he created the guitar swastika that appeared on the labels of the original UK pressings (though the German pressing had a blank spot instead due to the swastika's illegality in that country).

== Track listing ==
All tracks are live, with the exception of "My Way".

Side one

1. "Born to Lose" (Johnny Thunders)
2. "I Wanna Be Your Dog" (Iggy Pop, Ron Asheton)
3. "Take a Chance On Me" (Jerry Nolan, Walter Lure)
4. "(I'm Not Your) Steppin' Stone" (Tommy Boyce, Bobby Hart)
5. "My Way" (Paul Anka, Claude François, Jacques Revaux) (alternate version without strings)

Side two

1. "Belsen Was a Gas" (Johnny Rotten, Paul Cook, Sid Vicious, Steve Jones)
2. "Something Else" (Sharon Sheeley, Eddie Cochran)
3. "Chatterbox" (Johnny Thunders)
4. "Search And Destroy" (Iggy Pop, James Williamson)
5. "Chinese Rocks" (Dee Dee Ramone, Richard Hell)
6. "My Way (I Killed The Cat)" (shorter live version Of "My Way")

Tracks 2, 3, 10, 11 – 1st set, Max's Kansas City, New York City, September 29, 1978

Tracks 4, 6, 8, 9 – 1st set, Max's Kansas City, New York City, September 28, 1978

Track 7 – 1st set, Max's Kansas City, New York City, September 30, 1978

Track 5 - Studio de la Grande Armee, Paris, April 10, 1978

There are talking bits edited in from both the 28th and 29th sets, including quite a few from the second set of the 28th, although no music is included from that set. This helps at least make sense out of the fact that the LP's inner sleeve shows a copy of Boogie's notes from the second set of the 28th used during compiling the LP.

== Personnel ==
- Sid Vicious – lead vocals; bass on "Born to Lose"
- Paul Cook – drums on "Born to Lose"
- Steve Jones – guitar, backing vocals on "Born to Lose"
- Arthur Kane – bass
- Mick Jones - guitar
- Steve Dior – guitar
- Jerry Nolan – drums
- Claude Engel – guitar on "My Way"
- Sauveur Mallia – bass on "My Way"
- Pierre-Alain Dahan – drums on "My Way"

Technical

- Chris Jenkins - engineer
- Manu Guiot - engineer on "My Way"
- Jamie Reid - design
