= Steve Dior =

British musician

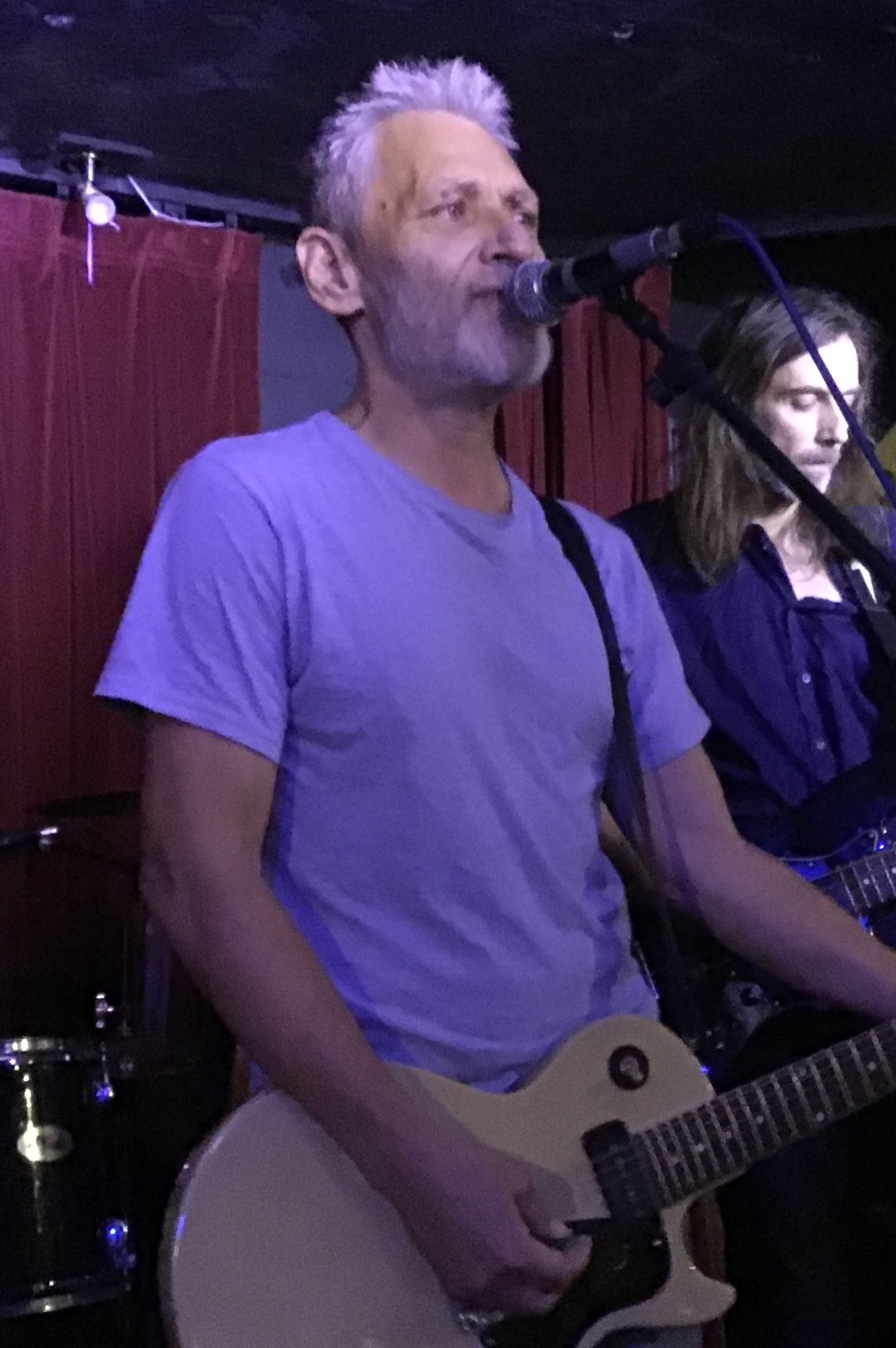
- Dior in 2019

Background information
- Genres: Rock, punk rock
- Occupations: Singer, musician, songwriter
- Instruments: Guitar, vocals, harmonica

Steve Dior is a British singer, guitarist and songwriter best known for being in bands such as The London Cowboys, Filthy Lucre and The Idols. He lives in London.

== Career ==
In 1976, Dior and Barry Jones built the basis of The Idols after previously rehearsing with Chrissie Hynde and Keith Levene and others in a band called The Quickspurts. The Idols evolved into what become The London Cowboys in the early 80s, where Steve was joined with Glen Matlock (of the Sex Pistols) and singer Russell King.

In 1993, Dior formed a band called Filthy Lucre, with his friend Phil Lewis who was previously in the American glam metal band L.A. Guns. According to Phil "We recorded a cool record called Popsmear, drank a lot of tequila, and drove around America in a van playing clubs and having a blast".

In 2002, Dior joined The Black Tongued Bells, which also featured bassist Nino Del Pesco. Steve was introduced to the band through Phil Lewis. Both Steve and Nino left in 2003.

In 2013 Dior finished an album with a new lineup of musicians, collectively known as "The Steve Dior Band". The album, titled Songs for the Wicked, was eventually released in February 2016.

The Steve Dior Band's live performance line up is: Steve Dior (rhythm guitar, vocals), Neil Anderson (guitar), James Simmins (bass) Elliot Mortimer (keyboards) and Michael Giri (drums). The band performs regularly in the Ladbroke Grove area of West London (as of 2019), and has a strong fan base of people local to the area. The set list for these performances is largely taken from the album Songs for the Wicked.

== Discography ==
Over his career, Dior has been featured on many albums and singles.

=== Studio albums ===
- Sid Sings (1979) with Sid Vicious, Paul Cook, Steve Jones, Arthur Kane and Jerry Nolan.
- Animal Pleasure (1982) with The London Cowboys.
- Tall in the Saddle (1984) with The London Cowboys.
- Popsmear (1997) with Filthy Lucre.
- Songs for the Wicked (2016) with The Steve Dior Band.

=== Live albums ===
- On Stage (1986) with The London Cowboys.
- The Idols with Sid Vicious (1993) with Sid Vicious, Arthur "Killer" Kane and Jerry Nolan

== Films ==
- Sex Pistols: Agents of Anarchy (2009)
- Who Killed Nancy? (2009)
