= The Idols with Sid Vicious =

Live album by The Idols and Sid Vicious
- Released: 1993
- Recorded: September 1978
- Genre: Punk rock
- Label: New Rose

The Idols and Sid Vicious chronology
Sid Sings (1979)	The Idols with Sid Vicious (1993)	Sid Vicious & Friends (1998)

The Idols with Sid Vicious is a concert album of former Sex Pistols bassist Sid Vicious performing with The Idols; though recorded in September 1978, it wasn't released until 1993. Steve Dior provided a recording of this performance to the New Rose record label. It was originally released by the Fan Club division of New Rose. It was also released in Japan by Teichiku Records, under license from New Rose.

== Track listing ==
1. "I Wanna Be Your Dog" (Ron Asheton, Iggy Pop)
2. "Take a Chance" (Jerry Nolan, Walter Lure)
3. "Stepping Stone" (Tommy Boyce, Bobby Hart)
4. "My Way" (Jacques Revaux, Claude François, Paul Anka)
5. "Belsen Was a Gas" (Jones, Cook, Rotten, Vicious)
6. "Something Else" (Sharon Sheeley, Eddie Cochran)
7. "Chatterbox" (Johnny Thunders)
8. "Search and Destroy" (Iggy Pop, James Williamson)
9. "Chinese Rocks" (Thunders, Nolan, Dee Dee Ramone, Richard Hell)
10. "No Lip" (Dave Berry)

== Musicians ==
=== The Band ===
- Sid Vicious - vocals
- Steve Dior - guitar
- Mick Jones - guitar
- Arthur "Killer" Kane - bass
- Jerry Nolan - drums
