= The Puppies (new wave band) =

American new wave band

The Puppies was an American new wave band from San Diego County, California formed in 1980. Dane Conover and Richard Filaccio were the chief songwriters. Dane Conover was co-lead vocalist and played keyboards. Rhythm guitarist Richard Filaccio, was co-lead singer, frontman. Bassist was Nino Del Pesco. Lead and rhythm guitarist was Jimmy Krieger. The drummer and backing vocalist was Irene Liberatore, formerly of the all female band The Dinettes.

== History ==
The band was discovered by producer Kim Fowley during a talent search of San Diego bands. They released one 6 song EP album, the self-produced "Fun Is Right" on Hi Rise Records (their label), and a single "Mechanical Beat" produced by Liam Sternberg (The Bangles producer and writer of their hit, "Walk Like An Egyptian") for Stiff Records.

Dane Connover later played in Trees and penned "Happy Boy," the most successful song by The Beat Farmers.

Bassist Nino Del Pesco played in Country Dick & the Snuggle Bunnies, the Knights of the Living Dead, AntiProduct, and The Black Tongued Bells. He played bass on Russ Tolman's 1994 album "Sweet Spot."

Drummer Irene Liberatore later played on Bo-Day-Shus!!! by Mojo Nixon and Skid Roper and on Cindy Lee Berryhill's debut album "Who's Gonna Save The World?"

Puppies disbanded in 1982.

Richard formed San Diego band, "Shelf Life" in 1984, did sound design for Berkeley's Last Planet Theatre in the early 2000s and still continues to write and post videos in YouTube.

On September 22, 2016, The Puppies song "Cat Food" from the 1981 album "Fun Is Right" received some newfound publicity when Jimmy Fallon included it in the "Do Not Play" segment on The Tonight Show Starring Jimmy Fallon.Video on YouTube.

Nino Del Pesco died in 2019.

== Discography ==
=== Albums ===
- 1981 - Fun Is Right Hi Rise Records
- 1982 - Who's Listening? (compilation) Government Records Slang Lingo

=== Singles ===
- 1981 - "Mechanical Beat" b/w "Atmosphere" Stiff Records
- 1982 - "Who's Listening?" Government Records
