= Who Killed Nancy? =

- Theatrical release poster
- Directed by: Alan G. Parker
- Produced by: Ben Timlett; Christine Alderson
- Cinematography: Nick Rutter
- Edited by: Bill Jones
- Production companies: Ipso Facto Films; Bill and Ben Productions; Double D Productions; Moxie Makers
- Distributed by: Peace Arch Entertainment
- Release date: 6 February 2009
- Running time: 89 minutes
- Country: United Kingdom
- Language: English

Who Killed Nancy? is a British documentary film directed by Alan G. Parker. The film was produced by Ben Timlett and Christine Alderson. It had its US theatrical opening at the Cinema Village in New York City on 30 July 2010. The film examines the possibility that it was not Sid Vicious who was responsible for the death of Nancy Spungen.

== Interviews ==
- Glen Matlock
- Don Letts
- Steve Dior
- John Holmstrom
- Howie Pyro
- Edward Tudor-Pole
- Viv Albertine
- Keith Levene
- Malcolm McLaren (archival footage)
- Rockets Redglare (archival footage)
- Eliot Kidd (archival footage)
- Alan Jones
- Peter "Kodick" Gravelle
- Steve "Roadent" Connolly
- Steve English
- Kris Needs
- John "Boogie" Tiberi
- Simone Stenfors
- Alan G. Parker
- Steve Walsh
- Kenny "Stinker" Gordon
- Sturgis Nikides
- George X
- Eileen Polk
- Leee Black Childers

== Soundtrack ==
The following songs are featured in the film.

1. Terrorvision - When I Die
2. Buzzcocks - Sick City Sometimes
3. Steve Diggle - Lie in Bed
4. Ricky Warwick - Tattoos and Alibis
5. Steve Diggle - Early Grave
6. Ricky Warwick - Three Sides to Every Story
7. Buzzcocks - Sell You Everything
8. Steve Diggle - Terminal
9. Neon Leon - Fast Track to Hell
10. Steve Diggle - Wallpaper World
11. Sid Vicious & the Idols - Chinese Rocks
12. Pizzo & the Delinquents - Pretty Dope Friend
13. Buzzcocks - Wake Up Call
14. Buzzcocks - Up for the Crack
15. The London Cowboys - Hollywood
16. Steve Diggle - Time of Your Life
17. Steve Dior - Who Killed Nancy? (theme)
18. The London Cowboys - Overloaded
19. Buzzcocks - Driving You Insane
20. The London Cowboys - Overrated
21. Buzzcocks - Soul Survivor
