= Jet Boy =

Single by New York Dolls

from the album New York Dolls
- B-side: "Vietnamese Baby"
- Released: 1973
- Recorded: April 1973
- Studio: Record Plant
- Genre: Hard rock, glam rock, proto-punk
- Length: 4:42
- Label: Mercury Records
- Songwriter(s): David Johansen and Johnny Thunders
- Producer(s): Todd Rundgren

New York Dolls singles chronology
"Trash'" b/w "Personality Crisis" (1973)	"Jet Boy" (1973)	"Stranded In The Jungle" (1974)

Music video
- New York Dolls performing "Jet Boy" on The Old Grey Whistle Test on YouTube

"Jet Boy" is the closing track and second single from the New York Dolls' self titled debut album. It was written by Dolls lead singer David Johansen and guitarist Johnny Thunders.

The lyrics are simply about a jet boy who stole his baby. There is little explanation as to what a jet boy is other than to say that he flies around New York City. Tony Glover of Rolling Stone described the song as "Marvel Comics meets the Lower East Side."

The New York Dolls famously performed "Jet Boy" on The Old Grey Whistle Test on 27 November 1973. Shortly before hitting the stage, Johansen told "Whispering" Bob Harris, host of the programme, that he had "bunny teeth". After the performance, Harris laughingly referred to it as "mock rock."

The original B-side to "Jet Boy" was the love song "Vietnamese Baby," written by David Johansen. According to journalist Steve Taylor, "Vietnamese Baby" dealt with the impact of the Vietnam War at the time on everyday activities for people, whose fun was undermined by thoughts of collective guilt. (Sample lyrics: "Catch me your slaves, shot at/Every rifle on the way and I gotta/Show you more mustard gas than any girl ever seen/Since I been blasted, I've been blown, I've been backing away/You've got to back it away/You've got to take a search of values/Yeah, But I've got a concert out to play") Album producer Todd Rundgren played synthesizers on the track.

"Jet Boy" b/w "Babylon" and "Who Are the Mystery Girls" (both from Too Much Too Soon) were released by Mercury Records in the UK in 1977.

San Francisco-based hard rock band Jetboy is named after the song.
