= The London Cowboys =

British rock band

- Origin: London, England
- Genres: Rock, punk rock, glam rock, garage rock
- Years active: 1980–1987, 1992
- Labels: Underdog Records
- Past members: Steve Dior; Barry Jones; Arthur Kane; Terry Chimes; Jerry Nolan; Alan D'Alvarez; Gerry Laffy; Tony James; Pete Farndon; Glen Matlock; Russell King; Phil Lewis; Phil Rowland; Steve Counsel; Neal X Dan Gerous; Rob E Lee; Wayne Gould

The London Cowboys were a British rock 'n' roll band who performed from 1980 to 1987. Formed by Steve Dior (vocals) and Barry Jones, formerly of The Idols, the band was somewhat of an enigma. Although these two remained constant and wrote the material, they were joined by a constant succession of other artists in the revolving roster. These included Glen Matlock from the Sex Pistols, Terry Chimes from The Clash, Tony James from Generation X, Phil Lewis and Gerry Laffy from Girl, Jerry Nolan of the New York Dolls and The Heartbreakers, Alan D'Alvarez, a local musician who worked as a trainee driver for Scotland Yard, and a dozen other less notable players.

== Career ==
Signed to Underdog Records, The London Cowboys released their debut album, Animal Pleasure in 1982, with the title and the cover photo taken from the film The Tattered Dress to set the tone for the record.

They recorded several more records, including their mini album Tall in the Saddle, and the live album On Stage. There were plans for a fourth record under the working title Whip It Out. Although the third album was never formally released, it spawned one last single "Dance Crazy". This featured the final incarnation of the band - Steve Dior, Barry Jones, Gerry Laffy, Alan D'Alvarez and Jerry Nolan.

After the Cowboys, Steve formed a band called Filthy Lucre which recorded an album Popsmear, and appeared on the Johnny Thunders Tribute CD along with Jeff Dahl, Dogs, Cosa Nostra Band, Bebe Buell, Barry Jones, Jet Boys, Syl Sylvain. Steve also played in The Delinquents. Glen Matlock reformed the Sex Pistols with John Lydon, Steve Jones and Paul Cook. Alan D'Alvarez briefly joined London pseudo punk rockers Better Than You before returning to obscurity. Barry is now living in LA.

On September 3, 2008, Jungle Records released a compilation of The London Cowboys, Relapse, which features material from both studio albums, various singles, b-sides, demos from Whip It Out, and four track from The Idols.

== Discography ==
Studio Albums

- 1982 – Animal Pleasure (Underdog Records)
- 1984 – Tall in the Saddle (Underdog Records) (12", mini album)

Live Album

- 1986 – On Stage (Underdog Records)

Compilations

- 1992 – Long Time Coming (Radio Active Records)
- 1992 – The Underdog Recordings (Underdog Records)
- 1992 – Wow Wow Oui Oui (Skydog Records)
- 2008 – Relapse (Jungle Records)

Studio Singles

- 1980 – "Shunting on the Night Shift" b/w "Anything You Want" (Underdog Records)
- 1981 – "It Never Ends" b/w "Hook Line and Sinker" (Underdog Records)
- 1983 – "Street Full of Soul" b/w "Let's Get Crazy" (Flicknife Records)
- 1983 – "Let's Get Crazy" b/w "Street Full of Soul" (Skydog Records)
- 1983 – "Hook Line & Sinker" b/w "Saigon" (Underdog Records)
- 1984 – "Centerfold" b/w "Courtesan (She's Real Hot Man)" (Underdog Records)
- 1985 – "It Takes Time" b/w "Courtesan" (Poko Rekords)
- 1987 – "Dance Crazy" b/w "Bleed Me" (Rebel Rec.)
