= Better Badges =

British button-badge manufacturer

A Better Badge
- Founded: 1976
- Founder: Joly MacFie
- Headquarters: London, England
- Products: Badges, Fanzines, Cassettes, Flyers
- Production output: Printing, Manufacturing Cassette duplication
- Services: Publishing, Distribution

Better Badges was a London button-badge manufacturer, started in 1976 by Joly MacFie. During the years 1977–1984 it became the leading publisher and merchandiser of 'punk badges' - exporting millions worldwide from their offices at 286 Portobello Road. Better Badges was a major player in the punk and postpunk scenes from 1976–1983 - a pioneer viral marketer, fueling the independent labels' fan-based promotional successes of the time.

== History ==
1976 4 July, first punk badges sold at the Ramones and Flamin' Groovies show at The Roundhouse, London. The Better Badges stand went on to become a fixture.

1977 May, First mass-production of punk badges for sale at Mont de Marsan festival in France.

Commenced weekly badge top ten ad in NME.

1978 Better Badges expanded from its original location in a lock-up garage in St. Stephen's Mews into the top floor of 286 Portobello Road.

Better Badges published sets of badges for U2 - their first ever commercial product, and Rob Gretton's first act as manager of Joy Division was to order a set of badges from BB.

Later, after discussions with Gretton, MacFie ended BB's unwieldy royalty system, moving to one where bands just got a flat donation of badges.

1979 MacFie purchased in-house printing equipment which, in addition to badges, was used to produce many fanzines which BB also distributed. Titles included Jamming!, No Cure and Panache Promotional materials were also made for budding UK labels such as Mute Records and Rough Trade. Some artists, such as The Raincoats and Young Marble Giants used BB to publish small booklets.

MacFie bought an AM radio transmitter so that music could be broadcast from the top floor to the printers in the basement. These pirate radio broadcasts of mainly reggae eventually led to the formation of the Dread Broadcasting Corporation, which, under the leadership of Lepke, became the first major London urban pirate radio station, for which Better Badges created merchandise and served as the official address.

1980 Fanzines published included i-D, Kill Your Pet Puppy, and Toxic Grafity, which included a flexi-single "Tribal Rival Rebel Revels" by Crass.

MacFie bought a cassette tape-duplicator and started offering a cheap tape publishing service which was utilized by pioneering DIY labels such as Fuck Off Records.

=== Staff ===
Many musicians, notable or otherwise, worked at Better Badges including Neneh Cherry and Wayne Preston of minor band Youth in Asia. and Hamish Macdonald of Sex Beatles/Sexbeat. and the Frenchman Charles Hurbier aka Charlie H of Métal Urbain/Métal Boys/Doctor mix. Others included Duncan Sanderson of the Pink Fairies, Gabby Glaser of Luscious Jackson, Val Haller of The Electric Chairs, Eric Débris of Métal Urbain, Angela Jaeger of Pigbag, Nick Godwin of Zounds, and John Walker of Warsaw Pakt. Designers included Megan Green, Slim Smith - recently with Artrocker, and Derek Harris.

MacFie sold the business and moved to the United States in 1983.

== Recent activity ==
In the early 2000s Better Badges produced over half a million anti-war badges as part of the UK campaign against the Iraq war.

Later in the 2000s Better Badges was wound up. A new entity 'A Better Badge' took its place.

In his 2013 memoir A Boy About Town Tony Fletcher dedicates an entire chapter to how Jamming! came to be printed and published at Better Badges.

== Image as Virus Exhibit ==
An exhibit based on Better Badges - Image as Virus - ran 14 Dec 2016 - 5 Jan 2017 at New York University's Steinhardt School. To mark the opening some of the early badges were featured in The Guardian.

In September 2018 the Image as Virus exhibit went on show at the Busy Beaver Button Museum in Chicago.
