= Tony Fletcher =

British music journalist

Tony Fletcher (born 27 April 1964) is a British music journalist best known for his biographies of drummer Keith Moon and the band R.E.M., and also as a show director for the Rock Academy in Woodstock.

== Jamming! ==
Born in Yorkshire, England, Fletcher was inspired by the London punk rock movement and started a fanzine as a thirteen-year-old schoolboy which he named Jamming!. Founded in 1977, the magazine began as a school-printed fanzine and in 1978, with the fifth issue featuring interviews with Paul Weller, Adam Ant and John Peel, adopted professional printing and wider distribution. From 1979-84, it was printed and partly distributed by Better Badges. Between 1978-83, Jamming! featured interviews with a range of artists that included Pete Townshend, Aztec Camera, Dexys Midnight Runners, the Damned, Delta 5, the Jam, Bill Nelson, Scritti Politti, the Selecter, the Beat, Dead Kennedys and more.

In September 1983, Jamming! went bi-monthly, and later monthly. Artists featured in this later phase included the Smiths, U2, Billy Bragg, Julian Cope, Lloyd Cole, the Cocteau Twins, Echo and the Bunnymen, R.E.M., the Specials, Everything But the Girl, Madness, and more. In January 1986, after 36 issues, the magazine shut down.

== Media career ==
His success with Jamming! led Fletcher to more opportunities, starting with a major published interview with Paul McCartney in 1982. He presented TV programmes, including The Tube, where he interviewed Wham! in 1983, and networked with post-punk figures including Paul Weller and Echo & the Bunnymen, the latter being the subject of his first book, published in 1987.

Fletcher also juggled band and record label management, before moving to New York City in the late 1980s.

Fletcher produced and co-hosted 2019's It's a Pixies Podcast, which broke new ground by unveiling the recording process of Pixies' then upcoming album Beneath the Eyrie before it had been released.

In 2020, Fletcher also launched the fitness and travel podcast One Step Beyond, inspired by spending most of 2016 traveling around the world with his then-wife and 11 year old son.

== New York ==
In New York, Fletcher established himself as a DJ, club promoter and music industry consultant, all the while settling down as a serious scholar of contemporary music history, authoring a guide to the music of the Clash, plus major biographies of R.E.M. and Keith Moon.

With the advent of the Internet in the 1990s, Fletcher returned to topical writing, with his ijamming.net website, adding wine to his musical interests.

In 2010, he published a study on the musical history of New York City in the 20th century.

His biography of the Smiths, A Light That Never Goes Out: The Enduring Saga of the Smiths, was published in September 2012.

On 4 July 2013, William Heinemann published Fletcher's memoir, Boy About Town about his youth in London.

He is currently a show director at the Rock Academy in Woodstock.

== Personal life ==
Fletcher has two children and was married to Posie Strenz. He lives in upstate New York. He became a vegetarian and later a vegan inspired by the 1985 album Meat Is Murder.

== Books ==
- Never Stop: The Echo and the Bunnymen Story
- Remarks Remade - The Story of R.E.M.
- Dear Boy: The Life of Keith Moon (published in the United Kingdom; American title is Moon (The Life and Death of a Rock Legend)
- Hedonism - A Novel
- The Clash: An Essential Guide to Their Music
- All Hopped Up and Ready to Go: Music from the Streets of New York 1927-77
- A Light That Never Goes Out: The Enduring Saga of the Smiths (2012)
- Boy About Town (2013)
- In the Midnight Hour: The Life and Soul of Wilson Pickett (2017)
- Knock! Knock! Knock! on Wood: My Life in Soul (2020)
- The Best of Jamming! Selections and Stories from the Fanzine That Grew Up, 1977–86 (2021)
