= Jerry Nolan =

American drummer (1946–1992)

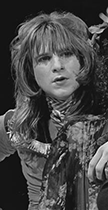
- Nolan in 1973

Background information
- Born: Gerard Nolan; May 7, 1946; Williamsburg, Brooklyn, New York City, U.S.
- Died: January 14, 1992 (aged 45) New York City, U.S.
- Genres: Punk rock, rock and roll
- Occupation: Drummer

Gerard Nolan (May 7, 1946 – January 14, 1992) was an American rock drummer, best known for his work with the New York Dolls and the Heartbreakers.

== Career ==
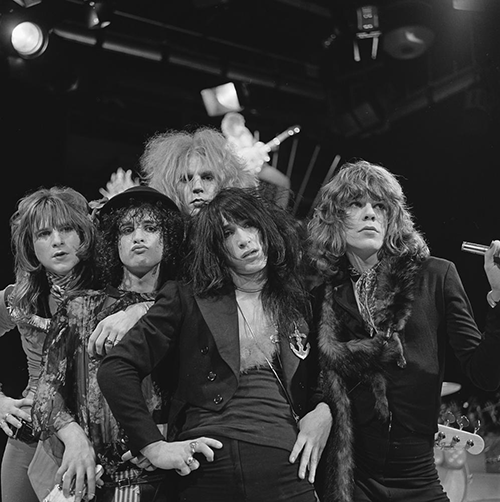
Nolan (left) and the New York Dolls on TopPop television program, 1973

A native of Williamsburg, Brooklyn, Nolan joined the New York Dolls in the autumn of 1972 to replace Billy Murcia, who had died of asphyxiation as a result of a failed attempt to revive him from a drug overdose while on tour in England, early in the band's career. The Dolls got a record deal with Mercury Records in 1973. Nolan was also a childhood friend of Kiss drummer Peter Criss, who also auditioned for the Dolls at the same time. He previously played with Wayne (Jayne) County's "Queen Elizabeth", Billy Squier's "Kicks" and was the only male member of Suzi Quatro's Detroit-based band Cradle. Jerry was drumming for the power trio "Shaker", a New York band that frequently opened for the Dolls, when he was recruited to replace Billy. Nolan played on the Dolls' first two albums (New York Dolls and Too Much Too Soon).

After much internal fighting and a short stint under the helm of future Sex Pistols manager Malcolm McLaren, Nolan left the Dolls together with Johnny Thunders in the spring of 1975. The two then placed a call to bassist Richard Hell, formerly of the Neon Boys and Television, to form the Heartbreakers. Soon, Walter Lure was brought into the fold and Hell was replaced by Billy Rath. In 1976, the Heartbreakers were invited to tour with the Sex Pistols on their infamous "Anarchy in the U.K." tour which also included support from the Clash and the Damned. Soon after the tour, the Heartbreakers took up permanent residence in London and played many shows throughout 1976–1977. Nolan quit the band soon after they released their only studio album, L.A.M.F., in October 1977 because he felt the album was poorly mixed. Nolan still continued to play with the Heartbreakers, but as a "hired drummer" until the end of 1977.

In early 1978, Nolan joined the Idols led by Steve Dior and Barry Jones. The Idols with ex-Chelsea bassist Simon Vitesse recorded four demos in London for Track Records and then toured America later in the year with Arthur Kane on bass. The Idols also released a single including "You" b/w "The Girl That I Love" in 1978 on Ork Records. Nolan also filled in on drums for Sid Vicious' ill-fated New York City solo performances in September 1978 along with Arthur Kane and Steve Dior also backing up Vicious. Mick Jones from the Clash also joined Vicious' backing band filling in on guitar on the last live date. The live recordings from these shows can be found on Sid Sings. The Idols continued to play shows up and down the east coast but broke up in 1979, the last line up consisting of Jerry Nolan, Steve Dior, Barry Jones, Arthur Kane and Walter Lure. Nolan later joined back with Steve Dior and Barry Jones in their next band, the London Cowboys, in the early 80s which also included Glen Matlock from the Sex Pistols. Although Nolan did not play drums on the London Cowboys' two studio albums Animal Pleasure (1982) and Tall in the Saddle (1984), he did play drums on their live album On Stage (1986).

While touring with Johnny Thunders in 1982, Nolan met Charlotte "Lotten" Nedeby, whom he soon married. Nolan took up residence in Sweden, off and on, through the 1980s. In Sweden playing drums and singing lead vocals he recorded a solo single with the Teneriffa Cowboys of an unreleased Heartbreakers' song, "Take a Chance With Me", and a new song, "Pretty Baby", released in 1982 on Tandan Records. Other songs recorded with the Teneriffa Cowboys throughout 1982–1983 include Chuck Berry's "Havana Moon" which was released on Sword – The Best in Scandinavian Rock album in 1985 on Sword/Tandan Records and "Countdown Love" which was released on a posthumous split single with Johnny Thunders in 1997 on Sucksex Records. The other co-singer and guitarist of Teneriffa Cowboys, Michael Thimrén (who also occasionally played with Johnny Thunders from 1983–1988), contributed the songs "Lickin' My Boots" and "Notorious Liar" along with other unreleased songs from the 1982–1983 period. Also in 1983, Nolan recorded a single with the Swedish band Pilsner playing drums and singing lead vocals on "I Refuse (To Live in the U.S.A.)" and "Sleep With You". He was also a member of the short-lived Ugly Americans with fellow ex-Doll Sylvain Sylvain. Collaboration with Johnny Thunders continued periodically, until Thunders' death in 1991.

Nolan outlived his long-time friend by only a few months. During that period he was working on a recording project with singer/songwriter/guitar Greg Allen and bassist Chicago Vin Earnshaw. In late 1991, while Nolan was being treated for bacterial meningitis and bacterial pneumonia at St. Vincent's Hospital in New York, he suffered a stroke and went into a coma from which he never recovered. He spent his final weeks on a life support system and died on January 14, 1992. He was buried at Mount Saint Mary's Cemetery in Flushing, New York. He had been diagnosed with HIV several years prior to his death.

A biography titled Stranded in the Jungle: Jerry Nolan's Wild Ride - A tale of drugs, fashion, the New York Dolls, and Punk Rock, was released in 2017, from Hal Leonard Corporation's Backbeat imprint. Author Curt Weiss was formerly Lewis King, drummer for Beat Rodeo and the Rockats.

== Discography ==
=== New York Dolls ===
- New York Dolls – (1973)
- Too Much Too Soon – (1974)
- Red Patent Leather – (1984)

=== The Heartbreakers ===
- L.A.M.F. – (1977)
- Live at Max's Kansas City – 1979 (Bonus Tracks)
- D.T.K. – Live at the Speakeasy – (1982)

=== The Idols ===
- "You" / "Girl That I Love" – (1979 – single)

=== Sid Vicious ===
- Sid Sings – (1979)
- The Idols with Sid Vicious – (1993)

=== Jerry Nolan (with The Teneriffa Cowboys) ===
- "Take A Chance With Me" b/w "Pretty Baby" – (1982)
- "Havana Moon" (Chuck Berry) released on "Sword – The Best in Scandinavian Rock" – (1985)
- "Countdown Love" released on posthumous split single with Johnny Thunders – (1997)

=== Jerry Nolan (with Pilsner) ===
- "I Refuse b/w "Sleep With You" – (1983)

=== London Cowboys ===
- "On Stage" – (1986)

=== Jerry Nolan and the Profilers ===
- Jerry Nolan and the Profilers – (1991)

=== Jerry Nolan Band ===
- Live at Great Gildersleeves October 07, 1983

Released on Retro Records - U.K. (2012)
