= Arthur Kane =

American musician (1949–2004)

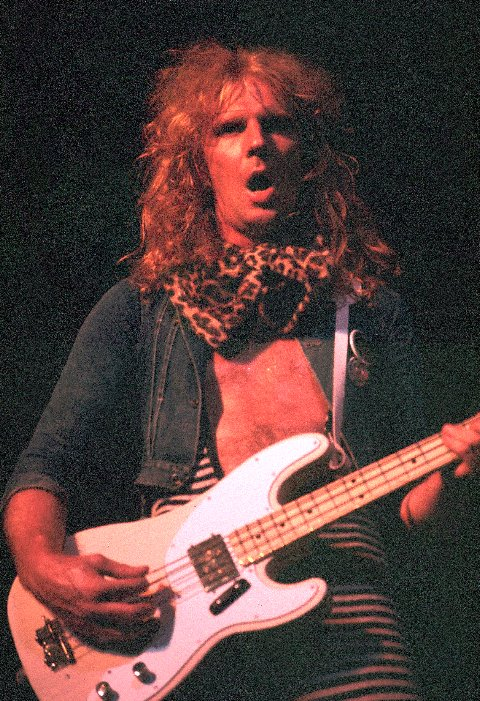
- Kane in 1973

Background information
- Born: Arthur Harold Kane Jr. February 3, 1949; The Bronx, New York City, U.S.
- Died: July 13, 2004 (aged 55) Los Angeles, California, U.S.
- Genres: Rock and roll; glam rock; punk rock; glam punk
- Occupation: Bassist
- Years active: 1970–1980s, 2004
- Formerly of: New York Dolls; Sid Vicious; Killer Kane with Blackie Lawless; Corpse Grinders; The Idols

Arthur Harold Kane Jr. (February 3, 1949 – July 13, 2004) was an American musician best known as the bass guitarist for the pioneering glam rock band the New York Dolls. Kane was a founding member of the Dolls in 1971 and remained an integral part of the band until he was forced out in 1975, shortly after the departure of Johnny Thunders and Jerry Nolan. In 2004, after decades of estrangement from Dolls singer David Johansen, Kane rejoined the surviving Dolls (Johansen and Sylvain Sylvain) to rehearse and play a reunion concert in London, which was the subject of the 2005 documentary New York Doll. In addition to his bass playing, Kane was known for his subculture fashion sense and for uttering original aphorisms in his uniquely toned voice.

Kane's nickname, "Killer", was inspired by the first article written about the Dolls in which the journalist described Kane's "killer bass playing". Kane also said that it was inspired by the adversary of the 1930s' science fiction hero Buck Rogers, a villainous character named Killer Kane.

== Early life ==
Kane was born in The Bronx, New York City, the only child of Erna and Harold Kane. His mother's ancestors had immigrated from Sweden. Arthur was close to his mother and her aunt, his Aunt Millie, who used to like to listen to Elvis records. The first word that he learned as a young child was "record". When Arthur was seventeen, his mother died of leukemia. His father was an abusive alcoholic and, when he quickly remarried, Arthur left home for good. He graduated from Martin Van Buren High School in Queens. He first played bass in the band Actress along with other original New York Dolls: Johnny Thunders, Rick Rivets and Billy Murcia.

Kane attended Pratt Institute in Brooklyn, New York, as a Food Science and Management student. During his early years there, Kane socialized with art students such as Eric Marshall in the Pratt dormitory on Willoughby Avenue. Marshall was later, through association with the retro New Wave band Marbles, recruited on saxophone for fellow-Doll Sylvain's short-lived Criminals. Kane was always interested in music. By his third year at Pratt he had stopped attending classes, was sharing an apartment with Dave Trott, and wanted to start a band. At twenty-one he inherited money that he used to move to Amsterdam hoping to find like-minded musicians.

== The New York Dolls ==
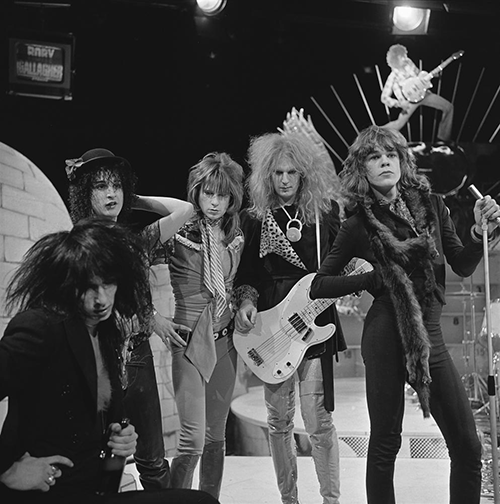
Arthur Kane (second from right) and the New York Dolls on the Dutch television program TopPop, 1973

After returning home after spending about a year in Amsterdam, Kane had been noticing a charismatic figure around New York City with avant-garde hair and clothes who would shortly take on the name Johnny Thunders. Kane decided to approach him one day in front of a West Village pizzeria (accompanied by Rick Rivets, who had heard that Johnny was a musician) to ask him if he wanted to get together sometime to jam on their instruments. Shortly thereafter they all met at a rehearsal studio, where they had booked some time, located in the West Thirties area of New York City (Johnny brought along his friend Billy Murcia to play drums). Kane later wrote in his autobiography that as he was about to enter the studio space he heard Johnny's original style of playing electric guitar: "It was raunchy, nasty, rough, raw, and untamed," adding, "His sound was rich and fat and beautiful, like a voice." Kane had originally envisioned himself as being the guitar player of the band but in that moment offered to pick up a Fender bass to accompany saying, "I know exactly what to play with what you're playing on guitar. Let's hear what it sounds like." Adding, "And it sounded great to us. We had hit the nail on the head."

Sometime after that event, Kane then approached future Dolls singer David Johansen. As Johansen explains it:

Sometime in '71–72 there was a knock on my apartment door on East 6th Street. I opened it to find Arthur and Billy in platforms with Arthur a good foot and a half taller (I had to look up). He said "I heard you're a singer." The tone of his voice was kind of ethereal for a boy with such an imposing presence, and I have to say that I was both amused and intrigued by him, so we went to Johnny Thunders' apartment on 10th Street and started to play some music and just like that I was a New York Doll.

Killer Kane was known for his outrageous outfits such as one-piece body stockings, large bow-ties, and thigh-high, neon-colored platform boots. Kane created many original and infamous looks by scouring shops in London, "combing through Amsterdam's Waterlooplein flea market during all of 1970", and "various Brooklyn thrift shops". Mixing pop art with music, the Dolls sought to create a persona as "larger-than-life rock-and-roll comic book superheroes", or as if they were a band from outer space – concepts that were expanded upon in one form or another not much later by other bands such as Kiss.

In addition to his signature bass sound, Kane had a unique way of performing on stage. As rock photographer Bob Gruen explained, while playing bass Kane "moved a bit robotically, kind of like a giant Frankenstein." Throughout his tenure with the Dolls, Kane dated a succession of atypically tall women, including Stacia of Hawkwind.

The Dolls put out two studio albums, 1973's New York Dolls and 1974's Too Much Too Soon. They influenced several bands that came soon after with the emerging punk scene such as the Sex Pistols, the Clash, the Damned, and Generation X; and were a precursor to 1980s glam metal bands such as Mötley Crüe, Cinderella, and Poison.

Their drummer, Billy Murcia, died from an accidental overdose while they were touring England in 1972. Plagued by bad management, drug and alcohol abuse, and cliques forming within the group, the band broke up in 1975 – Kane's last experience with the band that year being a shouting match in a trailer court in Florida.

== Post-Dolls ==
After the Dolls broke up, Kane collaborated with Blackie Lawless (who would later form W.A.S.P.) on a project dubbed Killer Kane, which resulted in the single "Mr. Cool." Lawless was an old friend from New York City and had replaced Johnny Thunders during the ill-fated Florida tour in 1975.

After the Dolls, Kane was involved in several projects including: playing bass in the band formed by Sid Vicious (who had a brief solo career in 1978 after the Sex Pistols); being a member of The Idols (with Jerry Nolan), and The Corpse Grinders (with Rick Rivets); and joining Johnny Thunders on a few tours in the 1980s.

These projects failed to turn into long-term gigs, and Kane began to feel that there was no longer any place in the music business for him; that what little material success he had achieved with the Dolls was to be the high-water mark of his career. Kane saw himself living in poverty and obscurity for the rest of his life. As this bitter realization gripped him, band after band directly inspired by the Dolls catapulted to stardom, and the other members of the Dolls continued their careers. Lead singer of the Dolls, David Johansen, who Kane viewed as a rival, found success as Buster Poindexter.

As a result, Kane grew frustrated with music (although he continued playing and in fact learned harmonica during this period). He relocated from New York City to Los Angeles, but he could not escape his regrets. His envy and creative block, coupled with alcoholism and the breakdown of his marriage, led to a deepening depression. Although urban myth frames Kane as a drug addict, this was not the case; his true downfall was alcohol. After seeing David Johansen as the Ghost of Christmas Past in the comedy Scrooged, Arthur, in his depression, got drunk and jumped out of a second storey window. Although a planter box partially broke his fall, the impact caused slight neural damage and affected his speech.

In 1992 Kane was walking home from a party for the Red Hot Chili Peppers when someone attacked him and he was later found in a ditch near his apartment. His injuries were severe enough that he was in physical therapy to learn how to walk and talk again. A rumor then circulated that he was a victim of the Rodney King riots, but that was another urban legend. Nobody actually knows what happened and he might have simply been mugged by a "violent street person". For several years Kane lived in a small studio apartment in West Hollywood where he was just scraping by financially.

Kane surprised all who knew him when in 1989 he joined the Church of Jesus Christ of Latter-day Saints. In 1998 Kane started volunteer work as a librarian assisting the public with genealogy at the Family History Center at the Los Angeles Temple. It was while browsing the Social Security Death Index (SSDI) on microfilm one day in the genealogy library that Kane discovered that his father, with whom Arthur had been estranged since the death of his mother in 1966, was deceased.

== New York Dolls reunion and film ==
In the early 2000s, Kane met filmmaker Greg Whiteley through his work with the Latter-day Saints, and the two became friends. Whiteley commented that all Kane ever talked about was how he wished that he could somehow get the Dolls back together. Whiteley started shopping around the idea of doing a film on Kane's life. Coincidentally, in 2004 Morrissey—who for decades had been a high-profile fan of the Dolls—offered Kane an opportunity to perform a reunion show with the surviving Dolls (David Johansen and Sylvain Sylvain) at the Royal Festival Hall in London as part of his Meltdown Festival (former band members Johnny Thunders died in 1991 at age 38, and Jerry Nolan in 1992 at age 45). When Kane called Whiteley to ask for a ride to the pawn shop to retrieve his bass guitar, Whiteley asked if he could bring along a camera. From there Whiteley filmed Kane's experiences preparing for the reunion, rehearsing with the Dolls in New York, and reconciling with Johansen, culminating in two sold-out shows in London; which for Kane was all a fulfillment of a nearly thirty-year dream. Whiteley's footage resulted in the 2005 Sundance-featured documentary, New York Doll.

For thirty years I've been ignored and been living in obscurity and been told that I'm just a loser. And now, well we want to get back to that same excitement. But I have to get used to it. It's something that I haven't dealt with in thirty years.

— Arthur Kane in 2004 talking about the upcoming Dolls reunion while reminiscing about what his life had been like in the early 70s (from the film, New York Doll)

== Death and legacy ==
On July 13, 2004, just 22 days after the reunion concert, Kane thought that he had caught the flu in London and checked himself into a Los Angeles hospital, complaining of fatigue. He was quickly diagnosed with leukemia and died within two hours. He was 55 years old. Johansen described Kane as "nonjudgmental, bawdy and holy."

Annual tributes to Kane's lasting memory and influence were held at the Continental in New York City until its closing in 2006. Singer-songwriter Robyn Hitchcock wrote a tribute to Kane, "N.Y. Doll", for his 2006 album, Olé! Tarantula. In 2009 Kane's autobiography was published entitled, I, Doll: Life and Death with the New York Dolls, with the foreword and epilogue written by Barbara Kane.

Kane met Barbara (née Garrison) when he was with the Dolls, and they were married in 1977. Although they were separated for many years, their divorce never became finalized. She was interviewed for the New York Doll documentary, portions of which are interspersed within the film's narrative.

In 2005 the documentary, New York Dolls: All Dolled Up, was released on DVD. The directors, rock photographer Bob Gruen, and his then wife, Nadya Beck, owned an early video camera and shot many hours of footage of the Dolls in the early 1970s. Edited down to 95 minutes, the black and white film shows the Dolls in different locales, such as backstage or at an airport, and documents several of the Dolls' live performances in New York City and California. Kane appears in some of the footage wearing a plaster cast on his left arm. This was the result of his volatile girlfriend Connie Gripp (1947–1983) attempting to cut off his thumb so that he would be unable to play bass anymore. In his autobiography, fellow bass player and Dolls fan Dee Dee Ramone mentioned Kane when discussing Connie, whom he himself later dated. Dee Dee and Connie's similarly violent and tumultuous relationship would inspire the 1977 Ramones song "Glad to See You Go".

== Filmography ==
Year	Title	Role	Notes
1987	Innerspace	Plane Passenger	Uncredited
