= Seven Day Weekend (album) =

1992 album by New York Dolls

Compilation album by New York Dolls
- Released: 1992
- Recorded: March 1973
- Studio: Planet Studios, New York City
- Genre: Glam punk
- Length: 77:02
- Label: Receiver

New York Dolls chronology
Red Patent Leather (1984)	Seven Day Weekend (1992)	Rock'n Roll (1994)

Professional ratings
Review scores
Source	Rating
AllMusic	2/5 stars

Seven Day Weekend is a collection of demos by rock band the New York Dolls. The tracks were recorded at Planet Studios in 1973 but the collection was not released until 1992. In addition to early versions of tracks released on New York Dolls and Too Much Too Soon, there are five tracks that were not released on the studio albums: "Seven Day Weekend", "Back in the USA", "Endless Party", "Great Big Kiss", and "Hoochie Coochie Man". Guitarist Johnny Thunders performed a version of "Great Big Kiss" on his 1978 album So Alone.

== Track listing ==
No.	Title	Writer(s)	Length
1.	"Seven Day Weekend"	Doc Pomus, Mort Shuman	3:28
2.	"Frankenstein"	David Johansen, Sylvain Sylvain	5:46
3.	"Who Are the Mystery Girls?"	Johansen, Johnny Thunders	3:02
4.	"(There's Gonna Be A) Showdown"	Kenny Gamble, Leon Huff	1:40
5.	"Back in the U.S.A."	Chuck Berry	2:19
6.	"Endless Party"	Johansen, Thunders	6:18
7.	"Jet Boy"	Johansen, Thunders	4:49
8.	"It's Too Late"	Johansen, Thunders	5:00
9.	"Bad Detective"	Keni St. Lewis	3:31
10.	"Lonely Planet Boy"	Johansen	4:11
11.	"Subway Train"	Johansen, Thunders	5:05
12.	"Private World"	Johansen, Arthur Kane	3:48
13.	"Trash"	Johansen, Sylvain	3:13
14.	"Human Being"	Johansen, Thunders	5:59
15.	"Don't Start Me Talking"	Sonny Boy Williamson II	3:21
16.	"Hoochie Coochie Man"	Willie Dixon	4:37
17.	"Great Big Kiss"	Shadow Morton	3:37
18.	"Vietnamese Baby"	Johansen	3:51
19.	"Babylon"	Johansen, Thunders	3:26
Total length:			77:02

== Personnel ==
New York Dolls

- David Johansen – vocals
- Johnny Thunders – lead guitar, vocals
- Sylvain Sylvain – rhythm guitar, vocals
- Arthur "Killer" Kane – bass guitar
- Jerry Nolan – drums
