= Rock'n Roll (New York Dolls album) =

1994 compilation album by New York Dolls

Compilation album by New York Dolls
- Released: October 18, 1994
- Genre: Punk rock
- Length: 75:21
- Label: Mercury Records
- Producers: Richard Bauer, Bill Levenson, Marty Thau

New York Dolls chronology
Seven Day Weekend (1992)	Rock'n Roll (1994)	One Day It Will Please Us to Remember Even This (2006)

Professional ratings
Review scores
Source	Rating
AllMusic	4.5/5 stars

Rock'n Roll is a 1994 compilation album by the New York Dolls. This is the first remastered release of New York Dolls recordings; 24-bit remasters of the complete studio albums were released in 2006 in a limited edition in Japan.

It features every Dolls original from their first two albums, New York Dolls and Too Much Too Soon, along with four additional tracks. Three of these tracks had been previously unreleased: "Courageous Cat Theme", recorded for a commercial during the sessions for the second album; and two demos - one of an original titled "Lone Star Queen" and a cover of Otis Redding's "Don't Mess with Cupid." The cover of "Stranded in the Jungle" from Too Much Too Soon is the only previously released cover included in the collection.

== Track listing ==
No.	Title	Writer(s)	Length
1.	"Courageous Cat Theme"	Johnny Holiday	2:19
2.	"Trash"	David Johansen, Sylvain Sylvain	3:07
3.	"Personality Crisis"	Johansen, Johnny Thunders	3:41
4.	"Babylon"	Johansen, Thunders	3:32
5.	"Looking for a Kiss"	Johansen	3:17
6.	"Lone Star Queen"	Johansen, Thunders, Sylvain, Arthur "Killer" Kane, Jerry Nolan	4:10
7.	"Vietnamese Baby"	Johansen	3:37
8.	"Lonely Planet Boy"	Johansen	4:07
9.	"Frankenstein"	Johansen, Sylvain	5:57
10.	"Private World"	Johansen, Thunders	3:37
11.	"Chatterbox"	Thunders	2:25
12.	"Bad Girl"	Johansen, Thunders	3:02
13.	"Don't Mess with Cupid"	Deanie Parker, Eddie Floyd, Steve Cropper	2:51
14.	"Subway Train"	Johansen, Thunders	4:19
15.	"Who Are the Mystery Girls?"	Johansen, Thunders	3:08
16.	"Stranded in the Jungle"	Ernestine Smith, James Johnson	4:04
17.	"It's Too Late"	Johansen, Thunders	4:40
18.	"Puss 'n' Boots"	Johansen, Sylvain	3:05
19.	"Jet Boy"	Johansen, Thunders	4:39
20.	"Human Being"	Johansen, Thunders	5:44
21.	"Untitled"	Johansen	0:54
Total length:			75:21

Track 21 is a radio ad recorded by David Johansen.
