= Lipstick Killers – The Mercer Street Sessions 1972 =

Lipstick Killers - The Mercer Street Sessions 1972

Compilation album by New York Dolls
- Released: November 1981
- Recorded: June 1972
- Studios: Blue Rock, New York City
- Genre: Glam punk
- Length: 40:19
- Label: ROIR
- Producer: Marty Thau

New York Dolls chronology
| Too Much Too Soon (1974) | Lipstick Killers - The Mercer Street Sessions 1972 (1981) | Red Patent Leather (1984) |

Professional ratings
Review scores
| Source | Rating |
|---|---|
| AllMusic | 3/5 stars |
| Robert Christgau | C+ |
| Spin Alternative Record Guide | 3/10 |

Lipstick Killers – The Mercer Street Sessions 1972 is a 1981 album of demos by the New York Dolls.

Lipstick Killers is the only Dolls album to feature original drummer Billy Murcia, who died during a tour in London in 1972. Six of the nine tracks were later re-recorded for their self titled debut. "Don't Start Me Talking" and "Human Being" were later re-recorded for Too Much Too Soon. Their cover of Otis Redding's "Don't Mess with Cupid" was never re-recorded. The producer of the Mercer Street Sessions, Marty Thau, was the person who discovered and managed the Dolls.

== Track listing ==
All tracks are written by David Johansen & Johnny Thunders, except as noted.

Side one
| No. | Title | Writer(s) | Length |
|---|---|---|---|
| 1. | "Bad Girl" | | 3:45 |
| 2. | "Looking for a Kiss" | | 3:42 |
| 3. | "Don't Start Me Talking" | Sonny Boy Williamson II | 3:42 |
| 4. | "Don't Mess with Cupid" | Deanie Parker, Eddie Floyd, Steve Cropper | 3:07 |
| 5. | "Human Being" | | 6:16 |

Side two
| No. | Title | Writer(s) | Length |
|---|---|---|---|
| 6. | "Personality Crisis" | | 4:13 |
| 7. | "Pills" | Bo Diddley | 3:16 |
| 8. | "Jet Boy" | | 5:13 |
| 9. | "Frankenstein" | Johansen, Sylvain Sylvain | 7:03 |
| Total length: | | | 40:19 |

== Personnel ==
New York Dolls

- David Johansen - vocals, harmonica
- Johnny Thunders - guitar, backing vocals
- Sylvain Sylvain - guitar
- Arthur "Killer" Kane - bass guitar
- Billy Murcia - drums

Technical

- Marty Thau - Executive producer
- Pomeroy Audio - CD remastering & editing
- Roy Trakin - Liner notes
- Bob Gruen - Photography
- Scott Kempner - Dolls lettering
