= Red Patent Leather =

Live album by New York Dolls
- Released: c. August 1984
- Recorded: March 2, 1975
- Venues: Little Hippodrome Club, New York City
- Length: 42:02
- Label: Fan Club
- Producer: Sylvain Sylvain

New York Dolls chronology
Lipstick Killers (1981)	Red Patent Leather (1984)	Seven Day Weekend (1992)

Professional ratings
Review scores
Source	Rating
AllMusic	4/5 stars
Robert Christgau	C+

Red Patent Leather is a live album by the American rock band the New York Dolls, released in 1984. It was recorded in New York City nine years earlier, in March 1975, just a month before the group broke up while on tour in Florida.

== Background ==
By January 1975, the Dolls were losing steam due to drug use and artistic differences. After members David Johansen and Sylvain Sylvain wrote "Red Patent Leather", their new manager Malcolm McLaren arranged for the group to undergo a rebrand that would include them wearing red leather outfits. He sent concepts to fashion designer Vivienne Westwood, who created leather, vinyl, and rubber suits for each member that were inspired by gay and S&M fashion. McLaren believed that the Dolls could go further in this new direction and decided to incorporate themes of communism into the group's style.

McLaren secured gigs for the band between February 28 and March 2 at the Little Hippodrome in New York City, which would be followed by a tour in Florida. (Note: The entire Little Hippodrome show was included in the From Here to Eternity box set, featuring the tracks on disc 3.) The controversial event was dubbed "Red Patent Leather" in their press release, which explained: "This show is in coordination with the Dolls' very special 'entente cordiale' with the People's Republic of China." At McLaren's insistence, a red hammer and sickle flag was displayed behind them, drinks were dyed red, and tables in the venue were covered in red cloths.

While touring in Florida, Johnny Thunders and Jerry Nolan left and returned to New York. Local replacements were found for the last three dates, which included Blackie Goozeman, who would later become the lead singer and rhythm guitarist for W.A.S.P. as "Blackie Lawless". After the Florida incident, the Dolls broke up, with intermittent returns over the following year, and their putative third album not coming to fruition.

== Songs ==
Several "new" songs being played by the Dolls at this stage in their career would show up on later solo records. The song "Pirate Love" would later be recorded by Johnny Thunders' next band The Heartbreakers on their debut. "Down, Down Downtown" would be recorded as "Downtown" on Thunder's solo debut So Alone. "Girls" would be recorded by David Johansen for his solo debut (as was "Funky But Chic", of this period but not included on this album) and "Teenage News" would be recorded by Sylvain Sylvain for his solo debut.

The band intended to record "Teenage News" as a single in October 1974 at Record Plant East, but only Johansen and Sylvain showed up in a condition to record, while Thunders did not appear at all. Thus, it is likely that some of the songs on this album would have been on the band's third studio album had they made one.

== Track listing ==
Side one
No.	Title	Writer(s)	Length
1.	"Red Patent Leather"	David Johansen, Sylvain Sylvain	3:37
2.	"On Fire"	Johansen, Sylvain	3:29
3.	"Something Else"	Eddie Cochran, Sharon Sheeley	2:25
4.	"Daddy Rolling Stone"	Otis Blackwell	3:39
5.	"Girls"	Johansen, Sylvain	3:45
6.	"Ain't Got No Home/Dizzy Miss Lizzy"	Clarence "Frogman" Henry/Larry Williams	3:57

Side two
No.	Title	Writer(s)	Length
7.	"Down, Down Downtown"	Johansen, Johnny Thunders	4:15
8.	"Pirate Love"	Thunders	4:12
9.	"Pills"	Bo Diddley	3:13
10.	"Teenage News"	Sylvain	3:49
11.	"Personality Crisis/Looking for a Kiss"	Johansen, Thunders	5:41
Total length:			42:02

CD bonus tracks
No.	Title	Writer(s)	Length
12.	"Stranded in the Jungle"	James Johnson, Ernestine Smith	3:48
13.	"Trash"	Johansen, Sylvain	3:42
14.	"Chatterbox"	Thunders	2:38
15.	"Puss 'n Boots"	Johansen, Sylvain	3:22

== Personnel ==
New York Dolls

- David Johansen – vocals, harmonica
- Johnny Thunders – lead guitar, backing vocals, lead vocals on 8 & 14
- Sylvain Sylvain – rhythm guitar, electric piano on 7, 8, & 10, lead vocals on 5
- Arthur "Killer" Kane – bass
- Peter Jordan – second bass
- Jerry Nolan – drums
