= New York Dolls =

American rock band

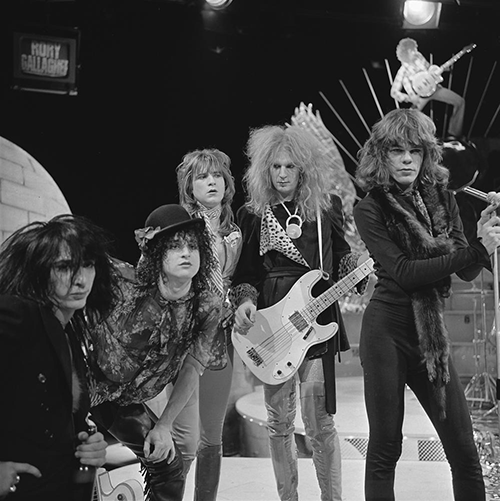
- New York Dolls on TopPop in 1973; From left to right: Johnny Thunders, Sylvain Sylvain, Jerry Nolan, Arthur Kane, and David Johansen

Background information
- Also known as: Actress (1971); The Dolls (1971; 1975–1976)
- Origin: New York City, U.S.
- Genres: Hard rock; proto-punk; glam rock; glam punk
- Years active: 1971–1976; 2004–2011
- Labels: Mercury; Roadrunner; Atco; Cleopatra; 429
- Past members: David Johansen; Sylvain Sylvain; Johnny Thunders; Arthur Kane; Billy Murcia; Rick Rivets; Jerry Nolan; Peter Jordan; Blackie Lawless; Chris Robison; Tony Machine; Bobby Blaine; Steve Conte; Gary Powell; Sami Yaffa; Brian Koonin; Frank Infante; Jason Hill; Jason Sutter; Aaron Lee Tasjan; John Conte; Kenny Aaronson; Earl Slick; Brian Delaney; Claton Pitcher

The New York Dolls were an American rock band formed in New York City in 1971, who released two albums, New York Dolls (1973) and Too Much Too Soon (1974), before disbanding in 1976. Its classic lineup consisted of vocalist David Johansen, guitarist Johnny Thunders, bassist Arthur Kane, guitarist and pianist Sylvain Sylvain, and drummer Jerry Nolan; the latter two had replaced Rick Rivets and Billy Murcia, respectively, in 1972. In their appearance, they drew from drag fashion, wearing high heels, hats, satin, makeup, spandex, and dresses.

In 2004, the New York Dolls reunited with a new lineup and later released three more albums. After a British tour with Alice Cooper in 2011, the Dolls disbanded again. By 2025, all original members of the New York Dolls had died: drummer Billy Murcia (1951–1972), guitarist Johnny Thunders (1952–1991), drummer Jerry Nolan (1946–1992), bassist Arthur Kane (1949–2004), guitarist Sylvain Sylvain (1951–2021), and lead singer David Johansen (1950–2025).

Their music and stage presence played a key role in the development of punk rock and later glam punk, with their look inspiring the androgynous appearances of several glam metal bands in the 1980s. They influenced notable artists such as Morrissey, the Sex Pistols, Kiss, Mötley Crüe, Hanoi Rocks, Guns N' Roses, W.A.S.P., the Jesus and Mary Chain, the Undertones, Joan Jett and the Blackhearts, David Bowie, Japan, Billy Idol, Terry Chambers, Def Leppard, R.E.M., the Replacements, Alice in Chains, Soundgarden, Marilyn Manson, the Cramps, the Libertines, and Manic Street Preachers.

== History ==
=== Formation ===
Sylvain Sylvain and Billy Murcia, who went to junior high school and high school together, started playing in a band called "the Pox" in 1967. After the frontman quit, Murcia and Sylvain decided to focus on starting their clothing business. Sylvain took a job at A Different Drummer, a men's boutique that was across the street from the New York Doll Hospital, a doll repair shop—Sylvain said that the shop inspired the name for their future band. In 1968, they opened up their clothing shop, Truth and Soul, in Woodstock, New York. In 1970 they formed a band again and recruited Johnny Thunders to join on bass, though Sylvain ended up teaching him to play guitar. Although there was no official name, Thunders and Murcia had informally suggested calling themselves The Dolls. When Sylvain left the band to spend a few months in London, Thunders and Murcia went their separate ways. Thunders was eventually recruited into a band by Kane and Rick Rivets, who had been playing together in the Bronx. At Thunders' suggestion, Murcia replaced the original drummer. The nameless band was eventually retconned Actress. Although they played no live shows, a surfaced 1971 rehearsal tape recorded by the group was later released. By autumn, Thunders had decided that he no longer desired to be the frontman, with David Johansen, a local blues harmonicist who had come to know the band through sharing a mutual friend with Murcia, joining the band. Rick Rivets was replaced by Sylvain Sylvain after a few months who would suggest the name New York Dolls. Their first performance was on Christmas Eve 1971 at a homeless shelter, the Endicott Hotel. After getting a manager and attracting some music industry interest, they got a break when Rod Stewart invited them to open for him at a London concert.

While on a brief tour of England in 1972, Murcia was invited to a party, where he passed out from an overdose. He was put in a bathtub and force-fed coffee in an attempt to revive him. Instead, it resulted in asphyxiation. He was found dead on the morning of November 6, 1972, at the age of 21.

=== Record deal: 1972–1975 ===
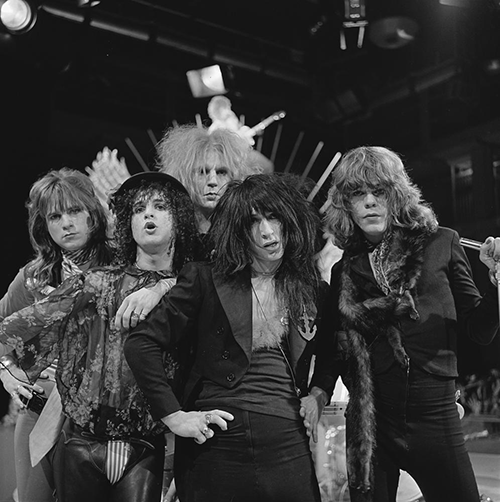
New York Dolls, 1973

Once back in New York, the Dolls auditioned drummers, including Marc Bell (who would go on to play with Richard Hell, and with the Ramones under the stage name "Marky Ramone"), Peter Criscuola (better known as Peter Criss, the future drummer of Kiss), and Jerry Nolan, a friend of the band. They selected Nolan, and after US Mercury Records' A&R man Paul Nelson signed them, they began sessions for their debut album. In 1972, the band took on Marty Thau as manager.

New York Dolls was produced by singer-songwriter, musician and solo artist Todd Rundgren. In an interview in Creem magazine, Rundgren says he barely touched the recording; everybody was debating how to do the mix. Sales were sluggish, especially in the middle US, and a Stereo Review magazine reviewer in 1973 compared the Dolls' guitar playing to the sound of lawnmowers. America's mass rock audience's reaction to the Dolls was mixed. In a Creem magazine poll, they were elected both best and worst new group of 1973. The Dolls also toured Europe, and, while appearing on UK television, host Bob Harris of the BBC's Old Grey Whistle Test derided the group as "mock rock", comparing them unfavorably to the Rolling Stones.

For their next album, Too Much Too Soon, the quintet hired producer George "Shadow" Morton, whose productions for the Shangri-Las and other girl-groups in the mid-1960s had been among the band's favorites.

=== Dissolution: 1975–1976 ===
By 1975, the Dolls were playing smaller venues than they had been previously. Drug and alcohol abuse by Thunders, Nolan, and Kane, as well as artistic differences added to the tensions among members. In late February or early March, Malcolm McLaren became their informal manager. He got the band red leather outfits to wear on stage and a communist flag as backdrop (communist chic). The Dolls did a five-concert tour of New York's five boroughs, supported by Television and Pure Hell. The Little Hippodrome (Manhattan) show was recorded and released by New Rose Records subsidiary Fan Club in 1984 as Red Patent Leather, which was previously a bootleg album later remixed by Sylvain for official release, with former manager Marty Thau credited as executive producer. Due to Kane being unable to play that night, roadie Peter Jordan played bass, though he was credited as having played "second bass". Jordan filled in for Kane when he was unable to play numerous times, such as following a thumb injury sustained prior to the band's 1973 West Coast dates.

In March and April, McLaren took the band on a tour of South Carolina and Florida. Jordan replaced Kane for most of those shows. Thunders and Nolan left after an argument, forming The Heartbreakers with Richard Hell on April 11. Subsequently, Blackie Lawless, then known by his birth name of Steven Duren, who later founded W.A.S.P., replaced Thunders for the remainder of the tour after which the band broke up. Following the tour's conclusion and announcement of the band's breakup on April 25, Duren and Kane moved to Los Angeles to form the short-lived band Killer Kane.

The band reformed in July for an August tour in Japan with Jeff Beck and Felix Pappalardi. Johansen, Sylvain and Jordan were joined by former Elephant's Memory keyboardist Chris Robison and drummer Tony Machine. One of the shows was documented on the album Tokyo Dolls Live (Fan Club/New Rose). The material is similar to that on Red Patent Leather, but notable for a radically re-arranged "Frankenstein" and a cover of Big Joe Turner's "Flip Flop Fly". The album is undated and has no production credit, but was issued circa 1986.

After their return to New York, the Dolls resumed playing shows in the US and Canada. Mercury dropped the Dolls on October 7, 1975, their contract with Mercury having expired on August 8, 1975 – five months after Thunders' and Nolan's departures from the band. Their show at the Beacon Theatre, on New Year's Eve, 1975 met with great critical acclaim. After a drunken argument with Sylvain, Robison was fired and replaced by pianist/keyboardist Bobbie Blaine formerly a member of Street Punk. The group toured throughout 1976, performing a set including some songs with lyrics by David Johansen that would later appear on David Johansen's solo albums including "Funky But Chic", "Frenchette" and "Wreckless Crazy". The group played its last show December 30, 1976 at Max's Kansas City; on the same bill as Blondie.

=== Individual endeavors: 1975–2004 ===
Shortly after returning from Florida, Thunders and Nolan formed The Heartbreakers with bassist Richard Hell, who had left Television the same week that they quit the Dolls. Thunders later pursued a solo career. He died in New Orleans on April 23, 1991, reported to be an overdose of both cocaine and methadone. An article in the Orlando Sentinel states: "[He] died of an overdose of cocaine and methadone, according to the coroner's office in New Orleans. Chief investigator John Gagliano said tests completed last week found substantial amounts of both drugs." It also came to light that he suffered from t-cell leukemia. Nolan died on January 14, 1992, following a stroke, brought about by bacterial meningitis. In 1976, Kane and Blackie Lawless formed the Killer Kane Band in Los Angeles. Immediately after the New York Dolls' second breakup, Johansen began a solo career. By the late 1980s, he had achieved greater commercial success under the pseudonym Buster Poindexter. Sylvain formed The Criminals, a popular band at CBGB.

A posthumous New York Dolls album, Lipstick Killers, made up of early demo tapes of the original Dolls (with Billy Murcia on drums), was released in a cassette-only edition on ROIR Records in 1981, and subsequently re-released on CD, and then on vinyl in early 2006. All the tracks from this title – sometimes referred to as The Mercer Street Sessions (though actually recorded at Blue Rock Studio, New York) – are included on the CD Private World, along with other tracks recorded elsewhere, including a previously unreleased Dolls original, "Endless Party". Three more unreleased studio tracks, including another previously unreleased Dolls original, "Lone Star Queen", are included on the Rock 'n' Roll album. The other two are covers: the "Courageous Cat" theme, from the original Courageous Cat cartoon series; and a second attempt at "Don't Mess with Cupid", a song written by Steve Cropper and Eddie Floyd for Otis Redding, and first recorded independently for what was later to become the Mercer Street/Blue Rock Sessions.

Johansen formed the David Johansen Group, and released a self-titled LP in May 1978, recorded at the Bottom Line in NYC's Greenwich Village, on Blue Sky Records, a label created by Steve Paul, formerly of The Scene. The album featured Sylvain as a guest on the track "Cool Metro", and the pair frequently collaborated on subsequent albums. Johansen continued to tour with his solo project and released four more albums, In Style, 1979; Here Comes the Night, 1981; Live it Up, 1982; and Sweet Revenge, 1984. During the later 1980s, Johansen, ever-evolving, decided to try to liberate himself from the expectations of his New York Dolls perceived persona, and, on a whim, created the persona Buster Poindexter. The success of this act led him to be invited to appear in multiple films: Scrooged,Freejack, and Let it Ride, among others. He also formed a band called David Johansen and the Harry Smiths, named after the eccentric ethnomusicologist, performing jump blues, Delta blues, and some original songs.

Sylvain signed to RCA and released his self-titled debut solo album, Sylvain Sylvain (1979), to minor success, peaking at number 123 on the Billboard 200 during an eight-week chart run, and a second album under the name of Syl Sylvain and the Teardrops, while also working with Johansen. Following this, he became a taxicab driver in New York, and formed the band The Criminals, releasing a third album, 78 Criminals, in 1985 on Fan Club Records. In the early 1990s, Sylvain moved to Los Angeles and recorded the album (Sleep) Baby Doll on Fishhead Records. His band for that record consisted of Brian Keats on drums, Dave Vanian's Phantom Chords, Speediejohn Carlucci (who had played with the Fuzztones), and Olivier Le Baron on lead guitar. Guest appearances by Frank Infante of Blondie and Derwood Andrews of Generation X were also included on the record. It has been re-released as New York A Go Go,.

=== Reunion, return to recording, second dissolution: 2004–2011 ===
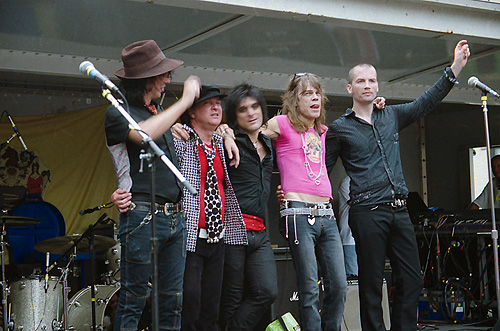
The New York Dolls in 2006

Morrissey, having been a longtime fan of the band and head of their 1970s UK fan club, organized a reunion of the three surviving members of the band's classic line-up (Johansen, Sylvain and Kane) for the Meltdown Festival in London on June 16, 2004. The reunion led to a live LP and DVD on Morrissey's Attack label, as well as a documentary film, New York Doll, on the life of Arthur Kane. However, future plans for the Dolls were affected by Kane's sudden death from leukemia just weeks later on July 13, 2004. Yet the following month the band appeared at Little Steven's Underground Garage Festival on August 14 in New York City before returning to the UK to play several more festivals through the remainder of 2004.

The band was also the subject of another 2005 documentary, All Dolled Up: A New York Dolls Story.

In July 2005, the two surviving members announced a tour and a new album entitled One Day It Will Please Us to Remember Even This. Released on July 25, 2006, the album featured guitarist Steve Conte, bassist Sami Yaffa (ex-Hanoi Rocks), drummer Brian Delaney and keyboardist Brian Koonin, formerly a member of David Johansen and the Harry Smiths. On July 20, 2006, the New York Dolls appeared on Late Night with Conan O'Brien, followed by a live performance in Philadelphia at the WXPN All About The Music Festival, and on July 22, 2006, a taped appearance on The Henry Rollins Show. On August 18, 2006, the band performed in a free concert at New York's Seaport Music.

In October 2006, the band embarked on a UK tour, with Sylvain taking time while in Glasgow to speak to John Kilbride of STV. The discussion covered the band's history and the current state of their live show and songwriting, with Sylvain commenting that "even if you come to our show thinking 'how can it be like it was before,' we turn that around 'cos we've got such a great live rock 'n roll show". In November 2006, the Dolls began headlining "Little Steven's Underground Garage Presents the Rolling Rock and Roll Show," about 20 live gigs with numerous other bands. In April 2007, the band played in Australia and New Zealand, appearing at the V Festival with Pixies, Pet Shop Boys, Gnarls Barkley, Beck, Jarvis Cocker and Phoenix.

On September 22, 2007, the New York Dolls were removed from the current artists section of Roadrunner Records' website, signifying the group's split with the label. The band played the O2 Wireless Festival in Hyde Park, London on July 4, 2008, with Morrissey and Beck and the Lounge On The Farm Festival on July 12, 2008. On November 14, 2008, it was announced that the producer of their first album, Todd Rundgren, would be producing a new album, which would be followed by a world tour. The finishing touches on the album were made in Rundgren's studio on the island of Kauai. The album, Cause I Sez So, was released on May 5, 2009 on Atco Records.

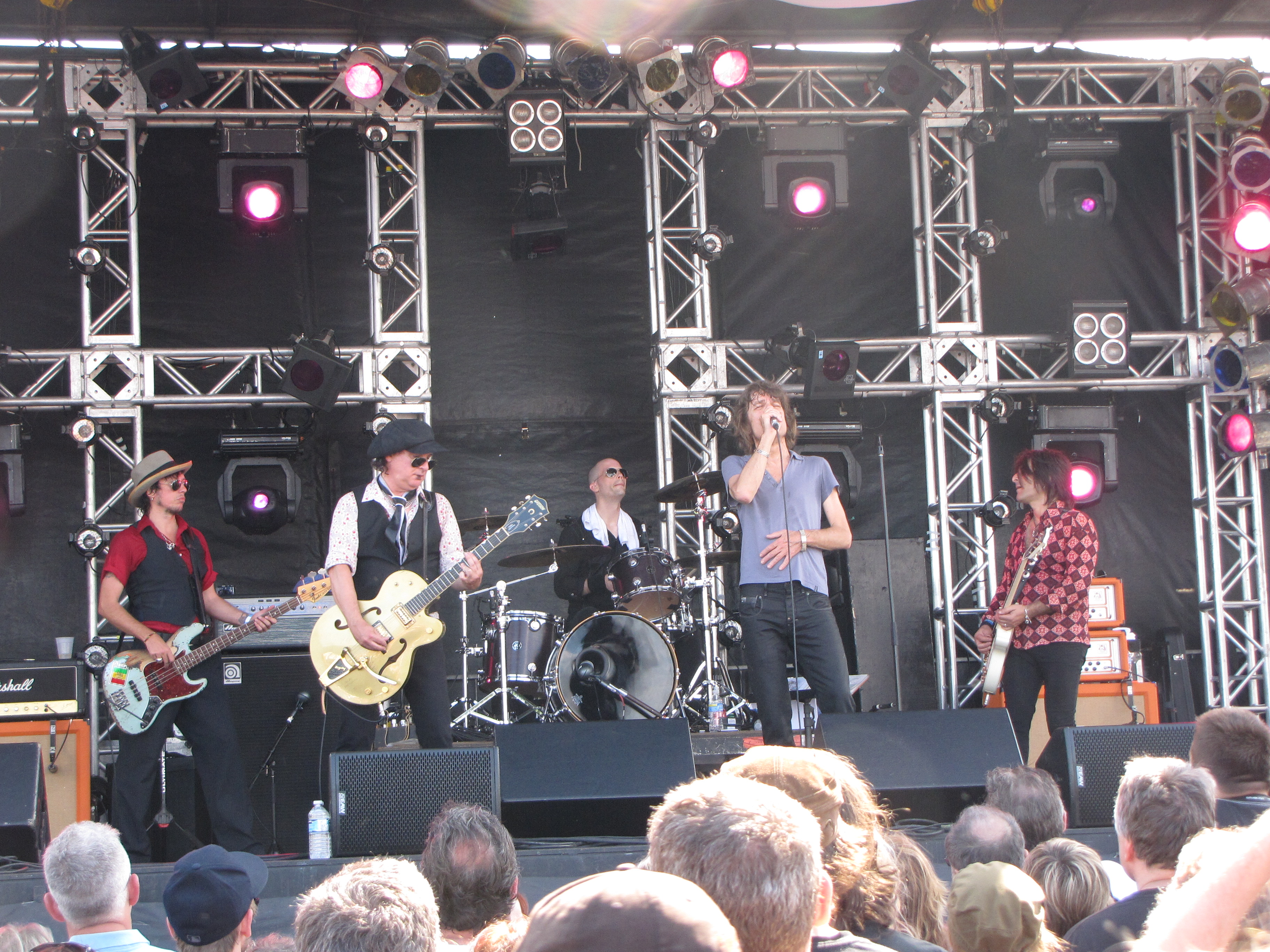
The New York Dolls, performing at the Burlington Sound of Music festival in 2010

The band played at South by Southwest in Austin, Texas on March 21, 2009, and a show at London's 100 Club on May 14, 2009 supported by Spizzenergi. On March 18, 2010, the band announced another two concert dates at KOKO in Camden, London and the Academy in Dublin on April 20. In December 2010, it was announced the band would release their fifth album which had been recorded in Newcastle upon Tyne. The album, Dancing Backward in High Heels, featuring new guitarist Frank Infante (formerly of Blondie) was released on March 15, 2011.

On March 1, 2011, it was announced the New York Dolls would be the opening act for a summer tour featuring Mötley Crüe and Poison. They announced a new lineup for the tour, featuring guitarist Earl Slick, who held previous stints with David Bowie and John Lennon, bassist Kenny Aaronson, who had toured with Bob Dylan, and drummer Jason Sutter, formerly of Foreigner.

Between late March and October 2011, the band undertook the "Dancing Backward in High Heels World Tour". This included dates in England, Germany, Switzerland, Italy, France, Spain and Australia. In the last week of October four additional gigs – billed as "Halloween Night Of Fear" – were played in the UK, concluding at the Clyde Auditorium, Glasgow on October 31.

In a 2016 interview, Earl Slick confirmed that the New York Dolls had again split. "Oh, yeah, it's long gone. There was no point in doing it anymore and it was kinda spent. You know, David really does enjoy the Buster thing. He's so good at it. I've seen him do it a couple of times this last year, and man! He's got it down, you know."

Sylvain Sylvain died on January 13, 2021, at age 69.

David Johansen's family announced in February 2025 that he was battling stage four cancer, a brain tumor and a broken back. Johansen died at the age of 75 on February 28, 2025. He was the last surviving member of both the original band lineup and the "classic" lineup on the two Mercury Records albums.

== Musical style ==
Certainly neither great nor punk in any of its variations were words applied to the Dolls when they began performing late in 1971 – awful and ugly were more like it. Moreover, at the time, the Dolls were associated with glam-rock and David Bowie in his most flamboyantly gay period, an understandable mistake.

— Ken Tucker

Clive Davis once told Lisa Robinson not to talk about New York Dolls uptown if she wanted to work in the music biz. They were petrified of the Dolls. They thought they were homosexual. It wasn't just homophobia; it was still illegal to be homosexual. People don't remember that it was the law. To say the Dolls, guys who wore makeup, were your friends was like saying you knew a criminal.

— Bob Gruen (2006)

According to AllMusic editor Stephen Thomas Erlewine, the New York Dolls developed an original style of hard rock that presaged both punk rock and heavy metal music, and drew on elements such as the "dirty rock & roll" of the Rolling Stones, the "anarchic noise" of the Stooges, the glam rock of David Bowie and T. Rex, and girl group pop music. Erlewine credited the band for creating punk rock "before there was a term for it". Ken Tucker, who referred to them as a proto-punk band, wrote that they were strongly influenced by the "New York sensibility" of Lou Reed: "The mean wisecracks and impassioned cynicism that informed the Dolls' songs represented an attitude that Reed's work with the Velvet Underground embodied, as did the Dolls' distinct lack of musicianship." In their appearance, they drew from drag fashion, wearing high heels, hats, satin, makeup, spandex, and dresses.

When they began performing, four of the band's five members wore spandex and platform boots, while Johansen—the band's lyricist and "conceptmaster"—often preferred high heels and a dress occasionally. Fashion historian Valerie Steele said that, while the majority of the punk scene pursued an understated "street look", the New York Dolls followed an English glam rock "look of androgyny—leather and knee-length boots, chest hair, and bleach". According to James McNair of The Independent, "when they began pedalling their trashy glam-punk around lower Manhattan in 1971, they were more burlesque act than band; a bunch of lipsticked, gutter chic-endorsing cross-dressers". Music journalist Nick Kent argued that the New York Dolls were "quintessential glam rockers" because of their flamboyant fashion, while their technical shortcomings as musicians and Johnny Thunders' "trouble-prone presence" gave them a punk-rock reputation.

By contrast, Robert Christgau preferred for them to not be categorized as a glam rock band, but instead as "the best hard-rock band since the Rolling Stones". Robert Hilburn, writing for the Los Angeles Times, said that the band exhibited a strong influence from the Rolling Stones, but had distinguished themselves by Too Much Too Soon (1974) as "a much more independent, original force" because of their "definite touch of the humor and carefreeness of early (ie. mid-1950s) rock". Simon Reynolds felt that, by their 2009 album Cause I Sez So, the band exhibited the sound "not of the sloppy, rambunctious Dolls of punk mythology but of a tight, lean hard-rock band."

== Legacy ==
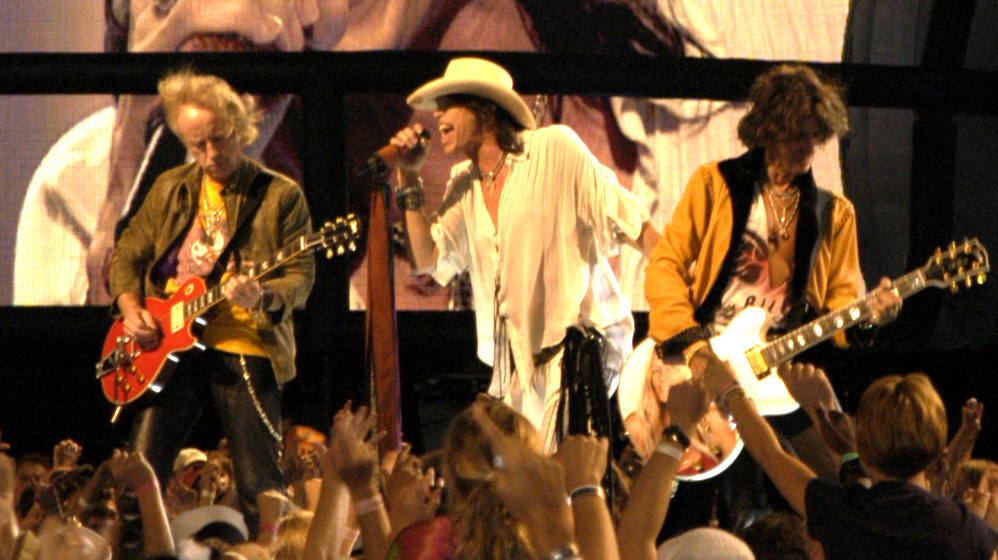
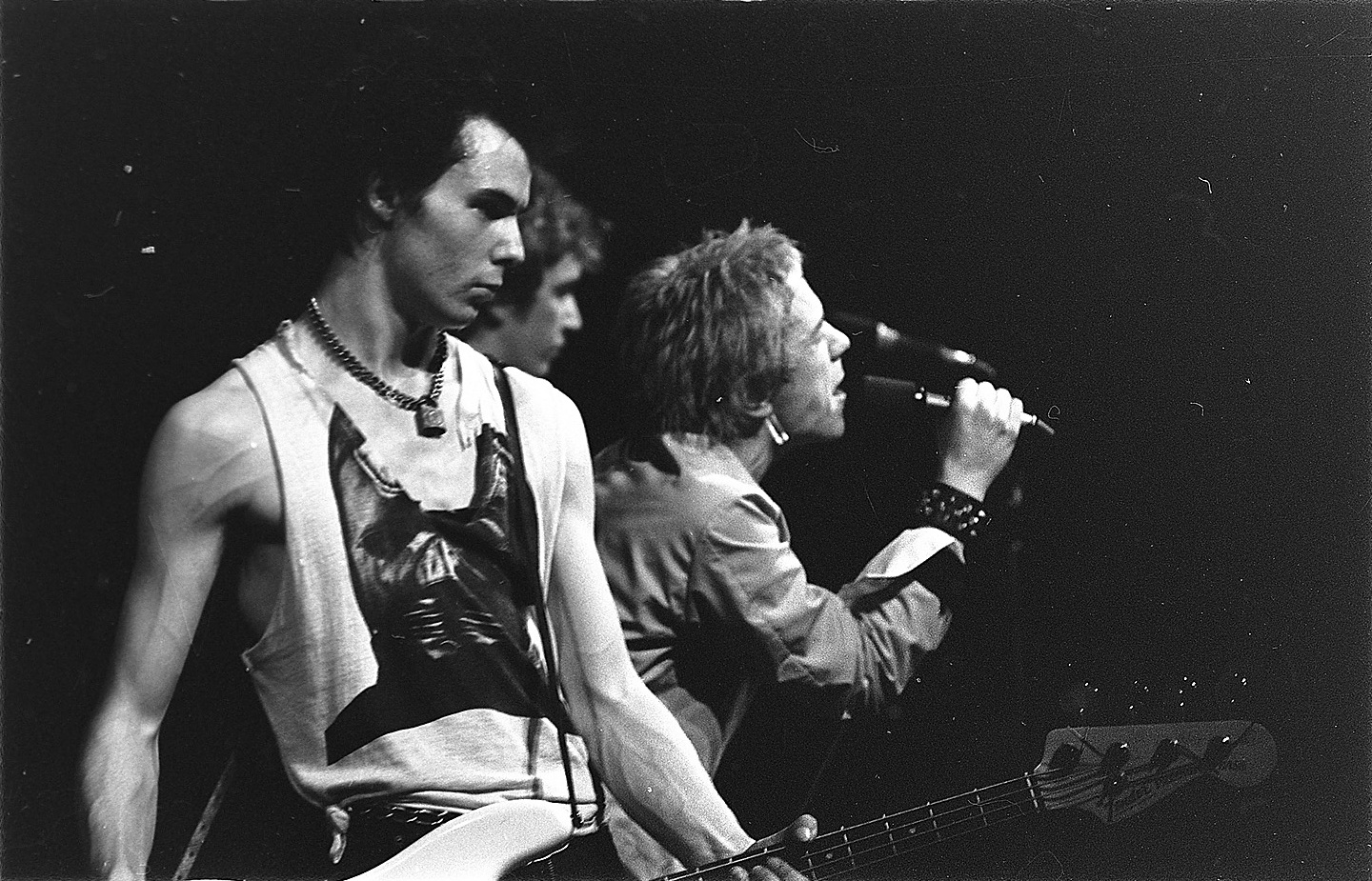
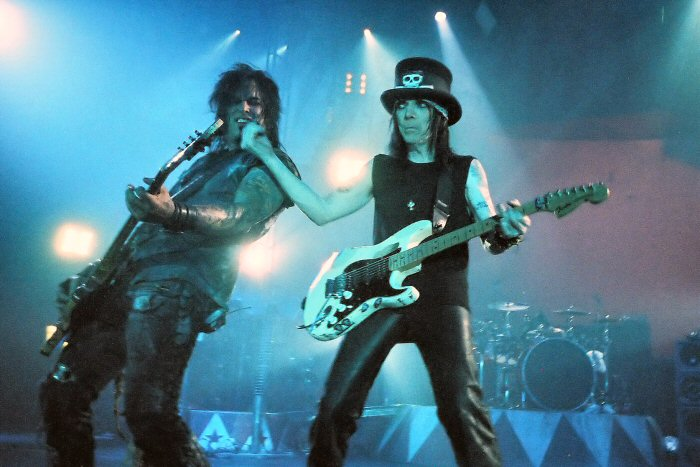
Aerosmith (top), the Sex Pistols (middle) and Mötley Crüe (bottom) are three bands influenced by the New York Dolls.

According to the Encyclopedia of Popular Music (1995), the New York Dolls were "one of the most influential rock bands of the last 20 years". They influenced Aerosmith, Kiss, David Bowie, the Sex Pistols, the Clash, Japan, the Cramps, Hanoi Rocks, Guns N' Roses, the Smiths, D Generation, Morrissey, the Undertones, Joan Jett & the Blackhearts, the Jesus and Mary Chain, Billy Idol, Terry Chambers of XTC, Def Leppard, R.E.M., the Replacements, Soul Asylum, Alice in Chains, Soundgarden, Bruce Fairweather and Stone Gossard of Green River and Mother Love Bone (the latter also of Pearl Jam), Ruby and the Rednecks, Hollywood Brats, Hoodoo Gurus, the Scientists, Palaye Royale, Marilyn Manson, Jetboy, Rock City Angels, the Libertines, and Manic Street Preachers. Writer Sean Sennett credited the band as part of a legacy of raunchy, influential rock bands predated by the Rolling Stones, succeeded by Aerosmith and Hanoi Rocks, and eventually by Guns N' Roses. By the time the band's debut album was released, they had already spawned a number of derivative bands in New York. Two of the earliest groups they inspired were Kiss and Aerosmith, which would in turn become two of the most influential bands in rock music, especially hard rock and heavy metal. Hanoi Rocks' music and aesthetic were heavily inspired by the New York Dolls and would go on to have a significant influence themselves.

The New York Dolls were the catalyst for New York's early punk rock scene, which included Television, Talking Heads, Patti Smith, the Ramones, Blondie, and Richard Hell and the Voidoids, in addition to being one of the most influential bands to the development of British punk rock, particularly the Sex Pistols, the Clash and the Damned. In Lonely Boy: Tales from a Sex Pistol, guitarist Steve Jones cited the New York Dolls as one of the most influential bands on the Sex Pistols style, and in a 2023 interview with Spin, Dave Vanian of the Damned listed the New York Dolls' self-titled album as one of his five albums "I Can't Live Without". The Guardian writer Ian Gittins called the album "the Year Zero of punk rock". The band continued to inspire punk bands as the genre progressed, with the Misfits, Social Distortion and Green Day all recalling their influence.

In the 1980s, the influence of the New York Dolls helped to form the glam metal genre. In particular, the band's androgynous aesthetic and wearing of spandex, dresses, high heels and teased hair were widely imitated amongst bands in the genre. Alternative Press writer Tim Stegall even credited the band as having invented the look of glam metal, and in Baker's Biographical Dictionary of Musicians, Hank Bordowitz called the band the progenitors of hair metal and "the most important band that most people never heard". Prominent glam metal bands to take influence from the New York Dolls included Mötley Crüe, Poison, Ratt, Skid Row and Twisted Sister. With the increasing commercialisation of glam metal as the 1980s progressed, a number of bands from within its scene formed a new sound with a greater emphasis on the influence of the New York Dolls, namely Guns N' Roses, L.A. Guns and Faster Pussycat.

== Band members ==
Former

- Arthur Kane – bass guitar (1971–1975, 2004; his death)
- Johnny Thunders – lead guitar (1971–1975; died 1991), lead vocals (1971, occasional 1974–1975), backing vocals (1971–1975)
- Billy Murcia – drums (1971–1972; his death)
- Rick Rivets – rhythm guitar (1971; died 2019)
- David Johansen – lead vocals, occasional harmonica (1971–1975, 1975–1976, 2004–2011; died 2025)
- Sylvain Sylvain – rhythm guitar (1971–1975, 1975–1976, 2004–2010; died 2021), piano (1972–1975, 2004–2005, 2007–2011), occasional lead vocals (1975), lead guitar (1975–1976), bass guitar (2011)
- Jerry Nolan – drums (1972–1975; died 1992)
- Peter Jordan – bass guitar (touring 1973, 1974 and 1975; 1975–1976)
- Tony Machine – drums (1975, 1975–1976)
- Steven Duren (Blackie Lawless) – lead guitar (1975)
- Chris Robison – keyboards (1975–1976; died 2021)
- Bobby Blaine – keyboards (1976)
- Steve Conte – lead guitar, backing vocals (2004–2010), rhythm guitar (2008–2009)
- John Conte – bass guitar (2004)
- Gary Powell – drums (2004)
- Brian Koonin – keyboards (2005–2006)
- Brian Delaney – drums (2005–2011)
- Sami Yaffa – bass guitar (2005–2010)
- Aaron Lee Tasjan – lead guitar (2008–2009)
- Frank Infante – lead guitar (2010–2011)
- Jason Hill – bass guitar, backing vocals (2010–2011)
- Jason Sutter – drums (2011)
- Kenny Aaronson – bass guitar (2011)
- Earl Slick – lead guitar (2011)
- Clayton Pitcher – guitar (2011)

Timeline

Original period

Reunion period

== Discography ==
=== Studio albums ===
Title	Details	Peak chart positions							
Title	Details	US (BB)	US (CB)	US Ind.	CAN	FIN	FRA	SCO	UK
New York Dolls	Released: July 27, 1973; Label: Mercury; Format: LP, cassette	116	45	—	81	—	—	91	—
Too Much Too Soon	Released: May 10, 1974; Label: Mercury; Format: LP, cassette	167	98	—	—	—	—	—	165 (Note: Too Much Too Soon did not chart in the UK on initial release.)
One Day It Will Please Us to Remember Even This	Released: July 25, 2006; Label: Roadrunner; Format: LP, CD, streaming	129	–	8	—	23	124	—	130
Cause I Sez So	Released: May 5, 2009; Label: Atco; Format: LP, CD, streaming	159	–	—	—	—	—	—	188
Dancing Backward in High Heels	Released: March 15, 2011; Label: 429; Format: LP, CD, streaming	—	–	37	—	—	—	—	—

=== Demo albums ===
- Lipstick Killers – The Mercer Street Sessions 1972 (1981)
- Seven Day Weekend (1992)
- Actress: Birth of The New York Dolls (2000)
- Endless Party (2000)
- Private World - The Complete Early Studio Demos 1972–1973 (2006)

=== Live albums ===
- Red Patent Leather (1984)
- Paris Le Trash (1993)
- Live In Concert, Paris 1974 (1998)
- The Glamorous Life Live (1999)
- From Paris with Love (L.U.V) (2002)
- Morrissey Presents: The Return Of New York Dolls Live From Royal Festival Hall (2004)
- Live At the Filmore East (2008)
- Viva Le Trash '74 (2009)
- French Kiss '74 (2013)
- Butterflyin' (2015)

=== Compilation albums ===
- New York Dolls / Too Much Too Soon (1977)
- Very Best of New York Dolls (1977)
- Night of the Living Dolls (1985)
- The Best of the New York Dolls (1985)
- Super Best Collection (1990)
- Rock'n Roll (1994)
- Hootchie Kootchie Dolls (1998)
- The Glam Rock Hits (1999)
- Endless Party (2000)
- New York Tapes 72/73 (2000)
- Great Big Kiss (reissue of Seven Day Weekend and Red Patent Leather, 2002)
- Looking For A Kiss (2003)
- Manhattan Mayhem (2003)
- 20th Century Masters – the Millennium collection: the best of New York Dolls (2003)

=== Singles ===
- "Personality Crisis" / "Looking for a Kiss" (1973)
- "Trash" / "Personality Crisis" (1973)
- "Jet Boy" / "Vietnamese Baby" (1973)
- "Stranded in the Jungle" / "Don't Start Me Talkin'" (1974)
- "(There's Gonna Be A) Showdown" / "Puss 'n' Boots" (1974)
- "Jet Boy" // "Babylon" / "Who Are the Mystery Girls" (1977, UK)
- "Bad Girl" / "Subway Train" (1978, Germany)
- "Gimme Luv and Turn On the Light" (2006)
- "Fool for You Baby" (2011)
