= Irving D. Chais =

American businessman and craftsman

Irving D. Chais (August 22, 1925 – April 24, 2009) was an American businessman and craftsman who owned the New York Doll Hospital from 1964 until 2009. He also acted as "Chief Surgeon" for the hospital. Chais's grandfather, an immigrant from Germany, founded the establishment as a wig shop and beauty parlor, but in 1900 he converted to doll repair after noticing a demand for the business.

Born in 1925, Chais graduated from the City of New York College and joined the U.S. Army. Chais fought in World War II. After returning from the war he joined the family business. Chais bought the shop from his sister in the 1960s. Due to the unusual nature of his business Chais and the hospital have been featured in numerous newspaper articles and books.

Chais worked alongside two other employees and repaired thousands of dolls and other toys. He stated in an interview with The New York Times that he once had a 90-year-old man come in to get a Popeye doll repaired. "It was like he was a 6-year-old kid," Chais said. "People get very attached to these things. Sometimes you have dolls and animals that have been in the family for five and six generations," he said in another interview.

Chais ran the hospital until March 2009. He died on April 24, 2009, after a long illness.

Musician Sylvain Sylvain worked at a clothing store across the street from the New York Doll Hospital; Chais' repair shop inspired the name of Sylvain's influential punk band the New York Dolls.
