= One Day It Will Please Us to Remember Even This =

Studio album by New York Dolls
- Released: July 25, 2006
- Studio: The School House, Shelter Island, The Shed
- Genre: Rock, rock and roll
- Length: 47:50
- Label: Roadrunner
- Producer: Jack Douglas

New York Dolls chronology
Rock'n Roll (1994)	One Day It Will Please Us to Remember Even This (2006)	Cause I Sez So (2009)

One Day It Will Please Us to Remember Even This is the third studio album by the American hard rock band New York Dolls. It was the group's first release of original material since their 1974 album Too Much Too Soon. The album was produced by Jack Douglas and written mostly by band members David Johansen and Sylvain Sylvain.

One Day It Will Please Us to Remember Even This was released by Roadrunner Records on July 24, 2006, in the United Kingdom and July 25 in the United States. It charted at number 129 on the U.S. Billboard 200 and received positive reviews from most critics.

== Background ==
At the behest of Morrissey, the group's surviving original members David Johansen, Sylvain Sylvain, and Arthur Kane reunited the Dolls to perform at the 2004 Meltdown Festival in London, with Steve Conte, Brian Delaney and Brian Koonin joining the band for the performance. Shortly after the show, Kane died due to undiagnosed leukemia, leaving Johansen and Sylvain as the only living original members. Sami Yaffa replaced Kane on bass when they returned to the studio for this album.

The title is a reference to Virgil's Aeneid, 1.203: forsan et haec olim meminisse iuvabit. Guest artists on the album include Michael Stipe, Laura Jane Grace, and Iggy Pop. A special limited-edition version of the album was released with the bonus track "Seventeen" featuring blues musician Bo Diddley and a making-of-the-album DVD entitled On the Lip. The album cover was featured in the iPod nano 4th generation poster. Johansen said of the album, "It's a rock'n'roll record, and not a lot of people make rock'n'roll records today. They make weird marching music, or Hitler Youth rally music. Sheesh, there are some fucked-up records out there."

== Critical reception ==
Professional ratings
Review scores
Source	Rating
AllMusic	4/5 stars
Blender	4/5 stars
Entertainment Weekly	B+
The Guardian	3/5 stars
NME	4/10
The Observer	5/5 stars
Pitchfork	6/10
Rolling Stone	4/5 stars
Spin	4/5 stars
Uncut	4/5 stars

One Day It Will Please Us to Remember Even This was met with generally positive reviews. At Metacritic, which assigns a normalised rating out of 100 to reviews from mainstream publications, the album received an average score of 75, based on 25 reviews.

Reviewing the album for Spin, Doug Brod hailed it as "a striking return to form" for the band, while Q magazine called it a "career highlight" in the group's discography. According to Dotmusic writer Jamie Gill, the album succeeded as a resolute "back to basics rock record" and weltering exploration of decadent rock and roll. Andrew Perry from The Observer felt it was the kind of boisterous, playful collection of songs "which, genuinely, nobody has the spirit or wit to put together these days". In the opinion of Rolling Stone's David Fricke, the intense record reconciled the frenzied music of the band's early years with the matured formalism of David Johansen's 1978 self-titled solo album. AllMusic's Mark Deming believed the songs were philosophical, multisyllabic, and surprisingly intellectual for a group that was once decadent and fashionably punk. Writing in Blender, Robert Christgau deemed Johansen a "far more practiced and studied" songwriter, who "mourns mortality and celebrates contingency in the most searching lyrics of the year—lyrics deepened by how much fun the band is having"; he assigned it an "A+" grade in his "Consumer Guide" review.

Some reviewers expressed reservations. Pitchfork journalist Stuart Berman observed a less provocative style from the New York Dolls, writing that they sounded too humbled and restrained. Greg Kot of the Chicago Tribune said the band's new members lacked "personality", while NME magazine dismissed the new line-up as "an above-average pub-rock band". Charlotte Robinson from PopMatters was confounded by the songwriting and described the album as "an odd little number perched somewhere between being embarrassing Dolls-by-numbers and true to the original band's memory". Leonie Cooper of The Guardian found the "beefed-up production and Johansen's more gravelly voice" predictable, although he felt their songwriting had matured.

At the end of 2006, One Day It Will Please Us to Remember Even This appeared on several critics' lists of the year's best albums. It was voted the 43rd best record of the year in The Village Voice's annual Pazz & Jop poll and was ranked 29th by The Observer, 27th by Mojo, 17th by Blender, 12th by Rolling Stone, 8th by Classic Rock, and 4th by Hits. Christgau named it his album of the year, and in 2009, he ranked it as the ninth best album of the 2000s decade.

== Track listing ==
All lyrics are written by David Johansen; all music is composed by Sylvain Sylvain, unless otherwise noted.

No.	Title	Music	Length
1.	"We're All in Love"	Sami Yaffa	4:38
2.	"Runnin' Around"		4:11
3.	"Plenty of Music"		4:00
4.	"Dance Like a Monkey"		3:38
5.	"Punishing World"	Steve Conte	2:37
6.	"Maimed Happiness"		3:15
7.	"Fishnets and Cigarettes"		3:13
8.	"Gotta Get Away from Tommy"	Conte	2:27
9.	"Dancing on the Lip of a Volcano"		4:18
10.	"I Ain't Got Nothing"	Brian Koonin	4:27
11.	"Rainbow Store"	Conte	2:57
12.	"Gimme Luv and Turn on the Light"		3:18
13.	"Take a Good Look at My Good Looks"	Sylvain, Conte	5:00
14.	"Seventeen" (bonus track)		4:27
Total length:			47:50

== Personnel ==
Credits are adapted from the album's liner notes.

=== New York Dolls ===
- Steve Conte – guitar
- Brian Delaney – drums
- David Johansen – vocals, harmonica
- Brian Koonin – piano
- Sylvain Sylvain – guitar
- Sami Yaffa – bass

=== Additional personnel ===
- Bo Diddley – guitar on "Seventeen"
- Colin Douglas – percussion, congas on "Dance Like a Monkey"
- Laura Jane Grace (credited as Tom Gabel) – vocals on "Punishing World" and "We're All In Love"
- Iggy Pop – vocals on "Gimme Luv and Turn on the Light"
- Andy Snitzer – saxophone on "Maimed Happiness"
- Michael Stipe – vocals on "Dancing on the Lip of a Volcano"

=== Production ===
- Greg Calbi – mastering
- Sebastian Cotron – assistant engineering
- Blake Douglas – Pro Tools engineering
- Jack Douglas – mixing, production
- Jay Messina – engineering

== Charts ==
Chart (2006)	Peak position
Finnish Albums Chart	3
French Albums Chart	124
UK Albums Chart	130
US Billboard 200	129
US Top Independent Albums	8
