= Cause I Sez So =

Studio album by New York Dolls
- Released: May 5, 2009
- Studio: Utopia Sound Studio
- Genre: Garage rock
- Length: 46:26
- Label: Atco
- Producer: Todd Rundgren

New York Dolls chronology
One Day It Will Please Us to Remember Even This (2006)	Cause I Sez So (2009)	Dancing Backward in High Heels (2011)

Cause I Sez So is the fourth studio album (and second after their reunion) by the New York Dolls. It was released on May 5, 2009, by Atco Records. The album was produced by Todd Rundgren, who also produced their self-titled debut album. One of the songs, "Trash", is a reggae-style remake of a song that originally appeared on their debut album. The album peaked at number 159 at the Billboard 200.

== Critical reception ==
Professional ratings
Aggregate scores
Source	Rating
AnyDecentMusic?	5.3/10
Metacritic	73/100
Review scores
Source	Rating
AllMusic	4/5 stars
The A.V. Club	B+
The Austin Chronicle	3/5 stars
Boston Phoenix	4/4 stars
The Daily Telegraph	3/5 stars
MSN Music	A−
PopMatters	7/10
Record Collector	4/5 stars
Rolling Stone	3/5 stars
Spin	5/10

Cause I Sez So was met with generally positive reviews. At Metacritic, which assigns a normalised rating out of 100 to reviews from mainstream publications, it received an average score of 73, based on 17 reviews.

Michaelangelo Matos of The A.V. Club found the album "life-affirming" overall, while The Daily Telegraph critic Andrew Perry said the Dolls are "in rude creative health" on their "tidiest [album] ever, and their most contemplative". The Boston Globe's Jonathan Perry regarded it as "classic New York Dolls" full of "heart, soul, and swagger", and concluded, "Johansen's bowery rasp still has the texture of old shoe leather, but against improbable odds and the ravages of time, it somehow works beautifully." While surprised at the band's newfound appreciation for "a range of rock styles so disdained by punk", Andy Gill of The Independent believed the album is "far better than we had any right to expect". Writing for MSN Music, Robert Christgau conceded it is the first of the Dolls' albums that is "less than epochal", but ultimately observed redeeming qualities:

Not all the tunes are surefire. Its garage-rock derivative is several degrees bluesier than the permanently exploding protopunk they reprise on the closing 'Exorcism of Despair' just in case you forgot the thrill. And the Buddhism is more overt: post-flagellant culture, existence as a temptation, 'Offering the modern crowd an absolute/Worthy of its nothingness.' Just in case you forgot the frame of reference, however, there's also a skanking remake of 'Trash.' And in the end David Johansen's lyrics somehow combine extreme skepticism, metaphysical despair, romantic agony, rock-solid agape and luv l-u-v.

Steve Kandell from Spin was more critical, disregarding Cause I Sez So as "all fun and harmless garage blooze ... ultimately as trifling as their '73 debut was essential".

== Track listing ==
All tracks are written by David Johansen & Sylvain Sylvain, unless otherwise noted.

No.	Title	Writer(s)	Length
1.	"Cause I Sez So"		3:06
2.	"Muddy Bones"	David Johansen, Sami Yaffa	3:00
3.	"Better Than You"	David Johansen, Steve Conte	3:22
4.	"Lonely So Long"		4:05
5.	"My World"		3:26
6.	"This Is Ridiculous"	David Johansen, Steve Conte	3:15
7.	"Temptation to Exist"	David Johansen, Sami Yaffa, Steve Conte	4:02
8.	"Making Rain"		4:06
9.	"Drowning"		3:32
10.	"Nobody Got No Bizness"	David Johansen, Sylvain Sylvain, Steve Conte	2:58
11.	"Trash"		3:52
12.	"Exorcism of Despair"		4:17
13.	"Lipstick, Powder & Paint" (iTunes bonus track)	Jess Stone	4:17
Total length:			46:26

== Personnel ==
New York Dolls

- David Johansen – vocals
- Sylvain Sylvain – guitar, backing vocals
- Steve Conte – guitar, backing vocals
- Sami Yaffa – bass, maracas, melodica, backing vocals
- Brian Delaney – drums

Production

- Todd Rundgren – production, mixing
- Greg Calbi – mastering

== Charts ==
Chart (2009)	Peak position
UK Albums (OCC)	188
US Billboard 200	159
