= Billy Murcia =

Colombian drummer (1951–1972)

- Born: October 9, 1951; Bogotá, Colombia
- Died: November 6, 1972 (aged 21) London, England
- Occupation: Drummer

Billy Murcia (October 9, 1951 – November 6, 1972) was a Colombian musician who was the original drummer for the New York Dolls.

== Biography ==
Murcia was born in Bogotá, Colombia, and raised in Jackson Heights, New York, United States.

He and Sylvain Sylvain both attended Quintano's School for Young Professionals, in the late sixties. It was at Quintano's that they met Johnny Thunders, also a student there. They made their musical debut in 1967, in a band called "The Pox". They owned and co-managed a clothing business called "Truth and Soul". Murcia was a fundamental ingredient of the original New York Dolls sound and played during their now-legendary series of weekly shows at the Mercer Arts Center.

While on a brief tour of England in 1972, Murcia was invited to a party where he began overdosing on pills similar to methaqualone. Rather than calling for an ambulance, most attending the party departed quickly. The few remaining put him into a bathtub and ran the water, where he then drowned. He died before the New York Dolls recorded their first album and was later replaced by Jerry Nolan in 1973. The final gig of their tour, at the Manchester Hardrock, was canceled, and the band flew back to New York City. Murcia can be heard playing live with the New York Dolls on Lipstick Killers: The Mercer Street Sessions.

Johnny Thunders wrote a song called "Billy Boy", in honor of his friend and former band member. It was recorded on Que Sera Sera in 1985.

The song "Time", from David Bowie's 1973 album Aladdin Sane, references Murcia and his untimely demise ("Time/In quaaludes and red wine/Demanding Billy Dolls/And other friends of mine/Take your time").
