= Chris Robison =

American songwriter (1948/49–2021)

- Born: Harold Alton Meyer; Wellesley, Massachusetts
- Died: December 2021 (age 73)
- Years active: 1969–2021
- Labels: Gypsy Frog Records, Chapter Music
- Website: http://www.chrisrobison.net/

Chris Robison was an American musician, songwriter and recording artist. He toured with the New York Dolls, Steam and Elephant's Memory. He died in December 2021, at age 73

== Elephant’s Memory ==
Robison sang back up with Lennon, Yoko Ono and Elephant’s Memory during a 1972 session at New York City’s Record Plant East on the track Baddest of the Mean, which appeared on the album Elephant's Memory, released September 18, 1972. Robison is credited as an author along with Rick Frank and Stan Bronstein on the track Power Boogie, the released version of which featured Lennon on vocals and guitar and Ono on backing vocals. Elephant’s Memory was known for contributing the track Jungle Gym at the Zoo to the Midnight Cowboy soundtrack and for bizarre stage shows with an inflatable stage set and music that incorporated psychedelia, jazz and acid-tinged rock.

== New York Dolls ==
Robison played keyboards with the 1975 lineup of the New York Dolls that included David Johansen, Sylvain Sylvain, Peter Jordan and Tony Machine. He toured with the Dolls during their 1975 tour of Japan with Jeff Beck, performing on the album Tokyo Dolls Live.

== Solo career ==
Robison released two albums in the early 1970s that were among the first to deal with explicitly gay themes.

"Chris Robison and His Many Hand Band" (1973) and "Manchild" (1974), were both released on Gypsy Frog Records. The former has been released on CD by Chapter Music. The style of these albums differed from the glam rock that was in vogue at the time, being much more varied, improvisational and loose. Where glam artists from the time, such as Jobriath, wrapped homosexual themes in a veneer of science fiction and otherworldliness, Robison was much more direct in his approach, with songs such as "Doctor Doctor" and "Looking for a Boy Tonight", both from his first album, dealing with the issue head on.

== Stumblebunny ==
After his release from the New York Dolls, Robison formed Stumblebunny, which premiered at Max's Kansas City in 1977. The band issued a self produced EP and the European label Phonogram signed the band, which toured until the band split up in 1979. Robison reformed the power-pop band in the 2000s, and it played the C2SV Music & Technology festival, headlined by Iggy and the Stooges. in San Jose, California in 2012.

== Personal life ==
Robison taught piano, keyboard, guitar and songwriting for over 30 years & was the founder of Half Mile Music Studios near Coleytown, Connecticut. He has two sons, Dr. Tiger Robison, an assistant professor of music education at the University of Wyoming, and Dexter Scott. Robison died at the age of 73 in December 2021
