= Courageous Cat and Minute Mouse =

American 1960s children's animated TV series

- A&E's DVD release of Courageous Cat and Minute Mouse
- Created by: Bob Kane
- Directed by: Marvin Woodward; Reuben Timmins; Sid Marcus; Amby Paliwoda
- Voices of: Dallas McKennon; Roy Halee; Dayton Allen
- Country of origin: United States
- No. of episodes: 130

Production
- Executive producer: Sam Singer
- Running time: 5 minutes
- Production company: Trans-Artists Productions

Original release
- Network: Syndication
- Release: September 14, 1960 – November 30, 1962

Courageous Cat and Minute Mouse is an American animated television series that was produced by Trans-Artists Productions and syndicated by Tele Features Inc. The characters were originated and created by authors Bob Kane and Gerald J. Rappoport as a parody of Kane's earlier creations, Batman and Robin. In many ways, Courageous Cat and Minute Mouse presages the camp aspects of the later Batman live-action series, which William Dozier and Howie Horwitz produced as a villain-driven action-comedy lampoon. Storyboard design was by Kane's assistant/ghost Sheldon Moldoff.

== Plot ==
In the animated series, the pair are anthropomorphic animal superheroes without known secret identities (the green-eyed caped crimefighter and his squeaky-voiced companion are usually addressed as simply "Courageous" and "Minute") who live in the Cat Cave. When summoned via the Cat Signal over their television set, Courageous Cat and Minute Mouse race to the scene of the crime in their sleekly feline red Cat Mobile which can convert into both the extendable-winged Cat Plane and submersible Cat Boat and thwart the criminal plots of various villains who threaten Empire City. The episodes contained storylines and screenplays and characters written by authors Gerald J. Rappoport and drawings and characters by Bob Kane.

Though they fought many miscreants, the duo's recurring arch-enemy was Chauncey "Flat-Face" Frog who appeared in nearly every episode.

The five-minute length of the cartoons made the series suitable for use as interstitials or airtime fillers, especially to accommodate a movie or show that ended at an unusually early time, as well as animated content for local children's shows. The first episode was broadcast on Wednesday September 14, 1960 as part of "The Tommy Seven Show" by means of channel 7, of which the call letters were WABC-TV of New York City.

== Characters ==
=== Heroes ===
- Courageous Cat – The protector of Empire City. Whenever fighting bad guys, Courageous Cat will use his all-purpose Cat Gun or a vast variety of different deus ex machina "trick guns" he pulls out of his cape (like the Green Arrow's trick arrows) that fire whatever the situation requires, such as a rope, some water, a parachute, cages, boxing gloves, lightning-like magnetic rays, or even more bizarre ammunition, and even the occasional actual bullet. In case of emergency, Courageous also has extra pre-James Bond secret gadgets hidden in his belt buckle and the star emblem on his chest.
- Minute Mouse – Courageous Cat's rodent sidekick.

=== Supporting characters ===
- The Chief – A canine chief of police who calls in the "furry foes of felony" via the Cat Signal.
- Marilyn Mouse – Minute Mouse's movie star girlfriend.
- Sassy Bones – A blonde mouse who is a chanteuse at a nightclub called The Pad with whom Rodney Rodent is enamored.

=== Villains ===
- Chauncey "Flat-Face" Frog – Chauncey is a chortling, cigar-smoking, derby-hatted criminal mastermind whose voice was based on Edward G. Robinson.
  - Harry Gorilla – Chauncey "Flat-Face" Frog's hulking, half-witted henchman.
- Professor Shaggy Dog – A mad scientist with an Albert Einstein-like mop of white hair who is tall, thin, and bewhiskered in some episodes and short and bespectacled in others.
- Big Shot and Little Shot – A burly bulldog (who talks like James Cagney in some episodes) and his short sidekick who are generic gruff gangsters that are Chauncey "Flat-Face" Frog's rivals in crime.
- The Black Cat – A sinister thief. He is a "cat burglar" who is a caricature of Cary Grant.
- Rodney Rodent – A French-accented rat artist gone bad.
- Shoo Shoo Fly – A tiny insect whose small size belies its enormous appetite, its name is a reference to shoofly pie and the tsetse fly.
- Robber Rabbit – A gravel-voiced rabbit thug in a black turtleneck.
- Foxy the Fox – A debonair fox thief in a top hat and tuxedo.
- The Great Hambone – An egotistical canine actor and master of disguise.
- Iron Shark – A fish-shaped submarine.
- Professor Von Noodle Stroudel/Strudel – A German-accented human scientist who is not so much a villain as oblivious to the effects of his experiments on the world around him.
- Comrade and Commissar – Russian-accented, trench coat-clad foreign dog spies whom Courageous and Minute were never able to apprehend due to their "diplomatic immunity" – true Cold War villains.
- The Unmentionables and The Unthinkables – Rival gangs headed by Chauncey "Flat-Face" Frog and Big Shot. Their names are a parody of The Untouchables.
- Outrageous Cat – Courageous Cat's Wild West outlaw-style cousin who talks like Yosemite Sam.
- Screwy Squirrel – A rarely seen criminal who usually appeared as part of a group.
- Tony and Angel – A pair of crooks who steal an invisibility formula so that they can commit crimes without being seen.
- Periscope Pete-A living, breathing periscope with a bush for a body.
- Mad Moe-A clown who intentionally sabotaged a circus in retaliation for being denied a raise. He was shot into orbit from a cannon.
- Professor Owl-An owl scientist who invents a counterfeiting machine, and works in league with Chauncey "Flatface" Frog and Robber Rabbit. He only appeared in "The Case of the Counterfeiters."

== Voice cast ==
- Dallas McKennon – Courageous Cat and Minute Mouse

== Episodes ==
No.	Title	Original release date
1	"Disguise the Limit"	September 14, 1960
The Frog masquerades as Courageous in order to frame his greatest enemy for a crime Courageous did not commit.
2	"Monster from Outer Space"	September 21, 1960
TBA
3	"The Case of the Cousin Outrageous"	September 28, 1960
Courageous has to deal with the antics of his cousin, Outrageous Cat, who speaks in a similar manner to Yosemite Sam.
4	"The Case of the Abandoned Movie Sets"	October 5, 1960
The Frog and Harry use abandoned movie sets for a hideout.
5	"The Case of the Auto Tycoons"	October 12, 1960
Chauncey "Flatface" Frog is stealing cars with help from Foxy Fox, Rodney Rodent, Robber Rabbit, and Screwy Squirrel. Note: The Frog is the only villain arrested in this episode. Also, it is revealed that the Catmobile is sentient enough to recognize Courageous Cat after The Frog converts it into a flying saucer with wheels.
6	"The Case of the Backward Clock"	October 19, 1960
Professor Shaggy Dog tries to run all the clocks backwards.
7	"The Case of the Bank Robbery"	October 26, 1960
TBA
8	"The Case of the Big Ball Game"	November 2, 1960
TBA
9	"The Case of the Big Movie Star"	November 9, 1960
TBA
10	"The Case of the Big Party"	November 16, 1960
TBA
11	"The Case of the Big Pipe Line"	November 30, 1960
The Frog and Harry find the Great Pizano working in the city's sewers, and they plan a heist.
12	"The Case of the Big Prison Break"	December 7, 1960
The Frog switches identities with Courageous by swapping clothes and stealing his car.
13	"The Case of the Big Race"	December 14, 1960
Courageous and Minute race against Rodney Rodent for a $1,000 first prize.
14	"The Case of the Big Squeeze"	January 4, 1961
TBA
15	"The Case of the Big Trial"	January 11, 1961
TBA
16	"The Case of the Blinking Planet"	January 18, 1961
TBA
17	"The Case of the Boxing Champ"	January 25, 1961
The Frog takes over Mike's Gym, and decides to train Harry(called Punchy in this episode) to become a boxing champion. However, Harry/Punchy keeps saying that he likes bananas.
18	"The Case of the Carnival Capers"	February 1, 1961
Robber Rabbit and Screwy cheat Minute Mouse out of his winnings and pickpocket Courageous, leading to a mad chase.
19	"The Case of the Cat Cave Treasure"	February 8, 1961
TBA
20	"The Case of the Construction Caper"	February 15, 1961
After Big Shot robs a construction company, Courageous and Minute pursue him on the job site.
21	"The Case of the Counterfeiters"	February 22, 1961
The Frog creates counterfeit cash that has more content than the real thing.
22	"The Case of the Creatures From Down Under"	March 1, 1961
TBA
23	"The Case of the Crime Kits"	March 8, 1961
TBA
24	"The Case of Crime and Punishment"	March 15, 1961
The Frog recounts his life story on how he always gets back in jail after he gets out.
25	"The Case of the Crime Lab"	March 22, 1961
TBA
26	"The Case of the Diamond Smugglers"	March 29, 1961
TBA
27	"The Case of the Draggy Dragster"	1961
TBA
28	"The Case of the Embassy Stake Out"	1961
TBA
29	"The Case of the Fabulous Diamond"	1961
TBA
30	"The Case of the Flying Eye"	1961
TBA
31	"The Case of the Flying Saucer"	1961
TBA
32	"The Case of the Fortune Teller"	1961
Rodney Rodent gives Courageous and Minute bad advice and turns them against each other.
33	"The Case of the Frogmen"	1961
TBA
34	"The Case of the Fugitive at Large"	1961
TBA
35	"The Case of the Gasoline War"	1961
Big Shot and Little Shot try to open a legitimate business, but the Frog gets the better of them.
36	"The Case of the Golden Statue"	1961
TBA
37	"The Case of the Great Impersonations"	1961
Actor Hamilton Hambone impersonates several ambassadors to prove his talent.
38	"The Case of the Great Circus Mystery"	1961
The Frog causes trouble at a circus.
39	"The Case of the Gun Mix-up"	1961
Minute tries his hand at using Courageous's trick guns, but he consistently uses the wrong gun for the wrong job.
40	"The Case of the Haunted Ship"	1961
TBA
41	"The Case of the Haunted House"	1961
TBA
42	"The Case of the Hawaiian Holiday"	1961
TBA
43	"The Case of the Hermit of Creepy Hollow"	1961
TBA
44	"The Case of the Invisible Robbers"	1961
Courageous and Minute have their hands full when robbers find an invisibility tonic.
45	"The Case of the Iron Shark"	1961
TBA
46	"The Case of the King-Size Caper"	1961
Professor Shaggy Dog manages to turn Courageous and Minute into giants.
47	"The Case of the Mad Cowboys"	1961
TBA
48	"The Case of the Mad Painter"	1961
TBA
49	"The Case of the Mad Scientist"	1961
TBA
50	"The Case of the Magic Wand"	1961
TBA
51	"The Case of the Mail of Train Robbery"	1961
TBA
52	"The Case of the Masked Raiders"	1961
TBA
53	"The Case of the Masked Raiders"	1961
TBA
54	"The Case of the Minced Spies"	1961
TBA
55	"The Case of the Mind Reader"	1961
TBA
56	"The Case of the Missing Masterpiece"	1961
TBA
57	"The Case of the Missing Partner"	1961
Minute Mouse is kidnapped.
58	"The Case of the Monster Vine"	1961
TBA
59	"The Case of the Movie Rays"	1961
Professor Shaggy Dog uses movie projectors to create illusions leading to city-wide panic so that the Frog can rob all the banks and stores unchallenged.
60	"The Case of the Museum"	1961
TBA
61	"The Case of the Mysterious Bottle"	1961
The Frog tricks Courageous and Minute and strands them on an island.
62	"The Case of the Mysterious Submarine"	1961
TBA
63	"The Case of the Mysterious Weather"	1961
TBA
64	"The Case of the Nine Lives"	1961
TBA
65	"The Case of the Northwoods Caper"	1961
Courageous and Minute go after Bully Bulldog when he wreaks havoc in the woods.
66	"The Case of the Opera Singer"	1961
To assist in his capers, The Frog recruits opera singer the Great Pizano.
67	"The Case of the Peace Pipe"	1961
TBA
68	"The Case of the Perfect Alibi"	1961
TBA
69	"The Case of the Professor's Machine"	1961
TBA
70	"The Case of the Rescue Squad"	1961
TBA
71	"The Case of the Robber Rabbit"	1962
Robber Rabbit plays around in a department store after stealing carrots from a street vendor.
72	"The Case of the Robot"	1962
TBA
73	"The Case of the Saggin' Dragon"	1962
A prehistoric monster shows up in Empire City and wreaks havoc.
74	"The Case of the Scheming Cleaners"	1962
TBA
75	"The Case of the Secret Weapon"	1962
TBA
76	"The Case of the Shoo Shoo Fly"	1962
TBA
77	"The Case of the Sleepy Chief"	1962
TBA
78	"The Case of the Sniffer Machine"	1962
TBA
79	"The Case of the Spies' Return"	1962
TBA
80	"The Case of the Stolen Cheese"	1962
Robber Rabbit decides to steal imported cheese, but he fails to count on Minute's strong sense of smell.
81	"The Case of the Stolen Pyramid"	1962
TBA
82	"The Case of the Thinking Cap"	1962
TBA
83	"The Case of the Tin Can Caper"	1962
The Frog uses his mad science to transform valuables into tin cans.
84	"The Case of the Trampoline Performers"	1962
TBA
85	"The Case of the TV Director"	1962
TBA
86	"The Case of the TV Mystery"	1962
TBA
87	"The Case of the Undercover Agents"	1962
TBA
88	"The Case of the Unmentionables"	1962
TBA
89	"The Case of the Unthinkables"	1962
The Frog leads a gang of thugs that set out to steal an armored car with the cash in it.
90	"The Case of the Visiting Patient"	1962
TBA
91	"The Case of the Waterfront Caper"	1962
TBA
92	"The Return of the Shoo Shoo Fly"	November 30, 1962
TBA

== Home video releases ==
A&E Home Video (distributed by New Video) released all 130 five-minute-long episodes on DVD in Region 1 on October 29, 2002.

== International Broadcast ==
Japan

In Japan, it was dubbed into Japanese and first broadcast on NHK General TV under the name "Courageous Cat" from October 6, 1960 to October 1, 1961. It was also one of the first color cartoons on Japanese television.

After its initial broadcast on NHK, the show aired on Nippon Television from July 16, 1964, to November 5, 1964. It aired every Thursday from 18:15 to 18:45. The title was changed to "スーパー・キャット" (Super Cat), and later "突撃キャット君" (Totsugeki Cat-kun)

Voice actors:

Masato Yamanouchi

Kikuko Kinoshita

Kiyoshi Kawakubo

== Music ==
The memorable theme music by Johnny Holiday features a walking bass line and is fashioned after the theme for Peter Gunn. It has most notably been performed in concert by the New York Dolls and their version of the "Courageous Cat Theme" featured on their album Rock'n Roll (1994). The theme was also featured in "Thousand Dollar Bill", a 1959 episode of the Mike Connors detective series Tightrope!. It also appears in "The Jackson Greene Story", a 1959 episode of The Millionaire (TV series). It was also sampled on Jay-Z's first recording "HP Gets Busy" by High Potent (1986), LL Cool J's "I'm Bad" (1987), and Soul Coughing's "Is Chicago, Is Not Chicago" (1994).

In 2019, Brown Bear Records released a cover of the theme by The Gavoons on Brown Bear on TV, a compilation album of covers of television themes.

== Merchandise ==
In 1960, Simon Says Records released a 12" vinyl record entitled COURAGEOUS CAT in the story of “Around the World in a Daze” featuring Dal McKennon and Johhny Holiday performing all the voices. It runs for 24 minutes and is available to listen to on Youtube.

Other items of merchandise from the early 1960s included a Courageous Cat Sliding Squares Puzzle, a Super Slate, a Collegeville Courageous Cat halloween costume including mask, at least two coloring books, and matchbooks.

== Later appearances ==
Reruns of Courageous Cat and Minute Mouse were shown on Nickelodeon's Weinerville in the 1990s along with reruns of Batfink and both segments of The Alvin Show.

In Germany and Austria, the show was called Mirakulus und Supermaus, and was broadcast as part of the German children's television show Bim Bam Bino (1988-98) on Tele 5. Some episodes were released on VHS and DVD.

== Cancelled film ==
In 2012, it was announced that Evergreen Media Group had acquired the rights to produce a live-action/CGI film based on Courageous Cat, but as this has not come about. It is most likely no longer in development.

== Streaming services ==
All episodes are currently available to watch on Amazon Prime in the US, and most are also available on streaming services Tubi, PROClassicTV and Pluto TV.
