= Dancing Backward in High Heels =

Studio album by New York Dolls
- Released: March 15, 2011
- Recorded: September 7–30, 2010
- Studio: Blast Recording
- Genres: Glam punk; rock and roll
- Length: 37:08
- Label: 429 Records
- Producer: Jason Hill

New York Dolls chronology
Cause I Sez So (2009)	Dancing Backward in High Heels (2011)

Professional ratings
Review scores
Source	Rating
The A.V. Club	B−
BBC Music	(mixed)
Chicago Tribune	1.5/4 stars
The Daily Telegraph	4/5 stars
The Independent	1/5 stars
Los Angeles Times	3/4 stars
NME	7/10 stars
PopMatters	8/10 stars
Rolling Stone	3.5/5 stars
Spin	8/10 stars

Dancing Backward in High Heels is the fifth and final studio album by the New York Dolls, and the third since their 2004 reunion. Released on March 15, 2011, on 429 Records, it contains covers of the 1946 Leon René standard "I Sold My Heart to the Junkman," and "Funky But Chic," originally from David Johansen's 1978 self-titled album.

The title is a reference to actress Ginger Rogers. In a 1982 Frank and Ernest cartoon by Bob Thaves (image), a woman is telling Frank and Ernest "Sure (Fred Astaire) was great, but don't forget that Ginger Rogers did everything he did, ...backwards and in high heels."

== Track listing ==
All tracks are written by David Johansen and Sylvain Sylvain, except where noted.

No.	Title	Writer(s)	Length
1.	"Streetcake"		3:18
2.	"Talk to Me Baby"		3:03
3.	"Fabulous Rant"		0:25
4.	"I'm So Fabulous"		2:26
5.	"Fool for You Baby"		2:37
6.	"Kids Like You"		3:51
7.	"Round and Round She Goes"		3:46
8.	"You Don't Have to Cry"	Jason Hill, David Johansen, Sylvain Sylvain	3:03
9.	"I Sold My Heart to the Junkman"	Otis René, Leon René	2:24
10.	"Baby, Tell Me What I'm On"		3:57
11.	"Funky But Chic"		4:01
12.	"End of the Summer"		4:17
Total length:			37:08

== Personnel ==
Dancing Backward in High Heels was produced by Jason Hill, who also replaced Sami Yaffa as Dolls bassist on this album. Also joining Johansen and Sylvain Sylvain – the only members still living at the time of either the New York Dolls' "classic" 1972–1975 line up which recorded their two albums on Mercury Records or the two earlier line ups – were drummer Brian Delaney, who has been with the Dolls since their 2004 reunion, and former Blondie guitarist Frank Infante.

Neither Sylvain nor Johansen released any further albums, solo or in any bands, before their respective deaths in 2021 and 2025, both from cancer. As such, this is the last album ever recorded by any members of the "classic" or earlier line-ups.

New York Dolls

- David Johansen – lead vocals, harmonica
- Sylvain Sylvain – guitar, vocals
- Frank Infante – guitar
- Jason Hill – bass, vocals
- Brian Delaney – drums
