= Down and Out Blues =

Compilation album by Sonny Boy Williamson
- Released: 1959
- Recorded: August 12, 1955 – March 27, 1958 in Chicago
- Genre: Chicago blues
- Length: 31:56
- Label: Checker LP-1437
- Producer: Leonard Chess, Phil Chess, Willie Dixon

Sonny Boy Williamson chronology
| Down and Out Blues (1959) | The Real Folk Blues (1965) |

Professional ratings
Review scores
| Source | Rating |
|---|---|
| Record Mirror | 3/5 stars |

Down and Out Blues is the first LP record by American blues musician Sonny Boy Williamson. The album was released in 1959 by Checker Records (see 1959 in music).

The album was a compilation of Williamson's first singles for Checker, from "Don't Start Me to Talkin'" b/w "All My Love in Vain" through "Dissatisfied" b/w "Cross My Heart".

The album features many famous blues musicians backing Williamson, including Muddy Waters, Otis Spann, and Willie Dixon.

== Recording ==
The first session that Williamson recorded for Checker was on August 12, 1955 where he recorded "Don't Start Me to Talkin'" and "All My Love in Vain", which were released as a single a month later in September. On January 7, 1956 he recorded "Let Me Explain". The single "Keep It to Yourself" b/w "The Key (To Your Door)" was recorded on August 7, 1956. "Fattening Frogs for Snakes" b/w "I Don't Know" was recorded on February 6, 1957 and was released either in late May or early June. "99" was recorded on September 1, 1957 and was released as the B-side of "Born Blind" in late January or early February 1958. The single "Cross My Heart" b/w "Dissatisfied" was recorded at the same session. "Wake Up Baby" b/w "Your Funeral and My Trial" was the last song on Down and Out Blues to be recorded on March 27, 1958.

== Artwork and packaging ==
The album cover features a photograph of a homeless person by Don Bronstein, and the liner notes were written by Studs Terkel, who had written Giants of Jazz.

== Accolades ==
Down and Out Blues was inducted into the Blues Hall of Fame in 2007. In 1988, the album won a W.C. Handy Award for Vintage/Reissue Album (US).

== Track listing ==
All songs written by Sonny Boy Williamson.

Side one

1. "Don't Start Me to Talkin'" – 2:30
2. "I Don't Know" – 2:20
3. "All My Love in Vain" – 2:45
4. "The Key (To Your Door)" – 3:10
5. "Keep It to Yourself" – 2:45
6. "Dissatisfied" – 2:40

Side two

1. "Fattening Frogs for Snakes" – 2:16
2. "Wake Up Baby" – 2:21
3. "Your Funeral and My Trial" – 2:26
4. "99" – 2:35
5. "Cross My Heart" – 3:18
6. "Let Me Explain" – 2:50

== Personnel ==
Per liner notes

- Sonny Boy Williamson – vocals, harmonica
- Muddy Waters – guitar on "Don't Start Me to Talkin'" and "All My Love in Vain"
- Jimmy Rogers – guitar on "Don't Start Me to Talkin'" and "All My Love in Vain"
- Otis Spann – piano
- Willie Dixon – bass
- Fred Below – drums
- Robert Lockwood, Jr. – guitar
- Luther Tucker – guitar
- Lafayette Leake – piano on "Wake Up Baby" and "Your Funeral and My Trial"
- Eugene Pierson – guitar on "Wake Up Baby" and "Your Funeral and My Trial"

== Charts ==
Down and Out Blues peaked at number 20 on the UK Albums Chart in June 1964.

== Release history ==
| Region | Date | Label | Format | Catalog |
|---|---|---|---|---|
| United States | 1959 | Checker Records | mono LP | LP-1437 |
| United States | 1959 | Checker Records | stereo LP | LPS-1437 |
| United Kingdom | 1963 | Pye International Records | LP | NPL 28036 |
| United States | 1990 | MCA Records/Chess Records | CD | CHD-31272 |
| Japan | 2001 | MCA Records | CD | UICY-3207 |
