= Stranded in the Jungle =

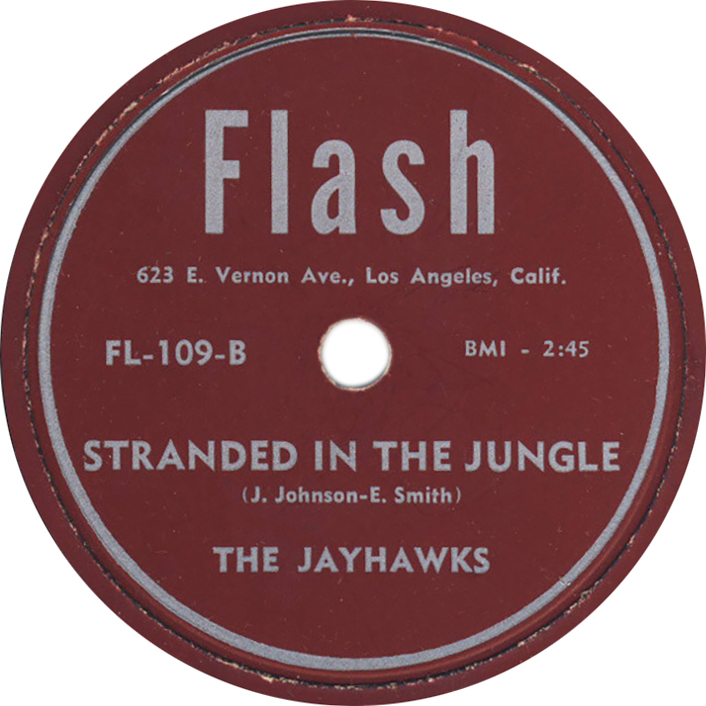

Single by The Jay Hawks
- B-side: "My Only Darling"
- Released: 1956
- Genre: R&B, doo-wop
- Length: 2:45
- Label: Flash Records
- Songwriters: James Johnson, Ernestine Smith

The Jay Hawks singles chronology
"Counting My Teardrops" (1955)	"Stranded in the Jungle" (1956)	"Don't Mind Dyin'" (1956)

"Stranded in the Jungle" is a song originally recorded by the American doo-wop group the Jay Hawks. It was written by Ernestine Smith and the band's first tenor, James Johnson. The Jayhawks' version of the song peaked at No. 18 on the Billboard Magazine Best Selling Popular Retail Records Chart.

== Cover versions ==
The American doo wop group, The Cadets, were the first to cover the Jay Hawks' hit, with the Gadabouts not far behind. All three groups proved to be one-hit wonders, with "Stranded in the Jungle" being the only top-40 hit for any of them, although The Jay Hawks had other hits under the names The Vibrations and The Marathons. The Rhythm Rockets and the Johnston Brothers (B-side to "In the Middle of the House" by the Johnston Brothers and the Keynotes) also covered it in 1956.

== Cadets version ==
The Cadets' "Stranded in the Jungle" is likely the best known version. It sat at No. 16 on the Best Selling Popular Retail Records Chart the same week the Jay Hawks' version reached No. 18 (18 July 1956). A week later, it peaked at No. 15 on the sales chart and at No. 3 on the U.S. Rhythm and Blues chart (the Gadabouts peaked at No. 39 on the pop chart one week later). The Cadets version features spoken verses by Will "Dub" Jones (who would go on to sing bass on most of The Coasters' hits) with a duet refrain by Willie Davis and Aaron Collins. It was after the second verse that Prentice Moreland delivers the line, "Great Googa Mooga! Lemme outta here!"

== Later versions ==
A variation of "Stranded in the Jungle" was recorded by Betty Reilly as "The Saga Of Elvis Presley" on her 1957 RKO album Caught In The Act. Her version incorporated part of "Heartbreak Hotel" at the finish.

The next version of "Stranded in the Jungle" came in 1965 as the B-side of the Fearsome Foursome's "Fly in the Buttermilk" single. Shorty Long followed in 1968, and Jett Powers followed in 1970.

"Stranded in the Jungle" was covered by the New York Dolls on their 1974 album Too Much Too Soon, and released as its lead single. It was also included on their 1994 compilation album, Rock'n Roll. A biography on the life of their drummer Jerry Nolan by Curt Weiss is entitled Stranded in the Jungle. Dolls lead singer David Johansen included a live version of it on his 1982 album, Live It Up.

Other bands to make versions of "Stranded in the Jungle" include Crazy Joe and the Variable Speed Band (1981), the Mighty Flyers (1984), Big Dipper (1990), The Nylons (1996), and Commander Cody and His Lost Planet Airmen (2007). In 1998 the Los Angeles-based punk-rock combo Voodoo Glow Skulls covered the song but with a much faster and harder tempo. It was covered by Frank Zappa during the North American leg of his 1976 tour, and released posthumously in 2009 on the album Philly '76. Gene Summers released a cover version of the song on his album Taboo! released in 2011.

In 2003, Adam Ant embarked upon an ill-fated attempt to raise awareness of the plight of the endangered mountain gorilla in Central Africa by reworking "Stand and Deliver" into "Save the Gorilla." "Save the Gorilla" was part of a five track EP of jungle themed songs, "Stranded in the Jungle" included, set for release on 17 November 2003. "Stand and Deliver" co-writer Marco Pirroni and EMI Records blocked its release just days before its intended release, and it never saw the light of day.
