= Don't Start Me Talkin' =

Single by Sonny Boy Williamson II
- B-side: "All My Love in Vain"
- Released: September 1955
- Recorded: Chicago, Illinois, United States, August 12, 1955
- Genre: Chicago blues
- Length: 2:36
- Label: Checker (no. 824)
- Songwriter: Sonny Boy Williamson
- Producers: Leonard Chess, Phil Chess, Willie Dixon

Sonny Boy Williamson II singles chronology
"Boppin' with Sonny" (1955)	"Don't Start Me Talkin'" (1955)	"Let Me Explain" (1956)

"Don't Start Me Talkin'" (also called "Don't Start Me to Talkin'") is a blues song written and performed by Sonny Boy Williamson II. It was Williamson's first single recorded for Checker Records, and reached number three in the US Billboard R&B chart in 1955.

== Recording background ==
After Trumpet Records folded, on August 12, 1955, Sonny Boy Williamson II had his first recording session for Checker Records. "Don't Start Me Talkin'" was recorded at these sessions. Backing Williamson (vocals and harmonica) were Otis Spann on piano, Muddy Waters and Jimmy Rogers on guitar, Willie Dixon on bass, and Fred Below on drums.

== Release and chart performance ==
"Don't Start Me Talkin'" was released as a single in September 1955, a month after its recording. The song reached number three on Billboard magazine's R&B Singles chart.

== Other releases ==
Both sides of the single appeared on Williamson's 1959 debut album, Down and Out Blues, which was inducted into the Blues Hall of Fame in 2007.

== Other renditions ==
James Cotton, who was taught the harmonica by Williamson, recorded "Don't Start Me Talkin'", for the 1967 album, The James Cotton Blues Band. The New York Dolls recorded it for their second studio album, Too Much Too Soon. Bob Dylan performed the song on Late Night with David Letterman in 1984. Other music artists that have recorded the song include John Hammond, Jr., the Doobie Brothers, Dion, the Yardbirds, Led Zeppelin, Climax Blues Band, Champion Jack Dupree, Rory Gallagher, Willie "Big Eyes" Smith, Fenton Robinson, Good Rockin' Charles and Gary Moore, among others.
