= Sylvain Sylvain (album) =

Studio album by Sylvain Sylvain
- Released: January 1980
- Genre: Rock and roll
- Label: RCA

Sylvain Sylvain chronology
Sylvain Sylvain (1980)	Syl Sylvain and the Teardrops (1981)

Sylvain Sylvain is the debut album by the American musician Sylvain Sylvain, released in January 1980. It peaked at No. 123 on the Billboard 200. He supported the album with a North American tour.

== Production ==
Sylvain was backed by his band, Teenage News, which included members of David Johansen's band. Many of the songs are about being a teenager and the life-changing intensity of rock and roll. "Ain't Got No Home" is a cover of the Clarence "Frogman" Henry song. "Without You" lifts a musical passage from Simon & Garfunkel's "Homeward Bound". "Tonight" is an instrumental.

== Critical reception ==
Professional ratings
Review scores
Source	Rating
AllMusic	3.5/5 stars
Chicago Sun-Times	2.5/4 stars
Robert Christgau	C
The Encyclopedia of Popular Music	3/5 stars
The Muncie Star	C+
The New Rolling Stone Record Guide	4/5 stars

The Boston Globe noted that Sylvain "borrows totally from country music and '50s and '60s pop, yielding a sound so worn and tattered that it's erroneous to palm this off as new music." The Los Angeles Times said, "This salute to Sylvain's early rock and R&B favorites is pleasantly unpretentious, but it's also slim." The Citizen opined that "it's Chuck Berry roots filtered through the Beatles and bubbling over like Sylvain and the boys just discovered rock 'n' roll on a street corner last week." The Commercial Appeal called the album "a fine record of rock and roll that walks snappily and coolly." The Muncie Star opined that Sylvain "is a better arranger than writer or singer." Robert Christgau thought that "Teenage News" and ""What's That Got to Do with Rock 'n' Roll?" were the only worthwhile songs.

== Track listing ==
Side A

1. "Teenage News"
2. "What's That Got to Do with Rock 'n' Roll?"
3. "I'm So Sorry"
4. "Emily"
5. "Without You"

Side B

1. "Every Boy and Every Girl"
2. "14th Street Beat"
3. "Deeper and Deeper"
4. "Ain't Got No Home"
5. "Tonight"
