= Too Much Too Soon (album) =

Studio album by New York Dolls
- Released: May 10, 1974
- Recorded: January–February 1974
- Studio: A&R (New York)
- Genres: Hard rock; proto-punk; glam rock; punk rock
- Length: 36:44
- Label: Mercury
- Producer: Shadow Morton

New York Dolls chronology
New York Dolls (1973)	Too Much Too Soon (1974)	Lipstick Killers (1981)

Singles from Too Much Too Soon
- 1. "Stranded in the Jungle" / "Who Are the Mystery Girls?" Released: July 1974; 2. "(There's Gonna Be A) Showdown" / "Puss 'n' Boots" Released: September 1974

Too Much Too Soon is the second album by the American rock band New York Dolls. It was released by Mercury Records on May 10, 1974, and recorded earlier that year at A&R Studios in New York City. Dissatisfied with the recording of their 1973 self-titled debut album, the Dolls' lead singer David Johansen enlisted veteran producer Shadow Morton to produce the sessions. Morton, who had been disenchanted by the music industry, found renewed motivation in the band's energy and undertook the project as a challenge.

Although the Dolls shared an affinity for Morton, they produced little original material with him. To complete Too Much Too Soon, they covered older songs and re-recorded their past demos. Johansen impersonated different characters while singing some of the novelty covers, and Morton incorporated many studio sound effects and female backing vocals in his production. For the album, lead guitarist Johnny Thunders wrote and recorded "Chatterbox", his first released performance singing lead.

Too Much Too Soon sold poorly and only charted at number 167 on the Billboard Top LPs & Tape and number 98 on the Cash Box Top 100 Albums. After a problem-ridden national tour, the New York Dolls were dropped by Mercury and disbanded a few years later. The album received positive reviews from most critics, some of whom felt Morton's production highlighted the group's raw sound and made it a better record than their first. Like their debut album, Too Much Too Soon became one of the most popular cult records in rock music and has since been viewed by music journalists as a precursor to punk rock.

== Background ==
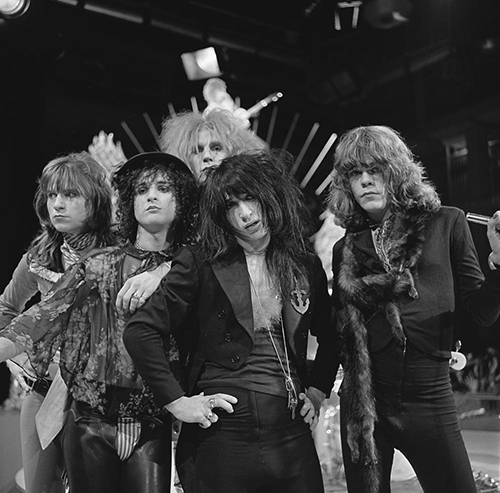
The New York Dolls in 1973

After being signed by Mercury Records, the New York Dolls released their self-titled debut album in 1973 to poor sales. Although it was praised by critics, the band was not satisfied with producer Todd Rundgren's sound for the album and had disagreements with him before choosing not to retain him. Songwriting and production partners Jerry Leiber and Mike Stoller were originally enlisted to produce their next album, while the band's guitarist Johnny Thunders wanted to produce it himself. However, Leiber and Stoller withdrew shortly before recording was to begin. The group held a single session with Mercury A&R executive Paul Nelson at Mediasound Studios in New York City, where they recorded 14 songs, most of which were covers.

At Leiber and Stoller's recommendation, frontman David Johansen asked veteran producer Shadow Morton to work on the album. Morton was best known for his work with the Shangri-Las, of whom the New York Dolls were fans, and had also been Johansen's first choice to produce their debut album. Morton had become disenchanted with the music industry and wanted to challenge himself by producing the band's second album: "The Dolls had energy, sort of a disciplined weirdness. I took them into the room as a challenge. I was bored with the music and the business. The Dolls can certainly snap you out of boredom."

== Recording and production ==
With Morton, the New York Dolls recorded Too Much Too Soon in 1974 at A&R Studios in New York City. The album was later mastered at Sterling Sound and Masterdisk. During the sessions, Morton had Johansen record his vocals several times and incorporated sound effects such as gongs, gunshots, and feminine choruses. In a report on the album's progress for Melody Maker, journalist Lenny Kaye wrote that they were taking more time than they had on their first record, "bringing in occasional strings and horns, following Shadow's advice not 'to settle'." Morton and the band shared an affinity for each other, as he found the group's energy in the studio refreshing, while Johansen was fond of Morton and the "looser" feel he provided for their music. "That man is completely unpretentious", Johansen said of the producer. "He doesn't think he ever did a marvellous thing in his life."

We were pushing it. We were running twenty-six hours each day. They had an incredible amount of energy. God, I remember the scenes in the studio ... the word intense is not intense enough! I let them do what they naturally did and merely tried to catch some of it on tape.

— Shadow Morton

The New York Dolls and Morton produced little original material together. To complete the album, they had to record cover songs and re-record some of the band's earlier demos; "Babylon", "Who Are the Mystery Girls?", "It's Too Late" and "Human Being" had been recorded by the band in March 1973 as demos for Mercury before the label signed them. They had also recorded demos of two songs written by guitarist Sylvain Sylvain, "Teenage News" and "Too Much Too Soon", before working with Morton, but neither was considered for the album. Sylvain said he confronted Morton about this decision, recalling he had been in a rush: "He was too quick with me and said that he'd been told only to listen to David Johansen and Johnny Thunders. He didn't want to tell me who had told him that but obviously it was the managers. I just walked out, it was all driving me nuts."

According to journalist Tony Fletcher, Morton would have been more productive on Too Much Too Soon had it not been for his alcoholism and the lifestyles of the band members—bassist Arthur Kane was also an alcoholic, while Thunders and drummer Jerry Nolan had heroin addictions. Robert Christgau believed the New York Dolls relied more on cover songs for the album because, "like so many cocky songwriters, David Johansen overloaded his debut with originals and then found that record promotion wasn't a life activity that inspired new ones." English writer Clinton Heylin said their inability to sell enough records before may have discouraged them from writing original songs.

== Music and lyrics ==
According to Billboard magazine, Too Much Too Soon is another hard rock record by the New York Dolls but with more "sophisticated" production. Music journalist Nina Antonia wrote that because of the group's "untamable wildness", the record still sounds eccentric despite Morton's attempts to "polish" their sound, such as by subduing their otherwise unrefined guitar playing. The album features covers of the Cadets' 1956 hit "Stranded in the Jungle", Archie Bell's 1969 hit "There's Gonna Be a Showdown", and Sonny Boy Williamson's "Don't Start Me Talkin'". On the novelty cover songs, Johansen impersonates characters such as the high-stepper in "(There's Gonna Be A) Showdown" and Charlie Chan in "Bad Detective", which has lyrics describing a nonsensical narrative set in China. On "Stranded in the Jungle", he alternates between a comical reject and a lecherous man at lover's lane. Journalist Ellen Willis remarked that, like the band's 1973 song "Personality Crisis", "Stranded in the Jungle" suggests a theme of "clashing cultures and the dilemma of preserving one's uniqueness while reaching out to others".

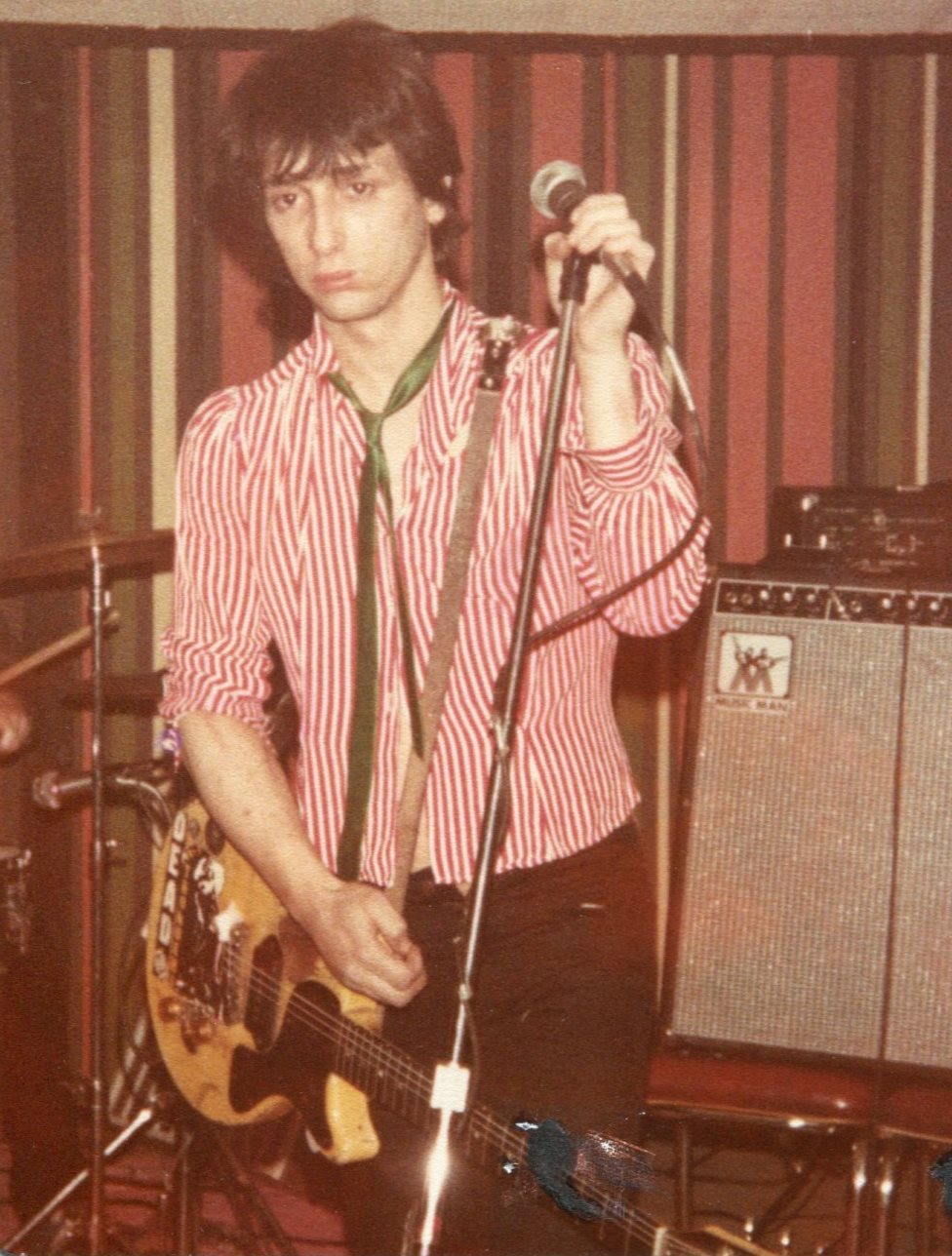
"Chatterbox" was written and sung by lead guitarist Johnny Thunders (pictured in 1979).

For "Babylon", Johansen wrote the lyrics as a tribute to the New York Dolls' following from outside New York City: "[The song] is about people who live in Babylon, Long Island, New York, who go into the city every night dressed to kill. These people have to get home before sun-up, you know, like vampires that can't get caught by the sun." By contrast, Spin magazine's Eric Weisbard and Craig Marks interpreted "Babylon" as a reference to the Biblical city of the same name because of how the song portrays "the symbol of decadence as a sanctuary". The song's subject leaves Babylon for Manhattan, where she is then hired to work in a massage parlor.

"It's Too Late" is a commentary on nostalgic fashions and makes reference to actress Diana Dors in a lyric rebuking drug use. According to Antonia, the song criticizes indifferent, decadent people who cannot, as Johansen sings, "parlez New York français". On "Who Are the Mystery Girls?", he scolds those who abuse love, wanting to "kick it on the floor" and "beat it like a scatter rug". "Puss 'n' Boots" is titled after an illustrated, podo-erotic magazine sold in adult book stores. Johansen said the song is about shoe fetishism, "or as Arthur [Kane] observed, it's about 'the woofers in relationship with the woofee'." Its lyrics depict adversities faced by the protagonist, "Little Rhinestone Target", as he tries to change his name in pursuit of his shoe fetish, before the music ends with a gunshot, a sound effect inspired by the Olympics' 1958 song "Western Movies". Willis interpreted a feminist subtext in the song, citing the lyrics "sometimes you gotta get away someway / and now you're walkin' just like you're ten feet tall ... I hope you don't get shot for tryin'."

"Chatterbox" is written and sung by Thunders, whom Willis felt "uses his voice as a wailing instrument" in a manner similar to rock singer Robert Plant. The song is Thunders's first time singing lead and features vocals Weisbard and Marks said are delivered in a quavering but proud New York accent. His lyrics describe the narrator's growing frustration over a crossed-wire phone connection with a female subject. On "Human Being", an ode to self-respect and personal liberty, Thunders introduces his guitar playing with a roughly performed variation on Bill Doggett's 1956 song "Honky Tonk". Johansen addresses critics of the band in the song, telling them if they find him objectionable they should instead find themselves "a saint", "a boy who's gonna be what I ain't", and a "plastic doll with a fresh coat of paint who's gonna sit through the madness and always act so quaint".

== Marketing and sales ==
Too Much Too Soon was titled after the biography on actress Diana Barrymore. According to music journalist Jon Savage, the title was "more than applicable to the Dolls themselves" because of alcoholism and other issues among the band members, including Thunders's heroin use and Nolan's contraction of hepatitis. A dedication to Barrymore was printed in the album's gatefold. For its front cover, the group eschewed the drag image that their first album had presented, and that they had developed a reputation for, in favor of a fake concert shot. During the shoot, Thunders held a doll in his arm as if to strike it against his guitar to add shock value.

"Stranded in the Jungle"
"Stranded in the Jungle" was released as a single; Morton's slick production reflected the band's attempt to achieve more commercial success.

The album was first released on May 10, 1974, in the United States. Two double A-sided, 7" singles were released to promote the album—"Stranded in the Jungle" / "Who Are the Mystery Girls?" in July and "(There's Gonna Be A) Showdown" / "Puss 'n' Boots" in September 1974—but neither charted. According to Antonia, the selected singles demonstrated how "the Dolls were in need of a hit single and their current producer wanted to see them attain it" by accommodating radio audiences with toned-down studio versions of songs the band had performed more rowdily in concert. "Stranded in the Jungle", originally a rowdy concert staple for the band, had been produced by Morton with a more polished sound and feminine vocals; according to popular music academic Nick Talevski, it became the New York Dolls' most successful single.

Too Much Too Soon was another commercial failure for the New York Dolls, however, as it only charted at number 167 on the Billboard Top LPs & Tape and number 98 on the Cash Box Top 100 Albums. It performed well below Mercury's expectations and sold less than 100,000 copies. Joe Gross later wrote in The New Rolling Stone Album Guide (2004) that the band's attempt to garner more airplay by enlisting Morton did not work because, "with a slicker sound, background choruses, and cleaner riffs, the Dolls just sounded skankier".

When the album was released in Europe in July, the New York Dolls performed at the Buxton Festival in Derbyshire and the Rock Prom Festival at Olympia in London. They also embarked on their second tour of the United States, which lasted only a few months. It was marred by cancelled shows and conflicts between the band members stemming from their escalating addictions to alcohol and other drugs. Because of their alcoholism, they failed to set up a recording session for a scheduled third album after the tour had ended, and by 1975, they were dropped by Mercury before disbanding a few years later.

== Critical reception and legacy ==
Too Much Too Soon received positive reviews from contemporary critics. Reviewing for Rolling Stone in June 1974, Dave Marsh hailed the New York Dolls as the leading hard rock band in the US and noted what he felt was Nolan's competent drumming, Johansen's ability to add depth to his characters, and Thunders's innovative guitar playing. Marsh especially praised his playing on "Chatterbox", calling it "a classic", and believed even the most brazen songs sounded successful because Morton's production highlighted the group's more unrefined musical qualities. Writing for Creem magazine, Christgau said the polished sound reproduction preserved the band's raw qualities, especially in the case of Johansen's vocals and Nolan's drumming, and remarked that Rundgren "should be ashamed—Shadow Morton has gotten more out of the Dolls than they can give us live on any but their best nights." Robert Hilburn from the Los Angeles Times felt Too Much Too Soon was a better-produced album that proved the band to be "the real thing", calling it the best record of derisive punk rock since Exile on Main St. by the Rolling Stones in 1972. In The New Yorker, Ellen Willis wrote that she learned to appreciate Too Much Too Soon more than New York Dolls after seeing the band perform songs from the former album in concert, particularly "Human Being" and "Puss 'n' Boots", while Ron Ross from Phonograph Record magazine said the group's "easy going ironic sensibility" was expressed "far more amusingly and accessibly" here than on their debut album. Tom Hull, in a review published in Overdose, gave the album an A-minus and said that rationalizing one's love of the Dolls "misses the point". Along with being "cute", they are "just about the best really hard rock band around, and in an age of cleverness and chic that's mighty good to see", Hull concluded.

Some reviewers were critical of Too Much Too Soon for what they felt was a poorly recorded and overproduced sound. In a negative review for NME, Nick Kent said it sounded cluttered and "shot through with unfulfilled potential", while Circus magazine panned the record as "cut after cut of annoying screeching". It was nonetheless voted the tenth best album of 1974 in the Pazz & Jop, an annual poll of American critics nationwide, published in The Village Voice. Willis, one of the critics polled, listed it as her fifth favorite record of the year. Christgau, the poll's creator and supervisor, named it third best.

=== Impact and reappraisal ===
Retrospective professional reviews
Review scores
Source	Rating
AllMusic	5/5 stars
Blender	5/5 stars
Chicago Sun-Times	3/4 stars
Christgau's Record Guide	A+
Encyclopedia of Popular Music	3/5 stars
The Great Rock Discography	7/10
MusicHound Rock	3/5
The New Rolling Stone Album Guide	4.5/5 stars
Spin Alternative Record Guide	9/10
Tom Hull – on the Web	A

Along with the New York Dolls' first album, Too Much Too Soon became one of the most popular cult records in rock music. According to AllMusic senior editor Stephen Thomas Erlewine, the group predated punk rock with their "gleeful sleaziness and reckless sound" on the record, which he said was embellished by Morton's production details and exemplified by "musically visceral and dangerous" songs such as "Human Being". Music critic Chuck Eddy contends that a wide array of artists, including Cyndi Lauper and Celtic Frost, have "something rooted here", adding that Johansen's "rape-and-pillage of rock 'n' roll's past" foresaw the postmodern "scavenger-hunting" of the Cramps, Beastie Boys and David Lee Roth.

At the end of the 1970s, Too Much Too Soon appeared on decade-end favorite albums lists by Christgau, who ranked it fourth in the Voice, and Richard Cromelin, who wrote in the Los Angeles Times that Morton's production made it slightly better than New York Dolls. In 1985, Sounds magazine ranked it sixtieth on its list of the 100 best albums of all time. After it was reissued by Mercury in 1987, Don McLeese of the Chicago Sun-Times wrote that Morton's production highlighted the New York Dolls' sense of humor and was rendered vividly by the CD remaster. However, he felt Too Much Too Soon was marred by inconsistent material and rated it lower than their first record. In a review of the reissue, Don Waller of the Los Angeles Times said the album was underappreciated and as much an "instant classic" as New York Dolls.

In 2005, Too Much Too Soon was remastered and reissued by Hip-O Select and Mercury, after which Christgau wrote in Blender that both it and New York Dolls make up "a priceless proto-punk legacy". He wrote that although Johansen's best original songs are on the first record, Too Much Too Soon has consistent hooks, clever lyrics, and exceptional cover songs, including "two R&B novelties whose theatrical potential was barely noticed until the Dolls penetrated their holy essence". That same year, rock journalist Toby Creswell named "Babylon" as one of the greatest songs of all time in his book 1001 Songs. In the Encyclopedia of Popular Music (2006), Colin Larkin felt that the band's issues with alcohol and other drugs affected their performance on the record, which he deemed "a charismatic collection of punk/glam-rock anthems, typically delivered with 'wasted' cool".

== Track listing ==
Side one
No.	Title	Writer(s)	Length
1.	"Babylon"	David Johansen, Johnny Thunders	3:31
2.	"Stranded in the Jungle"	James Johnson, Ernestine Smith	3:46
3.	"Who Are the Mystery Girls?"	Johansen, Thunders	3:08
4.	"(There's Gonna Be A) Showdown"	Kenny Gamble, Leon Huff	3:38
5.	"It's Too Late"	Johansen, Thunders	4:40

Side two
No.	Title	Writer(s)	Length
1.	"Puss 'n' Boots"	Johansen, Sylvain Sylvain	3:06
2.	"Chatterbox"	Thunders	2:25
3.	"Bad Detective" (The Coasters cover)	Keni St. Lewis	3:39
4.	"Don't Start Me Talkin'"	Sonny Boy Williamson II	3:13
5.	"Human Being"	Johansen, Thunders	5:45

== Personnel ==
Credits are adapted from the album's liner notes.

New York Dolls

- David Johansen – vocals, harmonica, gong
- Arthur "Killer" Kane – bass
- Jerry Nolan – drums, percussion
- Sylvain Sylvain – guitar, piano, vocals
- Johnny Thunders – guitar, vocals

Additional personnel

- Album Graphics – graphic supervision
- Dennis Druzbik – engineering
- Bob Gruen – photography
- Gilbert Kong – mastering
- Hans G. Lehmann – photography
- Pieter Mazel – photography
- Shadow Morton – production
- Dixon Van Winkle – engineering

== Release history ==
Information is adapted from Nina Antonia's Too Much Too Soon: The New York Dolls (2006).

Year	Region	Format	Catalog
1974	Australia	LP	6338 498 1
1974	France	LP	9 100 002
1974	Japan	LP	RJ-5135
1974	Netherlands	LP	6 463 064
1974	Spain	LP	63 38 498
1974	United Kingdom	LP	6 338 498
1974	United States	8-track tape	MC-8-1-1001
1974	United States	cassette	MCR-4-1-1001
1974	United States	LP	SRM-1-1001
1977	United Kingdom	double LP*	6641631
1986	United Kingdom	cassette*	PRIDC 12
1986	United Kingdom	double LP*	PRID 12
1986	Australia	LP	6 463 029
1987	Japan	CD*	33PD-422
1987	United States	CD	834 230-2
1989	Japan	CD	23PD111
1991	Japan	CD	PHCR-6044
1994	Japan	CD	PHCR-4241
2005	United States	CD	B00005027-02
(*) packaged with New York Dolls (1973).

== See also ==
- Lipstick Killers – The Mercer Street Sessions 1972 (album featuring demos re-recorded for Too Much Too Soon)
- Timeline of punk rock (list of records such as Too Much Too Soon and events important in punk rock)

== Bibliography ==
- Anon. (1974a). "Top Album Picks". Billboard. No. May 11. New York – via Google Books.
- Anon. (1974b). "Inside Track". Billboard. No. July 13. New York – via Google Books.
- Anon. (1974c). Too Much Too Soon (LP gatefold). New York Dolls. Mercury Records. SRM-1-1001.
- Anon. (1975). "The 1974 Pazz & Jop Critics Poll". The Village Voice. No. January 20. New York.
- Anon. (2005). Too Much Too Soon (CD liner notes). New York Dolls. Hip-O Select. Mercury Records. B00005027-02.
- Anon.(b) (n.d.). "New York Dolls - Too Much Too Soon". Amazon. Archived from the original on July 21, 2015.
- Antonia, Nina (2006). Too Much Too Soon: The New York Dolls (3rd ed.). London: Omnibus Press. ISBN 1-84449-984-7.
- Christgau, Robert (1974). "The Christgau Consumer Guide". Creem (August). Birmingham.
- Christgau, Robert (1975). "Pazz & Jop 1974: Dean's List". The Village Voice. No. January 20. New York.
- Christgau, Robert (1979). "Decade Personal Best: '70s". The Village Voice. No. December 17. New York.
- Christgau, Robert (1981). "Consumer Guide '70s: N". Christgau's Record Guide: Rock Albums of the Seventies. New Haven: Ticknor & Fields. ISBN 0-89919-025-1 – via robertchristgau.com.
- Christgau, Robert (1998). Grown Up All Wrong: 75 Great Rock and Pop Artists from Vaudeville to Techno. Cambridge: Harvard University Press. ISBN 0-674-44318-7.
- Christgau, Robert (2005). "New York Dolls: 'Too Much Too Soon'". Blender (October). New York.
- Creswell, Toby (2005). 1001 Songs: The Great Songs of All Time and the Artists, Stories, and Secrets Behind Them. Melbourne: Hardie Grant Books. ISBN 1-74066-331-4.
- Cromelin, Richard (1979). "'70s LPs: The Ones That Got Away". Los Angeles Times. No. December 30. Calendar section. (subscription required)
- Eddy, Chuck (1991). Stairway to Hell: The 500 Best Heavy Metal Albums in the Universe. New York City, NY: Harmony Books. ISBN 0-517-57541-8.
- Erlewine, Stephen Thomas(a) (n.d.). "New York Dolls: Biography". AllMusic. Archived from the original on September 10, 2013.
- Erlewine, Stephen Thomas(b) (n.d.). "Too Much Too Soon – New York Dolls". AllMusic. Archived from the original on October 19, 2013.
- Fletcher, Tony (2009). All Hopped Up and Ready to Go: Music from the Streets of New York 1927–77. New York: W. W. Norton & Company. ISBN 978-0-393-33483-8.
- Gimarc, George (2005). Punk Diary: The Ultimate Trainspotter's Guide To Underground Rock, 1970–1982. Milwaukee: Hal Leonard Corporation. ISBN 0-87930-848-6.
- Gross, Joe (2004). "New York Dolls". In Brackett, Nathan; Hoard, Christian (eds.). The New Rolling Stone Album Guide (4th ed.). New York: Simon & Schuster. ISBN 0-7432-0169-8.
- Hermes, Will (2012). Love Goes to Buildings on Fire: Five Years in New York That Changed Music Forever. New York: Macmillan. ISBN 978-0-374-53354-0.
- Heylin, Clinton (2005). From the Velvets to the Voidoids: The Birth of American Punk Rock. Chicago Review Press. ISBN 1-55652-575-3.
- Hilburn, Robert (1974). "Touch of Stones in Dolls' Album". Los Angeles Times. No. May 7. (subscription required)
- Hull, Tom (April 1975). "The Rekord Report: Second Card". Overdose – via tomhull.com.
- Hull, Tom (n.d.). "Grade List: New York Dolls". Tom Hull – on the Web.
- Kent, Nick (2007). The Dark Stuff: Selected Writings on Rock Music. London: Faber & Faber. ISBN 978-0-306-81182-1.
- Knowles, Christopher (2010). The Secret History of Rock 'n' Roll. New York: Viva Editions. ISBN 978-1-57344-405-7.
- Lake, Kirk (2003). "The New York Dolls". In Buckley, Peter (ed.). The Rough Guide to Rock. London: Rough Guides. ISBN 1-85828-457-0.
- Larkin, Colin (2006). Encyclopedia of Popular Music (4th ed.). Oxford University Press. ISBN 0-19-531373-9.
- Leszczak, Bob (2014). Encyclopedia of Pop Music Aliases, 1950–2000. Lanham: Rowman & Littlefield. ISBN 978-1-4422-4008-7.
- Marsh, Dave (1974). "Too Much Too Soon". Rolling Stone. No. June 24. New York. Archived from the original on April 13, 2014.
- McLeese, Don (1988). "Koko Isn't Singing Blues Over Injuries". Chicago Sun-Times. No. March 28. (subscription required)
- Pilchak, Angela (2005). Contemporary Musicians: Profiles of the People in Music. Vol. 51. Gale. ISBN 1-4144-0554-5.
- Savage, Jon (2002). England's Dreaming, Revised Edition: Anarchy, Sex Pistols, Punk Rock, and Beyond (revised ed.). New York: Macmillan. ISBN 0-312-28822-0.
- Strong, Martin Charles (2004). "New York Dolls". The Great Rock Discography (7th ed.). Canongate U.S. ISBN 1841956155.
- Talevski, Nick (2010). Rock Obituaries – Knocking On Heaven's Door. London: Omnibus Press. ISBN 978-0-85712-117-2.
- Waller, Don (1986). "When the N.Y. Dolls Rocked". Los Angeles Times. No. March 16. Calendar section. (subscription required)
- Weisbard, Eric; Marks, Craig (1995). Spin Alternative Record Guide. New York: Vintage Books. ISBN 0-679-75574-8.
- Wicks, Todd (1996). "New York Dolls". In Graff, Gary (ed.). MusicHound Rock: The Essential Album Guide. Visible Ink Press. ISBN 0787610372.
- Willis, Ellen (1974). "Rock, Etc". The New Yorker. Vol. 50, no. May 20.
- Willis, Ellen (2011). Out of the Vinyl Deeps: Ellen Willis on Rock Music. University of Minnesota Press. ISBN 978-0-8166-7282-0.
