= Sylvain Sylvain =

American guitarist (1951–2021)

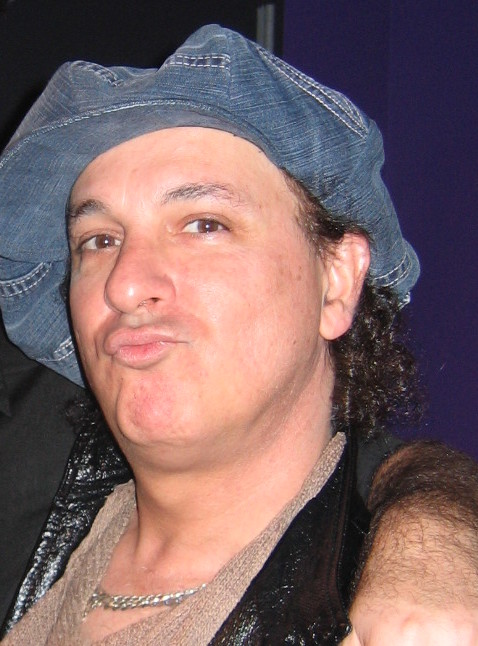
- Sylvain in 2005

Background information
- Born: Sylvain Mizrahi; February 14, 1951; Cairo, Egypt
- Origin: New York City, U.S.
- Died: January 13, 2021 (aged 69) Nashville, Tennessee, U.S.
- Genres: Glam rock; protopunk; punk rock; glam punk
- Occupation: Musician
- Instruments: Guitar; vocals; piano
- Years active: 1971–2021
- Formerly of: New York Dolls; The Criminals

Sylvain Mizrahi (February 14, 1951 – January 13, 2021), known professionally as Sylvain Sylvain, was an American rock guitarist, most notable for being a member of the New York Dolls.

== Early years ==
Sylvain was born in Cairo, Egypt, to a Syrian Jewish family. Sylvain's maternal side was Syrian and originated from Aleppo. Sylvain's paternal side were Sephardic Jews and from Izmir. The family fled in the 1950s due to the Suez Crisis, first to France in 1958 and later the United States.

While in France, Sylvain attended school at Lycee Francais du Cairo. Later, the family moved to the United States. They lived on Lafayette Avenue in Buffalo, New York, and moved to the New York City neighborhood of Rego Park, Queens, while he was still a child. Sylvain had dyslexia. He attended Newtown High School in Queens and Quintano's School for Young Professionals in Manhattan.

Prior to joining the New York Dolls, Sylvain and future New York Doll bandmate Billy Murcia ran a clothing company called Truth and Soul, which helped define his fashion sense and would play a role in the band's groundbreaking look. He had one brother, Leon (deceased), and one sister, Brigitte.

== Career ==
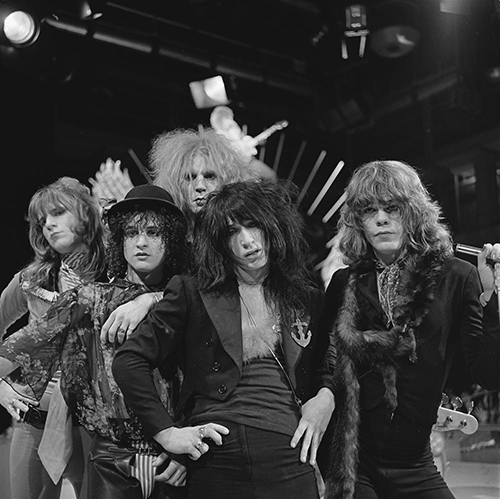
Sylvain Sylvain (second from left) and the New York Dolls on TopPop television program, 1973

Before joining the New York Dolls in 1971, Sylvain was a member of the band Actress, which also featured Arthur Kane, Johnny Thunders and former fashion partner Billy Murcia. He played rhythm guitar for the Dolls from 1971 until the group's dissolution in 1977. Sylvain and singer David Johansen were the last remaining members at the time the group broke up for the final time. After the first dissolution of the Dolls, he frequently played with Johansen on some of his solo records. He started his own band, The Criminal$, with another ex-Doll, Tony Machine, and continued to play the New York club scene. He landed a solo recording contract with RCA, and released one album with Lee Crystal (drums; later of Joan Jett's Blackhearts) and Johnny Ráo (guitar).

He moved to Los Angeles in the early 1990s and recorded one record, (Sleep) Baby Doll, for Fishhead Records. His bandmates on this record were: Brian Keats, drums, John Carlucci, bass, and Oliver LeBaron on lead guitar, with guest appearances by Frank Infante of Blondie and Derwood Andrews of Generation X. In the late '90s he teamed up with the Los Angeles punk band the Streetwalkin' Cheetahs for some touring and they recorded a live radio broadcast on KXLU that remains unreleased. The tour ended with an Atlanta show at the Navarre annual conference co-headlining with John Entwistle. In 2004 he reunited with the surviving members of the New York Dolls, along with Steve Conte, Brian Koonin and Brian Delaney. Arthur Kane, who died in 2004, was replaced by Sami Yaffa of Hanoi Rocks. They released three records: One Day It Will Please Us To Remember Even This (2005), Cause I Sez So (2009), and Dancing Backward in High Heels (2011). The reunion was filmed as part of a documentary on former band member Kane that was released in 2005 as New York Doll.

On March 18, 2010, at the South by Southwest music festival in Austin, Texas, Sylvain and Cheetah Chrome of Dead Boys and Rocket from the Tombs debuted their new band, the Batusis. Their EP is on Smog Veil Records.

In November 2012, Sylvain posted a video for his new single, "Leaving New York", on the Internet, and available on iTunes on December 2, 2012.

In 2013 and 2014 Sylvain joined with Glen Matlock as the Sex Doll Tour.

In 2015, Sylvain emerged with a new band called Sylvain Sylvain and the Sylvains from Austin, Texas, consisting of Chris Alaniz (drums), Jason "Ginchy" Kottwitz (guitar), and Gabriel Von Asher (bass). In March 2016, they performed at South by Southwest.

In 2018, Sylvain joined Steve Conte, Sami Yaffa, and Robert Eriksson for two one-off dates in Tokyo as The Dolls. They played at Shinjuku Marz on February 11, and Shimokitazawa Garden on February 12.

== Personal life ==
After living in Atlanta for several years, Sylvain moved to Nashville in 2015. On April 27, 2019, Sylvain announced that he had cancer. He set up a GoFundMe page to raise money to help pay for treatment. He died from cancer at his home on January 13, 2021, at age 69.

== Discography ==
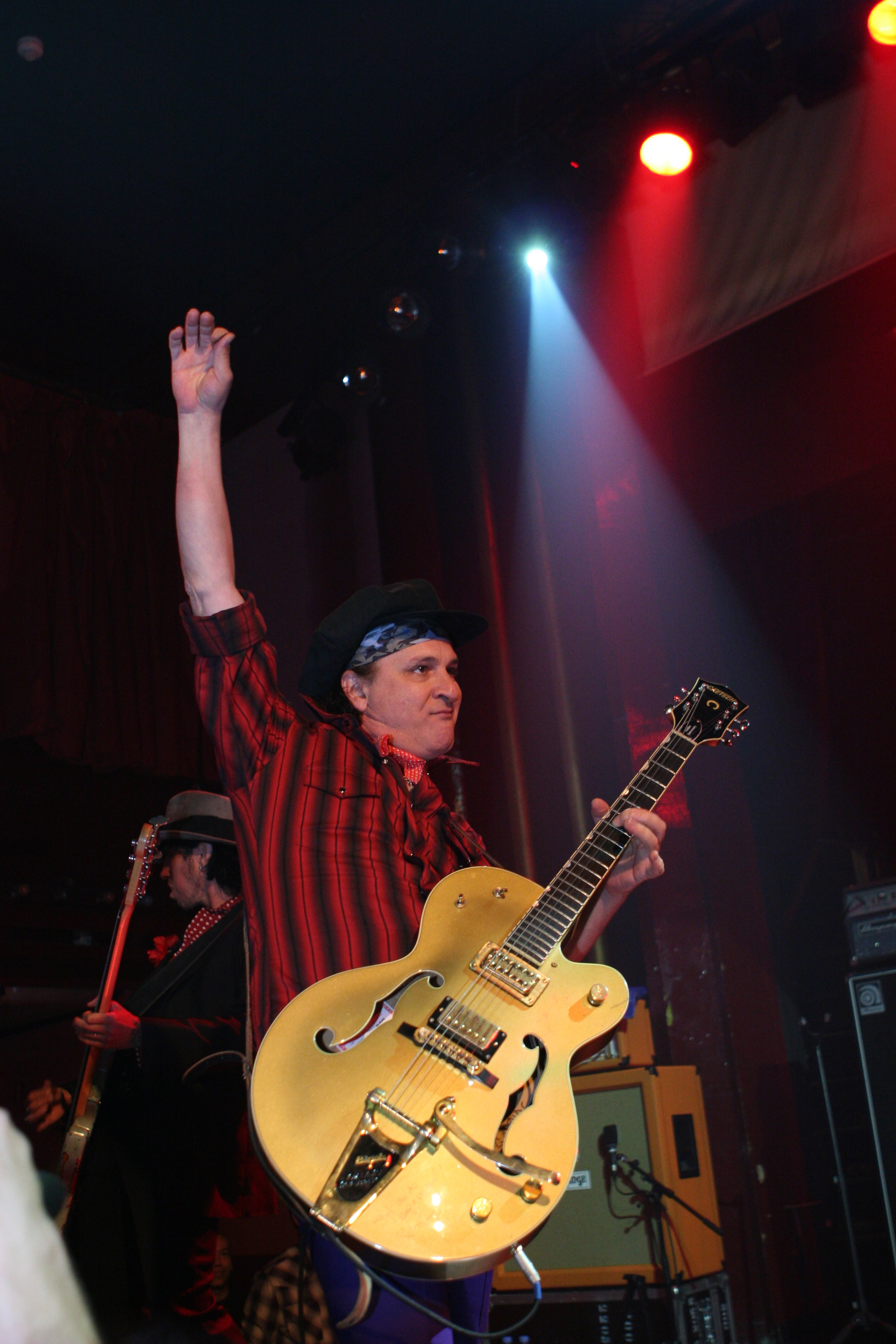
Sylvain with the New York Dolls in 2008

=== With New York Dolls ===
- New York Dolls (1973, Mercury Records)
- Too Much Too Soon (1974, Mercury Records)
- The Return of the New York Dolls: Live from Royal Festival Hall (2004, Attack Records)
- One Day It Will Please Us to Remember Even This (2006, Roadrunner Records)
- Cause I Sez So (2009, Atco Records)
- Tokyo Dolls Live (credited to 'David and Sylvain') – a live album by the Dolls line-up of Johansen and Sylvain with Peter Jordan/Chris Robison/Tony Machine. French Fan Club/New Rose.
- Red Patent Leather – live album of McLaren-era Dolls allegedly produced by Sylvain, with original manager Marty Thau credited as Executive Producer
- Dancing Backward in High Heels (2011, 429 Records)

=== As Sylvain Sylvain ===
- Sylvain Sylvain (1980, RCA Records – No. 123 Billboard 200)
- Sleep Baby Doll (1998, Fishhead Records)
- Leaving New York single (2012, self-released)

=== With Syl Sylvain and the Teardrops ===
- Syl Sylvain and the Teardrops (1981, RCA Records)

=== With Sylvain Sylvain and The Criminal$ ===
- 78 Criminals (1985, Fan Club)
- Bowery Butterflies (2000, Munster Records)

=== With She Wolves ===
- Sheena Is a Punk Rocker single (2007, Poptown Records)

=== With the Batusis ===
- Batusis EP (2010, Smog Veil Records)

=== With Roman Sandals ===
- This Is It Single (1984, Body Rock)

=== As producer ===
- River City Rebels, Hate To Be Loved album (2004, Victory Records).

'Motorcycle Boy', 'Popsicle' album (1991, Triple X Records).

== Bibliography ==
- Lazell, Barry. Punk! An A-Z, Hamlyn, 1995
- Ruppli, Michel; Novitsky, Ed. The Mercury Labels. A Discography, Vol. V., Record and Artist Indexes, Greenwood Press, 1993.
