= Otis (Mojo Nixon album) =

Studio album by Mojo Nixon
- Released: 1990
- Label: Enigma
- Producer: Jim Dickinson

Mojo Nixon chronology
Otis (1990)	Whereabouts Unknown (1995)

Singles from Otis
- 1. "Don Henley Must Die" Released: 1990

Professional ratings
Review scores
Source	Rating
AllMusic	3/5 stars
Entertainment Weekly	B+
Orlando Sentinel	4/5 stars
The Village Voice	(choice cut)

Otis is the debut solo album by Mojo Nixon. Released in 1990, it featured guest appearances by John Doe of X, Country Dick Montana (Beat Farmers), Bill Davis (Dash Rip Rock) and Eric Roscoe Ambel (The Del-Lords).

Nixon's first album since splitting with Skid Roper, and released by Enigma Records, the album was seen as potentially Nixon's break-out album but the record label's demise due to financial issues dashed any chance of success.

The album includes humorous commentary on targets such as soft rock ("Don Henley Must Die"), the legal profession ("Destroy All Lawyers"), politics, and Shane MacGowan's teeth. Featuring a band of established musicians from other bands and produced by Jim Dickinson, the album's music was considered to be stronger than Nixon's previous releases.

== Track listing ==
1. "Destroy All Lawyers" (3:00)
2. "I Wanna Race Bigfoot Trucks" (3:45)
3. "Ain't High Falutin'" (3:16)
4. "Shane's Dentist" (2:04)
5. "Rabies Baby" (3:30)
6. "Put a Sex Mo-Sheen in the White House" (4:18)
7. "Star Spangled Mojo" (Traditional; arranged by Mojo Nixon) (1:23)
8. "You Can Dress 'Em Up (But You Can't Take 'Em Out)" (2:51)
9. "Don Henley Must Die" (4:20)
10. "Perry Mason of Love" (5:46)
11. "Took Out the Trash and Never Came Back" (4:42)
12. "Gonna Be a New World" (3:53)

== Personnel ==
- Mojo Nixon – vocals, guitar, sheep
- John Doe – bass guitar, backing vocals, monkey socks
- Country Dick Montana – drums, deep vocals, zipperneck
- Bill Davis – guitar, backing vocals, hatchet-ass
- Eric Roscoe Ambel – guitar, backing vocals, lightbulb
- Jim Spake – saxophone
- Reed McCoy – trumpet
- East Memphis Slim – keyboards
- William C. Brown III – backing vocals
- Zooty – bells
- Dale Lavi - aluminum cans
- Luther Dickinson – teenage guitar
- Robby Turner – steel guitar

Technical

- Bob Krusen – engineering, mix
- Jim Dickinson – mixing
- Karen Kuehn – photography
- Gopher Killer – Polaroid
- Rudy Tuesday – design
