= The Pursuit of Happiness (Beat Farmers album) =

Studio album by the Beat Farmers
- Released: 1987
- Studio: Indigo Ranch, Malibu, CA
- Label: Curb/MCA
- Producer: Dave Jerden

The Beat Farmers chronology
Van Go (1986)	The Pursuit of Happiness (1987)	Poor & Famous (1989)

The Pursuit of Happiness is an album by the American band the Beat Farmers, released in 1987. The band supported the album with a North American tour that included shows with Mojo Nixon and Skid Roper.

The first single, "Dark Light", peaked at No. 27 on Billboard's Album Rock Tracks chart. "Hollywood Hills", for which a video was shot, was also released as a single.

== Production ==
Recorded at Indigo Ranch, in Malibu, the album was produced by Dave Jerden. Founding member Buddy Blue was replaced by Joey Harris. Country Dick Montana sang on the cover of Johnny Cash's "Big River". "Rosie" is a cover of the Tom Waits song. Steve Berlin played saxophone on the album. In a dig at the PMRC, the band allegedly included a "positive" subliminal message on the album.

== Critical reception ==
Professional ratings
Review scores
Source	Rating
AllMusic	3/5 stars
The Encyclopedia of Popular Music	3/5 stars
Houston Chronicle	4/5 stars
Los Angeles Daily News	B
MusicHound Rock: The Essential Album Guide	3/5 stars
The Philadelphia Inquirer	3/4 stars

The Vancouver Sun called the album "rocking with the familiar tough R&B favored by guitarist Jerry Raney, reeling with the hilarious depravity favored by wildman drummer Country Dick, and soaring with the touch of majesty brought into the fold by Harris." The Philadelphia Inquirer wrote: "Blunt, vehement rock that regularly partakes of a country lilt, this is the West Coast quartet's best album yet."

The Houston Chronicle noted that "few if any rock bands have a better understanding of the essential difference between ego and art." The Los Angeles Daily News concluded: "Until either Rainy or Harris cuts a path as striking as Montana's, the Farmers will be just another good rockin' roots band with a joke instead of a great band with a sense of humor." The Times determined that "although the Farmers hold rank as possibly the greatest bar-band in the world, this is a patchy collection redeemed mostly by the efforts of the new guitarist, Joey Harris." The Oregonian listed the album among the 10 best of 1987.

AllMusic deemed "Hollywood Hills" "one of the finest tracks the group ever recorded."

== Track listing ==
No.	Title	Length
1.	"Hollywood Hills"	4:17
2.	"Ridin'"	4:08
3.	"Dark Light"	4:06
4.	"Make It Last"	3:59
5.	"Key to the World"	3:22
6.	"God Is Here Tonight"	3:38
7.	"Big Big Man"	3:53
8.	"Elephant Day Parade"	2:42
9.	"Rosie"	2:22
10.	"Texas"	3:24
11.	"Big River"	2:38
