= Elvis Presley death conspiracy theories =

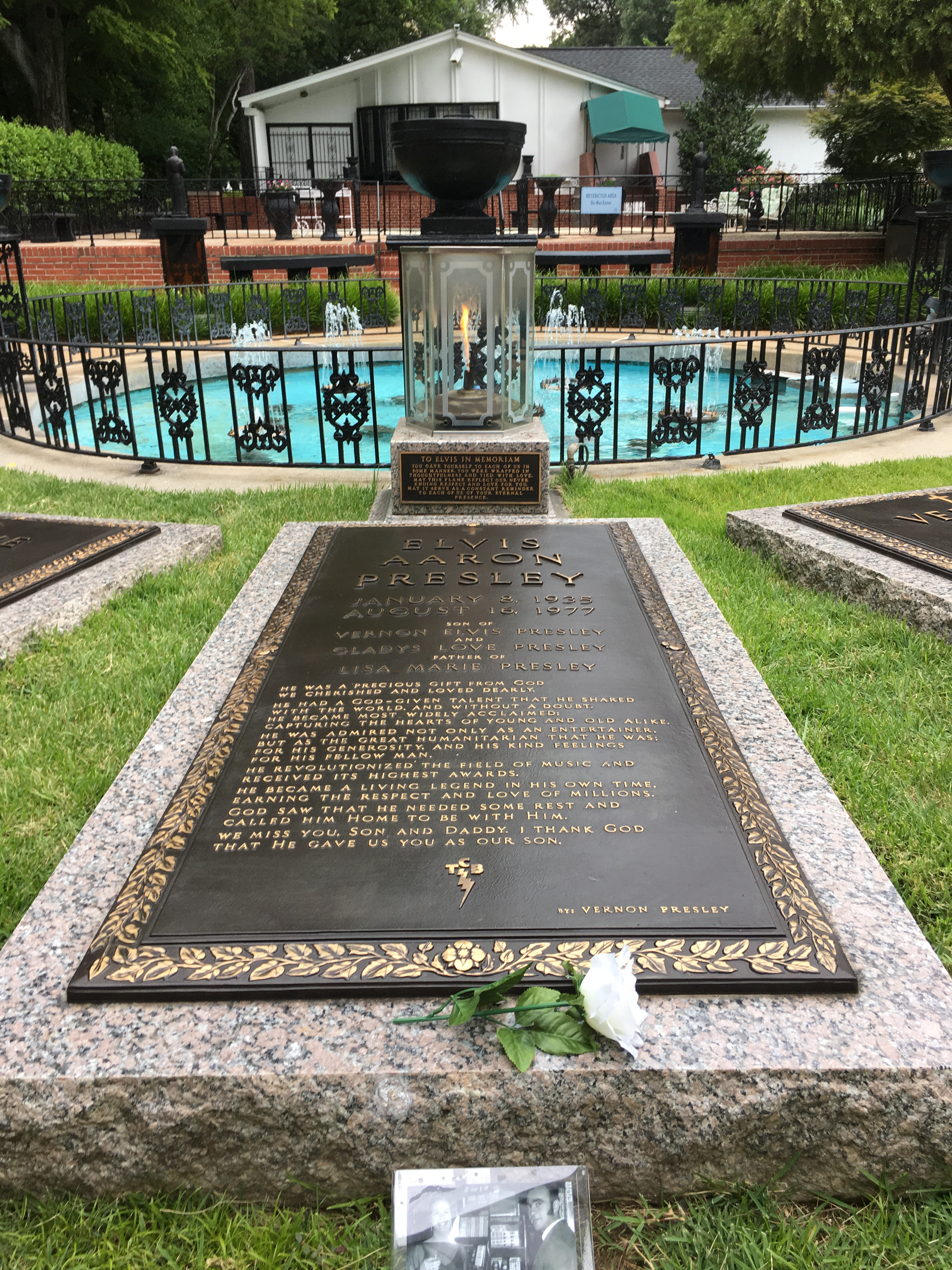
The grave of Elvis Presley at Graceland in Memphis, Tennessee

Since Elvis Presley's death on August 16, 1977, various discredited conspiracy theories have circulated stating that he may still be alive. "Elvis sightings" from people claiming to have seen him alive after this date are a phenomenon both as an ironic meme and also as part of a genuine belief for some.

In the early 1980s, the possibility of Presley still being alive was a niche topic discussed by a fringe demographic of fans in underground zines. It crossed over into widespread media attention in 1987 after a woman named Louise Welling falsely claimed to have seen Elvis at a Burger King in Kalamazoo, Michigan. The absurdity, "Middle America-ness" and the sound of the name "Kalamazoo" made for an ironic, light story in newspaper and television outlets. Theories and misinformation on the topic were then widely popularized by authors Gail Brewer-Giorgio and Major Bill Smith, who were given a platform by American and international media. Two TV specials that perpetuated these theories, The Elvis Files and The Elvis Conspiracy, aired internationally in 1991 and 1992.

Since then, popular interest in the topic has waned but "Elvis sightings" have stayed resonant as a part of pop culture. The conspiracy theory itself has become iconic as an example of the "genre" and a forerunner of the post-truth era, going on to influence many other theories including QAnon.

== History and evolution of the conspiracy theories ==
=== 1977–early 1980s: Pre-Kalamazoo ===
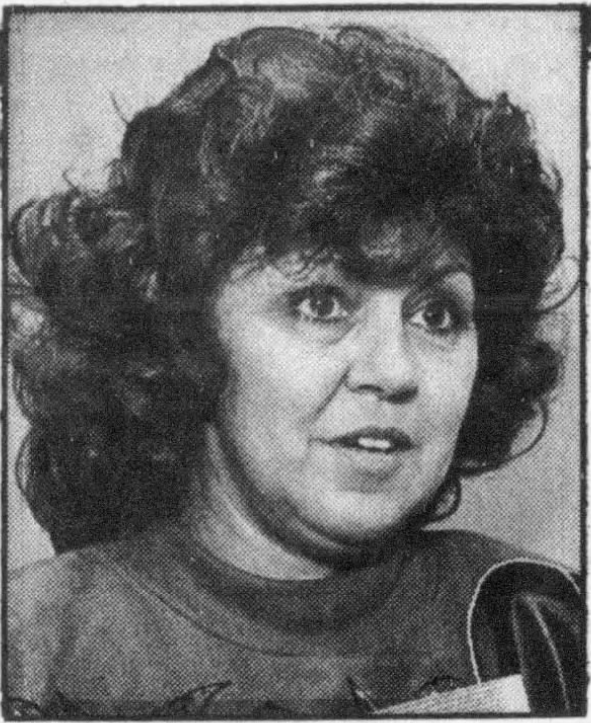
Gail Brewer-Giorgio, author of Orion and Is Elvis Alive?

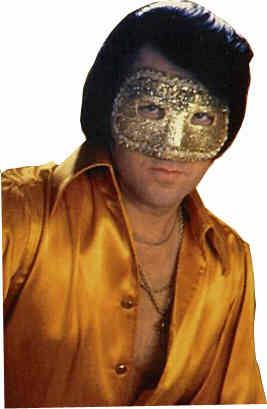
Jimmy Ellis, known as "Orion"

Presley died on August 16, 1977. His death is easily verifiable both through eyewitnesses and documentation. Presley's girlfriend Ginger Alden found his body in an ensuite bathroom at Graceland. She raised the alarm and quickly summoned his father Vernon Presley and close friend Joe Esposito, as well as his daughter Lisa Marie Presley. The body was then transported to the Memphis Baptist Hospital, where medical personnel produced both a death certificate and an autopsy report on file with the State of Tennessee.

The earliest known alleged "Elvis sighting" was the very next day at the Memphis International Airport where a man resembling him supposedly gave the name "Jon Burrows" when boarding an international flight (sometimes cited as going to Buenos Aires). This was a name Presley travelled under during his lifetime, and searching for uses of this name post-1977 became a recurring theme of the conspiracy theory. However, international flights were not available from Memphis airport in 1977 and it has never had service to Buenos Aires.

In 1978, author Gail Brewer-Giorgio published a novel entitled Orion based on Presley's life but with an ending in which the main character fakes his own death. At the same time, an album was released on Presley's former label Sun Records featuring a masked singer named Orion with a voice similar to Presley's. Some interpreted the release of the book and album together as meaning that Presley was still alive and had begun recording as Orion. The singer was in fact Jimmy Ellis, with the Sun Records brand identity having been sold to Shelby Singleton since its iconic 1950s heyday. Brewer-Giorgio claimed at the time to have no connection to Ellis or this other use of Orion. In later years, she would even claim that Ellis and Singleton had violated her copyright. However, in the 2015 documentary Orion: The Man Who Would Be King, both Ellis and Brewer-Giorgio say they worked together on the Orion phenomenon in advance of both the book and album coming out. Ellis also claimed Brewer-Giorgio approached him after a performance and told him "You are Orion."

In 1979, a two-part TV special investigating Presley's death entitled The Elvis Cover-Up aired on 20/20, hosted by Geraldo Rivera. The "cover-up" referred to was an attempt to hide Presley's misuse of prescription medication and the role this played in his death, which the special documents thoroughly. The second part directly implicated Presley's former doctor George C. Nichopoulos who was accused of overprescribing drugs to the singer for many years. Rivera does not suggest at any time in this special that Presley may still be alive. However, a common misinterpretation of the special's title unintentionally led to some believing this was the case. Brewer-Giorgio would later exploit this by citing the TV special as evidence Presley was alive, at a time when it was not easily available for viewing.

Meanwhile, Ellis went onto some success performing as Orion while masked, including to some fans who genuinely believed that he was in fact Presley. However, the novel Orion fell out of print and did not succeed. Brewer-Giorgio blamed this on deliberate publisher neglect and claimed the reason behind this was that she had "gotten too close to the truth". This theory became the basis for her next so-called non-fiction book, The Most Incredible Elvis Presley Story Ever Told!

In the early 1980s, a recording began to circulate among fans that purported to be a recent interview with a living Presley discussing his life in hiding. The man on the tape tells the interviewer that he has been travelling internationally and has grown a beard "to keep from being recognised". An album of the same man singing was also released, entitled Do You Know Who I Am?, credited to "Sivle Sings Again" or "Sivle Nora" ("Elvis" and "Elvis Aron" spelt backwards). The album contained new versions of various Presley songs plus a cover of Eddie Rabbitt's 1980 hit "I Love A Rainy Night". During "Loving You", the singer stops the band to say that "somebody" just told him about the 1981 attempted assassination of Ronald Reagan. The voice on these tapes was actually David Darlock, who later claimed he was commissioned by the Eternally Elvis fan club who told him it was all intended for a fictional production.

=== 1987–1991: Post-Kalamazoo ===
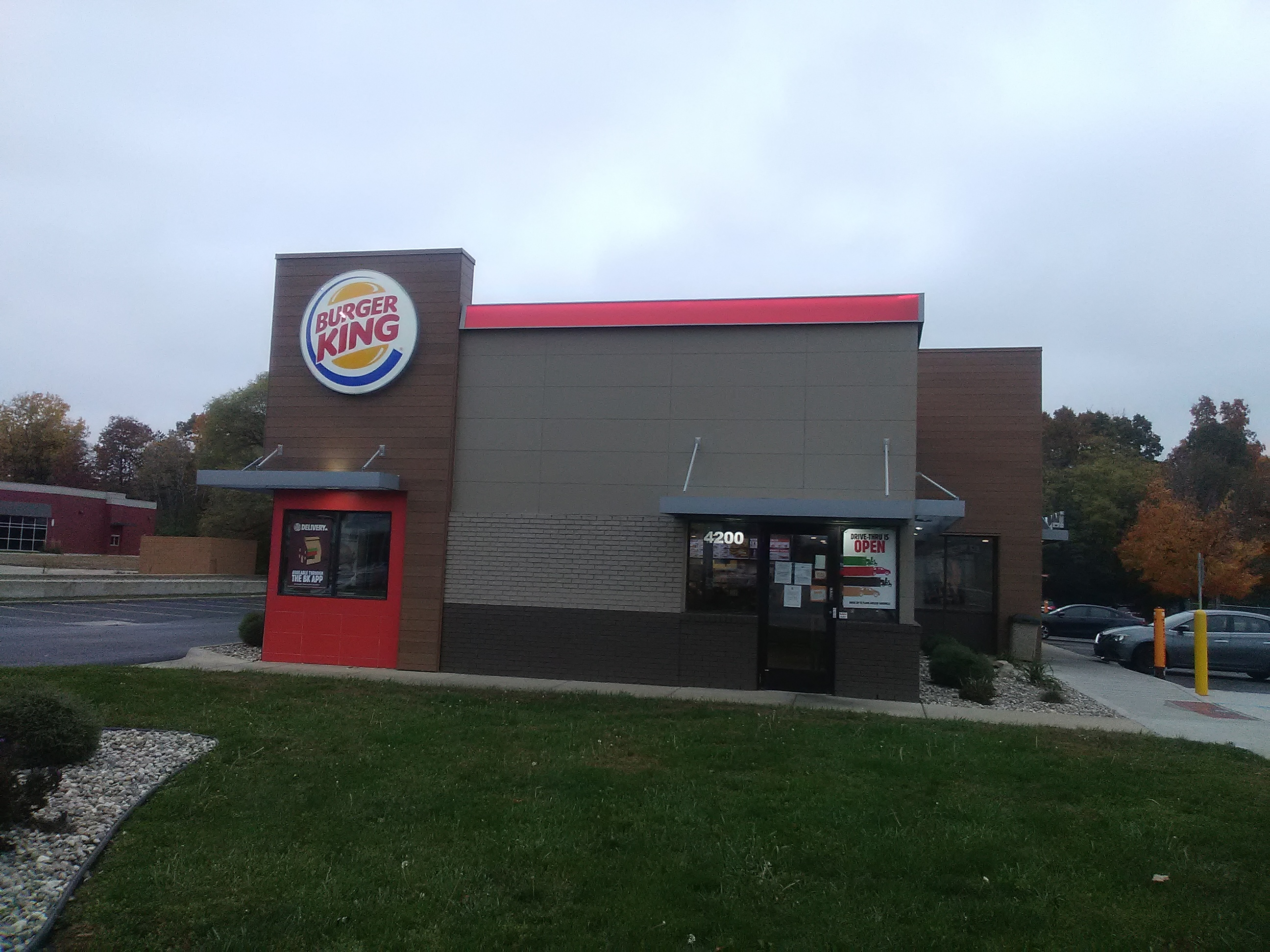
A Burger King restaurant in Kalamazoo, similar to the one at which Louise Welling falsely claimed to have seen Elvis Presley in 1987

A cover from the July 23, 1991, issue of Weekly World News

In 1987, a woman named Louise Welling claimed to have seen Presley at a Burger King in Kalamazoo, Michigan. This was picked up widely in newspapers, radio and television as it made for an attention-grabbing story, partly due to the "Middle America"-ness of the location and the sound of the name "Kalamazoo". The incident led to increased publicity for Elvis sightings and the conspiracy theory in general. Brewer-Giorgio appeared widely on television throughout 1988 discussing her theory. She was given a platform by Oprah Winfrey, Larry King and Rivera, all of whom helped elevate the conspiracy theory to international prominence.

Amidst the hype, The Most Incredible Elvis Presley Story Ever Told! was picked up by Tudor Books and reprinted in an expanded edition as Is Elvis Alive? This edition came bundled with a cassette of the Darlock recording, interspersed with commentary by Brewer-Giorgio speculating as to whether it may be Presley's voice, which it was not. The book was a significant commercial success, and Orion was also reprinted by Tudor.

Record producer Major Bill Smith was also a prominent figure in perpetuating the conspiracy theory. Smith authored a book entitled Memphis Mystery on the subject and claimed to be in current communication with Presley, releasing recordings that were purportedly of his voice recorded after 1977. On one occasion, Smith even went as far as to bring a man he falsely claimed to be Presley on air to do a live radio interview and take questions from callers. The interview can be heard on a cassette released by Smith, Elvis Lives.

In late 1988, LS Records released the single "Spelling on the Stone", sung by an uncredited vocalist implied to be Presley. The song's narrative suggested that Presley had not actually died, and that he was trying to communicate this to the world by deliberately misspelling his middle name "Aron" as "Aaron" on the tombstone at Graceland. In reality, the "spelling on the stone" is of no consequence as Presley used both spellings of his middle name interchangeably throughout his lifetime, including on his divorce certificate which clearly features "Aaron" in his own handwriting. Even if the tombstone was "misspelled", which it was not, the conspiracy theory adds an unlikely supposition that the reason for this is that Presley chose not just to fake his own death - also deliberately making it appear as if he had died on the toilet no less - but also to leave clues for others to interpret. Nevertheless, airplay received by "Spelling on the Stone" on country music formats caused a number of listeners to call in to radio stations and report sightings of the singer after hearing the song, while program directors of said stations debated whether or not the song's vocal track was actually Presley. The middle name spelling also became a common feature of the conspiracy theory.

The semi-humorous Weekly World News tabloid ran hyper-exaggerated and sensationalised stories about Presley being alive for several years beginning in the late 1980s. These stories, which supposedly tracked Presley on his travels throughout the US and Canada, became an iconic part of the Weekly World News brand.

In 1989, Rivera hosted a TV special entitled Wanted: Elvis Dead or Alive in which he challenged Brewer-Giorgio and Smith about their claims and expressed anger that his work on The Elvis Cover-Up a decade earlier had been taken out of context. Darlock also appeared and told the live audience that his was the voice on the cassette that came with Is Elvis Alive?, even producing the contract he originally signed to record the tape for what he claims he was told was a fictional production. To demonstrate his ability to impersonate Presley, Darlock then held a mock seance - only as entertainment, without making any supernatural claims - by focusing his gaze on Rivera's watch until the hands stopped, then rubbing his temples and concentrating. He then told the audience, in character as Presley:

It started when I was just a baby, just an infant baby. I learned a lot about music. I learned how to play the guitar. And that's the type of thing that I've been doing a lot. But um, in the past twelve years there's been a lot of times that people believe that I'm still living. And naturally, that's not true. And as far as growing beards and this and that to keep from being recognised - I kept a secret. I kept a secret deep down inside. And it's not pressed between any pages like it found a place to hide. Thank you.

=== 1991–1992: Bill Bixby TV specials ===
Bill Bixby and Gail Brewer-Giorgio during The Elvis Files, showing the audience the results of a live phone poll as to whether or not Presley is still alive

In 1991, a live TV special entitled The Elvis Files aired internationally and was hosted by Bill Bixby, who performed as an actor in two films with Presley. The special featured Brewer-Giorgio and others discussing their claims of Presley's possible faked death, and also investigated numerous Elvis sightings. Amongst other misinformation, this special featured the "spelling on the stone" argument plus several 1980s-era photos that purportedly depicted Presley. One showed a man resembling Presley in the poolhouse at Graceland. Another featured a man with similar facial structure to Presley who had been spotted alongside Reverend Jesse Jackson and Muhammad Ali. Author Monte Nicholson also appeared to discuss his novel The Presley Arrangement about Presley faking his own death, which he claimed had also "disappeared" from bookstores.

A sequel special, The Elvis Conspiracy, aired in 1992. Brewer-Giorgio did not appear as she had fallen out with Bixby and the producers. Nicholson appeared again to discuss a supposed correlation between a number of "Elvis sightings" and a paperwork trail of Presley's social security number being used in various places after his death. The two photos from the first special were also debunked. The man in the poolhouse was revealed to be Presley associate Al Strada. The man with Jackson and Ali was revealed to be Larry J. Kolb, who appeared on the show to explain the actual circumstances in which the photo was taken. Ali himself, who was a genuine friend of Presley's during his lifetime, also sent in a poem:

Elvis was the coolest, without a doubt;
If you say this chump Larry is Elvis, then I'll knock you out.

The Elvis Conspiracy contained references to an FBI operation from 1977 called Operation Fountain Pen that involved Presley and a criminal organisation called The Fraternity, details of which had recently been uncovered from declassified documents. Combining this with the fact Presley had been gifted a badge granting him the status of an honorary FBI agent after visiting Richard Nixon in 1970, the special hypothesised that Presley may have gone into hiding after 1977 to work as a secret agent. While both Operation Fountain Pen and The Fraternity are based in fact, the operation only concerned fraud against Presley's father Vernon, who had been scammed into paying inflated amounts for maintenance on the Presley private jets. This evidence, combined with the fact that Presley's status as an FBI agent was strictly an honorary title, does not add up to a compelling argument that he may have faked his death for the purposes of being undercover.

The special walked back and debunked other claims from the first, and featured interviews with real-life Presley associates Joe Esposito and Larry Geller, before ultimately coming to the conclusion Presley was in fact dead. This displeased Brewer-Giorgio, who threatened to sue the producers.

In late 1992, the Weekly World News announced that Presley had finally died. A follow-up article declared that this had also been a hoax.

=== 1993 to present ===
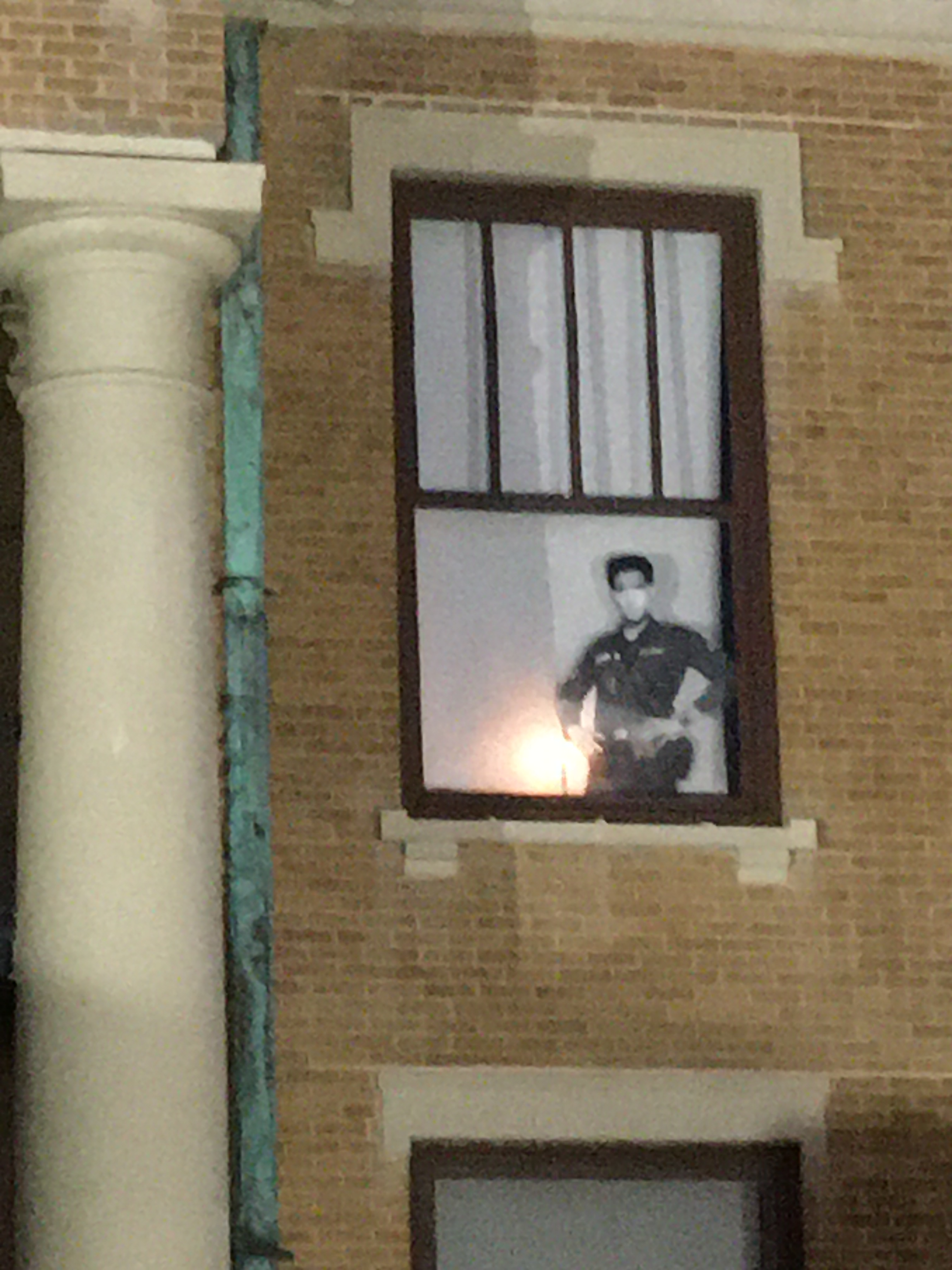
A cardboard cutout of Presley seen wearing a mask during the COVID-19 pandemic, at the window of the Old Citrus County Courthouse in Inverness, Florida

Bixby hosted the two specials (the second of which featured an intimate discussion about death with Presley's spiritual confidant Geller) while himself dying of cancer. In his final months he directed The Woman Who Loved Elvis, a TV movie featuring a sympathetic and humanistic view of a Presley fan, based on the novel Graced Land by Laura Kalpakian. It aired in April 1993, six months before Bixby's death on 21 November.

Since the early 1990s, mainstream interest in the conspiracy theory has waned but alleged Elvis sightings have continued both as a source of humor and from an increasingly fringe demographic of believers.

In 1995, R. Serge Denisoff published a book entitled True Disbelievers: The Elvis Contagion about the origins and history of the conspiracy theory.

After many years performing as Orion, Ellis opened a pawn shop where he was shot and killed during an armed robbery in 1998.

In 1999, Brewer-Giorgio published her final book, Elvis Undercover: Is He Alive and Coming Back? Amongst other misinformation, this book claimed Presley may have been an extra in the 1998 film Finding Graceland. That same year, some claimed to have seen Presley at Legoland California.

In January 2015, a fake news website claimed that an 80-year-old homeless man in San Diego named Jessie had been posthumously identified by DNA evidence as Presley. A groundskeeper working at Graceland was claimed to be Presley in 2016. One persistent rumour held that Presley was visible as an extra in the 1990 film Home Alone, wearing a turtleneck and a sports jacket during a scene shot at an airport. The man turned out to be Gary Richard Grott, who died of a heart attack in February 2016. Another false claim that has survived to the 2020s as an earnestly-believed conspiracy theory holds that Presley may be living as preacher Bob Joyce, despite the fact that Joyce is clearly significantly younger than a living Presley would be.

Brewer-Giorgio died on January 25, 2025, in Georgia.

Some commentators see conspiracy theories about Presley's supposed faked death as forerunners of many other outlandish claims in pop culture and the political arena, including that Michael Jackson may still be alive and the idea that Avril Lavigne has been replaced as well as the 9/11 truth movement, QAnon and COVID denial.

== In popular media ==
- The 1989 song "Elvis is Everywhere" by Mojo Nixon and Skid Roper discusses Elvis conspiracy theories
- The 1990 song "Elvis Is Dead" by the musical group Living Colour addressed rumors of Presley's survival.
- In the 1997 film Men in Black, which states that several famous celebrities are in fact extraterrestrials, Agent J (Will Smith) asks Agent K (Tommy Lee Jones) if he is aware that Presley is dead. K cheerfully replies "No, Elvis is not dead, he just went home!"
- The 1997 song "Elvis está vivo" by Andrés Calamaro celebrates all these rumors.
- The 2002 film Bubba Ho-Tep stars Bruce Campbell as a man who believes he is Presley, who switched identities with an Elvis impersonator but was unable to return to his old life after his counterpart died in 1977.
- Two other films, Elvis Has Left the Building (2004) and 3000 Miles to Graceland (2001), include references to Elvis being alive or sighted.
- In Episode 34 of Animaniacs (1993), the Wheel of Morality references the idea of Elvis being alive by stating "Elvis lives on in our hearts, in his music, and...in a trailer park outside Milwaukee."
- In Season 1 Episode 8 of The Simpsons, the chalkboard gag said "I did not see Elvis"
