= Scott Ambrose Reilly =

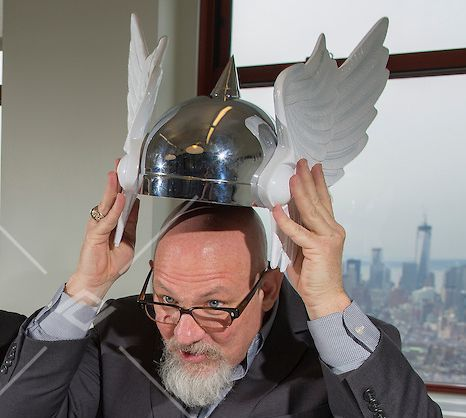
- Born: United States
- Employer: The Orchard

Scott Ambrose Reilly is a music executive whose expertise is in the digital music field. Since 2000, Reilly has held senior positions in digital music companies such as Digital Club Network, eMusic and Amazon. He is currently CEO of X5 Music Group. When Reilly exited Amazon's music division for its Kindle unit, his farewell letter to peers was leaked to the media and widely circulated for criticism of many in the established music industry.

== Career ==
=== Artist management ===
Raised in San Diego, California, Scott Ambrose Reilly started his music career as a fan, and spent much of the late 1980s following artists such as Mojo Nixon to gigs. Nixon soon hired him to help on tour, and from there he became Nixon's long-term manager. He also appeared in the choir of several of his psychobilly albums, such as 1989's Root Hog or Die.

From 1986 to 1999 Reilly owned and operated Bullethead Management in the greater New York City area. The company grew from being a one-man artist management practice to having twelve employees and over 20 clients, including Mojo Nixon, Dash Rip Rock and Fred Eaglesmith. Reilly began using BBC systems to sell concert tickets online, and regularly attended concerts such as SXSW. In the 1990s he began managing the band God Street Wine, who were early adopters of internet promotion. They launched a website in 1994, also selling tickets and mp3s online.

=== Digital Club Network ===
In 2000 Reilly became executive director of Digital Club Festival, the four-day launch event for Digital Club Network, or DCN. DCN was a New York-based website that webcast live from 54 music venues across the country, making it the world's largest webcaster of live music at the time. Digital Club Network also offered paid music downloads and a few live CDs by artists such as the Meat Puppets on its own label.

From 2000 to 2003 he was Senior VP of venue/artist licensing and relations of DCN, and he became president in 2003. In 2004 he oversaw DCN's acquisition by eMusic. Reilly was named Senior VP of Content Acquisition and Label Relations, and the eMusic catalog grew from 400,000 tracks to 1.5million tracks, making it the largest DRM-free catalog in the world.

While at eMusic from 2004 to 2006, Reilly also became president of eMusicLive and helped develop eMusicLive's "See a Show, Buy a Show" (SASBAS) technology, where the company recorded the live performances of consenting artists, then instantly burned CDs to sell alongside band merchandise. eMusicLive was the first company to have permanent fixtures in multiple clubs in a single city.

=== Amazon.com ===
Amazon MP3

In September 2006, he moved to Seattle to oversee the launched of Amazon MP3 in the United States, England, Denmark, France, Austria, Switzerland, and China. Hired as senior manager of digital music at Amazon.com, Reilly oversaw content deals, operations and helped maintain relationships with labels.

Amazon MP3 became iTune's most aggressive competitor, building a DRM-free catalog of more than 15 million tracks. Around 2007, most online digital music was purchased from iTunes, with Apple DRM contained so they could only function on Apple products. Allofmp3.com, one of the few early DRM-free businesses, were sued and forced out of business, leaving Apple with the monopoly. Under Reilly Amazon opened an online DRM-free music library at 99 cents a song, becoming the first service to launch all four major labels in MP3 format. Apple followed suit, beginning to offer DRM-free options.

Kindle

In April 2010 he left Amazon MP3 to work on the Amazon division Kindle. He stated he had overseen more than 10,000 digital licensing deals at that point in his career.

When Reilly exited for Kindle, his farewell letter to the music industry was leaked to the media and widely circulated. He spoke positively of Amazon, but with open contempt for its competitors. Specifically, they'd pressured recording companies to drop support for Amazon's successful Daily Deal practice, where Amazon lowered prices on specific music titles and promoted them heavily the day before they were released.

While at Kindle he worked as senior manager for global business development. However, one year later he announced he was leaving Amazon to serve as the U.S. CEO of X5 Music Group. His reasons were again amicable towards Amazon, with him stating: "I loved working at Amazon and their singular focus on the customer taught me a great deal. But the lure of working with a music great company who have had successes in digital music was just too strong."

=== X5 Music Group ===
As North American CEO of X5 Music Group, Reilly helped launch the division in the Empire State Building and expanded its catalogue of compilations. In 2011 X5 was the No. 2 classical music label on the US charts, second only to Universal Music. Also in 2011 the classical label began branching into genres such as folk, bluegrass, blues, and jazz, and forming partnerships with non-classical labels such as Sun Records, whose back catalog included artists such as Johnny Cash and Jerry Lee Lewis. In November 2011 X5 released one of its most successful albums, The Greatest Video Game Music, performed by the London Philharmonic Orchestra. It received praise from IGN and was named "weirdest hit album" of 2011 by Rolling Stone.

At X5 Reilly manages relationships with digital music services including iTunes, Amazon, Spotify, Deezer, Xbox Music, MOG, Rhapsody for USA, EU, Australia, Asia and ROW. About X5's marketing strategy, Reilly has stated "you have to pay attention to the [outlets]. iTunes wants things to be designed well and look good. Amazon [likes] value and convenience. Spotify is search-based, so we created an app to browse classical music, and other apps are on the way." Reilly oversaw the launch in early 2012 of Classify, an app created through a partnership with X5 and Spotify that helps music browsers discover classical music.

X5 announced in April 2013 that it had started U5, a joint venture with the music conglomerate Universal Music Group, headed by Reilly. It gave X5 access to over 50,000 of Universal's classical tracks, and another 50,000 jazz and blues songs.

Reilly has been interviewed about digital media in media outlets such as Marketplace, the New York Times, and the Wall Street Journal.

=== The Orchard ===
Scott started at The Orchard in May 2013. As head of a newly created division at The Orchard, Scott oversees the acquisition of new catalogs. Some of the catalogs already under his supervision include, TVT Records, Hathut Records and Xanadu Records. Scott's division recently acquired the Blind Pig Records catalog.

== Discography ==
=== With Mojo Nixon and Skid Roper ===
- 1986: Get Out Of My Way! (Restless Records)
- 1987: Bo-Day-Shus!!! (Enigma Records)
- 1989: Root Hog or Die (I.R.S. Records) ... choir/chorus
- 1990: Unlimited Everything (Enigma Records)

== See also ==
- X5 Music Group
