= Van Go (album) =

Studio album by the Beat Farmers
- Released: 1986
- Studios: Indigo Ranch, Malibu, CA
- Genres: Rock, country rock
- Label: Curb/MCA
- Producer: Craig Leon

The Beat Farmers chronology
Glad 'N' Greasy (1986)	Van Go (1986)	The Pursuit of Happiness (1987)

Van Go is the second album by the American rock band the Beat Farmers, released in 1986. It was the band's first album for Curb Records.

The album peaked at No. 135 on the Billboard 200.

== Production ==
The guitarist Buddy Blue left the band during the recording sessions for Van Go; he was replaced by Joey Harris. The album was produced by Craig Leon. Beat Farmers drummer Country Dick Montana later described the album as having "'more of an AOR sound.'" Many of the songs are about cars and transportation.

== Critical reception ==
Professional ratings
Review scores
Source	Rating
AllMusic	3/5 stars
Robert Christgau	B
The Encyclopedia of Popular Music	3/5 stars
The Evening Sun	3.5/5 stars
Houston Chronicle	4.5/5 stars
MusicHound Rock: The Essential Album Guide	2.5/5 stars
The Philadelphia Inquirer	3/4 stars

The Washington Post wrote that the Beat Farmers "sing about the barroom world of retooled cars, busted marriages and dead-end jobs... The band is as capable of irony as [Lou] Reed or [Neil] Young, but the Beat Farmers never allow it to interfere with their back-to-back basics attack." Robert Christgau thought that "except for the deadpan 'Gun Sale at the Church' and maybe the Johnny Cash impressions, their country-rock is now proudly generic."

Trouser Press called the album "amiable but rather thin." The Toronto Star opined that the "best thing about the Beat Farmers is that they make no outrageous claims for themselves; their music is honest and earthy, but it doesn't pretend to defend the dignity of the working man, free enterprise, the American Way."

AllMusic praised the "amazing cover of Neil Young's 'Powderfinger', which sounds like it was written for the band."

== Track listing ==
No.	Title	Length
1.	"Riverside"	3:27
2.	"Deceiver"	2:48
3.	"Powderfinger"	3:46
4.	"Seven Year Blues"	2:31
5.	"Blue Chevrolet"	2:50
6.	"I Want You, Too"	1:54
7.	"Road of Ruin"	2:27
8.	"Buy Me a Car"	2:46
9.	"Gun Sale at the Church"	2:57
10.	"Bigger Fool Than Me"	2:48
11.	"Big Ugly Wheels"	2:18

== Personnel ==
- Buddy Blue – guitar, vocals
- Rolle Dexter – bass
- Joey Harris – guitar, vocals
- Country Dick Montana – drums, vocals
- Jerry Raney – guitar, vocals
