= Unlimited Everything =

Compilation album by Mojo Nixon and Skid Roper
- Released: 1990
- Recorded: 1985–1989
- Length: 47:56
- Label: Enigma

Mojo Nixon and Skid Roper chronology
Root Hog or Die (1989)	Unlimited Everything (1990)

Professional ratings
Review scores
Source	Rating
AllMusic	4/5 stars

Unlimited Everything is a "best of" compilation album released by Mojo Nixon and Skid Roper in 1990.

It includes the outtake "Amsterdam Dogshit Blues" (previously released on the compilation The Enigma Variations 2) and the "(619) 239-KING" B-side "I Gotta Connect," from which the album's title is derived. "Jesus at McDonald's" is the version from their first album, Mojo Nixon and Skid Roper. This release is the only appearance on CD of the original mix of "Stuffin' Martha's Muffin," from the Frenzy LP. The disc was apparently released in Europe only.

== Track listing ==
1. The Amazing Bigfoot Diet (2:59)
2. Debbie Gibson Is Pregnant with My Two-Headed Love Child (2:07)
3. Jesus at McDonald's (5:27)
4. Amsterdam Dogshit Blues (2:10)
5. Stuffin' Martha's Muffin (2:55)
6. Burn Down the Malls (4:55)
7. Elvis is Everywhere (4:53)
8. Louisiana Liplock (4:20)
9. (619) 239-KING (6:03)
10. Burn Your Money (5:16)
11. Rockin' Religion (3:06)
12. I Gotta Connect (3:45)
