= Poor & Famous =

Studio album by the Beat Farmers
- Released: 1989
- Studio: Indigo Ranch, Malibu, CA/The Complex, Los Angeles, CA/A&M, Los Angeles, CA/Hit Single, San Diego, CA
- Genre: Rock
- Label: Curb/MCA
- Producer: Thom Panunzio

The Beat Farmers chronology
The Pursuit of Happiness (1987)	Poor & Famous (1989)	Viking Lullabys (1994)

Poor & Famous is an album by the American band the Beat Farmers, released in 1989. It was produced by Thom Panunzio and executive produced by Denny Bruce. Its release was delayed by months by Curb/MCA, which urged the band to write "hit" songs. The band supported the album with a North American tour.

The album is the band's first to include all original songs (with writing help from Steve Marshall on "Wait So Long" and "The Trouble with You"; David & Douglas Farange on "If I Can Hold"; Mojo Nixon on "King of Sleaze"; and frequent collaborator Paul Kamanski on "Time in Between").

== Critical reception ==
Professional ratings
Review scores
Source	Rating
AllMusic	2/5 stars
The Encyclopedia of Popular Music	2/5 stars
MusicHound Rock: The Essential Album Guide	2/5 stars

The Chicago Tribune said that the album "finds cow-punk pioneers the Beat Farmers moving, both musically and lyrically, into the rock mainstream."

Trouser Press called the album "a confusing mess that tries to cover too many stylistic bases", noting that its "barren personality deprives [the songs] of intensity."

== Track listing ==
No.	Title	Length
1.	"Socialite"	3:40
2.	"Hideway"	5:13
3.	"What I Mean to Say"	3:38
4.	"Wait So Long"	4:10
5.	"Wheels"	2:35
6.	"Girl I Almost Married"	3:10
7.	"If I Can Hold"	3:41
8.	"King of Sleaze"	3:12
9.	"The Trouble with You"	2:55
10.	"Time in Between"	4:35

== Personnel ==
- Rolle Love – bass
- Joey Harris – guitar, vocals
- Country Dick Montana – drums, accordion, vocals
- Jerry Raney – guitar, vocals, harmonica
