= Whereabouts Unknown =

Studio album by Mojo Nixon
- Released: 1995
- Genres: Country rock; roots rock; rock
- Labels: Blutarski/Ripe & Ready
- Producer: Eric Ambel

Mojo Nixon chronology
Otis (1990)	Whereabouts Unknown (1995)	Gadzooks!!! The Homemade Bootleg (1997)

Whereabouts Unknown is an album by the American musician Mojo Nixon, released in 1995. Nixon supported the album by touring with his band, the Toadliquors.

== Production ==
Whereabouts Unknown was produced by Eric Ambel. Will Rigby played drums on the album. "Tie My Pecker to My Leg" was cowritten with Country Dick Montana. "Girlfriend in a Coma" is a cover of the Smiths' song, with additional lyrics. "My T.V. Is Watchin' Me" was inspired by Bob Stinson.

"Bring Me the Head of David Geffen", a song that appeared on advance copies of the album, was pulled right before the official release. The song later appeared on 1997's Gadzooks!!! The Homemade Bootleg.

== Critical reception ==
Professional ratings
Review scores
Source	Rating
Fort Worth Star-Telegram	3.5/5 stars
MusicHound Rock: The Essential Album Guide	3/5 stars

Trouser Press wrote that "the playing is crisp and perfunctory country-rock; instrumental accuracy is thoroughly wasted on (if not toxic to) a vocalist this instinctual... Fortunately, Mojo is in credibly foul form, and has enough solidly entertaining originals to make his own party happen." The Philadelphia Inquirer called the album "a roots-rock celebration of moral lassitude and the product of a sick mind." The Washington Times considered it "a blues-country mix that sounds like Muddy Waters and Ernest Tubb together on a bad hair day."

The Boston Globe deemed Nixon "a human gutterball, a strummin', cussin', frat-party for punks." The San Diego Union-Tribune noted that "Nixon has assembled a ruckus of a band that can swing and swagger along to his fabulously gruff, shag carpet of a voice." The Richmond Times-Dispatch labeled Nixon "the record industry's most beloved degenerate," writing that the album is "as politically incorrect as ever." The Fort Worth Star-Telegram praised the "crack garage/roots band chugging behind [Nixon]."

AllMusic wrote: "Nixon's humor remained as sophomoric as it was politically incorrect. As usual, he was pretty funny the first time around, though."

== Track listing ==
No.	Title	Length
1.	"Gotta Be Free"
2.	"Not as Much as Football"
3.	"Mr. Correct (Don't Tell Me What to Do)"
4.	"Buck Up & Stop Your Whinin'"
5.	"My Free Will Just Ain't Willin'"
6.	"Girlfriend in a Coma"
7.	"The Pleasurelegience"
8.	"Don't Ask Me Why I Drink"
9.	"My T.V. Is Watchin' Me"
10.	"Take a Look in My Eyes"
11.	"Tie My Pecker to My Leg"
12.	"You Can't Kill Me"
13.	"If I Can Dream"
