= Bodacious =

Bodacious may refer to:

- Bodacious (bull), #J31, a ProRodeo Hall of Fame bucking bull known in rodeo as "the world's most dangerous bull"
- Bodacious!, a 1984 album by Beau Williams

== See also ==
- Bo-Day-Shus!!!, a 1987 album by Mojo Nixon and Skid Roper
