= Frenzy (Mojo Nixon album) =

Studio album by Mojo Nixon and Skid Roper
- Released: 1986
- Studios: Hit City West, Los Angeles
- Genres: Blues; R&B; rockabilly
- Label: Restless
- Producer: Ron Goudie

Mojo Nixon and Skid Roper chronology
Get Out of My Way! (1986)	Frenzy (1986)	Bo-Day-Shus!!! (1987)

Frenzy is the second album by Mojo Nixon and Skid Roper, released in 1986.

The album was re-released on CD in 1987, with the EP Get Out Of My Way! added to the end. The CD uses the Get Out of My Way! mix of "Stuffin' Martha's Muffin," which filters the telephone conversation part of Nixon's opening monologue to sound like he is talking on the phone, instead of the original Frenzy LP mix. "Transylvanian Xmas" is a version of "Joy to the World," performed by Roper on harmonica with the melody tweaked to sound spooky; Nixon plays bongos. "Jesus at McDonalds" is a newer recording of the song from their first LP, Mojo Nixon and Skid Roper.

== Critical reception ==
Professional ratings
Review scores
Source	Rating
AllMusic	3/5 stars
Robert Christgau	B+
MusicHound Rock: The Essential Album Guide	3/5 stars
The Rolling Stone Album Guide	2.5/5 stars

Trouser Press wrote that "the musical accompaniment to Nixon’s often hysterical socio-political commentary is mostly a frisky down-home mixture of blues, R&B and rockabilly." The Los Angeles Times wrote that "the duo ravages the basic blues structure with violent strokes of new wave madness."

== Track listing ==
All songs written by Mojo Nixon and published by Tallywacker Tunes/La Rana Music except as indicated.

1. "The Amazing Bigfoot Diet"
2. "Stuffin' Martha's Muffin"
3. "I Hate Banks"
4. "Feeling Existential"
5. "Be My Lover" (Michael Bruce) Ezra Music BMI
6. "Where the Hell's My Money?"
7. "Gonna Put My Face on a Nuclear Bomb"
8. "Ain't Got No Boss"
9. "I'm Living with a Three-Foot Anti-Christ"
10. "Gonna Eat Them Words"
11. "Twilight's Last Gleaming" (Joey Harris) Harris Control BMI
12. "23 Mile Ride"
13. "In-A-Gadda-Da-Vida" (Doug Ingle) Ten East/Cotillion/Itasca BMI
14. "The Ballad of Wendell Scott"
15. "Get Out of My Way!" (CD Re-release)
16. "Rutabagas" (CD Re-release)
17. "Burn Down the Malls" (CD Re-release)
18. "Son of Santa" (CD Re-release)
19. "Transylvanian Xmas" (Traditional; arranged by Skid Roper) (CD Re-release)
20. "Jesus at McDonalds" (CD Re-release)

== Personnel ==
- Mojo Nixon – vocals, guitar, sonic love jug, bongos
- Skid Roper – washboard, banjo, mandolin, maracas, harmonica, vocal on "In-A-Gadda-Da-Vida", kick box, harp, bells, tambourine
- Steve Wynn – guest vocal on "Feeling Existential"
- The Bigfoot Choir – David Farage, Steve Wynn, Douglas Farage, Pete Webster, Chris Davies, Johnette Napolitano, Fish Karma, Bruce Joyner, Paul Kamanski, Scott A. Reilly
- Moron Tallywacker Choir – Allan Waddle, Dean Naleway, Charley Brown, Scott A. Reilly, Peter Holsapple, Ileen Markel, Ron Lepper
- Engineered and mixed by Robert Feist
