= The Real Sock Ray Blue! =

Studio album by Mojo Nixon
- Released: March 23, 1999
- Genre: Rock and roll, rockabilly, roots rock
- Label: Shanachie

Mojo Nixon chronology
Gadzooks!!! The Homemade Bootleg (1997)	The Real Sock Ray Blue! (1999)	Mojo Nixon Live at the Casbah December 28, 2003 (2003)

The Real Sock Ray Blue! is an album by the American musician Mojo Nixon, released on March 23, 1999. Nixon was signed by Shanachie Records, which hoped that he would attract rock listeners to the label. He supported the album with a North American tour.

== Production ==
The album was facetiously subtitled "Texas Prison Field Recordings, Vol. 3"; Nixon considered himself to be a folk musician working in a rock style. He was backed by his band, the Toadliquors. "The Ballad of Country Dick", which borrowed from the folk song "Jesse James", is a tribute to the late musician Country Dick Montana; Nixon had to remove a line that mentioned Mike Curb. "Drunk-Divorced Floozie (The Ballad of Diana Spencer)" ridicules the global grief over the death of Diana Spencer. Nixon's critique of the "Rock n' Roll Hall of Lame" includes an imitation of Bruce Springsteen. "Orenthal James (Was a Mighty Bad Man)" touches on the musical structure of the standard "John Hardy".

== Critical reception ==
Professional ratings
Review scores
Source	Rating
AllMusic	3/5 stars
The Austin Chronicle	3/5 stars
Slug	3/5
Stereo Review	3/5 stars

The Des Moines Register praised "Nixon's vulgar anarchist salvos that capture a true slice of rock 'n' roll by eschewing musical polish." Newsday concluded that "Nixon's strengths are a likable drinking-buddy personality and funny one-liners about masturbation and vomiting... But his limitations persist. He and his venerable Toadliquors can't do much beyond by-the-numbers rockabilly". The Washington Post noted, "The gruff-voiced singer-scold-writer still pens amusing roots-rock rants against modernity and commercialism, but if you've heard three or four such songs, you've heard them all."

The Oregonian called Nixon "one half Howlin' Wolf and one half Henny Youngman". Stereo Review opined that "You Can't Buy Cool" "deflates Madison Avenue as well as anyone has this year." The Chicago Tribune said that "kitschy, redneck mean-spiritedness aside ... Mojo Nixon displays a true love for roots rock." The Austin Chronicle noted, "Although Mojo Nixon often gets written off as a novelty act, this pigeonhole doesn't do justice to his extra-fiery brand of populist vitriol... Citizen Mojo's righteous indignation toward popular culture has only sharpened with time".

== Track listing ==
No.	Title	Length
1.	"I Don't Want No Cybersex"
2.	"The Ballad of Country Dick"
3.	"Drunk-Divorced Floozie (The Ballad of Diana Spencer)"
4.	"U.P.S. My Heart to You"
5.	"Machines Ain't Music / I Got My Mojo Working"
6.	"Disney Is the Enemy"
7.	"Rock n' Roll Hall of Lame"
8.	"I Gotta Crazy Wife"
9.	"You Can't Buy Cool"
10.	"Tankman Blues"
11.	"Orenthal James (Was a Mighty Bad Man)"
12.	"Redneck Rampage"
13.	"When Did I Become My Dad"
