= Iván DeJesús =

Puerto Rican baseball player (born 1953)

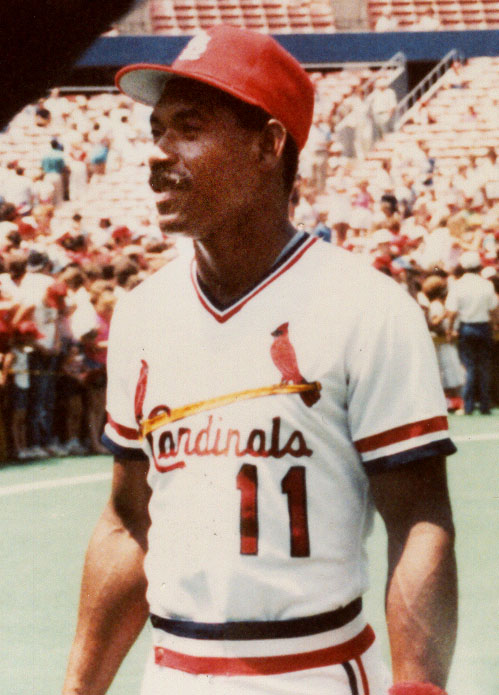
- Shortstop
- Born: January 9, 1953 (age 73); Santurce, Puerto Rico
- Batted: Right Threw: Right

MLB debut
- September 13, 1974, for the Los Angeles Dodgers

Last MLB appearance
- July 15, 1988, for the Detroit Tigers

MLB statistics
- Batting average: .254
- Home runs: 21
- Runs batted in: 324
- Stats at Baseball Reference

Teams
- As player: Los Angeles Dodgers (1974–1976); Chicago Cubs (1977–1981); Philadelphia Phillies (1982–1984); St. Louis Cardinals (1985); New York Yankees (1986); San Francisco Giants (1987); Detroit Tigers (1988); As coach: Chicago Cubs (2010–2011)

Iván Alvarez DeJesús (born January 9, 1953) is a Puerto Rican former professional baseball shortstop and coach, who played in Major League Baseball (MLB) for the Los Angeles Dodgers, Chicago Cubs, Philadelphia Phillies, St. Louis Cardinals, New York Yankees, San Francisco Giants, and Detroit Tigers, for 15 seasons (1974–1988).

== Career ==
DeJesús is noteworthy for being involved in two trades that played significantly in the fortunes of the teams involved. In 1976, he was traded along with Bill Buckner from the Dodgers to the Cubs for Rick Monday. In 1981, he was traded from the Cubs to the Phillies for Ryne Sandberg and Larry Bowa.

In 1977, he had 595 assists, the 5th highest total ever for a shortstop. In 1978 he scored the most runs in the NL, with 104. In 1981 he finished with a .194 batting average, zero home runs, and 13 RBIs garnering the unofficial anti-triple crown for having the lowest number among qualified batters in average, RBI and home runs.

In 1371 games over 15 seasons, DeJesús posted a .254 batting average (1167-for-4602) with 595 runs, 21 home runs, 324 RBI, 194 stolen bases and 466 bases on balls. Defensively, he recorded a .963 fielding percentage.

Since retiring as a player, DeJesús has been coaching and managing in the minor leagues – with the Los Angeles Dodgers organization in 1990–91, Seattle Mariners in 1992, and as a coach with the Houston Astros organization starting in 1994. Since 2001 DeJesús has been a manager with various Astros minor league teams, and received the 2003 Player Development Man of the Year award.

On January 13, 2010, DeJesús was named the Chicago Cubs first-base coach. Previously he worked as a special assistant to Cubs manager Lou Piniella. On August 23, 2010, DeJesús was named the Cubs third-base coach after Mike Quade was named the interim manager of the team. On December 16, 2011, he was not renewed as third base coach for 2012.

In 2012, DeJesús returned to manage the Legends minor league team in Lexington, Kentucky which he had managed in 2004. His son, Iván DeJesús Jr., played for the Boston Red Sox.

== In popular culture ==
DeJesús is mentioned in the Mojo Nixon and Skid Roper song "Where the Hell's My Money", in which Skid takes out his washboard, "winds up like Iván DeJesús" and hits a thieving club owner in the face with it. (Mojo pronounces the ballplayer's name the way it is spelled: "EYE-vun duh-JEE-zuss".)

== See also ==
- List of Major League Baseball players from Puerto Rico
- List of Major League Baseball players to hit for the cycle

Achievements
Preceded by Frank White	Hitting for the cycle April 22, 1980	Succeeded by Fred Lynn
Sporting positions
Preceded by Mike Quade	Chicago Cubs third base coach 2010	Succeeded by Pat Listach
