= Gail Brewer-Giorgio =

American author (1939–2025)

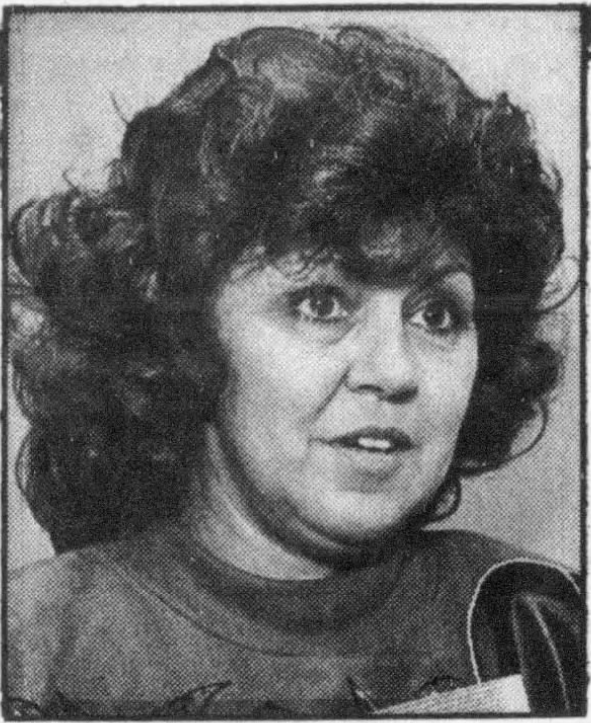
- Born: March 18, 1939
- Died: January 25, 2025 (aged 85)
- Occupations: Novelist and writer

Gail Brewer-Giorgio (March 18, 1939 – January 25, 2025) was an American author best known for perpetuating the conspiracy theory that Elvis Presley may have faked his own death.

In 1978 she published Orion, a novel based loosely on Presley's life but with an ending that involved the main character faking his own death. At the same time, albums began to appear on Sun Records featuring a masked singer named "Orion" with a voice similar to Presley's. The voice was actually that of Jimmy Ellis. Brewer-Giorgio claimed at the time she had no affiliation with these recordings. However, in the 2015 documentary Orion: The Man Who Would Be King, both Ellis and Brewer-Giorgio say that it was all arranged as a stunt in advance.

When the novel Orion fell out of print and did not succeed, Brewer-Giorgio blamed deliberate publisher neglect and interpreted this as a sign that she had gotten "too close to the truth" that Presley may in reality still be alive. She then wrote and self-published a "non-fiction" book about this theory, The Most Incredible Elvis Presley Story Ever Told! She also maintained a following through fan zines of Presley fans who believed he was still alive.

In perpetuating misinformation about Presley, Brewer-Giorgio would often use the "Just Asking Questions" tactic of pseudoskepticism - avoiding direct claims that Presley was alive while instead insisting that his death "raised questions". In reality, Presley's death is easily verifiable as it was witnessed by numerous close friends and family members then extensively documented by Memphis medical personnel, who worked on his body at Baptist Hospital then produced both a death certificate and an autopsy report.

In 1987, a woman named Louise Welling falsely claimed to have seen Presley at a Burger King in Kalamazoo, Michigan. This led to a wave of publicity about the phenomenon of Elvis sightings throughout 1988 in which Brewer-Giorgio appeared widely on television and was interviewed by Larry King, Oprah Winfrey and Geraldo Rivera. Tudor Books soon acquired the rights to The Most Incredible Elvis Presley Story Ever Told! and republished it in a new edition as Is Elvis Alive? This edition of the book came bundled with a cassette purporting to feature a 1980s interview with Presley discussing his life in hiding, interspersed with commentary from Brewer-Giorgio. The recording was in fact narrated by entertainer David Darlock in character as Presley, who later claimed he was commissioned to make the recording by an Elvis fan club and had been misled into thinking it was for a fictional production. Despite this, Is Elvis Alive? was a commercial hit around the world.

In 1991, Brewer-Giorgio appeared in The Elvis Files, an internationally-broadcast TV special hosted by Bill Bixby that claimed to examine the "evidence" that Presley may be still alive, including numerous Elvis sightings. A book of the same name was also published by Brewer-Giorgio. In 1992, a sequel special entitled The Elvis Conspiracy aired which walked back some of the claims from the first and ultimately came to the conclusion Presley was dead. Brewer-Giorgio did not appear in this special, strongly criticised it to her followers and attempted to sue the producers.

For the rest of her lifetime, Brewer-Giorgio kept a relatively low profile. In 1995 she published Footprints in the Sand, a biography of Mary Stevenson who Brewer-Giorgio claims is the author of the "Footprints" poem. She returned to Presley misinformation with her final book, 1998's Elvis Undercover: Is He Alive and Coming Back?

Brewer-Giorgio died on January 25, 2025 in Georgia.

== Published works ==
- Orion (1978)
- The Most Incredible Elvis Presley Story Ever Told (1988)
- Is Elvis Alive? (1990)
- The Elvis Files: Was His Death Faked? (1990)
- Roses to Elvis: Thoughts and Poems of Love from Your Fans (editor) (1992)
- Footprints in the Sand: The Life Story of Mary Stevenson, Author of the Immortal Poem (1995)
- Elvis Undercover: Is He Alive and Coming Back? (1999)
