= Get Out of My Way! =

EP by Mojo Nixon and Skid Roper
- Released: 1986
- Studio: Sound Affair, Santa Ana, California; Hit City West, Los Angeles
- Label: Restless
- Producer: Ron Goudie

Mojo Nixon and Skid Roper chronology
Mojo Nixon and Skid Roper (1985)	Get Out of My Way! (1986)	Frenzy (1986)

Get Out of My Way! is the first extended play by Mojo Nixon and Skid Roper. It was released in 1986 as a vinyl mini-album and cassette on Restless Records. The songs were added to the CD release of the album Frenzy in 1987. "Stuffin' Martha's Muffin" is the same recording as on Frenzy, but a different mix, which most notably filters Nixon's voice during part of the opening monologue to sound like he is on a telephone line; this version replaces the original on the Frenzy CD. "Transylvanian Xmas" is "Joy to the World" performed by Roper on harmonica in a scale reminiscent of horror movie scores, backed by Nixon on bongos. "Jesus at McDonalds" is a re-recording of the song from their first album, Mojo Nixon and Skid Roper.

Professional ratings
Review scores
Source	Rating
AllMusic	3/5 stars

== Track listing ==
All songs written by Mojo Nixon and published by Tallywacker Tunes/La Rana Music [BMI] except as indicated

1. "Get Out Of My Way!" (4:39)
2. "Stuffin' Martha's Muffin" (2:53)
3. "Rutabagas" (1:41)
4. "Burn Down the Malls" (4:50)
5. "Son of Santa" (3:39)
6. "Transylvanian Xmas" (Traditional; arranged by Skid Roper (0:39)
7. "Jesus at McDonalds" (5:16)

== Personnel ==
- Mojo Nixon - vocals, guitar, bongos
- Skid Roper - kick box percussion, washboard, harmonica, bells, tambourine

with:

- Bruce Joyner, Chris Davies, Douglas Farage, Fish Karma, Johnette Napolitano, Paul Kamanski, Peter Webster, Scott A. Reilly - Bigfoot choir
- Allan Waddle, Charley Brown, Dean Naleway, Ilene Markell, Peter Holsapple, Ron Lepper, Scott A. Reilly - Moron Tallywacker Choir

Engineered and mixed by Robert Feist. Recorded at Sound Affair.
"Rutabagas" was engineered by Randy Burns and recorded at Hit City West.
