= The Woman Who Loved Elvis =

1993 television movie by Bill Bixby

- Australian DVD cover
- Genre: Drama
- Based on: Graced Land by Laura Kalpakian
- Written by: Rita Mae Brown
- Directed by: Bill Bixby
- Starring: Roseanne Barr; Tom Arnold
- Music by: William Olvis
- Country of origin: United States
- Original language: English

Production
- Executive producers: Tom Arnold; Roseanne Barr; Joan Barnett; Jack Grossbart
- Producer: Cyrus Yavneh
- Production location: Ottumwa, Iowa
- Cinematography: Ronald M. Lautore
- Editor: Jay Scherberth
- Running time: 91 minutes
- Production company: Grossbart Barnett Productions

Original release
- Network: ABC
- Release: April 18, 1993

The Woman Who Loved Elvis is a 1993 American drama television film, directed by Bill Bixby and written by Rita Mae Brown, based on the 1992 novel Graced Land by Laura Kalpakian. It stars Roseanne Barr and her then-husband Tom Arnold, with Cynthia Gibb, Danielle Harris, and Sally Kirkland. It was filmed in June 1992 in Ottumwa, Iowa, where Arnold was born.

The film tells the story of Joyce Jackson, an Iowan woman who maintains a shrine to Elvis Presley on her front porch, lives on welfare payments with her two daughters Lisa-Marie and Priscilla, and hopes that her estranged husband Jack will one day return. When she is assigned a new case worker, a young woman named Emily Shaw, the two quickly bond and form a relationship that will change both of their lives. Meanwhile, it comes to light that Joyce has been supplementing her welfare payments by selling quilts.

As of 2024, a number of online sources incorrectly list the film's plot as being about Joyce going on a road trip to meet Presley, who she believes is still alive. Nothing like this occurs in the actual film, and Joyce often refers to Presley as having died.

The film aired on ABC on April 18, 1993. It was the final television film directed by Bixby before his death in November 1993.

== Cast ==
- Roseanne Barr as Joyce Jackson
- Cynthia Gibb as Emily Shaw
- Tom Arnold as Jack Jackson
- Danielle Harris as Priscilla Jackson
- Kimberly Dal Santo as Lisa Marie Jackson
- Sally Kirkland as Sandee Sloop
- Joe Guzaldo as Howard Hanson
- Monica McCarthy as Dorrie
- Liz Muckley as Marge Mason
- Dottie Arnold as Old woman
- James Andelin Old man
- Patrick Clear as Ben Wilkes
- Marilyn Dodds Frank as Social worker
- Sam Derence as Surgeon
- W. Earl Brown as Pete
- Albert Flores as Justin
- Jeremy Jones as Jack Jr.
- John Duda as Paperboy
