= Root Hog or Die (album) =

Studio album by Mojo Nixon and Skid Roper
- Released: 1989
- Studios: Sounds Unreel, Memphis, Tennessee
- Genre: Rock
- Label: Enigma
- Producer: Jim Dickinson

Mojo Nixon and Skid Roper chronology
Bo-Day-Shus!!! (1987)	Root Hog or Die (1989)	Unlimited Everything (1990)

Singles from Root Hog or Die
- 1. "Debbie Gibson Is Pregnant with My Two-Headed Love Child" Released: 1989

Root Hog or Die is an album by the American musicians Mojo Nixon and Skid Roper, released in 1989. It was the duo's final studio album. Nixon originally wanted to call it Bush Idiot Slime; he took "root hog or die" from Davy Crockett's autobiography. The duo supported the album with a North American tour. Root Hog or Die sold more than 50,000 copies in its first six months of release.

"Debbie Gibson Is Pregnant with My Two-Headed Love Child" was released as a single; MTV refused to air the accompanying video, which starred Winona Ryder as Gibson. The song peaked at No. 16 on Billboard's Modern Rock Tracks chart. The video for "(619) 239-KING" includes guest appearances from the Beat Farmers, Dead Milkmen, and Kris Kristofferson.

== Production ==
Recorded in Memphis, the album was produced by Jim Dickinson. The producer helped Nixon create a much fuller band sound. Ben Cauley, of the Bar-Kays, played trumpet on the album.

"(619) 239-KING" provides a number for Elvis to call to confirm his aliveness, with the area code located in San Diego. Nixon raps on the cover of Woody Guthrie's "This Land Is Your Land". "Pirate Radio" criticizes the FCC. Nixon considered "High School Football Friday Night" to be less satirical and closer to traditional singer-songwriter material. "Chicken Drop" is about the game of chance.

== Critical reception ==
Professional ratings
Review scores
Source	Rating
AllMusic	4/5 stars
Chicago Tribune	3/4 stars
Robert Christgau	A−
MusicHound Rock: The Essential Album Guide	3/5 stars
The Rolling Stone Album Guide	4/5 stars

Robert Christgau gave Root Hog or Die an A−, deeming it "Nixon's finest artistic achievement." However, he was unimpressed with Roper's cuts, calling them "the usual yawn" and commenting that "Mojo's loyalty to his partner, who has-his-own-album-out God-help-us, is one reason I think he's got a good heart." The Los Angeles Times noted that, "though his lyrics are one continuous snicker, the musical settings betray a true fondness for rock 'n' blues roots," writing that Nixon "plays the part of the junior-high bad boy with enough zest to be endearing, at least to listeners who don't easily take offense at crazed, scatological mockery." The Dallas Morning News stated that the songs "bend and buck with a raucous energy... The music is raw and catchy, filled with sharply picked guitars and smoothly sassy horns."

The Toronto Star considered Nixon "rock's lewd, anarchistic answer to Foghorn Leghorn," writing that several songs are "suitably goofy, lascivious rants." The Calgary Herald labeled the music "some of the funkiest, stripped-down, rock 'n' country 'n' blues around." The Gazette judged the album "drunken, belligerent novelty-store rock, in pursuit of the perfect gag." The Chicago Tribune branded Nixon a "rockin' libertarian, a guy who extols free speech, free thought and free love with equal parts audacity and sincerity."

== Track listing ==
All songs written by Nixon and published by Tallywacker Tunes/La Rana Music except as indicated.

1. "Debbie Gibson Is Pregnant with My Two-Headed Love Child"
2. "(619) 239-KING"
3. "This Land Is Your Land" (Woody Guthrie)
4. "Pirate Radio"
5. "Chicken Drop"
6. "Tennesse Jive" (sic) (Skid Roper)
7. "Louisiana Liplock"
8. "I'm a Wreck"
9. "Legalize It"
10. "Burn Your Money"
11. "Circus Mystery" (Skid Roper)
12. "She's Vibrator Dependent"
13. "High School Football Friday Night"

6 appears only on the cassette and CD releases of the album; 13 appears only on the CD release.

== Personnel ==
- Mojo Nixon - guitar, vocals, wah-wah guitar
- Skid Roper - bongos, choir/chorus, guitar, bass guitar, tambourine, vocals, washboard

with:

- East Memphis Slim - piano
- Phony Joe - organ
- Jim Spake - saxophone
- Ben Cauley - trumpet
- Bertram Brown, Jimmy Crosthwait, William C. Brown III - backing vocals
- Donna Hauth, Susanne Jerome Taylor - jingle singing

Technical

- Carol Tabor - assistant producer
