= Orion (singer) =

American singer (1945–1998)

Jimmy Ellis
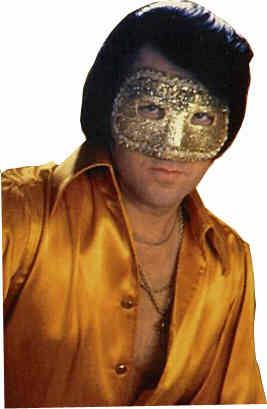
- Ellis as "Orion"

Background information
- Also known as: Jimmy Hodges Ellis; Orion
- Born: James Hughes Bell; February 26, 1945; Pascagoula, Mississippi, U.S.
- Died: December 12, 1998 (aged 53) Selma, Alabama, U.S.
- Genres: Rock; country; rockabilly; gospel
- Occupation: Singer
- Years active: 1962–1998
- Label: Various

James Hodges Ellis (born James Hughes Bell, February 26, 1945 – December 12, 1998), also known as Orion, was an American singer. His voice was similar to Elvis Presley's, a fact which he and his record company played upon, making some believe that some of his recordings were by Presley, or even that Presley had not died in 1977. Ellis appeared with many artists, including Loretta Lynn, Jerry Lee Lewis, Tammy Wynette, Ricky Skaggs, Lee Greenwood, Gary Morris, and the Oak Ridge Boys.

Ellis was shot and killed alongside his employee Elaine Thompson during a robbery at his pawn shop in Orrville, Alabama, on December 12, 1998. Jeffery James Lee was convicted of the murders and executed by the State of Alabama on September 17, 2026.

== Early life ==
Ellis was born on February 26, 1945 in either Pascagoula, Mississippi, Orrville, Alabama, or Washington, D.C. into a single-parent home. According to a friend of Ellis' interviewed in the 2015 documentary Orion: The Man Who Would Be King, Ellis' birth certificate listed his mother as a secretary named Gladys Bell and his father as someone with the given name Vernon and no surname listed. However, this claim is not investigated further in the film and has not been verified elsewhere.

Ellis moved with his mother to Birmingham, Alabama at the age of two, where he was put up for adoption and, aged four, was adopted by R. F. and Mary Faye (nee Hodges) Ellis. He attended Orrville High School, where he excelled in baseball, football and basketball. After winning a state fair competition, his first professional performance was in a Demon's Den nightclub in Albany, Georgia. Ellis entered Middle Georgia College on an athletic scholarship, then transferred to Livingston State University.

== Career ==
At the start of his music career, Ellis sang in nightclubs and, in 1964, released a single, "Don't Count Your Chickens Before They Hatch," for a small Georgia label, Dradco. His vocals closely resembled those of Elvis Presley, and in 1969 Shelby Singleton, who had acquired the rights to Sun Records' back catalog, other than Presley's recordings for the label, released a single of Ellis' recordings of Presley's early songs, "That's All Right (Mama)" and "Blue Moon of Kentucky". The label credited the recordings simply to "?", and it was rumored that they were alternate takes from Presley sessions (despite featuring an electric rather than string bass).

After Presley died in 1977, Singleton revived the hoax by releasing singles that overdubbed Ellis' voice onto known Sun recordings by Jerry Lee Lewis, Carl Perkins and others, including a version of "Save the Last Dance For Me," on which there was simply a credit to "Friend". The records were endorsed as genuine Presley recordings by the song's co-writer Doc Pomus, the music journalist Roy Carr, and the TV show Good Morning America which undertook a voice comparison test of the song against Presley's voice. Around the same time, Ellis released another single under his name, "I'm Not Trying To Be Like Elvis", and an album, By Request — Ellis Sings Elvis.

In 1978, writer Gail Brewer-Giorgio published a novel, Orion, about a leading popular singer – based on Presley – who faked his death. Singleton then persuaded Ellis to start appearing as "Orion", wearing a small mask with dyed hair and in similar clothing to that worn by Presley. His album Reborn, showing the singer emerging from a coffin, was released on gold-colored vinyl on the Sun label in 1978. Some listeners believed that Orion was, in fact, Presley, who had supposedly faked his death. Orion had several hits on the country music chart, including "Am I That Easy to Forget" (1980), "Rockabilly Rebel" (1981), and "Crazy Little Thing Called Love" (1981). He also recorded several albums for Sun between 1979 and 1981 and built up a substantial live following, still wearing his mask.

Ellis tore off his mask at a performance in 1983, saying he would not wear it again. However, after failing to retain his popularity using his real name, he returned to performing as Orion in 1987. He also started to run a store in Selma, Alabama, with his girlfriend Elaine Thompson.

== Murder ==
On December 12, 1998, Jeffery James Lee shot and killed Ellis during a robbery in his store, Jimmy's Pawn Shop. Lee also shot and killed Elaine Thompson, who was Ellis's ex-wife and worked at the shop, and shot employee Helen King, who survived her injuries. The incident was recorded on a security camera system.

In April 2000, Lee was convicted of the murders of Ellis and Thompson, and of the attempted murder of King. The jury recommended Lee be sentenced to life without parole, but the judge sentenced Lee to death, citing overwhelming aggravating factors. On April 15, 2026, Alabama governor Kay Ivey scheduled Lee's execution for June 11 by nitrogen hypoxia. On June 9, Lee's execution was stayed on the grounds of cruel and unusual punishment. On June 11, the day he was to be executed, the U.S. Supreme Court blocked the state from carrying out the nitrogen gas execution after the district court's earlier ruling. Soon after, Attorney General Steve Marshall filed a new motion seeking another execution date for Lee, and requested that Lee be executed by the default method of lethal injection. The motion was approved, and Lee was executed on September 17, 2026.

== Orion: The Man Who Would Be King ==
In 2015, film-maker Jeanie Finlay released a documentary film, after pitching it at Sheffield Doc/Fest's 2013 MeetMarket, about Ellis' life and career, Orion: The Man Who Would Be King. The film won the Discovery Award at the British Independent Film Awards 2015. It was released theatrically in the US by Sundance Selects on December 4, 2015.

== Orion charted singles ==
Year	Song	Peak chart positions
Year	Song	US Country
1979	"Ebony Eyes"/"Honey"	89
1980	"A Stranger in My Place"	69
1980	"Texas Tea"	68
1980	"Am I That Easy to Forget"	65
1981	"Rockabilly Rebel"	63
1981	"Crazy Little Thing Called Love"	79
1981	"Born"	76
1981	"Some You Win, Some You Lose"	83
1982	"Morning, Noon and Night"	69
1982	"Honky Tonk Heaven"	70
