= Tales of the New West =

Studio album by the Beat Farmers
- Released: 1985
- Genre: Country rock, roots rock
- Label: Rhino
- Producer: Steve Berlin, Mark Linett

The Beat Farmers chronology
Tales of the New West (1985)	Glad 'N' Greasy (1986)

Tales of the New West is the debut album by the American band the Beat Farmers, released in 1985. The band signed a one-album deal with Rhino Records. The album peaked at No. 186 on the Billboard 200. It had sold more than 40,000 copies by the end of 1985. An expanded edition of Tales of the New West was reissued in 2004.

The Beat Farmers dismissed the "cowpunk" label, noting their blues, folk, and roadhouse rock influences.

== Production ==
Recorded for $4,000, the album was produced by Steve Berlin and Mark Linett. "Reason to Believe" is a cover of the Bruce Springsteen song. "Never Goin' Back" was written by John Stewart. "There She Goes Again" is a cover of the Lou Reed song. The Kinman brothers provided backing vocals. "Where Do They Go" is about the end of old friendships.

== Critical reception ==
Professional ratings
Review scores
Source	Rating
AllMusic	4.5/5 stars
Robert Christgau	B
MusicHound Rock: The Essential Album Guide	4/5 stars
The Philadelphia Inquirer	3/4 stars

Trouser Press wrote that "the quartet does the '50s-come-'80s neo-country-rock stomp with enthusiasm, economy and not a hint of phoniness or self-consciousness." The Philadelphia Inquirer stated that "the sound is a mix of Creedence Clearwater and Them—rollicking rock-country music with roaring, ragged vocals." Robert Christgau noted that, "like so many roots bands, they write good songs and cover better ones." The Star Tribune listed Tales of the New West as the fifth best album of 1985.

The Gazette concluded that "this amazing, blenderized, junk-food LP consists of equal parts rock 'n' roll, blues, folk, R & B, C & W and humor, put together by four guys and a couple of friends who play music because they're not qualified to do anything else." The Globe and Mail opined that "the 'humorous' tunes—'California Kid' and 'Happy Boy'—aren't funny." The Los Angeles Times determined that "some of the carefree barroom exercises are clumsy, but the best of them give the album an intriguing tension that grows out of the conflict between commitment and independence."

AllMusic labeled the album "a casual masterpiece, a great little record that delivers a fistful of killer tunes and a few laughs with plenty of sweat and not much fuss." In 1995, the St. Louis Post-Dispatch wrote that it "remains one of the '80s cornerstones, a masterful mix of roots-rock influences with taste and restraint, as well as great songs."

== Track listing ==
No.	Title	Length
1.	"Bigger Stones"	2:21
2.	"There She Goes Again"	2:41
3.	"Reason to Believe"	2:35
4.	"Lost Weekend"	2:51
5.	"California Kid"	2:39
6.	"Never Goin' Back"	3:49
7.	"Goldmine"	2:52
8.	"Showbiz"	2:13
9.	"Lonesome Hound"	2:38
10.	"Where Do They Go"	2:57
11.	"Selfish Heart"	2:38
12.	"Happy Boy"	1:20
