= Larry J. Kolb =

Larry Jackson Kolb
- Born: 1953 (age 71–72); Norfolk, Virginia, US
- Occupation: Author, spy, businessman, agent for professional athletes, counterterrorism investigator
- Genre: memoir
- Subject: biography, intelligence officers, CIA, DHS
- Spouse: Kim

Website
- larryjkolb.com/index.html

Larry J. Kolb (born 1953) is the author of two memoirs of his life as an intelligence officer and world-traveling businessman.

Prior to his career as an author, Kolb, by his own account, worked as a close advisor to Muhammad Ali and Adnan Khashoggi and as a spy with CIA co-founder Miles Copeland, Jr., with whom he was involved in intrigues in Pakistan, Iran, the Philippines, Nicaragua, and elsewhere, until Kolb was forced to retire to a safehouse in Florida to avoid extradition to India.

As Kolb recounts in Overworld, his father was a highly placed U.S. intelligence official, and Kolb grew up in various places around the world, following his father's assignments. Kolb resisted various efforts at recruitment by official intelligence agencies until he was recruited by Copeland.

In 1992, Kolb appeared in the Bill Bixby hosted TV special The Elvis Conspiracy after being mistaken for Elvis Presley in a photo of him with Ali and Jesse Jackson in the 1980s. Kolb explained that he is not Presley.

Upon the publication of Overworld, Kolb was again recruited, this time by the Department of Homeland Security, to help investigate two white collar criminals with connections to the CIA. Kolb's investigation of Robert Sensi and Richard Hirschfeld led him to discover and foil a conspiracy to smear the John Kerry 2004 presidential campaign with false links to Al Qaeda. This became the subject of his 2007 book America at Night, which was reviewed by The New York Times on January 25, 2007.

Kolb, who was born in Virginia, currently lives in Florida.

== Bibliography ==
- Overworld: The Life and Times of a Reluctant Spy. NY: Riverhead Books. 2004.
- America At Night : The true story of two rogue CIA operatives, Homeland Security failures, dirty money, and a plot to steal the 2004 U.S. presidential election--by the former intelligence agent who foiled the plan. NY: Riverhead Books. 2007.
- The Unending Game: A Former R&AW Chief's Insights into Espionage. NY: Penguin Books. 2018.
