= Prairie Home Invasion =

Studio album by Jello Biafra & Mojo Nixon
- Released: March 24, 1994
- Recorded: 1994
- Genre: Cowpunk
- Length: 62:00
- Label: Alternative Tentacles
- Producer: Marshall Lawless

Jello Biafra chronology
| Tumor Circus (1991) | Prairie Home Invasion (1994) | Beyond the Valley of the Gift Police (1994) |

Mojo Nixon chronology
| Horny Holidays! (1992) | Prairie Home Invasion (1994) | Live in Las Vegas (Pleasure Barons) (1994) |

Prairie Home Invasion is a collaborative studio album by Jello Biafra and Mojo Nixon, backed by Nixon's backing band the Toadliquors. Released in 1994 by Biafra's record label Alternative Tentacles, the album's lyrics predominantly deal with political themes, as well as criticism of corporate rock and country pop.

== Composition ==
Mojo Nixon's backing band, the Toadliquors, served as the backing band for the recordings. Although Jello Biafra provided most of the lead vocals, AllMusic wrote, "ultimately this is more Nixon's show than Biafra's". The album's music is performed in a honky-tonk cowpunk style. According to Louder, "Mojo Nixon’s musicianship provides Jello free rein to deliver some of his most sardonic derision in the style of the music most at odds with his lyrics."

Half of Prairie Home Invasion consists of covers, including interpretations of public domain folk songs. Many of the album's lyrics tackle political themes. "Love Me, I'm a Liberal" is an updated rewrite of socialist folk singer Phil Ochs' criticism of "fuzzy left-leaners"; these themes, according to AllMusic, show an influence from protest music. "Buy My Snake Oil" criticizes "corporate rock", including emo, alternative rock and Don Henley, a recurring target of Nixon's. Conversely, "Let's Go Burn Ole Nashville Down" criticizes corporate country music and country singers with manufactured images. "Nostalgia for an Age that Never Existed" criticizes the romanticism of the 1950s, the hypocrisy of baby boomers and punk rock. Other topics discussed in the lyrics include deforestation, atomic power, truckers, and "the divine drinking abilities of Jesus Christ." "Will the Fetus be Aborted", sung to the tune of the Christian country folk hymn "Will the Circle Be Unbroken", satirizes the anti-abortion movement. "Atomic Power" is performed in the style of Christian bluegrass.

== Release ==
The album's artwork included Biafra and Nixon staging a parody of Grant Wood's painting "American Gothic," news stories covering "business and government idiocies", advertisements and excerpts from the comic strip "This Modern World" by Tom Tomorrow. The album was released on compact disc, audio cassette and vinyl record in 1994 by Biafra's record label Alternative Tentacles. On August 26, 2022, Alternative Tentacles released a music video for the song "Will The Fetus Be Aborted", in response to the Supreme Court overturning Roe v. Wade, which made the song "hauntingly timely"; the video was directed by Ani Kyd of Sugar Skull Films Inc.

== Reception ==
Professional ratings
Review scores
| Source | Rating |
|---|---|
| AllMusic | 3/5 stars |
| Punknews.org | 3 stars |

In his review for AllMusic, Ned Raggett wrote, "Nixon has the better voice for the proceedings [...] his guitar kicks butt and takes names". Punk News wrote, "when people look back at albums that were as indebted to country as they were alternative rock in the early nineties … this isn’t a release people are going to be bringing up. As good as it is, this album doesn’t compare to the best work by bands like Uncle Tupelo, The Bottle Rockets, or even the albums the Drive-By Truckers would be releasing just a few short years later." Louder called the album "an irreverent cowpunk classic".

== Track listing ==
1. "Buy My Snake Oil" - 9:07
2. "Where Are We Gonna Work (When the Trees Are Gone?)" - 3:12 (Darryl Cherney cover)
3. "Convoy in the Sky" - 3:33 (The Willis Brothers cover)
4. "Atomic Power" - 3:06 (Fred Kirby cover)
5. "Are You Drinking With Me Jesus?" - 3:10 (Lou and Peter Berryman cover)
6. "Love Me, I'm a Liberal" - 4:01 (updated version of Phil Ochs song)
7. "Burgers of Wrath" - 3:51
8. "Nostalgia for an Age That Never Existed" - 4:56
9. "Hamlet Chicken Plant Disaster" - 3:48 (to the tune of "Nebraska" by Bruce Springsteen)
10. "Mascot Mania" - 4:50
11. "Let's Go Burn Ole Nashville Down" - 2:38 (to the tune of "Old Joe Clark")
12. "Will the Fetus Be Aborted?" - 3:42 (to the tune of "Will the Circle Be Unbroken?")
13. "Plastic Jesus" - 4:31 (Ed Rush / George Cromarty)

== Personnel ==
- Sean McCarthy - bass
- Mike "Wild" Middleton - percussion, backing vocals, drums
- Marty Muse - pedal steel
- Ted Roddy - harmonica
- Stuart Sullivan - engineer, mixing
- Marshall Lawless - producer
- Sandra Patyk - backing vocals
- Amy Boone - backing vocals
- Cindy Yates - backing vocals
- Deborah Kelly - backing vocals
- Louis Jay Meyers - banjo
- Danny Barnes - dobro, electric guitar
- Pete Gordon - organ, backing vocals, accordion, piano
- Champ Hood - fiddle
- Evan Johns - guitar
- Don Leady - electric guitar
- Jello Biafra - vocals, photography
- Mojo Nixon - banjo, harmonica, tambourine, vocals, guitar
