= The Beat Farmers =

California alternative country music band

- Origin: San Diego, California, United States
- Genres: Country rock; roots rock; jangle pop
- Years active: 1983–1995
- Labels: Rhino, Curb, Sector 2
- Past members: Country Dick Montana; Jerry Raney; Rolle Dexter Love; Buddy Blue; Joey Harris
- Website: sdam.com/artists/bf/

The Beat Farmers are an American rock band that formed in San Diego, California, United States, in August 1983, and enjoyed a cult following into the early 1990s before the death of drummer and sometime lead singer Country Dick Montana. Their music can be described as an amalgam of jangle pop, roots rock, hard-twang Americana, country rock, rockabilly, and swamp rock. The San Diego Reader summed up their sound as ..."like Bo Diddley, CCR, Joe South, and the Yardbirds, ham fisted into a food processor, stuffed into a shotgun shell, and blasted into a beer keg at three in the morning." As of 2024, remaining members Jerry Raney, Joey Harris, Joel Kmak, and Rollie Love have been performing again in San Diego and throughout the Southwest.

== Formation ==
In 1983, The Beat Farmers were formed by Country Dick Montana, former drummer for San Diego bands The Penetrators and The Crawdaddys, and Jerry Raney, singer and guitarist with The Shames and formerly of 1970s psychedelic band Glory. Singer-guitarist Bernard "Buddy Blue" Seigal and bassist Rolle Love from local rockabilly band The Rockin' Roulettes were recruited to round out the lineup. The band regularly played at the Spring Valley Inn and venues around San Diego State University. In 1984, they won the annual San Diego Battle of the Bands and gained a Southern California following.

The Beat Farmers were born out of an earlier band formed by Dan McLain called Country Dick & the Snuggle Bunnies. That band included many San Diego musicians who would later play important roles in both the Beat Farmers and the neo-traditional Country and cow punk scenes. Country Dick & the Snuggle Bunnies were: McLain (aka Country Dick Montana), drums and vocals; Richard Banke (aka Skid Roper), mandolin, washboard and vocals; Robin Jackson, guitar and vocals; Paul Kamanski, guitar and vocals; Joey Harris, guitar and vocals; and Nino Del Pesco, bass and vocals.

Harris later replaced Buddy Blue in The Beat Farmers, Kamanski penned a number of Beat Farmer songs, Banke teamed up with Mojo Nixon, and Del Pesco later formed The Lonesome Strangers with bandmates Randy Weeks, Jeff Rymes, and Joe Nanini and Snake Farm with Barry McBride of The Plugz.

== History ==
In 1984, they were signed to a one-off record deal with Rhino Records. The first album, Tales of the New West, was produced by Blasters and Los Lobos saxophonist Steve Berlin and released in January 1985. The album included cover songs "Reason to Believe" by Bruce Springsteen, "There She Goes Again" by the Velvet Underground, and "Never Going Back" by John Stewart. It also featured their most well known song, "Happy Boy", which gained national exposure through the Doctor Demento radio show, and was played as a novelty song across the country, notably by disc jockeys Jim McInnes and Pat Martin on San Diego radio station KGB-FM, on Pittsburgh station WDVE, where it has been played weekly since the 1980s, and in the early 1980s on San Francisco, California, FM radio station KQAK aka The Quake FM 99, particularly on the morning show with DJ Alex Bennett (the Quake closed its doors on June 18, 1985).

In 1985, they traveled to England to record Glad 'N' Greasy, a six-song EP for Demon Records. It was co-produced by Graham Parker and the Rumour keyboardist Bob Andrews and included a version by Buddy Blue of Neil Young's "Powderfinger" and Country Dick singing "Beat Generation" with backing vocals from Dave Alvin, Nick Lowe, Gene Taylor, Dan Stuart, and Loudon Wainwright III. Their month-long tour of England drew praise from critics, particularly from Melody Maker, whose editor followed them around and subsequently compared them to the Beatles.

In 1986, the band continued to tour and signed a seven-record deal with Curb Records. Fed up by working with Curb Records, Buddy Blue left the band. Their major-label debut Van Go was produced by Craig Leon and featured performances by both Blue and new member Joey Harris, who previously played with John Stewart, the Speedsters, and Country Dick and the Snuggle Bunnies.

The next year, The Pursuit of Happiness was released on Curb Records/MCA. The single "Make It Last" was briefly played on dozens of country-western stations across the nation, but the rest of the album was too rock n' roll-oriented for the format, and the single was dropped from rotation. "Hideaway" was featured in the soundtrack to the film Major League and "Big Big Man" was featured in The Garbage Pail Kids Movie. Poor & Famous was released in 1989, and included "King of Sleaze", a collaboration by Montana and Mojo Nixon. Later in the year, Montana and Harris formed a side project with Nixon and Alvin called the Pleasure Barons, a group that specialized in lounge music. The Beat Farmers finished the year with a three-night stand at San Diego's Bacchanal nightclub. The album Loud and Plowed and . . . LIVE!! was culled from those three nights and released the next year.

In 1991 Montana was treated for a thyroid condition and continued to visit a doctor for cancer treatments. The band appeared on Late Night with David Letterman on Friday, June 14, 1991, on NBC.

Over the years, the band grew increasingly dissatisfied with its relationship with Curb Records, and repeatedly attempted to get out of their seven-album contract. Finally succeeding in 1993, the group began to record Viking Lullabys in Vancouver, British Columbia, Canada. It was released in August 1994 by Sector 2, an Austin, Texas, record label. In 1995, Curb/MCA released The Best of the Beat Farmers without the consent or involvement of the band. That same year, the Beat Farmers released Manifold, their second record for Sector 2. Paul Kamanski, who wrote several songs on previous Beat Farmers releases, appeared on vocals and guitar.

== Death of Country Dick Montana ==
On November 8, 1995, Country Dick Montana died of a heart attack while performing "The Girl I Almost Married", three songs into the set at the Longhorn Saloon in Whistler, British Columbia. The remaining Beat Farmers decided to dissolve the band three days later.

In 1996, Bar None Records of Hoboken, New Jersey, posthumously released The Devil Lied to Me, the Country Dick Montana solo album. The performers included members of the Farmers, Katy Moffatt, Rosie Flores, Mojo Nixon, and Dave Alvin.

== Later activity post-Country Dick ==
In 2002, Rhino Records digitally remastered and reissued the first CD release of Glad n' Greasy, now subtitled "The Lost Beat Farmers Recording", and an extended version of Tales of the New West.

The remaining members formed several new bands including Raney-Blue (Jerry Raney and Buddy Blue), Powerthud (Jerry Raney and Joey Harris), the Joey Show (Joey Harris), Joey Harris and the Mentals, the Flying Putos (Jerry Raney, Buddy Blue, & Rolle Love), and the Farmers (Jerry Raney, Rolle Love and Buddy Blue).

On April 2, 2006, Buddy Blue died of a heart attack at his La Mesa home at the age of 48. Also that year, a live recording of an early show was released as The Beat Farmers Live at the Spring Valley Inn, 1983 on Clarence Records.

In January 2010, the Beat Farmers started a tradition of an annual Hootenanny that features Jerry Raney, Joey Harris and Rollie Love getting together to play Beat Farmers songs. These are held at the Belly Up Tavern in Solana Beach, California. The show typically features Raney (playing with his band, the Farmers), Harris (playing with his band, Joey Harris and the Mentals) as well as the Beat Farmers with Love (and Joel Kmak on drums). There is typically a number of special guests as well. These have included Dave Alvin, Steve Berlin, Mojo Nixon, Paul Kamanski and others as they pay tribute to Country Dick Montana and Buddy Blue.

On Feb. 26, 2022, the Beat Farmers (Raney, Harris, Love, Kmak) performed on the Outlaw Country Cruise. They performed two other sets (Feb. 27 and March 2) as well as joining the Warner Hodges Band (ex-Jason and the Scorchers) for a jam session. The Beat Farmers will be on the West Coast version of the Outlaw Country Cruise in 2022.

== Band members ==
- Country Dick Montana (Dan McLain) (drums, vocals, guitar) 1983 to 1995
- Jerry Raney (guitar, vocals, drums) 1983 to 1995
- Rolle Dexter Love (bass) 1983 to 1995
- Buddy Blue (Bernard Seigal) (guitar, vocals, drums) 1983 to 1986
- Joey Harris (guitar, vocals) 1986 to 1995

== Partial discography ==
All U.S. releases unless otherwise noted

=== Albums ===
- Tales of the New West (Rhino / 1985) also released by: Canada / Rhino Records, England / Demon Records
  - Tales of the New West - Deluxe Edition (Rhino Handmade / 2004)
- Van Go (Curb /1986) also released by: Germany, Netherlands, France / Curb Records, England / MCA Records, Belgium / Ariloa Benelux. Reissued by Curb in 1991.
- The Pursuit of Happiness (Curb /1987) also released by: Germany, Europe, Scandinavia / Curb Records, Canada / MCA Records
- Poor & Famous (Curb /1989) also released by: Scandinavia / Sonet Records, Canada / MCA-Curb Records,
- Viking Lullabys (Sector 2 / 1994)
- Manifold (Sector 2 / 1995)

=== Singles and EPs ===
- Bigger Stones / Lonesome Hound (Rhino RNOR 021 / 1985)
- Bigger Stones / Goldmine (Demon 1031 / 1985) England-only release
- Glad 'N' Greasy (Rhino / 1986) also released by: England / Demon Records. Reissued in 2000: England / Edsel Records
- Riverside / Riverside (Curb L33-17127 / 1986) Promo only 12-inch
- Riverside / Powderfinger (Curb INT 112.731 / 1986) Germany-only release
- Powderfinger / Big Ugly Wheels (MCA 1067 / 1986) England-only release
- Powderfinger / Big Ugly Wheels, Gun Sale at the Church (MCAT 1067 / 1986) 12" England only release
- Riverside / Deceiver, Powderfinger (Curb INT 112.731 / 1986) 12" Germany only release
- Dark Light / Dark Light (Curb L33-17356 / 1987) Promo only 12”
- Key To The World / Key To The World, Make It Last (Curb L33-17457 / 1987) Promo only 12”
- Make It Last / Make It Last (MCA-53115 / 1987) Promo only blue vinyl
- Hollywood Hills / Hollywood Hills (Curb L33-17041 / 1987) Promo only 12”
- Hollywood Hills / Ridin' (Curb INT 112.733 / 1987) Germany only release
- Hollywood Hills / Ridin', Dark Light (Curb INT 112.733 / 1987) Germany only release - Black, Green or Yellow vinyl
- The Girl I Almost Married / The Girl I Almost Married (Curb L33-17906 / 1989) Promo only 12”

=== Promotional samplers ===
- Gutter Ball, Vol. I (self-distributed, 1987) 10-song cassette available at live shows
- Beat Farmers Sampler (Curb / 1991) promo only eight-song cassette compilation in custom oversize packaging

=== Soundtracks ===
- Rad (Curb, 1986) includes: Riverside
- Garbage Pail Kids (Curb, 1987) includes: Key To The World, Big Big Man
- Teen Wolf Too (Curb, 1987) includes: Deceiver
- Major League (Curb, 1989) includes: Hideaway
- Baby's Liquored Up! (Redneck Rampage video game)
- Gettin Drunk (Redneck Rampage video game)

=== Live albums and compilations ===
- Loud and Plowed and . . . LIVE!! (Curb, 1990) also released by: Europe / Warner Strategic Marketing
- Best of the Beat Farmers (Curb, 1995)
- Live at the Spring Valley Inn, 1983 (Clarence, 2003)
- Heading North 53 N° 8° E: Live In Bremen (MIG Music, 2016)
- Live From London (The Store For Music Ltd, 2016)

=== Appearances ===
- 91X Local Heroes 1984 (no label, issued by San Diego radio station 91X (XETRA-FM), 1984) includes: Lost Weekend/Happy Boy (live)
- Homegrown ‘84 (KGB Records, 1984, issued by San Diego radio station KGB-FM 101) includes: You Lost a Gold Mine
- Tapeworm (NME, 1986) includes: Reason To Believe - free with copy of British music paper, New Musical Express
- Reason To Believe (Rhino, 1986) includes: Reason To Believe
- The Album Network CD Tune Up #7 (Album Network, 1987) includes: Hollywood Hills
- Back Home (CGD 30 COM 20628, 1987) includes: Powderfinger - Italy only release
- Songs From the Boss (Dover ADD3, 1988) includes: Reason To Believe - England only release
- Spin Sampler (MCA, 1989) includes: Girl I Almost Married - free with copy of Spin
- Selected Highlights From Our January '91 Releases (Rhino, 1991) - includes Glad 'N' Greasy & Beat Generation - promotional cassette
- Hit Machine '93 (BMG, 1993) includes: Happy Boy - Australasia only release
- Sexo, Drogas Y Rock 'n' Roll ( Demon Carol CD 002, 1993) includes: Bigger Stones - Spain only release
- The 5th Annual San Diego Music Awards (SLAAM, 1995) includes: That Country Western Song
- Dr. Demento: 25th Anniversary Collection (More Of The Greatest Novelty Records Of All Time) (Rhino, 1995) includes: Happy Boy
- New Country - Interview 1995 (New Country NCFL95D, 1996) includes: Texas Heat
- Cowpunks (Vinyl Junkies, 1996) includes: Country Western Song - England only release
- Americanism (Nectar Masters NTMCD 509, 1996) includes: There She Goes Again - England only release
- Unknown Pleasures (Rare And Classic Tracks From The Archives Of Demon Records) (Uncut, 1998) includes: Powderfinger- free with British magazine, Uncut
- Reason To Believe: A Country Music Tribute to Bruce Springsteen (Warner Special Products, 2004) includes: Reason To Believe
- Chevrolet Legends Volume 1 (Spark Marketing Entertainment, 2007) includes: Blue Chevrolet

== Media occurrences of music ==
- "Happy Boy" is played on Pittsburgh classic rock station WDVE on Fridays around 3:00PM Eastern Time to signal the beginning of the traditional end of the work week. The station began playing the song shortly after the song hit the airwaves.
- WRKI-FM in Brookfield, Connecticut, plays "Happy Boy" (bookended by Todd Rundgren's "Bang The Drum All Day" and Jonathan Edwards' "Shanty") on Fridays around 5:00PM Eastern Time.
- "Happy Boy" was played in the 2003 movie Dumb and Dumberer: When Harry Met Lloyd and the 1998 film Pecker.
- "Happy Boy" is played during the seventh-inning stretch at Alaska Goldpanners of Fairbanks games.
- "Riverside" was played in the 1986 movie Rad. It was also used in a 1986 Budweiser (Anheuser-Busch) radio commercial. Montana also provided the voice-over for the ad.
- "Hideaway" is featured in the soundtrack to the 1989 film Major League.
- "Big Big Man" and "Key to the World" were featured in The Garbage Pail Kids Movie.
- "Baby's Liquored Up" is featured in the film Stag.
- "Deceiver" was featured in Teen Wolf Too.
- "Baby's Liquored Up" and "Gettin' Drunk" were played in the 1997 PC game Redneck Rampage.
- "Big Ugly Wheels" was featured in an episode of the 21 Jumpstreet spin-off Booker.
