= Elvis Is Everywhere =

Single by Mojo Nixon and Skid Roper

from the album Bo-Day-Shus!!!
- B-side: "Gin Guzzlin' Frenzy"
- Released: 1987
- Length: 3:37
- Label: Enigma

"Elvis Is Everywhere" is a 1987 "cult satirical hit" by American musicians Mojo Nixon and Skid Roper. Nixon described the song as "a celebration of Elvis, Elvis-mania, and his fans."

It was released on the August 16, 1987 album Bo-Day-Shus!!!; it was also released as a single. Based on the song's popularity, the album became the pair's first to make national charts. The music video, directed by Bill Henderson, was played in heavy rotation on MTV. The song has been called the duo's most famous song.

== Content ==
Michael J. Fox (left), then-known for his role as a conservative sitcom character, pictured at a 1985 White House dinner with Nancy and President Ronald Reagan. Fox is dubbed "the Anti-Elvis" in the song's lyrics.

The lyrics are a "goofy ode " that depicts Elvis as a "godlike deity". The track begins with a spoken "sermon" that claims "everyone has some Elvis in him/her".

The lyrics link Elvis to supposed "unexplained phenonemona", crediting the singer with the construction of the pyramids, the creation of Stonehenge, and sightings of UFO occupants. Disappearances in the Bermuda Triangle are similarly explained with the thrice-repeated terse assertion that "Elvis needs boats".

The lyrics also mention popular 1980s figures Michael J. Fox, Joan Rivers, and Dr. Spock. Years later, Nixon explained Fox was named "Anti-Elvis" in the song because he "always played a yuppie twit on TV".

Nixon told press: "Elvis seemed to be able to do the coolest thing and the shlockiest thing in the same five minutes and not know the difference. That's what makes him great; That's what makes him the Great American Zen Riddle".

== Reception ==
External videos
- August 17, 1987 performance on Fox's The Late Show

The song was released "as Elvis-mania was peaking in August with the 10th anniversary of Presley’s death". That month, duo performed on Fox's Late Show with new host Arsenio Hall; audience members were provided with paper Elvis masks. Full lyrics of the studio track were published in local papers by August 24.

David Fricke of Rolling Stone suggested the track "could be the best song released by anyone this year." American music journalist Robert Christgau appreciated "Elvis is Everywhere," comparing it to the music of Phil Ochs.

After Presley's death in 1977, "Elvis sightings" from people claiming to have seen him alive became a phenomenon both as an ironic meme and also as part of a genuine belief for some. Amid the song's popularity, Nixon installed a 'hotline' where callers could report Elvis sightings. Robert Michael Pyle wrote about the song his 1995 memoir Where Bigfoot Walks: Crossing the Dark Divide. Pyle recalled Nixon comparing the two tabloid topics by saying "I figure a lot of these Bigfoot people must be like these Elvis cats... it's not a matter of having both oars in the water. They don't even have boats". The music video was featured in the 1987 Ben Stiller short "Elvis Stories", a 30-minute spoof of tabloid reporting on the singer.

In 2009, professor of American Studies Jeffrey Melnick discussed the song, writing: "Elvis may not have built the pyramids... but what Mojo Nixon was getting at was how Elvis had come to be the 'answer' to so many substantial questions about race, sexuality, and region, for instance on the American scene. Even, or especially, after his death." In 2019, Melnick argued the song "at once insists upon and undercuts the power of the star's cultural presence." Scholar June Michele Pulliam discussed the song in her 2021 book Listen to Punk Rock!: Exploring a Musical Genre.

Gregory L. Reece, a scholar of pop culture and religion, wrote in his 2006 book Elvis Religion: "By the time Mojo Nixon is finished proclaiming that 'Elvis is Everywhere' I for one want to be a believer. I want to answer the altar call... It is as if the saving grace of Elvis not only shines through the irony, but, indeed, shines because of the irony."
