= Bo-Day-Shus!!! =

Studio album by Mojo Nixon and Skid Roper
- Released: 1987
- Studios: George Tobin, Hollywood, California
- Genre: Rock
- Label: Enigma
- Producer: Ron Goudie

Mojo Nixon and Skid Roper chronology
Frenzy (1986)	Bo-Day-Shus!!! (1987)	Root Hog Or Die (1989)

Bo-Day-Shus!!! is the third album by Mojo Nixon and Skid Roper, released in 1987. It contains the song "Elvis Is Everywhere", which became an MTV hit.

The album peaked at No. 189 on the Billboard 200.

== Production ==
Skid Roper wrote and sang two songs on the album, "The Polka Polka" and "Lincoln Logs."

== Critical reception ==
Professional ratings
Review scores
Source	Rating
AllMusic	4.5/5 stars
Robert Christgau	B+
MusicHound Rock: The Essential Album Guide	3/5 stars
The Rolling Stone Album Guide	2.5/5 stars

Kiernan McCarthy of AllMusic praised the album's humor, writing that "not every joke Mojo Nixon lets fly on Bo-Day-Shus!!! is a knee-slapper, but one cannot deny his persistence. If you don't like the first quip, he might catch you on the second one, or the tenth." He specifically referred to "Elvis is Everywhere" and "I Ain't Gonna Piss In No Jar" as the best examples of this. Robert Christgau also appreciated "Elvis is Everywhere," comparing it to the music of Phil Ochs, but was critical of several of the other tracks, especially Roper's contribution "Lincoln Logs." Trouser Press called the album "a hoot," and praised the "epic" "Elvis is Everywhere." The Rough Guide to Rock called it "shambling and sweet-tempered." PopMatters wrote: "Two decades later, Bo-Day-Shus!!! stands as the ultimate musical document of America's '80s love affair with redneck culture."

== Track listing ==
All songs written by Mojo Nixon and published by Tallywacker Tunes/La Rana Music except as indicated.

1. "Elvis Is Everywhere"
2. "We Gotta Have More Soul!"
3. "I Ain't Gonna Piss in No Jar"
4. "The Polka Polka" (Skid Roper)
5. "I'm Gonna Dig Up Howlin' Wolf"
6. "The Story of One Chord" [*]
7. "Gin Guzzlin' Frenzy"
8. "B.B.Q. U.S.A."
9. "Positively Bodies Parking Lot"
10. "Wash No Dishes No More"
11. "Lincoln Logs" (Skid Roper)
12. "Wide Open"
13. "Don't Want No Foo-Foo Haircut on My Head" [*]

[*] Bonus tracks on CD and cassette releases.

== Personnel ==
- The Dinkleberry Singers:
  - Country Dick Montana
  - David Farage
  - Sam Chammas
  - Carmaig de Forest
  - Ken Layne
  - Douglas Farage
  - Rick Wilkins
  - Irene Liberatore
  - Mike Martt
  - Pat Craig
- Golden Harmonies by the Pink Expectations: Caren Abrams and Jane Robson
- Sweet Soul Horns by Jim Martone and Leif Cole
- Hammond B-3 organ by Mighty Joe Longa
- Slide guitar by Mike Martt
- Recorded and mixed by Robert Feist
- Assisted by Bryan Rutter, John Kliner, John Kerns and Mark Paladino
- Recorded and mixed at George Tobin Studio, North Hollywood
- Additional recording at The Edge in Los Angeles and Sunswept Studio in Studio City
- Photos: $cott Ambrose Reilly
- Mastered at Capitol by Eddy Schreyer
- Art direction by Patrick Pending
- Cover painting by Patrick Dillon
