= Laura Kalpakian =

American author (born 1945)

Laura Anne Kalpakian (born June 28, 1945) is an American author. She has also published under the pen names Juliet Fitzgerald and Carenna Jane Greye. She is known for her work in the memoir genre.

== Life and career ==
Kalpakian was born in Long Beach, California, the daughter of Peggy (Kalpakian), a secretary, and William Johnson, a technical representative. She grew up in southern California. She earned her undergraduate degree from University of California, Riverside in 1967. After starting her career as a social worker, she earned a master's degree from the University of Delaware in 1970. She earned a Ph.D. in literature from the University of California, San Diego in 1977.

She has received funding from the National Endowment of the Arts and has won a Pushcart Prize, the Pacific Northwest Booksellers Association Award, and the first Anahid Literary Award for an American writer of Armenian descent.

Kalpakian's 1992 novel Graced Land was adapted into the TV movie The Woman Who Loved Elvis, directed by Bill Bixby and starring Roseanne Barr and Tom Arnold.

Her sons are composer Bear McCreary and singer/musician Brendan McCreary.

== Selected works ==
As Laura Kalpakian

- The Great Pretenders (Penguin Group, 2019), ISBN 9781101990186
- American Cookery (St. Martin's Griffin, 2007)
- The Memoir Club (St. Martin's Griffin, 2005)
- Educating Waverly (William Morrow, 2002)
- The Delinquent Virgin (Graywolf Press, 1999)
- Steps and Exes: a novel of family (Bard, 1999)
- Caveat (John F. Blair, 1998)
- Cosette: the sequel to Les Misérables (HarperCollins, 1995)
- Graced Land (Grove Weidenfeld, 1992)
- Dark Continent and Other Stories (Viking, 1989)
- Crescendo (Random House, 1987)
- The Swallow Inheritance (Headline, 1987)
- Fair Augusto and Other Stories (Graywolf Press, 1986)
- These Latter Days (Times Books, 1985)
- Beggars and Choosers (Little, Brown, 1978)

As Juliet Jackson

- Belle Haven (Viking, 1990)

As Carenna Jane Greye

- Tiger Hill (Piatkus Books, 1985)
