= Bernard Seigal =

- Also known as: Buddy Blue
- Born: December 30, 1957
- Origin: Syracuse, New York, U.S.
- Died: 2 April 2006 (aged 48) La Mesa, California, U.S.
- Genres: Rock and roll, rockabilly
- Occupations: Musician, music critic, writer
- Instrument: Guitar
- Years active: 1975–2006
- Labels: Rhino
- Formerly of: The Beat Farmers
- Website: www.buddyblue.com

Bernard R. "Buddy Blue" Seigal (December 30, 1957 – April 2, 2006) was an American musician, music critic and writer, who performed and often wrote under his stage name Buddy Blue. He was a founding member of The Beat Farmers, a Southern California rock band that blended country roots music and rock 'n' roll. As a music critic, he was known for his straightforward style of critique that often used colorful language and original metaphors to either praise or lambaste musicians whom Seigal liked or disliked.

== Early life and education ==
Born in Syracuse, New York, Seigal moved to San Diego in 1973 and played in several unknown bands while working as a clerk at a record store and attending community college. In 1979, he joined the Grossmont College student newspaper as a writer and was later promoted to editor.

== Career ==
=== Music ===
In 1981, Seigal, a singer and guitarist, formed the rockabilly band the Rockin' Roulettes.

In 1983, he quit the Roulettes after he was invited to join the Beat Farmers with Jerry Raney and Country Dick Montana. He took musician Rolle Love with him. The Beat Farmers eventually signed with Rhino records and became known regionally and nationally with their performances of songs such as "Happy Boy", "Riverside" and "Gun Sale at the Church".

Seigal left the Beat Farmers after three years, in 1986, to start a new band, The Jacks. The Jacks recorded one album for Rounder Records, Jacks Are Wild in 1988. A year later, he was hired as a music critic for the San Diego Reader. He would later be fired from the paper when his editors suggested he write negative reviews about local musicians whom Seigal felt did not deserve bad press.

Recording as Buddy Blue, Seigal began performing again in 1991. He released the album/CD Guttersnipes 'n' Zealots in 1991, which included vocals from Southern California rockers Dave Alvin and Mojo Nixon. It featured the songs "Duke of J Street," "Someone You Knew," and "Gun Sale at the Church." The albums/CDs Dive Bar Casanovas (1994), Greasy Jass (1997), Dipsomania! (1999), Pretend It's Okay (2001, which included a guest spot from Chris Gaffney), and Sordid Lives (2003) followed. All were recorded by either Buddy Blue or the Buddy Blue Band.

Throughout his musical career, Seigal performed jump blues, a form of jazzy blues focused on uptempo rhythms and loud, boisterous vocals.

Seigal's impact on the San Diego music scene was diverse. As a critic, he promoted those who he thought were worthy and viciously degraded musicians who he perceived as faking it or contrived. As a musician, he proliferated different styles of jazz and blues and periods in his bands often gave performers a crash course in tight songs and sets and exposed them to myriad musical styles and canvasses. Shortly before his death, Seigal reunited with Jerry Raney and Rolle Love of the Beat Farmers, along with drummer Joel 'Bongo' Kmak as 'The Flying Putos' at local venues, but started using 'The Farmers' when they decided to record an album together (circa 2005). (Country Dick Montana died onstage of an aneurysm back in 1995) playing shows as The Farmers. He had previously played in Raney-Blue (circa 1996) but left when the band became Powerthud.

=== Writing ===
Seigal was a champion of underground comics from the 1960s and 1970s, writing about them for the Los Angeles Times and other newspapers.

By 1990, Seigal's irreverent style of writing led him to writing assignments with a variety of Southern California newspapers, including The San Diego Union-Tribune, Los Angeles Times, The Orange County Weekly, San Jose Mercury News and a full-time writing position with the weekly La Jolla Light At the time of Seigal's death, he had been writing for several years for the OC Weekly alternative paper. He also wrote for a national magazine, Video Store Magazine, a trade magazine for the home video business.

In March 2002, The Union-Tribune issued a memo to its staff stating that one of Seigal's articles, which had run in the paper, used words like "old fart," "love turnips", "rat bastids", "crapola" and "pooh-butts" that were deemed unsuitable for readers. Seigal was known as the Lovable Curmudgeon during his days writing weekly articles called “Blue Notes” that ran each Thursday in the Night & Day section in the Thursday edition of the San Diego Union-Tribune.

== Death ==
Seigal died of a heart attack on an early Sunday morning April 2, 2006 at age 48. Siegal's last performance was with Jerry Raney at a favorite watering hole in La Mesa, California called 'The Parkway Bar' on March 25, 2006.

In January 2012, the Buddy Blue Reunion Band, which included all of the original members, played at the Belly Up venue in San Diego in remembrance of Seigal.
