= Mojo Nixon and Skid Roper (album) =

Studio album by Mojo Nixon and Skid Roper
- Released: 1985
- Recorded: 1985
- Studio: The Bungalow, Coronado, California; Soundtrax, San Diego, California
- Genre: Rock
- Label: Enigma
- Producer: Ron Goudie

Mojo Nixon and Skid Roper chronology
Mojo Nixon and Skid Roper (1985)	Get Out of My Way! (1986)

Professional ratings
Review scores
Source	Rating
AllMusic	3/5 stars
Robert Christgau	C+
MusicHound Rock: The Essential Album Guide	2/5 stars
The Rolling Stone Album Guide	1.5/5 stars

Mojo Nixon and Skid Roper is the debut album of Mojo Nixon and Skid Roper, released in 1985.

== Production ==
The released album had served as the duo's demo tape.

== Critical reception ==
Trouser Press called the album "a bit on the tame side — songs with titles like 'Jesus at McDonalds' and 'Art Fag Shuffle' should be great, but are merely clever."

== Track listing ==
All tracks composed by Mojo Nixon; except where indicated

1. "Jesus at McDonalds"
2. "Mushroom Maniac"
3. "Moanin' with Your Mama"
4. "Promised Land Tonight"
5. "Guns to My Head"
6. "I'm in Love with Your Girlfriend"
7. "Rockin' Religion"
8. "Big Payback" (Bruce Springsteen)
9. "Comin' Down"
10. "Mama Possums"
11. "King of the Couch"
12. "Art Fag Shuffle"
13. "Black Yo' Eye"
14. "Ain't Got Nobody" [cassette only]
15. "Death Row Blues" [cassette only]

== Personnel ==
- Skid Roper - upright washboard and other stuff
- Mojo Nixon - vocals, guitar and foot percussion

Technical

- Recorded at The Bungalow, Coronado, Calif., except "Rockin' Religion" and "Black Yo' Eye", recorded at Soundtrax, S.D. Calif.
- Produced by Ron Goudie
- Mixed at Hit Single Below a Shopping Center
- Photography by Jeff de Rose
- Design by Skidmore Grafix
