= Mojo Nixon =

American musician (1957–2024)

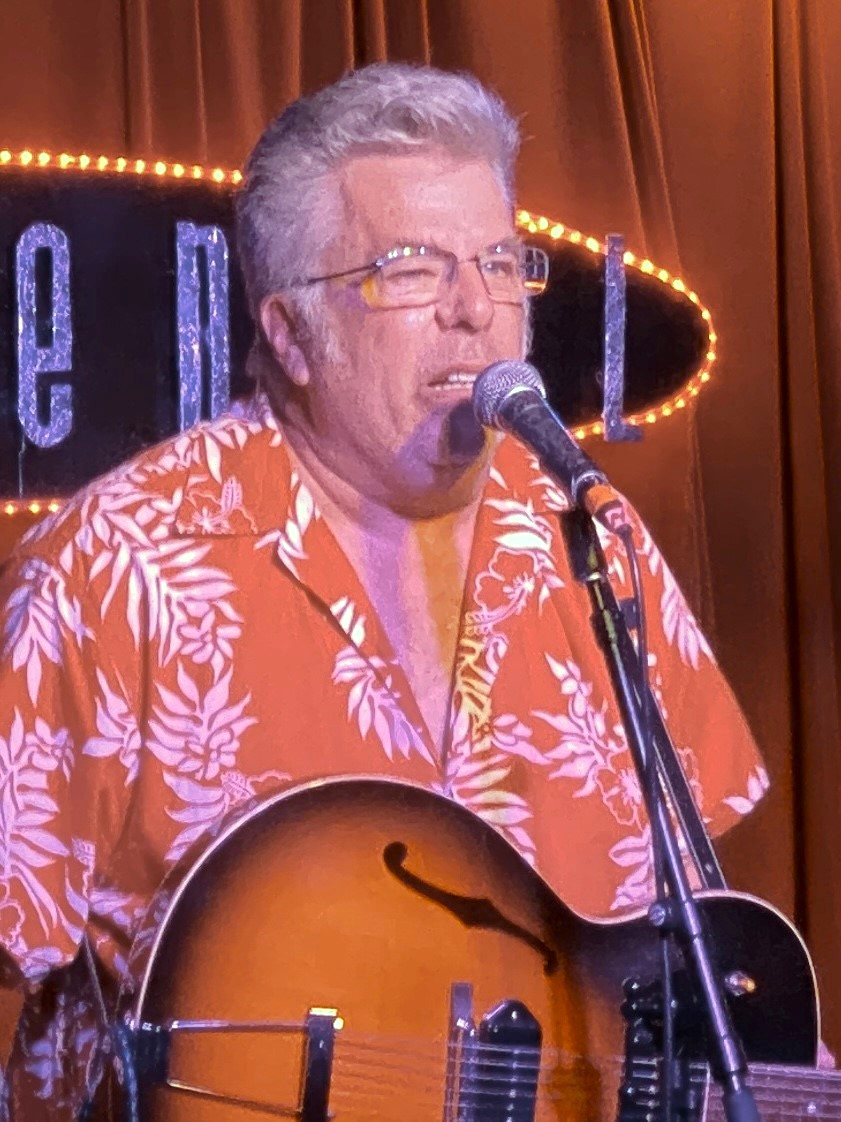
- Nixon performing in 2022

Background information
- Born: Neill Kirby McMillan Jr. August 2, 1957; Chapel Hill, North Carolina, U.S.
- Origin: Danville, Virginia, U.S.
- Died: February 7, 2024 (aged 66) San Juan, Puerto Rico
- Genres: Rockabilly; cowpunk; psychobilly
- Years active: 1985–2024
- Labels: Enigma (1985–1991); Needletime (1997); Shanachie (1999)
- Website: mojonixon.com

Neill Kirby McMillan Jr. (August 2, 1957 – February 7, 2024), known professionally as Mojo Nixon, was an American musician and actor best known for his novelty song "Elvis Is Everywhere", which was an alternative staple on MTV. Nixon hosted The Loon in the Afternoon radio show on the Outlaw Country channel of Sirius XM.

== Early career ==
Neill Kirby McMillan Jr. was born in Chapel Hill, North Carolina, on August 2, 1957. He would later go to high school in Danville, Virginia. He paired with Skid Roper in the early 1980s in San Diego. Roper mostly provided instrumental backup to Nixon's lyrics. Nixon and Roper released their first album in 1985 on Enigma Records, Mojo Nixon and Skid Roper. The song "Jesus at McDonald's" from that album was the duo's first single.

Nixon and Roper's third album, 1987's Bo-Day-Shus!!!, featured the song "Elvis Is Everywhere", a deification of Elvis Presley, which is his best known song (Nixon later declared his personal religious trinity was Presley, Foghorn Leghorn, and Otis Campbell).

Mojo Nixon and Skid Roper were also recorded in San Francisco during these early years by producer Sylvia Massy at CD Presents for the Rat Music For Rat People compilation album.

Throughout the late 1980s, Nixon and Roper produced several satirical pieces lampooning contemporary celebrities, such as MTV VJ Martha Quinn, in "Stuffin' Martha's Muffin", and Rick Astley and Debbie Gibson, in "Debbie Gibson Is Pregnant with My Two-Headed Love Child". Nixon appeared in several promotional spots for MTV during this period, but the network's decision not to air the video for "Debbie Gibson Is Pregnant ..." prompted him to sever ties with the network. Meanwhile, Nixon and Roper also lampooned contemporary American culture and social issues in songs such as "I Hate Banks", "Burn Down the Malls", and "The Amazing Bigfoot Diet".

Nixon and Roper parted ways late in 1989. The following year Nixon recorded a solo album on Enigma Records called Otis. On this album, Nixon continued his assault on pop culture, as in the song "Don Henley Must Die", which caused a fresh round of controversy, even to the point of Nixon's record company begging radio stations not to play it. Henley himself was unfazed; on July 31, 1992, at The Hole in the Wall in Austin, Texas, the former Eagle jumped onstage and performed the song with Nixon, causing Nixon to praise Henley as having "balls as big as church bells", as well as to ask, "Is Debbie Gibson here too?"

== Later career ==
Shortly after Otis was released, Enigma Records went bankrupt, which left much of Nixon's early catalog in legal limbo. In the 1990s, Nixon released a handful of albums on several labels with a backup band known as the Toadliquors. These later albums included songs such as "You Can't Kill Me", "Orenthal James (Was a Mighty Bad Man)", and the controversial "Bring Me the Head of David Geffen", which was ultimately released on a B-side collection due to pressure from album distributors. Also among his later work was "Tie My Pecker to My Leg", which featured lyrics about bestiality, incest, and coprophilia.

In the mid-1990s, Nixon collaborated on albums with Jello Biafra (Prairie Home Invasion), Dave Alvin, and members of the Beat Farmers, including Buddy "Blue" Seigal (Live in Las Vegas by the Pleasure Barons). Country Dick Montana of the Beat Farmers, who was a close friend of Nixon's, was eulogized on Nixon's 1999 album, The Real Sock Ray Blue!, after his 1995 death onstage of a heart attack.

Nixon retired from the music business in 2004, playing his last live show on March 20 of that year at the Continental Club in Austin, Texas. In later years, he occasionally performed at special events, as he did to support fellow musician Kinky Friedman's candidacy for Texas governor.

== Acting ==
Nixon made his acting debut as drummer James Van Eaton in the 1989 Jerry Lee Lewis biographical film Great Balls of Fire!. The film starred Dennis Quaid and Winona Ryder, the latter of whom appeared in Nixon's video for "Debbie Gibson Is Pregnant with My Two-Headed Love Child". The B-side to the "Debbie Gibson" song, which was also the subject of a video, was "(619) 239-KING", a follow-up to "Elvis is Everywhere" in which Nixon, responding to then-active rumors that Presley was still alive, invited the singer to call and leave a message on what was, at the time of release, a legitimate telephone number.

The 1990s also saw Nixon appear in a further five films, including Super Mario Bros. (1993) and Car 54, Where Are You? (1994).

In 1997, Nixon voiced the character of Sheriff Lester T. Hobbes, a recurring enemy in the computer game Redneck Rampage. The game's licensed psychobilly soundtrack also features two of his songs. There was even a promotional music video filmed for the game featuring the song.

== DJing and other media ==
In the late 1990s, Nixon worked as a radio disc jockey in San Diego (on KGB-FM) and Cincinnati starting his career in 1998 on WLW before moving to WEBN .

In 1998, he had a short run as an advice columnist with "Life Fixin' with Mojo Nixon". Only two columns were authored, and both ran in the short-lived Peterbelly Magazine. That year he was also the honorary captain of the United States luge team at the 1998 Winter Olympics. In response to this, Nixon invited members of the men's doubles squad to work on a song for the Games: "Luge Team U.S.A.". The song was recorded by Nixon along with members of the Beat Farmers and luger Gordon Sheer playing drums under the band name The Arctic Evel Knievels.

In 2008, he was hosting three shows on Sirius Satellite Radio: The Loon in the Afternoon on Outlaw Country (channel 60), the NASCAR-themed Mojo Nixon's Manifold Destiny on SIRIUSXM NASCAR Radio (channel 90) and the politically themed Lyin' Cocksuckers on Raw Dog Comedy (channel 99). In October 2005, Nixon began appearing on the Sirius Howard 100 channel as the "General Manager". On November 8, 2016, Nixon did his final "Lying Cocksuckers" show, saying he would be back next year with another show on RawDog Comedy on Sirius/XM. Nixon hosted a weekday program on Steven Van Zandt’s Outlaw Country channel on SiriusXM.

=== "Unretired" ===
Nixon's first comeback was in 2006 when he came out of retirement in support of Kinky Friedman's bid to become Governor of Texas. As Nixon said at the time, "If supporting Kinky for governor is what it takes to drag my ass out of retirement, consider my ass dragged."

In October 2009, he announced his "unretirement" on his website with the release of his album Whiskey Rebellion, a collection of previously unreleased tracks he claimed he had found in "an old shoe box full of cassette tapes" under his front porch. To promote the CD, he announced the temporary free downloads of the CD tracks and several of his solo albums (and albums with Skid Roper) on Amazon.com, along with a tour of several Texas locations. In a press release, he stated,

Can't wait for Washington to fix the economy. We must take bold action now. If I make the new album free and my entire catalog free it will stimulate the economy. It might even over-stimulate the economy. History has shown than when people listen to my music, money tends to flow to bartenders, race tracks, late night greasy spoons, bail bondsman, go kart tracks, tractor pulls, football games, peep shows and several black market vices. My music causes itches that it usually takes some money to scratch.

=== The Mojo Manifesto: The Life and Times of Mojo Nixon ===
In 2013, Freedom Records & Films announced that they were producing a documentary film, The Mojo Manifesto, to be released in 2014. The film premiered at the 2022 South By Southwest festival.

On February 21, 2023, Freestyle Digital Media announced that it had acquired worldwide rights to the film, which became available for streaming in March 2023.

== Personal life ==
=== Family ===
Nixon and his wife, Adaire, had two sons.

=== Views ===
Nixon was an outspoken supporter of free file sharing of recordings in MP3 and other formats. In July 2000, he publicly declared his support because he said that he was "not an asshole like Metallica." In October 2009, several of his albums were available free on Amazon.com in MP3 format for a limited time as part of a promotion for his CD Whiskey Rebellion.

Nixon was a self-described "libertarian cynicalist anarchist" and supported Barack Obama in 2012. He was also a member of the Church of the SubGenius.

=== Death ===
Nixon died from a "cardiac event" on February 7, 2024, while aboard the Outlaw Country Cruise (docked in San Juan, Puerto Rico), which he attended as a performer and host; he was 66 years old. Two days later, James Van Eaton, whom he portrayed in Great Balls of Fire!, also died. Among the memorial events held in honor of Nixon was an all-day concert in Austin, Texas, in March 2024 during the South by Southwest festival.

== Discography ==
With Skid Roper

- Mojo Nixon and Skid Roper (1985)
- Get Out of My Way! (1986)
- Frenzy (1986)
- Bo-Day-Shus!!! (1987)
- Root Hog or Die (1989)
- Unlimited Everything (1990)

Solo

- Otis (1990)
- Whereabouts Unknown (1995)
- Gadzooks!!! The Homemade Bootleg (1997)
- Mojo Nixon Live at The Casbah December 28, 2003 (2003) {MP3 Only Release}
- Whiskey Rebellion (2009)

Mojo Nixon and the Toadliquors

- Horny Holidays! (1992)
- Prairie Home Invasion (with Jello Biafra) (1994)
- The Real Sock Ray Blue! (1999)

Other

- Live in Las Vegas (Pleasure Barons) (with the Pleasure Barons) (1994)
- Redneck Rampage Video Game Soundtrack (Interplay/Xatrix Entertainment) (1997)

== Singles ==
Year	Title	Chart position		Album
Year	Title	US Modern Rock	AUS	Album
1987	"Elvis Is Everywhere"	–	98	Bo-Day-Shus!!!
1989	"Debbie Gibson Is Pregnant with My Two-Headed Love Child" (with Skid Roper)	16	–	Root Hog or Die
1990	"Don Henley Must Die"	20	–	Otis

== Filmography ==
- Great Balls of Fire! (1989) – James Van Eaton
- Rock 'n' Roll High School Forever (1990) – Spirit of Rock n' Roll
- Super Mario Bros. (1993) – Toad
- Car 54, Where Are You? (1994) – Sidewalk Preacher
- Raney (1997) – Sneeds Perry
- Die Wholesale (1998)
- Buttcrack (1998) – Preacher Man Bob
- A Four Course Meal (2006) – Bartender
