= Skid Roper =

- Born: Richard Banke; October 19, 1954 (age 71)
- Origin: National City, California, United States
- Genres: Rockabilly; surf; cowpunk; psychobilly; rock; country
- Labels: Enigma (1985–1991); Needletime (1997); Shanachie (1999)

Skid Roper (born Richard Banke, October 19, 1954, in National City, California, United States) is an American musician, most active in the 1980s and early 1990s. He has recorded with several groups including the surf band The Evasions but is best known for his work with Mojo Nixon between 1985 and 1989.

With Nixon, Roper was mainly a percussionist (playing washboard, tambourine, maracas, bongos, et cetera) and also played mandolin, banjo, harmonica and other instruments.

Since parting ways with Nixon in 1989, Roper has released three solo albums. The first two albums had a much stronger country influence and were considerably less raucous than his work with Nixon. Roper also formed a surf band called Skid Roper and the Shadowcasters.

Roper's latest CD, Rock and Roll Part 3, was released in 2010. Ten years in the making, Roper plays the guitar, mandolin, organ, harmonica, percussion and whistling, sings each track and wrote all but one song.

In 2012 Roper contributed new music to volume ten (One Way Ticket to Palookaville) and in 2013 to volume eleven (Hells Basement) of the compilation album series Staring at the Sun. In 2012 Roper became a member of the Hi-Tones, the backing combo for Andy Rasmussen, playing drums and mandolin on the 2013 album High & Lonesome: The Rise and Fall of Hilo.

== Discography ==
Solo

- Trails Plowed Under (1989)
- Lydia's Cafe (1991)
- Rock and Roll Part 3 (2010)

With The Evasions£

- Son of Surf! (1981)

With Mojo Nixon

- Mojo Nixon and Skid Roper (1985)
- Get Out Of My Way! (1986)
- Frenzy (1986)
- Bo-Day-Shus!!! (1987)
- Root Hog Or Die (1989)
- Unlimited Everything (1990)

With Action Andy and the Hi-Tones

- High and Lonesome: The Fall and Rise of Hilo (2013)

== Charting singles ==
Year	Title	Chart position	Album
Year	Title	AUS	Album
1987	"Elvis is Everywhere"	98	Bo-Day-Shus!!!
