= Country Dick Montana =

American musician (1955–1995)

- Born: Daniel Monte McLain; May 11, 1955; Carmel, California, U.S.
- Origin: San Diego, California, U.S.
- Died: November 8, 1995 (aged 40) Whistler, British Columbia, Canada
- Occupation: Musician
- Instruments: Drums, vocals
- Years active: 1983–1995

Daniel Monte McLain (May 11, 1955 – November 8, 1995), known by the stage name Country Dick Montana, was an American musician best known as a member of The Beat Farmers. He was born in Carmel, California. In 1995, It was reported that Montana suffered a heart attack and died while playing "The Girl I Almost Married" during a Beat Farmers show at the Longhorn Saloon in Whistler, British Columbia, Canada. The San Diego Reader (a publication local to the home of the Beat Farmers) reported that the cause of his death was an aneurysm. The band disbanded shortly thereafter.

== Background ==
In the 1970s, Montana owned a record store called Monty Rockers and was a member of two seminal San Diego bands. He drummed for both punk rock pioneers The Penetrators and roots rock band The Crawdaddys.

From 1983 to 1995, Montana played drums, percussion, guitar and accordion for The Beat Farmers with founding member Buddy Blue Siegal. Montana also performed lead vocals on at least one song on every Beat Farmers album, singing humorous songs frequently related to drinking. The song "Happy Boy" was popular on The Dr. Demento Radio Show and featured in several feature films. Montana was also famous for his onstage antics, frequently related to drinking. During this time, he was also in the short-lived trio the Pleasure Barons with Mojo Nixon and Dave Alvin, The Incredible Hayseeds, Country Dick's Petting Zoo, and Country Dick's Garage.

Prior to co-founding the Beat Farmers, Montana put together a band called Country Dick & the Snuggle Bunnies, which included an array of San Diego talent, most of whom would play major roles in the Beat Farmers legacy. The band included: Montana, drums/vocals; Richard Banke (a.k.a. Skid Roper), mandolin/washboard/vocals; Robin Jackson, guitar/vocals; Paul Kamanski, guitar/vocals; Joey Harris, guitar/vocals; and Nino Del Pesco, bass/vocals.

== Legacy ==
"The Ballad of Country Dick" by Mojo Nixon was written after his death.

The song "Happy Boy" was written by Dane Conover, formerly of the Puppies—the band in which Del Pesco played bass prior to joining Country Dick & the Snuggle Bunnies. Conover would later go on to form Trees.

In 1996, the posthumous solo album The Devil Lied to Me was released.

A reference to Montana can be found in the 1997 first-person shooter video game Redneck Rampage. In the game, his "tombstone" appears in a graveyard on the 12th level, complete with the words "the devil lied to me" as his epitaph, which refers to his 1996 posthumous album.
