= Live It Up (David Johansen album) =

Live album by David Johansen
- Released: June 1982
- Recorded: February 4–5, 1982
- Genre: Rock
- Length: 44:58
- Label: Blue Sky
- Producer: Ron Nevison

David Johansen chronology
Here Comes the Night (1981)	Live It Up (1982)	Sweet Revenge (1984)

Live It Up, released in 1982, was recorded over two nights on February 4 and 5, 1982, at the Paradise Theatre (now known as the Paradise Rock Club) in Boston, Massachusetts.

It was the first live album "officially" released by David Johansen as a solo artist. Although Johansen did release a limited and promotional live album, The David Johansen Group Live in 1978, that album was not officially released until 1993. Additionally, by the time Live It Up was released, various Bootleg recordings of Johansen's first band, the New York Dolls, were being heavily traded (an official live album would eventually be released in 1984). The impact of the New York Dolls, as both an influential band and as a live act, was becoming a legend in the late-1970s and early-1980s when Johansen was trying to start his solo career. However, his three previous solo albums were not selling as well as expected, therefore, Johansen turned to touring and selling his stage show.

On Live It Up, Johansen performs the Foundations' song "Build Me Up Buttercup", the Cadets' "Stranded in the Jungle" (which was also covered by the New York Dolls) and an Animals medley, which included "We Gotta Get Out of This Place", "Don't Bring Me Down" and "It's My Life".

The only New York Dolls original recording he performs is "Personality Crisis". The Johansen/Sylvain compositions “Funky but Chic” and “Frenchette”, which appeared on Johansen’s solo debut, had been performed by the band in its last original phase; the former would later be recorded by the reformed Dolls, while Sylvain would release "Frenchette" on his album New York's a Go Go.

The album's cover art was taken during Johansen's performance for MTV's New Year's Eve Rock N' Roll Ball.

== Critical reception ==
Professional ratings
Review scores
Source	Rating
AllMusic	3/5 stars
The Village Voice	A−

In The Boston Phoenix, Milo Miles wrote that the album "was clearly a summation of Johansen’s solo career and a tribute to his fans... Live It Up also remedies Johansen’s chronic lack of solid melodies. Although he has long outgrown his erratic, tuneless vocals on the Dolls’ albums, he still needs help composing compatible tunes."

== Track listing ==
Side one
No.	Title	Writer(s)	Length
1.	"We Gotta Get Out of This Place/Don't Bring Me Down/It's My Life"	Barry Mann, Cynthia Weil/Carole King, Gerry Goffin/Roger Atkins, Carl D'Errico	4:23
2.	"Frenchette"	Johansen, Sylvain Sylvain	4:53
3.	"Reach Out (I'll Be There)"	Holland–Dozier–Holland	3:24
4.	"Is This What I Get for Loving You?"	King, Goffin, Phil Spector	3:14
5.	"Donna"	Johansen	4:25

Side two
No.	Title	Writer(s)	Length
6.	"Build Me Up Buttercup"	Mike d'Abo, Tony Macaulay	2:43
7.	"Melody"	Johansen, Ronnie Guy	3:04
8.	"Funky but Chic"	Johansen, Sylvain	3:51
9.	"Bohemian Love Pad"	Johansen, Sylvain	2:54
10.	"Stranded in the Jungle"	Ernestine Smith, James Johnson	3:56
11.	"Personality Crisis"	Johansen, Johnny Thunders	4:49
Total length:			44:58

== Personnel ==
- David Johansen - vocals
- Steven Paul - director
- Charlie Giordano - keyboards
- Huw Gower - guitar, backing vocals
- Tony Machine - drums, percussion
- Brett Cartwright - bass, backing vocals
- David Nelson - guitar, backing vocals

Technical

- Ron Nevison - producer, engineer
- Kate Simon, David Gahr - photography
