= Buster Poindexter (album) =

1987 album by David Johansen

Studio album by Buster Poindexter
- Released: July 7, 1987
- Length: 40:19
- Label: RCA
- Producer: Hank Medress

Buster Poindexter chronology
Sweet Revenge (1984)	Buster Poindexter (1987)	Buster Goes Berserk (1989)

Professional ratings
Review scores
Source	Rating
Allmusic	link
Rolling Stone	(positive) link
The Village Voice	B+ link

Buster Poindexter is a self-titled album released by RCA Records in 1987 by Buster Poindexter, the alter ego of New York Dolls frontman David Johansen.

Johansen re-recorded the track "Heart of Gold" as Buster Poindexter, which originally appeared on Johansen's 1981 solo album Here Comes the Night. The song "Hot Hot Hot" was a Billboard single and received heavy play on MTV.

== Development of the Buster Poindexter character ==
Around 1982, Johansen began performing under the pseudonym Buster Poindexter in a small club in his neighborhood. He adopted the pseudonym to avoid fans of his music from coming to the shows and asking for his music. The shows grew in popularity, and gradually the original three-piece band with which he performed grew in size to the Banshees of Blue, accompanied by The Uptown Horns. They achieved moderate commercial success, performing jump blues, traditional pop, swing, and novelty songs. Shortly before the album's release, Buster began appearing as part of the house band on the television program Saturday Night Live.

== Track listing ==
Side one
No.	Title	Writer(s)	Length
1.	"Smack Dab in the Middle"	Charles E. Calhoun	3:52
2.	"Bad Boy"	Avon Long, Lil Hardin Armstrong	3:07
3.	"Hot Hot Hot"	Alphonsus Cassell	4:07
4.	"Are You Lonely for Me, Baby?"	Bert Berns	3:38
5.	"Screwy Music"	Fred Rose	3:17

Side two
No.	Title	Writer(s)	Length
6.	"Good Morning Judge"	Louie Innis	3:37
7.	"Oh Me, Oh My (I'm a Fool for You Baby)"	Jim Doris	3:52
8.	"Whadaya Want?"	Jerry Leiber, Mike Stoller	2:44
9.	"House of the Rising Sun"	Traditional	3:40
10.	"Cannibal"	David Johansen, Joe Delia	4:45
11.	"Heart of Gold"	Johansen	4:40
Total length:			40:19

== Personnel ==
Buster Poindexter and His Banshees of Blue

- Buster Poindexter – vocals
- Patti Scialfa – backing vocals
- Crispin Cioe – alto and baritone saxophone
- Joe Delia – organ, piano, horn arrangements
- Bob Funk – trombone
- Tony "Antoine Fats" Garnier – bass
- Carl Hall – backing vocals
- Arno Hecht – tenor saxophone
- "Hollywood" Paul Litteral – trumpet
- Brian Koonin – guitar, banjo, mandolin
- Lisa Lowell – backing vocals
- Tony Machine – drums (third drummer New York Dolls: 1975–1976)
- Soozie Tyrell – violin, backing vocals
- Louise Bethune – backing vocals
- Fred Wolcott – percussion
- Larry Poindexter – accordion

Technical

- John Sheard – associate producer, Synclavier and string arrangements
- Bill Scheniman – engineer, mixing
- Ria Lewerke – art direction
- Ken Nahoum – photography
