= David Johansen (album) =

Studio album by David Johansen
- Released: May 1978
- Recorded: February 1978
- Studio: The Record Plant, New York
- Genre: Rock; hard rock
- Length: 38:16
- Label: Blue Sky; Columbia; Razor & Tie
- Producer: Richard Robinson, David Johansen

David Johansen chronology
David Johansen (1978)	In Style (1979)

Professional ratings
Review scores
Source	Rating
AllMusic	4.5/5 stars
Christgau's Record Guide	A−
The Rolling Stone Album Guide	4/5 stars

David Johansen is a 1978 album by the rock musician David Johansen and his first solo album following his tenure as lead singer of the New York Dolls. The album was released on Blue Sky Records, a sub-label of Columbia Records that was associated with Johnny and Edgar Winter. David Johansen also features fellow New York Doll guitarist Sylvain Sylvain, who was a member of the David Johansen Band at that time. Sylvain co-wrote four of the songs with Johansen. The single from the album was Johansen and Sylvain's "Funky But Chic", backed with "The Rope (The Let Go Song)", which has been included as a bonus track on the CD. David Johansen was voted the tenth best record of 1978 in the Pazz & Jop, an annual poll of American critics published by The Village Voice.

== Track listing ==
All tracks are written by David Johansen & Sylvain Sylvain except as indicated.

Side one
No.	Title	Writer(s)	Length
1.	"Funky But Chic"		3:59
2.	"Girls"		3:37
3.	"Pain in My Heart"	Johansen	3:24
4.	"Not That Much"	Johansen, Buz Verno	3:02
5.	"Donna"	Johansen	4:25

Side two
No.	Title	Writer(s)	Length
6.	"Cool Metro"		3:52
7.	"I'm a Lover"	Johansen, Johnny Ráo, Thomas Trask, Verno	3:37
8.	"Lonely Tenement"	Johansen	4:15
9.	"Frenchette"		5:46
Total length:			38:16

Bonus track exclusive to CD
No.	Title	Writer(s)	Length
10.	"The Rope (The Let Go Song)"	Johansen	2:29

== Personnel ==
- David Johansen – vocals, guitar on "Donna", castanets & chimes on "Frenchette"
- Frankie LaRocka – drums, vocals on "Funky But Chic", "Girls", "Pain in My Heart" and "I'm a Lover"
- Johnny Ráo – guitar
- Thomas Trask – guitar
- Buz Verno – bass, vocals on "Funky But Chic", "Pain in My Heart", "Not That Much", "I'm a Lover" and "Lonely Tenement"

Additional personnel

- Bobby Blain – organ on "Funky But Chic" and "Cool Metro", piano on "Girls", "Donna" and "Frenchette" (second keyboardist for New York Dolls: 1976–77 and formerly of the band Street Punk)
- Stan Bronstein – horn on "Funky But Chic" and "Pain in My Heart"
- Felix Cavaliere – organ on "Pain in My Heart"
- Sarah Dash – vocals on "Funky But Chic"
- Nona Hendryx – vocals on "Funky But Chic"
- Joe Perry – rhythm guitar on "Not That Much", guitar on "Cool Metro"
- Scarlet Rivera – violin on "Donna" and "Lonely Tenement"
- Sylvain Sylvain – guitar on "Cool Metro"
- Tony Machine – percussion on "Funky But Chic" (third drummer for New York Dolls: 1976–77)
- Gene Leppik – additional vocals
- Jimmie Mack – additional vocals

Production

- Richard Robinson – producer
- David Johansen – producer
- David Thoener – engineer
- Steve Paul – direction
- Jay Krugman – assistant engineer
- Gregg Caruso – assistant engineer
- Gray Russell – assistant engineer
- Greg Calbi – mastering
- Elena Pavlov – cover design
- Benno Friedman – cover photography
- Gary Green – back cover photography

== Charts ==
Chart (1978)	Peak position
Australian Albums (Kent Music Report)	91

== Releases ==
- Cassette David Johansen Razor & Tie 1992
- CD David Johansen Razor & Tie 1992
- Cassette David Johansen [Bonus Track] Caroline Distribution 1992
- CD David Johansen American Beat Records 2008
- CD David Johansen Culture Factory 2012
- CD David Johansen Razor & Tie
