= Waiting for the Night (disambiguation) =

"Waiting for the Night" is a 2012 single by Nelly Furtado.

Waiting for the Night may also refer to:

== Music ==
=== Albums ===
- Waitin' for the Night, a 1977 album by The Runaways, or the title song
- Waiting for the Night, a 1993 album by the Freddy Jones Band

=== Songs ===
- "Waiting for the Night", a song by Saxon from their 1986 album Rock the Nations
- "Waiting for the Night", a song by Depeche Mode from their 1990 album Violator
- "Waiting for the Night", a song by Loverboy from their 1997 album Six
- "Waiting for the Night" (Armin van Buuren song), a 2013 song by Armin van Buuren featuring Fiora
- "Waiting for the Night", a cover of the Depeche Mode song by Swedish metal band Ghost from their 2013 album If You Have Ghost

== See also ==
- Waiting for Tonight (disambiguation)
- Wait for the Night, Virgin Steele EP
- Wait for Night, an album by Rick Springfield
