= In Style (David Johansen album) =

Studio album by David Johansen
- Released: 1979
- Studio: The Schoolhouse, Westpoint, Connecticut
- Genre: Rock
- Length: 38:43
- Label: Blue Sky
- Producer: Mick Ronson, David Johansen

David Johansen chronology
David Johansen (1978)	In Style (1979)	Here Comes the Night (1981)

Professional ratings
Review scores
Source	Rating
AllMusic	3.5/5 stars
MusicHound Rock: The Essential Album Guide	3/5 stars
The Rolling Stone Album Guide	3.5/5 stars
The Village Voice	B+

In Style is the second solo album by the American musician David Johansen. It was released in 1979 on Blue Sky Records.

== Background ==
Johansen's self-titled solo debut earned favorable reviews but low sales. Consequently, In Style – featuring more pop-style songs such as "Melody" and "Swaheto Woman" – was designed to be more commercial.

"Swaheto Woman", released as a single, provided Johansen's first disco song. "Swaheto Woman" and three other tracks were cowritten by Johansen's friend and fellow New York Doll, Sylvain Sylvain. “She Knew She was Falling in Love” and “Wreckless Crazy” had both been performed by the Dolls after the departures of Thunders, Nolan and Kane.

In Style features Ian Hunter and Dan Hartman.

Of the closing "Flamingo Road", Johnny Depp remarked: "I think it's about his experience of losing his wife to Steven Tyler, and the words are beautifully written, beautifully executed. The whole record's great. Johansen was doing some great shit back then."

== Track listing ==
All tracks are written by David Johansen. Co-writers as indicated.

Side one
No.	Title	Writer(s)	Length
1.	"Melody"	Ronnie Guy	2:58
2.	"She"	Buz Verno	2:21
3.	"Big City"		4:09
4.	"She Knew She Was Falling in Love"	Sylvain Sylvain	3:46
5.	"Swaheto Woman"	Sylvain	5:05

Side two
No.	Title	Writer(s)	Length
1.	"Justine"		4:34
2.	"In Style"		4:08
3.	"You Touched Me Too"	Ráo	2:23
4.	"Wreckless Crazy"	Sylvain	3:17
5.	"Flamingo Road"	Sylvain	6:02
Total length:			38:43

== Personnel ==
- Mick Ronson – producer, guitar
- David Johansen – keyboards, guitar, vocals, producer
- Stan Bronstein – saxophone
- Ronnie Guy – piano
- Dan Hartman – bass, backing vocals
- Ian Hunter – acoustic piano on "Flamingo Road"
- Frankie LaRocka – drums, backing vocals
- Tom Mandel – organ
- Johnny Ráo – guitar
- Dave Still – engineer, backing vocals
- Sylvain Sylvain – backing vocals
- Gary Green – backing vocals
- Tommy Trask – guitar, backing vocals
- Buz Verno – bass
- Gene Orloff – orchestra conductor on "Melody", arranged by David Johansen and Mick Ronson

Technical

- Harvey Goldberg – engineer
- George Marino – mastering
- Paula Scher – design
- Richard Avedon – cover and sleeve photography
