= Here Comes the Night (David Johansen album) =

Studio album by David Johansen
- Released: 1981
- Studio: Sundragon, New York City
- Genre: Rock
- Length: 35:14
- Label: Blue Sky
- Producer: David Johansen; Blondie Chaplin; Barry Mraz

David Johansen chronology
In Style (1979)	Here Comes the Night (1981)	Live It Up (1982)

Here Comes the Night is an album by the American musician David Johansen. Released in 1981, Blondie Chaplin produced the album (for Blondie Chaplin's writing contributions, his middle name William is used and he is listed as "Bill Chaplin").

The album marks the first time Johansen recorded an album without a significant contribution from his fellow New York Dolls bandmate, Sylvain Sylvain (with the exception of co-writing one song, Sylvain does not appear on the album). Johansen also recruited the third-in-a-row producer for Here Comes the Night in an attempt to identify a unique sound, rather than a continual evolution of the New York Dolls sound. The tracks on the album have more of a contemporary beat, which would continue to be developed into Johansen's alter-ego, Buster Poindexter. The song "Heart of Gold" would later appear on Buster Poindexter's debut album, Buster Poindexter.

== Critical reception ==
Professional ratings
Review scores
Source	Rating
AllMusic	3/5 stars
Robert Christgau	A−
The Rolling Stone Album Guide	2/5 stars

Robert Christgau wrote: "With the help of sideperson extraordinaire Blondie Chaplin, the pater-familias has finally mastered his own fast, vulgar studio-rock style, and this is his best solo, though only we who truly love him will hear it that way."

== Track listing ==
All tracks are written by David Johansen, additional writers noted.

No.	Title	Writer(s)	Length
1.	"She Loves Strangers"	Bill Chaplin	3:03
2.	"Bohemian Love Pad"	Sylvain Sylvain	2:50
3.	"You Fool You"	Chaplin	3:04
4.	"My Obsession"	Chaplin	2:42
5.	"Marquesa de Sade"	Bobby Blain	3:51
6.	"Here Comes the Night"	Chaplin	2:55
7.	"Suspicion"	Chaplin	2:29
8.	"Party Tonight"	Blain, Chaplin	2:54
9.	"Havin' So Much Fun"	Elliott Murphy	3:42
10.	"Rollin' Job"	Chaplin	4:02
11.	"Heart of Gold"		3:42

== Personnel ==
- David Johansen - vocals, producer
- Elliott Murphy - harmonica on "Heart of Gold", rhythm guitar on "Party Tonight"
- Blondie Chaplin - production assistance, guitar, backing vocals
- Bobby Blain - piano (2nd keyboardist of New York Dolls: 1976)
- Ernie Brooks - bass
- Tony Machine - drums (3rd drummer of New York Dolls 1976–77)
- Othello Molineaux - steel drums on "She Loves Strangers"
- Ulysses Delavega - percussion on "Marquesa de Sade"
- Tommy Mandel - organ, keyboards

Technical

- Barry Mraz - producer, engineer
- Kate Simon - photography
