= Waiting for Tonight (disambiguation) =

"Waiting for Tonight" is a 1997 song by 3rd Party and mostly known for its 1999 rendition by Jennifer Lopez.

Waiting for Tonight may also refer to:

- "Waiting for Tonight", a song by Tom Petty from Playback, with backing vocals from The Bangles
- "Waiting for Tonight", a song by Bad Boys Blue from Tonite
- "Waiting for Tonight", a song by Cheryl Burke
- "Waiting for Tonight", a song from Dance Dance Revolution X2
- "Waiting for Tonight", a song by Jimmie Mack, 1978
- "Waiting for Tonight", a song by Snips, 1978
