= Knock Dem Dead =

Studio album by Arrow
- Released: 1988
- Genre: Soca
- Label: Mango
- Producer: Leston Paul

Arrow chronology
| Heavy Energy (1987) | Knock Dem Dead (1988) | O'La Soca (1990) |

Knock Dem Dead is an album by the Montserratian soca musician Arrow, released in 1988. It was Arrow's first album to be widely distributed in the United States. The song "Groove Master" appears on the soundtracks to Casual Sex? and The Mighty Quinn.

== Production ==
The album was produced by Leston Paul. It incorporated more traditional rock elements, with the guitar of Chris Newland featured more prominently. Audio Two guested on the lead track.

== Critical reception ==
Professional ratings
Review scores
| Source | Rating |
|---|---|
| AllMusic | 3/5 stars |
| The Encyclopedia of Popular Music | 4/5 stars |
| MusicHound World: The Essential Album Guide | 5/5 stars |
| The Rolling Stone Album Guide | 3/5 stars |

The Gazette wrote that "there's no escaping Arrow's wicked and distinctive beat, influenced here by everything from Latin rhythms to New York rap." The Boston Globe deemed the album "juiced-up bacchanal music with driving guitar lines, ever-present horn bursts and Arrow's high-energy vocals which show a preacher-like devotion to the dance floor." The Chicago Tribune ranked Knock Dem Dead at number two on its list of the 10 best albums of 1988, writing that it "proved that when it comes to accessible, catchy and joyously rhythmic music, [Arrow] has few equals." The Reggae & African Beat called "Groove Master" Arrow's "masterpiece."

== Track listing ==
| No. | Title | Length |
|---|---|---|
| 1. | "Groove Master" |
| 2. | "More Arrow" |
| 3. | "Rhumba Again" |
| 4. | "Tiny Winy" |
| 5. | "Tell Mama" |
| 6. | "Big Big" |
| 7. | "As You See Me Gimme" |
| 8. | "Dance Dis Dance" |

== Personnel ==
- Arrow – vocals
- Chris Newland – guitar
- Leston Paul – keyboards, production
