= Buster Goes Berserk =

Studio album by Buster Poindexter
- Released: 1989
- Recorded: 1988–1989
- Genre: R&B
- Length: 37:12
- Label: RCA
- Producer: Hank Medress

Buster Poindexter chronology
Buster Poindexter (1987)	Buster Goes Berserk (1989)	Buster's Happy Hour (1994)

Buster Goes Berserk is the second album by Buster Poindexter, an alter ego of singer David Johansen. It was released in 1989 by RCA Records. The version of "Hit the Road Jack" reached No. 40 on the Billboard Adult Contemporary chart and also appeared on the soundtrack to The Dream Team.

== Production ==
Members of the cast of Sarafina! performed on the album. "Who Threw the Whiskey in the Well" is a cover of the song made famous by Wynonie Harris. "International Playboy" is a cover of the Wilson Pickett song.

== Critical reception ==
Professional ratings
Review scores
Source	Rating
AllMusic	3/5 stars
Robert Christgau	B−
Los Angeles Times	2.5/5 stars

Robert Christgau wrote that "Buster's no better at bigtime schmaltz than David was." The Los Angeles Times determined that "this ice-breaking-if scarcely ground-breaking-disc is still a purr-fect poolside party platter for too-hepcats 'n' snake-hipped kittens as well as fine, fine, superfine grist for the live show's gin mill."

The Washington Post deemed the album "lite beer beach music." The New York Times concluded that "the best cuts are those that suggest scenes from a wild party in progress where the host is the rambunctious, half-pickled singer, who has immersed himself in the persona of a funky soul man."

== Track listing ==
1. "All Night Party" (Ashley "Grub" Cooper) - 3:53
2. "Hit the Road Jack" (Percy Mayfield) - 3:14
3. "International Playboy" (Bernard Broomer, Bunny Sigler, Lee Phillips, Ugene Dozier) - 4:34
4. "Poorest People" (Roy Brown) - 4:31
5. "Juicy Lucy" (Albert Chancy) - 4:04
6. "Who Threw the Whiskey in the Well" (Eddie DeLange, Johnny Brooks) - 3:21
7. "At the Party" (Johnny Rivera) - 3:01
8. "Imitation of Life" (Arno Hecht, Crispin Cioe, David Johansen, Bob Funk, "Hollywood" Paul Litteral) - 4:32
9. "Debourge Yourself" (Arno Hecht, Crispin Cioe, David Johansen, Bob Funk, "Hollywood" Paul Litteral) - 3:41
10. "Deep in a Dream" (Eddie DeLange, Jimmy Van Heusen) - 3:11

== Personnel ==
- Buster Poindexter - vocals

The Banshees of Blue:

- Charlie Giordano - keyboards and accordion, musical director
- Brian Koonin - electric and acoustic guitars, mandolin, conductor
- Tony Machine - drums
- Tony "Antoine Fats" Garnier - upright bass and electric bass
- Fred Walcott - percussion
- Soozie Tyrell - vocals and violin
- Ivy Ray - vocals
- Randi Michaels - vocals

The Uptown Horns:

- Crispin Cioe - alto and baritone saxophone
- Bob Funk - trombone
- Arno Hecht - tenor saxophone
- "Hollywood" Paul Litteral - trumpet

Additional vocals provided by Martha Wash, Jocelyn Brown, Brenda White, Lisa Lowell, Hoy Boy, John Collins, Kevin Trainor, Terry Gabis, Futz, Steve Paul, and from the cast of Sarafina!: Baby Cele, Lindiwe F. Dlamini, Lindiwe C. Hlengwa, Thamsanga Hlatywayo, Leleti Khumalo, Thandini Mavimbela, Nhlanhla Ngema, Pat Mlaba, Thandekile Nhlanhla and Thandi G. Zulu.
