= The David Johansen Group Live =

David Johansen

Live album by David Johansen
- Released: 1978 Promotional LP 1993 CD Release 2003 CD Re-release
- Recorded: July 21, 1978
- Genre: Rock
- Length: 38:16
- Label: Epic
- Producer: David Johansen

Professional ratings
Review scores
Source	Rating
AllMusic	4/5 stars

The David Johansen Group Live was originally a promotional-only LP released by David Johansen to help promote his solo career away from the New York Dolls. The nine tracks from the promotional LP were recorded on July 21, 1978 at the New York's The Bottom Line. In 1993, a CD was released of the full 18 songs from the 1978 concert.

Sylvain Sylvain and Johnny Thunders (Johansen's bandmates from the New York Dolls) appear as guest performers on the album.

== Promotional album track listing ==
Side one

1. "Funky But Chic" (Johansen, Sylvain)
2. "Not That Much" (Johansen, Verno)
3. "Build Me Up Buttercup" (Mike d'Abo, Tony Macaulay)
4. "I'm a Lover" (Buz Verno, Johnny Ráo, Thomas Trask)
5. "Donna" (Johansen)

Side two

1. "Frenchette" (Johansen, Sylvain)
2. "Lonely Tenement" (Johansen)
3. "Girls" (Johansen, Sylvain)
4. "Personality Crisis"(Johansen, Johnny Thunders)

== CD track listing ==
1. "Cool Metro" 4:03
2. "Looking for a Kiss" 3:44
3. "Not That Much" 3:41
4. "Funky But Chic" 4:26
5. "Donna" 4:51
6. "Build Me Up Buttercup" (Mike d'Abo, Tony Macaulay) - 3:42
7. "I'm a Lover" (Buz Verno, Johnny Ráo, Thomas Trask) - 3:58
8. "I Found a Love" (Robert West, Willie Schofield, Wilson Pickett) - 4:19
9. "Reach Out (I'll Be There)" (Holland-Dozier-Holland) - 4:24
10. "The Girls Don't Come" (Chris Andrews) - 1:10
11. "Frenchette" 6:41
12. "Lonely Tenement" 4:31
13. "Girls" 4:29
14. "Personality Crisis" 3:48
15. "It's a Heartache" (Ronnie Scott, Steve Wolfe) - 3:27
16. "Personality Crisis" 2:03
17. "Love Child" (Deke Richards, Frank Wilson, Pam Sawyer, R. Dean Taylor) - 5:08
18. "Babylon" 4:37

== Personnel ==
- David Johansen - vocals, acoustic guitar on "Frenchette"
- Sylvain Sylvain - guitar, piano, backing vocals
- Johnny Ráo - guitar, backing vocals
- Thomas Trask - guitar, backing vocals
- Buz Verno - bass, backing vocals
- Frankie LaRocka - drums, backing vocals

Additional personnel

- Johnny Thunders - guitar & vocals on "Babylon"
- Dave Still, David Johansen, Peter Flynn - mixing
