= Buster's Spanish Rocketship =

Studio album by Buster Poindexter
- Released: 1997
- Recorded: 1995–1997
- Genre: Salsa; merengue
- Length: 52:57
- Label: PolyGram
- Producer: Brian Koonin

Buster Poindexter chronology
Buster's Happy Hour (1994)	Buster's Spanish Rocketship (1997)	David Johansen and the Harry Smiths (2000)

Buster's Spanish Rocketship is an album by Buster Poindexter, the alter ego of singer David Johansen. Following ...Rocketship, Johansen returned to recording albums under his real name.

The album was named after Buster's new backing band.

== Critical reception ==
Professional ratings
Review scores
Source	Rating
AllMusic	2.5/5 stars
Robert Christgau	(3-star Honorable Mention)

The Sun-Sentinel wrote: "Turning his slightly jaded eye toward salsa, merengue and the most broken Spanish ever spoken, Buster brings on the bongos and dancing girls." Tulsa World thought that "his voice is giving out, but his spicy reverie will always flip skirts up."

AllMusic wrote that "the Latin-tinged Buster's Spanish Rocketship is a minor triumph, demonstrating that David Johansen has an ear for material and a self-deprecating sense of humor that keeps Poindexter enjoyable."

== Track listing ==
All tracks composed by David Johansen.

1. "Ondine" – 2:55
2. "Nueva Broadway (They Don't Smoke)" – 4:18
3. "Downtown Dream" – 4:10
4. "Inez (Is Just a Big Rage Queen)" – 4:13
5. "The Closer I Get to Heaven" – 4:15
6. "My First Sin" – 4:28
7. "Let's Take It Easy" – 3:43
8. "Linda Lee" – 3:41
9. "Iris Chacon" – 3:43
10. "Skin & Bones" – 3:36
11. "Mean Spirited Sal" – 4:17
12. "Lay Down" – 3:42
13. "Rhumba (Dance Fever)" – 5:56

== Personnel ==
- Buster Poindexter – vocals

The Banshees of Blue

- Soozie Tyrell – vocals
- Richard Barone – vocals
- Brian Koonin – guitar, cuatro
- Jack Bashkow – saxophone, piccolo
- Kenny Fradley – trumpet
- Byron Stripling – trumpet
- Mark Pender – trumpet
- Conrad Herwig – trombone
- Jimmy Bosch – trombone
- Randy Andos – bass trombone
- Charlie Giordano – accordion, piano
- Andy Gonzales – bass
- Brian Hamm – bass
- Tony Machine – drums
- Fred Walcott – percussion
- Ismael "Bongo" Bruno – percussion
- Mike Jacobson – percussion
