= Sweet Revenge (David Johansen album) =

Studio album by David Johansen
- Released: 1984
- Genres: Rock; synth-pop
- Length: 37:29
- Label: Passport
- Producers: David Johansen; Joe Delia

David Johansen chronology
Live It Up (1982)	Sweet Revenge (1984)	Buster Poindexter (1987)

Sweet Revenge is an album by David Johansen, released in 1984. It is the only Johansen album to be released on Passport Records. It was his first album without any participation by any other former members of the New York Dolls.

Around the time of Sweet Revenge, Johansen adopted his alter-ego, Buster Poindexter. For the next 15 years, Buster Poindexter would remain at the forefront of Johansen's music career.

== Critical reception ==
Professional ratings
Review scores
Source	Rating
AllMusic	3.5/5 stars
The Rolling Stone Album Guide	3/5 stars
The Village Voice	A−

The Philadelphia Inquirer wrote that "the swirling, dreamy music that surrounds him on Sweet Revenge provides a dramatic contrast that complements Johansen's rough growl." The New York Times deemed "The Stinkin' Rich" "a potential classic." The Globe and Mail opined that "the synthesizer funk backdrops sound generic rather than eccentrically inspired." The Washington Post called it Johansen's best solo album, writing that it "married the gutsiness of the Dolls with the Depression-era sensibility of many of Poindexter's favorites."

== Track listing ==
All tracks are written by David Johansen & Joe Delia, except where indicated.

Side one
No.	Title	Writer(s)	Length
1.	"Heard the News"		4:24
2.	"Big Trouble"		3:54
3.	"I Ain't Workin' Anymore"		3:35
4.	"King of Babylon"	Johansen, Delia, Danny Toan	4:10
5.	"Sweet Revenge"		4:50

Side two
No.	Title	Writer(s)	Length
1.	"Too Many Midnights"		4:46
2.	"In My Own Time"		3:27
3.	"The Stinkin' Rich"	Johansen, Delia, Brett Cartwright	4:00
4.	"N.Y. Doll"		4:07
Total length:			37:29

== Personnel ==
- David Johansen – lead vocals
- Patti Scialfa – backing vocals on "Big Trouble"
- David Nelson – guitar, Roland synthesizer, backing vocals
- Neil Jason – bass on "N.Y. Doll"
- Joe Delia – keyboards, sequential programming
- Soozie Kirschner – backing vocals on "Big Trouble"
- Brett Cartwright – bass, backing vocals
- Dennis McDermott – drums, backing vocals
- Steve Thornton – percussion
- Jimmy Rip – guitar
- Artie Kaplan – saxophone on "N.Y. Doll"
- Rocky Savino, Jr. – harmonica on "In My Own Time"
- Peter Gordon – saxophone
- Stephen Bray – drums
- April Lang – backing vocals on "Big Trouble"
- "Big" Jay McNeely – saxophone on "I Ain't Workin' Anymore"
- Claudia Engelhart – "newscaster" on "Heard the News"

Technical

- Davitt Sigerson and Michael Zilkha – production on "King of Babylon" and "The Stinkin' Rich"
- Richard Gottehrer – production on "Sweet Revenge"
- Larry Alexander, Fred Heller, Tom Lord-Alge – engineers
