= David Johansen and the Harry Smiths =

Studio album by David Johansen
- Released: 2000
- Recorded: November 29 – December 2, 1999
- Studios: St. Peter's Episcopal Church, New York, NY
- Genres: Blues; folk blues
- Length: 50:28
- Label: Chesky
- Producers: David Chesky, Brian Koonin

David Johansen chronology
Buster's Spanish Rocketship (1997)	David Johansen and the Harry Smiths (2000)	Shaker (2002)

David Johansen and the Harry Smiths is a 2000 album that David Johansen released with the "Harry Smiths". Johansen created the album following a folk scene that was taking place in the late 1990s in New York City clubs. Inspired by the 1997 reissue of musicologist Harry Everett Smith's Anthology of American Folk Music (a compilation of 1920s and 1930s country and blues recordings), Johansen named his band "the Harry Smiths" and recorded and performed songs from, or inspired by, the Anthology. The Harry Smiths band included long-time Johansen associate Brian Koonin on guitar and mandolin, with Larry Saltzman also playing guitar and playing banjo. The rhythm section of Kermit Driscoll and Joey Baron played for many years with jazz guitarist Bill Frisell, and both have worked extensively with other jazz artists.

The album was his first since 1984 that is credited to him and not his musical alter ego Buster Poindexter.

== Production ==
The album was recorded at St. Peter's Episcopal Church, in New York City, and was produced by Brian Koonin and Norman Chesky.

== Critical reception ==
Professional ratings
Review scores
Source	Rating
AllMusic	4/5 stars
Robert Christgau	(1-star Honorable Mention)
The Encyclopedia of Popular Music	4/5 stars
The Penguin Guide to Blues Recordings	3/4 stars
Rolling Stone	4/5 stars

Exclaim! though that Johansen's "half-spoken, half-sung style marries beautifully to the front-porch demeanour of these rich samples of the music harvested by the late musicologist." The Chicago Reader wrote that "Johansen delivers even the most morbid lyrics with an offhand ease that gives them the immediacy of nightmares." The Guardian wrote that Johansen's "gruff bellow fits this material like a glove, nowhere better than on the bittersweet 'Delia'."

== Track listing ==
No.	Title	Writer(s)	Length
1.	"James Alley Blues"	Rabbit Brown	3:33
2.	"Darling, Do You Remember Me?"	Lightnin Hopkins	4:31
3.	"Delia"	Traditional; arranged by Bob Dylan	6:38
4.	"Little Geneva"	McKinley Morganfield	3:29
5.	"Well, I've Been to Memphis"	Unknown	3:58
6.	"Katie Mae"	Lightnin Hopkins	4:19
7.	"Old Dog Blue"	Unknown	3:24
8.	"Somebody Buy Me a Drink"	Oscar Brown, Jr.	4:10
9.	"Poor Boy Blues"	Unknown	3:18
10.	"On the Wall"	Unknown	2:56
11.	"Don't Start Me Talking"	Sonny Boy Williamson	2:32
12.	"Oh Death"	Unknown	4:01
13.	"Richland Woman"	Mississippi John Hurt	3:39

== Personnel ==
- David Johansen - vocals, guitar, harmonica
- Brian Koonin - guitar, mandolin
- Larry Saltzman - guitar, banjo
- Kermit Driscoll - bass, didjeridu
- Joey Baron - percussion

Additional personnel

- David Chesky - producer
- Brian Koonin - producer
- Norman Chesky - executive producer
- Hank Medress - executive producer
- Barry Wolifson - recording engineer
- Sandy Palmer Grassi - second engineer/production coordinator
- Nicholas Prout - editing and mastering engineer
- Rick Eckerle - recording assistant
- Peter Volpe - recording assistant
- Catherine Kernen - production manager
- Lisa Hershfield - artist development
- Slow Hearth Studio - art direction
