= Buster's Happy Hour =

1994 album by David Johansen

Studio album by Buster Poindexter
- Released: 1994
- Recorded: 1993–1994
- Genre: Swing
- Length: 52:30
- Label: Rhino/Forward
- Producer: Brian Koonin

Buster Poindexter chronology
Buster Goes Berserk (1989)	Buster's Happy Hour (1994)	Buster's Spanish Rocketship (1997)

Professional ratings
Review scores
Source	Rating
AllMusic	4/5 stars
Los Angeles Times	(favorable)
Stereo Review	(unfavorable)
The Village Voice	(choice cut)

Buster's Happy Hour is the third album from Buster Poindexter, the alter ego of singer David Johansen.

Like his previous album Buster Goes Berserk, it features his backing band the Banshees of Blue, and features covers of rhythm and blues songs of the 1940s and 1950s. The cover of the album is a painting by Johansen.

== Track listing ==
No.	Title	Writer(s)	Length
1.	"Breakin' Up the House"		2:36
2.	"Big Fat Mamas Are Back in Style"		2:06
3.	"Doin' What I Please"	Fats Waller, Andy Razaf	2:48
4.	"Let Me In"		2:20
5.	"I Got Loaded"		2:24
6.	"Saturday Night Fish Fry" (duet with Soozie Tyrell)	Louis Jordan, Ellis Walsh	2:51
7.	"Lavender Coffin"		2:17
8.	"Rocket 88"	Ike Turner, credited to Jackie Brenston	2:49
9.	"The Worst Beer I Ever Had"		5:48
10.	"Who Drank My Beer (While I Was in the Rear)?"		2:49
11.	"Rockin' All Nite Long"		2:28
12.	"Knock'm Down Whiskey"		2:33
13.	"Pink Champagne"		2:53
14.	"Drunk" (duet with Bill Morrissey)		2:50
15.	"I'll Die Happy"		3:25
16.	"Butcher Pete (Parts 1 & 2)"	Roy Brown	4:57
17.	"Alcohol"	Ray Davies	4:36
Total length:			52:30

== Personnel ==
- Buster Poindexter - vocals
- Randy Andos - tuba
- Crispin Cioe - flute, alto, baritone and tenor saxophone
- Laurence Etkin - trumpet, flugelhorn, piccolo trumpet
- Bob Funk - trombone
- Tony Garnier - upright bass, vocals
- Charlie Giordano - piano, accordion, vocals
- Arno Hecht - clarinet, baritone and tenor saxophone
- Brian Koonin - banjo, guitar, vocals
- Lisa Lowell - vocals
- Tony Machine - drums, vocals
- Sherryl Marshall - vocals
- Bill Morrissey - vocals
- Catherine Russell - vocals
- Soozie Tyrell - violin, vocals
- Fred Walcott - percussion, vocals
