= Hot Hot Hot =

1983 single by Arrow

Single by Arrow

from the album Hot Hot Hot
- Released: 19 June 1983
- Recorded: 31 December 1982
- Genre: Calypso; soca
- Length: 7:08
- Label: Chrysalis
- Songwriter: Alphonsus Cassell
- Producer: Leston Paul

Arrow singles chronology
"Soca Rhumba" (1981)	"Hot Hot Hot" (1983)	"Long Time" (1984)

"Hot Hot Hot" is a song written and first recorded by Montserratian musician Arrow, featured on his 1982 studio album Hot Hot Hot. The song was a commercially successful dance floor single, with cover versions subsequently released by artists in several countries, including in 1987 by American singer Buster Poindexter.

The song was Arrow's first chart hit, peaking at No. 59 on the UK Singles Chart. A remix of the song, dubbed as the "World Carnival Mix '94" was later released in 1994 and peaked higher than the original, at number 38 on the UK Singles Chart.

The song was used as the theme song of the 1986 FIFA World Cup in Mexico.

== Charts ==
Chart (1984)	Peak position
UK Singles (Official Charts)	59
Chart (1994) ^{1}	Peak position
UK Singles Chart	38
UK Dance Chart	15
ARIA Charts	9

Notes:

- ^{1} - Denotes chart position of 1994 "World Carnival Mix '94" version.

== Certifications ==
Region	Certification	Certified units/sales
Australia (ARIA)	Gold	35,000^{^}
^{^} Shipments figures based on certification alone.

== Buster Poindexter version ==
"Hot Hot Hot"

Single by Buster Poindexter

from the album Buster Poindexter
- Released: 19 June 1987
- Recorded: 22 November 1986
- Length: 4:07
- Label: RCA
- Songwriter: Alphonsus Cassell
- Producer: David Johansen

Buster Poindexter singles chronology
"Hot Hot Hot" (1987)	"Cannibal" (1988)

Music video
- "Hot Hot Hot" on YouTube

The song was covered in 1987 by American singer David Johansen, as his lounge singer persona Buster Poindexter, and released as the first single from his album Buster Poindexter. It garnered extensive airplay through radio, MTV, and other television appearances.

A music video was produced for Johansen's version of the song, in which he appears both as Buster Poindexter and as himself. The video begins with Johansen mentioning his role as the frontman for the 1970s proto-punk band New York Dolls, showing the band's albums and tossing them aside while talking about the "really outrageous clothes" he wore and how he came to be interested in a "refined and dignified kind of a situation", which leads into the song.

In an interview on National Public Radio, Johansen called the tune "the bane of my life", owing to its pervasive popularity as a karaoke and wedding song.

=== Charts ===
Chart (1987–1989)	Peak position
Belgium (Ultratop 50 Flanders)	27
Netherlands (Nederlandse Top 40)	8
Canada (RPM)	47
U.S. Cash Box Top 100	60
U.S. Billboard Hot 100	45
U.S. Billboard Hot Dance Club Play	11

== Other versions ==
- In 1989, Miss Universe contestants sang their version from Parade of Nations and Opening Number from Fiesta Americana Condesa Hotel in Mexico.
- In 1993, English pop duo Pat and Mick released their version as a single which peaked at No. 47 on the UK Singles Chart. It is from their sole album Don't Stop Dancin', also released in 1993.
- In the mid-1990s, British bhangra performer Bina Mistry recorded a version of the song with verses in Hindi. The song was later included in the soundtrack for Bend It Like Beckham.
- In 2013, reggaeton artist Don Omar released a cover titled "Feeling Hot" for his live album Hecho en Puerto Rico. His version peaked at No. 22 on the Billboard Hot Latin Songs chart in the United States. Omar's cover led to Arrow posthumously winning the ASCAP Latin Award in the Urban category.

== Trivia ==
- The song was famous in Brazil as the opening theme of the 1994–95 program of same name Hot Hot Hot, broadcast by free-to-air television network Sistema Brasileiro de Televisão (SBT) and presented by Silvio Santos.
- The song was used as the theme song of the 1986 FIFA World Cup in Mexico.
- The song was modified by the Philippine television variety show Eat Bulaga! as the theme song of its segment "Lottong Bahay".
- The Buster Poindexter version of the song was covered in Go, Diego, Go! Live: The Great Jaguar Rescue.
- The song appears in Futurama at the end of episode Crimes of the Hot.
- The song was used in Family Guy as it was sung by Brian Griffin's cousin Jasper as part of the work out.
- The song was used as the walk-on music for Rob Cross when he won the 2018 PDC World Darts Championship.
- Poindexter’s version was used by Jimmy Buffett before taking the stage to most of his concerts starting in 2008.
- The song was used in the movie Beverly Hills Chihuahua.The song was used in the closing credits of the movie "Bend it like Beckham"2002

== See also ==
- Conga line
- Wedding reception song
