= Jimmie Mack =

American rock singer and songwriter

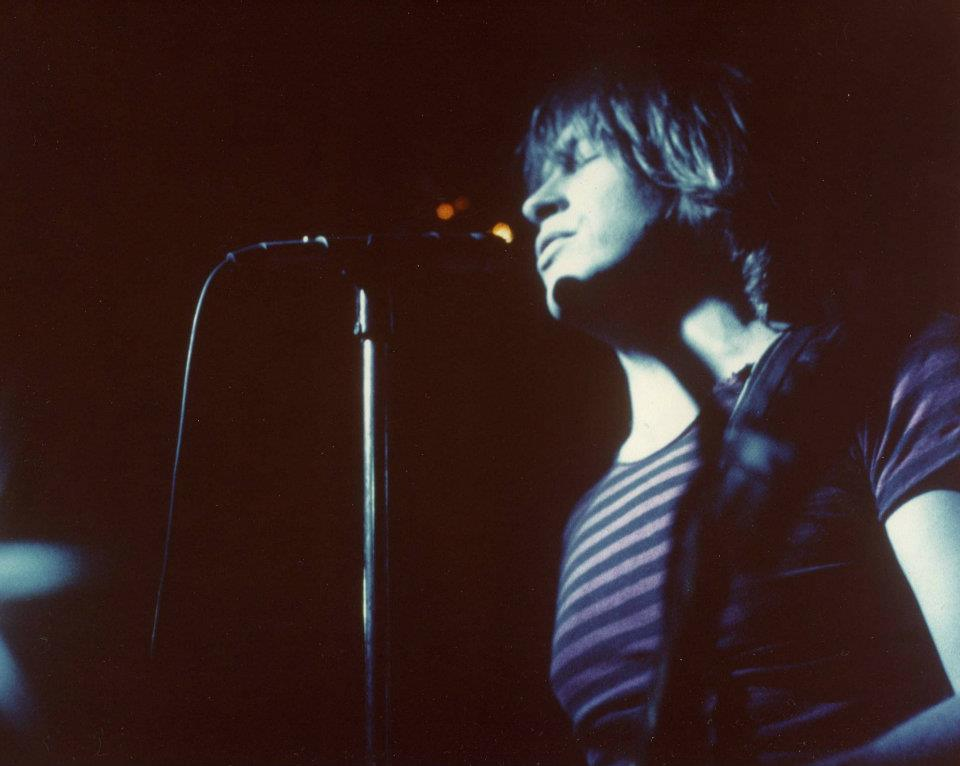
Jimmie Mack playing live at The Studio nightclub in Staten Island, NYC circa 1978.

Jimmie Mack is an American rock singer and songwriter.

Mack was a singer with the Earl Slick Band, and wrote most of Earl Slick's guitar-led material. In 1977, Mack cut a debut solo LP. He also provided backing vocals for rock musician David Johansen on his David Johansen album in 1978.

== Discography ==
- Earl Slick Band (Songwriter, Lead Vocalist, Guitar) 1975
- Earl Slick Band Razor Sharp (Songwriter, Lead Vocalist, Guitar) 1976
- Stunts (Vocalist, film soundtrack) 1977
- Jimmie Mack 1978
- Jimmie Mack On The Corner 1979
- Jimmie Mack & The Jumpers 1980
- Earl Slick Band Live '76 (Songwriter, Lead Vocalist, Guitar) 2001
- Earl Slick Band Sick Trax (Songwriter, Lead Vocalist, Guitar) 2002
