= Arrow (musician) =

Montserratian musician (1949–2010)

Arrow MBE
- Born: Alphonsus Celestine Edmund Cassell; 16 November 1949; Plymouth, Montserrat
- Died: 15 September 2010 (aged 60) Lime Kiln Bay, Montserrat
- Genres: Calypso; soca
- Occupations: Musician; singer-songwriter
- Instrument: Vocals
- Years active: 1959–2010
- Labels: Arrow (1973–2010); Chrysalis (1981–1984); London (1984); Island (1988–1989); Mango (1989–1990)
- Website: Official website

Alphonsus Celestine Edmund Cassell MBE (16 November 1949 – 15 September 2010), known mononymously as Arrow, was a Montserratian calypso and soca musician, regarded as the first superstar of soca from Montserrat. Internationally, his biggest hit song was "Hot Hot Hot" (1982), known from the original by Arrow and numerous later versions by other musicians.

== Early years ==
Born in Plymouth, Montserrat, Cassell first performed at the age of 10 in a concert at the Montserrat Secondary School. He began singing calypso in 1967 and took the Junior Monarch title that year.

Cassell took up singing professionally in 1969. In the same year he was runner up in the Montserrat Calypso King competition. He won the title the next year, following in the footsteps of his brothers Justin (known as Hero) and Lorenzo (known as Young Challenger). Alphonsus won the title four times.

== Career ==
Alphonsus Cassell released his first album Arrow on Target in the summer of 1971, two singles in mid 1972, "Dance with me Woman", and "Jean Under the Bed." In 1972 November he released his second album Arrow Strikes Again His third album was released in 1975. Ed Watson served as the arranger for his first three albums. Arrow recorded five more albums with Watson before he began working with Leston Paul. Arrow began to fuse calypso with other genres including zouk, R&B, and salsa resulting in some criticism and accusations that he was destroying Montserrat's calypso traditions. Others argued that his updating of the genre brought it to a new audience.

In 1982, Arrow began collaborating with arranger Leston Paul and recorded "Hot Hot Hot". It was his biggest hit and it became the biggest selling soca hit of all time. "Hot Hot Hot" was composed by Arrow's brother, Justin 'Hero' Cassell. The song was adopted as the theme song of the 1986 FIFA World Cup in Mexico, and was later covered by Buster Poindexter, Menudo, and Babla & Kanchan. Arrow capitalized on this success with 1983's Heat album, the "Rub Up" single, and 1984's Soca Savage album from which the international hit "Long Time" was taken, a top 30 hit in the United Kingdom. He enjoyed further chart success in the UK with a remixed version of "Hot Hot Hot", which reached number 38 (the original had stalled at number 58). By that time, Arrow was also incorporating Latin brass into his music. Later albums incorporated merengue (1986's Heavy Energy), and rock (1988's Knock Dem Dead). Heavy Energy was his first album for Island Records' Mango label, with two further albums released on the label.

Arrow established himself as a businessman in Montserrat in 1973, owning the Arrow's Manshop store in Plymouth. When the business was destroyed by the Soufriere Hills volcanic eruption, he moved to St. John's, Antigua. He organized a fund-raising calypso festival on the island in 1996, in response to the devastation caused by the volcano. Arrow co-headlined Bermuda's Soca '96 festival and continued to regularly release albums. In 1988, he was given the Living Legends award by the organizers of the Caribbean Song Festival and the Bahamas Tourist Board.

Arrow continued to be much in demand in the Caribbean. He performed at the 2007 Cricket World Cup opening ceremonies at Trelawny Stadium in Jamaica with Shaggy, Byron Lee, and Kevin Lyttle. Arrow's last performance was at a fund-raising concert for Haiti at the Montserrat Cultural Center in January 2010.

== Death ==
Alphonsus Cassell was diagnosed with cerebral cancer in January 2009. He received treatment in Miami and in Antigua. After a bout of pneumonia, he died from complications of cancer on 15 September 2010 at his home in Lime Kiln Bay, Montserrat with his family at his side. He was 60.

== Discography ==
=== Albums ===
- The Mighty Arrow on Target (1972)
- Arrow Strikes Again (1973)
- Keep on Jamming (1975)
- Sweet Beat (1978)
- Instant Knockout (1980)
- Man From Africa (1980)
- Double Trouble (1981)
- Hot Hot Hot (1982)
- Heat (1983)
- Soca Savage (1984)
- Deadly (1985)
- Heavy Energy (1986)
- Soca Explosion (1987)
- Knock Dem Dead (1988)
- Massive (1988)
- O'La Soca (1989)
- Soca Dance Party (1990)
- Hot Soca Hot (1990)
- Zombie Soca (1991)
- Zombie Remixes (1991)
- The Best of Arrow Volume 2 (1992)
- Model De Bam Bam (1992)
- Outrageous (1993)
- Classics (1994)
- Phat (1995)
- Ride De Riddim (1996)
- Turbulence (1998)
- Beat De Drum (2000)
- Arrow – Vintage Volume 1 (2002)
- No Rules (2002)

=== Singles ===
- 1973: "Dance with Me, Woman"
- 1981: "Soca Rhumba" / B-side "Bills"
- 1982: "Curacao" / B-side "Bills"
- 1983: "Rub Up"
- 1983: "Hot Hot Hot" No. 59 UK / B-side "Money"
- 1984: "Long Time" No. 30 UK / B-side "Colombia Rock"
- 1987: "Hurray Hurray" / B-side "Wanna Dance"
- 1988: "Groove Master" No. 23 US Dance
- 1989: "O' La Soca" No. 38 US Dance
- 1994: "Hot Hot Hot (World Carnival Mix '94)" No. 38 UK, No.9 Australia
