= David Johansen =

American singer (1950–2025)

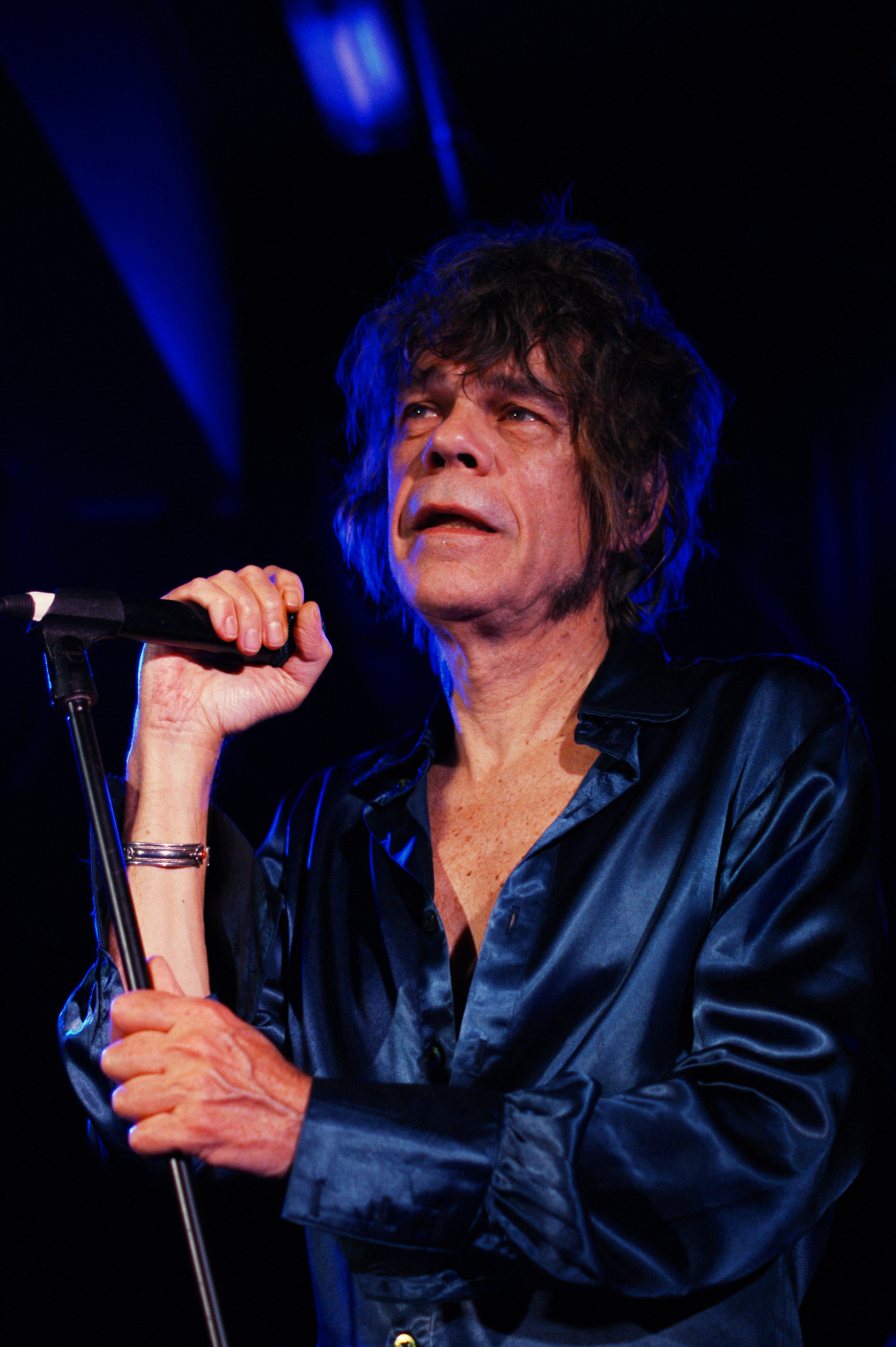
- Johansen in 2011

Background information
- Also known as: Buster Poindexter
- Born: David Roger Johansen; January 9, 1950; Staten Island, New York, U.S.
- Died: February 28, 2025 (aged 75) Staten Island, New York, U.S.
- Genres: Glam punk; hard rock; jump blues; pop; swing; blues
- Occupations: Singer; songwriter; actor
- Instruments: Vocals; guitar; harmonica; percussion
- Years active: 1968–2020
- Formerly of: New York Dolls; The Harry Smiths
- Spouses: Cyrinda Foxe (m. 1977; div. 1978); Kate Simon (m. 1983; div. 2011); Mara Hennessey (m. 2013)

David Roger Johansen (January 9, 1950 – February 28, 2025) was an American singer, songwriter, and actor best known as lead singer of the seminal proto-punk band the New York Dolls. He was also known for his work under the pseudonym Buster Poindexter and for playing the Ghost of Christmas Past in Scrooged (1988).

== Early life ==
Johansen was born in the New York City borough of Staten Island, to a librarian mother, Helen (Cullen), and an insurance sales representative father, Gunvold Johansen, who had previously sung opera. His mother was Irish American and his father was Norwegian American. He was one of five siblings. Johansen attended St. Peter's Boys High School, but was expelled in 1964. He finished his high school education at Port Richmond High School. After graduating, Johansen became involved with the scene at Andy Warhol's Factory. He also worked with Charles Ludlam at Ludlam's Ridiculous Theater Company, where Johansen did sound and lights.

== Career ==
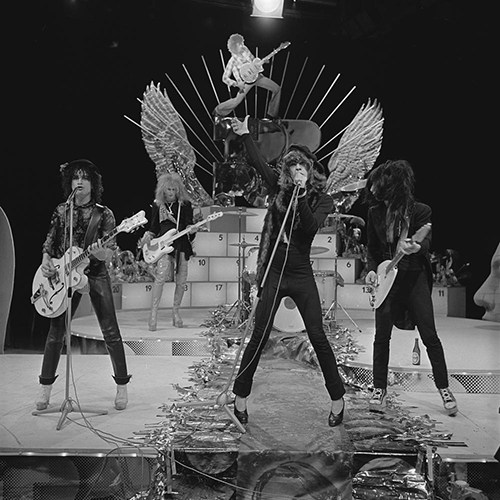
Johansen (center) and the New York Dolls on the Dutch television program TopPop in 1973

Johansen began his career in the late 1960s as the lead singer of the Vagabond Missionaries, a local Staten Island band and later in the early 1970s as the singer/songwriter in the proto-punk band the New York Dolls. The New York Dolls were part of the Mercer Arts Center's scene, appearing on the bill at a New Year's Eve 1972 gig with Ruby and the Rednecks. They released two albums, New York Dolls (1973) and Too Much Too Soon (1974). The bulk of the material was written by Johansen and guitarist Johnny Thunders. The Dolls had a strong cult following and glowing reviews from critics such as Lester Bangs, Robert Christgau and Nick Kent, but overall garnered a divided critical reaction and did not initially find commercial success. The New York Dolls appeared on the BBC TV's live music programme The Old Grey Whistle Test, where presenter "Whispering Bob" Harris notoriously derided the band on air as "mock rock".

In 1975, Johnny Thunders and Jerry Nolan left the band. Johansen and Sylvain Sylvain along with Peter Jordan, Chris Robison, and Tony Machine continued playing as the New York Dolls until 1976 after which Johansen embarked on a solo career. His first two solo albums, the David Johansen and In Style, featured several enduring originals. His self-titled album peaked at number 91 in Australia in August 1978. Sylvain Sylvain frequently performed with him and his band covered many Dolls songs in concert. His live albums Live It Up and The David Johansen Group Live document Johansen's reputation as an exceptional concert performer. The studio releases Here Comes the Night (which includes a signature number, "Heart of Gold") and Sweet Revenge again showcased his strengths as a writer of new material and featured a guest appearance by jazz saxophone player Big Jay McNeely. A number of the songs on Here Comes the Night were co-written with South African musician Blondie Chaplin. In 1982 Johansen was the opening act for the Who at several U.S. East Coast concerts, including Shea Stadium in New York City and Capital Centre near Washington, D.C.

=== Buster Poindexter ===
In the late 1980s, Johansen achieved moderate commercial success under the pseudonym Buster Poindexter, accompanied by the Uptown Horns, performing jump blues, traditional pop, swing, and novelty songs. He also appeared as part of the house band on the television program Saturday Night Live. As Poindexter, he scored his first hit song, "Hot Hot Hot", which, in an interview on National Public Radio's Fresh Air, he called "the bane of my life" due to its pervasive popularity. "Hot Hot Hot" was initially written and recorded by Montserratian Soca artist Arrow. As Poindexter, Johansen often appeared with his band, the Banshees of Blue. Early Poindexter releases combined an eclectic selection of covers with Johansen's own compositions. Johansen went on to issue Buster's Happy Hour, an album of songs thematically linked by their subject matter: alcohol. It was followed by Buster Poindexter's Spanish Rocket Ship, which focused on salsa and merengue music.

=== Acting ===
Johansen acted in several films during the 1980s and 1990s, and in 2000, had a brief role on the HBO drama series Oz. He appeared in the television series The Adventures of Pete & Pete in the episode "On Golden Pete", in which he played a park ranger. He appeared in the Muppet Television segment of an episode of The Jim Henson Hour. He also appeared in The Equalizer playing a violent criminal named Garnet in the 1987 episode "Re-Entry". Among his more prominent roles are that of the wisecracking Ghost of Christmas Past in Scrooged (1988), which starred Bill Murray as well as the part of "Looney" in the movie Let It Ride (1989), playing opposite Richard Dreyfuss. He starred opposite Hulk Hogan and Sherman Hemsley in Mr. Nanny (1993) and co-starred with John C. McGinley in the movie Car 54, Where Are You? (1994), based on the television series. He can be seen in the Jim White documentary film Searching for the Wrong Eyed Jesus in which he sings a version of Geeshie Wiley's "Last Kind Words" while in a motel room. He also had a supporting role with Mick Jagger and Emilio Estevez in the movie Freejack (1992). He played Halston (a hired hitman) in the anthology film Tales from the Darkside: The Movie (1990), in the segment "The Cat from Hell". He was the guest music artist on the Miami Vice episode "The Dutch Oven" (1985), where he sang "King of Babylon". Johansen most recently portrayed the bartender in the Bill Murray Netflix special A Very Murray Christmas. Johansen voiced the villain Ding Dong Daddy in the original Teen Titans animated series in the season 5 episode 9 episode "Revved Up". Johansen's legs appeared in John Lennon and Yoko Ono's 1971 film Up Your Legs Forever. He voiced the Beartaur character in the 2021 Centaurworld animated Netflix television series.

=== Later solo career ===
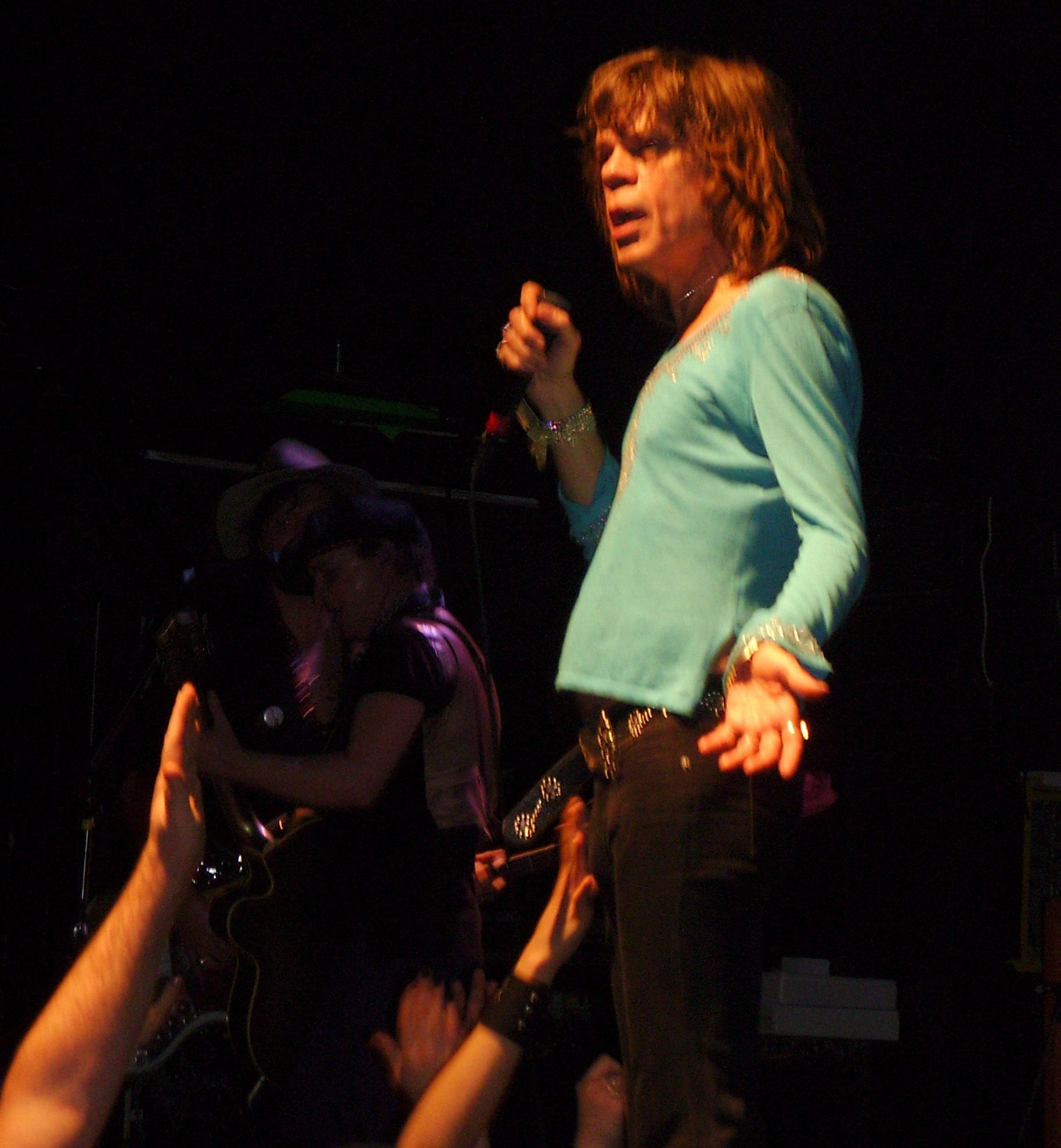
Johansen performing in Toronto, February 18, 2008

Johansen then turned to blues with his group the Harry Smiths. The group was named as a tribute to Harry Everett Smith, who compiled the Anthology of American Folk Music, several songs of which were covered by the band. Johansen's second album with the Harry Smiths is titled Shaker.

In 2004, Johansen reunited with Sylvain Sylvain and Arthur Kane of the New York Dolls. Owing to the success of the tour, in 2006 the New York Dolls released One Day It Will Please Us to Remember Even This, their first album in nearly 30 years. It was critic Robert Christgau's choice for album of the year. In 2009 the band released Cause I Sez So and in 2011 Dancing Backward in High Heels.

Johansen hosted a weekly show, David Johansen's Mansion of Fun, on Sirius Satellite Radio while continuing to write and perform. Featuring music "from the jungles of Africa to the Bayou of Louisiana and from Duke Ellington to Phil Spector to Billy Joe Shaver, the show was all over the musical map", the show is free-form and eclectic. As of January 2020, the show aired on channel 710 (stream-only), The Loft.

In October 2007, Johansen participated in the Staten Island Composers Project, which featured work by three musicians who called the island home: Johansen; Vernon Reid, founder of the 1980s rock-metal pioneers Living Colour; and Galt MacDermot, best known as the composer of the musical Hair. The Council on the Arts and Humanities for Staten Island commissioned the program and asked each artist to write 20 minutes of music conveying something of his connection to the island often referred to as New York City's forgotten borough. Johansen's opus, a cinematic and unabashedly romantic Adagio scored mostly for strings, is called "Mara Dreams the Moon Gate of Uncommon Beauty". Inspired by "The Moon Gate of Uncommon Beauty", a round portal between two rockscapes in the Chinese Scholar's Garden at the Staten Island Botanical Garden. In September 2009, he appeared on Anthony Bourdain: No Reservations, the Travel Channel television program, in which he toured Staten Island with the program's host.

In addition to his own albums, Johansen contributed songs to the soundtracks of the films Times Square and The Aviator ("Flowers in the City" and "Ain't Cha Glad" respectively) and guests on About Them Shoes, a CD by veteran blues man Hubert Sumlin. Another non-album track of his, "Johnsonius", appears on the 1984 compilation A Diamond Hidden in the Mouth of a Corpse and "The Rope (The Let Go Song)", a track originally recorded during the sessions for his eponymous first album and published on the B-side of the single, "Funky But Chic", a song that was performed by the original New York Dolls before their break up.

An artist noted for his musical unpredictability and versatility, Johansen was a consistent blues enthusiast since the earliest days of the Dolls, with covers of songs by Bo Diddley and Sonny Boy Williamson among their earliest numbers. The 2006 Dolls CD Private World : The Complete Early Studio Demos 1972/3 featured the Dolls performing songs by Otis Redding, Gary U.S. Bonds, Chuck Berry, The Shangri-Las, and Muddy Waters, in addition to versions of songs from their two Mercury albums. Also featured on the CD was a previously unreleased Dolls number, "Endless Party".

Johansen worked consistently with Sylvain Sylvain, drummer Tony Machine – formerly an agent who worked for Leber & Krebs, a member of the New York Dolls in 1975–1976 and a fixture in many David Johansen groups and throughout the Buster Poindexter period – and Brian Koonin, guitarist and banjo player with Buster Poindexter and the Harry Smiths as well as keyboard player with the New York Dolls for the first reunion engagement and the One Day It Will Please Us to Remember Even This CD and tour.

In September 2020, Johansen released a cover of "Sinking Ship" by Gypsy.

On July 7, 2020, Showtime Documentary Films announced that filmmaker Martin Scorsese would direct a new feature film on Johansen. The Showtime documentary, Personality Crisis: One Night Only, was released on April 14, 2023. Scorsese was joined in the making of the film by his frequent co-director David Tedeschi, and, with Johansen, Scorsese was interviewed about the film by MSNBC host Joe Scarborough.

== Personal life and death ==
Johansen wed actress and long-time girlfriend Cyrinda Foxe in 1977 but divorced within a year in 1978. Johansen was married to photographer Kate Simon from 1983 to 2011. Johansen wed artist Mara Hennessey in 2013.

Johansen was diagnosed with stage four cancer and a brain tumor in 2020, leading to him retiring from performing as a live musician. He fell and broke his back in two places in November 2024 and required surgery. His step-daughter launched a fundraiser to help with his treatment on February 10, 2025.

David Johansen died from cancer at his Staten Island home on February 28, 2025, at the age of 75.

== Discography ==
=== David Johansen ===
==== Studio albums ====
Title	Details	Peak chart positions	
Title	Details	US	AUS
David Johansen	Released: May 1978; Label: Blue Sky/CBS; Razor & Tie; Format: LP, cassette	—	91
In Style	Released: 1979; Label: Blue Sky; Format: LP, cassette	177	—
Here Comes the Night	Released: 1981; Label: Blue Sky; Format: LP, cassette	180	—
Sweet Revenge	Released: 1984; Label: Passport; Format: LP, CD	—	—

==== Live albums ====
Title	Details	Peak chart positions
Title	Details	US
The David Johansen Group Live	Released: 1978; Label: Epic; Format: LP, cassette	—
Live It Up	Released: June 1982; Label: Blue Sky; Format: LP, cassette	148

==== Singles ====
Title	Year	Peak chart positions	Album
Title	Year	US Main.	Album
"Funky But Chic / The Rope (The Let Go Song)"	1978	—	David Johansen
"Swaheto Woman"	1979	—	In Style
"Melody / Wreckless Crazy"	1979	—	In Style
"Here Comes the Night"	1981	—	Here Comes the Night
"Marquesa de Sade / She Loves Strangers"	1981	—	Here Comes the Night
"Personality Crisis"	1982	—	Live It Up
"Stranded in the Jungle"	1982	—	Live It Up
"We Gotta Get Out of this Place / Don't Bring Me Down / It's My Life"	1982	28	Live It Up
"Heard the News"	1984	—	Sweet Revenge
"King of Babylon"	1985	—	Sweet Revenge

=== Buster Poindexter albums ===
- 1987: Buster Poindexter US: No. 40
- 1989: Buster Goes Berserk
- 1994: Buster's Happy Hour
- 1997: Buster's Spanish Rocketship

=== David Johansen and the Harry Smiths albums ===
- 2000: David Johansen and the Harry Smiths
- 2002: Shaker

=== Video performances ===
- 1979–1990: The Uncle Floyd Show multiple performances as The David Johansen Group or David Johansen and the Banshees of Blue (himself)
- 1989: Disney MGM Studios Opening special (Performer)
- 2015: Netflix A Very Murray Christmas (Himself)

=== Compilation albums ===
- Stay Awake: Various Interpretations of Music from Vintage Disney Films (1988), as "Buster Poindexter and The Banshees of Soul"
- September Songs – The Music of Kurt Weill (1994/1997) – "Alabama Song"
- Stormy Weather: The Music of Harold Arlen (2003) – "Kickin' the Gong Around"
- Jim White Presents Music From Searching for the Wrong-Eyed Jesus (2005) – "The Last Kind Words", with Larry Saltzman (Geeshie Wiley cover)
- AngelHeaded Hipster: The Songs of Marc Bolan & T-Rex (2020) – "Bang a Gong (Get it On)"
