= Buz Verno =

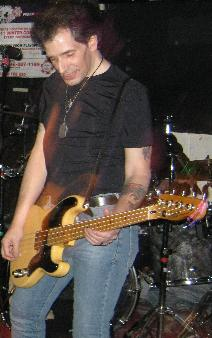
- Buz Verno performing at The Nursery NYC Reunion All Star Jam on May 14, 2011

Background information
- Born: September 28, 1953; Staten Island, New York, U.S.
- Died: August 27, 2020 (aged 66) New York, New York, U.S.
- Genres: Rock, punk rock, blues
- Occupations: Musician, songwriter, vocalist
- Instruments: Bass, guitar, vocals
- Years active: 1970–2020
- Label: Indie
- Website: reverbnation.com/buzverno

Buz Verno (born September 28, 1953, in Staten Island, New York, United States; died August 27, 2020, in New York, New York) was an American bass guitarist, songwriter and singer. After his father encouraged him to start playing music, Verno began to play guitar at seven years old. He switched to bass guitar at 12 years old.

== Career ==
Verno played with The Rats, Beau Jack, Cherry Vanilla, The Staten Island Boys, David Johansen Group, Sylvain Sylvain and the Teenage News, The Others, and Helen Schneider. Verno received his first gold record in 1982 for the album Helen Schneider with The Kick.

During his career, Verno toured with Tom Petty and the Heartbreakers, Earl Slick, David Johansen, Sylvain Sylvain, Greg Allen, Cherry Vanilla, Helen Schneider, Thomas Trask, Johnny Ráo, Tom Morrongiello, Joey Kelly and others.

== Discography ==
Verno credited appearances, excluding compilations:

=== Cherry Vanilla & Her Staten Island Band ===
- 1976 Max's Kansas City (1976)

=== David Johansen ===
- David Johansen (1978)
- In Style (1979)

=== David Johansen Group ===
- The David Johansen Group Live (1978)
- Live (1993)

=== Helen Schneider ===
- Schneider with The Kick (1981)
- Breakout (1983)

=== Pandora ===
- Unreleased 7" promo flexidisc (1974)
- Space Amazon (1997)

=== Sylvain Sylvain ===
- Sylvain Sylvain (1979)
