= Kate Simon (photographer) =

American photographer and writer

- Born: Catherine Simon; June 15, 1953 (age 73); Poughkeepsie, New York, U.S.
- Education: George Washington University
- Known for: Photography
- Spouse: David Johansen (m. 1983; div. 2011)

Catherine Simon (born June 15, 1953) is an American portrait photographer and writer. She is known for her photographs of influential musicians, artists, and writers, including The Clash, Patti Smith, Madonna, Andy Warhol, and William S. Burroughs. One of her photographs of Bob Marley was used on the front cover of his 1978 album, Kaya, and another of the Clash was used for the front cover of their debut album.

Simon's photography has been featured in various books, magazines, and gallery exhibitions. In 2004, she published Rebel Music: Bob Marley and Roots Reggae, a book of her photographs of Bob Marley and the Wailers published by Genesis Publications. Some of Simon's works are held in the permanent collections of the Museum of Modern Art, the Smithsonian Institution's National Portrait Gallery, and the Andy Warhol Museum. She has exhibited her work in three Solo Exhibitions since 2019 with the art gallery Fort Works Art in Fort Worth, Texas , and New York City.

== Early life and education ==
Simon was born and raised in Poughkeepsie, New York. She developed an interest in photography at an early age when her father, a doctor and amateur photographer, gave her a Polaroid camera. Simon attended George Washington University (GWU) in Washington D.C. During her second year, she studied abroad in Paris, France. She later took a photography course at GWU's Corcoran School of the Arts and Design. Shortly thereafter, she left college to pursue a career in photography.

== Career ==
=== Early career ===
In 1972, Simon moved to London and was initially employed at The Photographers' Gallery, staffing the front desk and the library. She then worked as an independent photographer, capturing a shot of the poet W. H. Auden after requesting to take his picture in an Oxford tea shop. Simon was later hired as a staff photographer by Dave Fudger, the art director for the music weekly, Disc. During her early career, she shot various rock artists such as Rod Stewart, Led Zeppelin, and The Rolling Stones. In 1974, she photographed David Bowie while he recorded Diamond Dogs at Olympic Studios in Barnes, west London. The next year, in 1975, she traveled as a tour photographer for Lynyrd Skynyrd, The Who, and Black Sabbath. She photographed a grinning Bob Pridden, the sound engineer for The Who, holding a pistol to the head of Skynyrd's lead vocalist Ronnie Van Zant in a Greek restaurant. The same year, she began photoshoots with writer William S. Burroughs.

Simon continued her career at additional publications such as Sounds and New Musical Express, documenting musicians from the emerging punk rock scene. On April 23, 1976, she photographed the Sex Pistols and their manager Malcolm McLaren during the moments leading up to a concert fight with the audience at the Nashville Rooms in West Kensington, capturing the violence instrumental to the group's initial publicity. The following November, she took photographs of The Clash in an alley outside Bernard Rhodes’ Rehearsal Rehearsals in Camden, north London, one of which was used for the front cover of the group's self-titled debut album.

=== Bob Marley ===
In July 1975, Simon shot a performance by Bob Marley and The Wailers at the Lyceum Theatre in London. The next year, in 1976, she was sent to Jamaica by Chris Blackwell, the owner of Island Records, to photograph reggae artist Bunny Wailer for the promotion of his Blackheart Man album. During the trip, she also photographed Wailer's fellow reggae pioneers including Bob Marley, Peter Tosh, and Lee "Scratch" Perry. Simon captured a photograph of Marley by the pool which appeared as the front cover for his album, Kaya. The photograph was noted by Marie-Monique Robin as one of the historic images of the 20th century. Her photograph was noted in the Lens section of The New York Times by John Leland who wrote:

The photo has since made its way around the globe, perhaps unwittingly contributing to the tourism-board image that has grown around Marley. Yet there is also a vitality to the image – the sharpness of Marley's gaze, the wiry strength under the athletic suit – that is harder to possess or cuddle up to, even for a face that has become a global brand. In the frame he is both smaller and larger than his image.

In 1977, Simon shot the European leg of Marley's Exodus Tour. She continued to photograph Marley for the next four years, documenting his performances and everyday life until his death in 1981.

=== Editorial and television ===
In 1977, Simon moved to New York City and began incorporating more posed portraitures into her portfolio. The same year, she photographed Debbie Harry, the lead singer of Blondie, on the roof of a New York apartment. In 1978, Simon traveled with Queen as the group's tour photographer. She also began appearing on TV Party, a public access cable television show where she worked as the photographer and as one of Glenn O'Brien's featured co-hosts.

In 1978, Simon photographed Patti Smith and Robert Mapplethorpe outside a New York building. The following year, in 1979, she shot Michael Jackson on the set of his "Rock with You" music video. The same year, she photographed Andy Warhol reading a newspaper while she was working for his publication, Interview magazine. She also worked for Creem magazine and was later credited for her "humanizing touch" in her photographs of the era's pop culture icons. In 1981, Simon was hired as the photographer for The Face magazine. In 1983, she was assigned Madonna's first official professional photoshoot which took place on the roof of Simon's Manhattan apartment.

=== Select exhibitions and books ===
In 1995, she photographed William S. Burroughs, a last sitting culminating a twenty-year working relationship. One of the shots from the photoshoot of Burroughs' 70th birthday at the "Bunker" was used as the cover for his first posthumous selection of works, titled Word Virus. She later contributed to Patti Smith's photo book, Patti Smith Complete, released in 1998.

In 1999, Simon's earlier photograph of Bob Marley on the Kaya album cover was included in the book, Les 100 photos du siècle, by French journalist Marie-Monique Robin. Simon was interviewed by Robin who was researching photographs previously noted by the French television series, The 100 Photos of the Century, as defining images of the 20th century. In 2008, she worked as a contributing editor for Interview magazine.

== Personal life ==
Simon lives in Manhattan, New York. She was previously married to David Johansen, a founding band member of the New York Dolls.

== Exhibitions ==
=== Solo ===
- Gallery Casa Sin Nombre, Santa Fe, New Mexico, 1989
- Govinda Gallery, Washington D.C., "Rebel Music: Bob Marley & Roots Reggae”, 2004
- Murphy and Dine Wainscott, Long Island, New York, "Life is a Killer", 2008
- Subliminal Projects, Los Angeles, California, "A Furious Heartbeat", 2009
- SHOWStudio, London, UK, "William S. Burroughs Portraits 1975–1995", 2014
- SCOPE NYC, Fort Works Art Gallery, New York City, “Teri Toye”, 2019.
- Fort Works Art Gallery, Fort Worth, Texas, "Chaos and Cosmos", 2019. 136 of Simon's photographs from 1973 to 2011.
- Fort Works Art Gallery, Fort Worth, Texas, “The View From the Inside”, , 2022-23. Cibachromes from the artists private collection.

=== Group ===
- Portland Museum of Art, Portland, Maine, "Backstage Pass", 2009 included Simon's 2007 photograph of Iggy Pop
- Grey Art Gallery, New York University, New York City, "Downtown Pix", 2010
- Who Shot Rock & Roll: A Photographic History, 1955 to the Present, Brooklyn Museum, Brooklyn, New York, 2010. Curated by Gail Buckland. Included a portrait of Bunny Wailer taken by Simon in Kingston, Jamaica, in 1976.
- Irvine Contemporary, Washington D.C., "Image/Fame/Memory", 2011
- SHOWStudio, London, UK, “The Photography of Punk”, 2013
- The Metropolitan Museum of Art, New York City, "Punk: Chaos to Couture”, 2013
- The National Portrait Gallery/Smithsonian Institution, Washington D.C., "American Cool", 2014
- Williams S. Burroughs Portraits 1975–1995, SHOWstudio, London, 2014.
- Glenn Horowitz Gallery, New York City, "The Downtown Decade", 2015
- American Cool, Smithsonian Institution's National Portrait Gallery, 2014
- The Shelburne Museum, Shelburne, Vermont, "Backstage Pass: Rock and Roll Photography”, 2017
- Red Bull Studios and Hunter College Art Gallery, New York City, "I ♥︎ John Giorno", 2017
- Museum of Sex, New York City, "Punk Lust: Raw Provocation 1971–1985”, 2019
- Massachusetts Museum of Contemporary Art, "The Bright and Hollow Sky", 2020
- Vito Schnabel Gallery, "Brigid Berlin: The Heaviest", 2023

== Permanent collections ==
- Museum of Modern Art, New York City
- Smithsonian Institution's National Portrait Gallery, Washington, D.C.
- The Andy Warhol Museum, Pittsburgh, Pennsylvania
- New York University's Fales Library: Richard Hell Papers, New York City
- Yale University Art Gallery, New Haven, Connecticut
- Bob Marley Museum, Kingston, Jamaica

== Published works ==
- Simon, Kate, Rebel Music: Bob Marley & Roots Reggae. Genesis, 2004. ISBN 9780904351910. 400 photographs of Bob Marley and other reggae artists. Edition of 2000 copies.

== Works which include her photographs ==
- Alessandrini, Marjorie, Le Rock Au Féminin, Editions Albin Michel, 1980, ISBN 9782226009593
- Burroughs, William S., Word Virus: The William S. Burroughs Reader, Grove press, Inc., 1998, ISBN 978-0802116291
- Burroughs, William S., Queer, Viking Penguin Inc., 1985, ISBN 9780140083897
- Edited by Charlesworth, Chris, Sex & Drugs & Rock & Roll, Bobcat Books, 1985, ISBN 9780711934450
- Skerl, Jennie, William S. Burroughs, Twayne Publishers, 1985, ISBN 9780805774382
- Hager, Steven, Art After Midnight: The East Village Scene, St. Martin's Press, 1986, ISBN 9780312049768
- Musto, Michael, Downtown, Vintage Books, A Division of Random House, New York, 1986, ISBN 9780394742854
- Acker, Kathy, Literal Madness: Kathy Goes to Haiti; My Death My Life by Pier Paolo Pasolini; Florida, Grove Press, Inc., 1988, ISBN 9780802100016
- Odier, Daniel, The Job: Interviews with William S. Burroughs, Penguin Books, 1989, ISBN 9780140118827
- Chamberlain, Elwyn, Then Spoke the Thunder, Grove Press, 1989, ISBN 9780517079577
- Simon, Kate, Zoom Magazine, Volume 158, 1990
- Savage, Jon, England's Dreaming: The Sex Pistols and Punk Rock, Faber and Faber Limited, 1991, ISBN 9780571167913
- Edited by Scholder, Amy and Silverberg, Ira, High Risk: An Anthology of Forbidden Writings, Dutton, a division of the Penguin Group, 1991, ISBN 9780452265820
- Miles, Barry, Wiliam Burroughs: El Hombre Invisible, Virgin Books, 1992, ISBN 9780753507070
- Burroughs, William S., Ghost of Chance, High Risk Books, 1995, ISBN 9783854452331
- McNeil, Legs and McCain, Gillian, Please Kill Me: The Uncensored Oral History of Punk, Grove Press, 1996, ISBN 9780802125361
- Caveney, Graham, The ‘Priest’, They Called Him: The Life and Legacy of William S. Burroughs, Bloomsbury, 1997, ISBN 9780747533290
- Smith, Patti, Complete, Doubleday, 1998, ISBN 9780385490795
- Robin, Marie-Monique, The Photos of the Century: 100 Historic Moments, Editions du Chêne – Hachette Livre (Original French edition), Evergreen, an imprint of Benedikt Taschen Verlag GmbH (Translated edition), 1999, ISBN 9783822865125
- Edited by George-Warren, Holly, The Rolling Stone Book of the Beats: The Generation and American Culture, Rolling Stone Press, 1999, ISBN 9780786864263
- DeRogatis, Jim, Let It Blurt: The Life and Times of Lester Bangs, Broadway Books, 2000, ISBN 9780767905091
- Acker, Kathy, Rip-Off Red, Girl Detective and The Burning Bombing of America, Grove Press, 2002, ISBN 9781417723010
- Murray, C., Rolling Stones: 40x20, Billboard Books, 2002, ISBN 9781886069930
- Edited by D’Ambrosio, Antonino, Let Fury Have the Hour: The Punk Rock Politics of Joe Strummer, Nation Books, 2004, ISBN 9781560256250
- Kristal, Hilly and Byrne, David, Edited by Brazis, Tamar, CBGB & OMFUG: Thirty Years from the Home of Underground Rock, Harry N. Abrams, Inc., 2005, ISBN 9780810957862
- Gagosian Gallery, Cast A Cold Eye: The Late Work of Andy Warhol Exhibition Catalog, Gagosian Gallery, 2006
- Salewicz, Chris Redemption Song: The Definitive Biography of Joe Strummer, HarperCollins Publishers, 2006, ISBN 9780007172122
- Farley, Christopher John, Before the Legend: The Rise of Bob Marley, Amistad, an imprint of HarperCollins Publishers, 2006, ISBN 9780060539924
- Acker, Kathy, Edited by Scholder, Amy, Harryman, Carla, and Ronell, Avital, Lust for Life: on the Writings of Kathy Acker, Verso, 2006, ISBN 9781844670666
- Goldman, Vivien, The Book of Exodus: The Making & Meaning of Bob Marley & the Wailers’ Album of the Century, Aurum Press Limited, 2006, ISBN 9781845132101
- Purple Fashion Magazine, Volume III, Issue 8, 2007
- Strummer, Joe, The Clash, Atlantic Books, an imprint of Grove Atlantic Ltd., 2008, ISBN 9781843547884
- Denenberg, Thomas, Backstage Pass: Rock and Roll Photography, Yale University Press, 2008, ISBN 9780300151633
- Indiana, Gary, Andy Warhol and the Can that Sold the World, Basic Books, a member of the Perseus Books Group, 2010, ISBN 9781458779908
- Curley, Mallory, A Cookie Mueller Encyclopedia, Randy Press, 2010
- Kasher, Steven, Max's Kansas City: Art, Glamour, Rock and Roll, Harry N. Abrams, 2010, ISBN 9780810995970
- Buckland, Gail, Who Shot Rock & Roll: A Photographic History, 1955 – Present, Abrams Image, 2010, ISBN 9780810995970
- Deitch, Jeffrey, Fairey, Shepard, and D’Ambrosio, Antonino, Mayday: The Art of Shepard Fairey, Gingko Press in association with Obey Giant, 2011, ISBN 9781584234289
- Varvatos, John, John Varvatos: Rock in Fashion, Harper Design, an imprint of HarperCollins Publishers, 2013, ISBN 9780062009791
- Goode, Eric and Goode, Jennifer, AREA: 1983 – 1987, Harry N. Abrams, 2013, ISBN 9780810972766
- Griffin, Chloe, Edgewise: A Picture of Cookie Mueller, Bbooks Verlag, 2014, ISBN 9783942214209
- Page, Jimmy, Jimmy Page, Genesis Publication and Jimmy Page, 2014, ISBN 9781905662326
- Hell, Richard, I Dreamed I Was a Very Clean Tramp, Ecco, an imprint of HarperCollins Publishers, 2014, ISBN 9780062190840
- Fairey, Shepard, Covert to Overt: The Under/Overground Art of Shepard Fairey, Rizzoli International Publications, Inc., 2015, ISBN 9780847846214
- Sevier, Rob and Shipley, Ken, Ork Records: New York City, N. 060, The Numero Group, 2015
- Purple Fashion Magazine, Volume III, Issue 24, 2015
- Catalogue de l’exposition Jamaica Jamaica! présentée à la Philharmonie de Paris, La Découverte, 2017
- Boch, Richard, The Mudd Club, Feral House, 2017, ISBN 9781627310512
- Ingham, John, Spirit of 76: London Punk Eyewitness, Anthology Editions, LLC, 2017, ISBN 9781938265075
- Burroughs, William S., William S. Burroughs’ "The Revised Boy Scout Manual": An Electronic Revolution, Ohio State University Press, 2018, ISBN 9780814254899
- Led Zeppelin, Led Zeppelin, Reel Art Press, 2018, ISBN 9781909526501
- Hannah, Duncan, 20th Century Boy: Notebooks of the Seventies, Alfred A. Knopf, 2018, ISBN 9781524711221
- Smith, Patti, Just Kids Illustrated Edition, HarperCollins, 2018, ISBN 9780062873743
- Dobney, Jayson Kerr and Inciardi, Craig J., Play It Loud: Instruments of Rock & Roll Exhibition Catalog, The Metropolitan Museum of Art, 2019, ISBN 9781588396990
